= Uzbekistan =

Country in Central Asia

Republic of Uzbekistan O‘zbekiston Respublikasi, Ўзбекистон Республикаси
- Flag Emblem
- Anthem: O‘zbekiston Respublikasining Davlat madhiyasi, Ўзбекистон Республикасининг Давлат мадҳияси "State Anthem of the Republic of Uzbekistan"
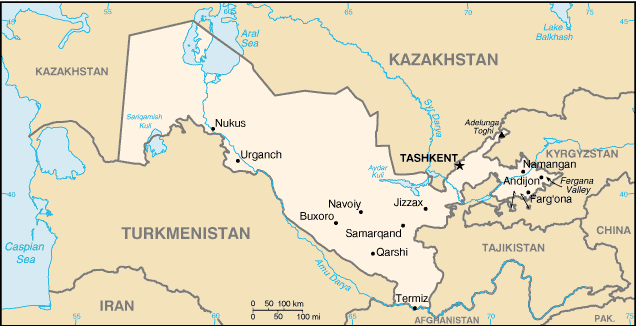
- Capital and largest city: Tashkent; 41°19′N 69°16′E
- Official languages: Uzbek
- Recognised regional languages: Karakalpak
- Ethnic groups (2026): 89.4% Uzbeks; 3.3% Tajiks; 2.2% Karakalpaks; 1.8% Kazakhs; 1.6% Russians; 1.8% others
- Religion (2025): 94.28% Islam; 93.89% Sunni; 0.4% Shi'a; 4.26% Irreligion; 1.17% Christianity; 0.28% other religions; 0.11% Buddhism; 0.01% Judaism; <0.01% Baháʼí Faith; <0.01% Zorastrianism
- Demonym: Uzbek • Uzbekistani
- Government: Unitary semi-presidential republic
  - President: Shavkat Mirziyoyev
  - Prime Minister: Abdulla Aripov
- Legislature: Oliy Majlis
  - Upper house: Senate
  - Lower house: Legislative Chamber

History
  - Uzbek khanates: 1500–1920
  - Bukharan People's Soviet Republic: 8 October 1920
  - Uzbek SSR: 27 October 1924
  - State sovereignty declared: 20 June 1990
  - Independence from the Soviet Union: 1 September 1991
  - Recognised: 2 March 1992
  - Current constitution: 8 December 1992

Area
  - Total: 448,978 km^{2} (173,351 sq mi) (55th)
  - Water (%): 4.9

Population
  - 2026 census: 39,047,321
  - Density: 87/km^{2} (225.3/sq mi) (138th)
- GDP (PPP): 2026 estimate
  - Total: ▲$561.582 billion (53rd)
  - Per capita: ▲$14,421 (113th)
- GDP (nominal): 2026 estimate
  - Total: ▲$178.167 billion (58th)
  - Per capita: ▲$4,575 (127th)
- Gini (2025): ▲32.7 medium inequality
- HDI (2023): ▲0.740 high (107th)
- Currency: Uzbek sum (UZS)
- Time zone: UTC+5 (UZT)
- Calling code: +998
- ISO 3166 code: UZ
- Internet TLD: .uz

Uzbekistan, (Note: Uzbek: Oʻzbekiston, Ўзбекистон, pronounced [ozbekiˈstɒn]; UK: /ʊzˌbɛkɪˈstɑːn, ʌz-, -ˈstæn/, US: /ʊzˈbɛkɪstæn, -stɑːn/) officially the Republic of Uzbekistan, (Note: Oʻzbekiston Respublikasi, Ўзбекистон Республикаси) is a sovereign, doubly landlocked country located in Central Asia. It is bordered by Kazakhstan to the north, Kyrgyzstan to the northeast, Tajikistan to the southeast, Afghanistan to the south, and Turkmenistan to the south-west. It is one of only two doubly landlocked countries in the world, the other being Liechtenstein. The country has a population of more than 39 million, making it the most populous country in Central Asia. (Note: Afghanistan, a country sometimes included in Central Asia's definition, has a population of comparable, albeit uncertain size.) Uzbekistan is a member of the Organisation of Turkic States. Uzbek (written in both Cyrillic and Latin scripts), spoken by the Uzbek people who form more than 89% of the population, is the official language of the country. Russian and Tajik are significant minority languages, with Russian serving as a lingua franca. Tajik is primarily spoken by Tajiks living in the southern parts of the country, such as Samarkand and Bukhara.

The first recorded settlers in Uzbekistan were Eastern Iranian nomads, known as Scythians, who founded kingdoms in Khwarazm, Sogdiana, and Bactria in the 8th–6th centuries BC, as well as in Fergana and Margiana in the 3rd century BC – 6th century AD. The area was incorporated into the Achaemenid Empire and, after a period of Greco-Bactrian rule, was part of the Sasanian Empire until the Muslim conquest of Persia in the seventh century. The early Muslim conquests and the subsequent Samanid Empire resulted in the spread of Islam among the local people. During this period, cities began to grow rich from the Silk Road, and became a centre of the Islamic Golden Age. The local Khwarazmian Empire was destroyed in the Mongol invasion in the 13th century, leading to a dominance by Mongol peoples. Timur in the 14th century established the Timurid Empire. The Timurid capital of Samarkand became a centre of science under the rule of Ulugh Beg, giving birth to the Timurid Renaissance. The territories of the Timurid dynasty were conquered by Turko-Mongol Shaybanids in the 16th century. Most of Central Asia was gradually incorporated into the Russian Empire during the 19th century, with Tashkent becoming the political centre of Russian Turkestan. In 1924, national delimitation created the Uzbek Soviet Socialist Republic as a republic of the Soviet Union. During the Soviet era, Uzbekistan became a leading producer of farm products such as cotton and melons, while also making significant advances in science and technology. It declared independence as the Republic of Uzbekistan in 1991 following the Soviet collapse.

Uzbekistan is a secular state, with a semi-presidential government. Uzbekistan comprises 12 regions (vilayats), Tashkent City, and the autonomous republic of Karakalpakstan. While NGOs have defined Uzbekistan as "an authoritarian state with limited civil rights", significant reforms under Uzbekistan's second President, Shavkat Mirziyoyev, have been made following the death of the first president, Islam Karimov. Owing to these reforms, relations with neighbours Kyrgyzstan, Tajikistan and Afghanistan have drastically improved. The country also holds strong ties with other major regional and global powers like China, Turkey, Russia, India, South Korea, Japan, and the UAE. In recent years, Uzbekistan's ties with the UK, the European Union and the United States have grown rapidly as well.

The Uzbek economy is undergoing a gradual transition to a market economy, with foreign trade policy being based on import substitution. In September 2017, the country's currency became fully convertible at market rates. Uzbekistan is a major producer and exporter of cotton. With gigantic power-generation facilities from the Soviet era and an ample supply of natural gas, Uzbekistan has become the largest electricity producer in Central Asia. Uzbekistan is a member of the Commonwealth of Independent States (CIS), United Nations (UN) and the Shanghai Cooperation Organisation (SCO).

== Etymology ==
The name Uzbegistán appears in the 16th century Tarikh-i Rashidi.

The origin of the word Uzbek remains disputed.

1. "free", "independent" or "own master/leader", requiring an amalgamation of uz (Turkic: "own"), beg ("master" or "leader")
2. eponymously named after Oghuz Khagan, also known as Oghuz Beg
3. A contraction of uğuz, earlier oğuz, that is, the oghuz, or "tribe", amalgamated with bek "oguz-leader".
4. Some scholars connect the name Uzbek to Özbeg Khan, the ruler of the Golden Horde, whence the Uzbeks migrated into what is now Uzbekistan in the 16th century.

All four have the middle syllable/phoneme being cognate with the Turkic title beg.

The name of the country was often spelled Ўзбекистон in Uzbek Cyrillic or Узбекистан in Russian during Soviet rule.

== History ==
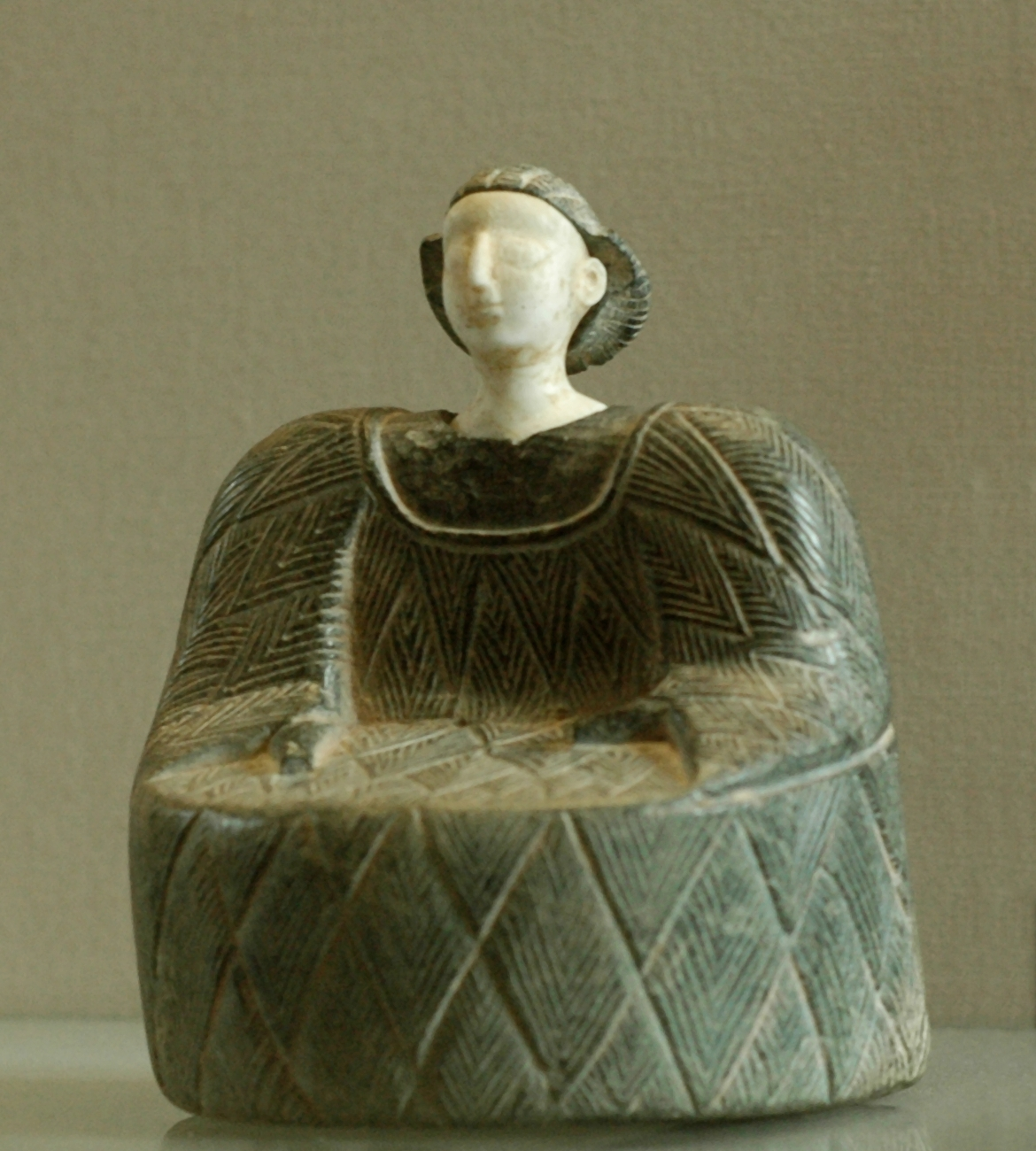
Female statuette wearing the kaunakes. Chlorite and limestone, Bactria, beginning of the second millennium BC.

The region has been referred to by many names over the millennia. The name Uzbekistan first appears in 16th century literature. Other names for the region include Transoxiana, Turkestan, and Bukhara. In the 14th century the region served as the birthplace, home, and capital of Tamerlane. Under Tamerlane, the region was a part of the Timurid Empire which extended from the Black Sea to the Arabian Sea, and as far as Delhi in India.

=== Prehistory and ancient history ===
Central Asia was shaped by multiple Indo-European migrations. During early antiquity, the region was inhabited by nomadic Scythian tribes who came from the Eurasian Steppe, which includes modern Uzbekistan, sometime during the first millennium BC. These nomadic tribes built an extensive irrigation system along the rivers when they settled in the region. At this time, cities such as Bukhoro (Bukhara) and Samarqand (Samarkand) emerged as centres of government and high culture. By the fifth century BC, the Bactrian, Sogdian, and Tokharian states dominated the region.

As East Asia began to develop its silk trade with the West, using an extensive network of cities and rural settlements in the province of Transoxiana, and further east in what is today Xinjiang, the Sogdian intermediaries became the wealthiest of these merchants. As a result of this trade on what became known as the Silk Road, Bukhara and Samarkand eventually became extremely wealthy cities, and at times Transoxiana (Mawarannahr) was one of the most influential and powerful provinces of antiquity.

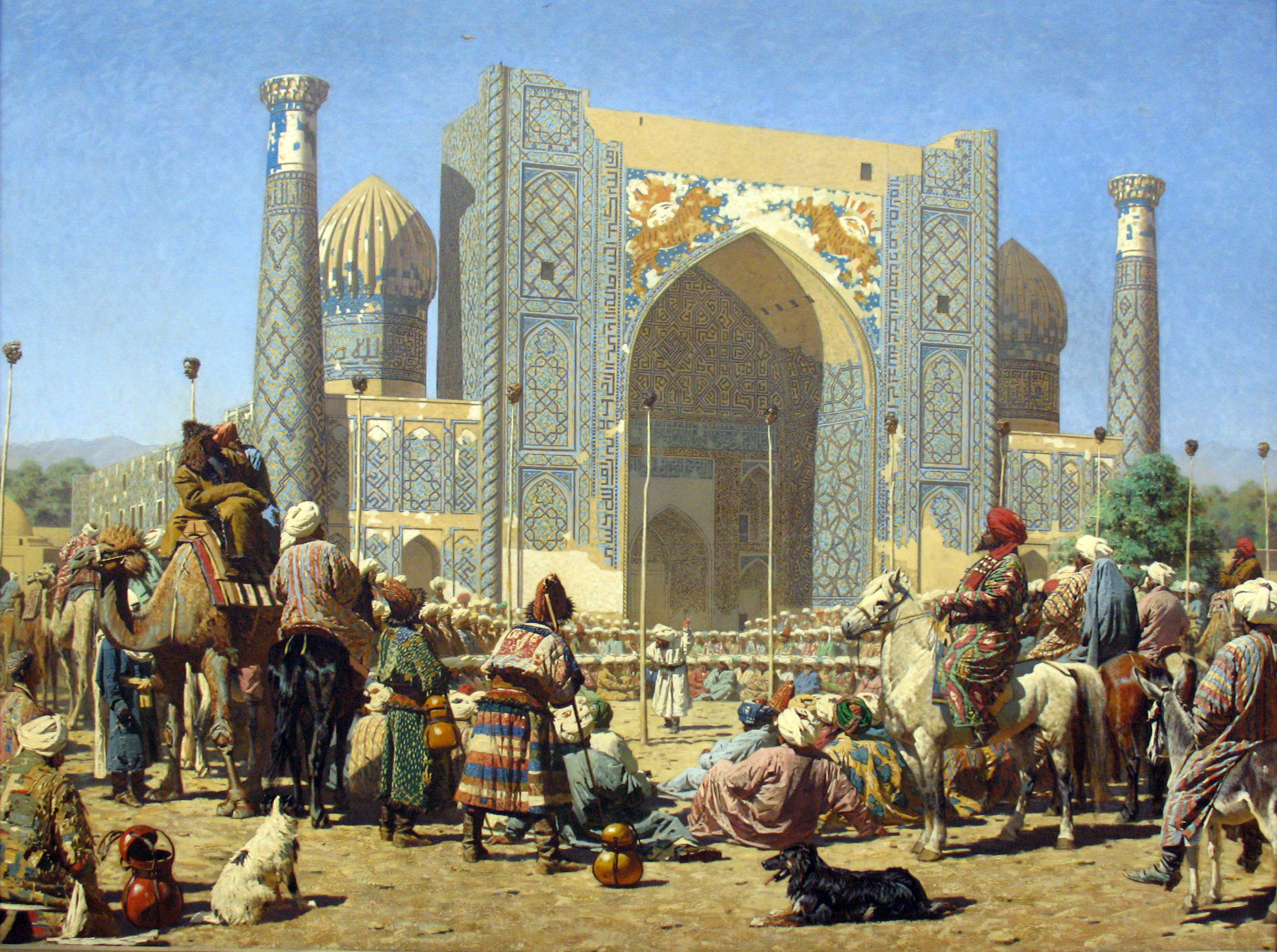
Triumphant crowd at Registan, Sher-Dor Madrasah. The Emir of Bukhara viewing the severed heads of Russian soldiers on poles. Painting by Vasily Vereshchagin (1872).

The Achaemenid emperors Cyrus the Great, and later Darius the Great, exerted control over the Amu Darya, incorporating Bactria and Chorasmia as satrapies. Historical Iranian texts later record the region as Turan. In 327 BC, Macedonian ruler Alexander the Great conquered the Persian Empire provinces of Sogdiana and Bactria, which contained the territories of modern Uzbekistan. Popular resistance to the conquest was fierce, causing Alexander's army to be bogged down in the region that became the northern part of the Macedonian Greco-Bactrian Kingdom. The kingdom was replaced with the Yuezhi dominated Kushan Empire in the first century BC. For many centuries thereafter the region of Uzbekistan was ruled by the Hephthalites and Sassanid empires, as well as by other empires, such as the First Turkic Khaganate established by the Turkic Gokturk peoples.

=== Medieval history ===
In the eighth century, Transoxiana, the territory between the Amu Darya and Syr Darya rivers, was conquered by the Arabs under Qutayba ibn Muslim, soon becoming a focal point during the Islamic Golden Age.

In the ninth and tenth centuries, Transoxiana became part of the Samanid Empire. In the tenth century it was gradually dominated by the Turkic-ruled Karakhanids, as well as their Seljuk successors, another Turkic dynasty.

Karakhanids and Seljuks were succeeded by the Turkic Anushtegin dynasty; the Mongol conquest of Khwarezmian Empire under Genghis Khan during the 13th century brought devastating effects over the region. The invasions of Bukhara, Samarkand, Urgench and other cities resulted in massacres and unprecedented destruction, which saw parts of Khwarezmia being completely razed.

Following the death of Genghis Khan in 1227, the Mongol Empire was divided among his four sons and family members. Despite the potential for serious fragmentation, an orderly succession continued for several generations. Control of most of Transoxiana stayed in the hands of the direct descendants of Chagatai Khan, the second son of Genghis Khan. Orderly succession, prosperity, and internal peace prevailed in the Chagatai Khanate, and the eastern section of the Mongol Empire remained a strong and united kingdom, known as the Golden Horde.

=== Timurid period ===
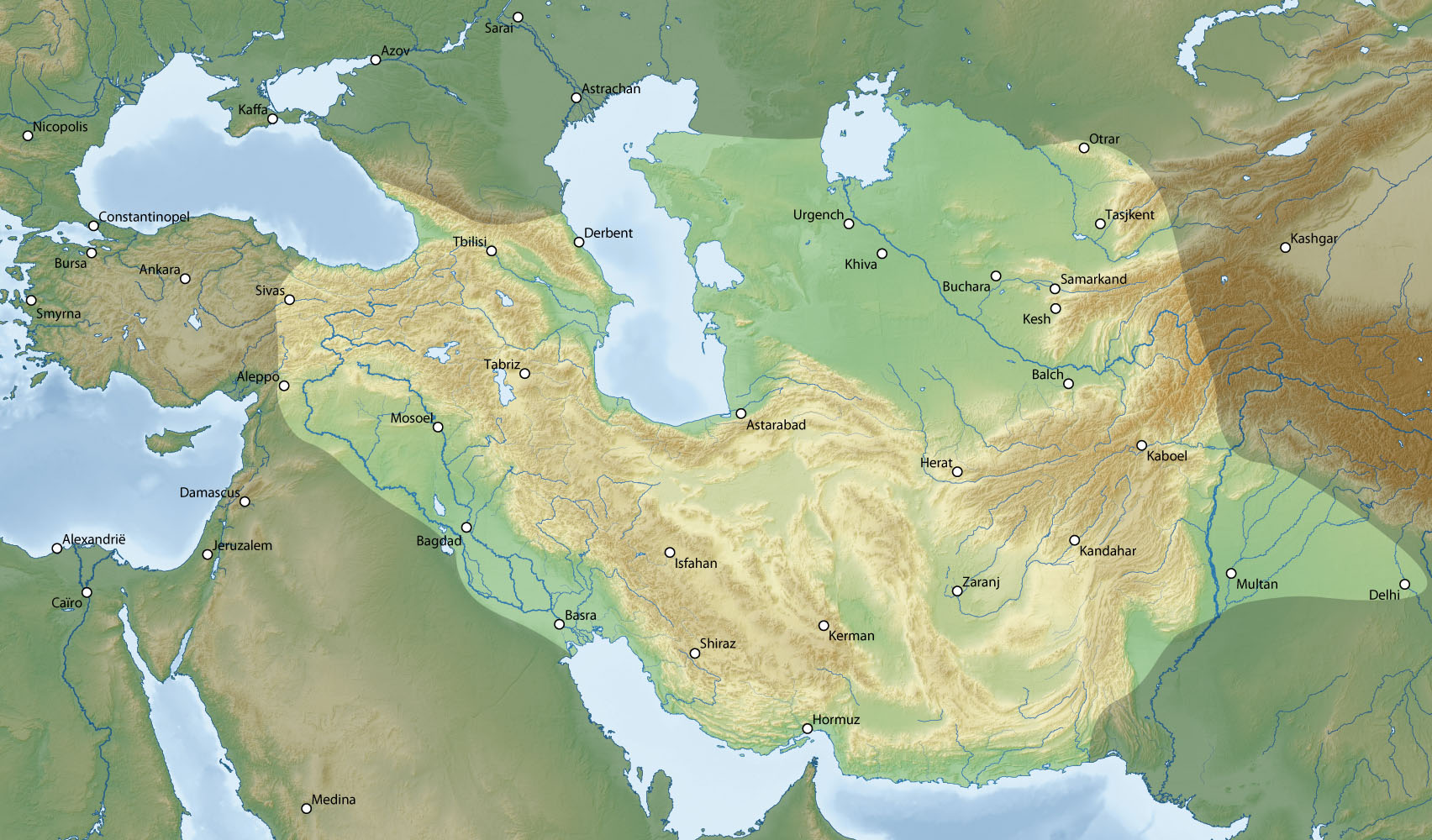
Timur's empire at his death (map without vassals )

One tribal chieftain, Timur (Tamerlane), emerged from struggles in the 1380s as the dominant force in Transoxiana. Although he was not a descendant of Genghis Khan, Timur became the de facto ruler of Transoxiana and proceeded to conquer all of western Central Asia, Iran, the Caucasus, Mesopotamia, Asia Minor, and the southern steppe region north of the Aral Sea. He also invaded Russia before dying during an invasion of China in 1405. Timur was also known for his extreme brutality, and his conquests were accompanied by genocidal massacres in the cities he occupied.

Timur initiated the last flowering of Transoxiana by gathering numerous artisans and scholars from the vast lands he had conquered into his capital, Samarkand, thus imbuing his empire with a rich Perso-Islamic culture. During his reign and the reigns of his immediate descendants, a wide range of religious and palatial construction masterpieces were undertaken in Samarkand and other population centres.

Timur also established an exchange of medical discoveries and became the patron of physicians, scientists, and artists from neighbouring countries such as India; his grandson Ulugh Beg was one of the world's first great astronomers. It was during the Timurid dynasty that Turkic, in the form of the Chaghatai dialect, became a literary language in its own right in Transoxiana, although the Timurids were Persianate in culture. The greatest Chaghataid writer, Ali-Shir Nava'i, was active in the city of Herat (now in north-western Afghanistan) in the second half of the 15th century.

Areas of three Uzbek Polities ruled in Central Asia in the middle of the 19th century: Khanate of Kokand (Ming dynasty) / Khanate of Khiva (Qhongirat dynasty) / Emirate of Bukhara (Manghit dynasty)

=== Uzbek period ===
The Timurid state quickly split in half after the death of Timur. The chronic internal fighting of the Timurids attracted the attention of the Uzbek nomadic tribes living to the north of the Aral Sea. In 1501, the Uzbek forces began a wholesale invasion of Transoxiana. The slave trade in the Emirate of Bukhara became prominent and was established at this time. The Khanate of Bukhara was eventually invaded by the foreign government of Persia in 1740, and then became a part of the Persian empire of the day.

Before the arrival of the Russians, present-day Uzbekistan was divided between the Emirate of Bukhara and the khanates of Khiva and Kokand.

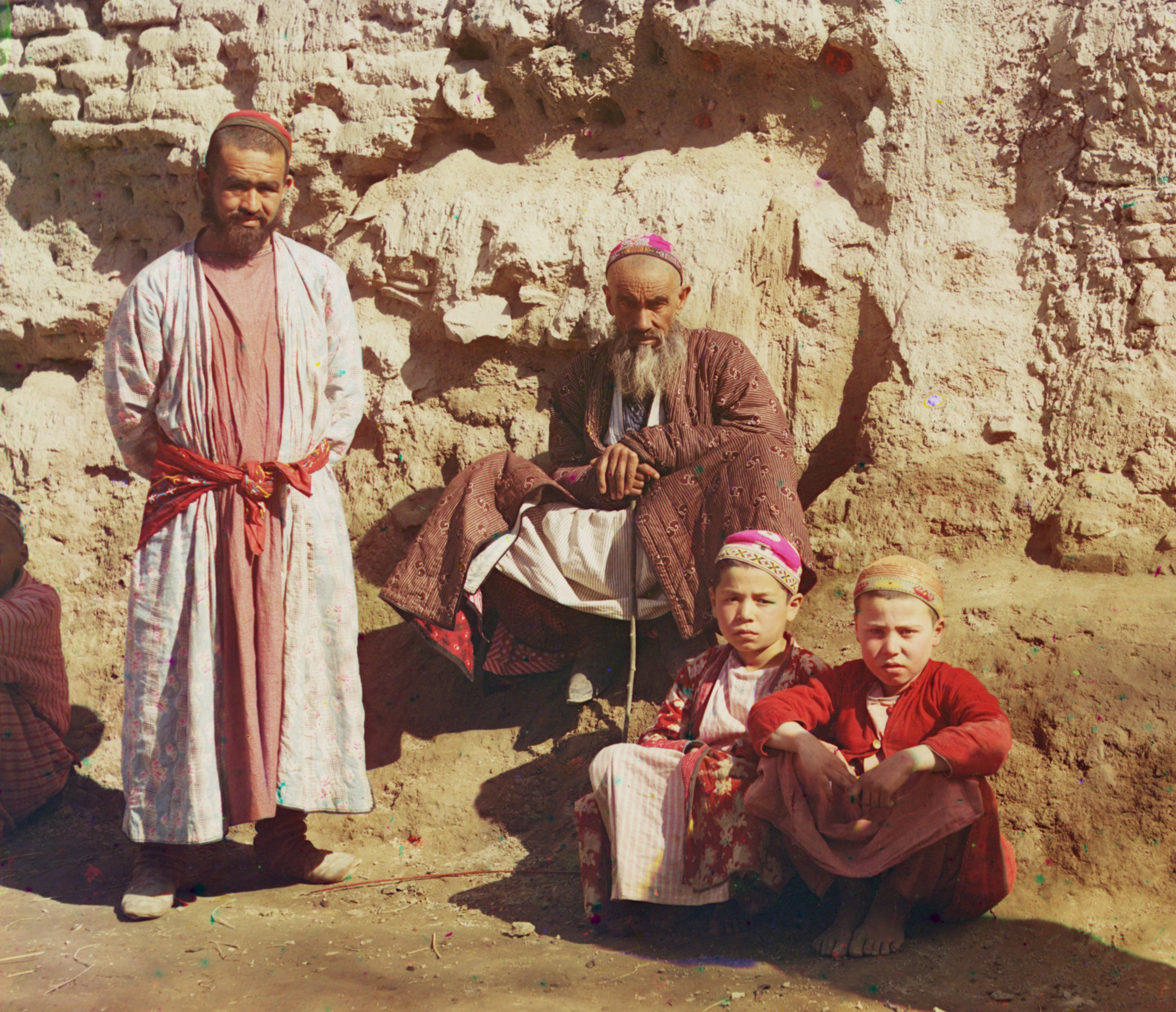
Two Sart men and two Sart boys in Samarkand, c. 1910

=== Russian conquest ===
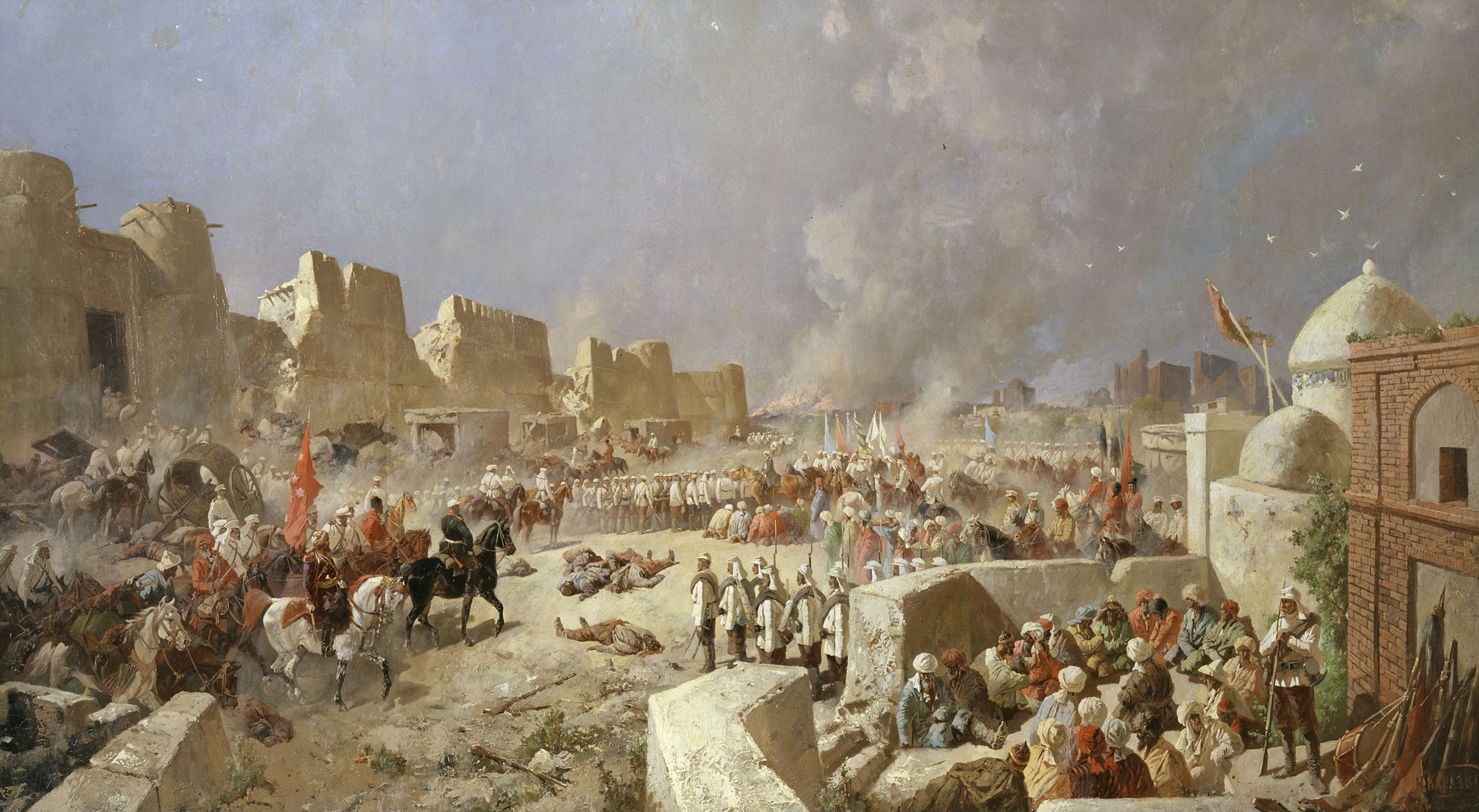
Russian troops taking Samarkand in 1868, by Nikolay Karazin

In the 19th century, the Russian Empire began to expand and spread into Central Asia. There were 210,306 Russians living in Uzbekistan in 1912. The 'Great Game' period is generally regarded as running from approximately 1813 to the Anglo-Russian Convention of 1907. A second, less intensive phase followed the Bolshevik Revolution of 1917. At the start of the 19th century, there were some 3,200 kilometres (2,000 mi) separating British India and the outlying regions of Tsarist Russia. Much of the land between was unmapped.

=== Soviet period ===
By the beginning of 1920, Central Asia was firmly in the hands of Russia and, despite some early resistance to the Bolsheviks, Uzbekistan and the rest of Central Asia became a part of the Soviet Union. On 27 October 1924, the Uzbek Soviet Socialist Republic was created. From 1941 to 1945, during World War II, 1,433,230 people from Uzbekistan fought in the Red Army against Nazi Germany. As many as 263,005 Uzbek soldiers died in the battlefields of the Eastern Front, and 32,670 went missing in action.

During the Soviet–Afghan War, about 65,000 Uzbek troops fought in neighbouring Afghanistan. At least 1,500 lost their lives and thousands more were paralysed.

=== Independence ===
On 20 June 1990, Uzbekistan declared its state sovereignty. On 31 August 1991, Uzbekistan declared independence following the failed coup attempt in Moscow. 1 September was proclaimed National Independence Day. The Soviet Union was dissolved on 26 December of that year. Islam Karimov, who had been first secretary of the Communist Party of Uzbekistan since 1989, was elected president of the Uzbek Soviet Socialist Republic in 1990. After the collapse of the Soviet Union in 1991, he was elected president of independent Uzbekistan. An authoritarian ruler, Karimov died in September 2016. He was replaced by his long-time Prime Minister, Shavkat Mirziyoyev, on 14 December of the same year. On 6 November 2021, Mirziyoyev was sworn in for a second term after gaining a landslide victory in the presidential election.

== Geography ==
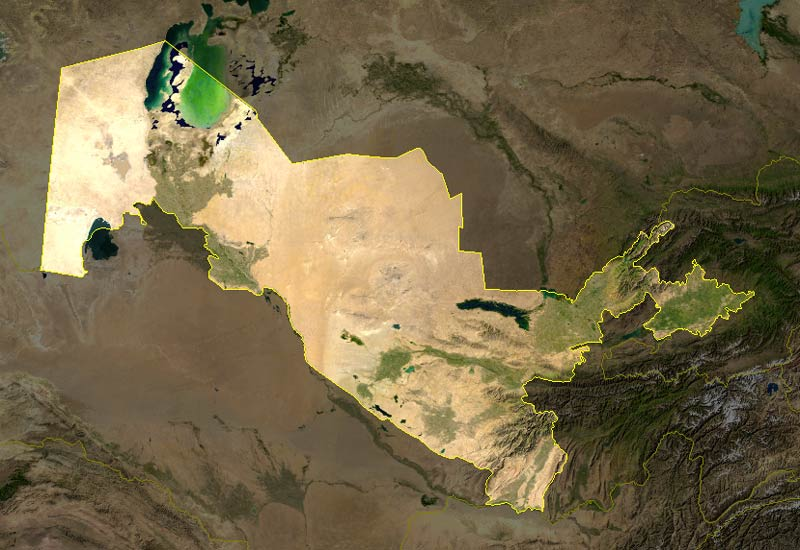
Satellite image of Uzbekistan (March 2005)

Uzbekistan has an area of 448,978 square kilometres (173,351 sq mi). It is the 56th largest country in the world by area and the 40th by population. Among the CIS countries, it is the fourth largest by area and the second largest by population.

Uzbekistan lies between latitudes 37° and 46° N, and longitudes 56° and 74° E. It stretches 1,425 kilometres (885 mi) from west to east and 930 kilometres (580 mi) from north to south. Bordering Kazakhstan and the Aralkum Desert (former Aral Sea) to the north and northwest, Turkmenistan and Afghanistan to the southwest, Tajikistan to the southeast, and Kyrgyzstan to the northeast, Uzbekistan is one of the largest Central Asian states and the only Central Asian state to border all the other four. Uzbekistan also shares a short border (less than 150 km or 93 mi) with Afghanistan to the south. Uzbekistan is home to six terrestrial ecoregions: Alai-Western Tian Shan steppe, Gissaro-Alai open woodlands, Badghyz and Karabil semi-desert, Central Asian northern desert, Central Asian riparian woodlands, and Central Asian southern desert.

Uzbekistan is a dry, doubly landlocked country. The only other doubly landlocked country is Liechtenstein. In addition, due to its location within a series of endorheic basins, none of its rivers lead to the sea. Less than 10% of its territory is intensively cultivated irrigated land in river valleys and oases. The Aral Sea, which has been largely desiccated by cotton production established in the Soviet era, is considered one of the world's worst environmental disasters. The rest is the vast Kyzylkum Desert and mountains.

Köppen climate classification

As published in its book of records in 2007, the generally accepted highest point in Uzbekistan is Khazret Sultan at 4,643 metres (15,233 ft) above sea level.

The climate in Uzbekistan is continental, with little precipitation expected annually (100–200 millimetres, or 3.9–7.9 inches). The average summer high temperature tends to be 40 °C (104 °F), while the average winter low temperature is around −23 °C (−9 °F).

=== Environment ===
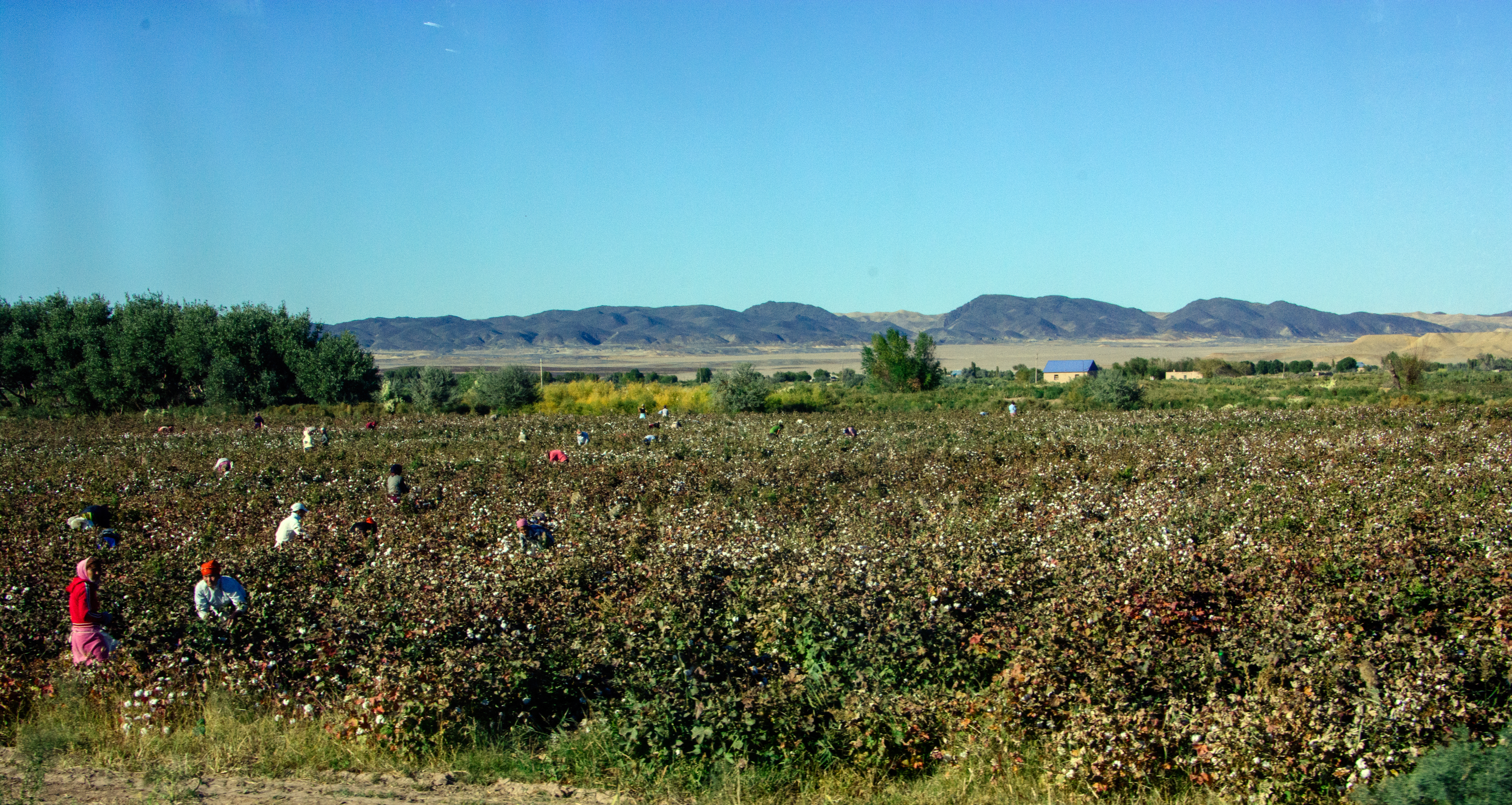
Cotton picking near Kyzyl-Kala, Karakalpakstan

Uzbekistan has a rich and diverse natural environment. However, decades of Soviet policies in pursuit of greater cotton production have resulted in a catastrophic scenario with the agricultural industry being the main contributor to the pollution and devastation of both air and water in the country.

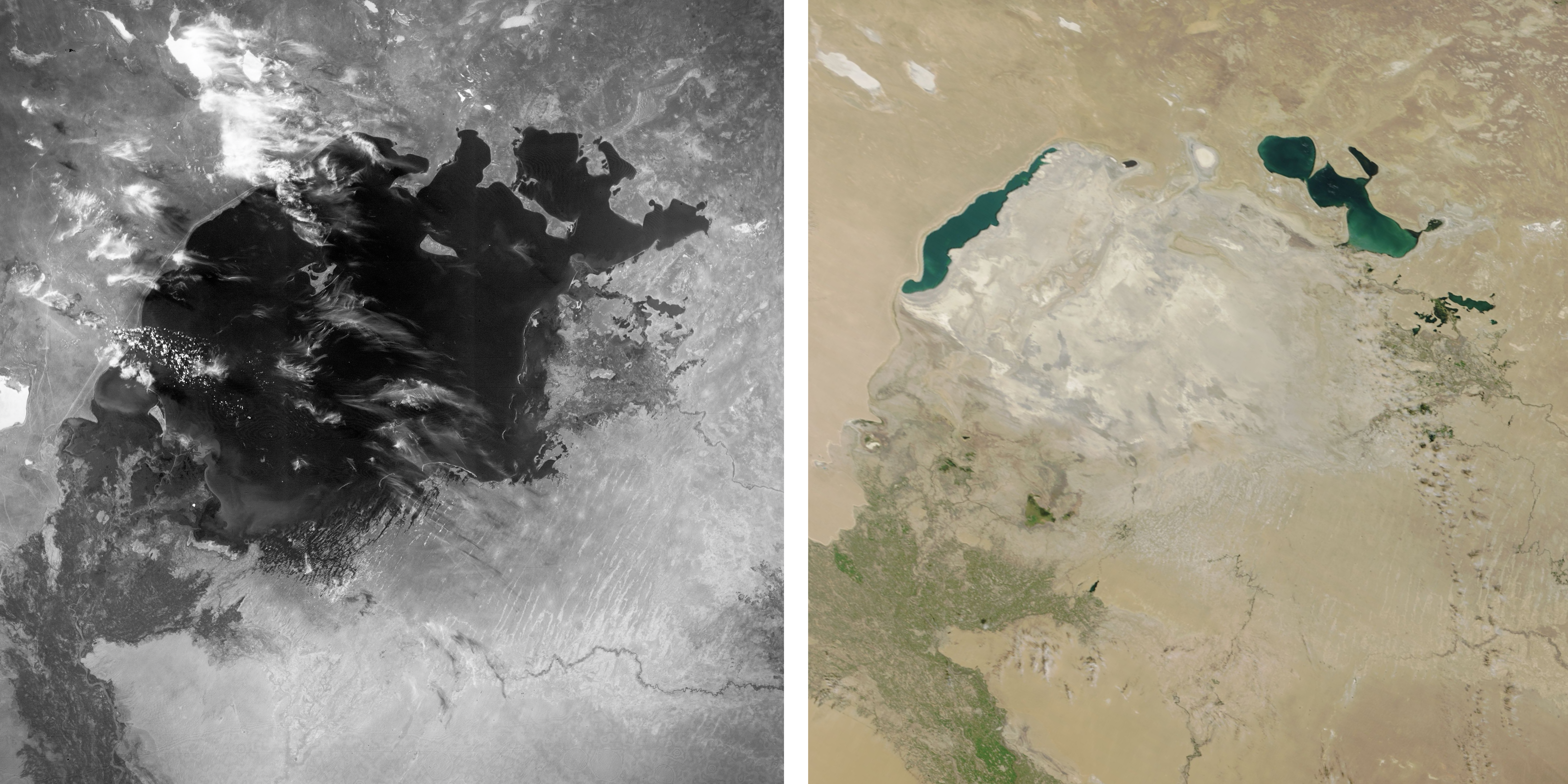
Comparison of the Aral Sea between August 22, 1964 and August 25, 2026

The Aral Sea was once the fourth-largest inland sea on Earth, humidifying the surrounding air and irrigating the arid land. Since the 1960s, when the overuse of the Aral Sea water began, it has shrunk to about 10% of its former area and divided into parts, with only the southern part of the narrow western lobe of the South Aral Sea remaining permanently in Uzbekistan. Much of the water was and continues to be used for the irrigation of cotton fields, a crop requiring a large amount of water to grow.

Due to the Aral Sea loss, high salinity and contamination of the soil with heavy elements are especially widespread in Karakalpakstan, the region of Uzbekistan adjacent to the Aral Sea. The bulk of the nation's water resources is used for farming, which accounts for nearly 84% of the water use and contributes to high soil salinity. Heavy use of pesticides and fertilisers for cotton growing further aggravates soil contamination.

Map of flooded areas as a result of the collapse of the Sardoba Reservoir

According to the UNDP (United Nations Development Programme), climate risk management in Uzbekistan should consider its ecological safety.

Numerous oil and gas deposits have been discovered in the south of the country.

Uzbekistan has also been home to seismic activity, as evidenced by the 1902 Andijan earthquake, 2011 Fergana Valley earthquake, and 1966 Tashkent earthquake.

A dam collapse at Sardoba Reservoir in May 2020 flooded 35,000 hectares of land. Six people died and 111,000 evacuated with recovery estimates over 1.5 trillion som. The devastation extended into areas inside neighbouring Kazakhstan.

==== Air pollution ====
The air pollution situation in Uzbekistan throughout the 21st century has been characterised by steady deterioration, reflecting a long history of environmental problems. The increase in pollution began with local domestic emissions in the early 20th century, but Soviet industrialisation made a significant contribution, especially the evacuation of enterprises in the 1940s and the subsequent development of heavy industry, oil refining and chemical production in the 1950s–1980s. The decline in the level of the Aral Sea has created an additional source of salt and dust storms. In the post-Soviet period, the structure of pollution shifted: in the 2000s, the dominant factor was the growth of motor transport and the use of low-quality fuel, and in the 2010s, it was the increase in PM2.5 concentrations due to the construction boom and climatic conditions.

By 2020–2025, the combination of transport emissions, domestic heating, dust and meteorological inversions had led to a systemic environmental crisis, with Tashkent regularly ranking among the most polluted cities in the world. According to the World Bank, the average annual pollution level in the capital is more than six times higher than the WHO recommended level (5 μg/m³).

=== Responses to climate change ===
Uzbekistan's socioeconomic situation and geographic location make it highly vulnerable to the effects of climate change—particularly water stress—as much of the country consists of vast desert plains and arid regions. According to a risk assessment by The World Bank, more than a fifth of Uzbekistan's projected 2030 population (8 million people) will live in areas classified as very high climate‑risk (p. 11). The country has made progress in the agricultural sector, risk management, and adaptation and resilience strategies, but important gaps remain in the resilience of forest ecosystems, water‑resource management, business and financial continuity planning, and disaster communication. Uzbekistan also lacks an overarching national climate policy, limiting climate action to sector‑specific efforts.

Climate impacts on agriculture are already visible: crops have been affected differentially by temperature and water‑stress changes. Maize, potatoes, rice, watermelons, and wheat may experience positive yield changes, while cotton—the country's second most important crop—and high‑revenue fruit crops such as apples, cherries, and apricots are expected to face negative effects (p. 7).

At the same time, reforms are underway to support a transition toward a lower‑carbon economy, even as economic growth remains dependent on natural resources. Key solutions include expanding access to financing for lower‑income populations and improving access to safe sanitation, universal health care, information and communication technology, and social protections (p. 1).

== Government and politics ==
Shavkat Mirziyoyev
President

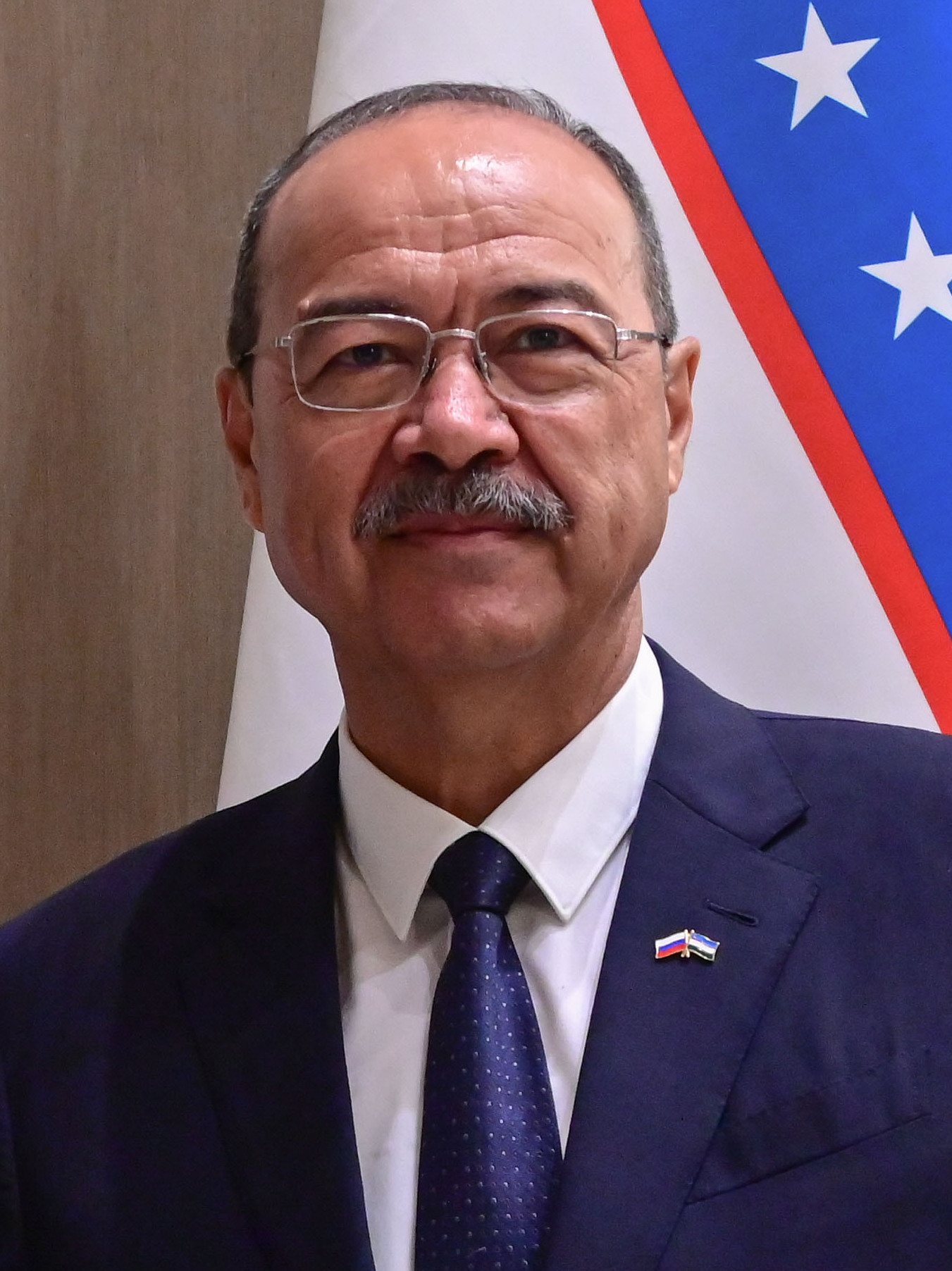
Abdulla Aripov
Prime Minister

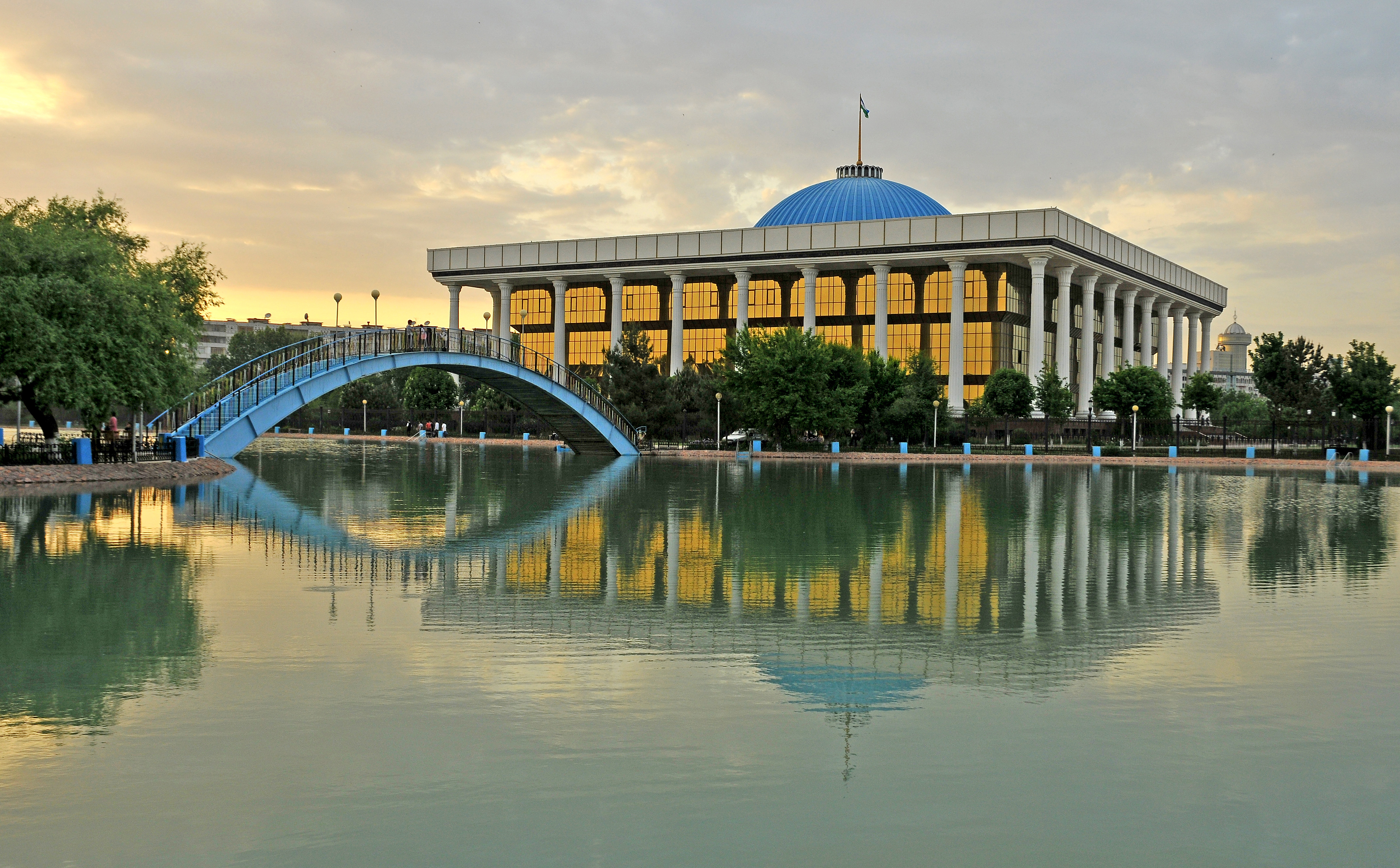
The Legislative Chamber of Uzbekistan (Lower House)

After Uzbekistan declared independence from the Soviet Union in 1991, an election was held, and Islam Karimov was elected as the first President of Uzbekistan on 29 December 1991. The elections of the Oliy Majlis (Parliament or Supreme Assembly) were held under a resolution adopted by the 16th Supreme Soviet in 1994. In that year, the Supreme Soviet was replaced by the Oliy Majlis. The third elections for the bicameral 150-member Oliy Majlis, the Legislative Chamber, and the 100-member Senate for five-year terms, were held on 27 December 2009. The second elections were held from December 2004 to January 2005. The Oliy Majlis was unicameral up to 2004. Its size increased from 69 deputies (members) in 1994 to 120 in 2004–05 and currently stands at 150.

Islam Karimov's first presidential term was extended to 2000 through a referendum. He was subsequently re-elected in 2000, 2007, and 2015, each time winning over 90% of the vote. However, most international observers refused to participate in the electoral process and dismissed the results as failing to meet democratic standards.

A 2002 referendum introduced a bicameral parliament, consisting of a lower house (the Oliy Majlis) and an upper house (the Senate), with members of the lower house serving as full-time legislators. Elections for the new parliament were held on 26 December 2002.

Following Karimov's death on 2 September 2016, the Oliy Majlis appointed Prime Minister Shavkat Mirziyoyev as interim president. While the constitution designated Senate Chairman Nigmatilla Yuldashev as the rightful successor, he declined the position, citing Mirziyoyev's extensive experience. In the December 2016 presidential election, Mirziyoyev was officially elected with 88.6% of the vote and was sworn in on 14 December. Deputy Prime Minister Abdulla Aripov then succeeded him as prime minister.

As president, Mirziyoyev replaced most of Karimov's officials and called for the inclusion of younger, patriotic individuals in government. Over time, he distanced himself from Karimov's policies, visiting various regions and cities to oversee reforms. Analysts and Western media have compared his leadership style to that of Deng Xiaoping and Mikhail Gorbachev, describing his tenure as a potential "Uzbek Spring".

According to International IDEA's Global State of Democracy (GSoD) Indices and Democracy Tracker, Uzbekistan performs in the low range on overall democratic measures, with particular weaknesses in local democracy, judicial independence and free political parties. The V-Dem Democracy Indices described Uzbekistan as a closed autocracy in 2024.

=== Administrative divisions ===
Uzbekistan is divided into twelve regions (viloyatlar, singular viloyat, compound noun viloyati e.g., Toshkent viloyati, Samarqand viloyati, etc.), one autonomous republic (respublika, compound noun respublikasi e.g. Qoraqalpogʻiston Muxtor Respublikasi, Karakalpakstan Autonomous Republic, etc.), and one independent city (shahar, compound noun shahri, e.g., Toshkent shahri, Tashkent City). Names are given below in Uzbek, and Karakalpak languages when applicable, although numerous variations of the transliterations of each name exist.

Division	Capital City	Area (km^{2})	Population (2026 census)	Key
Andijan Region; Uzbek: Андижон вилояти, Andijon Viloyati	Andijan; Andijon	4,303	3,531,777	2
Bukhara Region; Uzbek: Бухоро вилояти, Buxoro Viloyati	Bukhara; Buxoro	41,937	2,104,874	3
Fergana Region; Uzbek: Фарғона вилояти, Fargʻona Viloyati	Fergana; Fargʻona	7,005	4,238,911	4
Jizzakh Region; Uzbek: Жиззах вилояти, Jizzax Viloyati	Jizzakh; Jizzax	21,179	1,524,055	5
Republic of Karakalpakstan; Karakalpak: Қарақалпақстан Республикасы, Qaraqalpaqstan Respublikasıʻ; Uzbek: Қорақалпоғистон Республикаси, Qoraqalpogʻiston Respublikasi	Nukus; No‘kis; Nukus	161,358	2,149,932	14
Kashkadarya Region; Uzbek: Қашқадарё вилояти, Qashqadaryo Viloyati	Karshi; Qarshi	28,568	3,692,323	8
Khorezm Region; Uzbek: Хоразм вилояти, Xorazm Viloyati	Urgench; Urganch	6,464	2,140,746	13
Namangan Region; Uzbek: Наманган вилояти, Namangan Viloyati	Namangan; Namangan	7,181	3,149,161	6
Navoiy Region; Uzbek: Навоий вилояти, Navoiy Viloyati	Navoiy; Navoiy	109,375	1,184,591	7
Samarkand Region; Uzbek: Самарқанд вилояти, Samarqand Viloyati	Samarkand; Samarqand	16,773	4,404,575	9
Surkhandarya Region; Uzbek: Сурхондарё вилояти, Surxondaryo Viloyati	Termez; Termiz	20,099	2,984,084	11
Syrdarya Region; Uzbek: Сирдарё вилояти, Sirdaryo Viloyati	Gulistan; Guliston	4,276	954,361	10
Tashkent City; Uzbek: Тошкент, Toshkent Shahri	Tashkent; Toshkent	327	3,224,838	1
Tashkent Region; Uzbek: Тошкент вилояти, Toshkent Viloyati	Nurafshon; Nurafshon	15,258	3,763,093	12

The regions are further divided into districts (tuman).

=== Foreign relations ===
Uzbekistan joined the Commonwealth of Independent States in December 1991. However, it is opposed to reintegration and withdrew from the CIS collective security arrangement in 1999. Since that time, Uzbekistan has participated in the CIS peacekeeping force in Tajikistan and in UN-organised groups to help resolve the Tajikistan and Afghanistan conflicts, both of which it sees as posing threats to its own stability.

Previously close to Washington (which gave Uzbekistan half a billion dollars in aid in 2004, about a quarter of its military budget), the government of Uzbekistan has recently restricted American military use of the airbase at Karshi-Khanabad for air operations in neighbouring Afghanistan. Uzbekistan was an active supporter of U.S. efforts against worldwide terrorism.

The relationship between Uzbekistan and the United States began to deteriorate after the so-called "colour revolutions" in Georgia and Ukraine (and to a lesser extent Kyrgyzstan). When the U.S. joined in a call for an independent international investigation of the bloody events at Andijan, the relationship further declined, and President Islam Karimov changed the political alignment of the country to bring it closer to Russia and China.

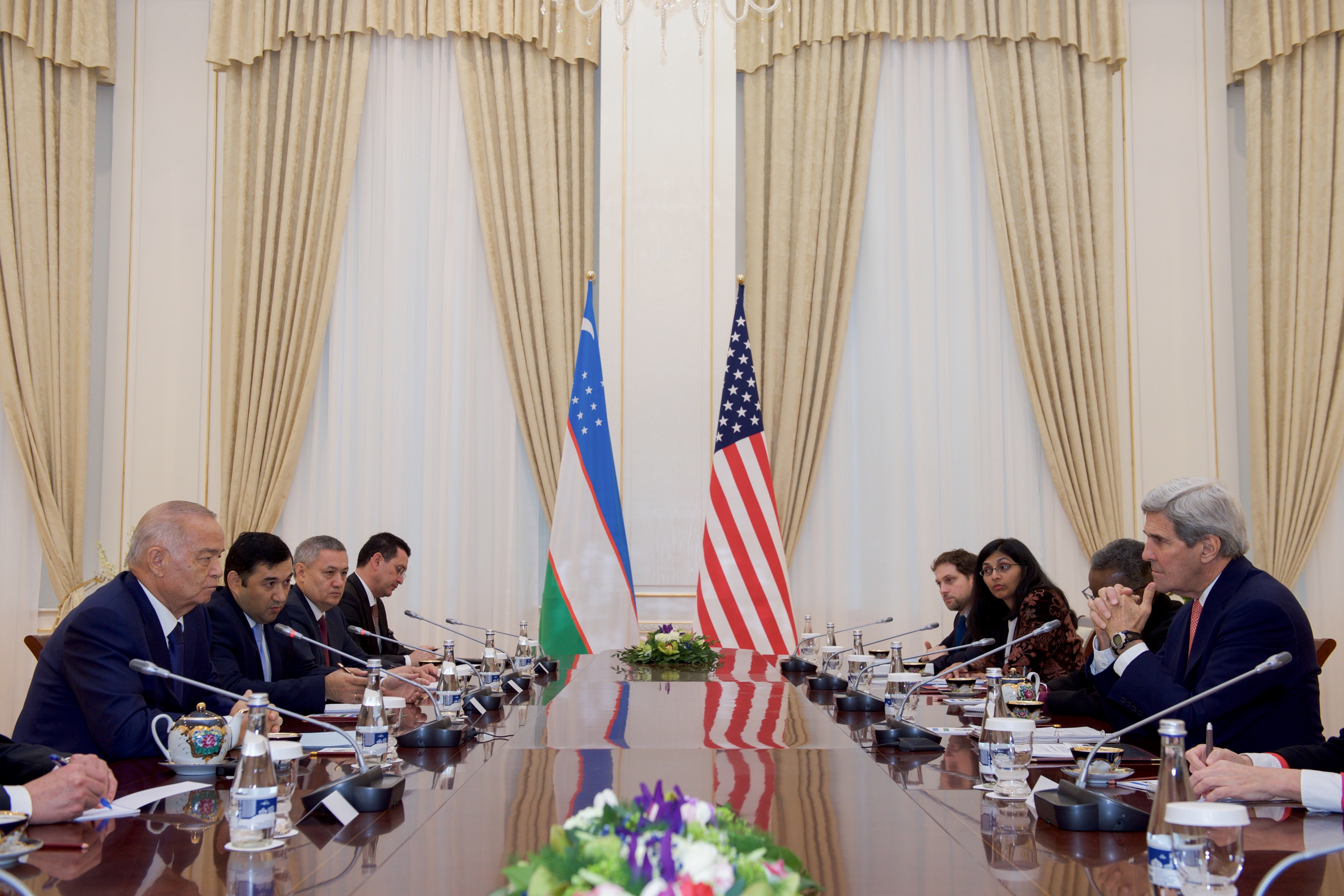
President Islam Karimov with U.S. Secretary of State John Kerry in Samarkand in November 2015

In late July 2005, the government of Uzbekistan ordered the United States to vacate an airbase in Karshi-Kanabad (near Uzbekistan's border with Afghanistan) within 180 days. Karimov had offered use of the base to the U.S. shortly after 9/11. It is also believed by some Uzbeks that the protests in Andijan were brought about by the UK and U.S. influences in the area of Andijan. This is another reason for the hostility between Uzbekistan and the West.

Uzbekistan is a member of the United Nations (UN) (since 2 March 1992), the Euro-Atlantic Partnership Council (EAPC), Partnership for Peace (PfP), and the Organization for Security and Co-operation in Europe (OSCE). It belongs to the Organisation of Islamic Cooperation (OIC) and the Economic Cooperation Organization (ECO) (comprising the five Central Asian countries, Azerbaijan, Iran, Turkey, Afghanistan, and Pakistan). In 1999, Uzbekistan joined the GUAM alliance (Georgia, Ukraine, Azerbaijan and Moldova), which was formed in 1997 (making it GUUAM), but pulled out of the organisation in 2005.

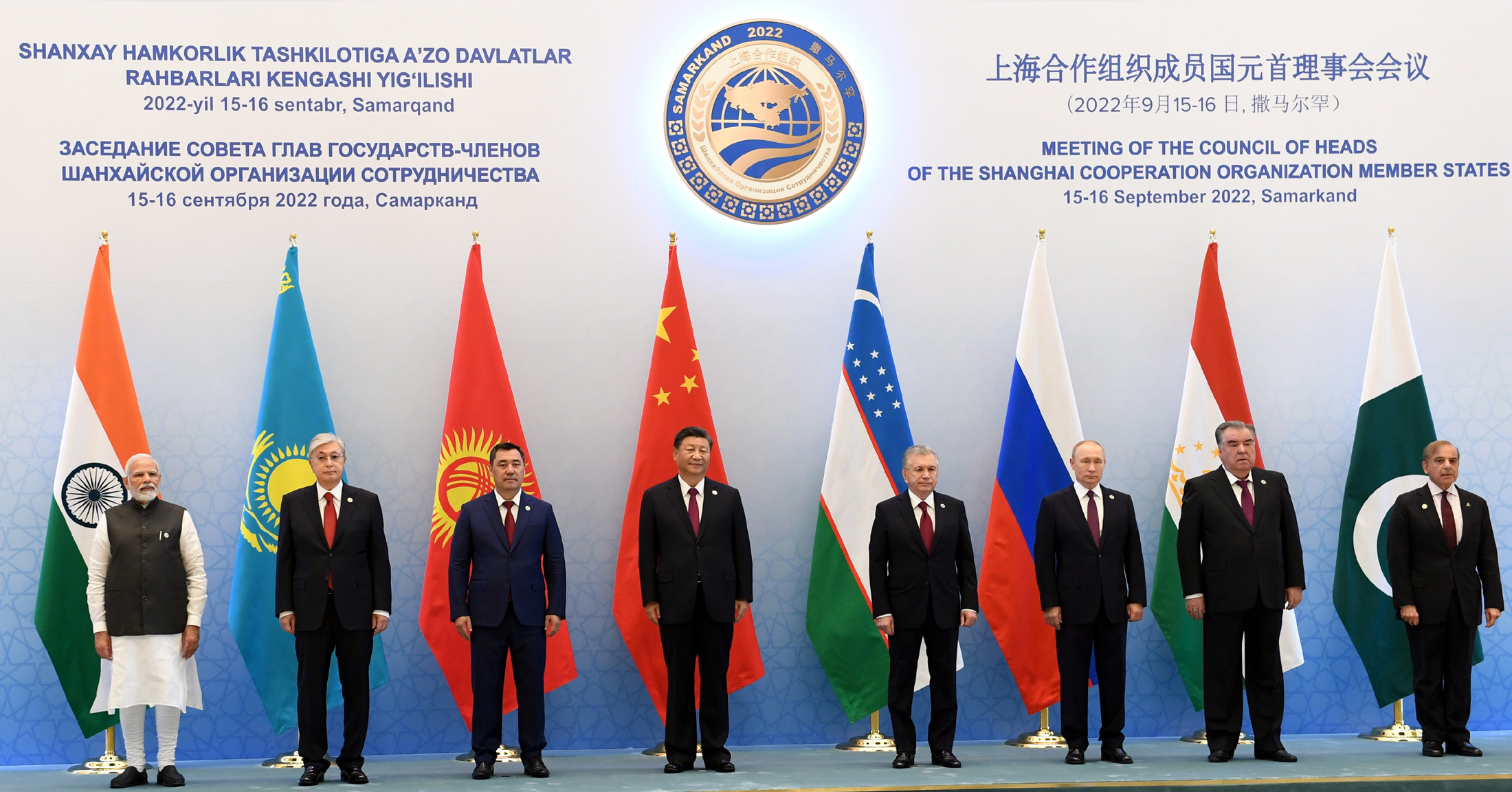
Leaders present at the SCO summit in Samarkand, Uzbekistan, in 2022

Uzbekistan is also a member of the Shanghai Cooperation Organisation (SCO) and hosts the SCO's Regional Anti-Terrorist Structure (RATS) in Tashkent. Uzbekistan joined the new Central Asian Cooperation Organisation (CACO) in 2002. The CACO consists of Uzbekistan, Tajikistan, Kazakhstan, and Kyrgyzstan. It is a founding member of, and remains involved in, the Central Asian Union, formed with Kazakhstan and Kyrgyzstan, and joined in March 1998 by Tajikistan.

In December 1994 Uzbekistan applied for the World Trade Organization membership and received an observer status to start the accession process. The Working Party on the Accession of Uzbekistan to the WTO held its fourth meeting on 7 July 2020—almost 15 years after its last formal meeting.

In September 2006, UNESCO presented Islam Karimov an award for Uzbekistan's preservation of its rich culture and traditions. Despite criticism, this seems to be a sign of improving relationships between Uzbekistan and the West.

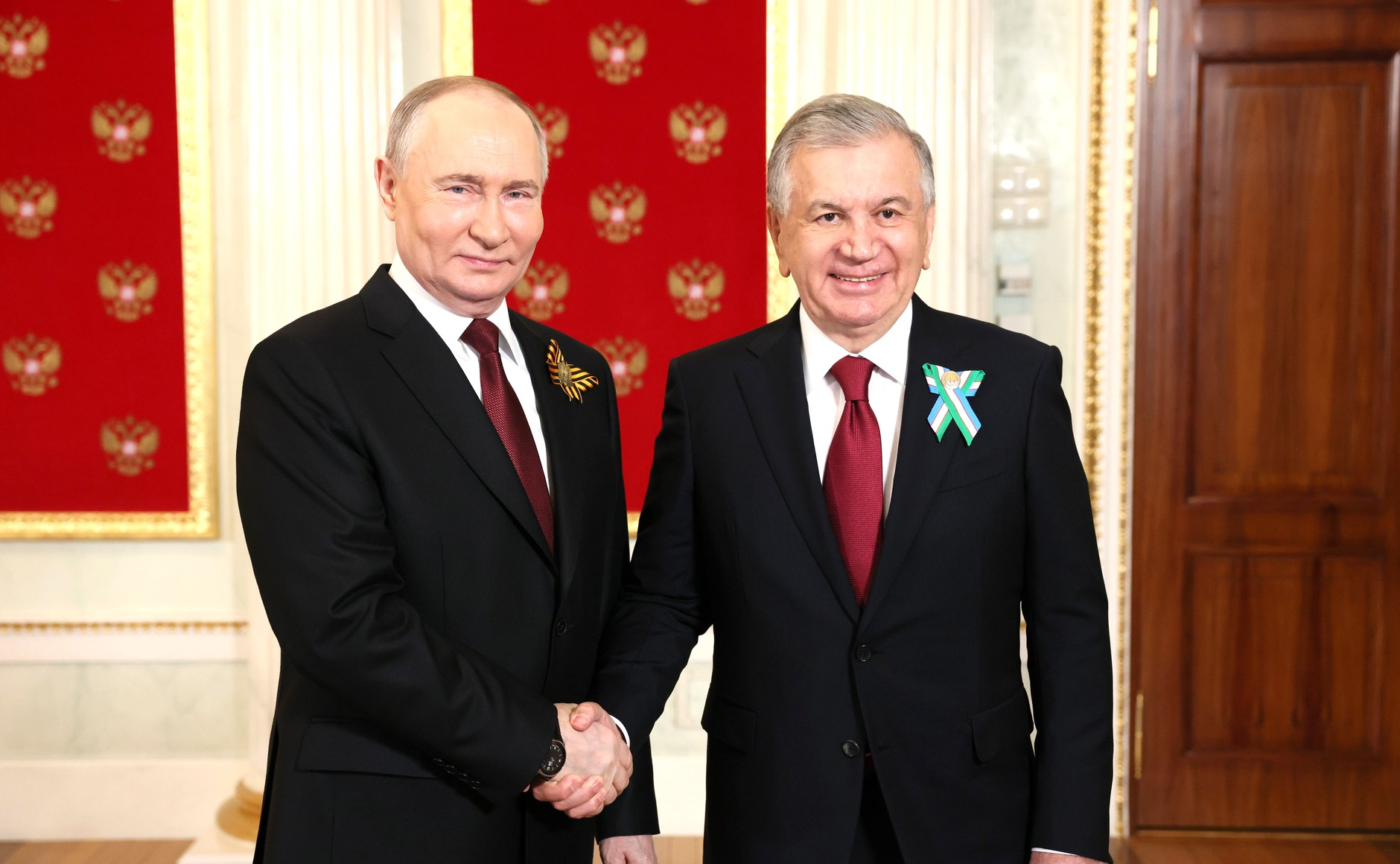
President Shavkat Mirziyoyev with Russian president Vladimir Putin before the Moscow Victory Day Parade in Moscow on 9 May 2024

The month of October 2006 also saw a decrease in the isolation of Uzbekistan from the West. The EU announced that it was planning to send a delegation to Uzbekistan to talk about human rights and liberties, after a long period of hostile relations between the two. Although it is equivocal about whether the official or unofficial version of the Andijan Massacre is true, the EU is evidently willing to ease its economic sanctions against Uzbekistan. Nevertheless, it is generally assumed among Uzbekistan's population that the government will stand firm in maintaining its close ties with the Russian Federation and in its theory that the 2004–2005 protests in Uzbekistan were promoted by the US and UK.

In January 2008, Lola Karimova-Tillyaeva was appointed to her current role as Uzbekistan's ambassador to UNESCO. Karimova-Tillyaeva and her team have been instrumental in promoting inter-cultural dialogue by increasing European society's awareness of Uzbekistan's cultural and historical heritage.

=== Military ===
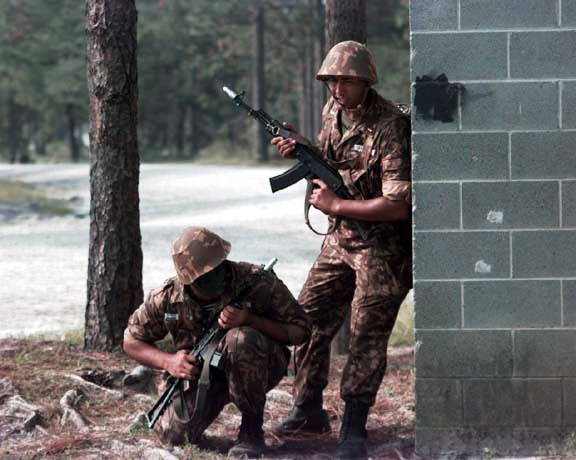
Uzbek troops during a cooperative operation exercise

With 120,000 servicemen, Uzbekistan possesses the largest armed forces in Central Asia. Military structure is largely inherited from the Turkestan Military District of the Soviet Army. The Uzbek Armed Forces' equipment is standard, mostly consisting of post-Soviet inheritance and newly crafted Russian and some American equipment.

The Government has accepted the arms control obligations of the former Soviet Union, acceded to the Nuclear Non-Proliferation Treaty (as a non-nuclear state), and supported an active programme by the U.S. Defence Threat Reduction Agency (DTRA) in western Uzbekistan (Nukus and Vozrozhdeniye Island). The Government of Uzbekistan spends about 3.7% of GDP on the military but has received a growing infusion of Foreign Military Financing (FMF) and other security assistance funds since 1998.

Following 11 September 2001 terrorist attacks in the United States, Uzbekistan approved the United States Central Command's request for access to an air base, the Karshi-Khanabad airfield, in southern Uzbekistan. However, Uzbekistan demanded that the United States withdraw from the airbases after the Andijan massacre and the US reaction to this massacre. The last US troops left Uzbekistan in November 2005. In 2020, it was revealed that the former US base was contaminated with radioactive materials which may have resulted in unusually high cancer rates in US personnel stationed there. Despite this, the government of Uzbekistan has denied this statement, claiming that there has never been such a case.

On 23 June 2006, Uzbekistan became a full participant in the Collective Security Treaty Organization (CSTO), but informed the CSTO to suspend its membership in June 2012.

=== Human rights ===
Non-governmental human rights organisations, such as IHF, Human Rights Watch, Amnesty International, as well as the United States Department of State and the Council of the European Union, characterise Uzbekistan as "an authoritarian state with limited civil rights" and express profound concern about "wide-scale violation of virtually all basic human rights". According to the reports, the most widespread violations include torture, arbitrary arrests, and various restrictions on freedoms, such as those of religion, speech, press, association, and assembly. It has also been reported that forced sterilisation of rural Uzbek women has been sanctioned by the government. The reports maintain that the violations are most often committed against members of religious organisations, independent journalists, human rights activists and political activists, including members of the banned opposition parties. As of 2015, reports on violations on human rights in Uzbekistan indicated that violations were still going on without any improvement. The Freedom House has consistently ranked Uzbekistan near the bottom of its Freedom in the World ranking since the country's founding in 1991. In the 2018 report, Uzbekistan was one of the 11 worst countries for Political Rights and Civil Liberties.

The 2005 civil unrest in Uzbekistan, which resulted in several hundred people being killed, is viewed by many as a landmark event in the history of human rights abuse in Uzbekistan. Concern has been expressed and requests for an independent investigation of the events has been made by the United States, the European Union, the United Nations, the OSCE Chairman-in-Office and the OSCE Office for Democratic Institutions and Human Rights.

The government of Uzbekistan is accused of unlawful termination of human life and of denying its citizens freedom of assembly and freedom of expression. The government vehemently rebuffs the accusations. In addition, some officials claim that "an information war on Uzbekistan has been declared" and the human rights violations in Andijan are invented by the enemies of Uzbekistan as a convenient pretext for intervention in the country's internal affairs. Male and female homosexuality is illegal in Uzbekistan. Punishment ranges from a fine to 3 years in prison.

There are an estimated 1.2 million modern slaves in Uzbekistan, most working in the cotton industry. The government allegedly forces state employees to pick cotton in the autumn months. World Bank loans have been connected to projects that use child labour and forced labour practices in the cotton industry.

==== Recent developments ====
Karimov died in 2016 and his successor Shavkat Mirziyoyev is considered by most to be pursuing a less autocratic path by increasing co-operation with human rights NGOs, scheduling Soviet-style exit visas to be abolished in 2019, and reducing sentences for certain misdemeanor offences.

The Amnesty International report on the country for 2017–2018 found some remnant repressive measures and lack of rule of law in eradicating modern slavery. In February 2020, the United Nations announced that Uzbekistan had made "major progress" on stamping out forced labour in its cotton harvest as 94% of pickers worked voluntarily.

The Anti-Corruption Agency was established in accordance with the Decree of the President of the Republic of Uzbekistan ‘On additional measures to improve the anti-corruption system in the Republic of Uzbekistan’ of June 29, 2020. Following its establishment, Akmal Burkhanov was appointed as the acting director.

== Economy ==
Development of real GDP per capita

Uzbekistan mines 80 tonnes of gold annually, ranking seventh in the world. In 2015, the country's gold production was 102 metric tonnes. Uzbekistan's copper deposits rank tenth in the world, and its uranium deposits twelfth. The country's uranium production ranks seventh globally. The Uzbek national gas company, Uzbekneftegaz, ranks 11th in the world in natural gas production, with an annual output of 60 to 70 billion cubic metres (2.1–2.5 trillion cubic feet). The country has significant untapped reserves of oil and gas: there are 194 hydrocarbon deposits in Uzbekistan, including 98 condensate and natural gas deposits and 96 gas condensate deposits.

Uzbekistan improved marginally in the 2020 Ease of Doing Business ranking by the World Bank. The largest corporations involved in Uzbekistan's energy sector are the China National Petroleum Corporation (CNPC), Petronas, the Korea National Oil Corporation, Gazprom, Lukoil, and Uzbekneftegaz.

Along with many Commonwealth of Independent States or CIS economies, Uzbekistan's economy declined during the first years of transition and then recovered after 1995, as the cumulative effect of policy reforms began to be felt. It has shown robust growth, rising by 4% per year between 1998 and 2003 and accelerating thereafter to 7%–8% per year. According to IMF estimates, the GDP in 2008 will be almost double its value in 1995 (in constant prices). Since 2003, annual inflation rates varied, reaching almost 40% in 2010 and less than 20% in 2019.

Uzbekistan has a GNI per capita of US$2,020 in 2018 dollars, resulting in a PPP equivalent of US$7,230. Economic production is concentrated in commodities. In 2011, Uzbekistan was the world's seventh-largest producer and fifth-largest exporter of cotton as well as the seventh-largest world producer of gold. It is also a regionally significant producer of natural gas, coal, copper, oil, silver and uranium.

Agriculture employs 27% of Uzbekistan's labour force and contributes 17.4% of its GDP (2012 data). Cultivable land is 4.4 million hectares, or about 10% of Uzbekistan's total area. While official unemployment is very low, underemployment – especially in rural areas – is estimated to be at least 20%. Cotton production in Uzbekistan is important to the national economy of the country. Uzbek cotton is used to make banknotes in South Korea. Uzbek cotton exports have become the cause of a scandal related to the Russian-Ukrainian war and sanctions imposed on the Russian military industry. According to the Organized Crime and Corruption Reporting Project (OCCRP), Vlast, and iStories, after 24 February 2022, Uzbekistan significantly increased its exports of cotton pulp and nitrocellulose to Russia, key components for the manufacture of explosives and gunpowder. According to Ekonomichna Pravda, at least two large Uzbek exporters have been working with Russian military-industrial complex enterprises. Documents from the Federal Tax Service of the Russian Federation confirm that at least three Russian companies – Bina Group, Khimtrade, and Lenakhim – sold imported cotton pulp in Russia to military plants under US sanctions. The use of child labour in Uzbekistan has led several companies, including Tesco, C&A, Marks & Spencer, Gap, and H&M, to boycott Uzbek cotton.

Uzbekistan is also a major producer of carrots, growing about 3.5 million tonnes a year.

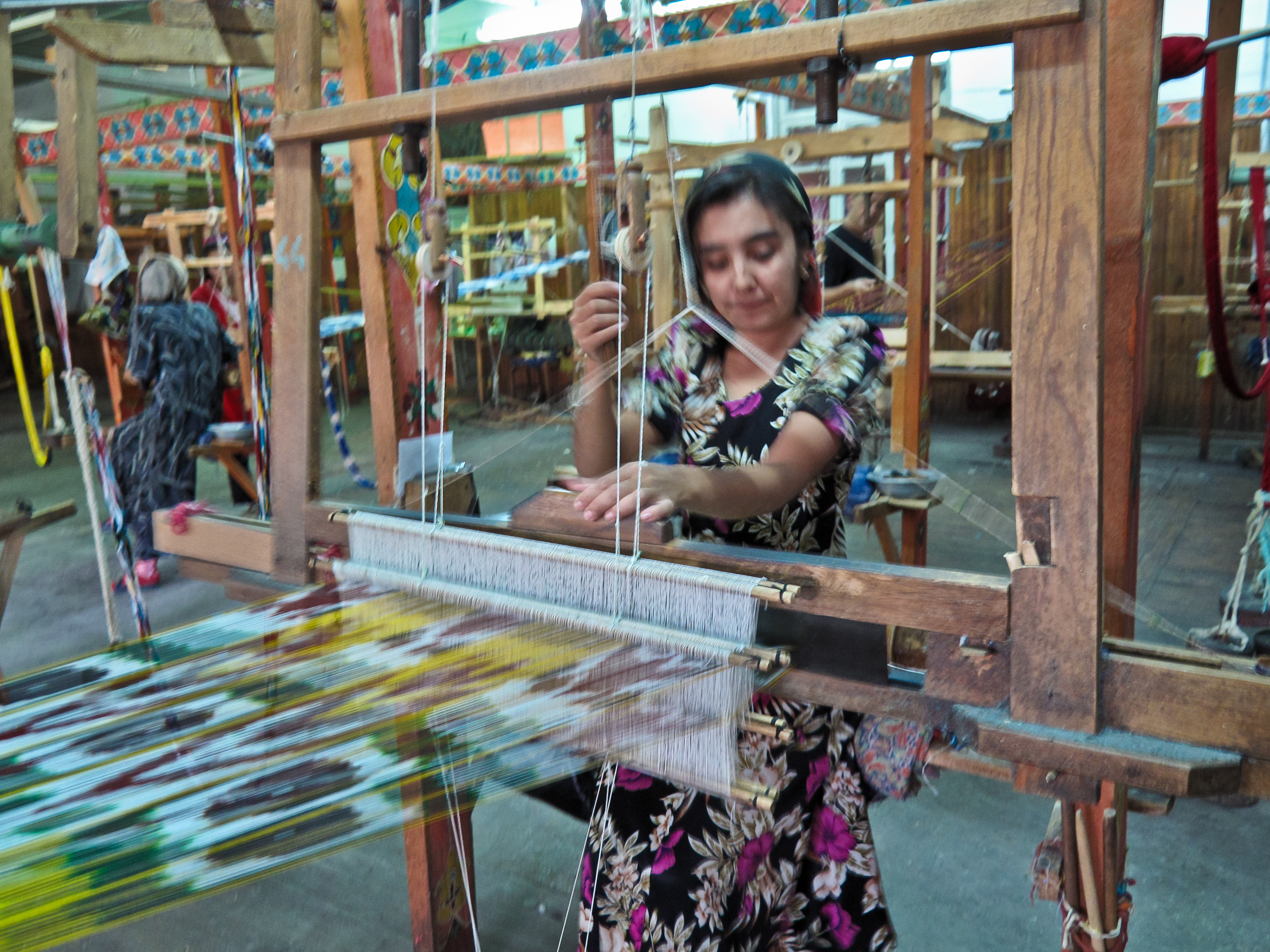
Yodgorlik silk factory

Facing a multitude of economic challenges upon acquiring independence, the government adopted an evolutionary reform strategy, with an emphasis on state control, reduction of imports and self-sufficiency in energy. Since 1994, the state-controlled media have repeatedly proclaimed the success of this "Uzbekistan Economic Model" and suggested that it is a unique example of a smooth transition to the market economy while avoiding shock, pauperism and stagnation. As of 2019, Uzbekistan's economy is one of the most diversified in Central Asia which makes the country an attractive economic partner for China.

The gradualist reform strategy has involved postponing significant macroeconomic and structural reforms. The state in the hands of the bureaucracy has remained a dominant influence in the economy. Corruption permeates the society and grows more rampant over time. A February 2006 report by the International Crisis Group suggests that revenues earned from key exports, especially cotton, gold, maize and increasingly gas, are distributed among a very small circle of the ruling elite, with little or no benefit for the populace at large. The early-2010s high-profile corruption scandals involving government contracts and large international companies, notably TeliaSonera, have shown that businesses are particularly vulnerable to corruption when operating in Uzbekistan.

According to the Economist Intelligence Unit, "the government is hostile to allowing the development of an independent private sector, over which it would have no control".

The economic policies have repelled foreign investment, which is the lowest per capita in the CIS. For years, the largest barrier to foreign companies entering the Uzbekistan market has been the difficulty of converting currency. In 2003 the government accepted the obligations of Article VIII under the International Monetary Fund (IMF) providing for full currency convertibility. However, strict currency controls and the tightening of borders have lessened the effect of this measure.

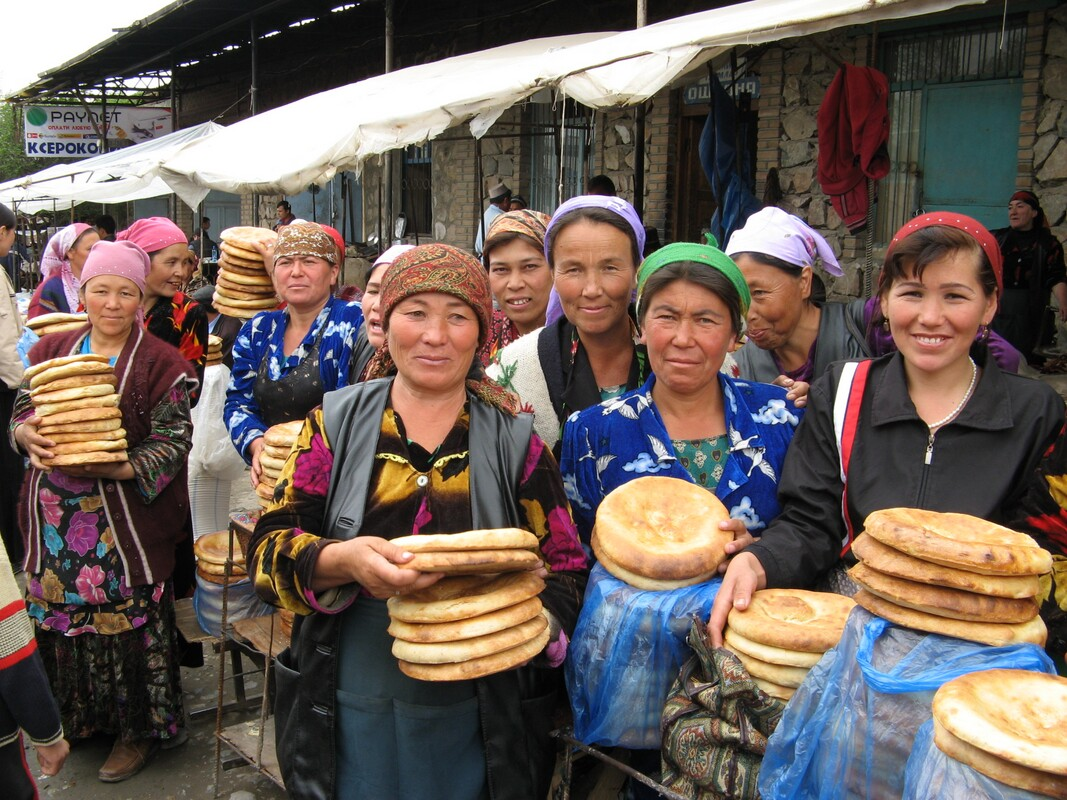
Bread sellers in Urgut selling Samarkand non

Uzbekistan experienced rampant inflation of around 1000% per year immediately after independence (1992–1994). Stabilisation efforts implemented with guidance from the IMF paid off. The inflation rates were brought down to 50% in 1997 and then to 22% in 2002. Since 2003 annual inflation rates averaged less than 10%. Tight economic policies in 2004 resulted in a drastic reduction of inflation to 3.8% (although alternative estimates based on the price of a true market basket put it at 15%). The inflation rates moved up to 6.9% in 2006 and 7.6% in 2007 but have remained in the single-digit range.

The government of Uzbekistan restricts foreign imports in many ways, including high import duties. Excise taxes are applied in a highly discriminatory manner to protect locally produced goods, although the excises taxes were removed for foreign cars in 2020. Official tariffs are combined with unofficial, discriminatory charges resulting in total charges amounting to as much as 100 to 150% of the actual value of the product, making imported products virtually unaffordable. Import substitution is an officially declared policy and the government proudly reports a reduction by a factor of two in the volume of consumer goods imported. A number of CIS countries are officially exempt from Uzbekistan import duties. Uzbekistan has a Bilateral Investment Treaty with fifty other countries.

The Republican Stock Exchange (RSE) opened in 1994. The stocks of all Uzbek joint stock companies (around 1,250) are traded on RSE. The number of listed companies as of January 2013 exceeds 110. Securities market volume reached 2 trillion in 2012, and the number is rapidly growing due to the rising interest by companies of attracting necessary resources through the capital market. According to Central Depository as of January 2013 par value of outstanding shares of Uzbek emitters exceeded 9 trillion.

Thanks in part to the recovery of world market prices of gold and cotton (the country's key export commodities), expanded natural gas and some manufacturing exports, and increasing labour migrant transfers, the current account turned into a large surplus (between 9% and 11% of GDP from 2003 to 2005). In 2018, foreign exchange reserves, including gold, totalled around US$25 billion.

Uzbekistan's IT sector is one of the fastest-growing parts of the national economy. By 2024, information and communication technologies accounted for around 2.1% of GDP, with steady growth since 2020 and IT service exports reaching about $1 billion. The sector's expansion is supported by IT-park, education programmes, and the entry of foreign companies. In 2024, the digital ecosystem Uzum became the country's first technology unicorn, valued at over $1 billion, increasing its valuation to $1.5 billion in 2025.

Foreign exchange reserves amounted in 2010 to US$13 billion.

Uzbekistan is predicted to be one of the fastest-growing economies in the world (top 26) in future decades, according to a survey by global bank HSBC. Uzbekistan was ranked 79th in the Global Innovation Index in 2025.

=== Communications ===
According to the official source report, as of 10 March 2008, the number of cellular phone users in Uzbekistan reached 7 million, up from 3.7 million on 1 July 2007. Mobile users in 2017 were more than 24 million. The largest mobile operator in terms of number of subscribers is MTS-Uzbekistan (formerly Uzdunrobita and part of Russian Mobile TeleSystems), followed by Beeline (part of Russia's Beeline) and UCell (formerly Coscom; originally part of the U.S. MCT Corp., now a subsidiary of the Nordic/Baltic telecommunications company TeliaSonera AB).

According to the official Household Sample Survey data released by the Statistics Agency under the President of the Republic of Uzbekistan (Stat.uz), the official share of the population using the internet reached 94.2%.

==== Censorship ====
Censorship in Uzbekistan exists, and in October 2012 the government toughened internet censorship by blocking access to proxy servers. Reporters Without Borders has named Uzbekistan's government an 'Enemy of the Internet', and government control over the internet has increased dramatically since the start of the Arab Spring.

The press in Uzbekistan practices self-censorship, and foreign journalists have been gradually expelled from the country since the Andijan massacre of 2005, when government troops fired into crowds of protesters, killing 187 according to official reports—and several hundred according to unofficial and witness accounts.

=== Transportation ===
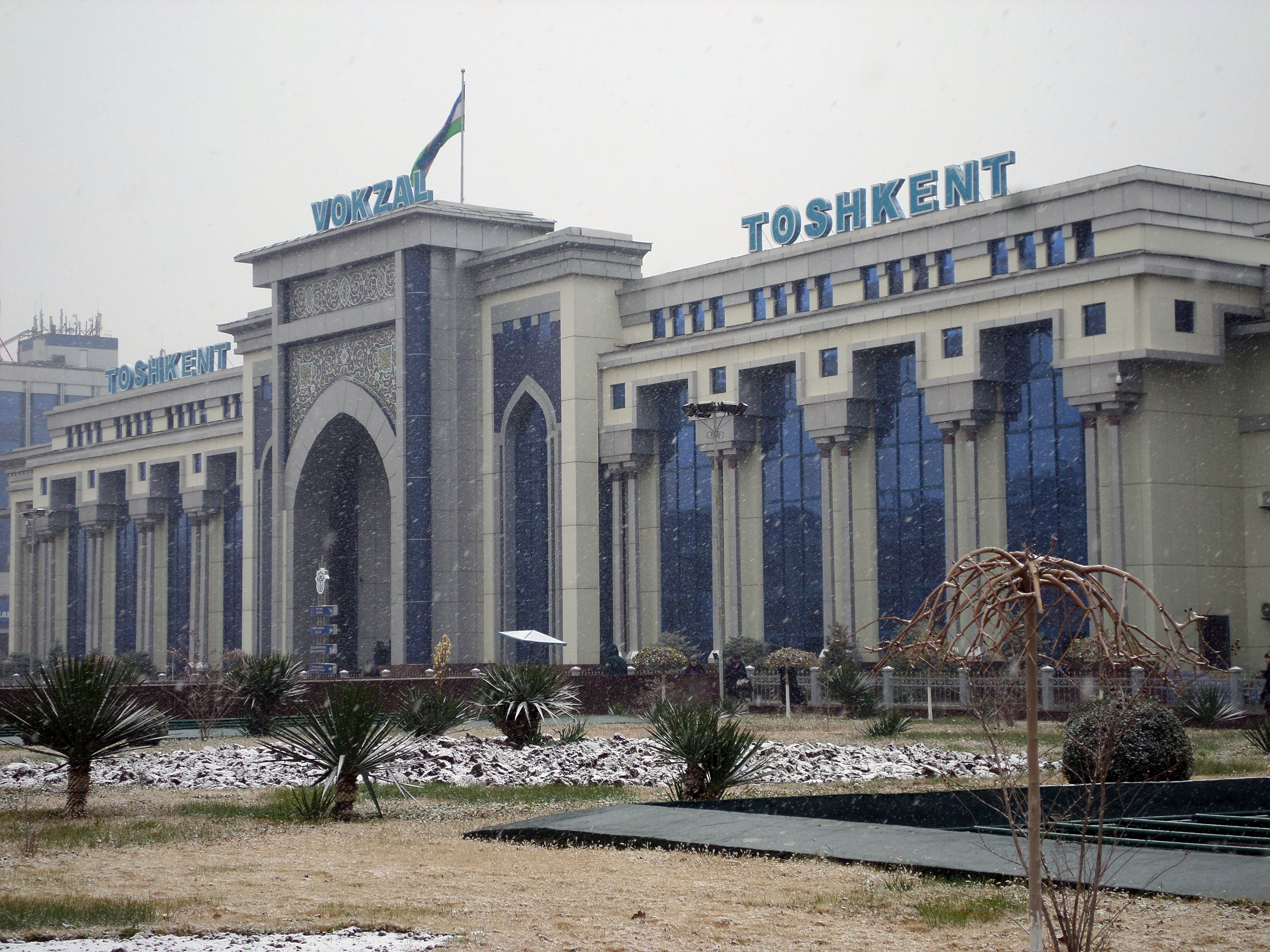
Central Station of Tashkent

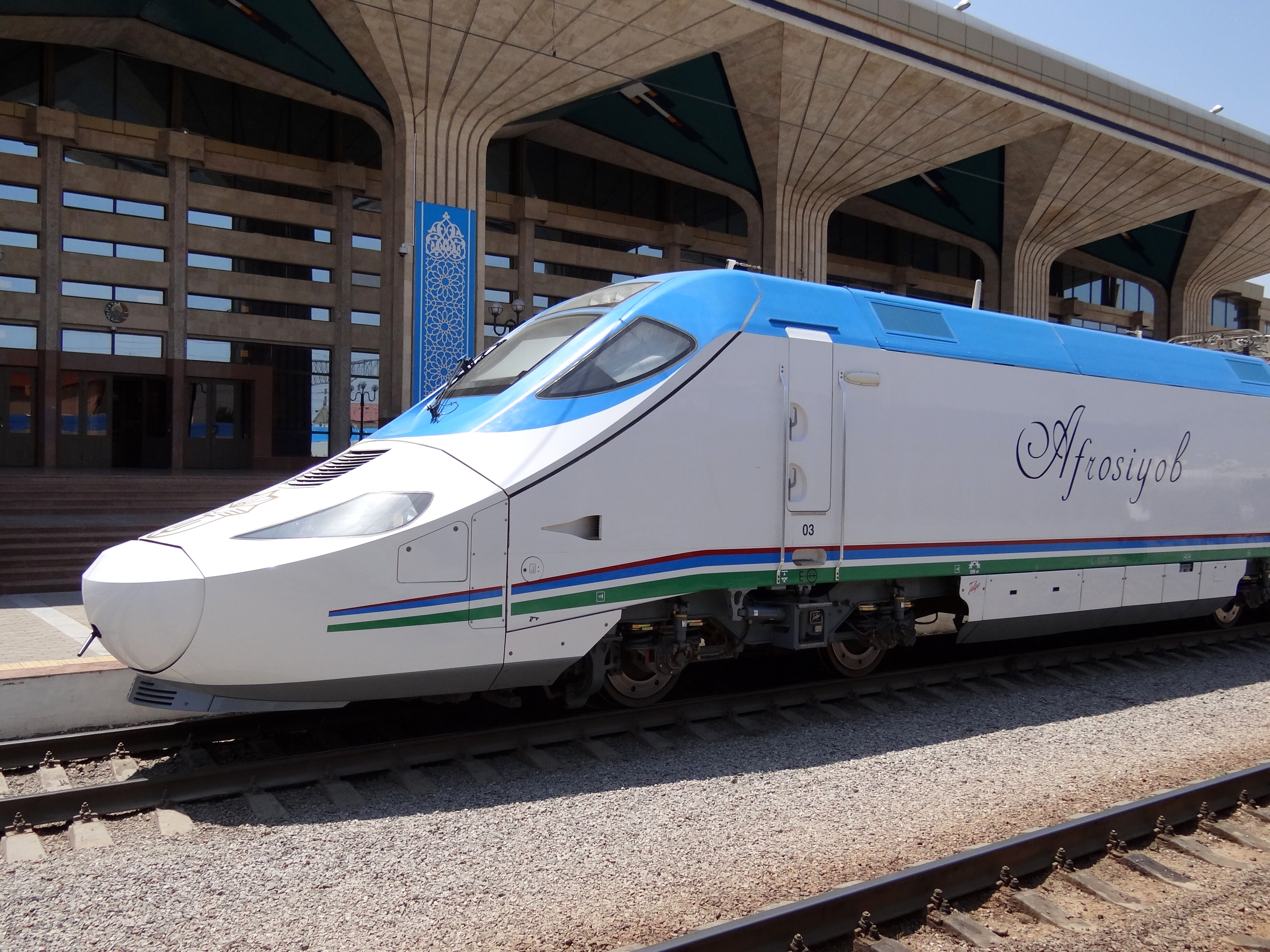
The Afrosiyob high-speed train

Tashkent, the nation's capital and largest city, has a four-line metro built in 1977, and expanded in 2001 after ten years' independence from the Soviet Union. Uzbekistan and Kazakhstan are currently the only two countries in Central Asia with a subway system. It is promoted as one of the cleanest systems in the former Soviet Union. The stations are exceedingly ornate. For example, the station Kosmonavtlar built in 1984 is decorated using a space travel theme to recognise the achievements of humankind in space exploration and to commemorate the role of Vladimir Dzhanibekov, the Soviet cosmonaut of Uzbek origin. A statue of Vladimir Dzhanibekov stands near a station entrance.

There are government-operated trams and buses running across the city. There are also many taxis, registered and unregistered. Uzbekistan has plants that produce modern cars. The car production is supported by the government and the Korean auto company Daewoo. In May 2007 UzDaewooAuto, the car maker, signed a strategic agreement with General Motors-Daewoo Auto and Technology (GMDAT, see GM Uzbekistan also). The government bought a stake in Turkey's Koc in SamKochAvto, a producer of small buses and lorries. Afterward, it signed an agreement with Isuzu Motors of Japan to produce Isuzu buses and lorries.

Train links connect many towns in Uzbekistan, as well as neighbouring former republics of the Soviet Union. Moreover, after independence two fast-running train systems were established. Uzbekistan launched the first high-speed railway in Central Asia in September 2011 between Tashkent and Samarqand. The new high-speed electric train Talgo 250, called Afrosiyob, was manufactured by Patentes Talgo S.L. (Spain) and took its first trip from Tashkent to Samarkand on 26 August 2011.

A large aircraft manufacturing plant was built during the Soviet era – Tashkent Chkalov Aviation Manufacturing Plant or ТАПОиЧ in Russian. The plant originated during World War II, when production facilities were evacuated south and east to avoid capture by advancing Nazi forces. Until the late 1980s, the plant was one of the leading aeroplane production centres in the USSR. With dissolution of the Soviet Union, its manufacturing equipment became outdated; most of the workers were laid off. Now it produces only a few planes a year, but with interest from Russian companies growing, there are rumours of production-enhancement plans.

==== Civil Aviation ====
After the declaration of independence of the Republic of Uzbekistan, in accordance with the Decree of the President of the Republic of Uzbekistan dated January 28, 1992, the National Airline Uzbekistan Airways was created on the basis of the Civil Aviation Department of Uzbekistan, which was under the jurisdiction of the former Ministry of Civil aviation of the Union. Air transport is one of the leading sectors of the economy of Uzbekistan, serves the development of international, economic, diplomatic, cultural ties of the country with the outside world. In Tashkent, Nukus, Samarkand, Bukhara, Urgench, Termez, Karshi, Namangan, Fergana, Navoi there are airports equipped with modern equipment. Tashkent International Airport is the largest international airport in the Central Asian region. The airports of Bukhara, Samarkand, and Urgench also have international status. The National Airline Uzbekistan Airways regularly performs 20 international flights. 44 representative offices have been opened in the cities of Europe, America, Southeast Asia and the CIS countries. Over the years of independence, the Government of the Republic of Uzbekistan has allocated 1.2 billion dollars to the aviation industry. Investments in the amount of US dollars were made and a developed modern infrastructure was built. All international flights are carried out on Boeing 767/757, A-310, U-85 aircraft. The national airline Uzbekistan Airways cooperates with large European companies Airbus Industry, American companies Boeing, Russian design bureau Ilyushin, German and French firms in various fields.

== Demographics ==
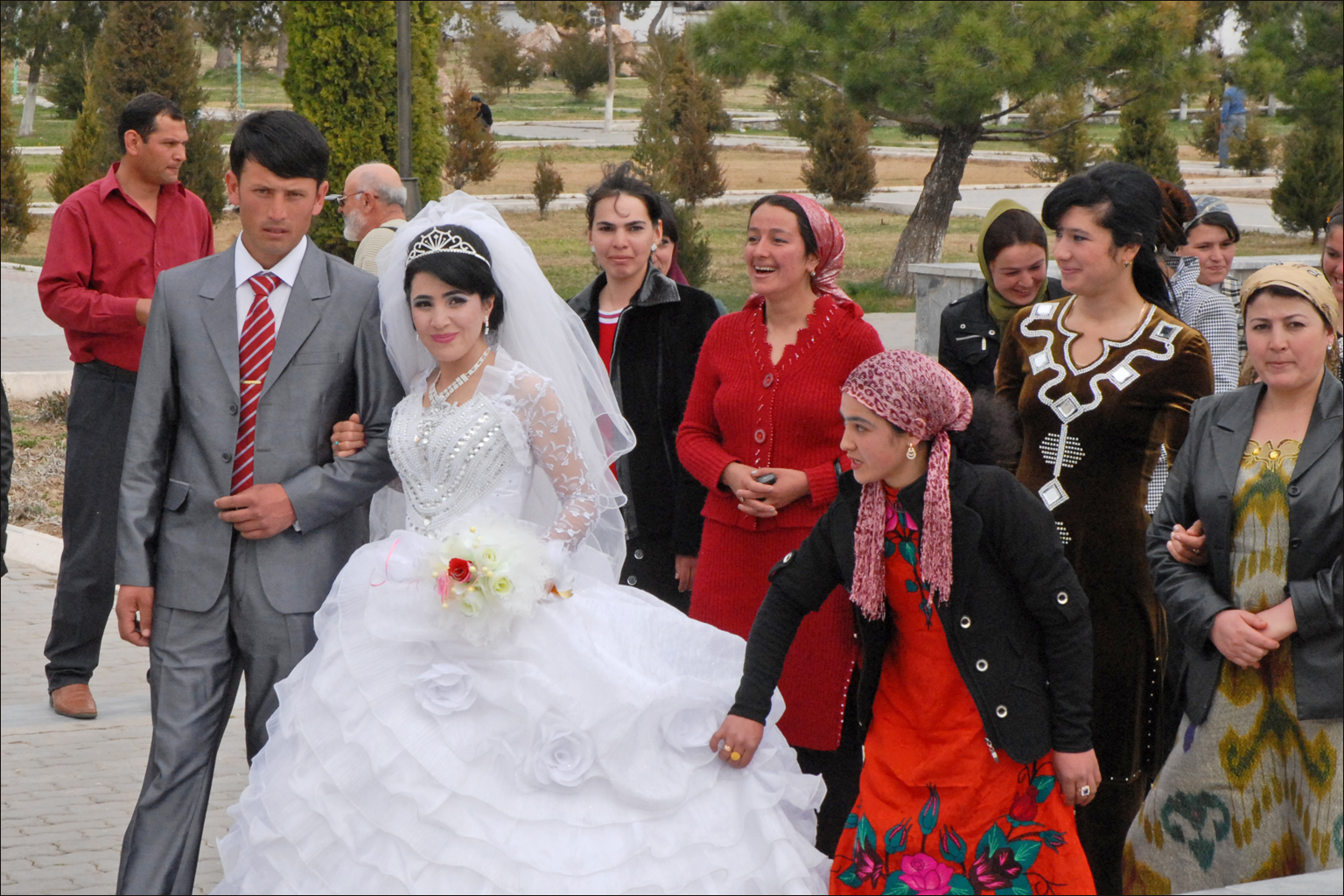
Newlywed couples visit Tamerlane's statues to receive wedding blessings

Nukus Art Museum named after Savicky.

As of 2026, Uzbekistan has the largest population of the countries in Central Asia. Its 39 million citizens comprise nearly half the region's total population. The population of Uzbekistan is very young, although it is slowly ageing. Of its people, 30.4% are younger than 15. Uzbeks are a majority (89.4%) of the population. Other ethnic groups include Tajiks 3.3%, Karakalpaks 2.2%, Kazakhs 1.8%, Russians 1.6%, and Turkmens 0.5% as of the 2026 census. In addition, 91.3% of respondents identified Uzbek as their native language in the same census.

The percentage of the ethnic Tajik population in Uzbekistan is controversial. While official state tabulations put the number at around 5%, the figure is said to be an understatement, and some Western academics put the number at approximately 25–30%. Uzbekistan has an ethnic Korean population that was forcibly relocated to the region by Stalin from the Soviet Far East in 1937–1938. There are also small groups of Armenians in Uzbekistan, mostly in Tashkent and Samarkand.

The nation is 96% Muslim (mostly Sunni, with a Shi'a minority), 2.3% Eastern Orthodox, and 1.7% other faiths. The U.S. State Department's International Religious Freedom Report 2004 reports that 0.2% of the population are Buddhist (these being ethnic Koreans). Bukharan Jews have lived in Central Asia, mostly in Uzbekistan, for thousands of years. There were 94,900 Jews in Uzbekistan in 1989 (about 0.5% of the population according to the 1989 census), but since the dissolution of the Soviet Union, most Central Asian Jews have left the region for the United States, Germany, or Israel. Fewer than 5,000 Jews remained in Uzbekistan in 2007, and they live primarily in Tashkent, Samarkand, and Bukhara.

Russians in Uzbekistan represented 5.5% of the total population in 1989. During the Soviet period, Russians and Ukrainians constituted more than half the population of Tashkent. The country counted nearly 1.5 million Russians, 12.5% of the population, in the 1970 census. After the dissolution of the Soviet Union, significant emigration of ethnic Russians has taken place, mostly for economic reasons.

In the 1940s, the Crimean Tatars, along with the Volga Germans, Chechens, Pontic Greeks, Kumyks, and many other nationalities were deported to Central Asia. Approximately 100,000 Crimean Tatars continue to live in Uzbekistan. The number of Greeks in Tashkent has decreased from 35,000 in 1974 to about 12,000 in 2004. The majority of Meskhetian Turks left the country after the pogrom in the Fergana Valley in June 1989.

Almost 10% of Uzbekistan's labour force works abroad, mostly in Russia and Kazakhstan.

Uzbekistan has a 100% literacy rate among adults older than 15 (2019 estimate).

Life expectancy in Uzbekistan is 68 years among men and 74 years among women.

=== Largest cities ===
Largest cities or towns in Uzbekistan
Rank	Name	Region	Pop.
1	Tashkent	Tashkent	2,955,700
2	Namangan	Namangan Region	678,200
3	Samarkand	Samarkand Region	573,200
4	Andijan	Andijan Region	468,100
5	Nukus	Karakalpakstan	310,000
6	Fergana	Fergana Region	299,000
7	Bukhara	Bukhara Region	285,000
8	Qarshi	Qashqadaryo Region	260,000
9	Kokand	Fergana Region	260,000
10	Margilan	Fergana Region	242,500

=== Languages ===
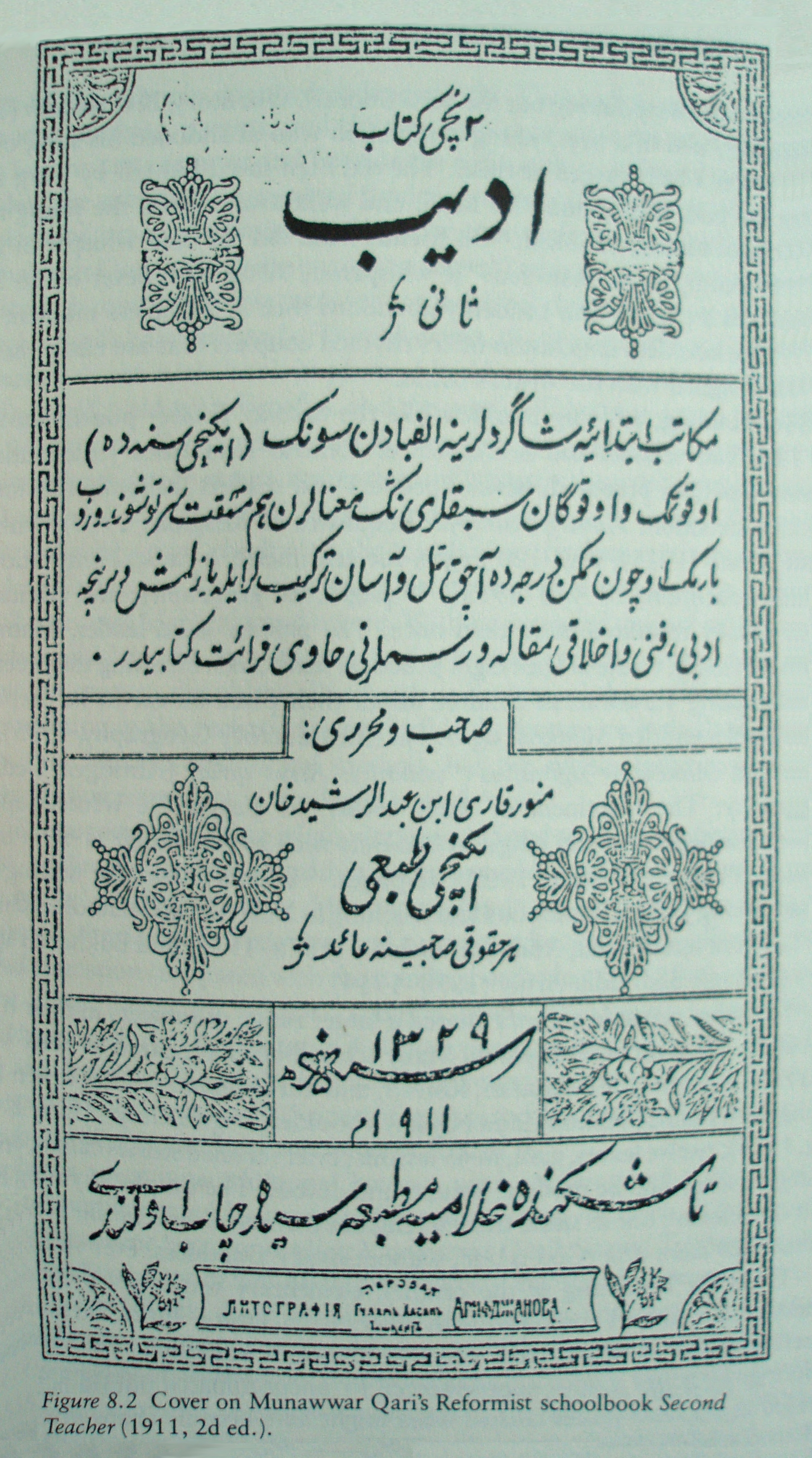
A page in Uzbek language written in Nastaʿlīq script printed in Tashkent in 1911

The Uzbek language is one of the Turkic languages. It belongs to the Karluk branch of the Turkic language family, which also includes the Uyghur language. Uzbek is the only official national language; since 1992, it is officially written in the Latin alphabet.

Before the 1920s, the written language of Uzbeks was called Turki (known to Western scholars as Chagatai) and used the Nastaʿlīq script. In 1926, the Latin alphabet was introduced and went through several revisions throughout the 1930s. Finally, in 1940, the Cyrillic alphabet was introduced by Soviet authorities and was used until the fall of Soviet Union. In 1993, Uzbekistan shifted back to the Latin script (Uzbek alphabet), which was modified in 1996 and has been taught in schools since 2000. Educational establishments teach only the Latin notation. At the same time, the Cyrillic notation is common among the older generation. Even though the Cyrillic notation of Uzbek has now been abolished for official documents, it is still used by a number of some newspapers and websites.

Karakalpak, belonging to the Kipchak branch of the Turkic language family and thus closer to Kazakh, is spoken by over 910,000 people, primarily in the Republic of Karakalpakstan, and has an official status in that territory.

Although the Russian language is not an official language in the country, it is widely used in many fields as a de facto second official language. Digital information from the government is bilingual. Signs throughout the country are both in Uzbek and Russian. A 2026 census shows that slightly more than 2% of the country's population are native speakers of Russian, and that the share of people with Russian as a mother tongue is 12.2% in Tashkent city and 24.6% in the Tashkent Region.

The Tajik language (a variety of Persian) is widespread in the cities of Bukhara and Samarkand because of their relatively large population of ethnic Tajiks. It is also found in large pockets in the Tashkent region, and Kasansay, Chust, Rishtan and Sokh in Ferghana Valley, as well as in Burchmulla, Ahangaran, Baghistan in the middle Syr Darya district, and finally in, Shahrisabz, Qarshi, Kitab and the river valleys of Kafiringan and Chaganian, forming altogether, approximately 25–30% of the population of Uzbekistan.

In April 2020, a draft bill was introduced in Uzbekistan to regulate the exclusive use of the Uzbek language in government affairs. Under this legislation, government workers could incur fines for doing work in languages other than Uzbek. Though unsuccessful, it was met with criticism by the Russian Ministry of Foreign Affairs spokeswoman, Maria Zakharova. In response, a group of Uzbek intellectuals signed an open letter arguing for the instatement of Russian as an official language alongside Uzbek, citing historical ties, the large Russian-speaking population in Uzbekistan, and the usefulness of Russian in higher education, together with the argument that only Russian language opened the communication with the other peoples of the region and the literature of the outside world. The Cyrillic Uzbek alphabet is still widely used, and 862 Russian-language schools are functioning in the country, compared to 1,100 in 1991, despite the fact that the Russian minority there has decreased from 1.7 million in 1990 to nearly 700,000 in 2022. In business, the Russian language outpaces Uzbek. Many Uzbeks in urban areas, as of 2019, are feeling more comfortable to speak in Russian, while Uzbek is more present in the agricultural regions. Uzbek did not manage to become a state language, and many blame the intelligentsia.

On September 15, 2020, citizenship amendments came into force that required foreigners to have proficiency in the Uzbek language before becoming citizens.

=== Religion ===
Religion in Uzbekistan (ARDA 2025 est.)
1. Islam (94.3%)
2. Christianity (1.17%)
3. None (4.26%)
4. Other (0.29%)

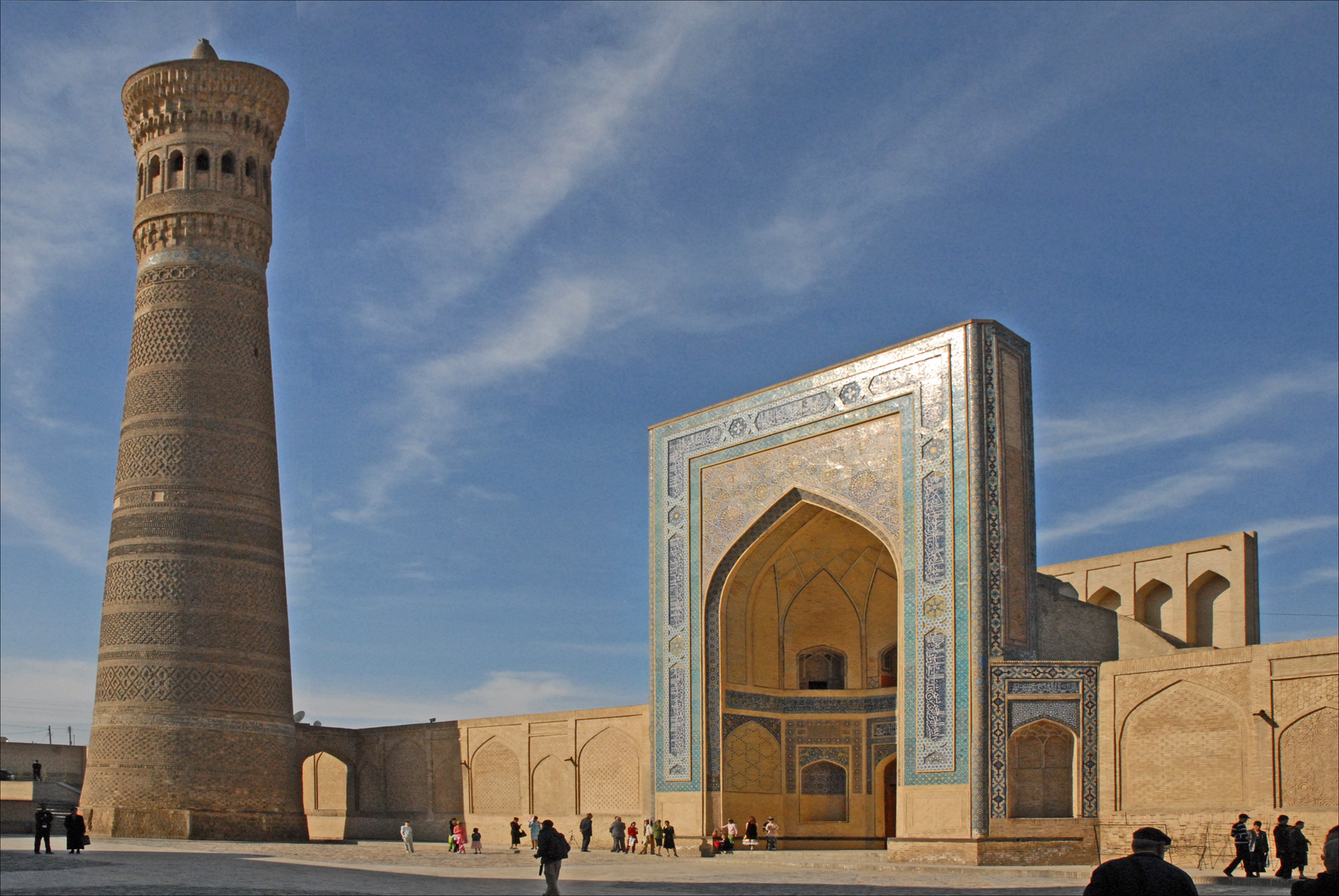
Mosque of Bukhara

Uzbekistan is a secular country and Article 61 of its constitution states that religious organisations and associations shall be separated from the state and equal before law. The state shall not interfere in the activity of religious associations. Islam is the dominant religion in Uzbekistan, although Soviet power (1924–1991) discouraged the expression of religious belief, and it was repressed during its existence as a Soviet Republic. The CIA Factbook (2004) estimates that Muslims constitute 88% of the population, while 9% of the population follow Russian Orthodox Christianity, 3% other religions and non-religious, while a 2020 Pew Research projection stated that Uzbekistan's population is 96.7% Muslim and Christians (mostly Russian Orthodox Christians) comprised 2.3% of the population (630,000). An estimated 93,000 Jews lived in the country in the early 1990s. In addition, there are about 7,400 Zoroastrians left in Uzbekistan, mostly in Tajik areas like Khojand.

Despite the predominance of Islam and its rich history in the country, the practice of the faith is far from monolithic. Uzbeks have practiced many versions of Islam. The conflict of Islamic tradition with various agendas of reform or secularisation throughout the 20th century has left a wide variety of Islamic practices in Central Asia.

The end of Soviet control in Uzbekistan in 1991 did not bring an immediate upsurge of religion-associated fundamentalism, as many had predicted, but rather a gradual re-acquaintance with the precepts of the Islamic faith and a gradual resurgence of Islam in the country. However, since 2015 there has been a slight increase in Islamist activity, with small organisations such as the Islamic Movement of Uzbekistan declaring allegiance to Daesh and contributing fighters abroad, although the terror threat in Uzbekistan itself remains low.

==== Jewish community ====
The Jewish community in the Uzbek lands lived for centuries, with occasional hardships during the reigns of certain rulers. During the rule of Tamerlane in the 14th century, Jews contributed greatly to his efforts to rebuild Samarkand, and a great Jewish centre was established there.

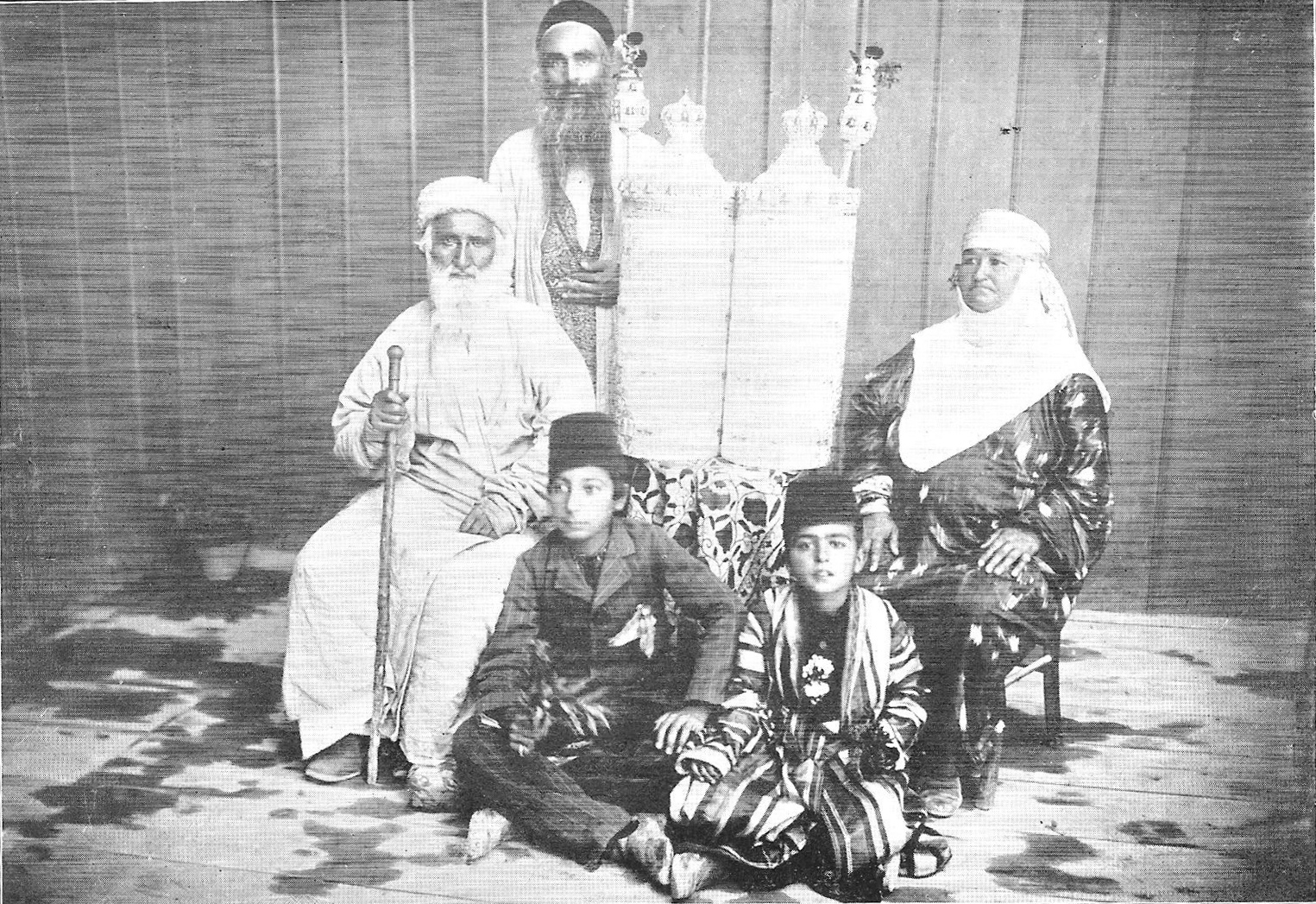
Bukharan Jews, c. 1899

After the area came under Russian rule in 1868, Jews were granted equal rights with the local Muslim population. In that period some 50,000 Jews lived in Samarkand and 20,000 in Bukhara.

After the Russian revolutions in 1917 and the establishment of the Soviet regime, Jewish religious life (as with all religions) became restricted. By 1935 only one synagogue out of 30 remained in Samarkand. Similarly only one synagogue was operational in Bukhara and in Tashkent. Young children were not allowed to enter synagogues. In spite of this underground Jewish community life continued during the Soviet era.

By 1970 there were 103,000 Jews registered in the Uzbek SSR. Since the 1980s most of the Jews of Uzbekistan emigrated to Israel or to the United States of America. A small community of several thousand remained in the country as of 2013: some 7,000 lived in Tashkent, 3,000 in Bukhara and 700 in Samarkand.

=== Education ===
Uzbekistan has a high literacy rate, with 99.9% of adults above the age of 15 being able to read and write. Nevertheless, only 76% of the under-15 population are currently enrolled in schools^{(and only 20% of the 3–6 year olds attending pre-school)}. Generally, the grading scale in Uzbek educational institutions is 2–5.

Uzbekistan has encountered severe budget shortfalls in its education programme. The education law of 1992 began the process of theoretical reform, but the physical base has deteriorated and curriculum revision has been slow. Corruption within the education system is rampant, with students from wealthier families routinely bribing teachers and school executives to achieve high grades without attending school, or undertaking official examinations.

Public spending on education in Uzbekistan in 2019 amounted to 5.6% of GDP and 6.2% of GDP in 2021. In 2019, of the total expenditure on education, the government spent the largest share on secondary education (about 65%), preschool education (21%), higher education (10%) and secondary special education (4%).

In 2023, UNICEF supported the Government of Uzbekistan in developing a Roadmap for Education Reform, which aims to bring together the efforts of the government, development partners, teachers, parents, students and school communities to achieve the outlined strategic goals of transformative quality education.

Several universities, including Westminster University, Turin University, Management University Institute of Singapore, Bucheon University in Tashkent, TEAM University and Inha University Tashkent maintain a campus in Tashkent offering English language courses across several disciplines. The Russian-language high education is provided by most national universities, including foreign Moscow State University and Gubkin Russian State University of Oil and Gas, maintaining campuses in Tashkent. As of 2019, Webster University, in partnership with the Ministry of Education (now Ministry of Higher Education, Science and Innovation), has opened a graduate school offering an MBA in Project Management and a MA in Teaching English as a Second Language (TESL).

There are three Islamic institutes and an academy in Uzbekistan. They are Tashkent islamic institute, Mir Arab high school, School of hadith knowledge, International islamic academy of Uzbekistan.

== Culture ==
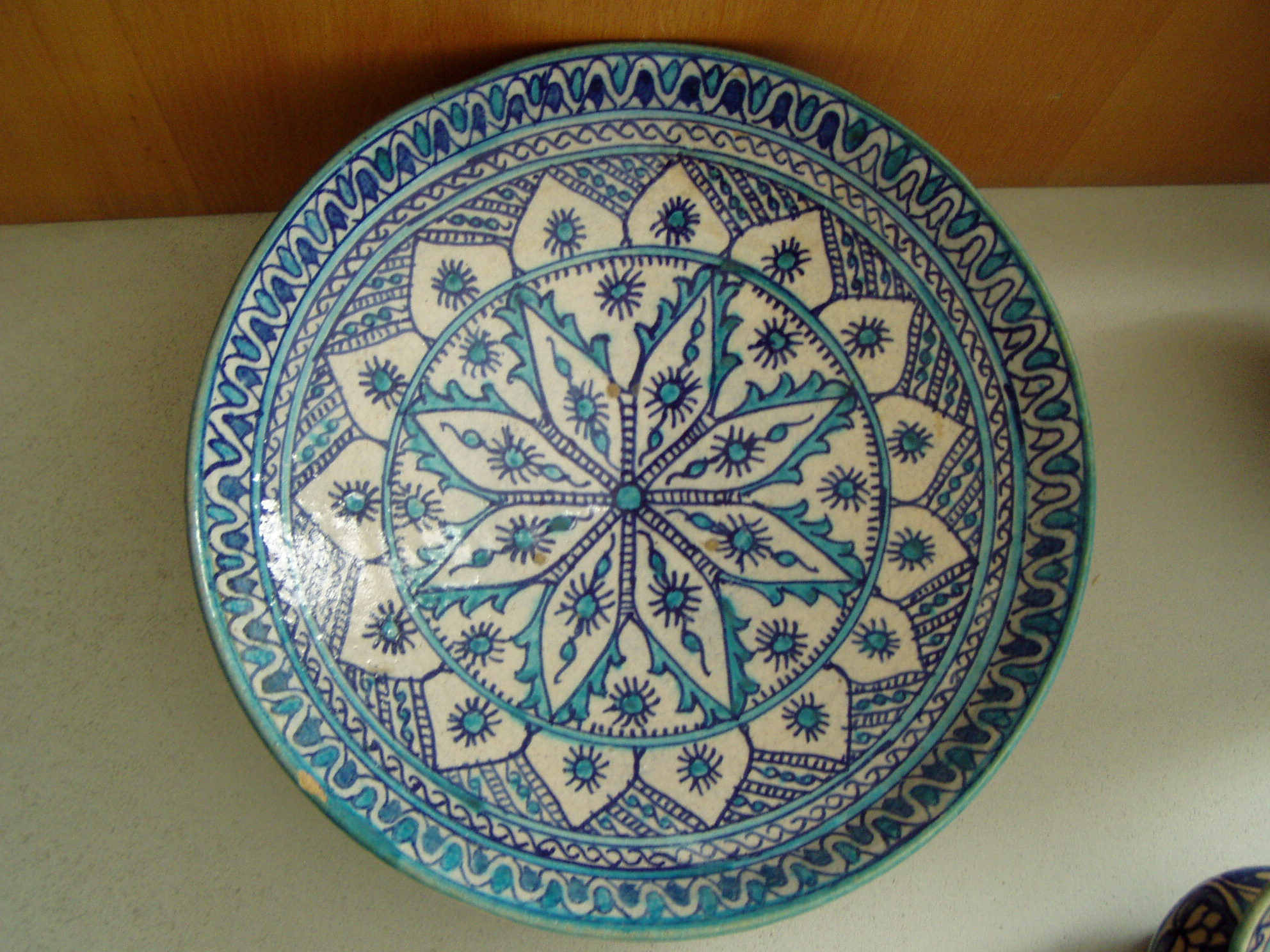
Traditional Uzbek pottery

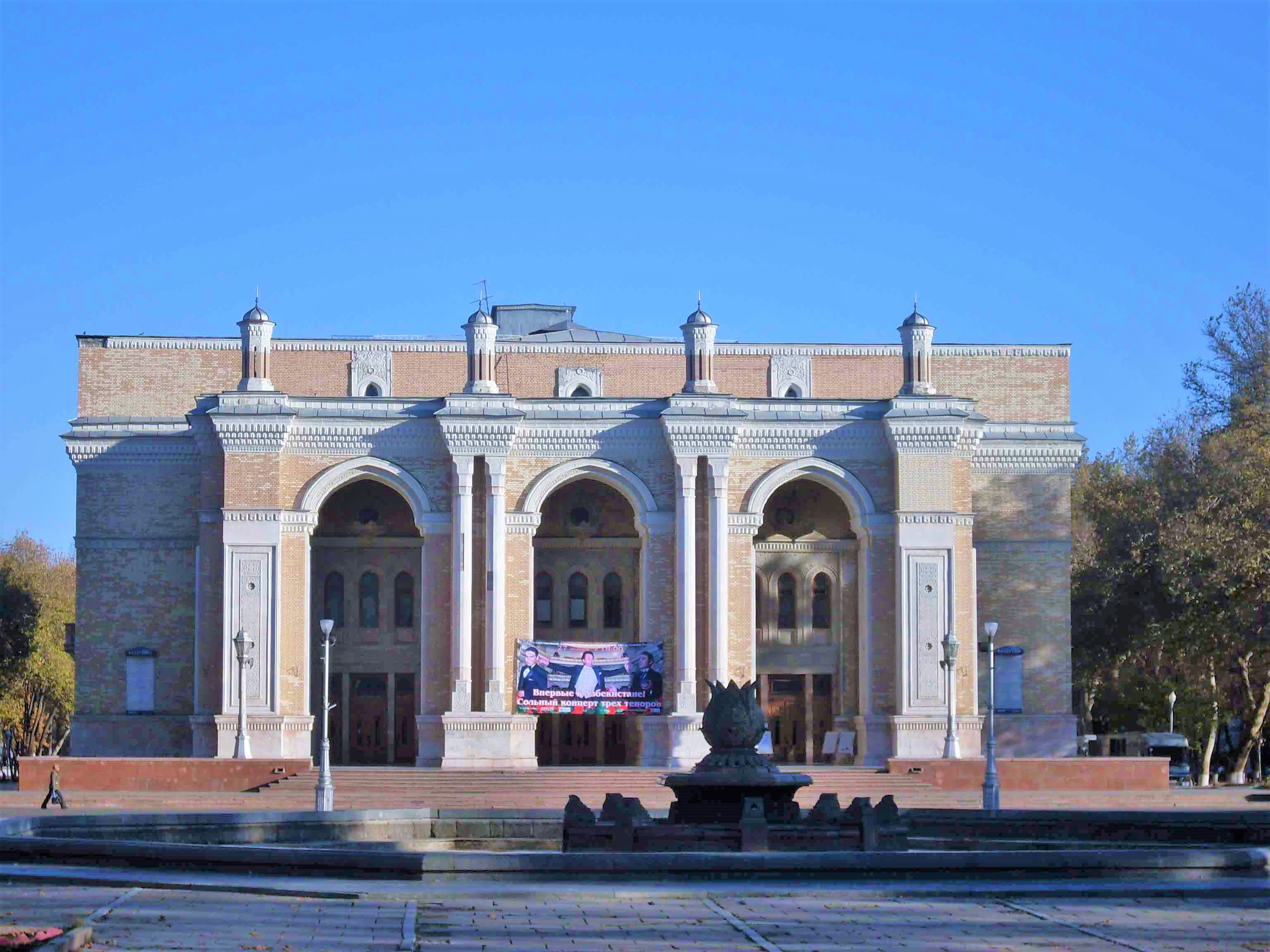
Navoi Opera Theater in Tashkent

Uzbekistan has a wide mix of ethnic groups and cultures, with the Uzbek being the majority group. In 1995 about 71% of Uzbekistan's population was Uzbek. The chief minority groups were Russians (8%), Tajiks (3–4.7%), Kazakhs (4%), Tatars (2.5%) and Karakalpaks (2%). It is said, however, that non-Uzbeks decline as Russians and other minority groups slowly leave and Uzbeks return from other parts of the former Soviet Union.

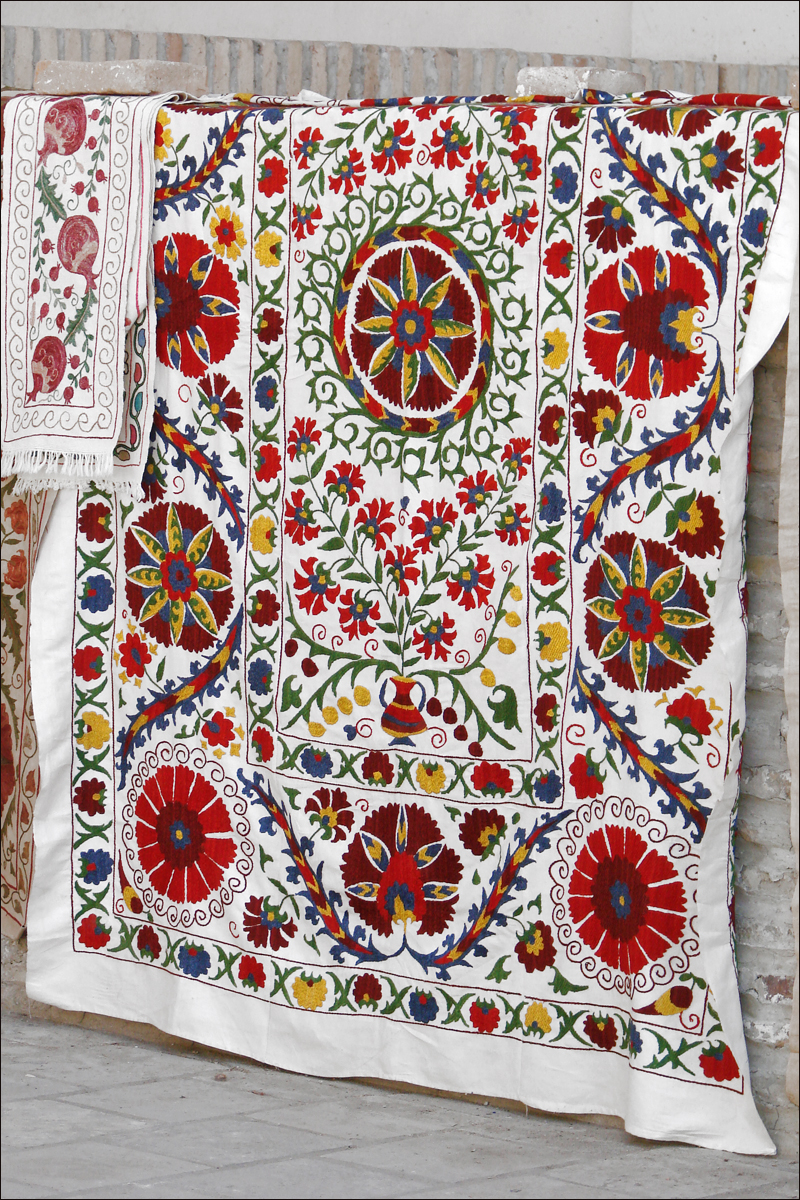
Embroidery from Uzbekistan

When Uzbekistan gained independence in 1991, there was concern that Muslim fundamentalism would spread across the region. The expectation was that a country long denied freedom of religious practice would undergo a very rapid increase in the expression of its dominant faith.

According to a 2009 Pew Research report, Uzbekistan's population is 96.3% Muslim; around 54% identifies as non-denominational Muslim, 18% as Sunni and 1% as Shia. Furthermore, 11% say they belong to a Sufi order.

=== Holidays ===
- 1 January: New Year's Day, "Yangi Yil Bayrami"
- 14 January: Day of Defenders of the Motherland, "Vatan Himoyachilari kuni"
- 8 March: International Women's Day, "Xalqaro Xotin-Qizlar kuni"
- 21 March: Nowruz, "Navroʻz Bayrami"
- 9 May: Day of Remembrance and Honour, "Xotira va Qadrlash kuni"
- 1 September: Independence Day, "Mustaqillik kuni"
- 1 October: Teachers' Day, "Oʻqituvchi va Murabbiylar kuni"
- 8 December: Constitution Day, "Konstitutsiya kuni"

Variable date

- End of Ramadan, Ramazon Hayiti (Eid al-Fitr)
- 70 days later, Qurbon Hayiti (Eid al-Adha)

=== Music ===
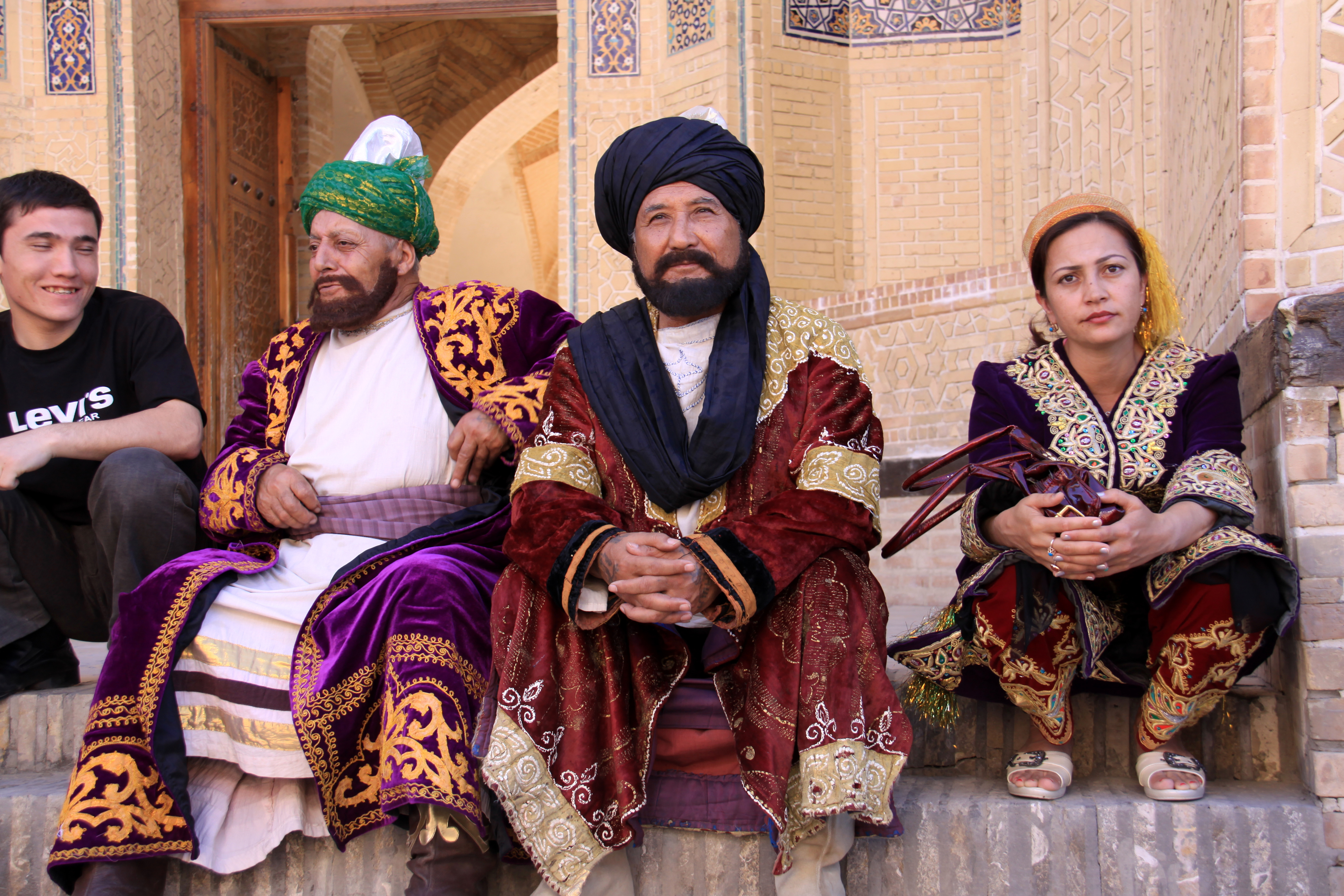
Silk and Spice Festival in Bukhara

Central Asian classical music is called Shashmaqam, which arose in Bukhara in the late 16th century when that city was a regional capital. Shashmaqam is closely related to Azerbaijani Mugam and Uyghur muqam. The name, which translates as six maqams, refers to the structure of the music, which contains six sections in six different Musical modes, similar to classical Persian traditional music. Interludes of spoken Sufi poetry interrupt the music, typically beginning at a lower register and gradually ascending to a climax before calming back down to the beginning tone.

=== Media ===
Mass media in Uzbekistan have undergone significant transformations since the country's independence in 1991. The government initially maintained strict control over all forms of media, with the state owning almost all print media and broadcasting outlets. However, since the early 2000s, there has been a gradual shift toward a more open media environment, although state influence remains strong.

The government controls major television channels, radio stations, and print publications, while the internet, though growing, faces censorship. Despite these constraints, the rise of independent media outlets and online platforms has slowly contributed to a diversification of information sources in the country. Nevertheless, journalists continue to face harassment, and self-censorship remains a significant issue in Uzbekistan's media landscape.

=== Cuisine ===
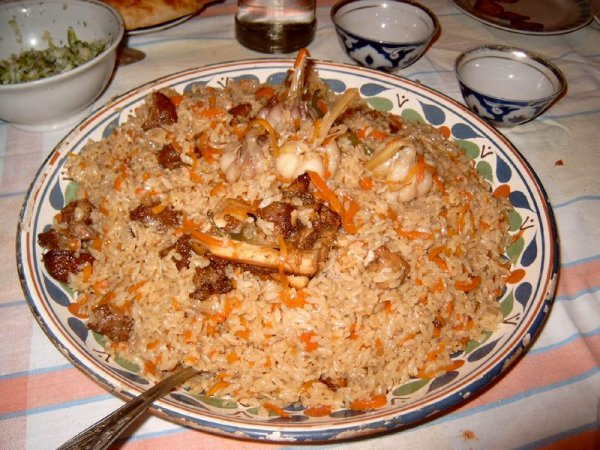
Palov

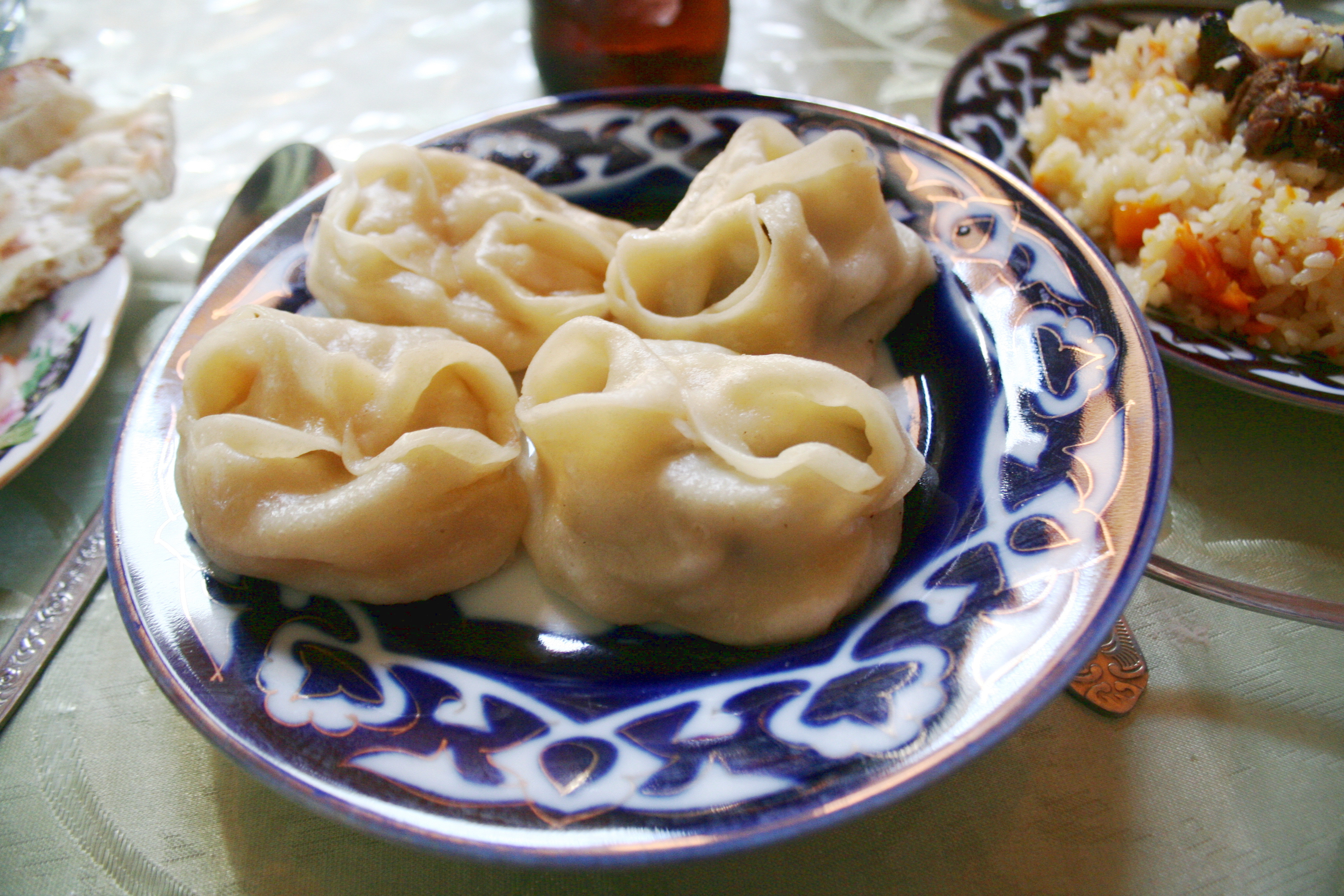
Uzbek manti

Uzbek cuisine is influenced by local agriculture; since there is a great deal of grain farming in Uzbekistan, bread and noodles are of importance and Uzbek cuisine has been characterised as "noodle-rich". Mutton is a popular variety of meat due to the abundance of sheep in the country and it is part of various Uzbek dishes.

Uzbekistan's signature dish is palov (or plov), a main course typically made with rice, meat, carrots, and onions, though it was not available to ordinary people until the 1930s. There are many regional variations of the dish. Often the fat found near the sheep tail, qurdiuq, is used. In the past, the cooking of palov was reserved for men, but the Soviets allowed women to cook it as well. Since then, it seems, the old gender roles have been restored.

Other notable national dishes include shurpa, a soup made of large pieces of fatty meat (usually mutton), and fresh vegetables; norin and laghman, noodle-based dishes that may be served as a soup or a main course; manti, chuchvara, and somsa, stuffed pockets of dough served as an appetiser or a main course; dimlama, a meat and vegetable stew; and various kebabs, usually served as a main course.

Green tea is the national hot beverage consumed throughout the day; teahouses (chaikhanas) are of cultural importance. Black tea is preferred in Tashkent, but both green and black teas are consumed daily, without milk or sugar. Tea always accompanies a meal, but it is also a drink of hospitality that is automatically offered: green or black to every guest. Ayran, a chilled yogurt drink, is popular in summer.

The use of alcohol is less widespread than in the West, but wine is comparatively popular for a Muslim nation as Uzbekistan is largely secular. Uzbekistan has 14 wineries, the oldest and most famous being the Khovrenko Winery in Samarkand (established in 1927). A number of vineyards in and around Tashkent are also growing in popularity, including Chateau Hamkor.

=== Sport ===
Before Uzbekistan's independence in 1991, the country was part of the Soviet Union's football, rugby union, basketball, ice hockey, and handball national teams. After independence, Uzbekistan created its own football, rugby union, basketball, and futsal national teams.

==== Football ====
Football is the most popular sport in Uzbekistan. Uzbekistan's premier football league is the Uzbek Super League, which has consisted of 16 teams since 2015. The current champions (2022) are FC Pakhtakor. Pakhtakor holds the record for the most Uzbekistan champion titles, having won the league ten times. Uzbekistan's football clubs regularly participate in the AFC Champions League and the AFC Cup. FC Nasaf Qarashi won the AFC Cup in 2011, the first international club cup for Uzbek football.

In 2025, Uzbek international footballer Abdukodir Khusanov, a centre-back, transferred from Lens to Manchester City on a four-and-a-half-year deal, becoming the first Uzbek player to compete in the Premier League.

==== Cycling ====
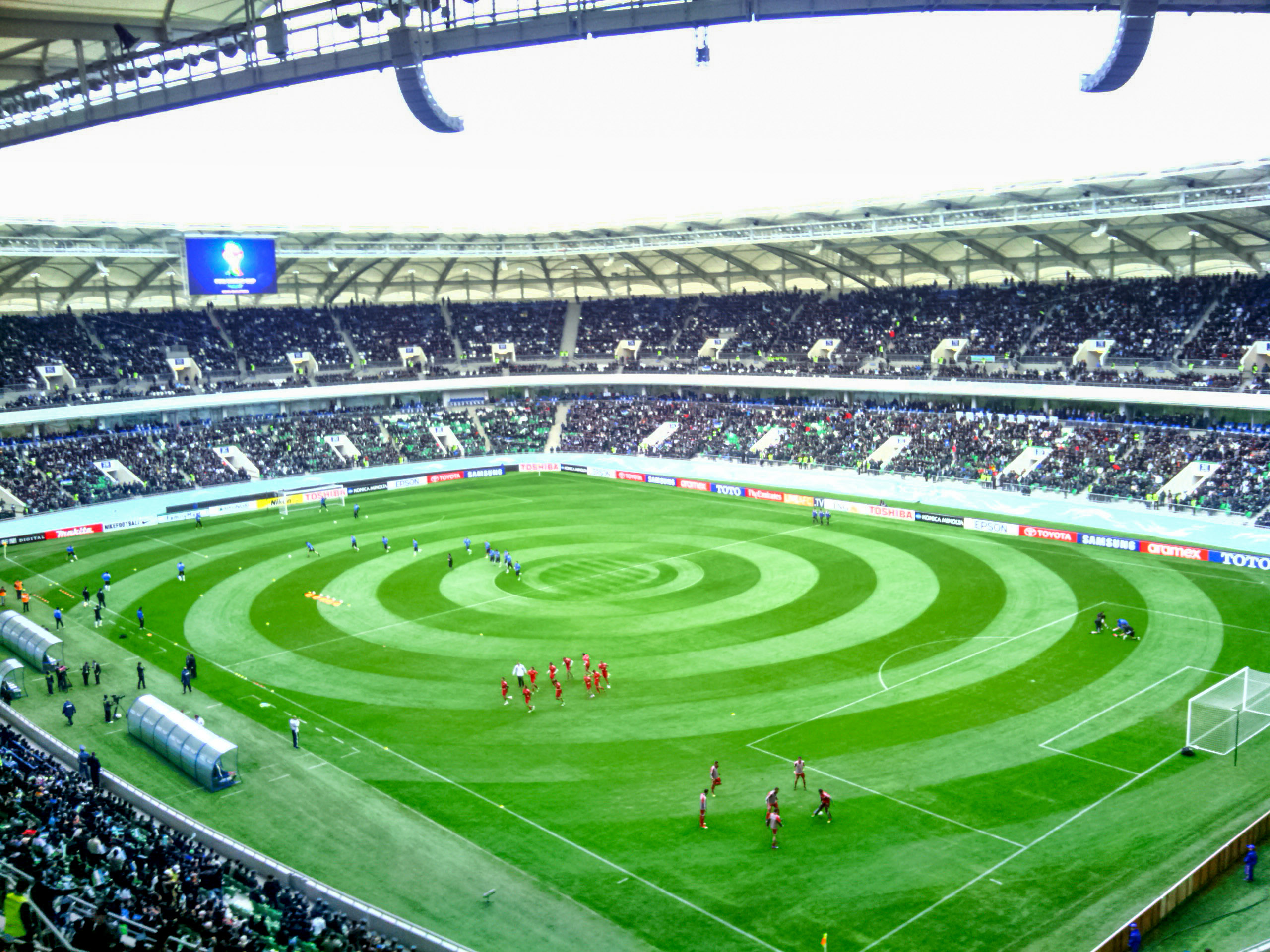
Milliy Stadium in Tashkent

Uzbekistan is home to former racing cyclist Djamolidine Abdoujaparov. Abdoujaparov won the green jersey points contest in the Tour de France three times. He was a specialist at winning stages in tours or one-day races when the bunch, or peloton, would finish together. He would often 'sprint' in the final kilometre and had a reputation for being dangerous in these bunch sprints, as he would weave from side to side. This reputation earned him the nickname 'The Terror of Tashkent'.

==== Wrestling ====
Artur Taymazov won Uzbekistan's inaugural wrestling medal at the 2000 Summer Olympics, followed by three Olympic gold medals in the Men's 120 kg category in 2004, 2008, and 2012. His 2008 gold was taken away in 2017 after a re-testing of samples from the Beijing Games, and Taymazov was later stripped of his London 2012 Olympic gold medal after re-analysis of stored samples in 2019. His London gold had made him the most successful freestyle competitor in Olympic history. He is the 60th athlete to be disqualified from the London Olympics after the event.

Uzbekistan is the home of the International Kurash Association. Kurash is an internationalised and modernised form of traditional Uzbek wrestling.

==== Boxing ====
Boxing is also one of the most popular sports in Uzbekistan. Uzbekistan has four Olympic champions, as well as winners of two silver and eight bronze medals at the Olympic Games in this sport. The country also has more medal winners in boxing at the Asian Games, the Asian Championships, and the World Championships. At the 2016 Summer Olympics, the Uzbekistan boxing team took first place in the medal standings in boxing, winning three gold, two silver, and two bronze medals. At the 2024 Summer Olympics, the Uzbekistan boxing team performed even better: five Uzbek boxers were awarded gold medals.

Ruslan Chagaev is a former professional boxer representing Uzbekistan in the WBA. He won the WBA champion title in 2007 after defeating Nikolai Valuev. Chagaev defended his title twice before losing it to Vladimir Klitschko in 2009. Another young talented boxer, Hasanboy Dusmatov, light flyweight champion at the 2016 Summer Olympics, won the Val Barker Trophy for the outstanding male boxer of Rio 2016 on 21 August 2016. On 21 December 2016, Dusmatov was honoured with the AIBA Boxer of the Year award at a 70-year anniversary event of the AIBA.

==== Ice hockey ====
Humo Tashkent, a professional ice hockey team, was established in 2019 with the aim of joining the Kontinental Hockey League (KHL). Humo joined the second-tier Supreme Hockey League (VHL) for the 2019–20 season. The team plays its home games at the Humo Ice Dome, which cost over €175 million to construct; both the team and the arena derive their name from the mythical Huma bird, a symbol of happiness and freedom. The Uzbekistan Hockey Federation (UHF) has begun preparations for forming a national ice hockey team and joining IIHF competitions.

==== Tennis ====
Tennis is a very popular sport in Uzbekistan, especially since the country gained independence in 1991. Uzbekistan has its own Tennis Federation, called the 'UTF' (Uzbekistan Tennis Federation), which was created in 2002. Uzbekistan also hosts an international WTA tennis tournament, the 'Tashkent Open', held in the capital city. This tournament has been held annually since 1999 and is played on outdoor hard courts. The most notable active players from Uzbekistan are Denis Istomin and Akgul Amanmuradova.

==== Chess ====
Chess is quite popular in Uzbekistan. The country boasts Rustam Kasimdzhanov, who was the FIDE World Chess Champion in 2004, and many junior players, such as the 2021 World Rapid Chess Champion Nodirbek Abdusattorov and the Chess World Cup 2025 winner Javokhir Sindarov. Uzbekistan won the gold medal at both the 44th Chess Olympiad in Chennai, India and at the 46th Chess Olympiad as the hosts in Samarkand with the Uzbek team consisting of GMs Nodirbek Abdusattorov, Nodirbek Yakubboev, Javokhir Sindarov, Shamsiddin Vokhidov in both tournaments, along with GM Jahongir Vakhidov in the 44th and GM Mukhiddin Madaminov in the 46th. GM Javokhir Sindarov also won the Candidates Tournament 2026 to qualify as the challenger for the World Chess Championship 2026 against the reigning champion GM Gukesh Dommaraju.

==== Other sports ====
Michael Kolganov, an Uzbek-born sprint canoer, was world champion and won an Olympic bronze medal in the K1 500-metre event in Sydney in 2000, representing Israel. In 2009 and 2011, another Uzbek émigré, gymnast Alexander Shatilov, won a world bronze medal as an artistic gymnast in the floor exercise, though he lives in and represents Israel in international competitions. Oksana Chusovitina has attended eight Olympic Games and won five world medals in artistic gymnastics, including an Olympic gold. Some of those medals were won while representing Germany and the Soviet Union, though she currently competes for Uzbekistan.

Other popular sports in Uzbekistan include basketball, judo, team handball, baseball, taekwondo, and futsal.

Ulugbek Rashitov won the country's first Olympic gold medal in taekwondo at the Summer Olympic Games in Tokyo in 2021.

In 2022, the World Judo Championships were held in Tashkent.

In 2024, the FIFA Futsal World Cup was held in Uzbekistan.

Since 2024, Tashkent hosts at least once a year a WTT Youth Contender, a table tennis tournament for youngsters promoted by a commercial arm from the International Table Tennis Federation - ITTF.

=== UNESCO World Heritage sites ===
Uzbekistan has six cultural and two natural sites on the UNESCO World Heritage list. The cultural sites are:

- Itchan Kala (Khiva), added in 1990
- Historic Centre of Bukhara, added in 1993
- Historic Centre of Shakhrisyabz, added in 2000
- Samarkand – Crossroads of Cultures, added in 2001
- Silk Roads: Zarafshan-Karakum Corridor, added in 2023
- Tashkent Modernist Architecture, added in 2026

The natural sites are:

- Western Tien-Shan, added in 2016
- Cold Winter Deserts of Turan, added in 2023

== See also ==
- Health in Uzbekistan
- Outline of Uzbekistan
- Uzbek language
