= Oriental Orthodoxy in Uzbekistan =

Oriental Orthodoxy in Uzbekistan refers to adherents of Oriental Orthodox Christianity in Uzbekistan. Since Uzbekistan has a predominant Muslim majority, Oriental Orthodox Christians and adherents of other Christian denominations in that country constitute a religious minority.

Oriental Orthodox Christians in Uzbekistan are mainly ethnic Armenians, who are adherents of Armenian Apostolic Church, one of the main churches of Oriental Orthodoxy. They number around 40,000, and most of them live in the capital city of Tashkent. The first Armenian Oriental Orthodox church was opened in 1905, in Samarqand. The modern-day Armenian community in Uzbekistan formed during the Armenian genocide when many Armenians, including their Oriental Orthodox clergy, fled through Azerbaijan to Uzbekistan, then ruled by the Russian Empire. After the formation of the Soviet Union, Armenians became big contributors to the social and political life of Uzbekistan. After the collapse of the Soviet Union, many Armenians moved to mainly to Russia, Armenia and the United States. Remaining Armenians in Uzbekistan keep their religious traditions. There are two active Armenian churches in Uzbekistan, in Samarkand and Tashkent. During the Soviet Union era, they were closed; in 1995 a businessman from Samarqand of Armenian origin, Artur Martirosyan, donated to re-construct and re-open the church.

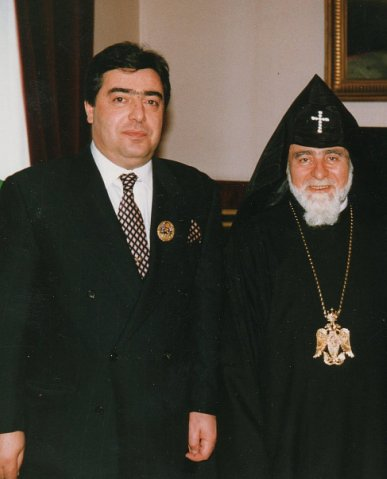
Catholicos of All Armenians Karekin I and Artur Martirosyan, who organized the restoration of the Oriental Orthodox church in Samarqand (1996)

== See also ==
- Religion in Uzbekistan
- Christianity in Uzbekistan
- Eastern Orthodoxy in Uzbekistan
- Roman Catholicism in Uzbekistan
- Protestantism in Uzbekistan
