= Eastern Orthodoxy in Uzbekistan =

Eastern Orthodoxy in Uzbekistan refers to adherents and religious communities of Eastern Orthodox Christianity in Uzbekistan. Uzbekistan has a Muslim majority, but some 5% of the population are Eastern Orthodox Christians, mainly ethnic Russians.

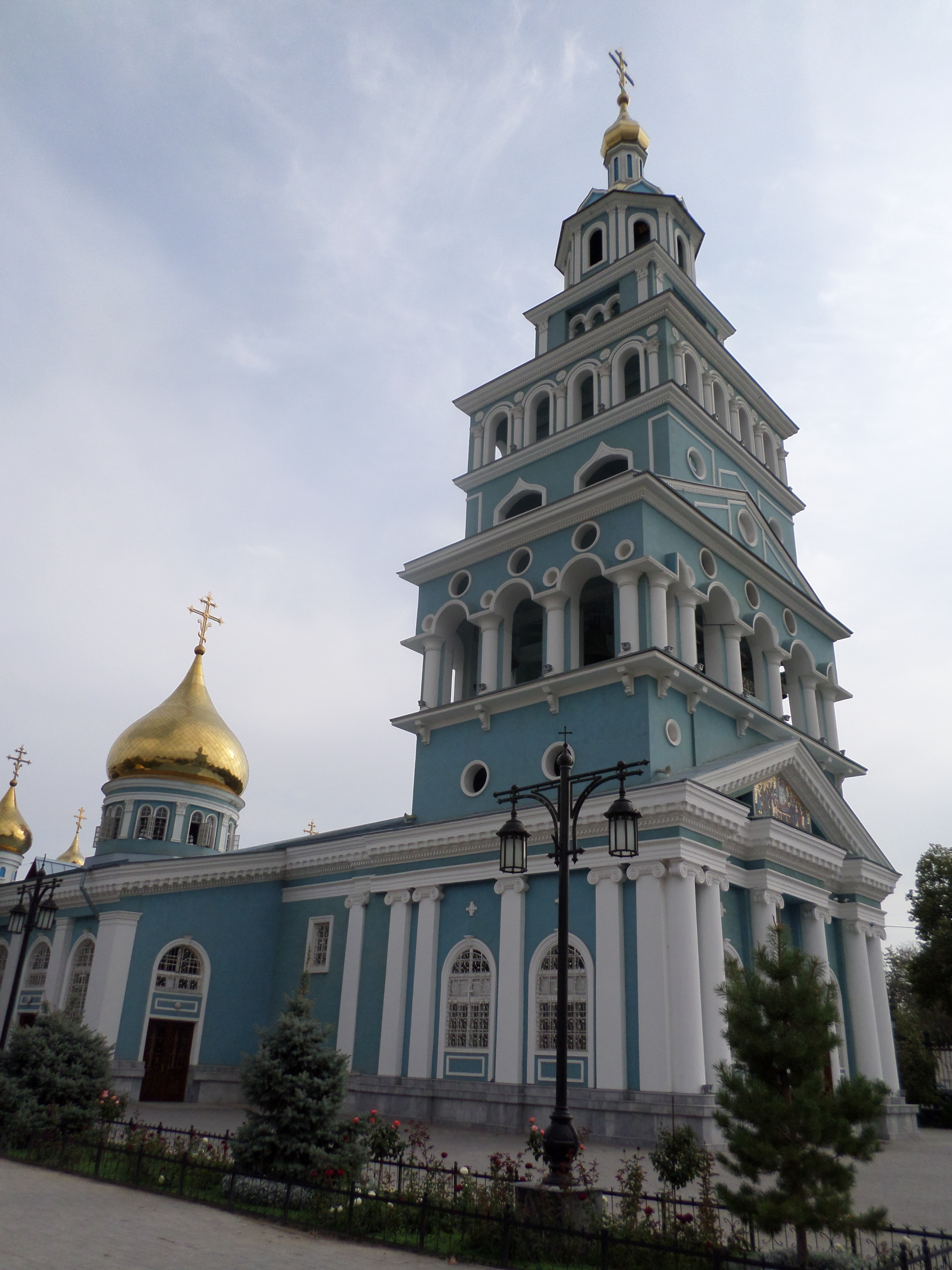
Russian Orthodox church in Tashkent

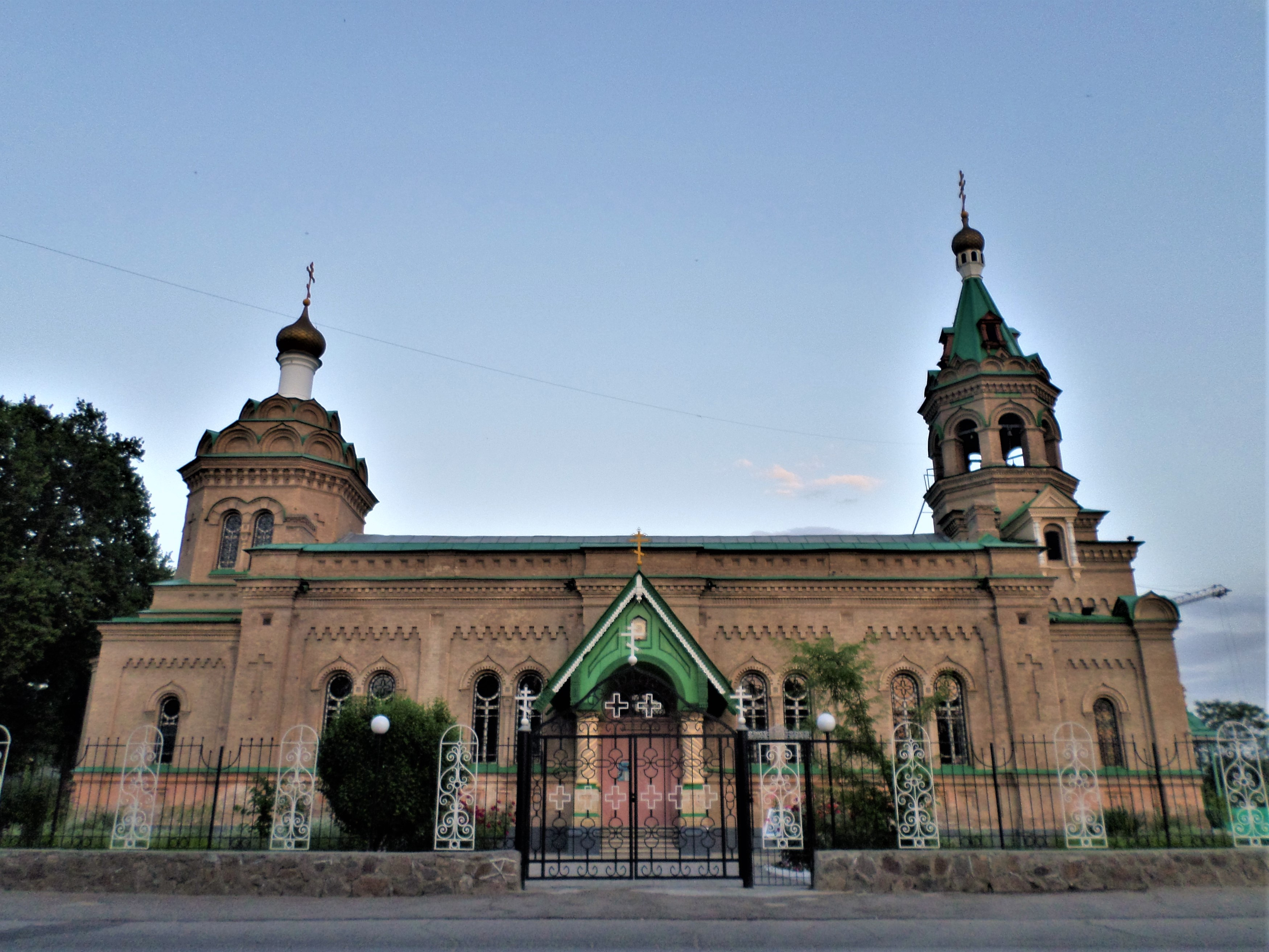
Russian Orthodox church in Samarkand

Russian Orthodox Church in Uzbekistan started to form during the 19th century, when entire region was ruled by the Russian Empire. First Eastern Orthodox ecclesiastical structures were formed before Russian Revolution (1917), but during the Soviet era religious life was mainly suppressed. Today, Russian Orthodox Church in Uzbekistan falls within the jurisdiction of Russian Orthodox Eparchy of Tashkent and Central Asia, which is headed by a Metropolitan. Since 2011, the current Metropolitan of Tashkent and Central Asia is Vincent (Morar). As of May 15, 2008, the Russian Orthodox Church in Uzbekistan is one of the officially registered Christian denominations in the country.

== See also ==
- Religion in Uzbekistan
- Christianity in Uzbekistan
- Russian Orthodox Church in Uzbekistan
- Cathedral of the Dormition of the Mother of God, Tashkent
- Oriental Orthodoxy in Uzbekistan
- Roman Catholicism in Uzbekistan
- Protestantism in Uzbekistan
