= Demographics of Uzbekistan =

- Population pyramid of Uzbekistan in 2023
- Population: 39,047,321 (January 15, 2026)
- Growth rate: 0.83% (2022 est.)
- Birth rate: 26.2 births/1,000 population (2022)
- Death rate: 4.8 deaths/1,000 population (2022)
- Life expectancy: 75.29 years
  - male: 72.27 years
  - female: 78.5 years
- Fertility rate: 3.4 children born/woman (2024)
- Infant mortality: 18.98 deaths/1,000 live births
- Net migration rate: −1.78 migrant(s)/1,000 population (2022 est.)
- Immigrant share: 3.2% (2024)

Age structure
- 0–14 years: 30.1%
- 65 and over: 5.3%

Sex ratio
- Total: 1.01 male(s)/female (2022 est.)
- At birth: 1.06 male(s)/female
- Under 15: 1.05 male(s)/female
- 65 and over: 0.63 male(s)/female

Nationality
- Nationality: Uzbekistani
- Major ethnic: Uzbek

Language
- Official: Uzbek
- Spoken: see languages of Uzbekistan

Demographic features of the population of Uzbekistan include population growth, population density, ethnicity, education level, health, economic status, religious affiliations, and other aspects of the population. The nationality of a person from Uzbekistan is Uzbekistani, while the ethnic Uzbek majority call themselves Uzbeks. Much of the data is estimated because the last census was carried out in Soviet times, in 1989. Uzbekistan conducted its first census since independence in February 2026.

== Overview ==
Uzbekistan is Central Asia's most populous country. Its 39 million people (as of January 2026) comprise nearly half the region's total population.

The population of Uzbekistan is very young: 30.1% of its people are younger than 14. According to official sources, Uzbeks comprise a majority (84.4%) of the total population. Other ethnic groups, as of 1996 estimates, include Russians (2.1% of the population), Tajiks (4.8%), Kazakhs (3%), Karakalpaks (2.5%), and Tatars (1.5%).

Uzbekistan has an ethnic Korean population that was forcibly relocated to the region from the Soviet Far East in 1937–1938. There are also small groups of Armenians in Uzbekistan, mostly in Tashkent and Samarkand. The nation is 94% Muslim (mostly Sunni), 3% Eastern Orthodox, and 3% other faiths (which include small communities of Korean Christians, other Christian denominations, Buddhists, Bahá'ís, and others). The Bukharan Jews have lived in Central Asia, mostly in Uzbekistan, for thousands of years. There were 94,900 Jews in Uzbekistan in 1989 (about 0.5% of the population according to the 1989 census), but since the collapse of the USSR, most Central Asian Jews have left the region for the United States or Israel. More than 5,000 Jews remain in Uzbekistan.

Much of Uzbekistan's population was engaged in cotton farming on large-scale collective farms when the country was part of the Soviet Union. The population continues to be heavily rural and dependent on farming for its livelihood, although the farm structure in Uzbekistan has largely shifted from collective to individual since 1990.

== Vital statistics ==
=== UN estimates ===
Period	Births per year	Deaths per year	Natural change per year	CBR^{1}	CDR^{1}	NC^{1}	TFR^{1}	IMR^{1}
1990–1995				32.7	7.5	25.2	3.95	
1995–2000				25.6	6.9	18.7	3.10	
2000–2005				21.3	6.4	14.9	2.51	
2005–2010				22.4	6.2	16.2	2.49	
2010–2015				22.9	6.2	16.7	2.43	
2015–2020				21.8	5.8	16.0	2.43	
2020–2025				18.6	5.9	12.7	2.31	
2025–2030				16.4	6.3	10.1	2.21	
2030–2035				15.7	6.9	8.8	2.12	
2035–2040				15.6	7.6	8.0	2.05	

Source: United Nations, Department of Economic and Social Affairs website > World Population Prospects: The 2019 revision.

=== Registered birth and deaths ===
	Average population (Dec. 31)	Live births	Deaths	Natural change	Crude birth rate (per 1000)	Crude death rate (per 1000)	Natural change (per 1000)	Crude migration rate (per 1000)	TFR
1950	6,314,000	192,188	54,612	137,576	30.4	8.6		21.8	
1951	6,511,000	207,302	49,275	158,027	31.8	7.6	24.3	6.9	
1952	6,704,000	223,452	55,068	168,384	33.3	8.2	25.1	4.5	
1953	6,909,000	219,832	60,855	158,977	31.8	8.8	23.0	7.6	
1954	7,085,000	237,470	58,345	179,125	33.5	8.2	25.3	0.2	
1955	7,256,000	248,545	59,370	189,175	34.3	8.2	26.1	−2.0	
1956	7,466,000	267,187	46,210	220,977	35.8	6.2	29.6	−0.7	
1957	7,720,000	276,668	47,568	229,100	35.8	6.2	29.7	4.3	
1958	7,979,000	300,646	48,433	252,213	37.7	6.1	31.6	1.9	
1959	8,252,000	305,082	50,254	254,828	37.0	6.1	30.9	3.3	
1960	8,558,000	340,618	51,758	288,860	39.8	6.0	33.8	3.3	
1961	8,895,000	339,952	53,591	286,361	38.2	6.0	32.2	7.2	
1962	9,237,000	341,352	56,178	285,174	37.0	6.1	30.9	7.5	
1963	9,574,000	342,659	54,502	288,157	35.8	5.7	30.1	6.4	
1964	9,905,000	346,847	53,315	293,532	35.0	5.4	29.6	5.0	
1965	10,233,000	355,135	60,056	295,079	34.7	5.9	28.8	4.3	
1966	10,557,000	360,336	60,115	300,221	34.1	5.7	28.4	3.3	
1967	10,886,000	359,623	64,627	294,996	33.0	5.9	27.1	4.1	
1968	11,259,000	385,687	64,762	320,925	34.3	5.8	28.5	5.8	
1969	11,625,000	380,729	69,147	311,582	32.8	6.0	26.8	5.7	
1970	11,973,000	401,613	66,189	335,424	33.6	5.5	28.1	1.8	
1971	12,354,000	425,646	67,162	358,484	34.4	5.4	29.0	2.8	
1972	12,756,000	421,458	77,942	343,516	33.0	6.1	26.9	5.6	
1973	13,155,000	441,237	83,170	358,067	33.5	6.3	27.2	4.1	
1974	13,569,000	462,062	86,864	375,198	34.1	6.4	27.7	3.8	
1975	13,981,000	478,604	100,213	378,391	34.2	7.2	27.0	3.4	
1976	14,389,000	503,514	101,544	401,970	35.0	7.1	27.9	1.3	
1977	14,786,000	493,329	104,297	389,032	33.4	7.1	26.3	1.3	
1978	15,184,000	514,030	105,204	408,826	33.9	6.9	27.0	−0.1	
1979	15,578,000	535,928	109,459	426,469	34.4	7.0	27.4	−1.5	
1980	15,952,000	540,047	118,886	421,161	33.9	7.5	26.4	−2.4	
1981	16,376,000	572,197	117,793	454,404	34.9	7.2	27.7	−1.1	
1982	16,813,000	589,283	124,137	465,146	35.0	7.4	27.7	−1.0	
1983	17,261,000	609,400	128,779	480,621	35.3	7.5	27.8	−1.2	
1984	17,716,000	641,398	132,042	509,356	36.2	7.5	28.8	−2.4	4.60
1985	18,174,000	679,057	131,686	547,371	37.4	7.2	30.1	−4.2	4.68
1986	18,634,000	708,658	132,213	576,445	38.0	7.1	30.9	−5.6	4.69
1987	19,095,000	714,454	133,781	580,673	37.4	7.0	30.4	−5.7	4.57
1988	19,561,000	694,144	134,688	559,456	35.5	6.9	28.6	−4.2	4.28
1989	20,108,000	668,807	126,862	541,945	33.3	6.3	27.0	1.0	4.02
1990	20,465,000	691,636	124,553	567,083	33.8	6.1	27.7	−9.9	4.20
1991	20,857,000	723,420	130,294	593,126	34.7	6.2	28.4	−9.2	
1992	21,354,000	680,459	140,092	540,367	31.9	6.6	25.3	−1.5	
1993	21,847,000	692,324	145,294	547,030	31.7	6.7	25.0	−1.9	
1994	22,277,000	657,725	148,423	509,302	29.5	6.7	22.9	−3.2	
1995	22,684,000	677,999	145,439	532,560	29.9	6.4	23.5	−5.2	3.60
1996	23,128,000	634,842	144,829	490,013	27.4	6.3	21.2	−1.6	
1997	23,560,000	602,694	137,331	465,363	25.6	5.8	19.8	−1.1	
1998	23,954,000	553,745	140,526	413,219	23.1	5.9	17.3	−0.6	
1999	24,312,000	544,788	130,529	414,259	22.4	5.4	17.0	−2.1	
2000	24,650,000	527,580	135,598	391,982	21.4	5.5	15.9	−2.0	2.59
2001	24,965,000	512,950	132,542	380,408	20.5	5.3	15.2	−2.4	
2002	25,272,000	532,511	137,028	395,483	21.1	5.4	15.6	−3.3	
2003	25,568,000	508,457	135,933	372,524	19.9	5.3	14.6	−2.9	
2004	25,864,000	540,381	130,357	410,024	20.9	5.0	15.9	−4.3	
2005	26,167,000	533,530	140,585	392,945	20.4	5.4	15.0	−3.3	2.36
2006	26,488,000	555,946	139,622	416,324	21.0	5.3	15.7	−3.4	
2007	26,868,000	608,917	137,430	471,487	22.7	5.1	17.5	−3.2	2.55
2008	27,303,000	646,096	138,792	507,304	23.7	5.1	18.6	−2.4	2.64
2009	27,767,000	649,727	130,659	519,068	23.4	4.7	18.7	−1.7	2.53
2010	28,562,000	634,810	138,411	496,399	21.6	4.7	16.9	11.2	2.27
2011	29,339,000	626,881	144,585	482,296	20.8	4.8	16.0	10.8	2.18
2012	29,774,000	625,106	145,988	479,118	20.6	4.8	15.8	−1.3	2.14
2013	30,243,000	679,519	145,672	533,847	22.0	4.7	17.3	−1.9	2.30
2014	30,759,000	718,036	149,761	568,998	22.9	4.8	18.1	−1.3	2.41
2015	31,576,000	734,141	152,035	582,106	23.0	4.8	18.2	8.0	2.45
2016	32,121,000	726,170	154,791	571,379	22.3	4.8	17.5	−0.7	2.42
2017	32,653,000	715,519	160,723	554,796	21.6	4.9	16.7	−0.5	2.40
2018	33,254,000	768,520	154,913	613,607	22.9	4.6	18.3	−0.2	2.60
2019	33,905,000	815,939	154,959	660,980	23.8	4.5	19.3	−0.1	2.79
2020	34,558,900	841,814	175,637	666,177	24.1	5.0	19.1	−0.2	2.93
2021	35,271,300	905,211	174,541	730,670	25.4	4.9	20.5	−0.3	3.20
2022	36,024,900	932,192	172,075	760,117	25.6	4.7	20.9	0	3.33
2023	36,799,800	961,962	172,772	789,190	25.9	4.6	21.3	−0.4	3.46
2024	37,543,200	926,422	174,413	752,009	24.4	4.6	19.8	−0.2	3.36
2025	38,236,700	879,599	177,104	702,495	22.7	4.6	18.1	−0.2	3.21
2026	39,047,321	845,200(e)							

View source data.
View source data.
View source data.

==== Current vital statistics ====
Period	Live births	Deaths	Natural increase
January—September 2025	664,598	132,197	+532,401
January—September 2026	638,628	123,366	+515,262
Difference	▼ –25,970 (-3.91%)	▼ –8,831 (-6.68%)	▼ –17,139

=== Demographic and Health Surveys ===
Total fertility rate (TFR) and crude birth rate (CBR):

Year	Total		Urban		Rural	
Year	CBR	TFR	CBR	TFR	CBR	TFR
1996	27	3.34 (3.1)	23	2.71 (2.5)	29	3.74 (3.4)
2002	24.4	2.92	19.8	2.48	27.5	3.21

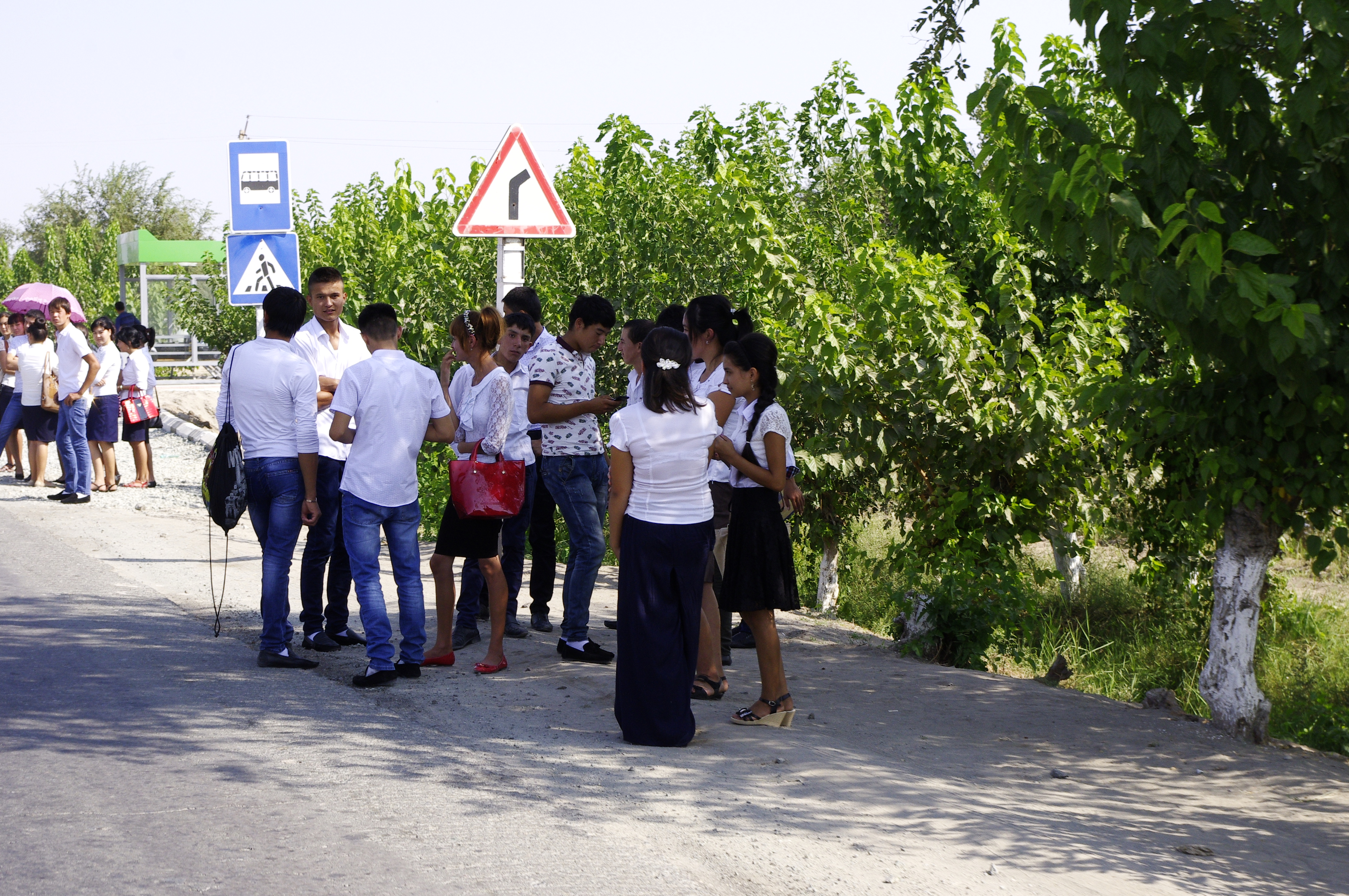
Uzbek youth

In 2002, the estimated TFR was 2.92; Uzbeks 2.99, Russians 1.35, Karakalpak 2.69, Tajik 3.19, Kazakh 2.95, Tatar 2.05, others 2.53; Tashkent City 1.96, Karakalpakstan 2.90, Fergana 2.73; Eastern region 2.71, East Central 2.96, Central 3.43, Western 3.05.

Years	1925	1926	1927	1928	1929	1930	1931	1932	1933	1934
Total Fertility Rate in Uzbekistan	5.71	5.71	5.71	5.71	5.71	5.71	5.71	5.71	5.71	5.71

Years	1935	1936	1937	1938	1939	1940	1941	1942	1943	1944
Total Fertility Rate in Uzbekistan	5.71	5.71	5.71	5.71	5.71	5.71	5.71	5.71	5.71	5.71

Years	1945	1946	1947	1948	1949
Total Fertility Rate in Uzbekistan	5.71	5.71	5.71	5.71	5.71

The high fertility rate during the Soviet Union and during its period of disintegration is partly due to the historical cultural preferences for large families, economic reliance upon agriculture, and the greater relative worth of Soviet child benefits in Uzbekistan. Abortion was the preferred method of birth control. Legalized in 1955, the number of abortions increased by 231% from 1956 to 1973. By 1991, the abortion ratio was 39 abortions per 1,000 women of reproductive age per year.

However, in the past few decades, fertility control methods have shifted considerably from abortion to modern contraceptive methods, especially IUDs. By the mid-1980s IUDS became the main method of contraception through government and organizational policies that aimed to introduce women to modern contraceptives. According to a UHES report from 2002, 73% of married Uzbek woman had used the IUD, 14% male condom, and 13% the pill.

The government supported the use of modern contraceptives to control fertility rates because of national economic difficulties that followed the disintegration of the Soviet Union. Thus the government has been influential in determining the popularity of the IUD. Despite family planning programs that educate women on different methods of contraception, the IUD has remained women's first choice of contraception. Word of mouth and social relations also account for the strong preference for the IUD. Nevertheless, factors such as class and level of education have been shown to give women more freedom in their choice of contraception methods.

The late President Islam Karimov had repressive birth control measures as part of state policy, including allegations of forced sterilization, which were loosened after his death in 2016 and which accounts for a baby boom that had started in 2018.

=== Regional differences ===
As of 2025, the regions of Surxondaryo and Qashqadaryo have the highest birth rate in Uzbekistan. On the other hand, the Republic of Karakalpakstan and Toshkent have the lowest birth rate in the country. The highest death rate is in the city of Toshkent, while the lowest in the region of Jizzax.

Vital statistics by regions of the Republic of Uzbekistan
Division	Birth rate (‰)	Death rate (‰)	Natural growth rate (‰)	Total fertility rate
Surxondaryo Region	27.8	4.4	+23.4	3.83
Qashqadaryo Region	27.3	4.3	+23.0	3.76
Jizzax Region	24.8	4.5	+20.3	3.34
Samarqand Region	24.4	4.5	+19.9	3.43
Namangan Region	24.3	4.6	+19.7	3.5
Andijon Region	22.8	4.8	+18.0	3.34
Navoiy Region	20.5	4.1	+16.4	2.98
Xorazm Region	21.7	4.5	+17.2	2.99
Fergana Region	23.4	4.5	+18.9	3.41
Republic of Karakalpakstan	18.4	4.9	+13.5	2.57
Sirdaryo Region	22.2	4.9	+17.3	3.05
Buxoro Region	20.9	4.2	+16.7	2.97
Toshkent Region	17.2	4.6	+12.6	2.43
Toshkent	19.5	5.3	+14.2	2.75
Republic of Uzbekistan	22.7	4.6	+18.1	3.21

=== Infant mortality rate ===
2020 estimate:

Total: 17 deaths per 1,000 live births
Male: 19 deaths per 1,000 live births
Female: 15 deaths per 1,000 live births

=== Life expectancy ===
Life expectancy in Uzbekistan since 1950

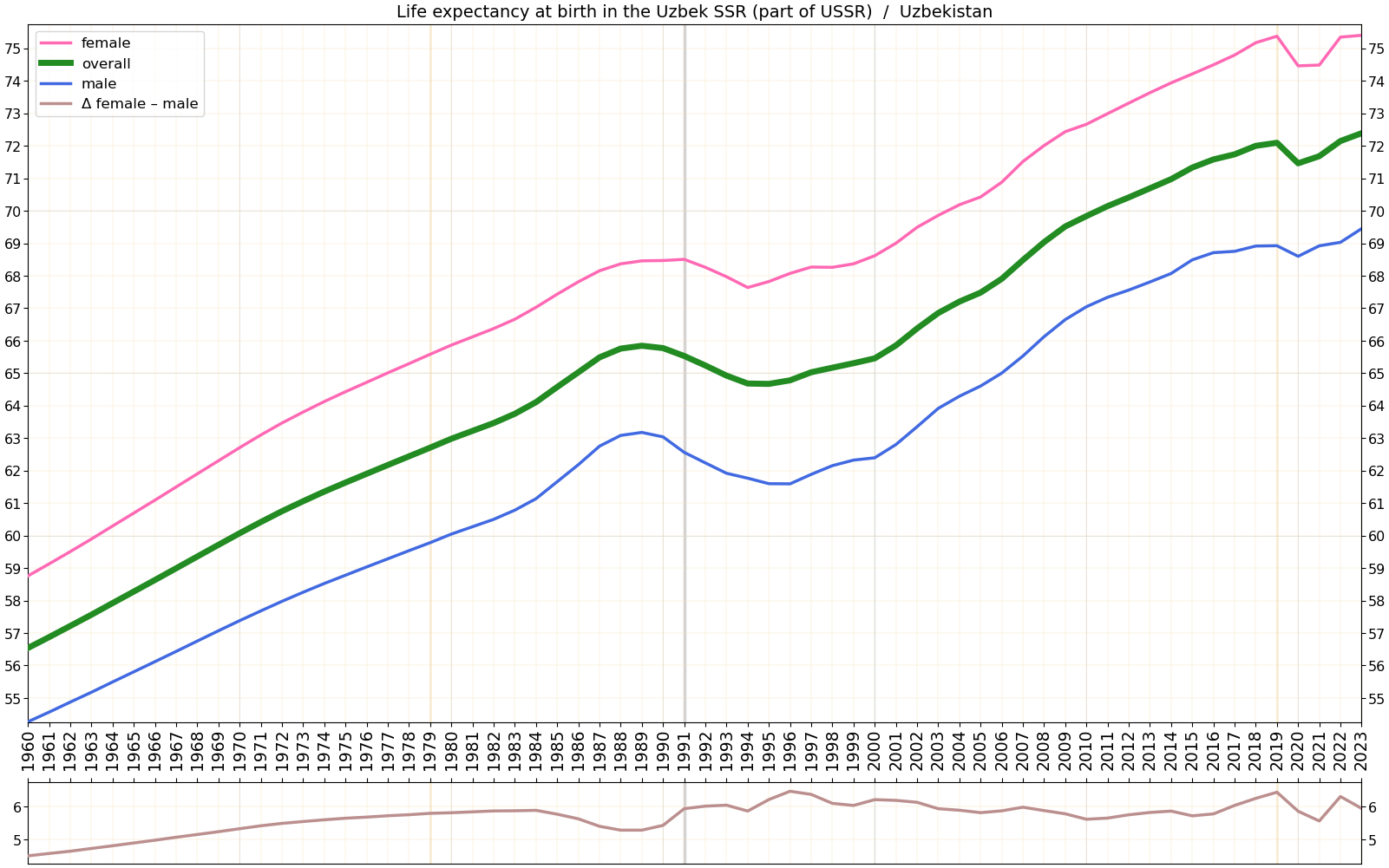
Life expectancy in Uzbekistan since 1960 by gender

Period	Life expectancy in Years	Period	Life expectancy in Years
1950–1955	56.1	1985–1990	66.6
1955–1960	57.9	1990–1995	66.3
1960–1965	59.8	1995–2000	66.7
1965–1970	61.6	2000–2005	67.7
1970–1975	63.0	2005–2010	69.1
1975–1980	64.0	2010–2015	70.8
1980–1985	65.3	2015–2020	75.2

Source: UN World Population Prospects 2017

== Ethnic groups ==
Ethnic composition according to the 1989 population census (latest available):
Uzbek 71%, Russian 6%, Tajik 5% (believed to be much higher), Kazakh 4%, Tatar 3%, Karakalpak 2%, other 7%.

Estimates of ethnic composition in 1996 from CIA World Factbook:

Uzbek 80%, Russian 5.5%, Tajik 5%, Kazakh 3%, Karakalpak 2.5%, Tatar 1.5%, other 2.5% (1996 est.)

The table shows the ethnic composition of Uzbekistan's population (in percent) according to four population censuses between 1926 and 1989 (no population census was carried out in 1999, and the next census is now being planned for 2010). The increase in the percentage of Tajik from 3.9% of the population in 1979 to 4.7% in 1989 may be attributed, at least in part, to the change in census instructions: in the 1989 census for the first the nationality could be reported not according to the passport, but freely self-declared on the basis of the respondent's ethnic self-identification.

Population of Uzbekistan by ethnic groups 1926–2026
Ethnic group	census 1926^{1}		census 1939^{2}		census 1959^{3}		census 1970^{4}		census 1979^{5}		census 1989^{6}		estimates 2017^{7}		census 2026^{8}	
Ethnic group	Number	%	Number	%	Number	%	Number	%	Number	%	Number	%	Number	%	Number	%
Uzbeks	3,467,226	73.0	4,804,096	65.1	5,038,273	62.2	7,733,541	64.7	10,569,007	68.7	14,142,475	71.4	26,917,700	83.8	34,901,261	89.4
Tajiks	350,670	7.4	317,560	5.1	311,375	3.8	457,356	3.8	594,627	3.9	933,560	4.7	1,544,700	4.8	1,276,941	3.3
Kazakhs	191,126	4.0	305,416	4.9	335,267	4.1	549,312	4.6	620,136	4.0	808,227	4.1	803,400	2.5	707,329	1.8
Karakalpaks	142,688	3.0	181,420	2.9	168,274	2.1	230,273	1.9	297,788	1.9	411,878	2.1	708,800	2.2	841,397	2.2
Russians	245,807	5.2	727,331	11.6	1,090,728	13.5	1,495,556	12.5	1,665,658	10.8	1,653,478	8.4	750,000	2.3	606,526	1.6
Kyrgyz	79,610	1.7	89,044	1.4	92,725	1.1	110,864	1.0	142,182	0.7	174,907	0.8	274,400	0.9	219,091	0.6
Turkmens	31,492	0.7	46,543	0.7	54,804	0.7	71,066	0.6	92,285	0.6	121,578	0.6	192,000	0.6	194,757	0.5
Tatars	28,335	0.6	147,157	2.3	397,981	4.9	442,331	3.7	531,205	3.5	467,829	2.4	195,000	0.6		
Koreans	30	0.0	72,944	1.2	138,453	1.7	151,058	1.3	163,062	1.1	183,140	0.9	176,900	0.6		
Ukrainians	25,335	0.5	70,577	1.1	87,927	1.1	114,979	1.0	113,826	0.7	153,197	0.8	70,700	0.2		
Crimean Tatars					46,829	0.6	135,426	1.1	117,559	0.8	188,772	1.0				
Turks	371	0.0	474	0.0	21,269	0.3	46,398	0.4	48,726	0.3	106,302	0.5				
Jews	37,621	0.8	50,676	0.8	94,303	1.2	102,843	0.9	99,836	0.7	94,689	0.5				
Armenians	14,862	0.3	20,394	0.3	27,370	0.3	34,470	0.3	42,374	0.3	50,537	0.3				
Azerbaijanis	20,764	0.4	3,645	0.1	40,511	0.5	40,431	0.3	59,779	0.4	44,410	0.2				
Uyghurs	36,349	0.8	50,638	0.8	19,377	0.2	24,039	0.2	29,104	0.2	35,762	0.2				
Bashkirs	624	0.0	7,516	0.1	13,500	0.2	21,069	0.2	25,879	0.2	34,771	0.2				
Others	77,889	1.6	98,838	1.6	126,738	1.6	198,570	1.7	176,274	1.1	204,565	1.0	486,900	1.5	300,019	0.8
Total	4,750,175		6,271,269		8,105,704		11,959,582		15,389,307		19,810,077		32,120,500		39,047,321	
^{1} Excluding the Tadzjik ASSR, but including the Kara-Kalpak Autonomous Oblast (in 1926 part of the Kazakh ASSR); source:. ^{2} Source:. ^{3} Source:. ^{4} Source:. ^{5} Source:. ^{6} Source:. ^{7} Source:. ^{8} Source:.

== Languages ==
Population by Mother Tongue (2026 Census)
Language	percent
Uzbek	91.3%
Karakalpak	2.3%
Tajik	2.2%
Russian	2.0%
Kazakh	1.4%
others	0.7%

According to the CIA world factbook, the language distribution was Uzbek 82%, Russian 9%, Tajik 5% and Other 4%. The Latin script replaced Cyrillic in the mid-1990s. Following independence, Uzbek was made the official state language. President Islam Karimov, the radical nationalist group Birlik (Unity), and the Uzbek Popular Front promoted this change. These parties believed that Uzbek would stimulate nationalism and the change itself was part of the process of derussification, which was meant to deprive Russian language and culture of any recognition. Birlik held campaigns in the late 1980s to achieve this goal, with one event in 1989 culminating in 12,000 people in Tashkent calling for official recognition of Uzbek as the state language. In 1995, the government adopted the Law of the Republic of Uzbekistan on State Language, which mandates that Uzbek be used in all public spheres and official jobs. Scholars studying migration and ethnic minorities have since criticized the law as a source of discrimination toward minorities who do not speak Uzbek. Nevertheless, Russian remains the de facto language when it comes to science, inter-ethnic communication, business, and advertising. Multiple sources suggest that the Persian-speaking Tajik population of Uzbekistan may be as large as 10–15% of the total population. The Tajik language is the dominant language spoken in the cities of Bukhara and Samarkand. The delineation of territory in 1924 and the process of "Uzbekisation" caused many Tajiks to identify as Uzbek. Thus there are many Tajiks who speak Tajik but are officially documented as Uzbek.

== Religion ==
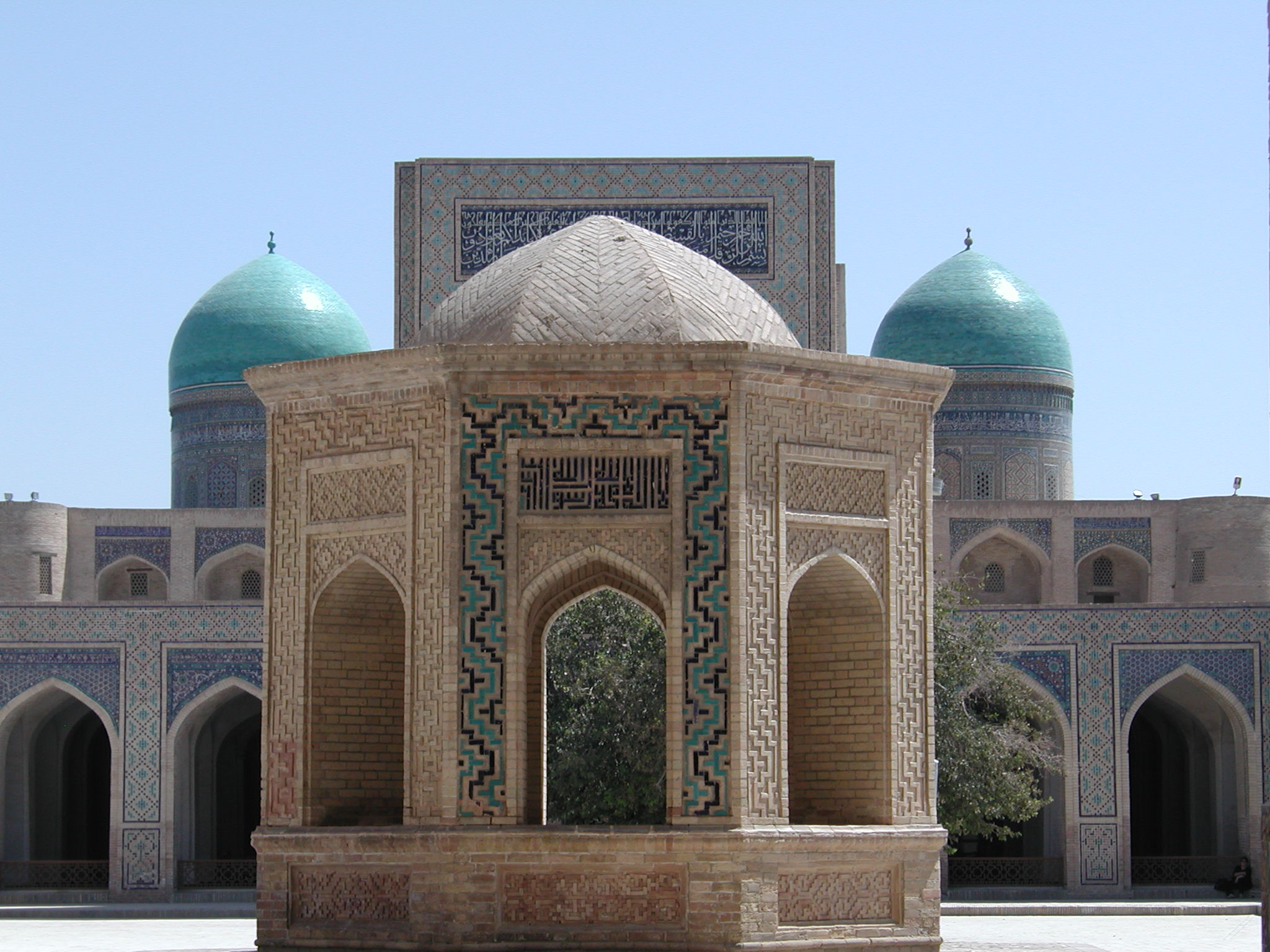
Mosque in Bukhara

Religions of Uzbekistan (2020 )
Religions	percent
Islam	94%
Eastern Orthodox	3%
others	3%

Muslims constitute 94% of the population according to a 2013 US State Department release. Approximately 3% of the population are Russian Orthodox Christians.

There were 94,900 Jews in Uzbekistan in 1989 (about 0.5% of the population according to the 1989 census), but fewer than 5,000 remained in 2007.

A study showed that 35% of those surveyed consider religion as "very important".

== Migration ==
As of 2011, Uzbekistan has a net migration rate of −2.74 migrant(s)/ 1,000 population.

The process of migration changed after the fall of the Soviet Union. During the Soviet Union, passports facilitated movement throughout the fifteen republics and movement throughout the republics was relatively less expensive than it is today. An application for a labor abroad permit from a special department of the Uzbek Agency of External Labor Migration in Uzbekistan is required since 2003. The permit was originally not affordable to many Uzbeks and the process was criticized for the bureaucratic red tape it required. The same departments and agencies involved in creating this permit are consequently working to substantially reduce the costs as well as simplifying the procedure. On July 4, 2007, the Russian First Deputy Prime Minister Sergey Ivanov signed three agreements that would address labor activity and protection of the rights of the working migrants (this includes Russian citizens in Uzbekistan and Uzbek citizens in Russia) as well as cooperation in fighting undocumented immigration and the deportation of undocumented workers.

=== Uzbek migration ===
Economic difficulties have increased labor migration to Russia, the United Arab Emirates (UAE), Turkey, South Korea, and Europe over the past decade. At least 10% of Uzbekistan's labor force works abroad. Approximately 58% of the labor force that migrates, migrates to Russia. High unemployment rates and low wages are responsible for labor migration.

Migrants typically are people from the village, farmers, blue-collar workers, and students who are seeking work abroad. However, many migrants are not aware of the legal procedures required to leave the country, causing many to end up unregistered in Uzbekistan or the host country. Without proper registration, undocumented migrants are susceptible to underpayment, no social guarantees and bad treatment by employers. According to data from the Russian Federal Immigration Service, there were 102,658 officially registered labor migrants versus 1.5 million unregistered immigrants from Uzbekistan in Russia in 2006. The total remittances for both groups combined was approximately US$1.3 billion that same year, eight percent of Uzbekistan's GDP.

=== Minorities ===
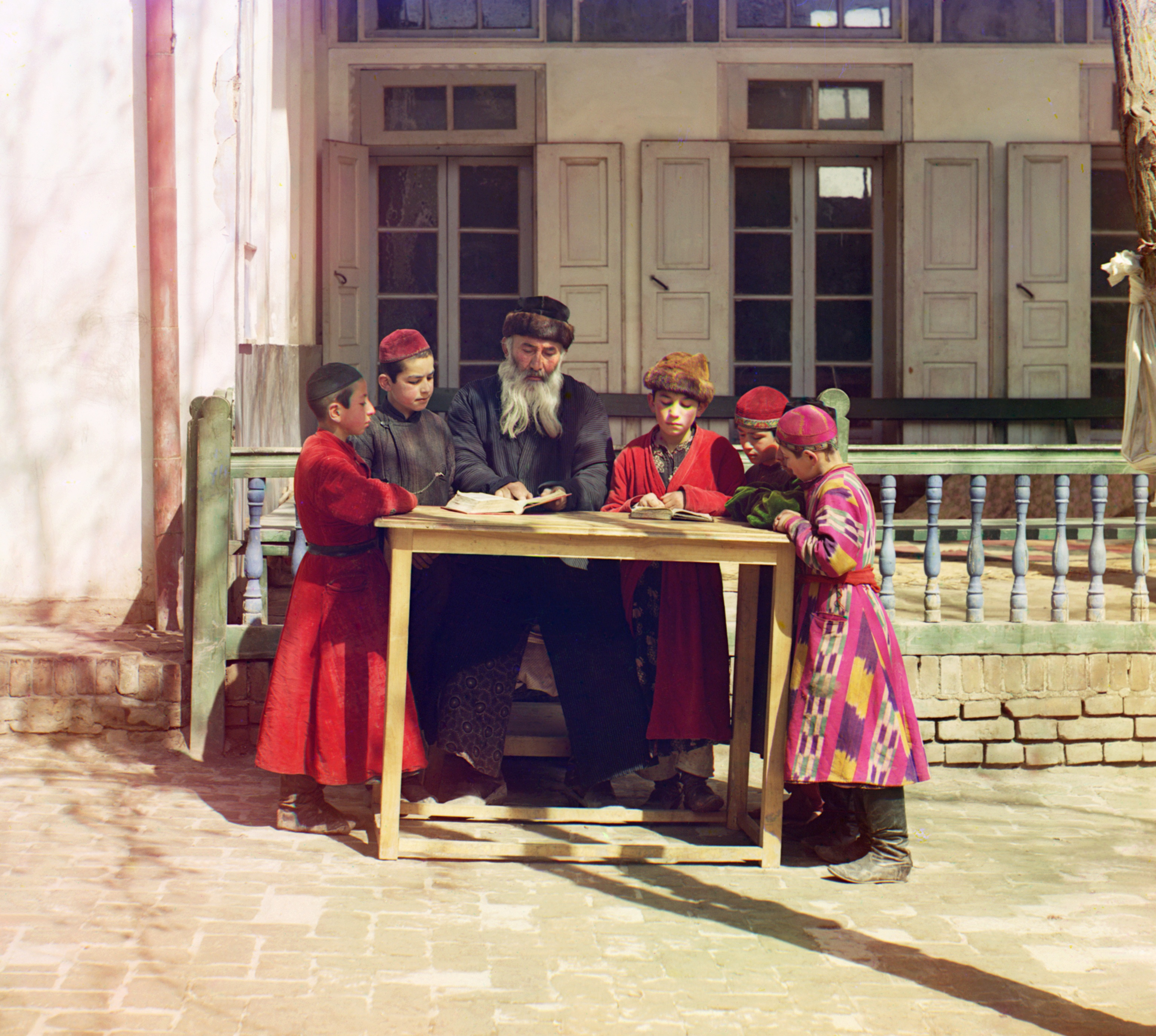
Jewish children with their teacher in Samarkand. Early color photograph from Russia, created by Sergei Mikhailovich Prokudin-Gorskii as part of his work to document the Russian Empire from 1909 to 1915.

A significant number of ethnic and national minorities left Uzbekistan after the country became independent, but actual numbers are unknown. The primary reasons for migration by minorities include: few economic opportunities, a low standard of living, and a poor prospect for educational opportunities for future generations. Although Uzbekistan's language law has been cited as a source of discrimination toward those who do not speak Uzbek, this law has intertwined with social, economic, and political factors that have led to migration as a solution to a lack of opportunities in Uzbekistan.

Russians, who constituted a primarily urban population made up half of the population of Tashkent, the capital of Uzbekistan, until the 1980s. Since then, the population has been gradually diminishing as many Russians have migrated to Russia. Nevertheless, Russian registration permits (propiska) constrain migration. The decision to migrate is complicated by the fact that many Russians or other minority groups who have a "homeland" may view Uzbekistan as the "motherland". It is also complicated by the fact that these groups might not speak the national language of their "homeland" or may be registered under another nationality on their passports. Nonetheless, "native" embassies facilitate this migration. Approximately 200 visas are given out to Jews from the Israel embassy weekly.

== See also ==
- Demographics of Central Asia
- Uzbekistan
- Outline of Uzbekistan
- Tajiks in Uzbekistan
