= Cathedral of the Assumption of the Virgin, Tashkent =

Coordinates: 41.2908°N 69.2788°E

Cathedral of the Dormition of the Mother of God
- Успенский кафедральный собор
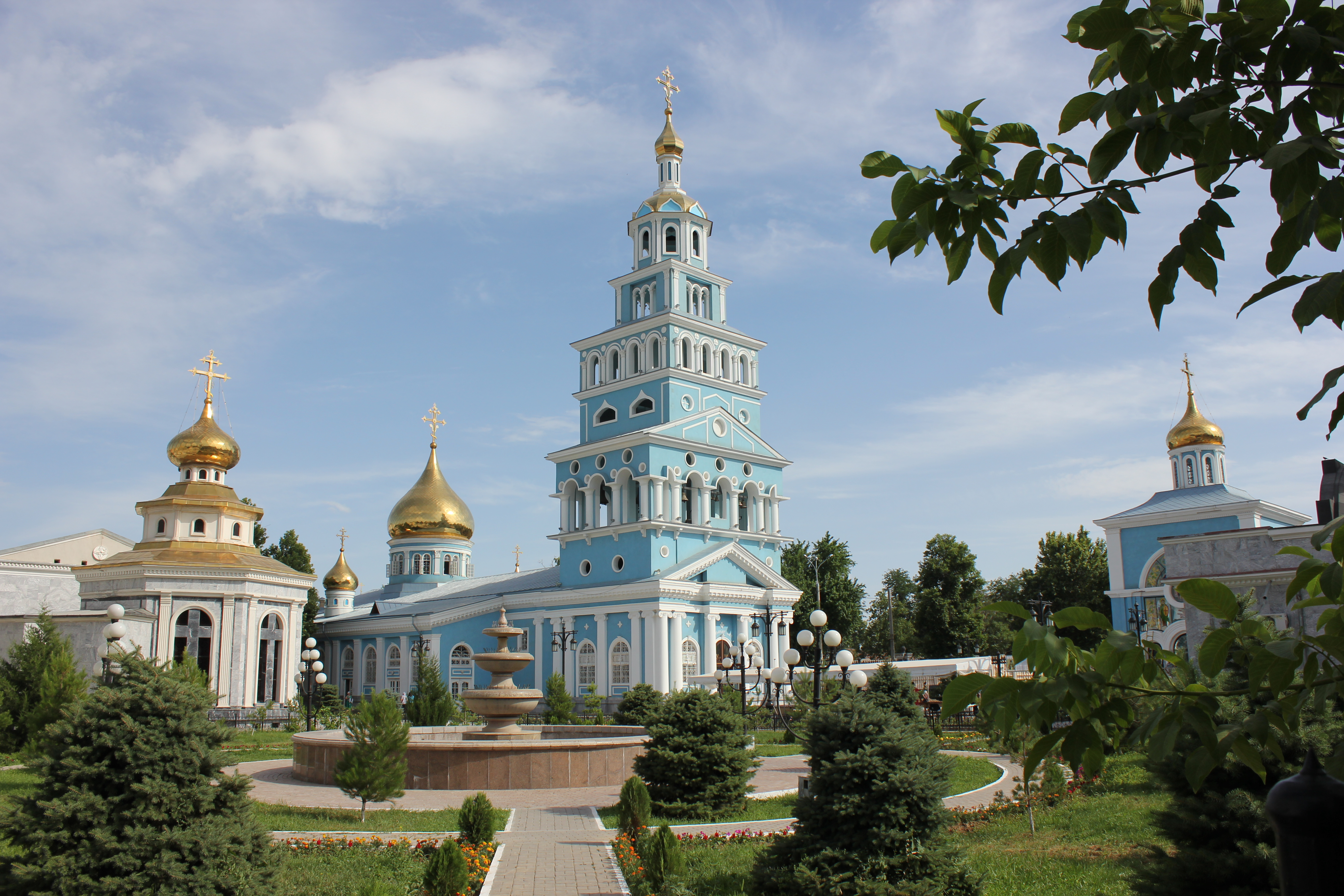
- The Cathedral of the Dormition of the Mother of God, Tashkent
- Cathedral of the Dormition of the Mother of God
- Location: Tashkent
- Country: Uzbekistan
- Denomination: Russian Orthodox Church

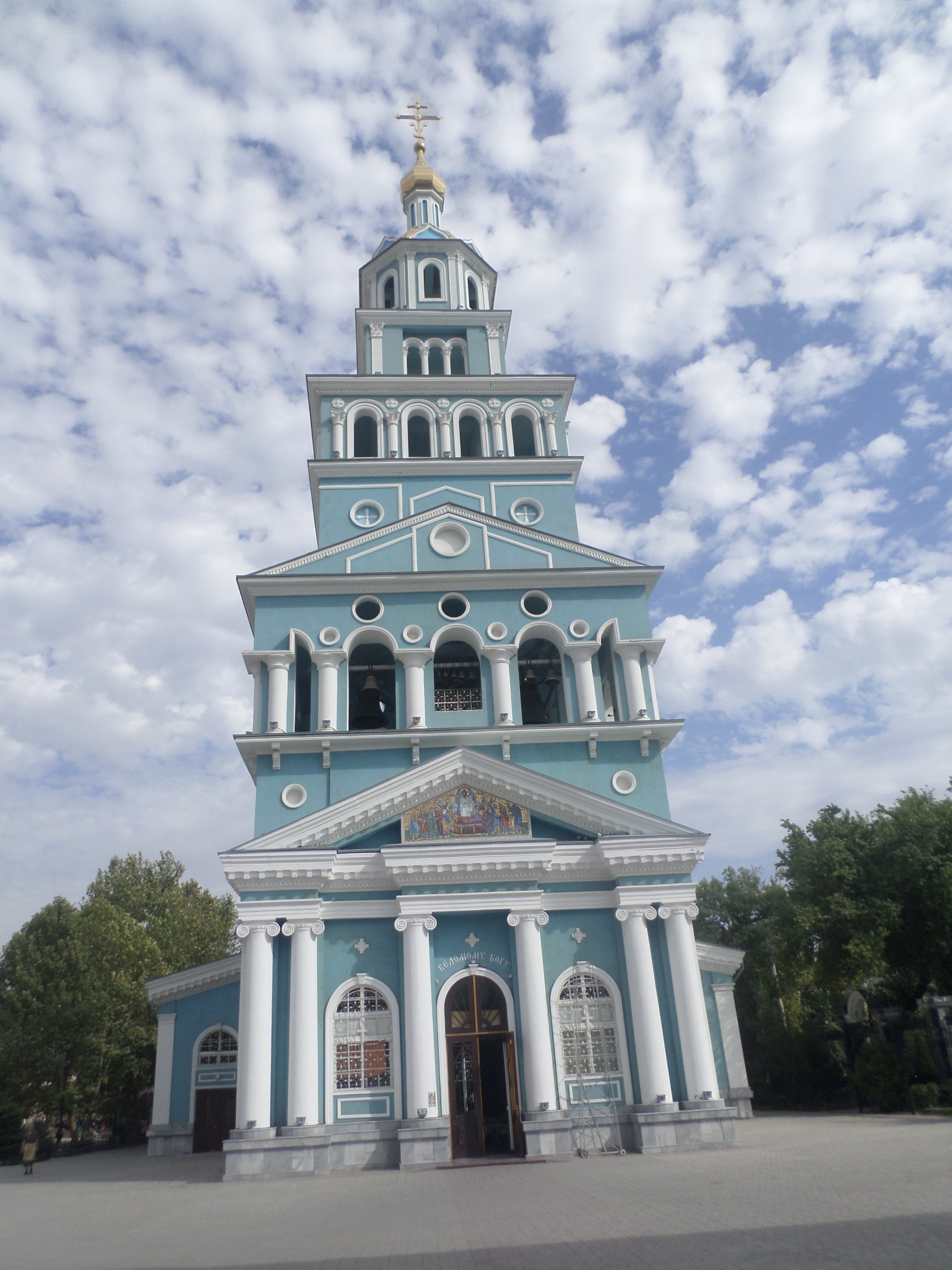
The main facade of the Cathedral of the Dormition of the Mother of God

The Cathedral of the Assumption of the Virgin or more properly the Cathedral of the Dormition of the Mother of God (Russian: Успенский кафедральный собор, Uspenskij kafedral'nyj sobor; Uzbek: Tangri Onasi Vafoti kafedral sobori-jome’si) is the Russian Orthodox cathedral of the diocese of Tashkent in Uzbekistan since 1945. The cathedral was built in 1871 and enlarged in the 1990s, the bell tower was rebuilt in 2010.

The present building was built in 1871 and was dedicated to St. Panteleimon. An old church cemetery was replaced in the service of the Military Hospital of Tashkent. Like most parishes in Central Asia, the church was assigned in 1922 to the Living Church movement, which was promoted by the Bolsheviks. It was closed for worship in 1933 and in 1945 became a military depot.

The church was restored and reopened for worship in December 1945. It was then devoted to the Dormition, and became the seat of the Bishop of Tashkent.

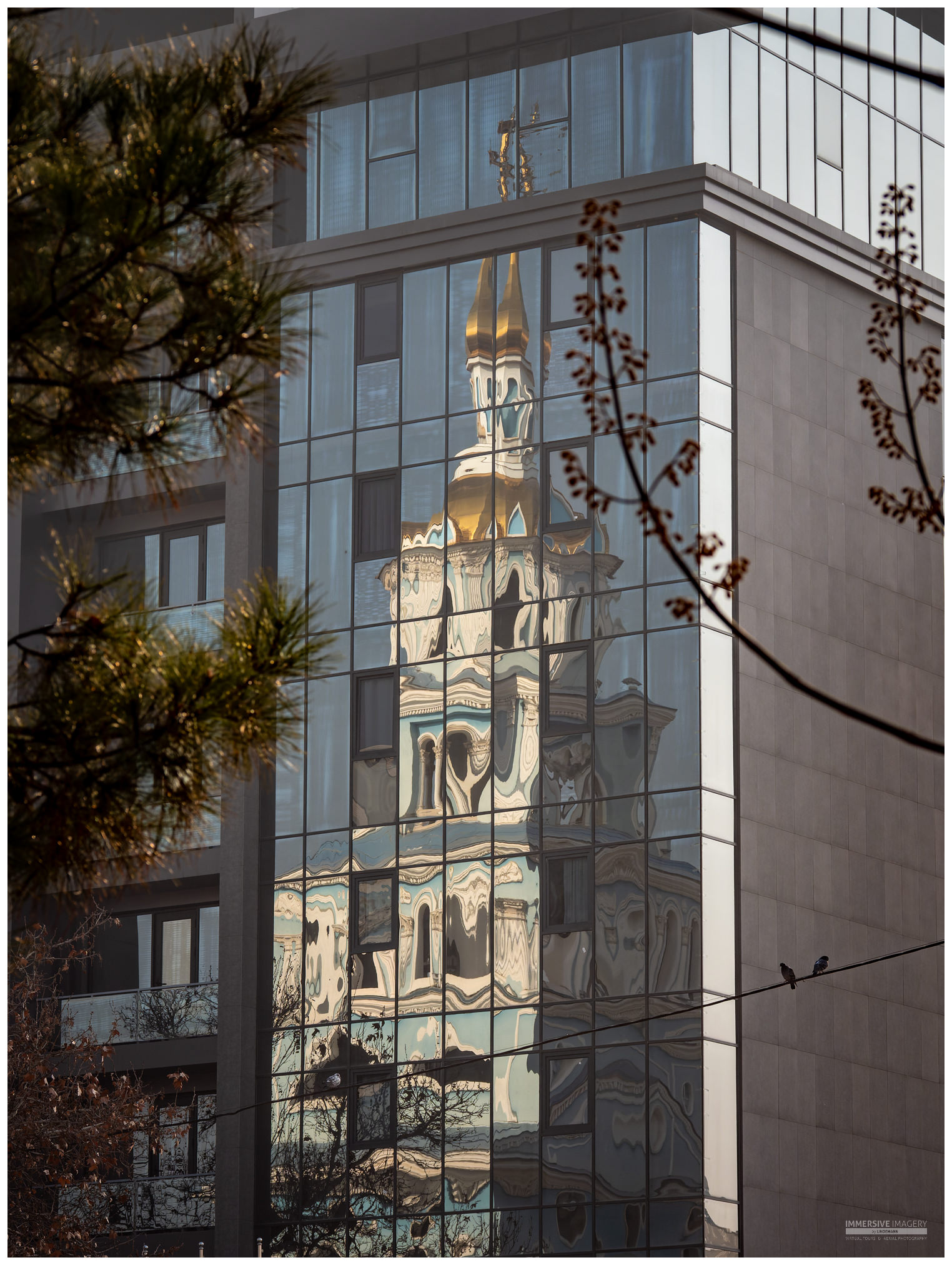

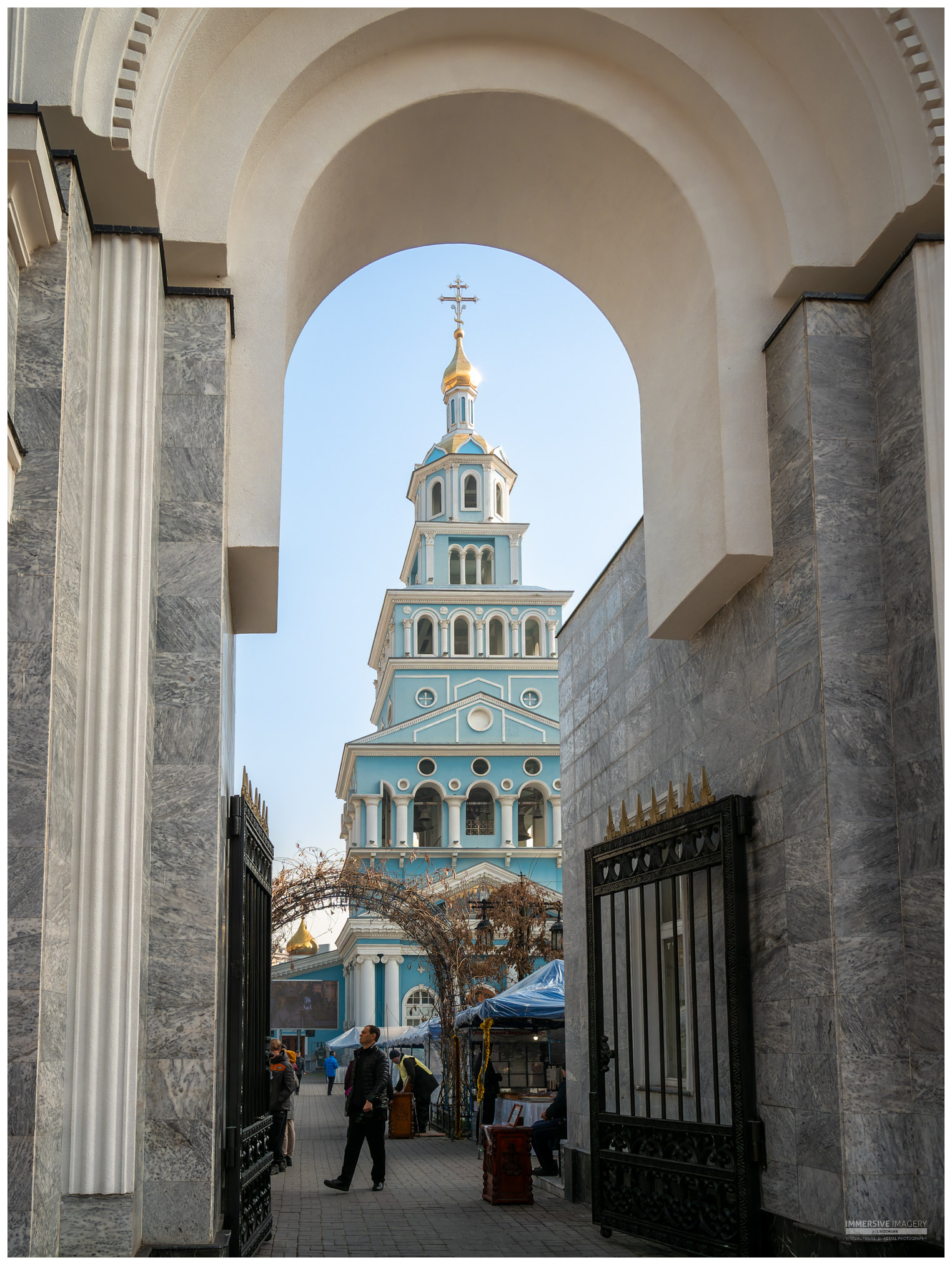

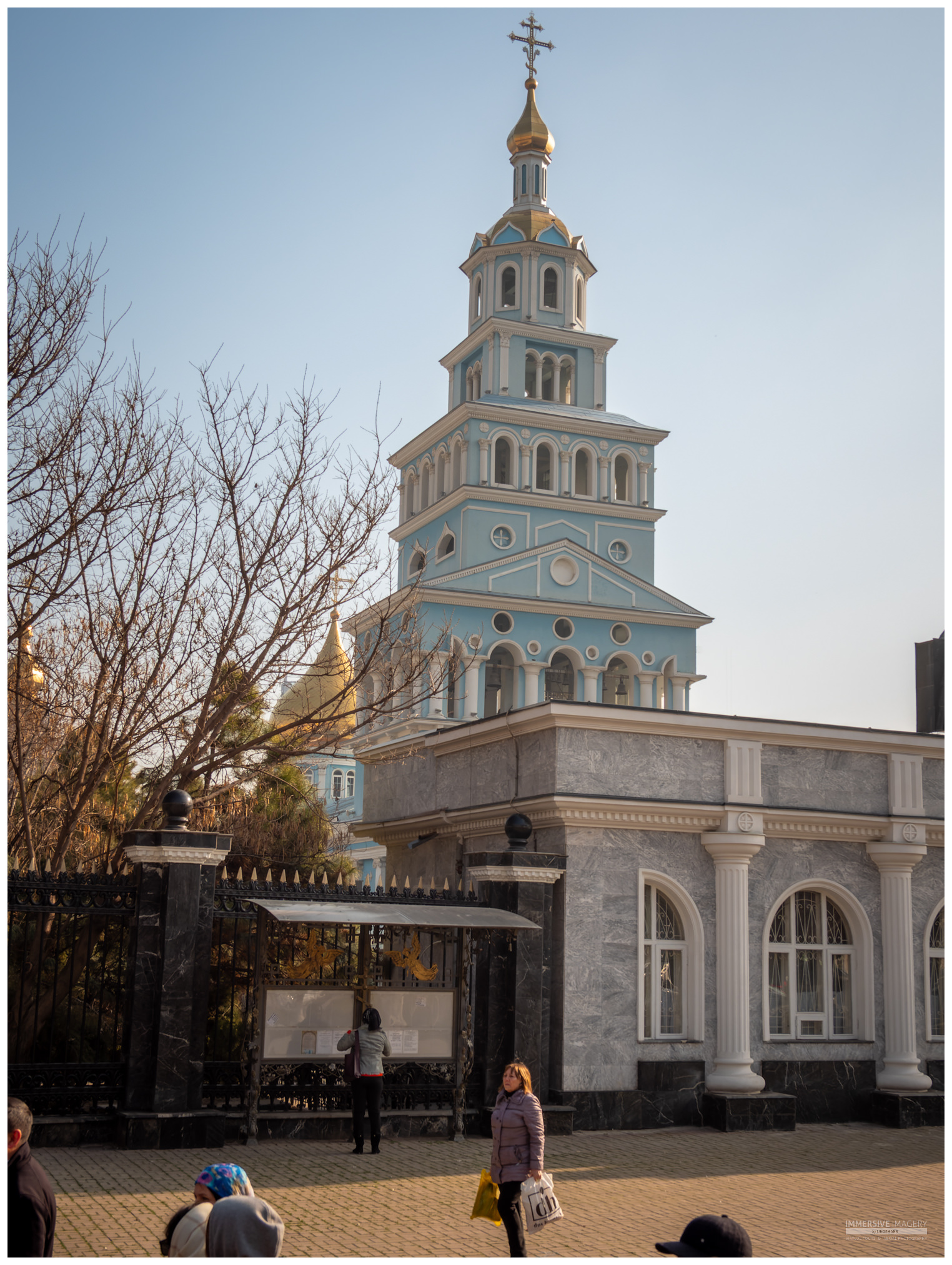

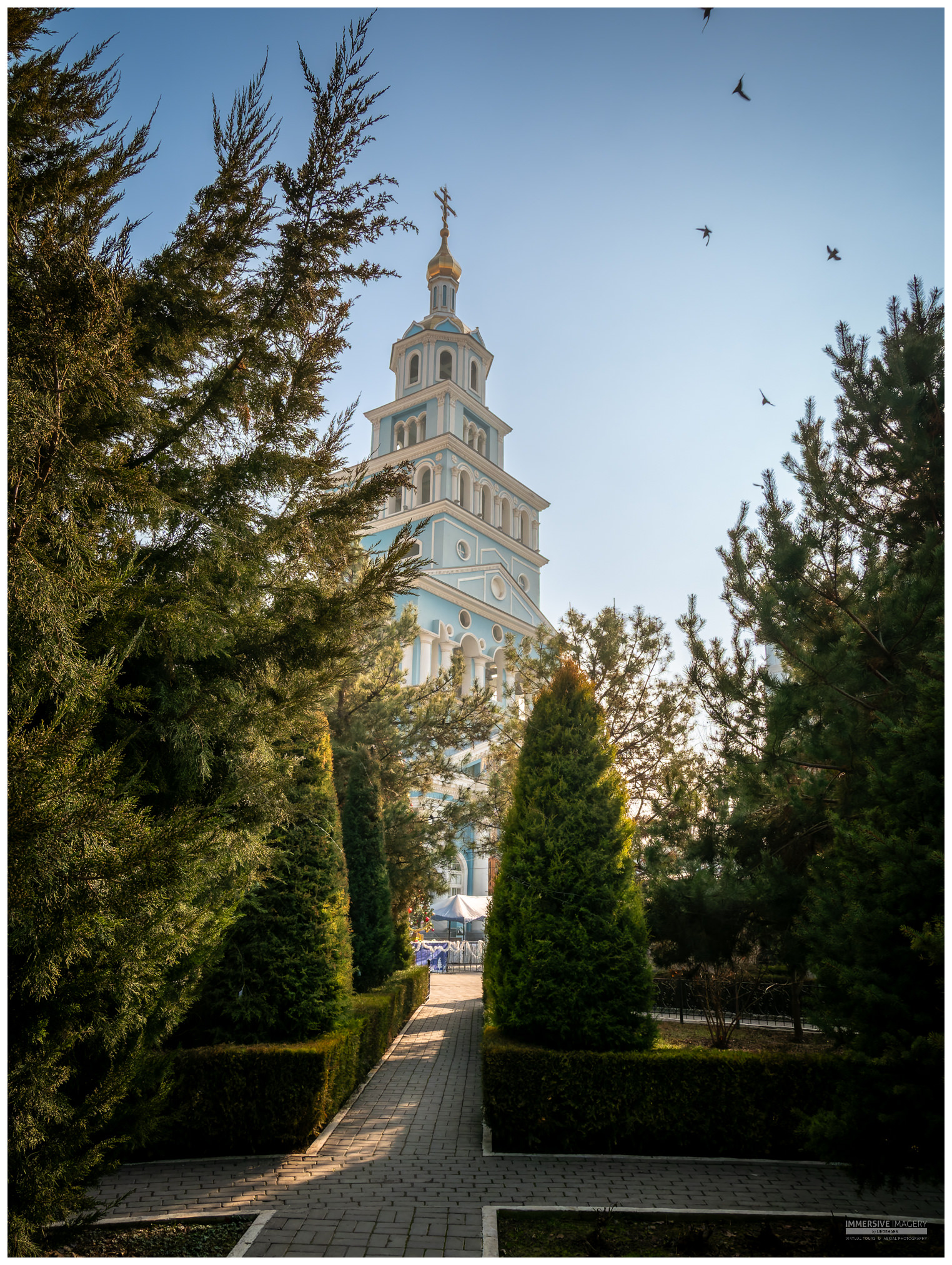

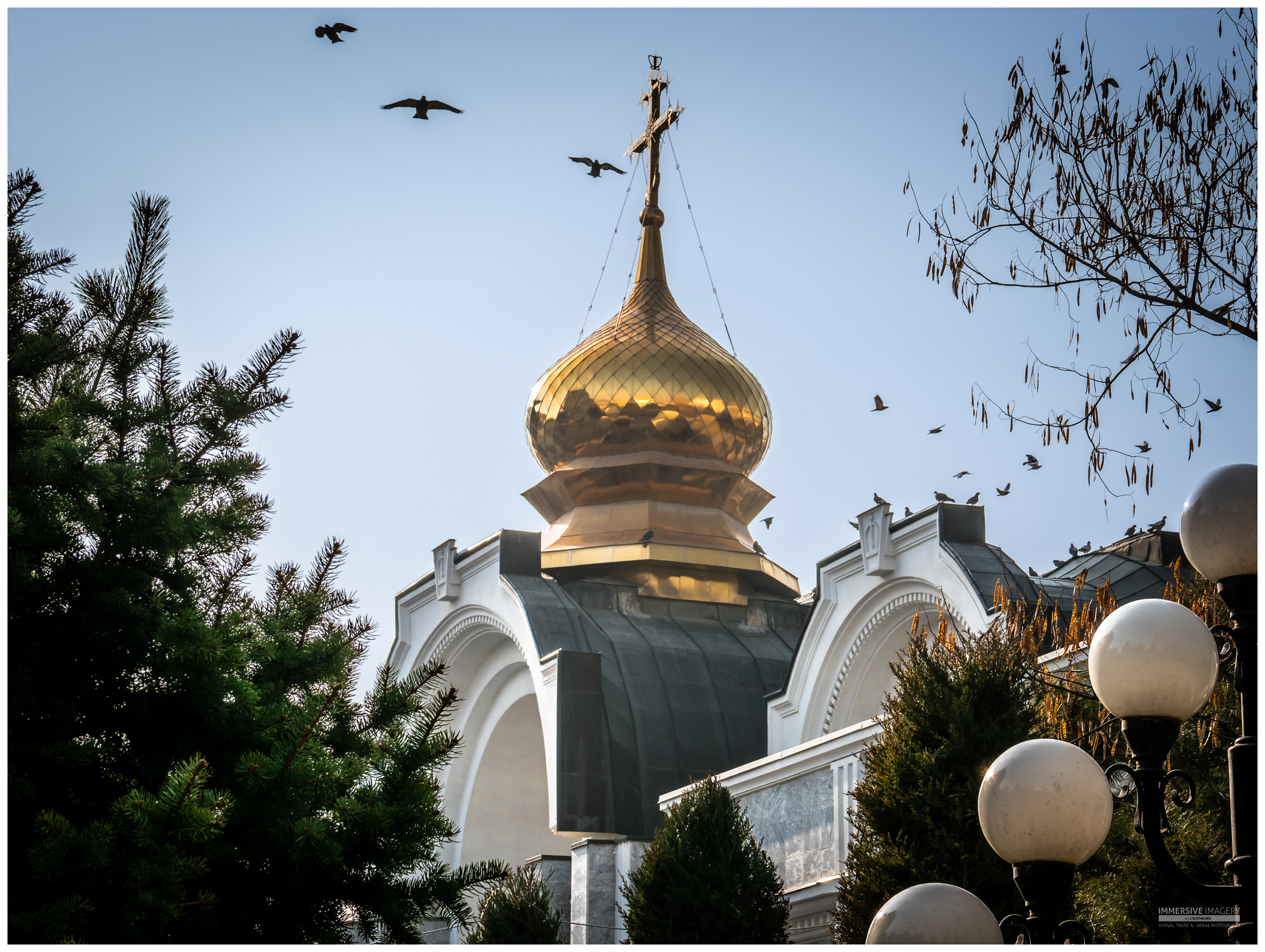

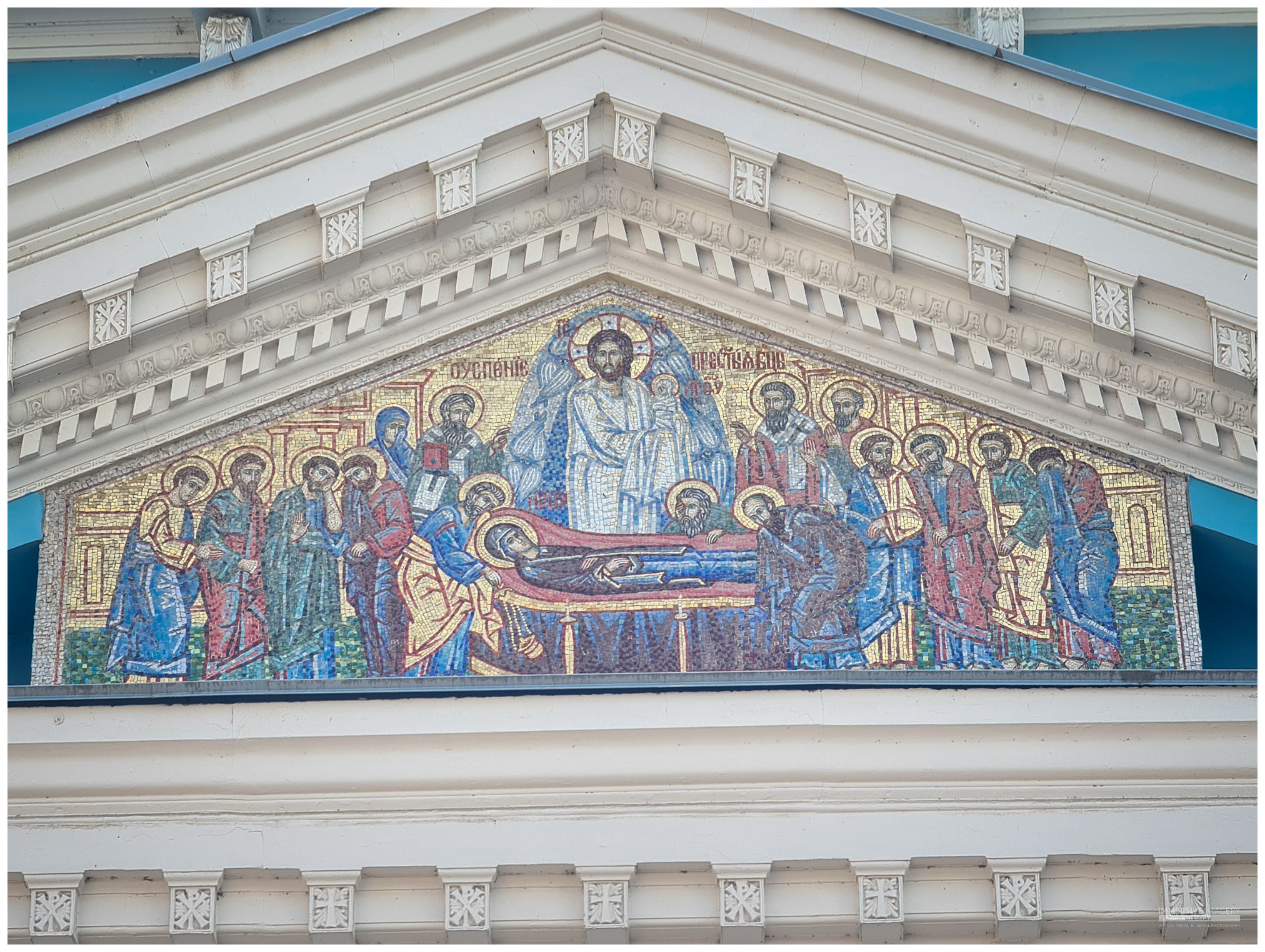

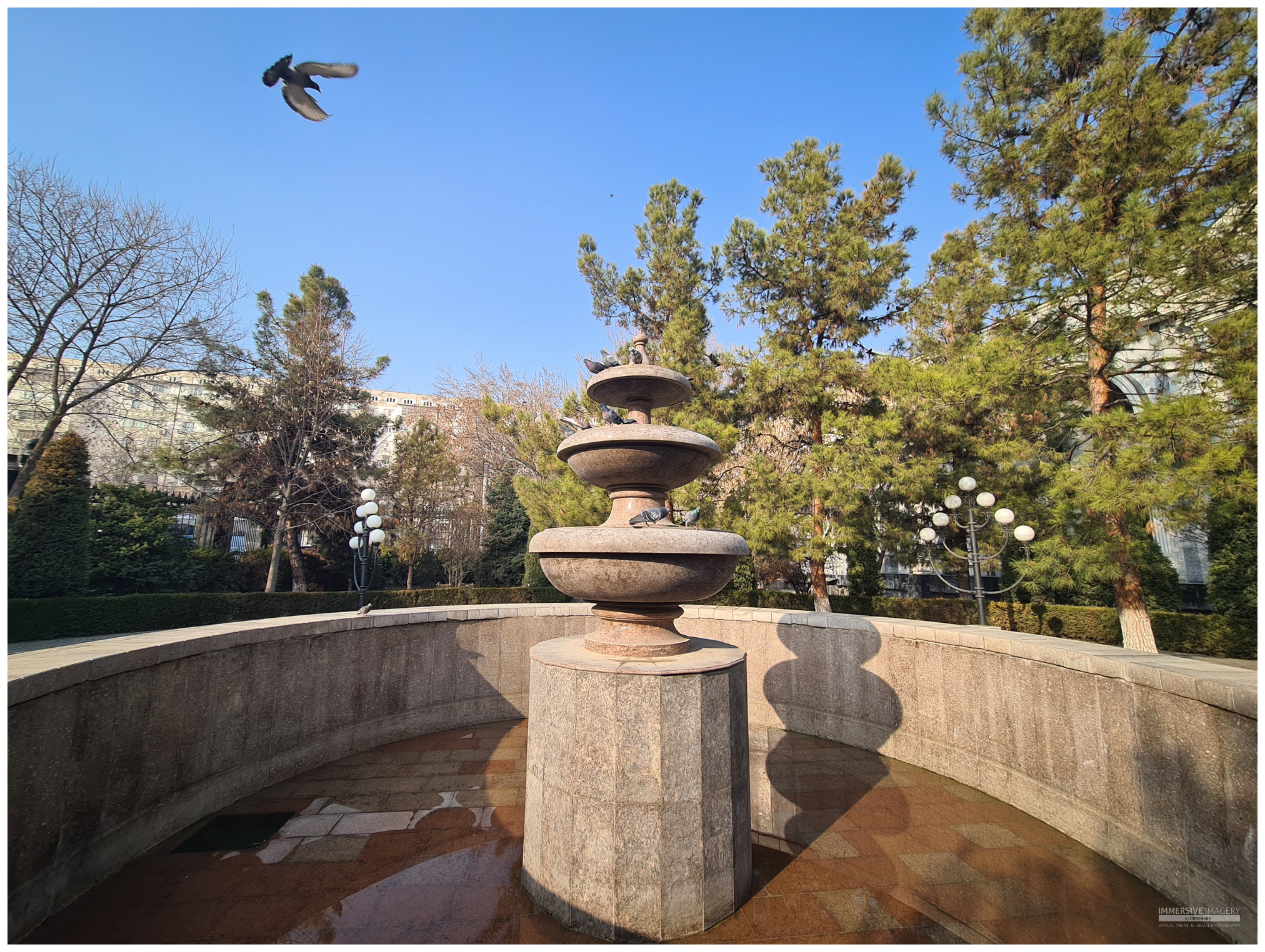

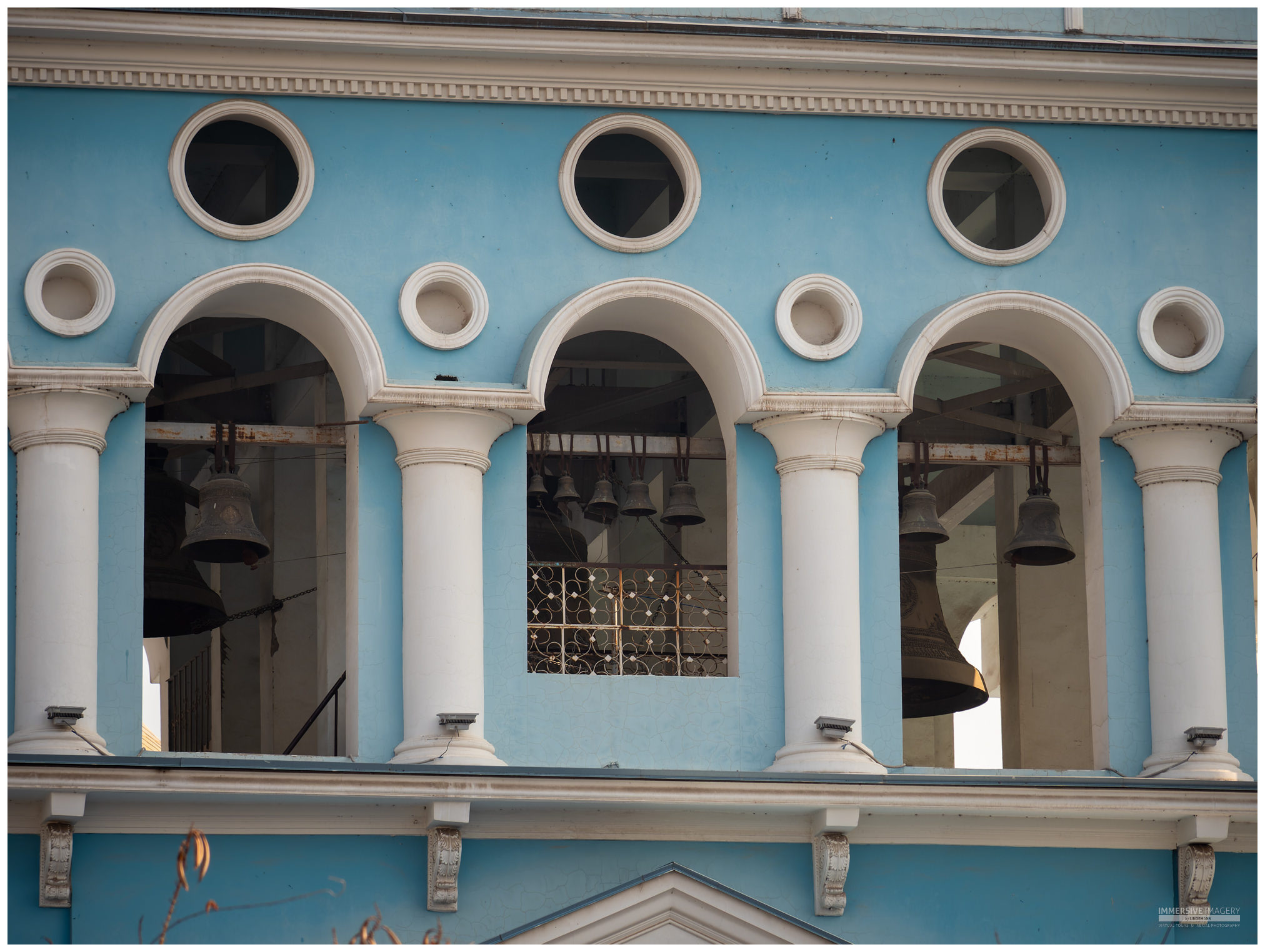

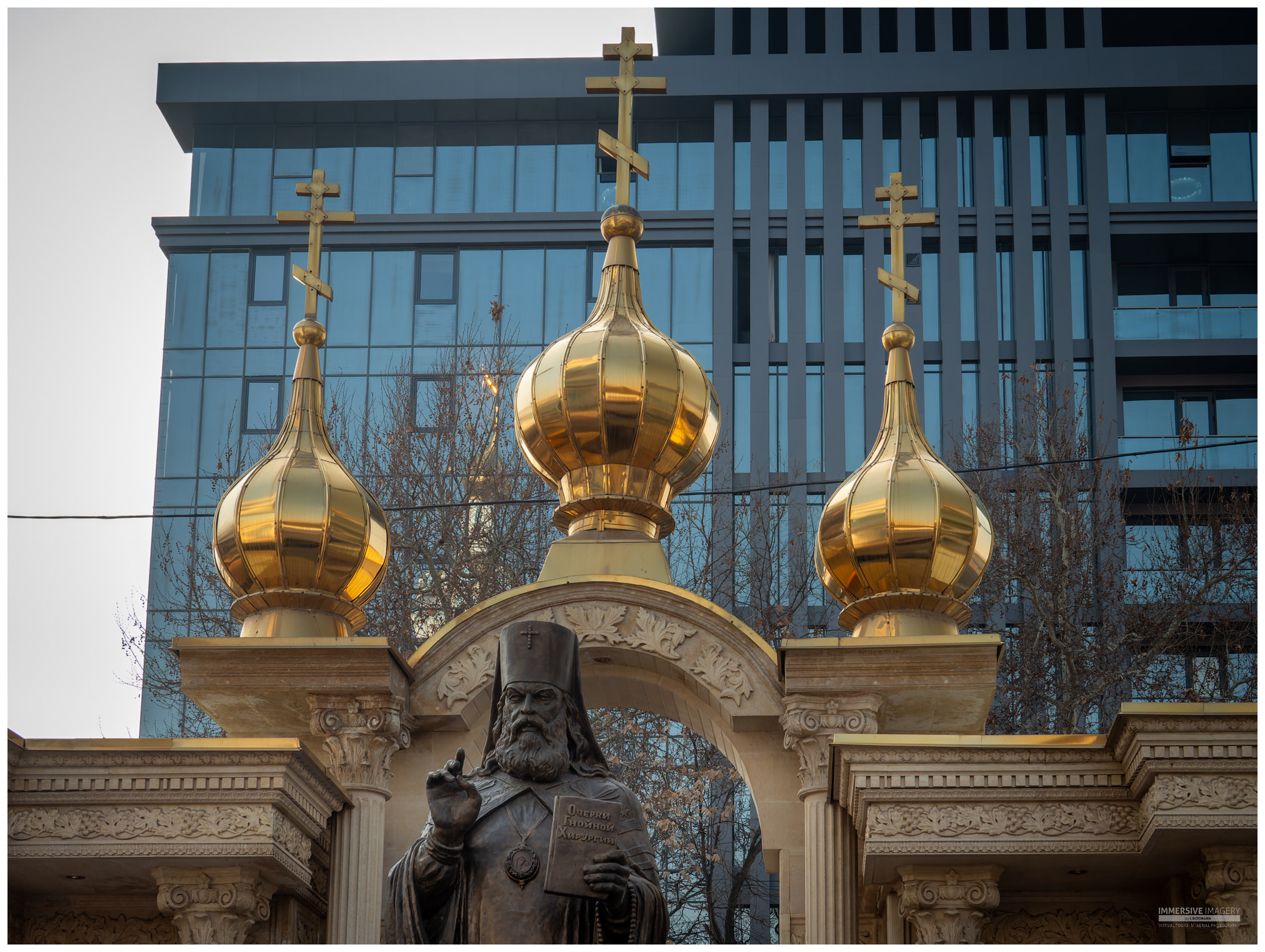

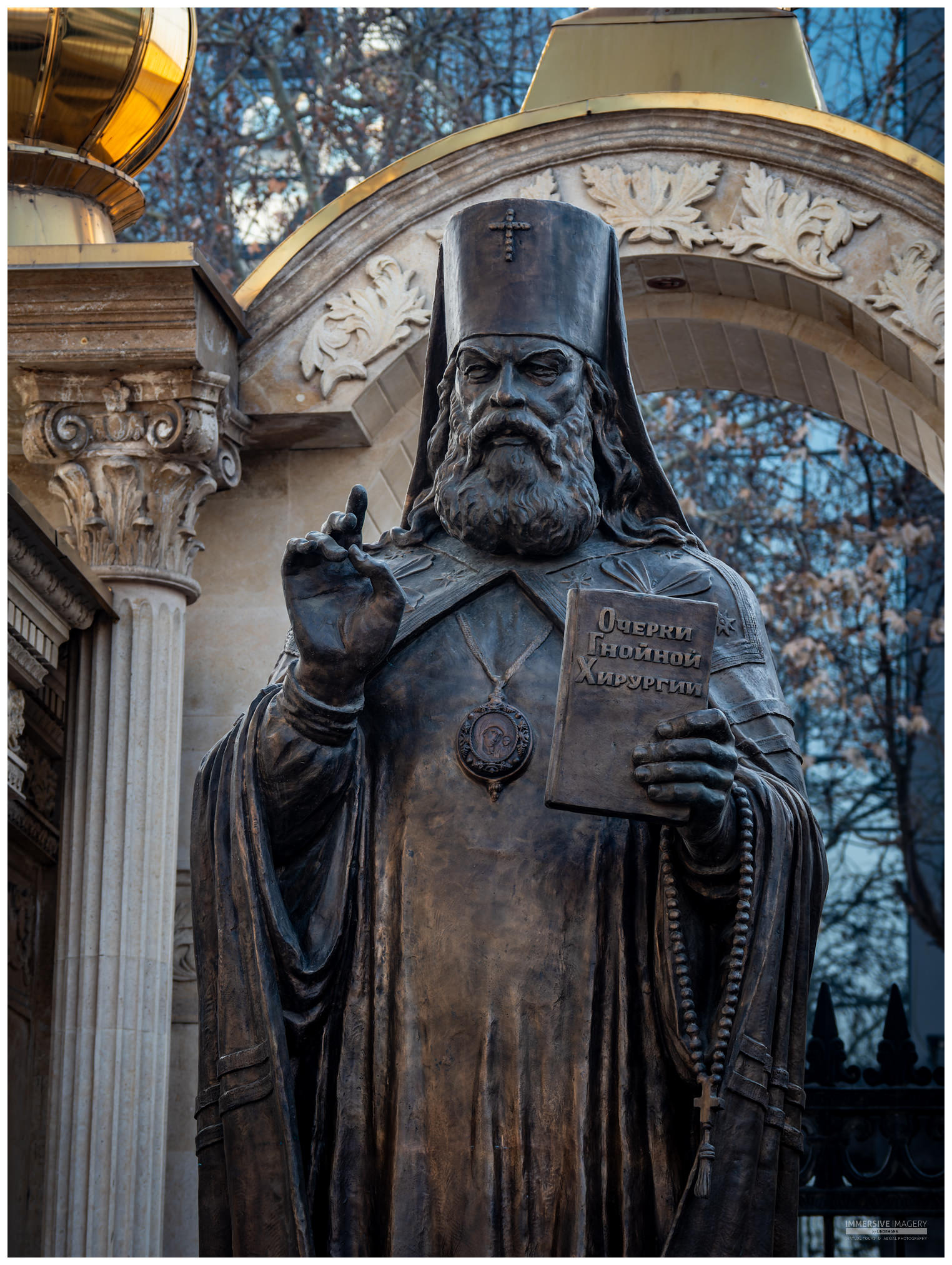

The bell tower was rebuilt in the 1990s, next to the main dome. The interior was redecorated with more pomp, especially for the visit on 10 November 1996 by Patriarch Alexis II. The cathedral was remodeled and a new bell tower built in the spring of 2010.

== See also ==
- Russian Orthodox Church in Uzbekistan
- Eastern Orthodoxy in Uzbekistan
- Assumption Cathedral (disambiguation), other cathedrals with the same dedication
