= Russian Orthodox Church in Uzbekistan =

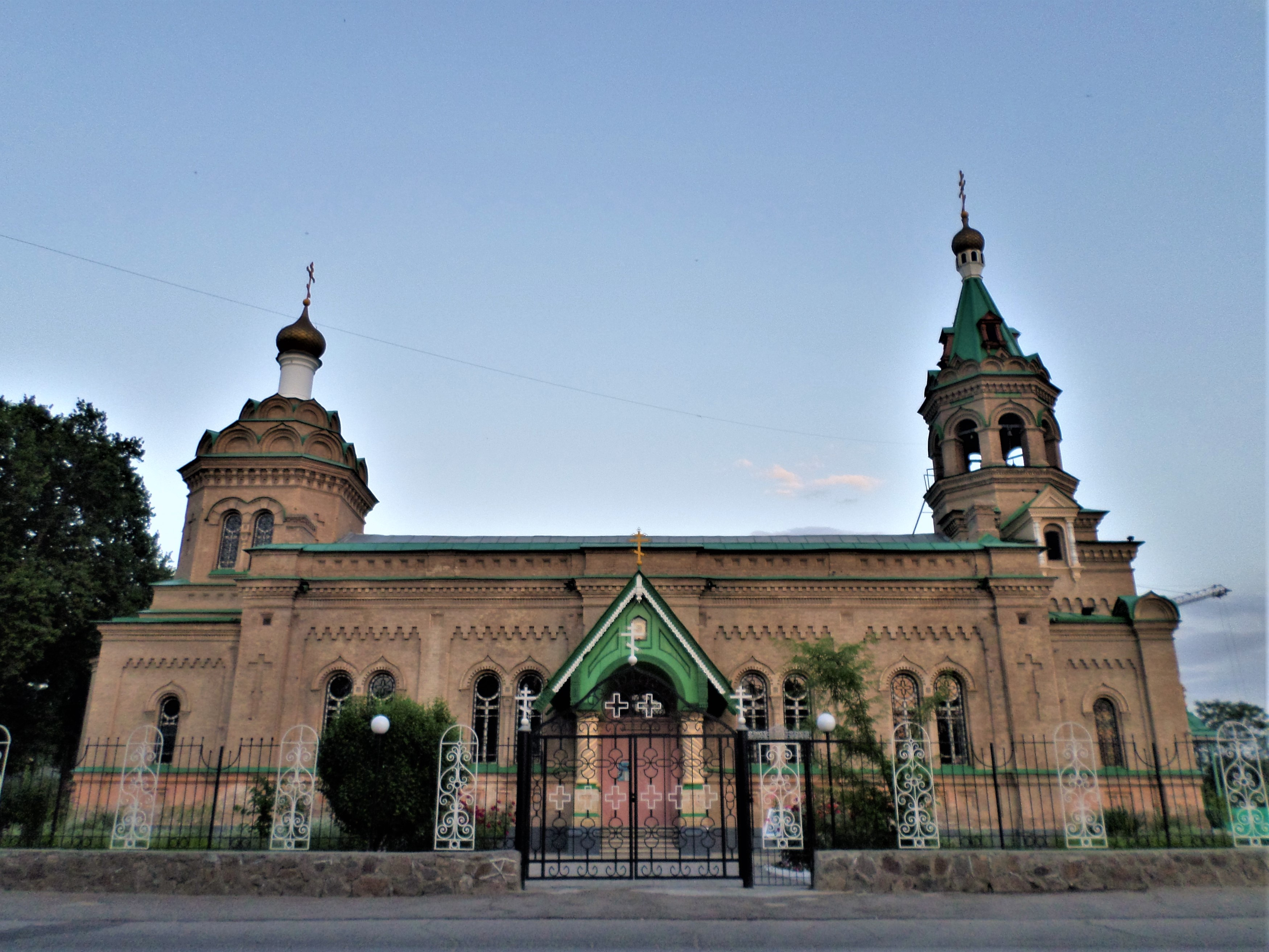
A Russian Orthodox church in Samarkand

The Russian Orthodox Church in Uzbekistan is the main community of Eastern Orthodox Christianity in Uzbekistan, a predominantly Muslim country. Many of its members are Russians. Uzbekistan falls within Tashkent and the Central Asian Eparchy of the Russian Orthodox Church. The Eparchy is headed by a Metropolitan. Since 2011, the current Metropolitan of Tashkent and Central Asia is Vincent (Morar).

Russian Orthodox Church in Uzbekistan has been established in 1871 and extends to Tajikistan, Turkmenistan, and Kyrgyzstan. The Russian Orthodox Church has a better standing with the government than other religious groups do. The constitution establishes a secular framework to separate church and state.

Government figures in 2020 suggested that 2.2% of the population of Uzbekistan are Orthodox Christians, most of whom are ethnic Russians.

== See also ==
- Religion in Uzbekistan
- Christianity in Uzbekistan
- Eastern Orthodoxy in Uzbekistan
- Protestantism in Uzbekistan
- Roman Catholicism in Uzbekistan
