= Christianity in Uzbekistan =

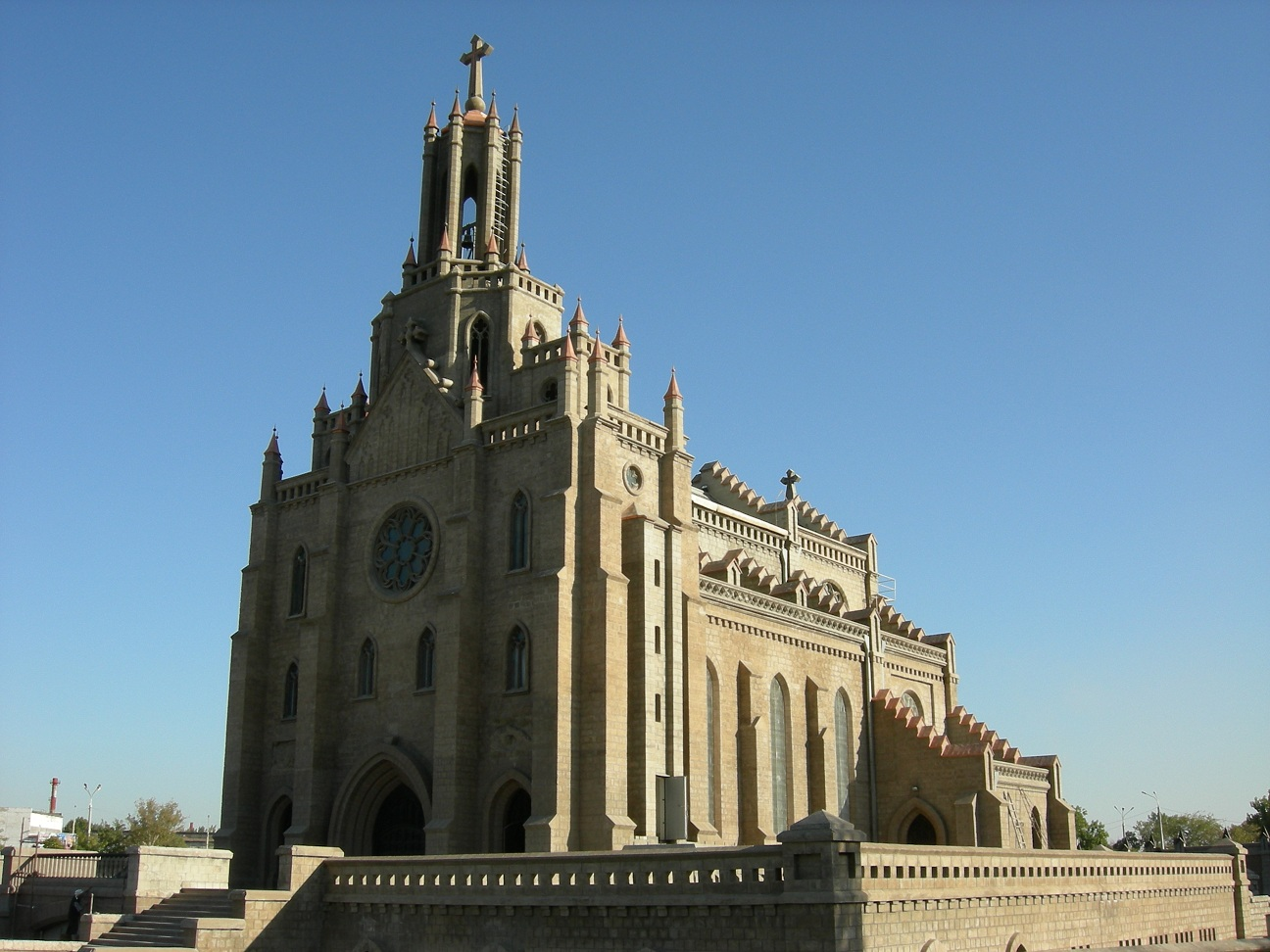
Sacred Heart Cathedral, Tashkent (Roman Catholic)

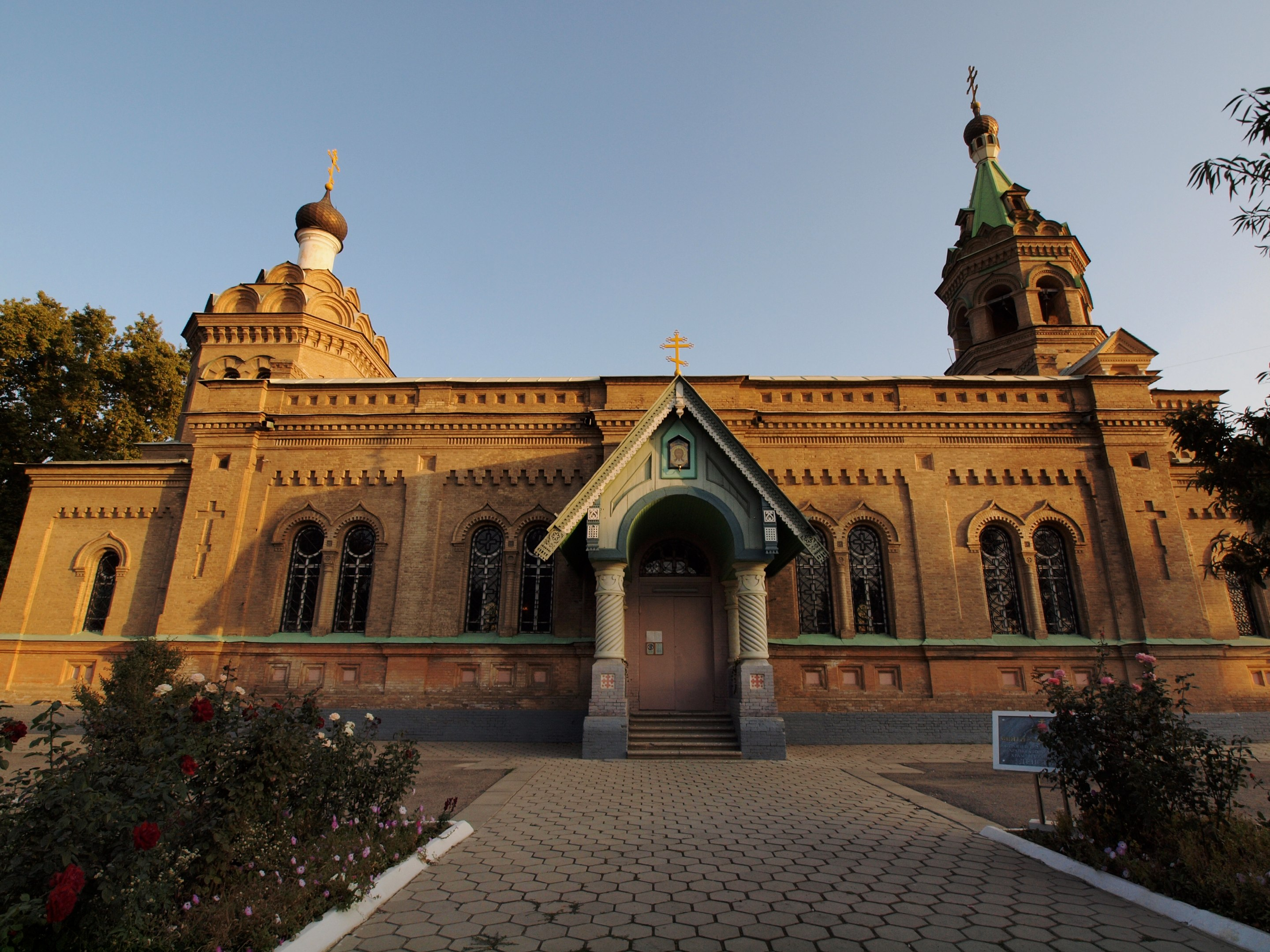
A Russian Orthodox church in Samarkand

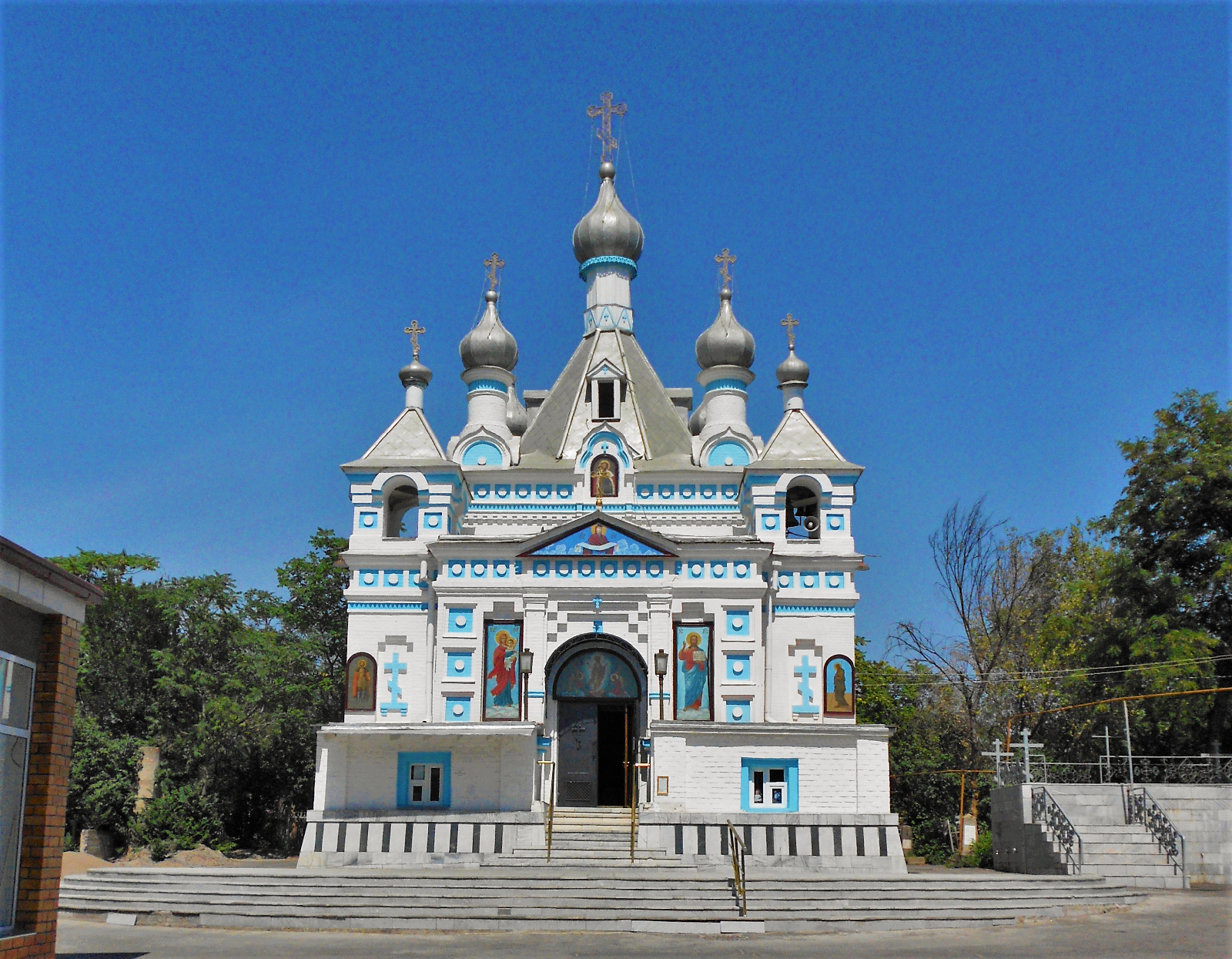
Alexander Nevsky Cathedral, Tashkent

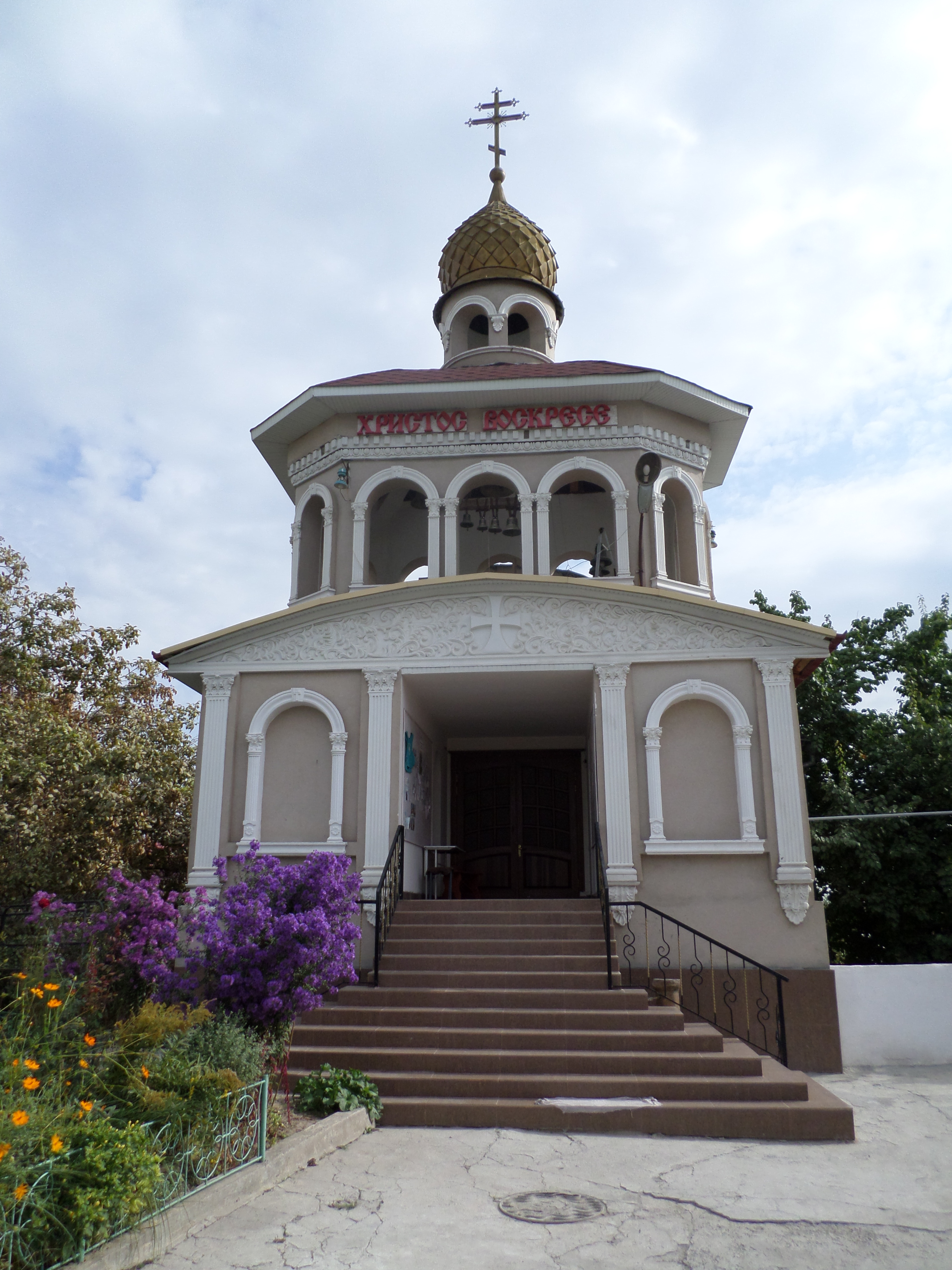
The Church of Hieromartyr Hermogenes in Tashkent

Christianity in Uzbekistan is a minority religion.

Christianity accounted for 2.3% of the population or 630,000 according to a 2010 study by Pew Research Center. Government figures in 2020 suggested this had changed to 2.2%-3.7%.

== History ==
Historically, Uzbekistan had communities of Eastern Christians, including Nestorians and Jacobites (historically associated with miaphysitism). Around the 14th century, Christianity began rapidly declining. Factors to the decline included a plague that spread into the region which killed off much of the Christian communities living there. Remaining Christians probably converted to Islam due to economic reasons. Under the Timurids, the political situation likely exacerbated the already struggling community.

The last Christians in Samarkand and Central Asia were reportedly persecuted by his grandson, Ulugh Beg. However, due to a lack of reliable records, the details surrounding the decline of the Syriac Christians of the area remains obscure.

Christianity returned to the region after the Russian conquest in 1867, when Orthodox churches were built in large cities, to serve Russian and European settlers and officers.

According to a 2010 study by Pew Research Center 2.5% of the population of Uzbekistan are Orthodox Christians. Government figures in 2020 suggested that 2.2% of the population of Uzbekistan are Orthodox Christians, most of whom are ethnic Russians. There are about 4,000 Roman Catholics in Uzbekistan.

== Christian converts ==
A 2015 study estimates some 10,000 Christians come from a Muslim background in the country, most of them belonging an Evangelical or Charismatic Protestant sect.

There is strong pressure on Christians from a Muslim background in remote areas.

== Protestants ==
Protestants made up about 0.15% of the population in 2020. The Evangelical Lutheran Church in Uzbekistan has seven parishes. The seat of the bishop is Tashkent. The president of the synod is Gilda Razpopova.

=== Denominations ===
- Baptist Union in Uzbekistan
- Evangelical Lutheran Church in Russia, Ukraine, Kazakhstan and Central Asia
- Baptist Churches
- Methodist Church
- Presbyterian church
- Seventh-day Adventist Church

== Jehovah's Witnesses ==
Jehovah’s Witnesses were present in Uzbekistan for decades before the country became an independent nation in 1991. Since 1992 Uzbekistan authorities continue to deny legal registration to all congregations of Jehovah’s Witnesses except for one in Chirchik. There are estimated to be 500 followers of the religious organization just in Chirchik alone. Under Uzbek law, Jehovah's Witnesses have a right to hold meetings only in the Kingdom Hall, while any religious propaganda is prohibited.

== See also ==
- Religion in Uzbekistan
- Roman Catholicism in Uzbekistan
- Russian Orthodox Church in Uzbekistan
- Eastern Orthodoxy in Uzbekistan
- Protestantism in Uzbekistan
- Human rights in Uzbekistan § Freedom of religion
