= Vincent Morar =

Metropolitan of Central Asia

Metropolitan Vincent Morar
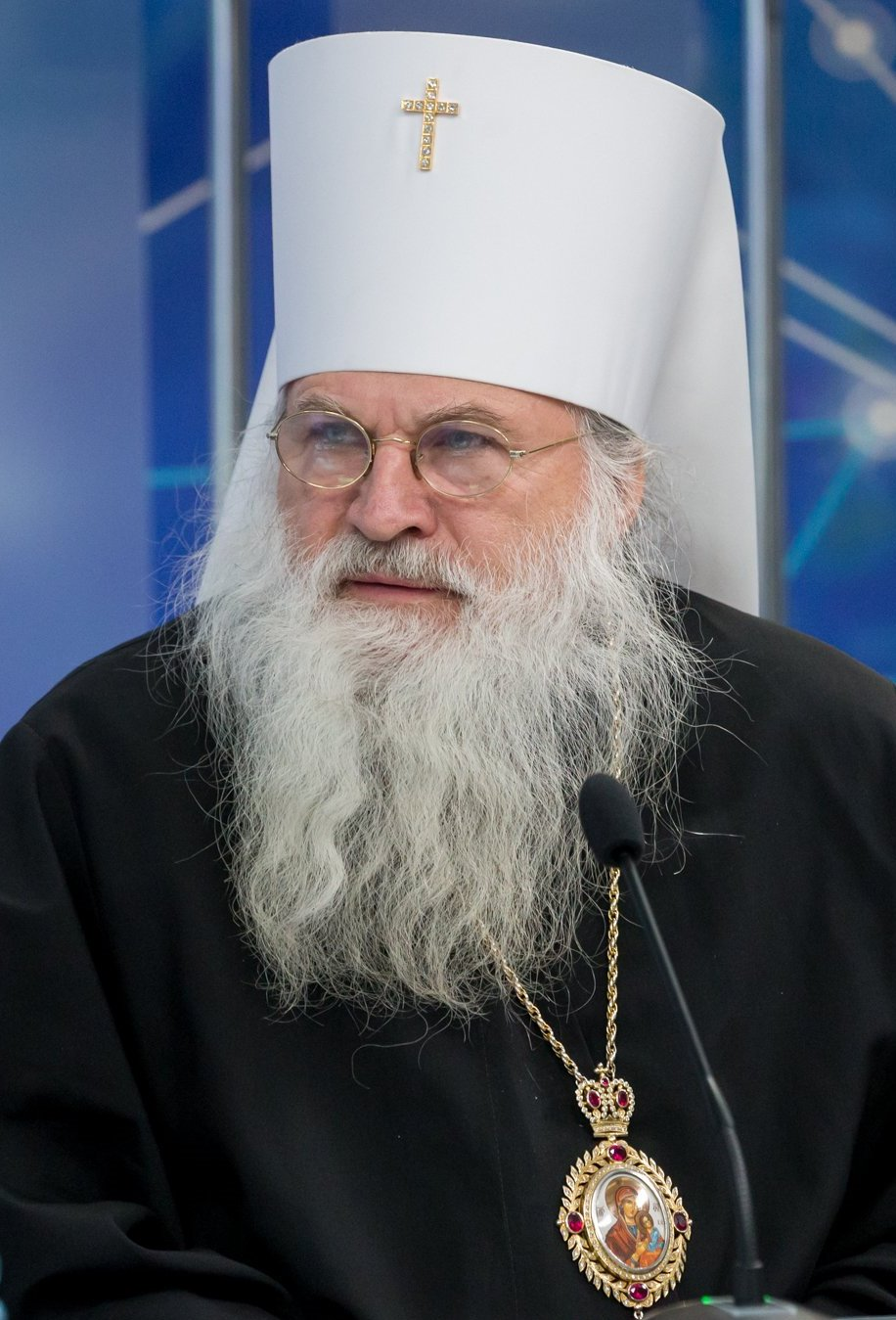
- Born: December 4, 1953 (age 72); Sculeni, Moldavian SSR, USSR
- Citizenship: Moldova; Russia
- Education: Moscow Theological Academy
- Church: Russian Orthodox Church

Vincent (Vikenty, Vichentie, Russian: Викентий; born Viktor Aleksandrovich Morar or Morari or Moraru, on December 4, 1953), is a bishop of the Russian Orthodox Church. He serves as Metropolitan of Tashkent and Uzbekistan and he is a permanent member of the Holy Synod of the Russian Orthodox Church.

== Life ==
Victor Moraru was born in Sculeni, Moldavian SSR. His father was an Orthodox priest. He wanted to become a physician, but because of his family's religiosity, he chose to become a priest. In 1981 he was tonsured a monk in honour of saint Vincent of Saragossa. In 1982 he graduated from the Moscow Theological Academy.

On July 20, 1990, the Holy Synod of the Russian Orthodox Church elected Vincent Morari as Bishop of Bender (Tighina, Moldova). The ceremony was held by Patriarch Alexy II of Moscow. Wincenty has been involved in the establishment and development of the Teological Seminary at the Noul Neamț Monastery in Chițcani, which is currently the largest spiritual and educational center of the Chișinău Metropolis. This period also coincided with the Gagauz independence movement and with the war in Transnistria. He sees the Transnistrian conflict as an incomprehensible war, in which, according to him, they fought "son against father, brother against brother", describing the people who fought on both sides as "our soldiers".

Along with Vladimir Cantarean, he was a strong opponent of the reactivation of the Metropolis of Bessarabia (under the leadership of Peter (Păduraru)) within the Romanian Orthodox Church, even persecuting some of its believers.

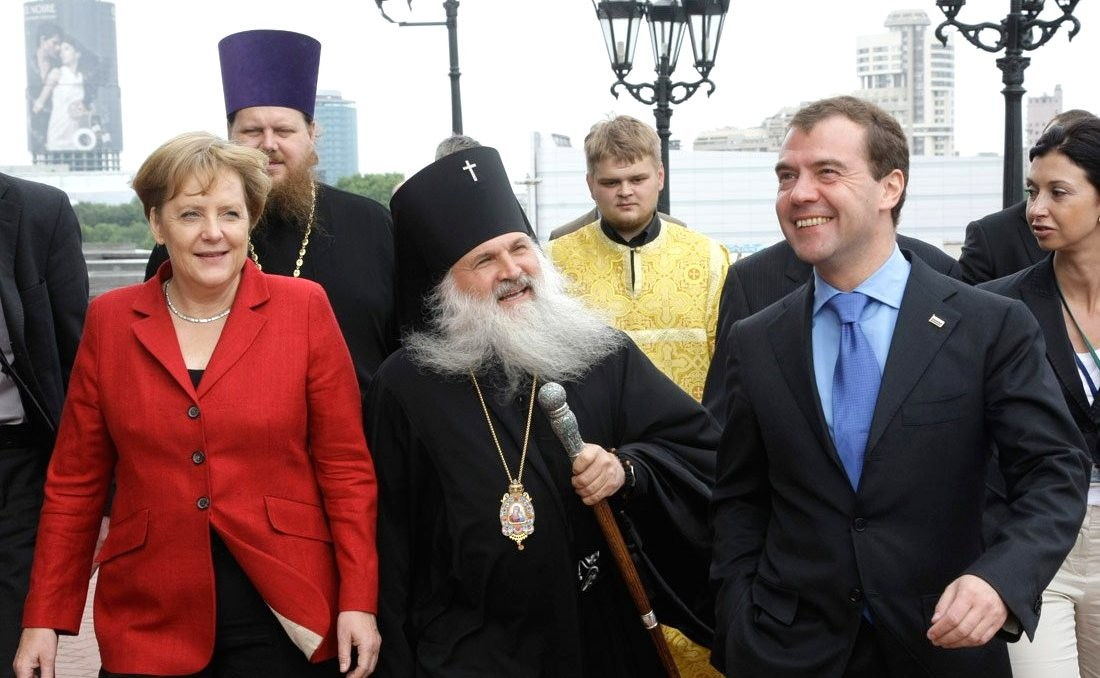
Vincent with German Chancellor Angela Merkel and Russian President Dmitry Medvedev during their visit to Ekaterinburg in 2010

In July 1995, he was appointed by the Holy Synod bishop of Abakan and Kyzyl. In February 1999 he was raised to the rank of Archbishop and in July that year he was elected Archbishop of Yekaterinburg and Verhotursk. He also became rector of the Ekaterinburg Theological Seminary.

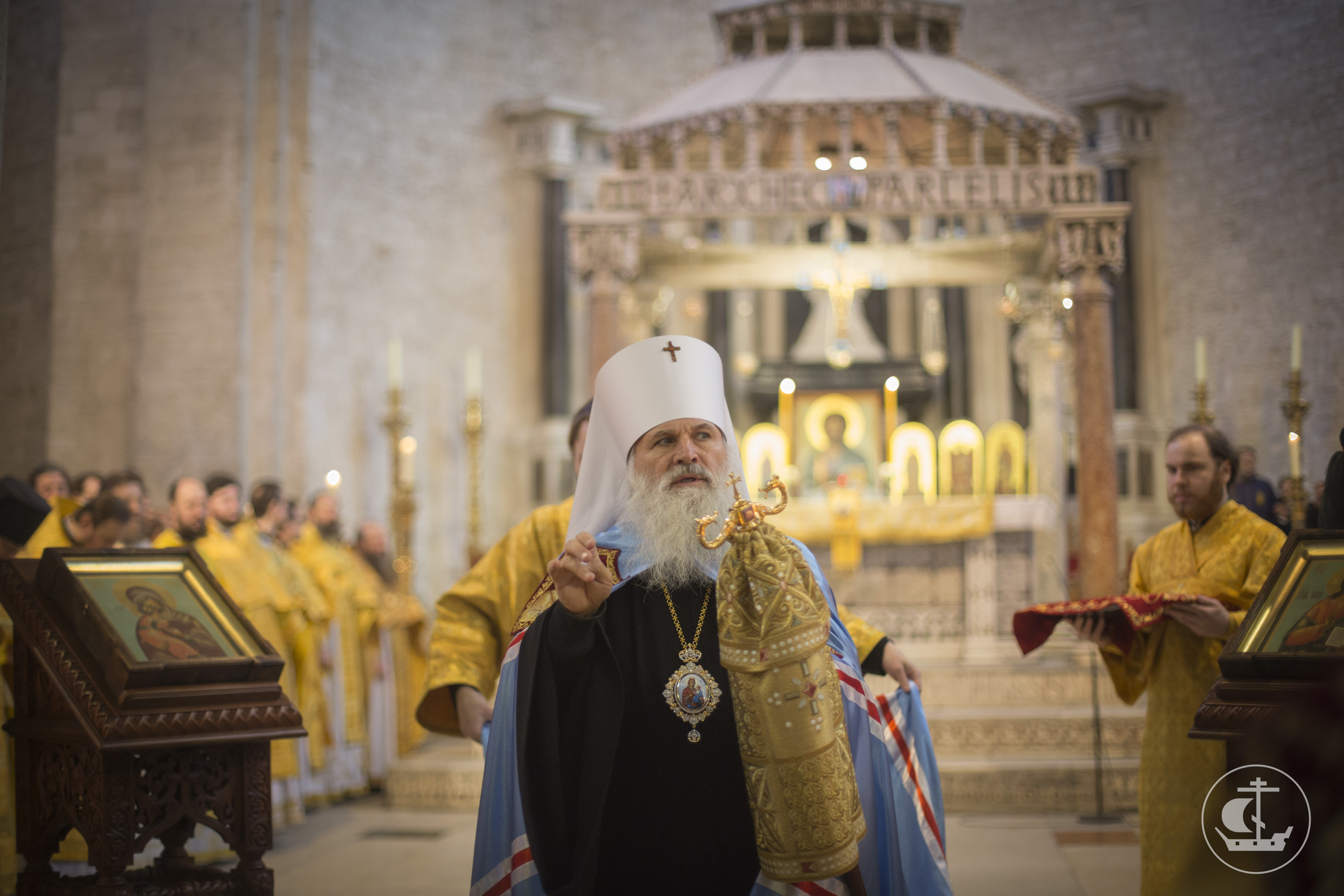
Metropolitan Vincent in Basilica of Saint Nicholas, Bari in 2013

The local press in Ekaterinburg repeatedly accused him of a tendency toward "luxury", especially because "in the face of poverty in Russia", he sat in a “Tsarist seat”, to which Archbishop Wincenty replied: “the terrible catastrophe in Russia has happened from this imaginary struggle with poverty - the revolution. If we are discussing this, then we should all sit down in misery."

On July 27, 2011, by the decision of the Holy Synod of the Russian Orthodox Church, he was appointed Bishop of Tashkent and Uzbekistan, head of the newly formed Central Asian Metropolitan District. In matters concerning the Central Asian Metropolitan District, as well as during liturgical commemoration in dioceses other than those headed by himself, he titled as Metropolitan of Central Asia. In addition, he was entrusted with the temporary management of the newly formed Bishkek and Dushanbe Diocese.

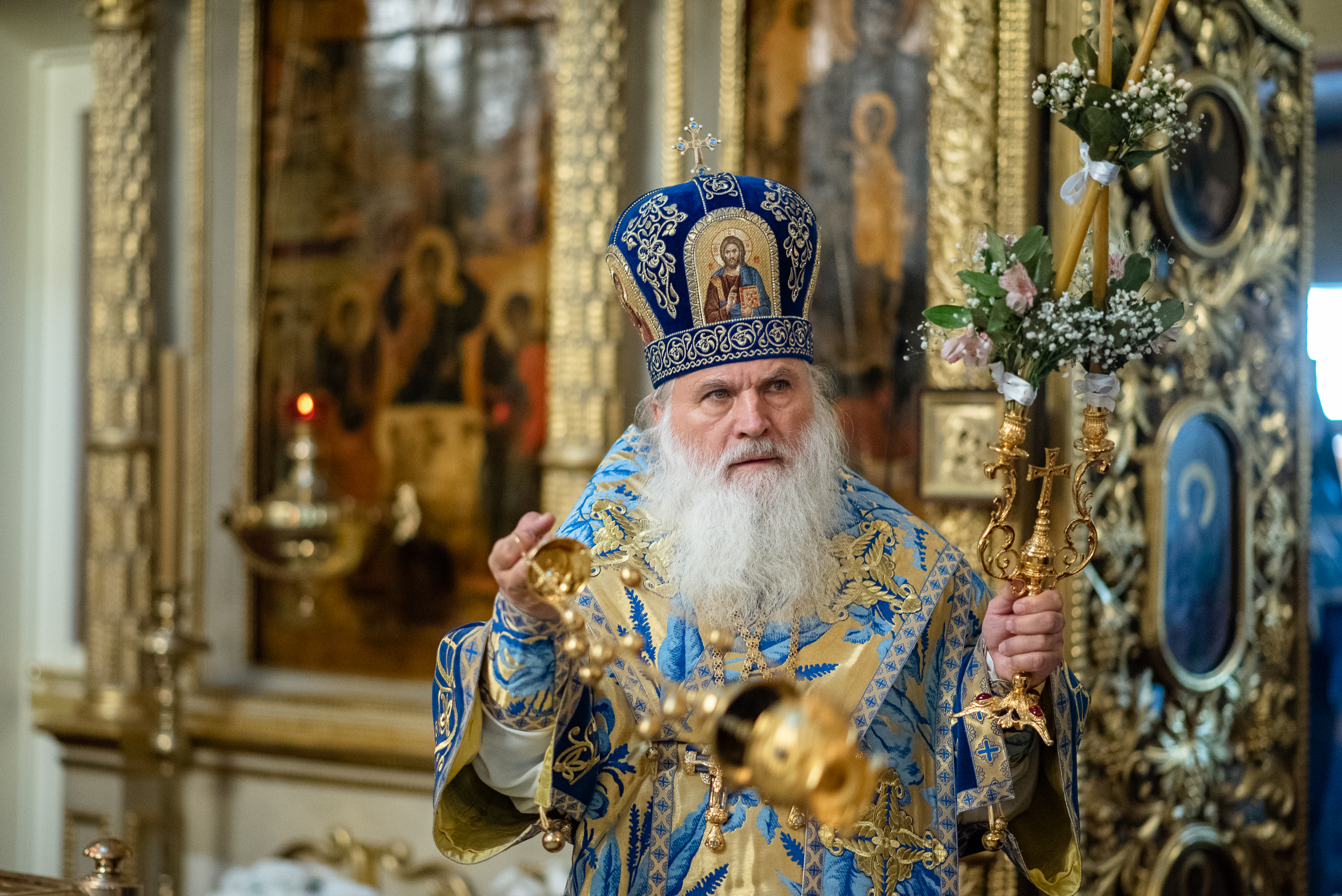
Metropolitan Vincent in 2019

Although active in Russia and Central Asia, Wincenty continued to visit Moldova and engage in the life of the local Orthodox Church.

Eastern Orthodox Church titles
New diocese	Bishop of Abakan and Kyzyl; 1995–1999	Succeeded by Jonathan Tsvetkov
Preceded by Nikon Mironov	Archbishop of Yekaterinburg; 1999–2011	Succeeded by Kirill Nakonechny
Preceded by Vladimir Ikim	Metropolitan of Tashkent and Uzbekistan; 2011–	Incumbent
