= Religion in Uzbekistan =

Religion in Uzbekistan (Ministry of Foreign Affairs 2020)
1. Islam (96.3%)
2. Christianity (2.20%)
3. Other religion (1.40%)
4. No religion (0.10%)

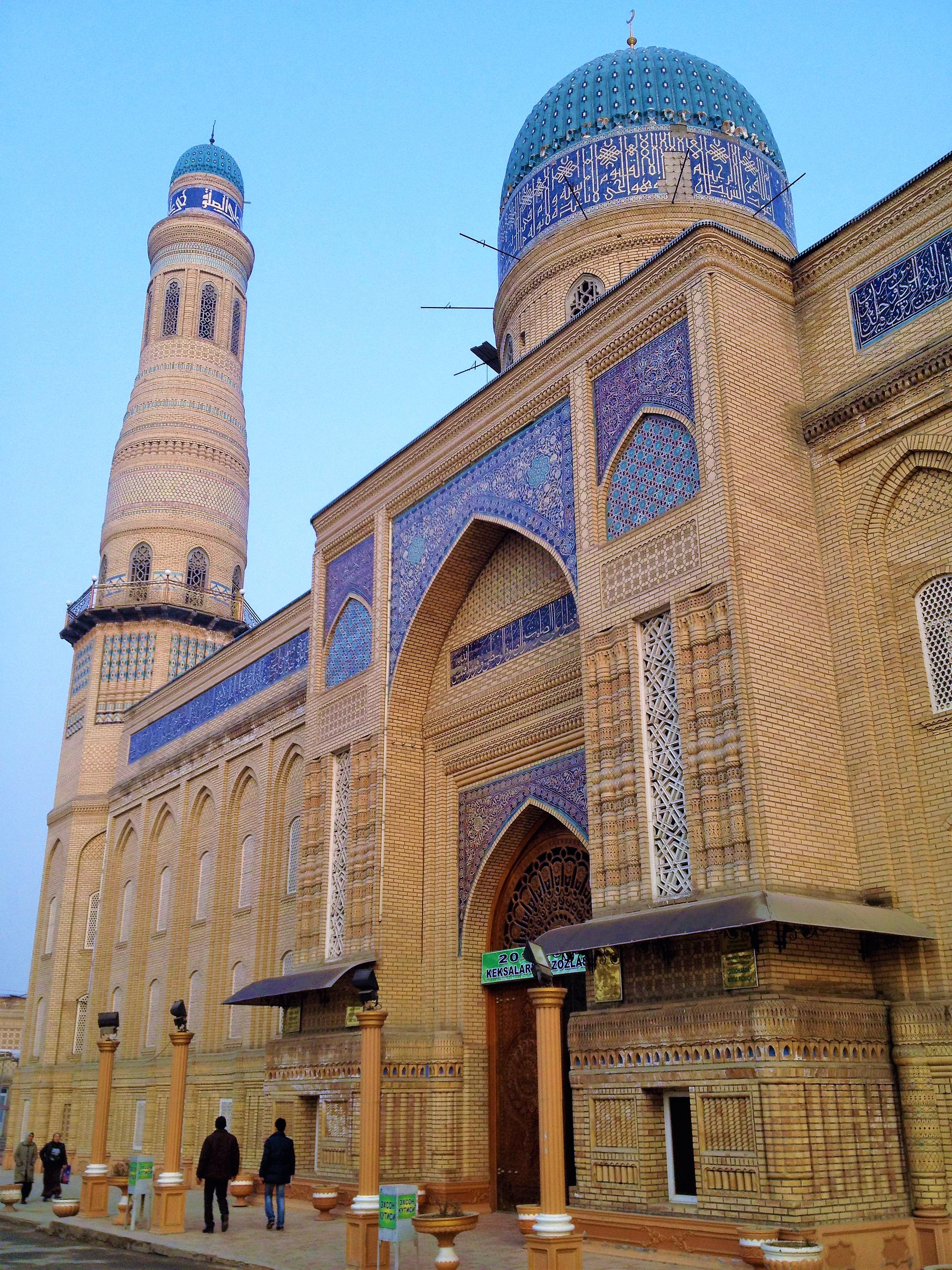
Devonaboy Mosque in Andijan. Islam is the main religion in Uzbekistan.

The predominant religion in Uzbekistan is Islam. The country also has a significant Christian population and other minorities.

In 2022, the Uzbek Ministry of Foreign Affairs estimated that Islam was followed by 97% of the population; most Muslims follow the Hanafi school of Sunni Islam.

== Religious identification ==
Religions of Uzbekistan 2020 by ARDA
Religions	percent
Islam	94.78%
Irreligion and other religions	3.89%
Christianity	1.04%

According to WIN-Gallup International's 2012 Global Index of Religiosity and Atheism, 79% of the respondents from Uzbekistan who took part in the survey considered themselves religious people, another 16% stated they were not religious, 2% convinced atheists and 3% had checked no response box.

As of 1 June 2019, there were 2,286 registered religious organisations from 16 different confessions.

In total, 2098 mosques and Islamic organizations, 160 churches, and 28 other religious organizations

	Churches, religious schools and centres	N
1	Islam	2098
2	Russian Orthodox Church	52
3	Korean Christian Church	37
4	Baptists	23
5	Pentecostalism	21
6	Seventh-day Adventist Church	10
7	Judaism	8
8	Baháʼí Faith	7
9	Roman Catholic Church	5
10	New Apostolic Church	4
11	Lutheranism	2
12	Armenian Apostolic Church	2
13	Jehovah's Witnesses	1
14	Krishna Consciousness	1
15	Buddhism	1
16	Church of Voice of God	1
17	Bible Society	1
18	Uzbekistan Zoroastrian Anjuman	1

== History ==
State atheism was an official policy in the Soviet Union and other Marxist-Leninist states. The Soviet Union used the term gosateizm, a syllabic abbreviation of "state" (gosudarstvo) and "atheism" (ateizm), to refer to a policy of expropriation of religious property, publication of information against religion and the official promotion of anti-religious materials in the education system. By the late 1980s, the Soviets had succeeded in curtailing religion in Uzbekistan by removing its outward manifestations: closing mosques and madrasas; banning religious text and literature; outlawing non-state-sanctioned religious leaders and congregations.

Today Uzbekistan is a secular country. Article 61 of the constitution states that religious organizations and associations are separate from the state and equal before law. According to the constitution, there is no state interference in the activity of religious associations.

In the early 1990s, when Soviet dominion came to an end, groups of Islamic missionaries, mostly from Saudi Arabia and Turkey, arrived in Uzbekistan to preach Sufi and Wahhabi interpretations of Islam.

In 1992, in the town of Namangan, a group of radical Islamists educated at Islamic universities in Saudi Arabia took control of a government building and demanded that president Karimov declare an Islamic state in Uzbekistan and introduce Shari‛a as the only legal system.

The regime, however, prevailed, and eventually struck down hard on the Islamic militant groups, leaders of which later fled to Afghanistan and Pakistan and were later killed in fights against coalition forces. In 1992 and 1993 around 50 missionaries from Saudi Arabia were expelled from the country. The Sufi missionaries too were forced to end their activities in the country.

== Islam ==
There are more Sunni than Shia Muslims among the residents. Islam was brought to the ancestors of modern Uzbeks during the eighth century when the Arabs conquered Central Asia. Islam initially took hold in the southern portions of Turkestan and thereafter gradually spread northward. Islamic customs were broadly adopted by the ruling elite, and they began patronage of scholars and conquerors such as Muhammad al-Bukhari, Al-Tirmidhi, al-Biruni, Avicenna, Tamerlane, Ulugh Begh, and Babur. In the 14th century, Tamerlane constructed many religious structures, including the Bibi-Khanym Mosque. He also constructed one of his finest buildings at the tomb of Ahmed Yesevi, an influential Turkic Sufi saint who spread Sufism among the nomads. Islam also spread amongst the Uzbeks with the conversion of Uzbeg Khan. He was converted to Islam by the influence of Ibn Abdul Hamid, a Bukharan sayyid and sheikh of the Yasavi order. Uzbeg promoted Islam amongst the Golden Horde and fostered Muslim missionary work to expand across Central Asia. In the long run, Islam enabled the khan to eliminate interfactional struggles in the Horde and to stabilize state institutions.

During the Soviet era, Moscow greatly distorted the understanding of Islam among Uzbekistan's population and created competing Islamic ideologies among the Central Asians themselves. The government sponsored official anti-religious campaigns and severe crackdowns on any hint of an Islamic movement or network outside of the control of the state. Moreover, many Muslims were subjected to intense Russification. In Uzbekistan the end of Soviet power did not bring an upsurge of Islamic fundamentalism, as many had predicted, but rather a religious revival among the population. Currently, according to a Pew Research Center report, Uzbekistan's population is 96.3% Muslim.

== Christianity ==
Prior to the advent of Islam, present-day Uzbekistan had communities of Eastern Christians, including Assyrians (historically associated with Nestorianism; also includes Jacobites, which itself historically associated with miaphysitism). Between the 7th and the 14th centuries Nestorian communities were established, through an extraordinary missionary effort, in the territory of present-day Uzbekistan.

Major Christian centres emerged in Bukhara and Samarkand. Amongst artifacts that have been discovered in Central Asia, many coins with crosses on them have been recovered from around Bukhara, mostly dating from the late seventh or early eighth centuries. In fact, more coins with Christian symbols have been found near Bukhara than anywhere else in Central Asia, prompting the suggestion that Christianity was the religion of the ruling dynasty or even state religion in the principality where this coinage was issued. Several dates for the appointment of the first bishop in Samarkand are given, including the patriarchates of Ahai (410–415), Shila (505–523), Yeshuyab II (628–643) and Saliba-Zakha (712–728).

During this time prior to the Arab invasion, Christianity had become, next to Zoroastrianism, the second most powerful religious force in the territory. Marco Polo, who arrived in Khanbaliq in 1275, met Nestorians in many different places on his journeys, including Central Asia.

Polo describes the building of a great church dedicated to John the Baptist in Samarkand that was erected to celebrate the conversion of the Chaghatayid khan to Christianity. After Arab invasion, Nestorians were required to pay a poll tax levied in exchange for the privilege of maintaining their religion, were prohibited from building new churches and displaying the cross in public.

As a result of these and other restrictions, some Christians converted to Islam. Other factors included the plague that swept through at least the Yeti Su area around 1338–1339, that probably wiped out much of the Christian community there, and the economic advantages of conversion to Islam for those involved in trade, since the Silk Road trade by this time was almost entirely in the hands of Muslims. Furthermore, Ruy Gonzalez de Clavijo, the Spanish ambassador to Timur's court, mentions Nestorian Christians, Jacobite Christians, Armenian Christians and Greek Christians in Samarkand in 1404. However, subsequent persecution during the rule of Timur's grandson Ulugh Beg (1409–1449) resulted in this remnant being completely wiped out.

After the Russian invasion of 1867, Christian Orthodoxy arrived in the region, with churches built in large cities, to serve Russian and European settlers and officers. Today most of the Christians in Uzbekistan are ethnic Russians who practice Eastern Orthodox Christianity.

There are also communities of Roman Catholics, mostly ethnic Poles, Croatians, Hungarians and Slovenians. The Catholic Church in Uzbekistan is under the spiritual leadership of the Pope in Rome. Various religious orders such as the Franciscans and Mother Teresa's Missionaries of Charity have a presence in the country and assist in activities such as caring for the poor, prisoners, and the sick.

	List of Catholic parishes in Uzbekistan
1	Roman Catholic Church of Sacred Heart Cathedral, Tashkent
2	Roman Catholic Church of St. John the Baptist, Samarkand
3	Roman Catholic Church of Holy Mary, Ferghana
4	Roman Catholic Church of St. Andrew Apostle, Bukhara
5	Roman Catholic Church of Holy Mary, Mother of Mercy, Urgench

Protestants are less than 1.5% of the population.

The Evangelical Lutheran Church in Uzbekistan has seven parishes and the seat of the bishop is in Tashkent. A 2015 study estimates some believers in Christ from a Muslim background in the country, most of them belonging to the evangelical or charismatic Protestant community.

== Judaism ==
The number of Jews in Uzbekistan in 2022 was estimated at 5,500 (approximately 3,500 Ashkenazi and fewer than 2,000 Bukharan Jews).

== Baháʼí Faith ==
The Baháʼí Faith in Uzbekistan began in the lifetime of Bahá'u'lláh, the founder of the religion. Circa 1918 there were an estimated 1900 Baháʼís in Tashkent. By the period of the Soviet policy of oppression of religion the communities shrank away – by 1963 in the entire USSR there were about 200 Baháʼís. Little is known of the period but the religion began to grow again in the 1980s. In 1991 a Baháʼí National Spiritual Assembly of the Soviet Union was elected but was quickly split among its former members. In 1994 the National Spiritual Assembly of Uzbekistan was elected. In 2008 eight Baháʼí Local Spiritual Assemblies or smaller groups had registered with the government though more recently there were also raids and expulsions.

== Hinduism ==
According to ARDA, there were 734 Hindus in Uzbekistan in 2010; by 2020, they reported 895 Hindus living in the country. Hare Krishna has one group registered in Uzbekistan.

== Buddhism ==
Many Buddhist relics have been found in the territory of present-day Uzbekistan, indicating the wide practice of the religion in ancient times. Most of the relics are found in the area called Bactria or Tokharestan, located in what is now southeast Uzbekistan near the borders with Tajikistan and Afghanistan (Termez, Surkhondaryo province).

== Zoroastrianism ==
The ancient pre-Islamic religion of Uzbekistan-Zoroastrianism is followed by 2,500 people in the country. Older estimates put the figure at 7,000 people.

== Atheism ==
According to WIN-Gallup International's 2012 Global Index of religiosity and atheism 2% of the respondents who took part in the survey were "convinced atheists".

== Freedom of religion ==
In 2023, the country was scored zero out of four for religious freedom; it was noted that the president has relaxed some laws since 2016. In the same year, it was ranked as the 21st worst country in the world to be a Christian.

== See also ==
- Demographics of Uzbekistan
