= Protestantism in Uzbekistan =

Protestants made up about 0.15% of the population of Uzbekistan in 2020.

The Evangelical Lutheran Church in Uzbekistan is a church of seven congregations. The seat of the bishop of Tashkent. The president of the synod is Gilda Raspopowa.

== Denominations ==
- Baptist Union in Uzbekistan
- German Evangelical Lutheran Church
- Korean Baptist Churches
- Korean Methodist Church
- Korean Presbyterian Church

== See also ==
- Religion in Uzbekistan
- Christianity in Uzbekistan
