= Catholic Church in Uzbekistan =

The Catholic Church in Uzbekistan is part of the worldwide Catholic Church, under the spiritual leadership of the Pope in Rome.

In 2020, there were approximately 4000 Catholics in the country of 27 million; this is a decrease of 20% from 2008. They are organized under a single Apostolic Administration of Uzbekistan (missionary pre-diocesan jurisdiction). The main church building is Sacred Heart Cathedral, located in Tashkent.

== Activities ==
Various religious orders such as the Franciscans and Mother Teresa's Missionaries of Charity have a presence in the country and assist in activities such as caring for the poor, prisoners, and the sick.

There are also attempts to introduce the Catholic charity group Caritas, but has so far been unsuccessful. All missionary and other efforts to convert people to Catholicism from other religions are barred by Uzbek law.

In 2020, there were 9 priests and 12 nuns serving 5 parishes. There are plans to open two more parishes.

== Ecumenical relations ==
Muslim-Christian relations in the country are positive. There are no official relations between the Catholic and Eastern Orthodox Churches in Uzbekistan, however, at the local level priests of the two communities are in dialogue. Relations between Armenian Apostolic Christians, Lutherans and local Catholic communities are positive.

== See also ==
- Religion in Uzbekistan
- Christianity in Uzbekistan
