= St. John the Baptist Church, Samarkand =

St. John the Baptist Church
- Avliyo Ioann Baptist cherkovi
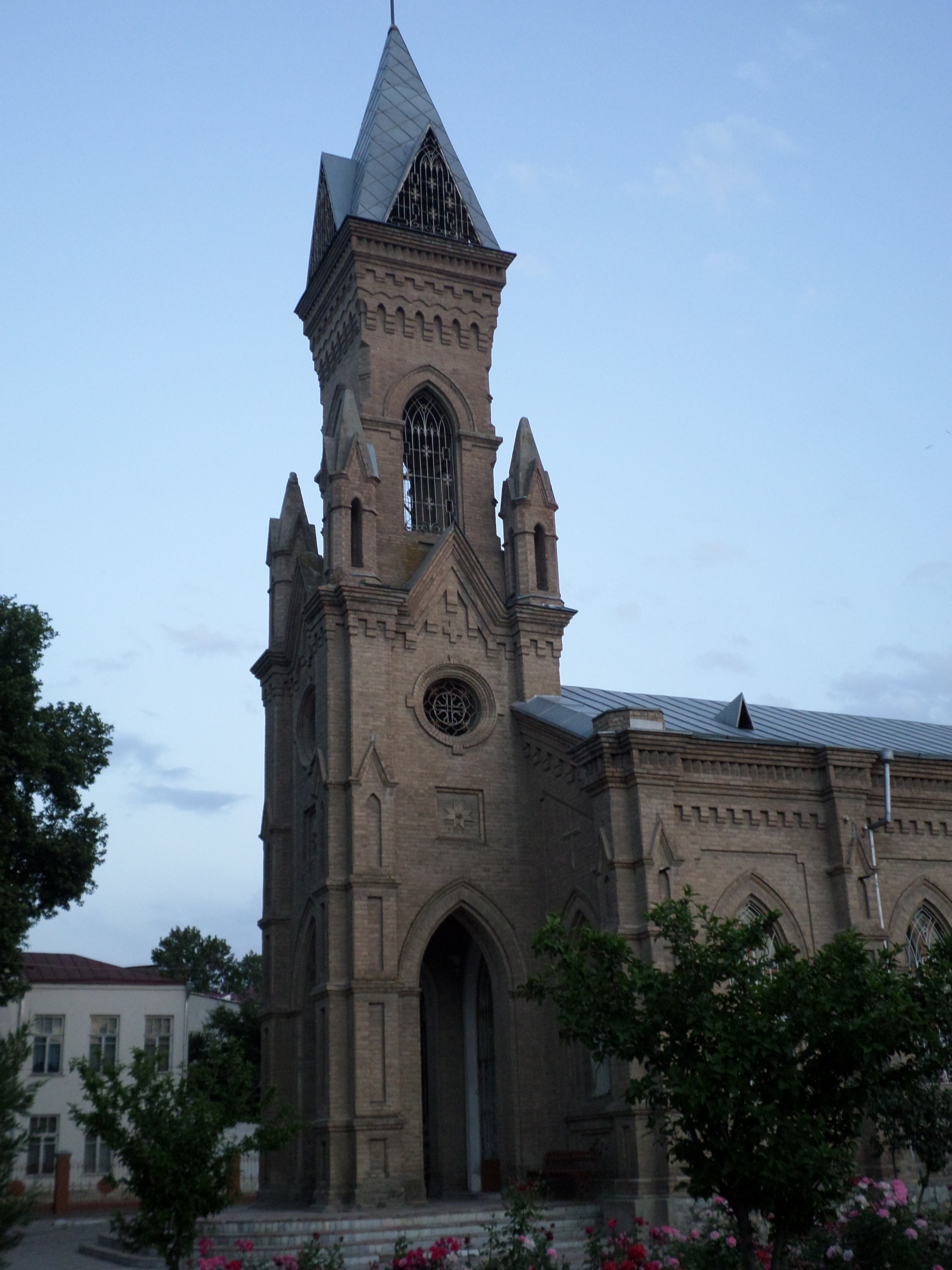
- St. John the Baptist Church
- 39.6464°N 66.9550°E
- Location: Samarkand
- Country: Uzbekistan
- Denomination: Roman Catholic Church

The St. John the Baptist Church is the only Catholic church in the city of Samarkand, Uzbekistan. It depends on the Apostolic Administration of Uzbekistan based in Tashkent.

== History ==
In the times of the Russian Empire in the nineteenth century a small Catholic minority in Samarkand formed by merchants and employees of Polish or German origin settled in the place. They asked permission to build a church in 1905, but were denied. In 1915 a number of Polish prisoners of war (originating in Poland, Prussia and Austria) were added, so it was possible that the Catholic community could build his church. They bought the land in the present street Makhmud Kochgari. Neo-Gothic church was built by architect Nelle - and was completed in 1916. It was closed by the authorities of the Uzbek Soviet Socialist Republic in 1930; to install a school.

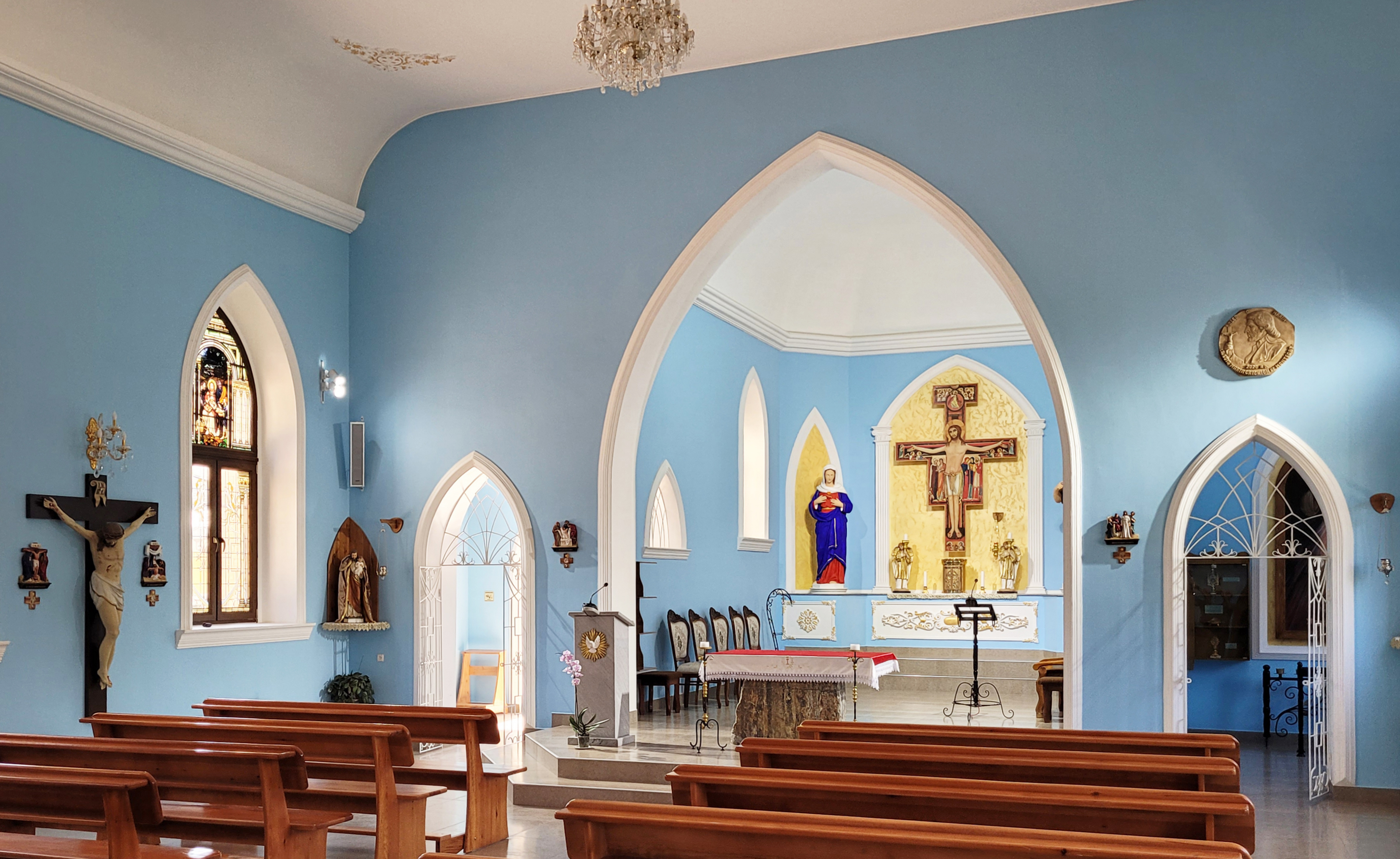
View of interior

In 1995, at the initiative of Father Ivan Rolloff the Catholic community of the city obtained permission to officially register and recover the building in 1997. After restoration work, the church is dedicated on March 27, 1999.

Today the community is run by a Polish priest, Father Luciano Szymanski assisted by two brothers of a Polish Franciscan monastery.

== See also ==
- Roman Catholicism in Uzbekistan
- St. John the Baptist Church (disambiguation)
- Poles in Uzbekistan
