= Poles in Tajikistan =

Polish diaspora in Tajikistan

Total population
- 23 (2010, census)

Religion
- Roman Catholicism

Related ethnic groups
- Poles in Kazakhstan, Poles in Kyrgyzstan, Poles in Turkmenistan, Poles in Uzbekistan

Poles in Tajikistan form a small population, part of the Polish diaspora in Central Asia.

== History ==
Following the joint German-Soviet invasion of Poland, which started World War II in 1939, the Tajik Soviet Socialist Republic was one of the destinations for the deportations of Poles from Soviet-occupied eastern Poland. An estimated 5,000 to 12,000 Poles were deported to Tajikistan in 1939−1941, a third of which died to epidemics. Many were evacuated along with the Polish Anders' Army to Iran in 1942. As of 1943, there were 2,121 Polish citizens in Tajikistan, according to Soviet data. After the war, over 4,500 Poles were repatriated from the Tajik SSR to Poland in 1946–1948. Several hundred Poles still lived in Tajikistan in the following decades, according to official census data.

Due to Soviet persecution of religion, Catholic services were held in secret. Clandestine services for Catholics were conducted by visiting Polish priests from Kazakhstan in 1954–1972. In 1976, Polish priest Józef Świdnicki received temporary permission to work in Dushanbe, and the following year, thanks to his efforts, the first Catholic parish was registered in Tajikistan, however, in 1982, he was expelled from Tajikistan.

Most remaining Poles fled from Tajikistan during the Tajikistani Civil War in the 1990s. Very few remained, yet the Mazurek organization of Poles was active in the 2010s.

== Demographics ==
Historical population
Year	Pop.	±%
1926	65	—
1939	583	+796.9%
1959	681	+16.8%
1970	776	+14.0%
1979	852	+9.8%
1989	716	−16.0%
2000	74	−89.7%
2010	23	−68.9%

== See also ==
- Poland–Tajikistan relations
- Polish diaspora
- Demographics of Tajikistan
