= Uzbeks in Poland =

Polshadagi o'zbeklar Uzbecy w Polsce

Total population
- ca. 21,000–28,000

Languages
- Uzbek, Russian, Polish

Religion
- Islam

Related ethnic groups
- Uzbeks

Uzbeks in Poland (Uzbek: Polshadagi o'zbeklar; Polish: Uzbecy w Polsce) are people of Uzbek ethnicity or citizens of Uzbekistan who live in Poland. The Uzbek community in Poland has experienced significant growth in recent years, evolving from a modest presence to a notable demographic group. As of 2024, approximately 21,000 Uzbek nationals reside in Poland, encompassing both students and labor migrants.

== Historical context ==
Poland and Uzbekistan share significant historical parallels, having both been under Russian rule and later influenced by the Soviet Union. Territories of both countries were part of the Russian Empire until early 20th century, and while Uzbekistan became a Soviet republic within the USSR in 1924, Poland, after World War II, remained an officially independent state but was under strong Soviet influence as a member of the Warsaw Pact. Until the late 1980s, both countries were within the Soviet sphere, shaped by its political and economic system, though with different formal statuses.

The first significant migration between Poland and Uzbekistan occurred in the late 19th century when thousands of Polish political prisoners were exiled to the territory of the modern-day Uzbekistan following the partitions of Poland under Russian rule.

During World War II, approximately 100,000 Poles were either evacuated or deported from the Soviet-occupied eastern regions of Poland to Uzbekistan, contributing to the establishment of a Polish community in the region. However, throughout the 20th century, migration between the two countries remained largely one-directional, with little to no Uzbek migration to Poland.

== Current migration trends ==
Since joining the European Union and experiencing significant economic growth, Poland has become an attractive destination for labor migrants from former Soviet states. However, migration from Uzbekistan began to increase notably only in the late 2010s and early 2020s. According to Poland's Digital Affairs Ministry, over 21,000 Uzbek nationals have been granted Polish national identification numbers (PESEL) since 2014. While only 50 Uzbeks received PESEL numbers in 2016, the figure rose to more than 6,000 in 2023.

In addition, Poland issued over more than 27,000 work permits to Uzbek citizens in 2023, making it the most popular destination for Uzbek labor migrants within the European Union.

== See also ==
- Poland–Uzbekistan relations
- Uzbek diaspora
- Immigration to Poland
- Poles in Uzbekistan
