= Sacred Heart Cathedral, Tashkent =

Coordinates: 41.3056°N 69.2958°E

Sacred Heart Cathedral
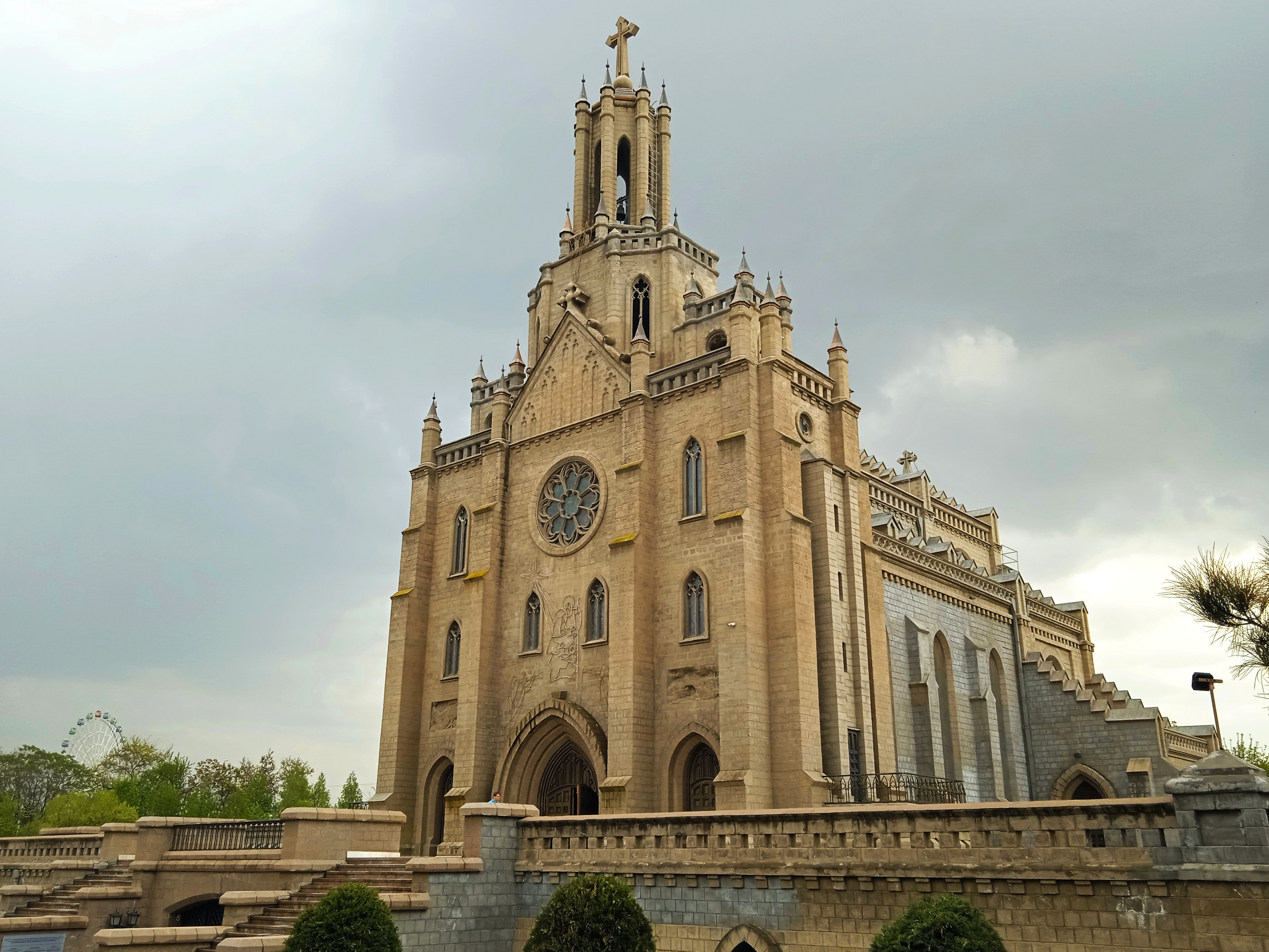
- The Sacred Heart Cathedral
- Sacred Heart Cathedral
- Location: Tashkent
- Country: Uzbekistan
- Denomination: Roman Catholic Church

History
- Founded: twentieth century

The Sacred Heart Cathedral (formally the Cathedral of the Sacred Heart of Jesus, sometimes also known as the Polish Church) is a religious building belonging to the Roman Catholic Church, located at the street Sadiq Asimov, Tashkent, the capital of Uzbekistan.

It is a relatively new structure that was built in the early twentieth century. It is decorated with stained glass windows, small towers on the roof and an arched doorway. It has a living room and a library, named in honor of Pope John Paul II.

== Gallery ==
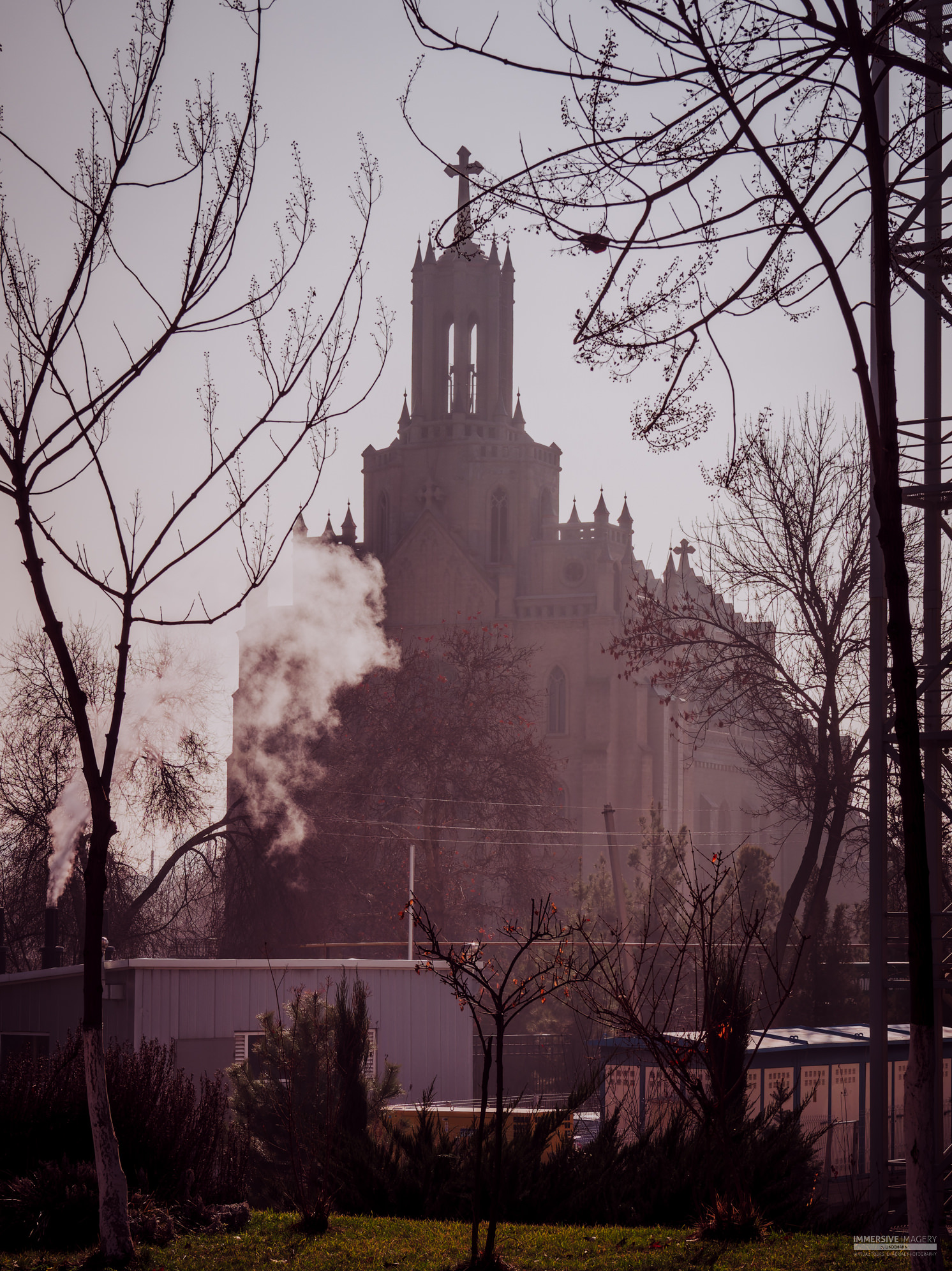

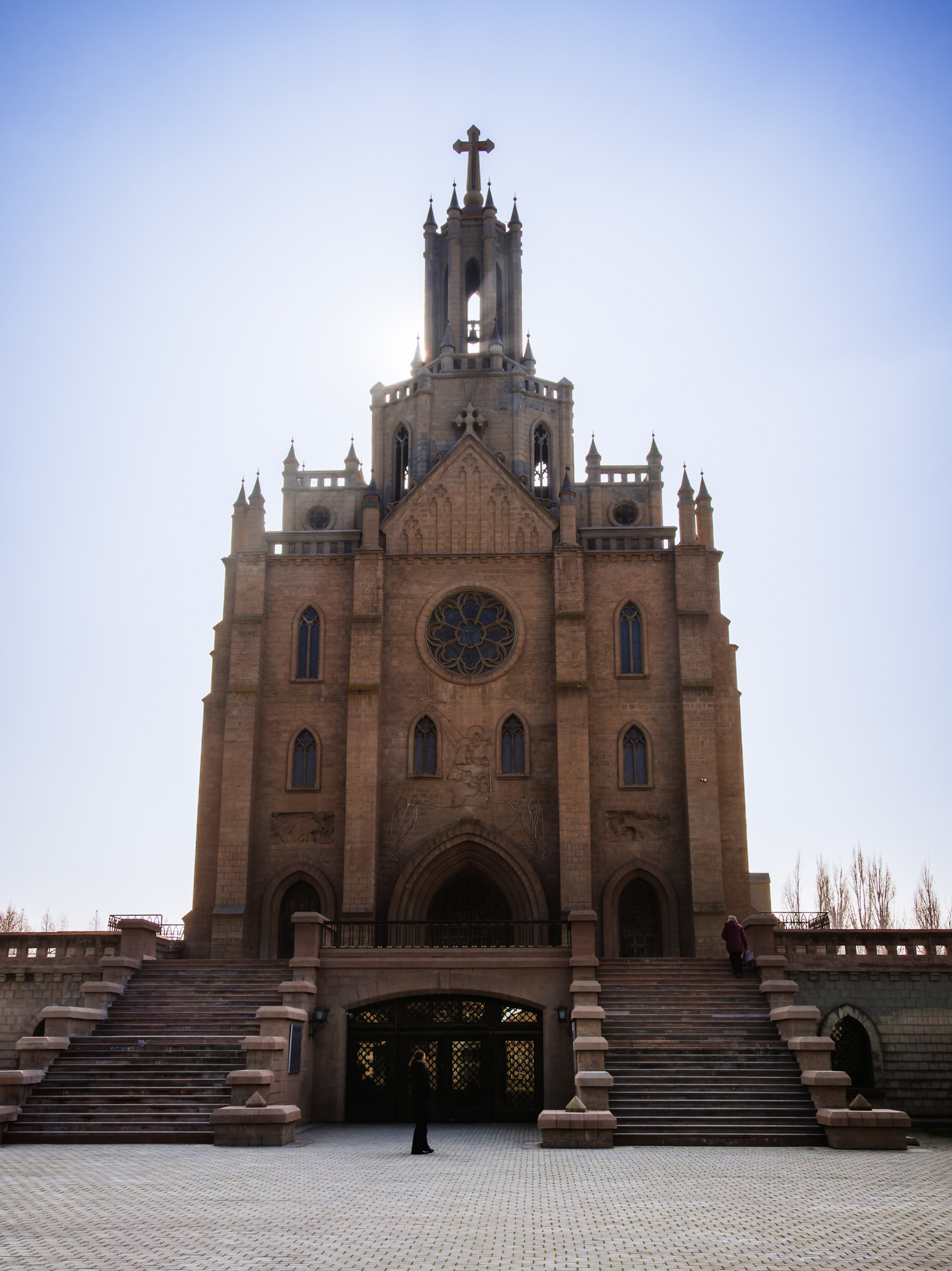

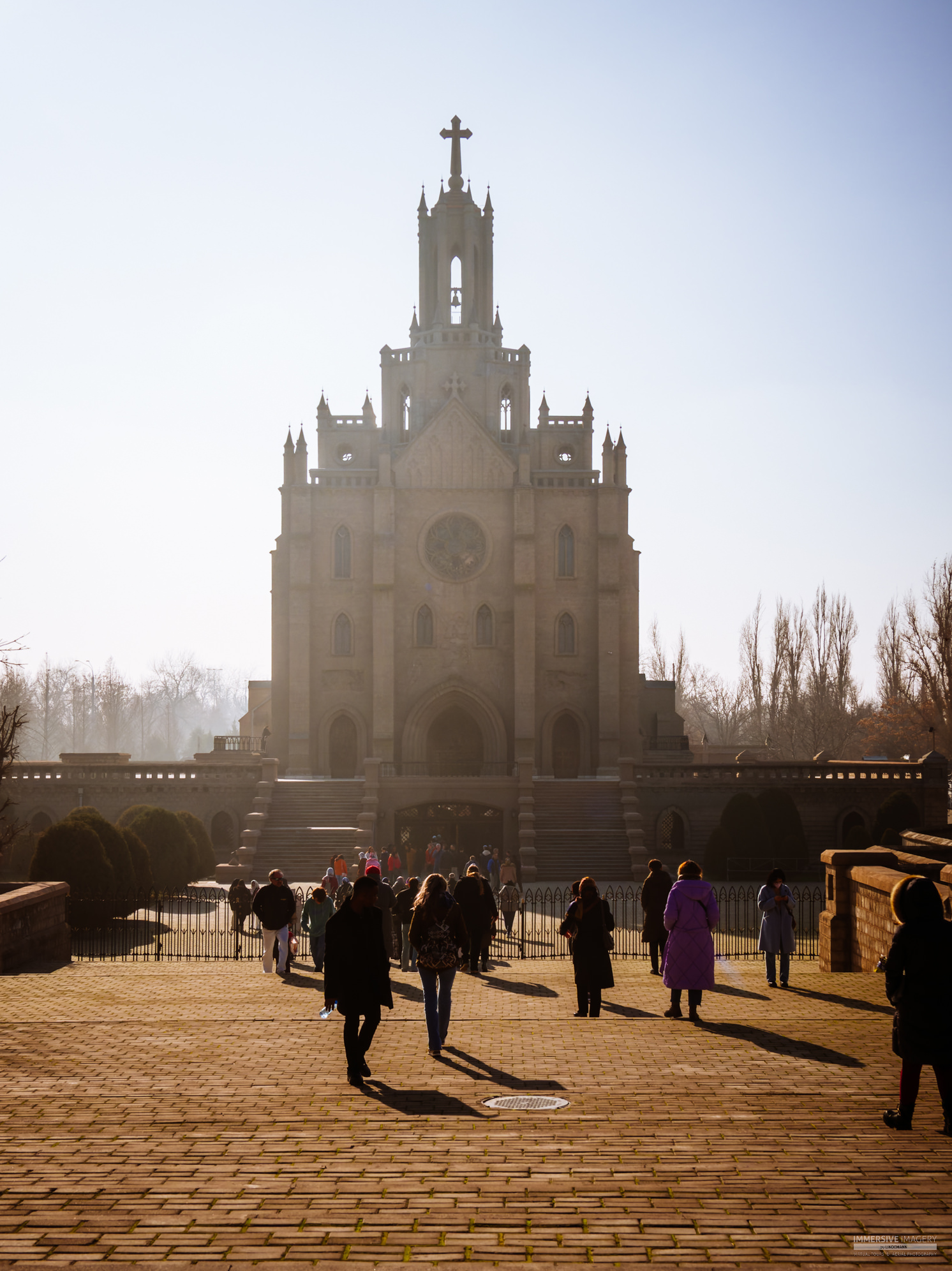

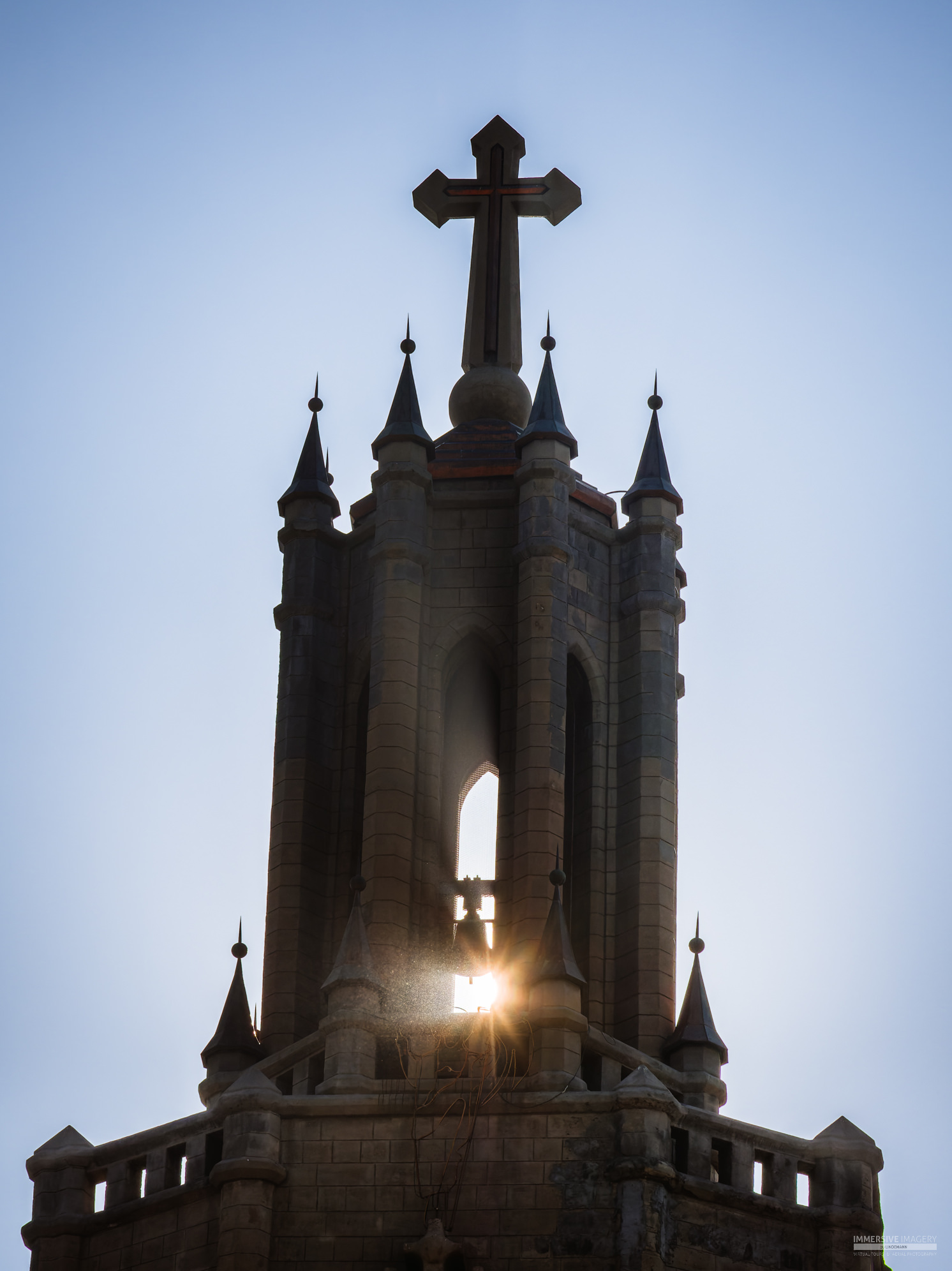

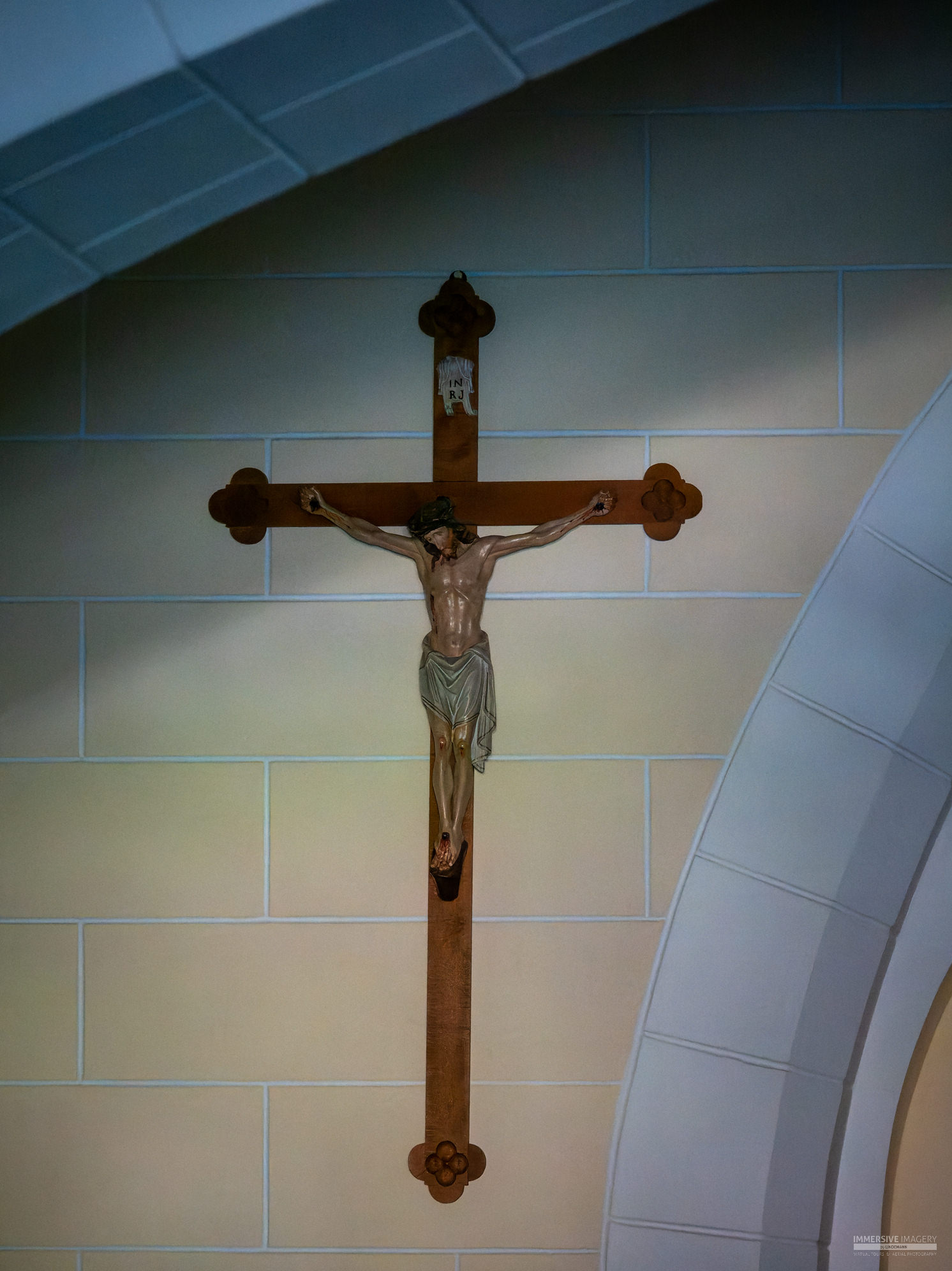

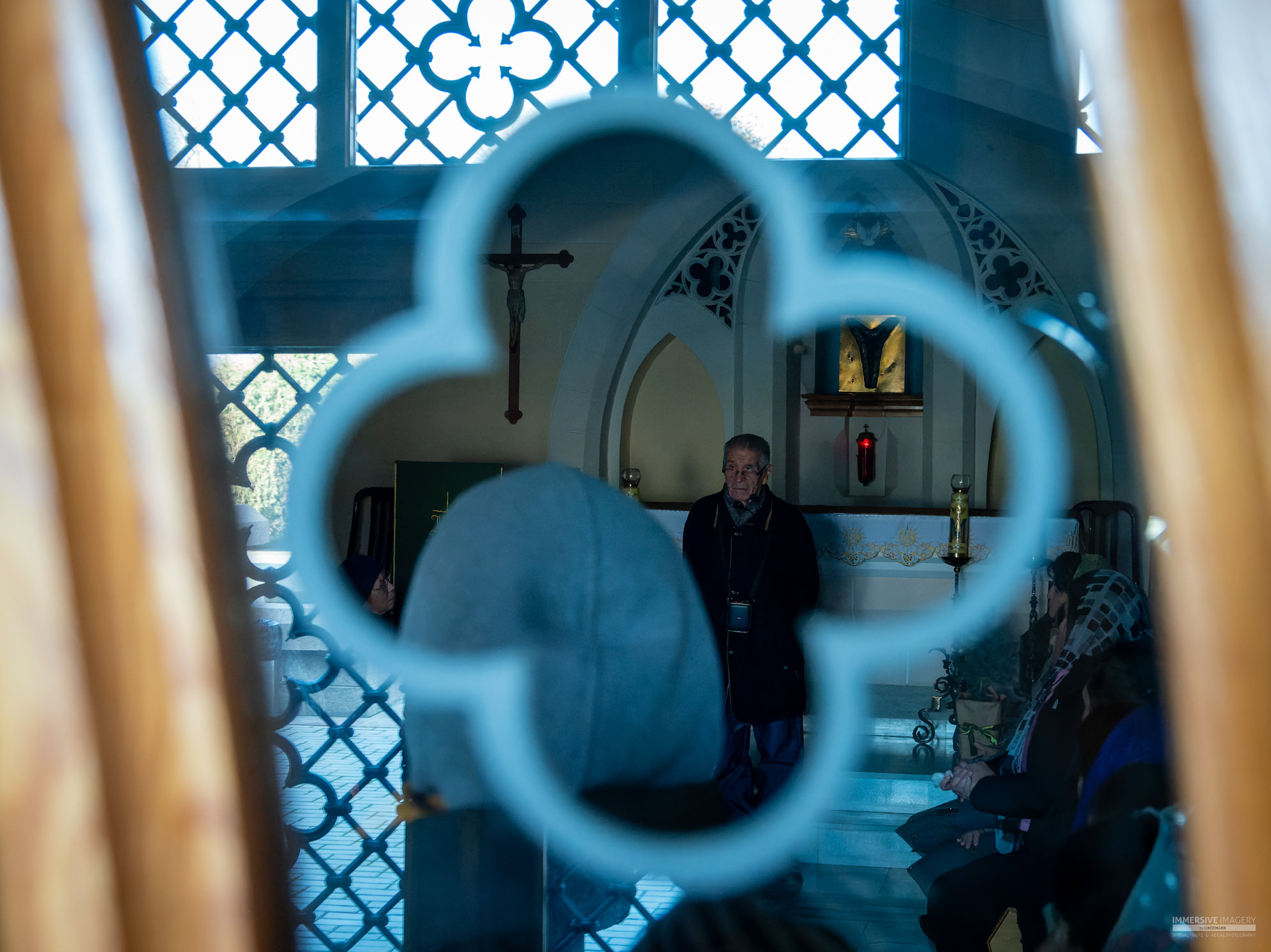

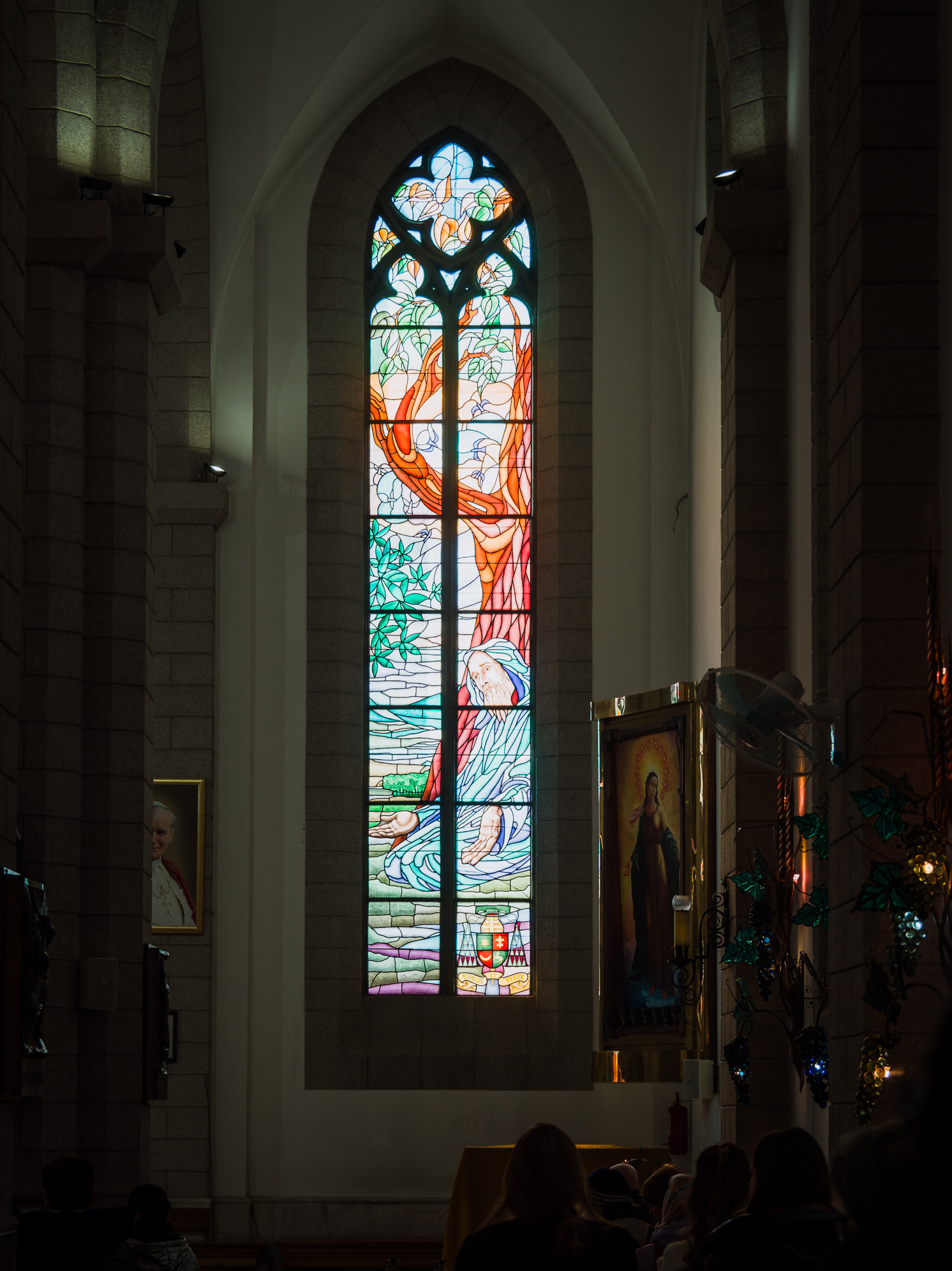

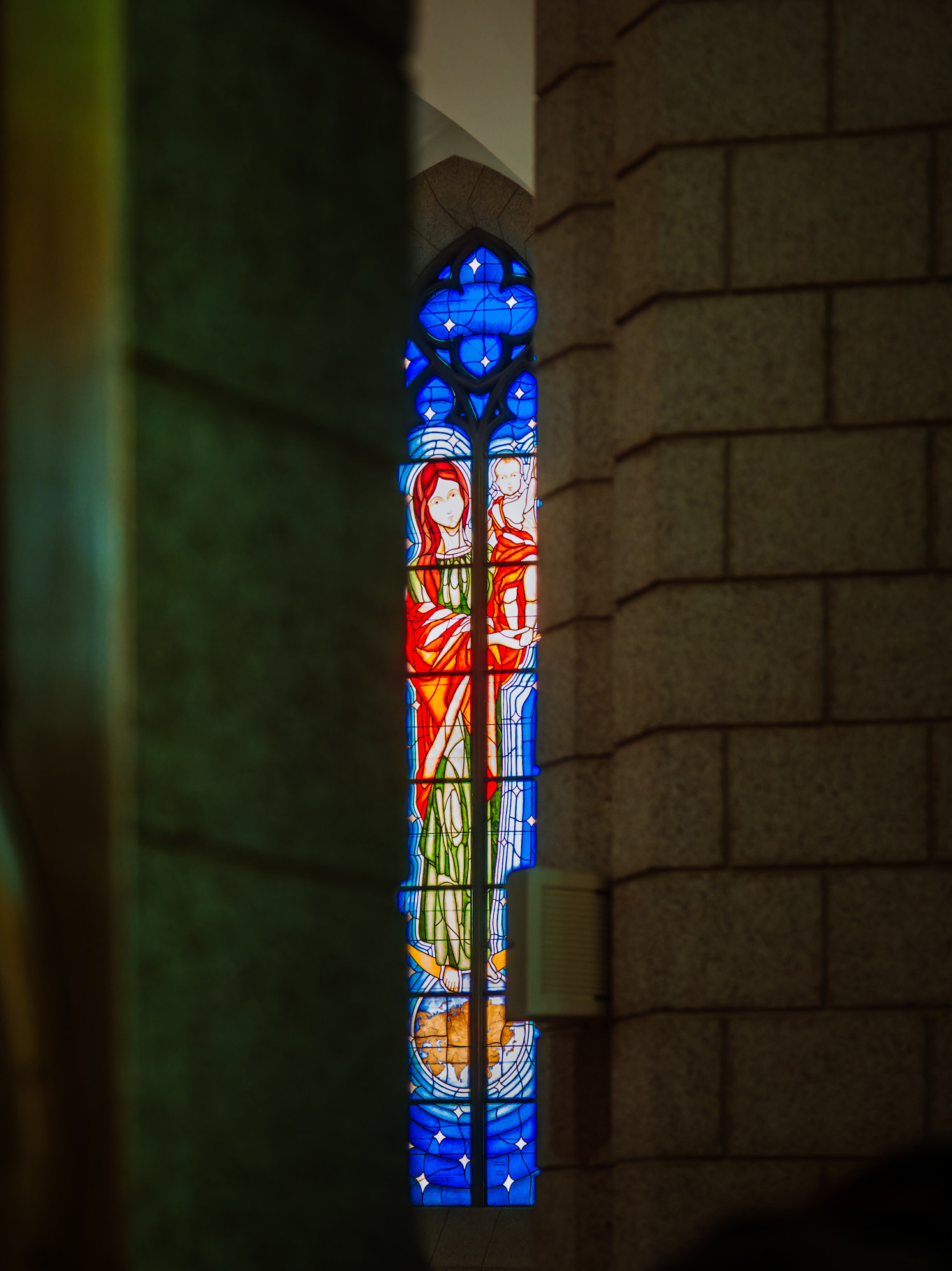

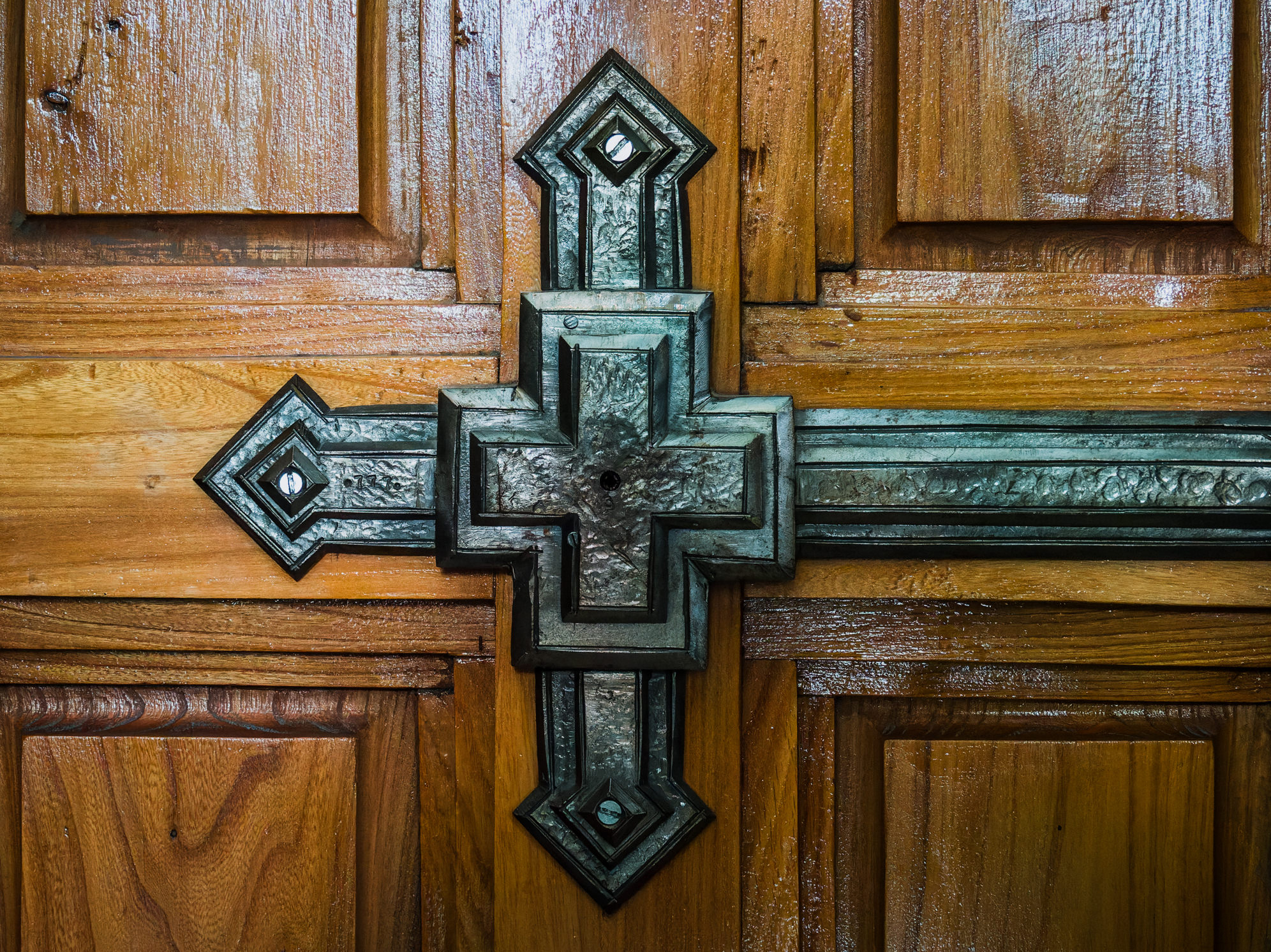

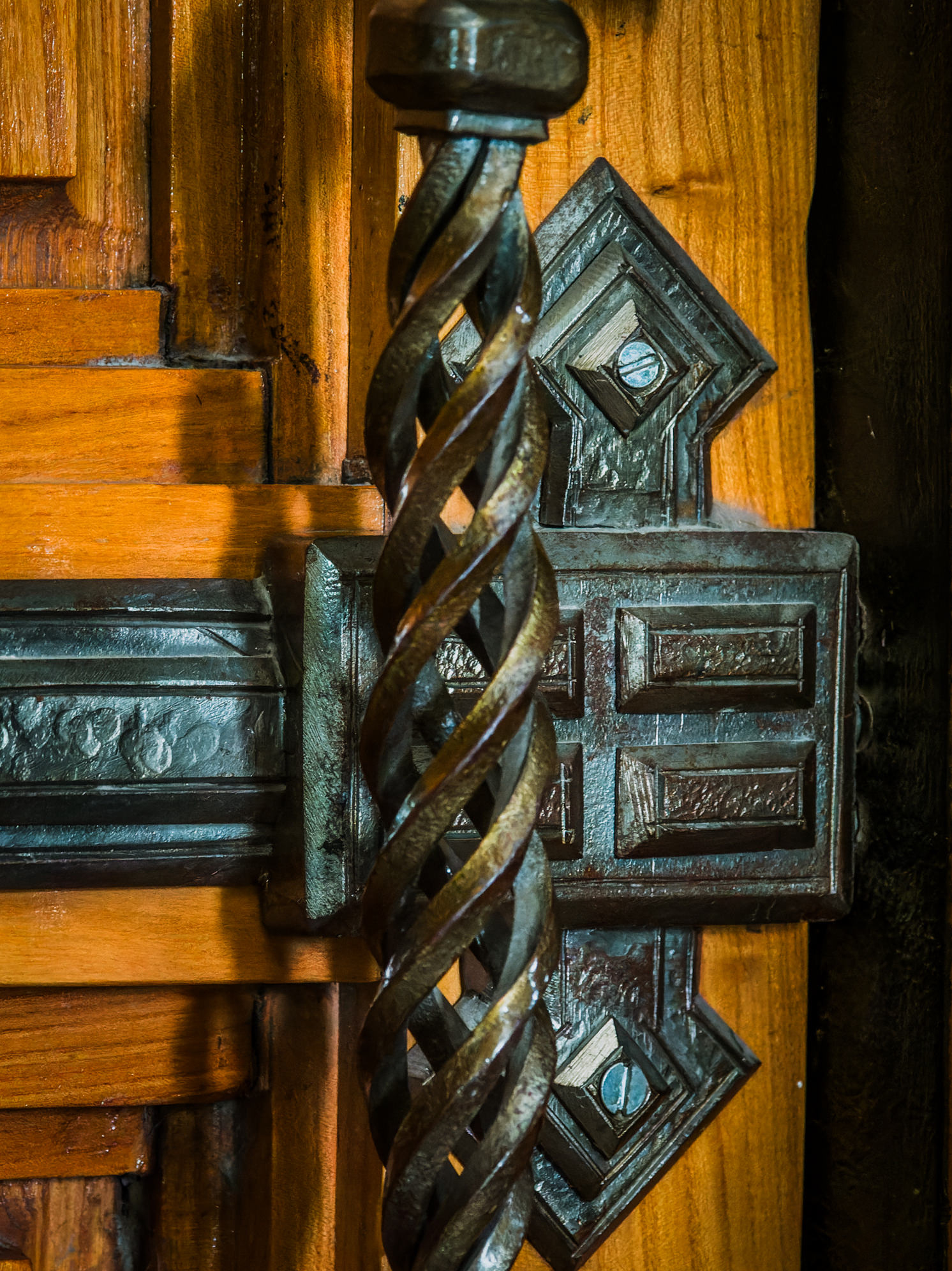

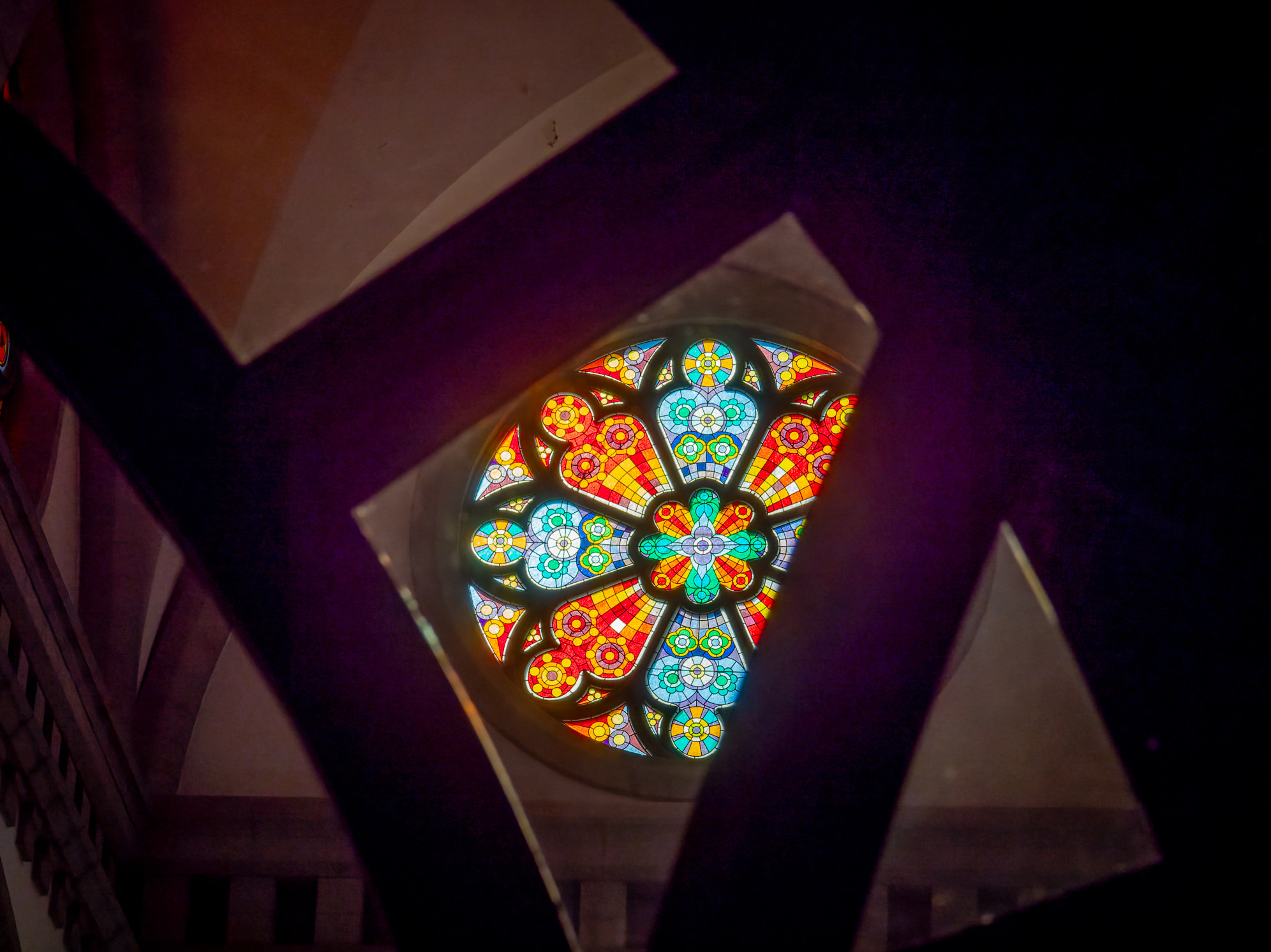

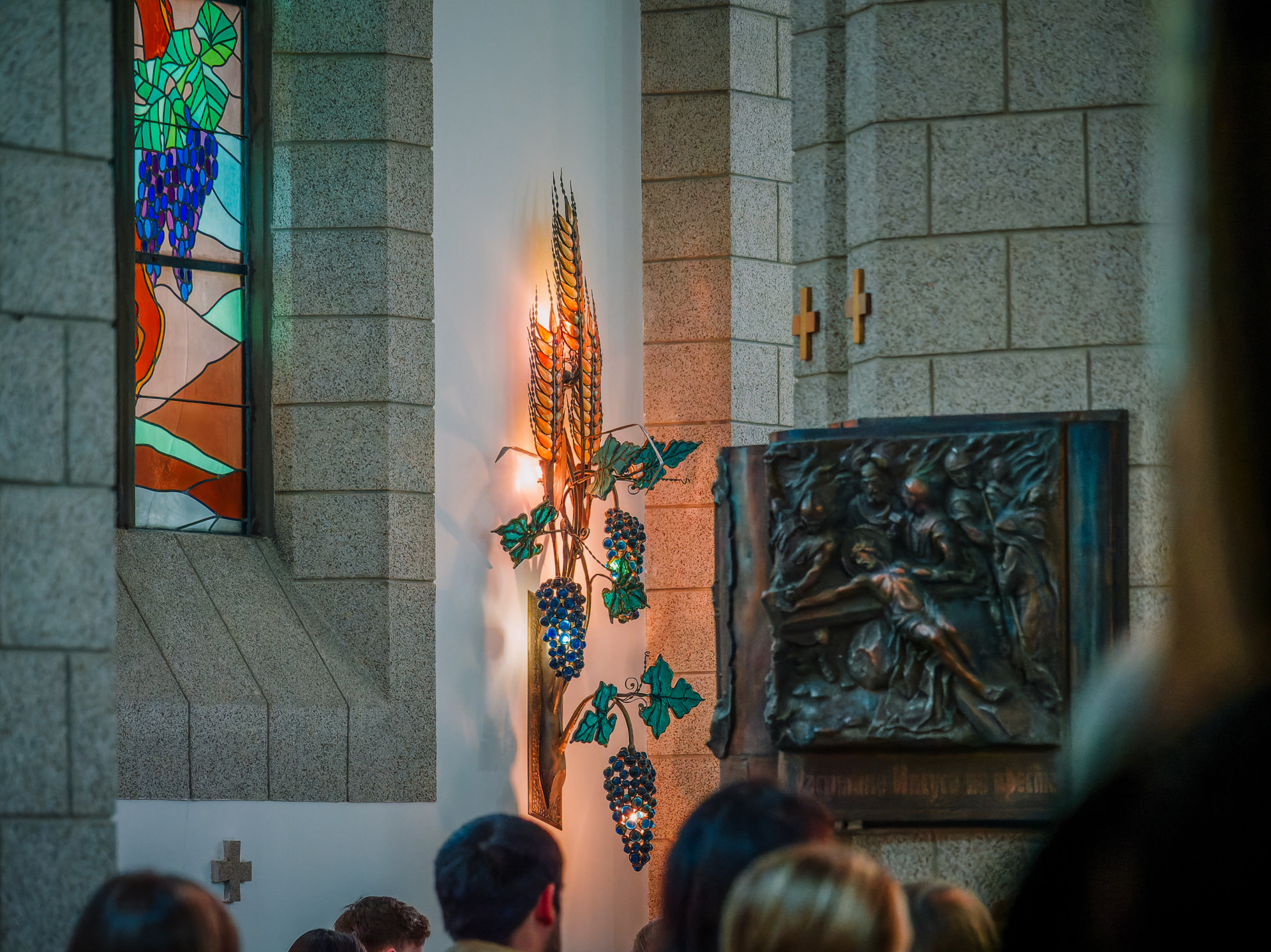

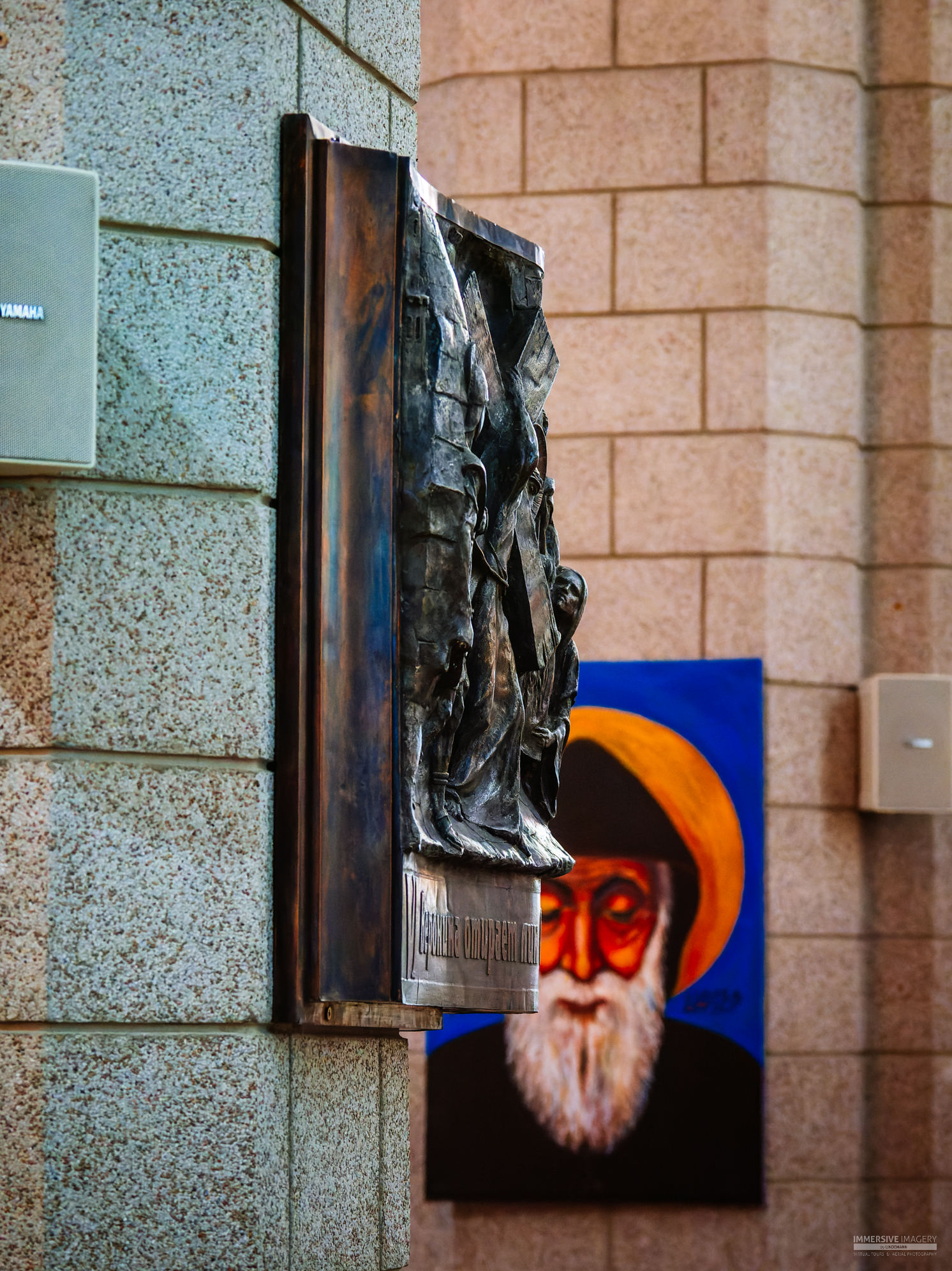

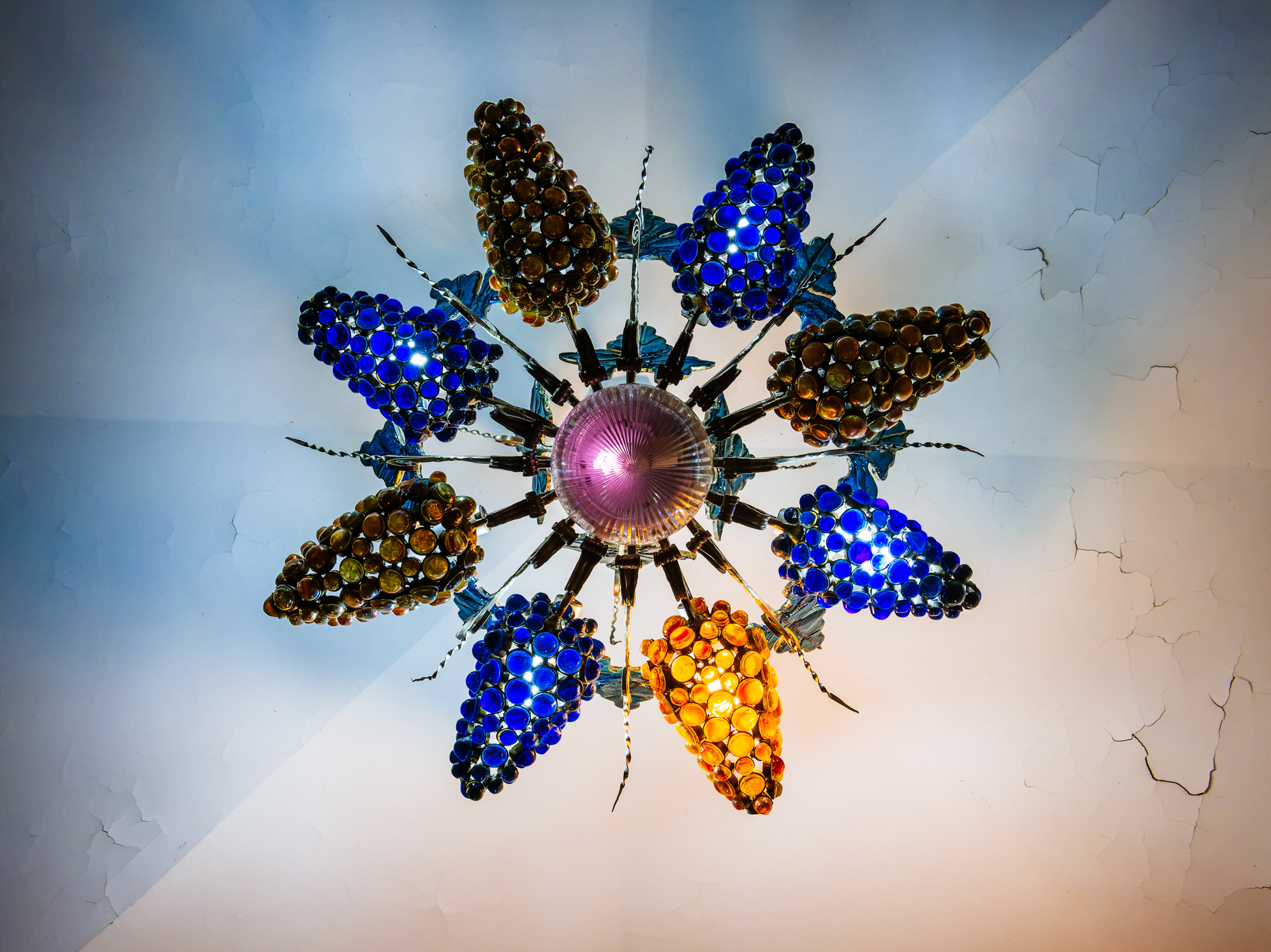

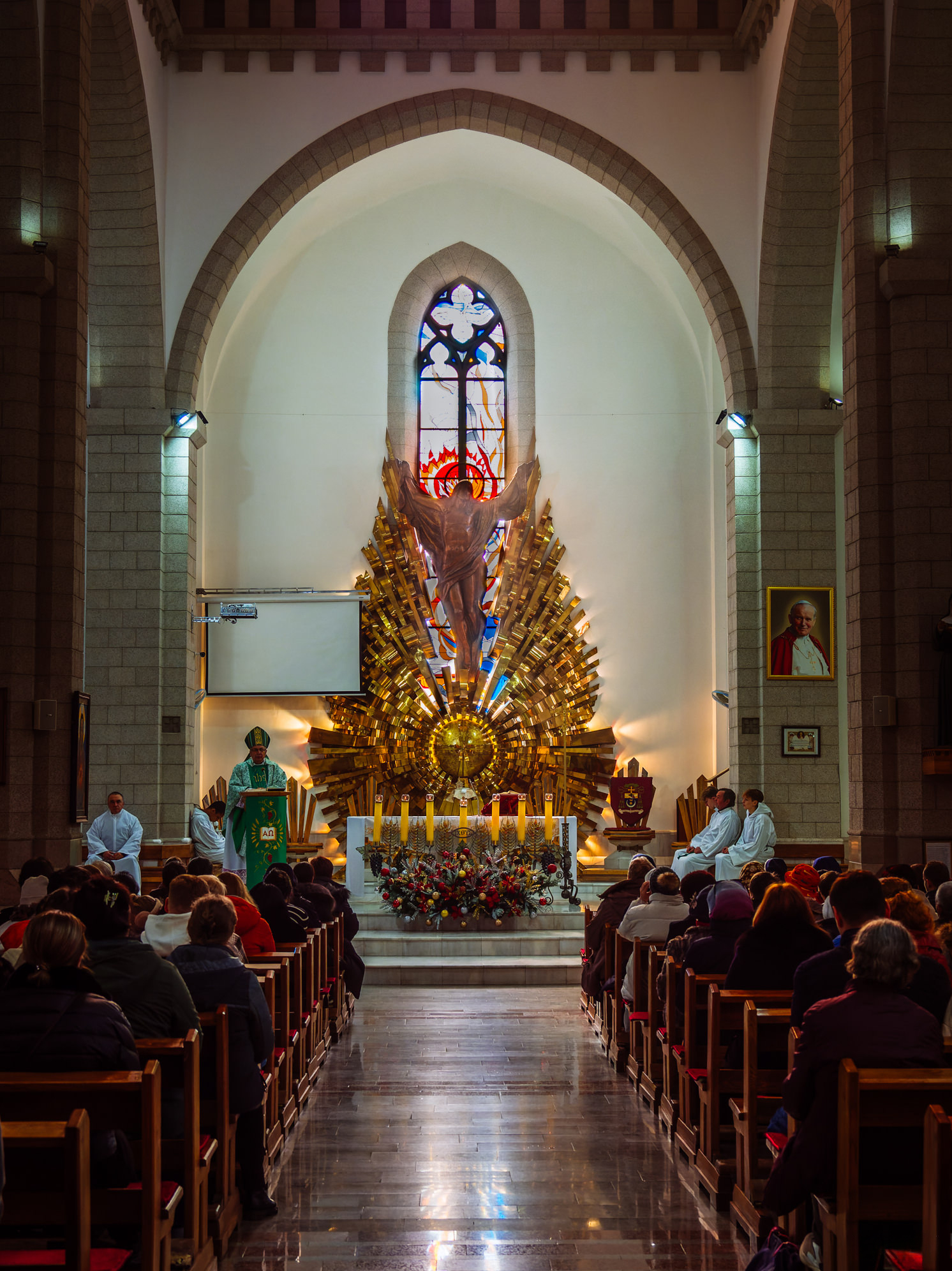

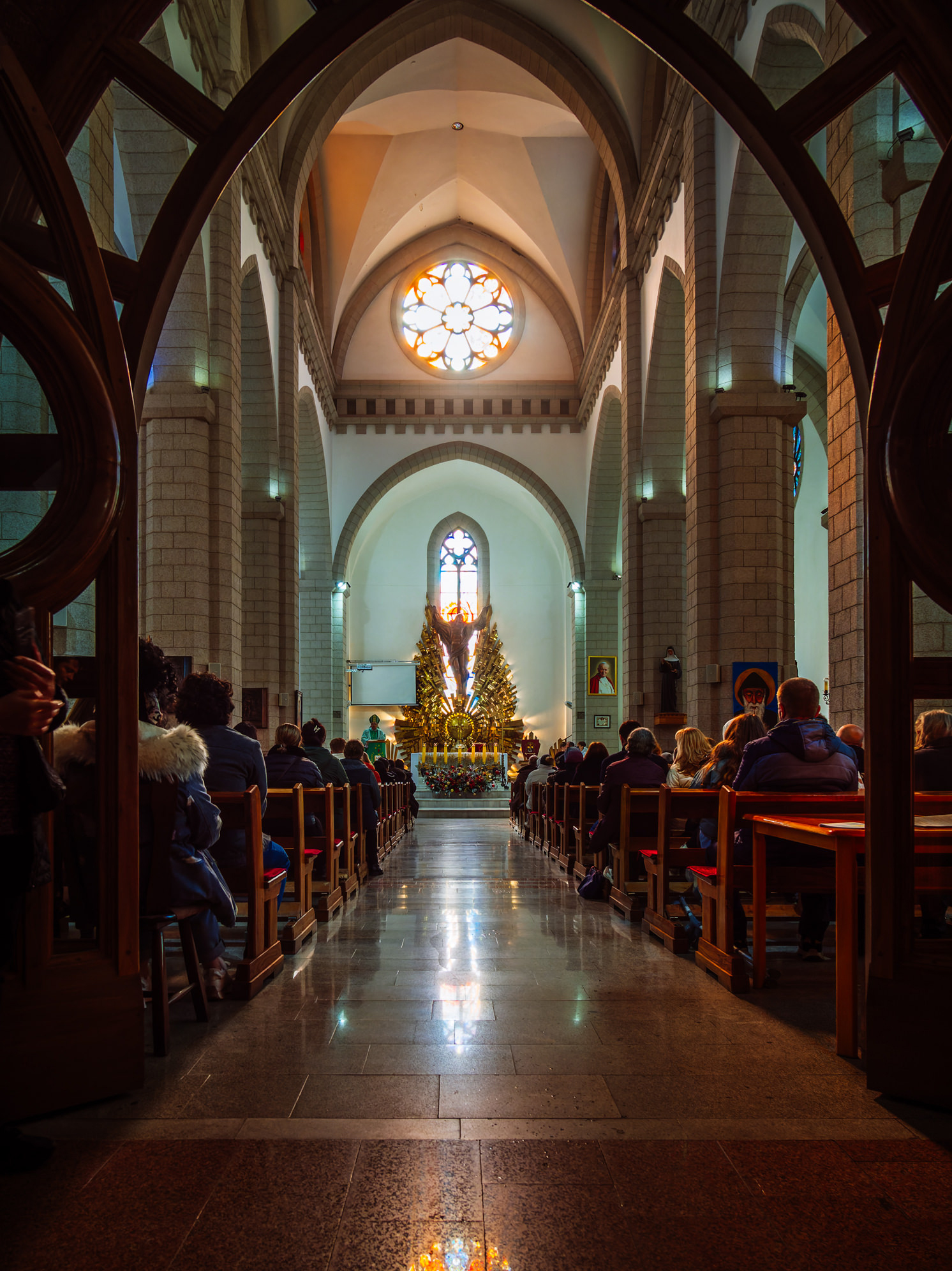

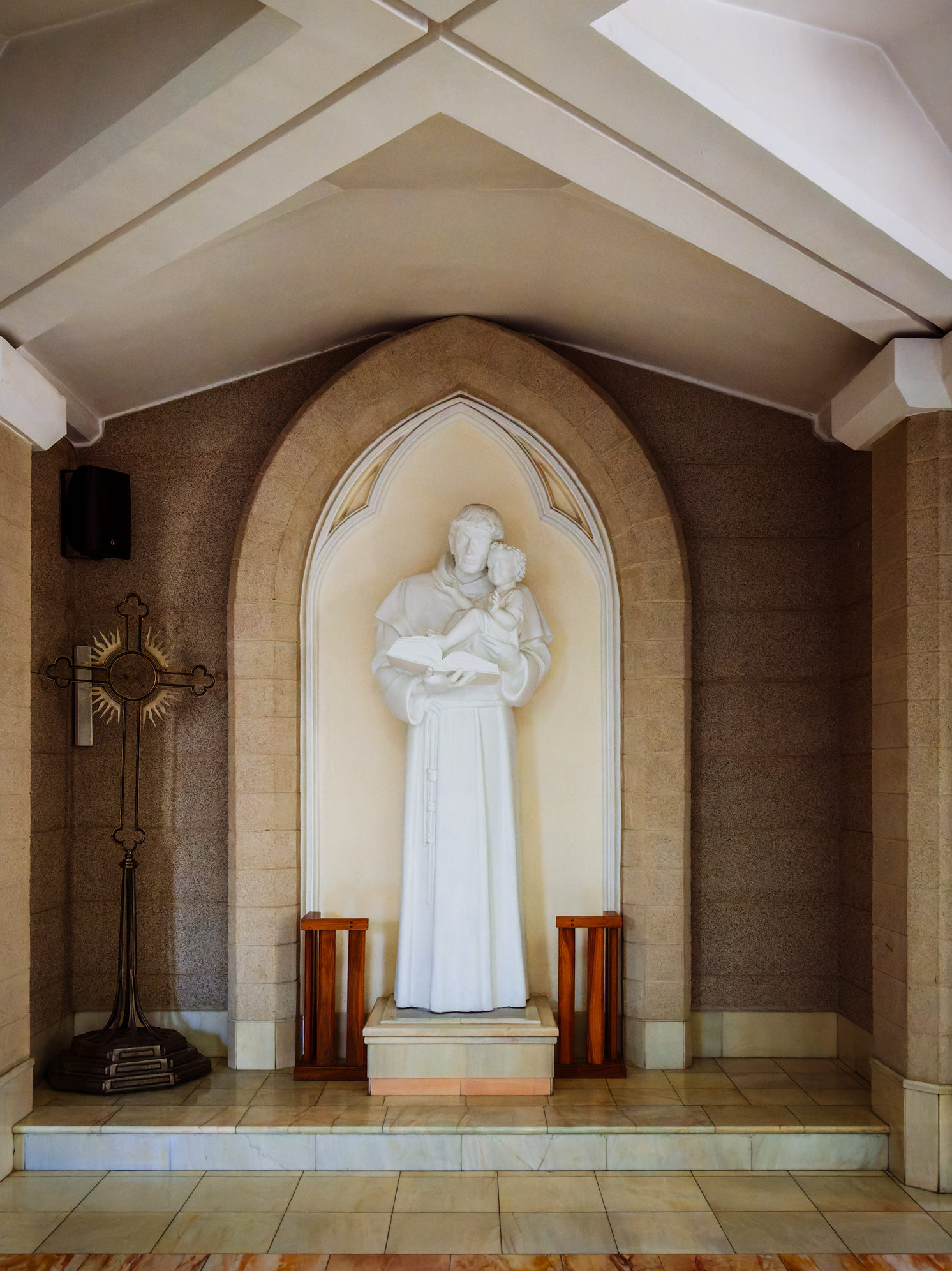

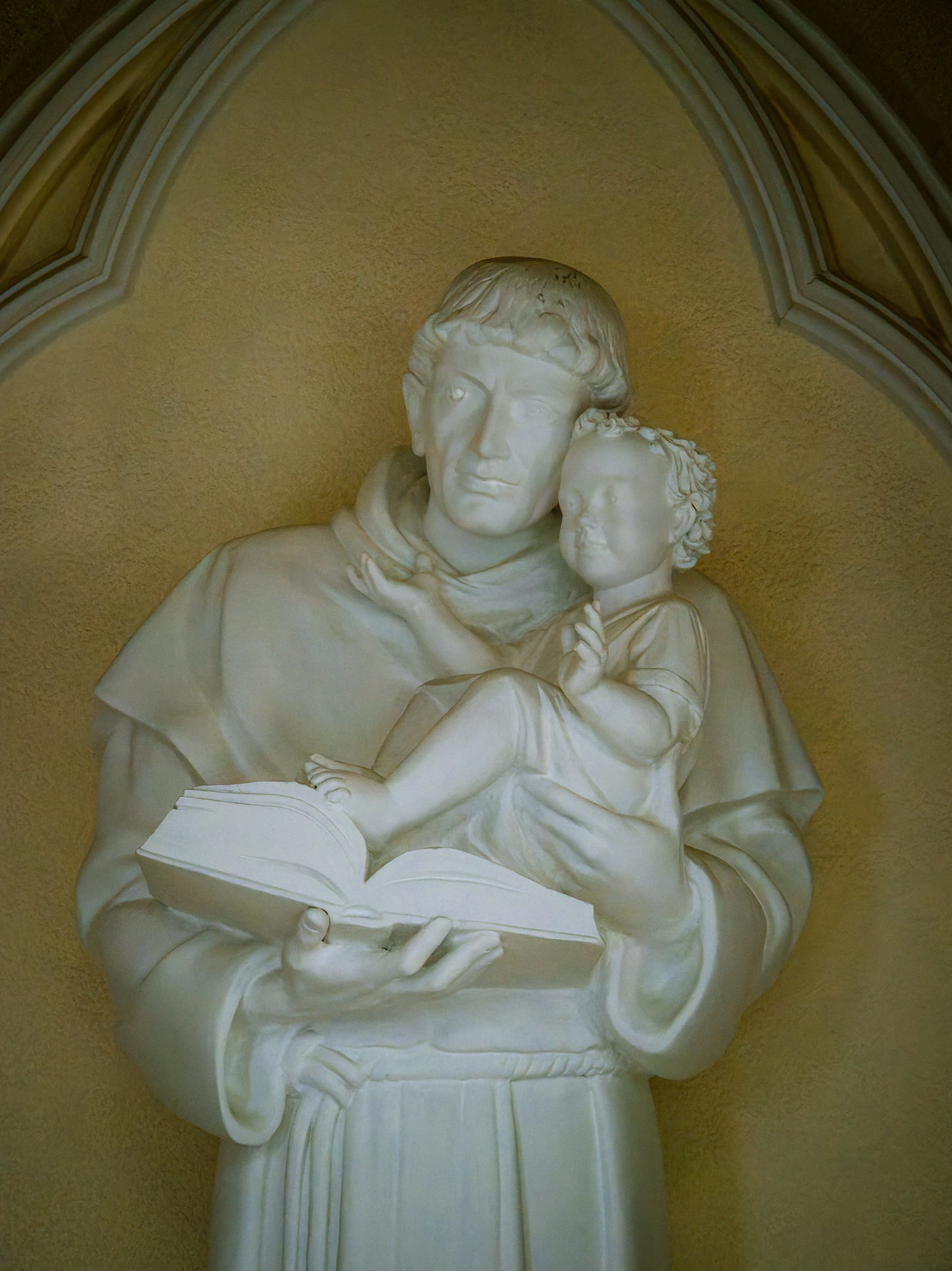

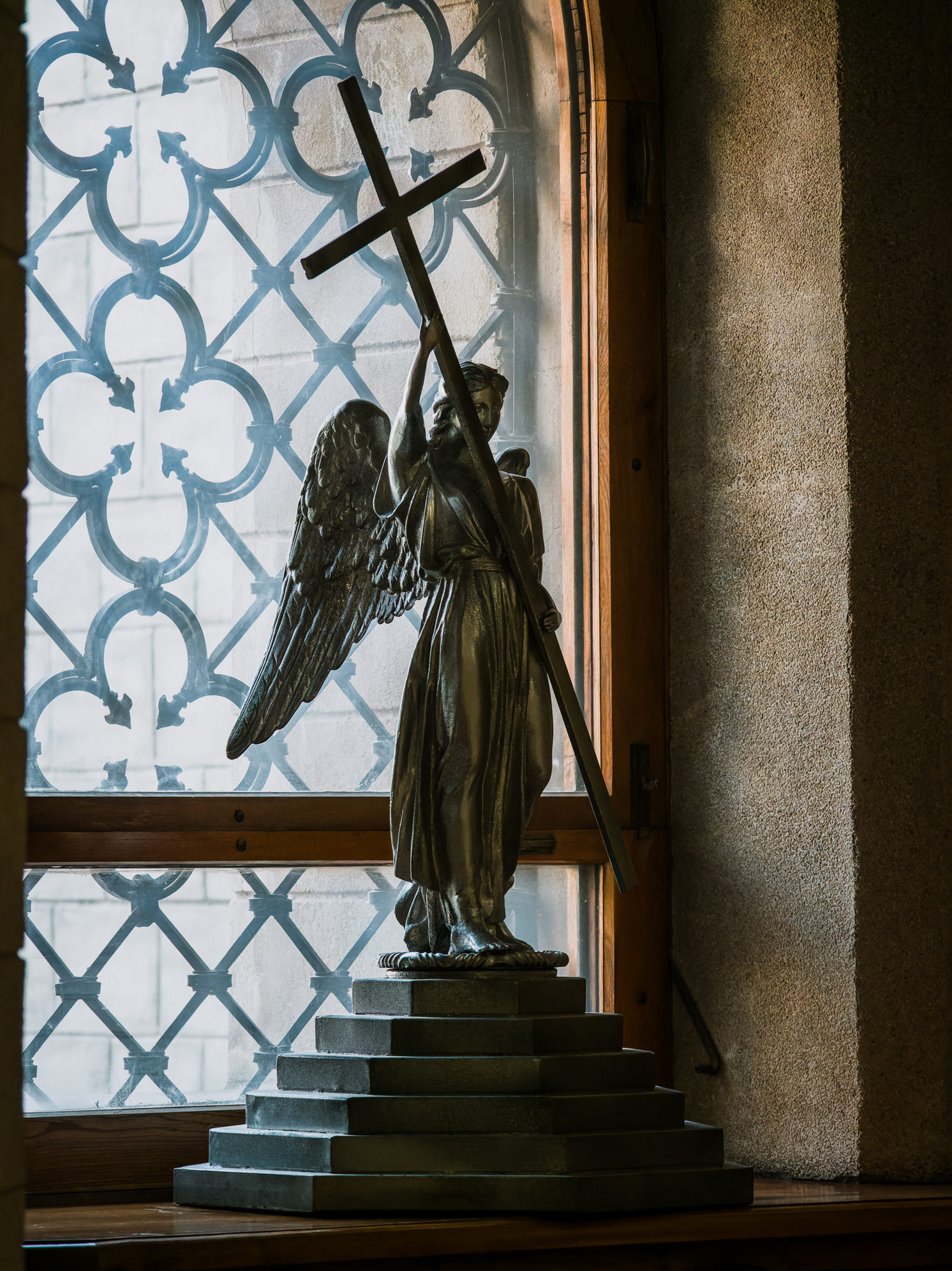

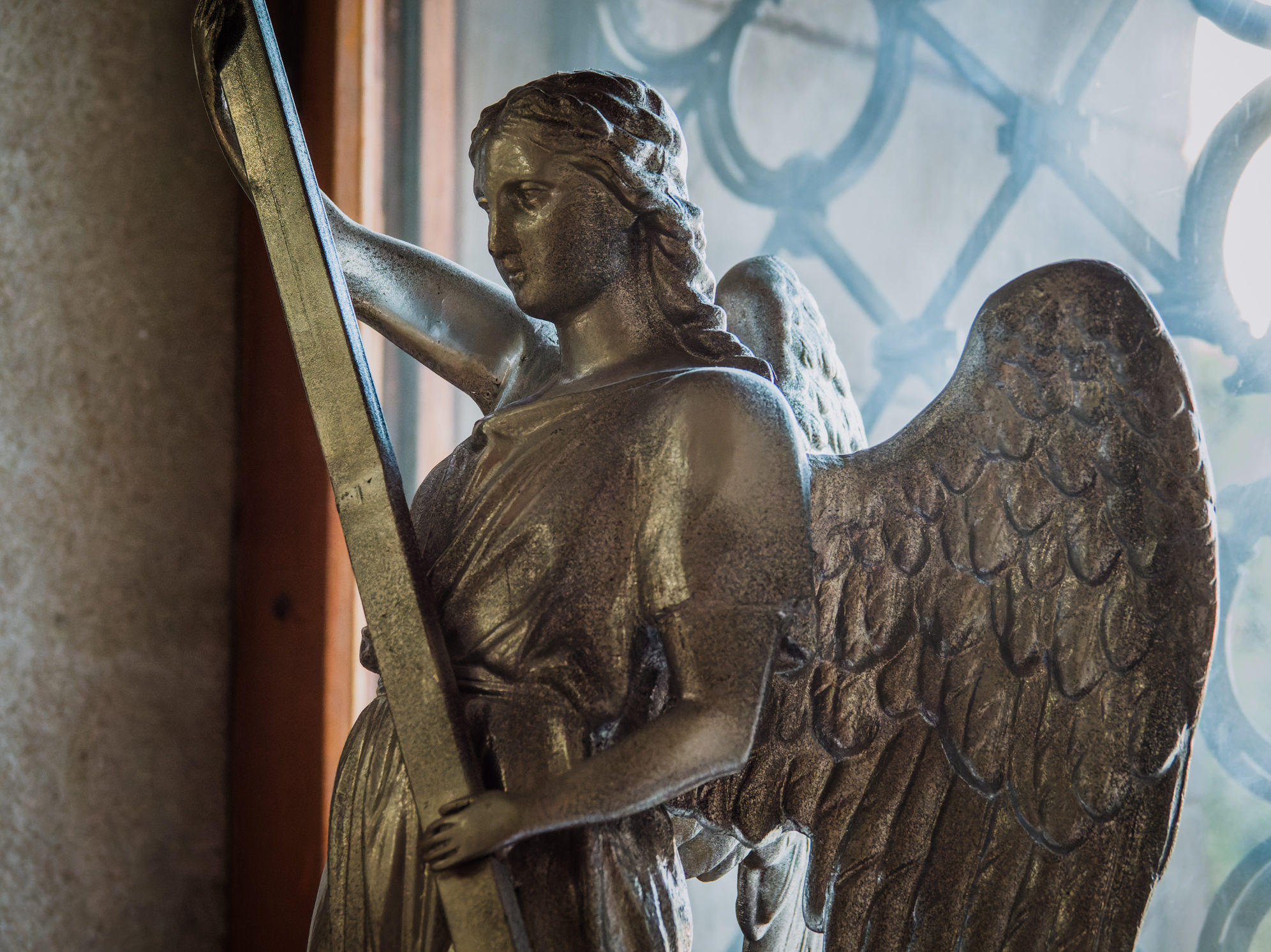

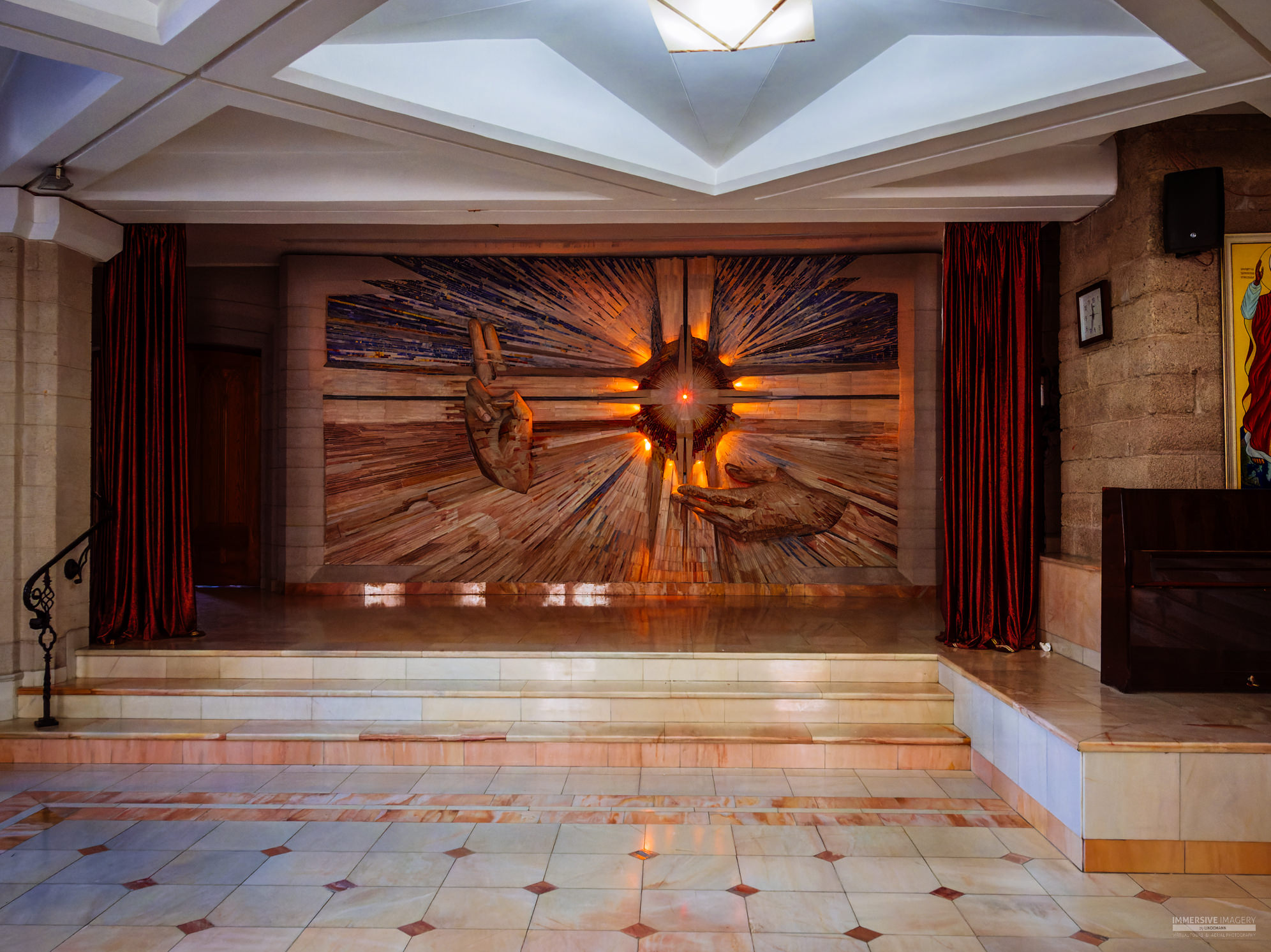

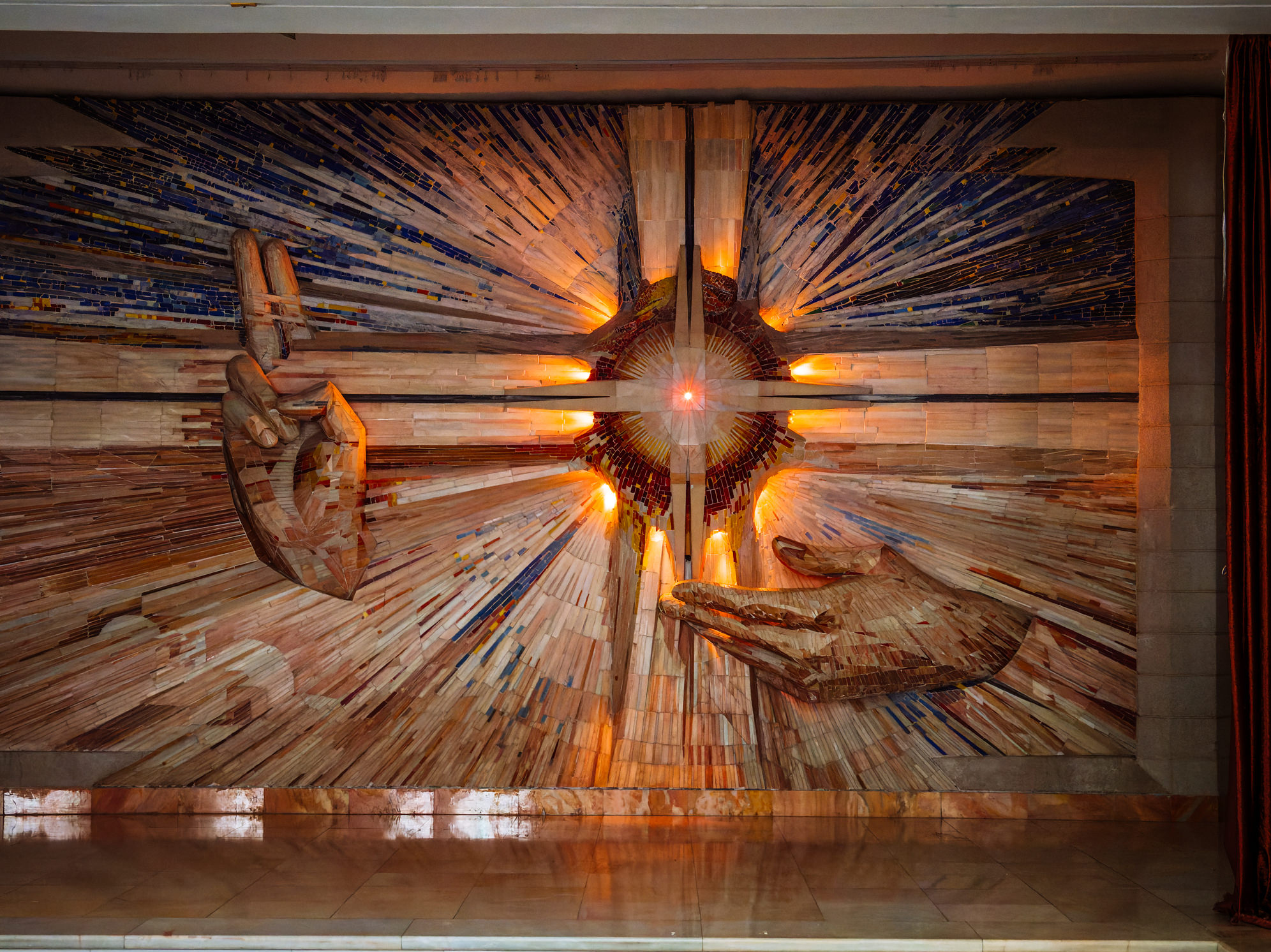

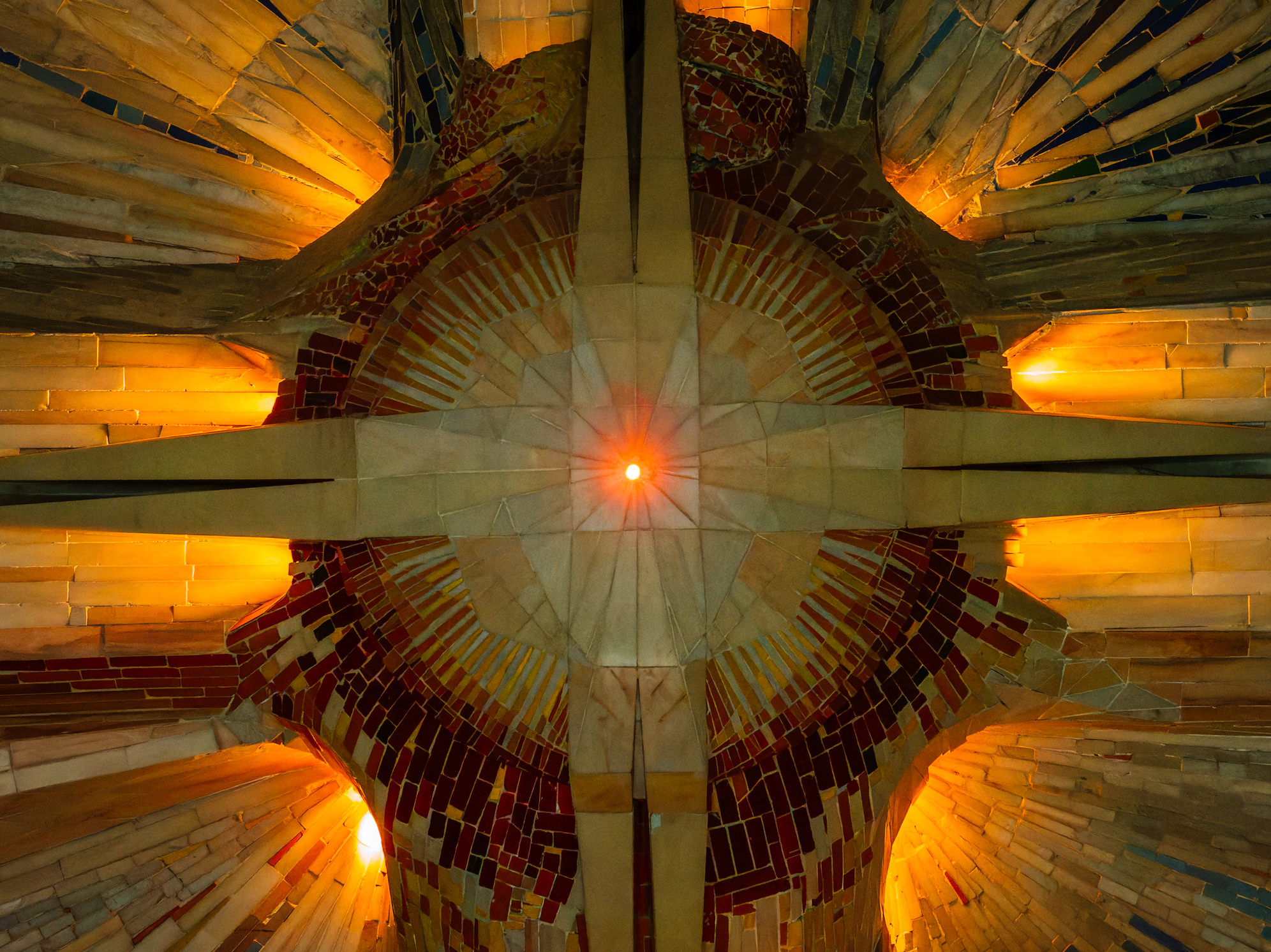

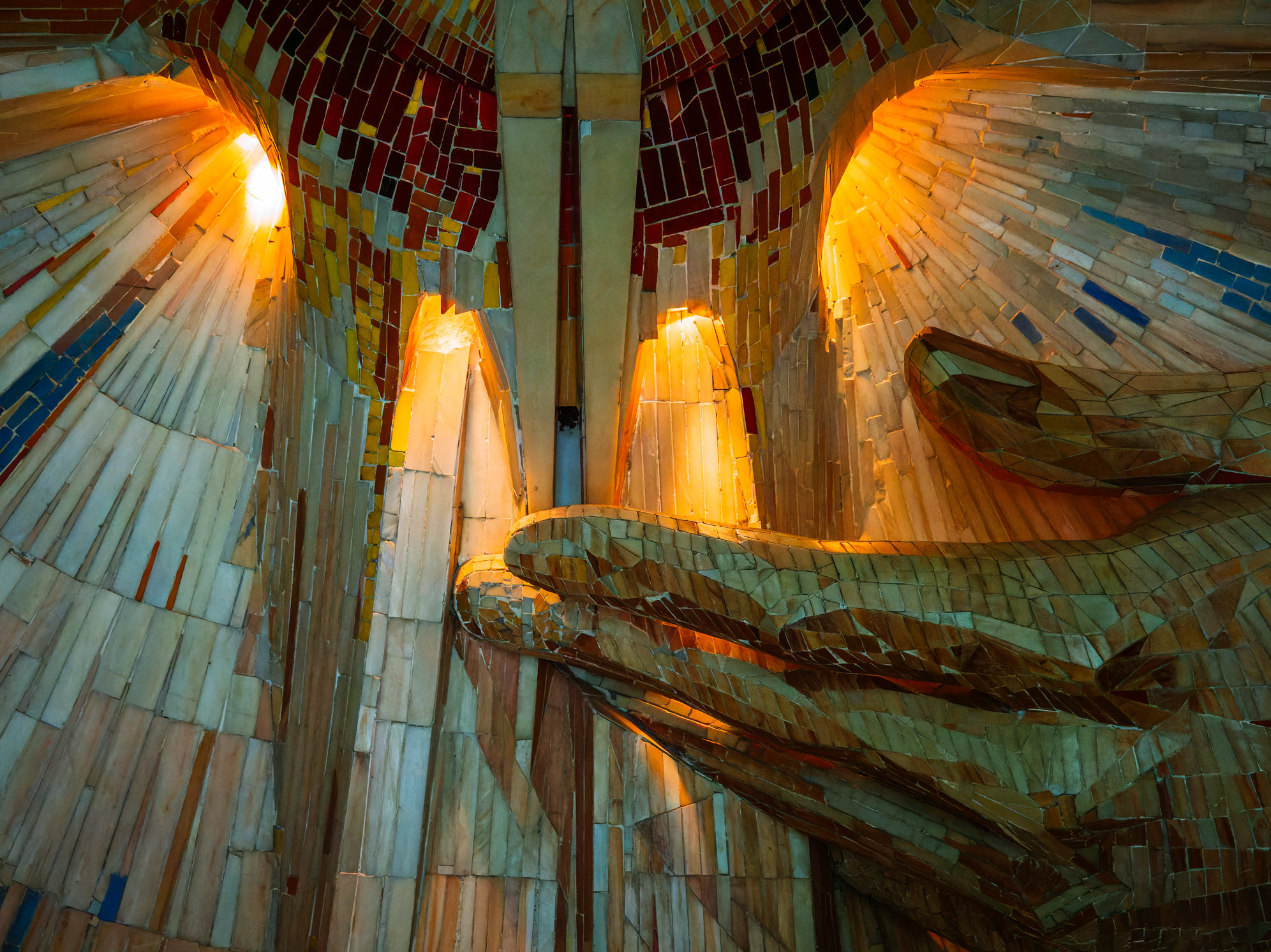

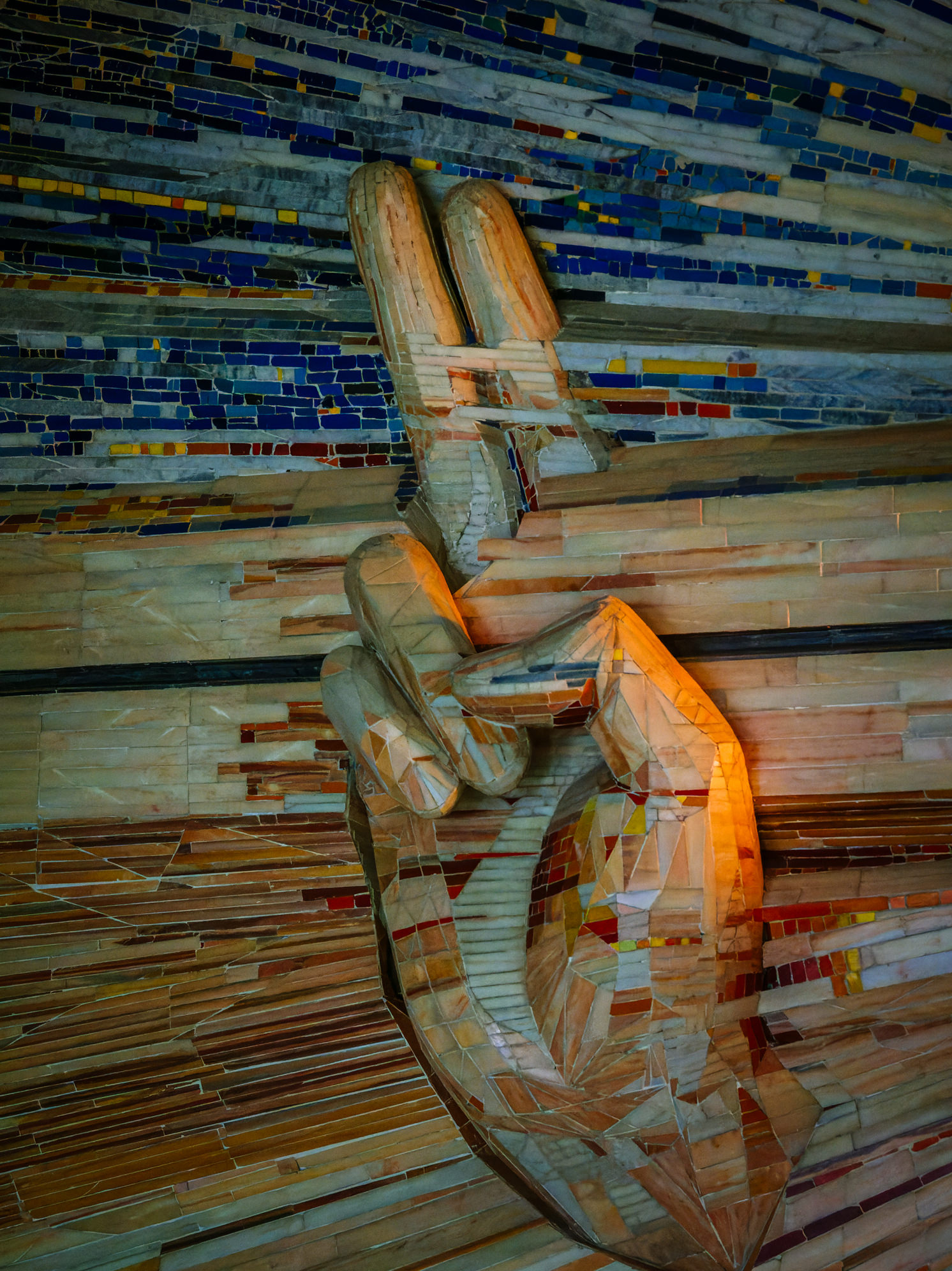

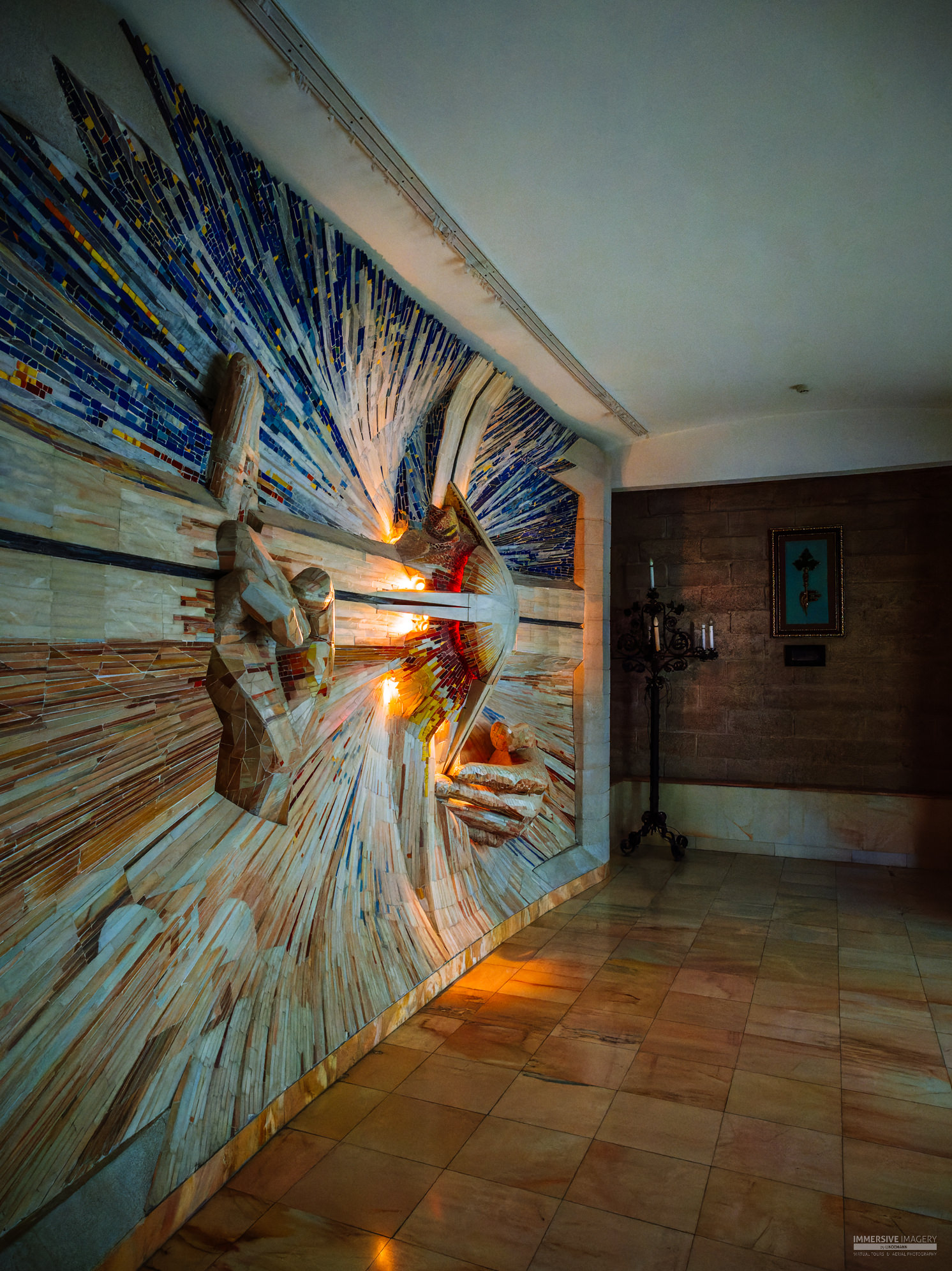

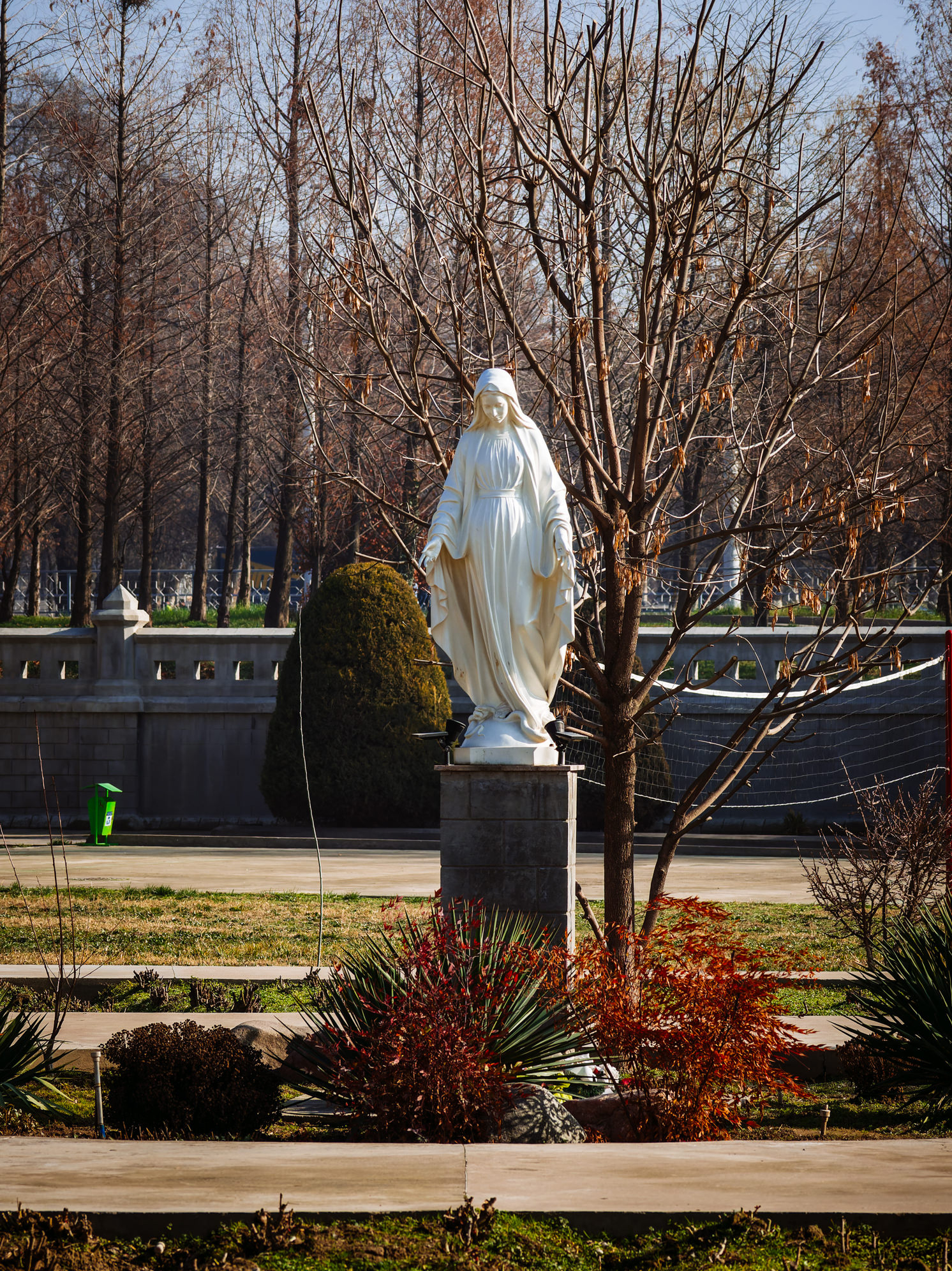

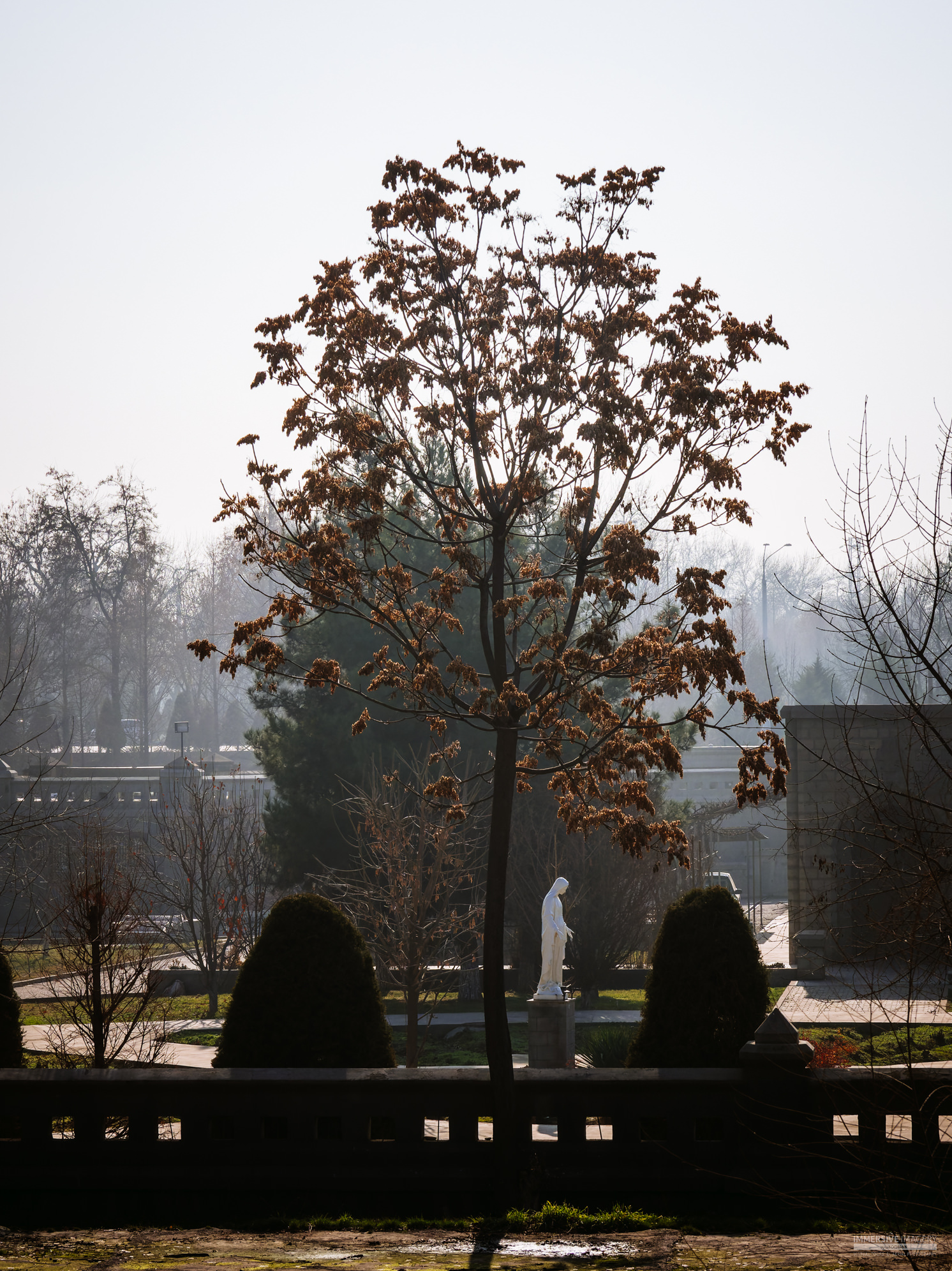

== See also ==
- Roman Catholic Church
- Sacred Heart Cathedral (disambiguation)
- Catholic Church in Uzbekistan
- Adventist Church (Navoiy)
- Saint Nicholas Temple (Gulistan)
- Poles in Uzbekistan
