= Poland–Tajikistan relations =

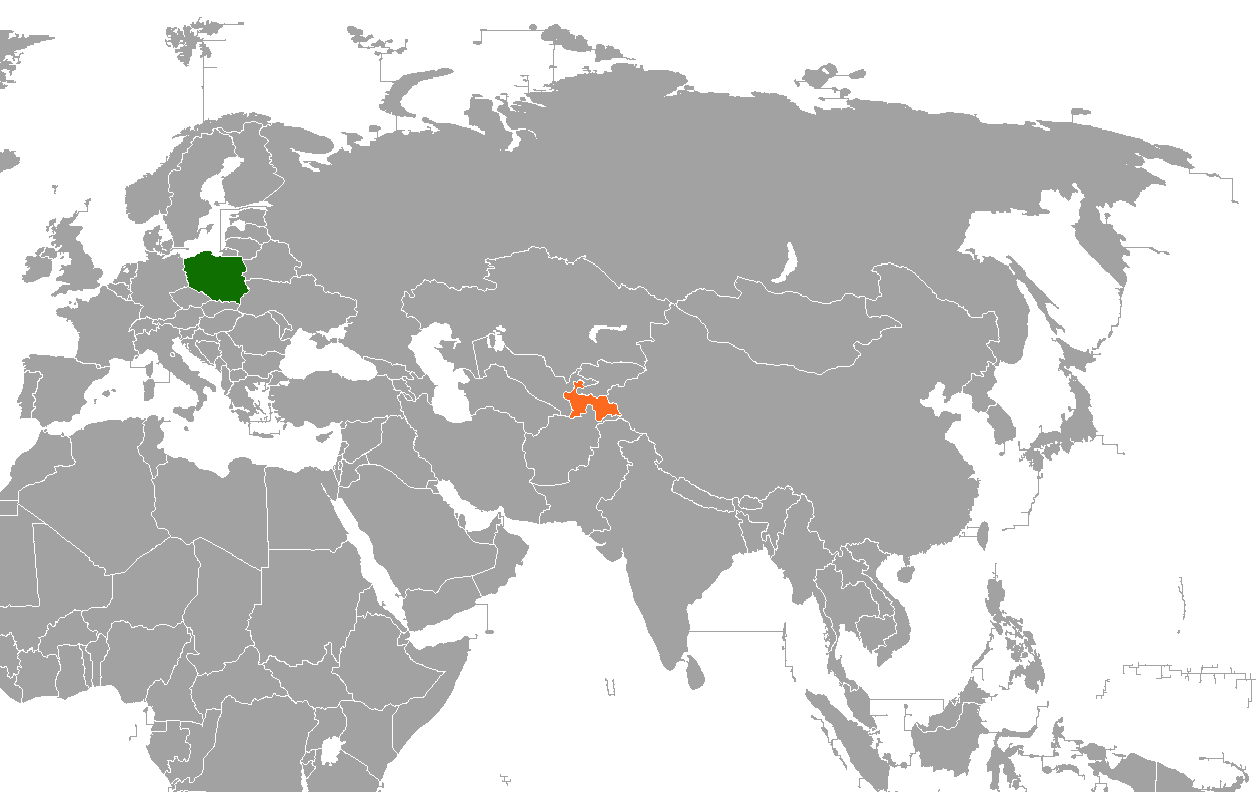

- Poland: Tajikistan

Poland–Tajikistan relations are bilateral relations between Poland and Tajikistan. Both nations are full members of the OSCE, World Trade Organization and United Nations.

== History ==
Following the German-Soviet invasion of Poland, which started World War II in 1939, the Tajik Soviet Socialist Republic was one of the destinations for the deportations of Poles from Soviet-occupied eastern Poland. As of 1943, there were 2,121 Polish citizens in Tajikistan, according to Soviet data. After the war, over 4,500 Poles were repatriated from the Tajik SSR to Poland in 1946–1948.

Poland recognized Tajikistan shortly after the Tajik declaration of independence, and bilateral relations were established in 1992. Several bilateral agreements were signed since, including a double tax avoidance treaty and a cultural and scientific cooperation agreement in Warsaw in 2003, and an economic cooperation agreement in Dushanbe in 2009.

== Education ==
In 2022, there were 415 students from Tajikistan at Polish higher education institutions, forming the 27th largest group of foreign students in Poland, and the fourth largest from Central Asia.

== Diplomatic missions ==
- Poland is accredited to Tajikistan from its embassy in Tashkent, Uzbekistan.
- Tajikistan is accredited to Poland from its embassy in Berlin, Germany.

== See also ==
- Foreign relations of Poland
- Foreign relations of Tajikistan
- Poles in Tajikistan
