= Kyrgyzstan–Poland relations =

- Kyrgyzstan: Poland

Kyrgyzstan–Poland relations are bilateral relations between Kyrgyzstan and Poland. Both nations are full members of the OSCE, World Trade Organization and United Nations.

== History ==
In the late modern period, both nations shared a similar fate, losing their independence to Russia. Poland was divided by Russia, Austria and Prussia (later Germany) in the Partitions of Poland, and the Kara-Kyrgyz Khanate was conquered by Russia. Both nations stood up against Russian rule, Poles most notably in 1830 and 1863 and the Kyrgyz people in 1916. In 1890, 240 Poles lived in present-day Kyrgyzstan.

Following World War I, Poland regained independence and then successfully repelled a Soviet invasion, whereas Kyrgyz territory fell to Soviet rule. In 1937–1938, the Polish community in the Kyrgyz Soviet Socialist Republic, which numbered between 300 and 700 people, was, like in other parts of the USSR, targeted by the genocidal Polish Operation of the NKVD.

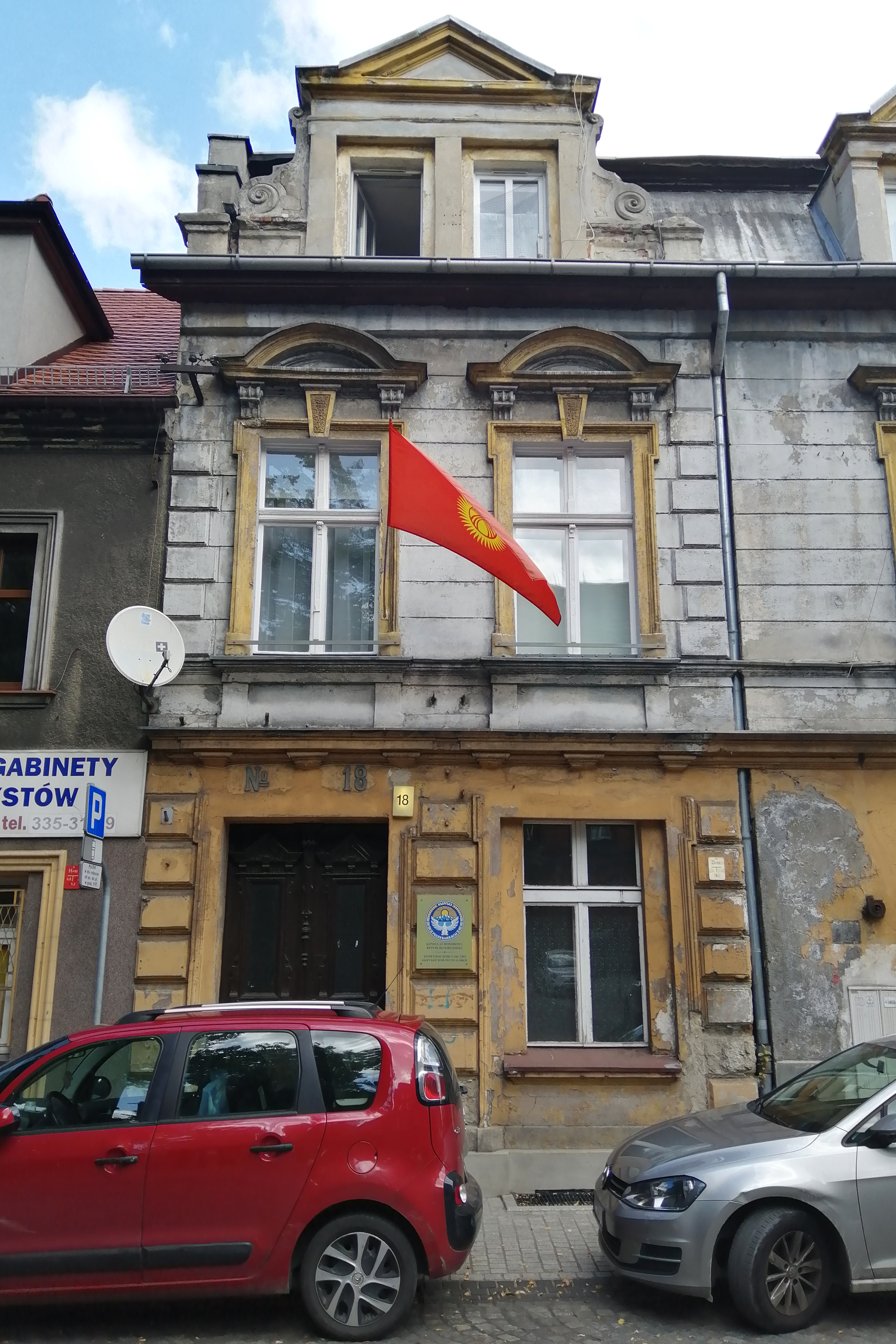
Honorary Consulate of Kyrgyzstan in Gliwice, Poland

Following the German-Soviet invasion of Poland, which started World War II in 1939, the Kyrgyz SSR was one of the destinations for the deportations of Poles from Soviet-occupied eastern Poland. In 1941, also some 200 Polish families from Karelia were deported to the Kyrgyz SSR by the Russians. In early 1942, the Polish Anders' Army along with thousands of civilians was relocated to the Kyrgyz and Uzbek SSRs. The Polish Tank and Artillery Training Centres were based in Kayyngdy and Kara-Suu, respectively, and the automobile battalions were dispatched to Kara-Balta.

The Poles suffered from epidemics and famine and thousands died. There is a Polish cemetery in Jalal-Abad. In 1942, the army with thousands of civilians was evacuated to Iran. As of 1943, there were still over 11,000 Polish citizens in the Kyrgyz SSR, according to Soviet data. After the war, over 11,500 Poles were repatriated from the Kyrgyz SSR to Poland in 1946–1948.

In the 1950s and 1960s, Poles deported to Kazakhstan in 1936 were moving to Kyrgyzstan because of the warmer climate. According to the census of 1959, 1,086 Poles lived in the Kyrgyz SSR.

Poland recognized Kyrgyzstan on 27 December 1991, shortly after the Kyrgyz declaration of independence, and bilateral relations were established on 10 February 1992. A cultural and scientific cooperation treaty and a double tax avoidance agreement were signed between the two countries in 1993 and 1998, respectively.

== Modern relations ==
In October 2021, Poland donated 55,200 COVID-19 vaccines to Kyrgyzstan.

Kyrgyzstani students were the 22nd largest group of foreign students in Poland in 2021, the 21st largest in 2022, the 19th largest in 2023, and the 18th largest in 2024, at the same time being the third largest group from Central Asia (after Uzbekistanis and Kazakhstanis).

== High-level visits ==
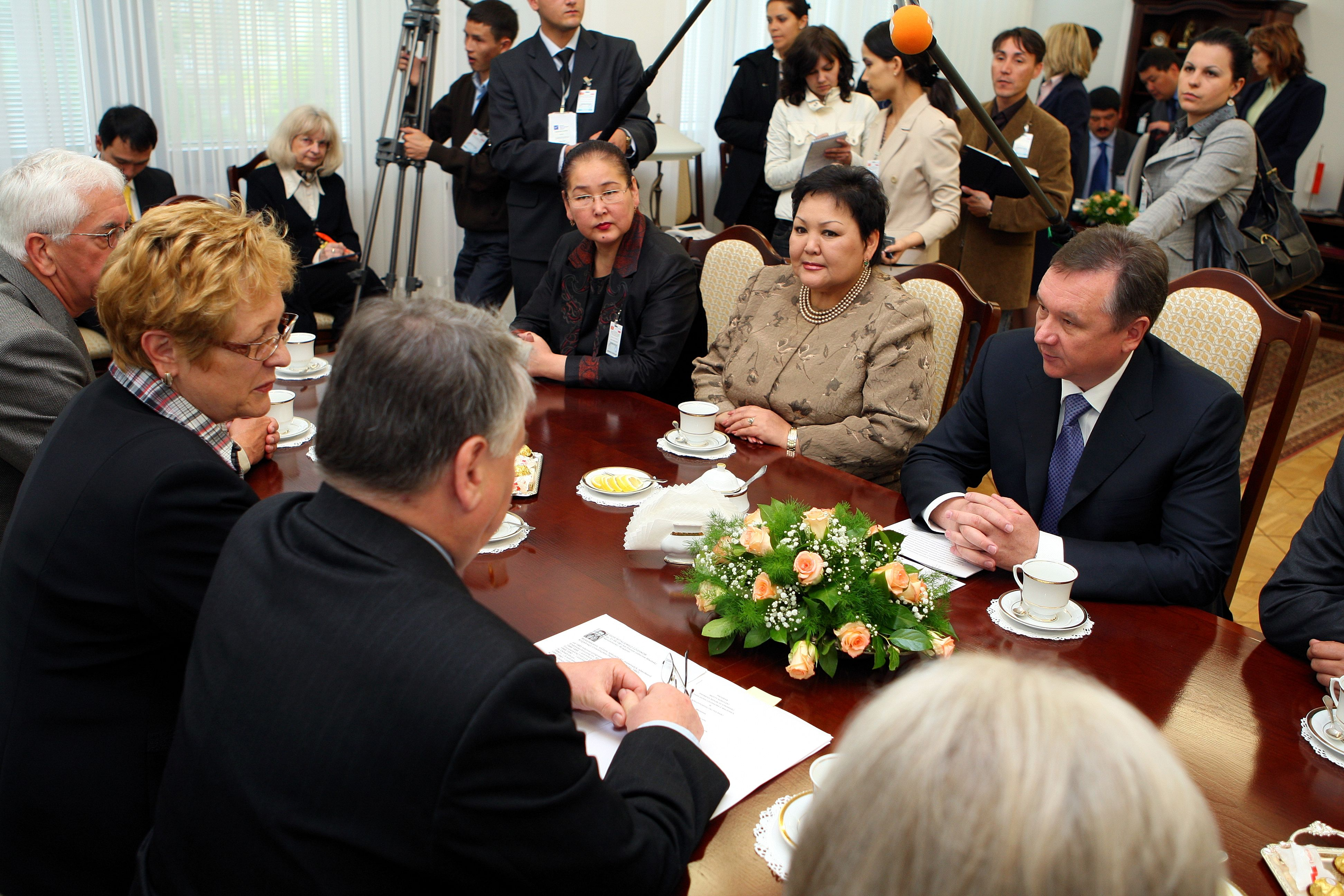
Visit of Prime Minister of Kyrgyzstan Igor Chudinov in the Senate of Poland in 2008

High-level visits from Kyrgyzstan to Poland:

- President Askar Akayev (1998, 2004)
- Prime Minister Igor Chudinov (2008)

High-level visits from Poland to Kyrgyzstan:

- President Aleksander Kwaśniewski (2002)

== Diplomatic missions ==
- Kyrgyzstan is accredited to Poland from its embassy in Berlin, and there is an honorary consulate of Kyrgyzstan in Gliwice.
- Poland is accredited to Kyrgyzstan from its embassy in Astana, and there is an honorary consulate of Poland in Bishkek.

== See also ==
- Foreign relations of Kyrgyzstan
- Foreign relations of Poland
- Poles in Kyrgyzstan
