= Poles in Uzbekistan =

Polish diaspora in Uzbekistan

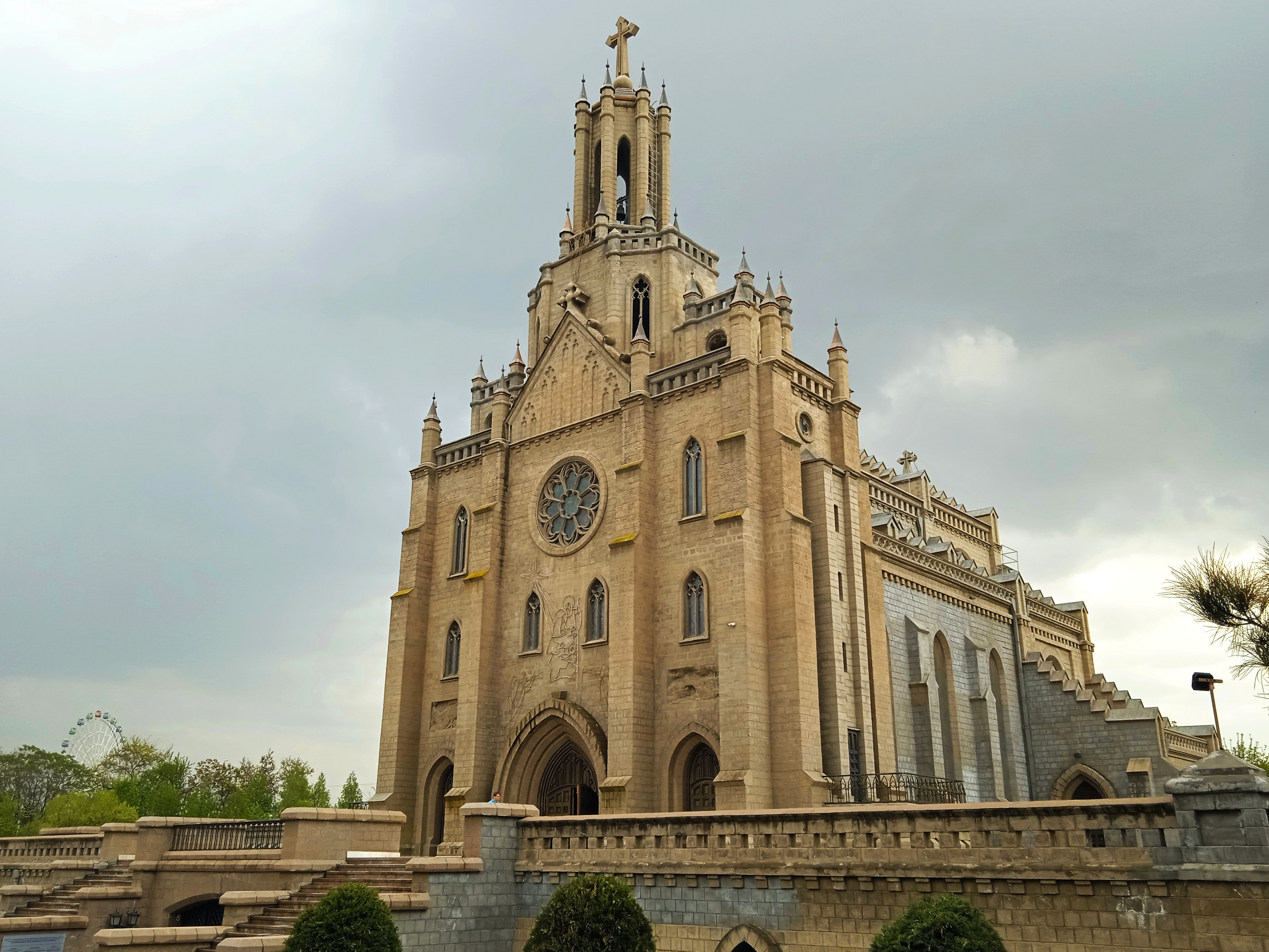
- Sacred Heart Cathedral, Tashkent, also known as the Polish Church

Total population
- 2,000 (2023, est.)

Regions with significant populations
- Tashkent, Samarkand, Bukhara historically also: Fergana, Toʻrtkoʻl, Kokand, Kattakurgan, Andijan, Namangan

Languages
- Polish, Uzbek, and Russian

Religion
- Roman Catholicism

Related ethnic groups
- Poles in Kazakhstan, Poles in Kyrgyzstan, Poles in Tajikistan, Poles in Turkmenistan

Poles in Uzbekistan form a small population, although historically the second most numerous Polish diaspora of Central Asia (after the Poles in Kazakhstan). Polish presence in Uzbekistan dates back to the 19th century.

== History ==
In the late 18th century, Poland lost its independence in the course of the Partitions of Poland, and its territory was annexed by Prussia (later Germany), Russia and Austria, while Uzbek khanates were conquered by Russia in the 19th century. Russian-controlled Uzbek territory was one of the places to which Poles were either deported as political prisoners from the Russian Partition of Poland or were sent after being conscripted to the Russian Army. According to the 1897 census, the overwhelming majority of Poles in Uzbek lands lived in the cities, with the largest populations in Tashkent (2,206), Samarkand (1,072), Fergana (727), Toʻrtkoʻl (299), Kokand (215), Kattakurgan (211), Andijan (194) and Namangan (191). The Poles built the Sacred Heart Cathedral in Tashkent, also known as the Polish Church, now a cultural heritage site of the Uzbek capital.

During World War I, from October 1914 to March 1915, a group of Polish civilians from Warsaw was imprisoned by the Russians in Tashkent. Ethnic Polish conscripts and legionnaires from the Austrian and German armies were held by the Russians in a prisoner-of-war camp in Fergana. The POWs made contact and received help from the local Polish minority, however, many of the Polish prisoners died due to the harsh conditions and typhus epidemic.

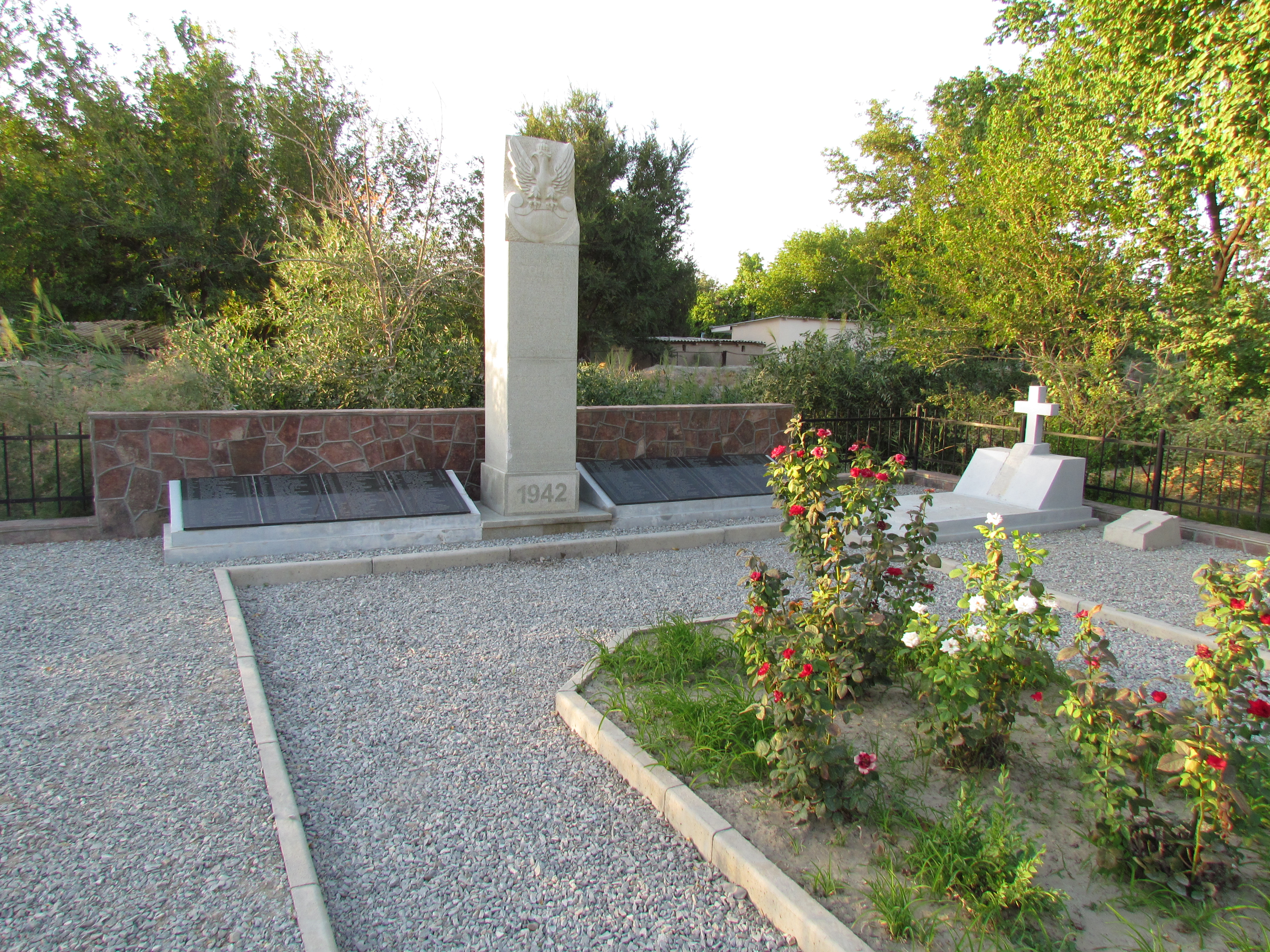
Polish War Cemetery in Karmana

Following the joint German-Soviet invasion of Poland, which started World War II in 1939, the Uzbek Soviet Socialist Republic was one of the destinations for the deportations of Poles from Soviet-occupied eastern Poland. An estimated 100,000 Poles were deported to Uzbekistan. In early 1942, the Polish Anders' Army along with thousands of civilians was relocated to the Uzbek and Kyrgyz SSRs, and Gʻuzor became the organizational center of the army. The Poles suffered from epidemics and famine, so they opened temporary feeding centers, orphanages, clinics and small hospitals, yet 2,500 soldiers and many more civilians still died. A remnant of this period are Polish military cemeteries located in 15 cities in Uzbekistan, including Chiroqchi, Gʻuzor, Jizzakh, Karmana, Kenimekh, Kitob, Margilan, Olmazor, Qarshi, Shahrisabz, Tashkent, Yakkabogʻ, Yangiyoʻl. Since mid-1942, the Soviets thwarted Polish efforts to improve the situation, and carried out arrests of the staff of the Polish diplomatic posts, first Władysław Bugajski in Tashkent in May 1942, and then the staff of the post in Samarkand in July 1942, and then seized and closed the post. In 1942, the Anders' Army with many civilians was evacuated to Iran. As of 1943, there were still over 25,000 Polish citizens in Uzbekistan, according to Soviet data. After the war, over 32,000 Poles were repatriated from the Uzbek SSR to Poland in 1946–1948.

In the 1970s, Polish priest Józef Świdnicki conducted clandestine services for Catholics in Uzbekistan, and after his release from a Soviet forced labour camp in 1987, he founded five Catholic communities. In 1991, Polish Franciscans assumed Catholic priest duties in Tashkent.

In 1997, there were some 3,000 Poles in Uzbekistan. Since then, many Poles left Uzbekistan, and 2023 estimates give the total number of Poles and people of Polish descent in Uzbekistan at 2,000.

== Demographics ==
Historical population

| Year | Pop. | ±% |
|---|---|---|
| 1926 | 3,411 | — |
| 1939 | 3,652 | +7.1% |
| 1959 | 2,941 | −19.5% |
| 1970 | 3,482 | +18.4% |

| Year | Pop. | ±% |
|---|---|---|
| 1979 | 3,654 | +4.9% |
| 1989 | 3,007 | −17.7% |
| 1997 (est.) | 3,000 | −0.2% |
| 2023 (est.) | 2,000 | −33.3% |

== Culture ==
The Poles are organized in several associations, which aim is to preserve, nurture and promote Polish culture in Uzbekistan, with a total of some 1,200 members as of 2023.

== Notable people ==
- Anna German (1936–1982), Polish singer born in Uzbekistan
- Jerzy Maculewicz (born 1955), Apostolic Administrator of Uzbekistan

== See also ==
- Poland–Uzbekistan relations
- Polish diaspora
- Ethnic groups in Uzbekistan
- Uzbeks in Poland
