= Poles in Kyrgyzstan =

Polish diaspora in Kyrgyzstan

Total population
- 1,400 (2007, est.)

Religion
- Christianity, Judaism

Related ethnic groups
- Poles in Kazakhstan, Poles in Turkmenistan, Poles in Uzbekistan

Poles in Kyrgyzstan form a small population, part of the Polish diaspora in Central Asia. Polish presence in Kyrgyzstan dates back to the 19th century.

== History ==
Historical population
Year	Pop.	±%
1890	240	—
1926	282	+17.5%
1939	808	+186.5%
1959	1,086	+34.4%
1970	1,448	+33.3%
1979	1,961	+35.4%
1989	1,389	−29.2%

In 1890, 240 Poles lived in present-day Kyrgyzstan. According to the 1897 census, the largest Polish community, with 188 people, was in Osh.

In 1937–1938, the Polish community in the Kyrgyz Soviet Socialist Republic, which numbered between 300 and 700 people, was, like in other parts of the USSR, targeted by the genocidal Polish Operation of the NKVD.

Following the joint German-Soviet invasion of Poland, which started World War II in 1939, the Kyrgyz SSR was one of the destinations for the deportations of Poles from Soviet-occupied eastern Poland. In 1941, also some 200 Polish families from Karelia were deported to the Kyrgyz SSR by the Russians. In early 1942, the Polish Anders' Army along with thousands of civilians was relocated to the Kyrgyz and Uzbek SSRs. The Polish Tank and Artillery Training Centres were based in Kayyngdy and Kara-Suu, respectively, and the automobile battalions were dispatched to Kara-Balta. The Poles suffered from epidemics and famine and thousands died. There is a Polish cemetery in Jalal-Abad. In 1942, the army with thousands of civilians was evacuated to Iran. As of 1943, there were still over 11,000 Polish citizens in the Kyrgyz SSR, according to Soviet data. After the war, over 11,500 Poles were repatriated from the Kyrgyz SSR to Poland in 1946–1948.

In the 1950s and 1960s, Poles deported to Kazakhstan in 1936 were moving to Kyrgyzstan because of the warmer climate.

== See also ==
- Kyrgyzstan–Poland relations
- Polish diaspora
- Ethnic groups in Kyrgyzstan
