= List of twice Heroes of Socialist Labour =

This is a list of twice Heroes of Socialist Labour; 201 people were double holders of the title. This list does not include individuals who were awarded the title additional times or stripped of it.

Name	Field	1st award date	2nd award date	Source
Sergey Aleksandrovich Afanasyev	Government	14 February 1975	29 August 1978	
Tursunoy Akhunova	Agriculture	25 December 1959	20 February 1978	
Tashtanbek Akmatov ru	Agriculture	25 December 1976	20 June 1986	
Nurmolda Aldabergenov	Agriculture	28 March 1948	29 March 1958	
Aleksandr Petrovich Aleksandrov ru	Construction, Hydropower	19 September 1952	9 September 1961	
Heydar Aliyev	Government	24 August 1979	7 May 1983	
Viktor Amazaspovich Ambartsumian	Astrophysics	17 September 1968	15 September 1978	
Praskovya Nikitichna Angelina	Agriculture	19 March 1947	26 February 1958	
Alla Anorov	Agriculture	26 March 1948	26 April 1951	
Basti Masim gizi Bagirova	Agriculture	19 March 1947	17 June 1950	
Jabay Balimanov ru	Agriculture	7 July 1951	6 August 1958	
Ulyana Spiridonovna Barkova	Agriculture	25 August 1948	3 December 1951	
Nikolay Gennadievich Basov	Physics	13 March 1969	13 December 1982	
Grigory Ivanovich Bayda ru	Agriculture	29 May 1951	26 February 1958	
Vladimir Leontevich Bedulya ru	Agriculture	8 April 1969	23 May 1987	
Ivan Fyodorovich Beloborodov ru	Manufacturing	28 July 1966	21 December 1979	
Rostislav Apollosovich Belyakov ru	Aviation	26 April 1971	2 February 1982	
Spiridon Yerofeevich Beshulya ru	Agriculture	2 June 1950	26 February 1958	
Anatoly Arkadevich Blagonravov	Mechanical engineering	30 May 1964	31 May 1974	
Yevgeny Viktorovich Blazhevsky ru	Agriculture	7 June 1950	26 February 1958	
Andrey Anatolyevich Bochvar ru	Metallurgy	29 October 1949	4 January 1954	
Nikolay Nikolaevich Bogolyubov	Mathematics, physics	13 March 1969	20 August 1979	
David Vasilyevich Boyko ru	Agriculture	16 February 1948	26 February 1958	
Mark Andronovich Braga ru	Agriculture	17 June 1949	26 February 1958	
Ivan Ivanovich Bridko ru	Coal	28 August 1948	26 April 1957	
Mariya Aleksandrovna Bryantseva ru	Agriculture	24 June 1949	26 February 1958	
Boris Pavlovich Bugaev	Government	15 August 1966	25 July 1983	
Boris Vasilyevich Bunkin ru	Missile design	25 March 1958	22 July 1982	
Galina Yevgeniya Burkatskaya	Agriculture	18 May 1951	26 February 1958	
Ivan Andreevich Buyanov ru	Agriculture	18 September 1950	30 January 1957	
Vladimir Nikolaevich Chelomey	Rocketry	26 June 1959	28 April 1963	
Vasily Makarovich Cherdintsev ru	Agriculture	23 June 1966	6 June 1984	
Aleksandr Dmitrievich Chervyakov ru	Agriculture	23 December 1976	14 March 1986	
Vladimir Stepanovich Chicherov ru	Plumbing	7 February 1975	12 July 1983	
Mikhail Pavlovich Chikh ru	Coal	30 March 1971	21 March 1983	
Aleksey Vasilyevich Chuev ru	Shipbuilding	28 April 1963	7 January 1976	
Pyotr Vasilyevich Dementyev ru	Aviation ministry	8 September 1941	21 January 1977	
Olga Klimentevna Diptan ru	Agriculture	16 March 1954	26 February 1958	
Vladimir Ivanovich Dolgikh	Government	4 December 1965	4 December 1984	
Yevgeniya Alekseevna Dolinyuk ru	Agriculture	4 May 1951	26 February 1958	
Nikolay Antonovich Dollezhal	Engineering	29 October 1949	26 October 1984	
Yegor Ivanovich Drozdetsky ru	Coal	29 June 1966	21 March 1983	
Fyodor Ivanovich Dubkovetsky ru	Agriculture	18 May 1951	26 February 1958	
Orazgeldy Ersaryev ru	Agriculture	19 March 1947	14 February 1957	
Oleg Vasilyevich Filatov ru	Electronic instruments	29 March 1976	7 January 1986	
Ivan Dmitrievich Ganchev ru	Construction	11 September 1966	1 April 1986	
Shamama Mahmudali gizi Gasanova	Agriculture	19 March 1947	17 June 1950	
Fyodor Stepanovich Generalov ru	Agriculture	24 June 1949	30 January 1957	
Aleksandr Vasilyevich Gitalov ru	Agriculture	16 February 1948	26 February 1958	
Valentin Petrovich Glushko	Rocketry	20 April 1956	17 June 1961	
Nikolay Nikitich Golovatsky ru	Agriculture	23 June 1966	17 January 1985	
Valentina Nikolaevna Golubeva ru	Textile	1 August 1977	2 April 1984	
Dmitry Ivanovich Gontar ru	Agriculture	30 April 1951	15 May 1954	
Grigory Yakovlevich Gorban ru	Metallurgy	30 March 1971	25 January 1978	
Vasily Yakovlevich Gorin ru	Agriculture	8 April 1971	2 April 1985	
Akim Vasilyevich Gorshkov ru	Agriculture	26 June 1951	20 September 1973	
Yevdokiya Isaevna Grekhova	Agriculture	25 August 1948	3 December 1951	
Viktor Vasilyevich Grishin	Government	17 September 1974	17 September 1984	
Andrey Andreevich Gromyko	Government	17 July 1969	17 July 1979	
Pyotr Dmitrievich Grushin	Missile design	15 January 1958	20 April 1981	
Prokofy Zakharovich Gvozdkov ru	Agriculture	15 February 1948	20 November 1958	
Nikolay Nikitich Isanin ru	Shipbuilding	28 April 1963	19 April 1974	
Karim Ismailov ru	Agriculture	1 May 1948	17 January 1957	
Lidiya Pavlovna Ivanova ru	Agriculture	25 August 1948	3 December 1951	
Mikhail Timofeevich Kalashnikov	Weaponry	20 June 1958	15 January 1976	
Pyotr Leonidovich Kapitsa	Physics	30 April 1945	8 July 1974	
Zuurakan Kaynazarova	Agriculture	26 March 1948	15 February 1957	
Isaak Konstantinovich Kikoin	Physics	8 December 1951	27 March 1978	
Kim Pen Hwa	Agriculture	27 April 1948	26 August 1951	
Andrey Pavlovich Kirilenko	Government	7 September 1966	7 September 1976	
Mikhail Ivanovich Klepikov ru	Agriculture	31 December 1965	5 June 1986	
Vladimir Yakovlevich Klimov ru	Aviation	28 October 1940	12 July 1957	
Mariya Danilovna Knyazeva ru	Agriculture	22 February 1955	26 February 1958	
Samvel Grigorievich Kocharyants	Nuclear	7 March 1962	6 January 1984	
Sergey Pavlovich Korolyov	Rocketry	20 April 1956	17 June 1961	
Sergey Ksenofontovich Korotkov ru	Agriculture	19 March 1948	18 April 1961	
Aleksey Nikolaevich Kosygin	Government	20 February 1964	20 February 1974	
Vladimir Aleksandrovich Kotelnikov	Radiophysics	13 March 1969	5 September 1978	
Aleksandr Vlasovich Kovalenko ru	Government	7 May 1948	6 October 1976	
Sergey Nikitich Kovalyov	Shipbuilding	28 April 1963	4 December 1974	
Praskovaya Nikolaevna Kovrova ru	Agriculture	2 February 1952	7 February 1957	
Dmitry Ilyich Kozlov	Rocketry	17 June 1961	26 July 1979	
Zhazylbek Kuanyshbaev ru	Agriculture	23 July 1948	29 March 1958	
Ivan Ivanovich Kukhar ru	Agriculture	11 December 1973	31 December 1986	
Tamara Andreevna Kupuniya	Agriculture	21 February 1948	1 September 1951	
Nikolay Alekseevich Kuznetsov	Aviation	9 February 1973	12 January 1979	
Nikolay Dmitrievich Kuznetsov ru	Aviation	12 July 1957	23 June 1981	
Viktor Ivanovich Kuznetsov ru	Rocketry	20 April 1956	17 June 1961	
Vasily Vasilyevich Kuznetsov	Government	12 February 1971	12 February 1981	
Anna Mikhailovna Ladani ru	Agriculture	28 February 1949	26 February 1958	
Semyon Alekseevich Lavochkin	Aviation	21 June 1943	20 April 1956	
Endel Augustovich Lieberg ru	Livestock	8 April 1971	10 July 1987	
Vasily Timofeevich Litvinenko ru	Agriculture	16 February 1948	26 February 1958	
Viktor Yakovlevich Litvinov	Aviation	16 September 1945	29 July 1960	
Mikhail Grigoryevich Lobytov ru	Agriculture	30 April 1966	11 October 1985	
Pavel Panteleymonovich Lukyanenko ru	Agriculture	31 October 1957	8 April 1971	
Yustin Torovich Lychuk ru	Agriculture	31 December 1961	22 December 1977	
Lev Veniaminovich Lyulev ru	Agriculture	22 July 1966	3 September 1985	
Aleksandr Maksimovich Makarov	Rocketry	17 June 1961	12 August 1976	
Viktor Petrovich Makeev	Rocketry	17 June 1961	24 October 1974	
Fyodor Pavlovich Maksimov ru	Agriculture	4 May 1948	7 December 1957	
Praskovaya Andreevna Malinina ru	Agriculture	23 July 1948	6 November 1974	
Terenty Semyonovich Maltsev ru	Agriculture	9 November 1955	6 November 1975	
Georgy Mokeevich Markov ru	Literature	27 September 1974	16 November 1984	
Tatyana Filippovna Martsin ru	Agriculture	16 February 1948	26 February 1958	
Mariya Antonovna Martsun ru	Agriculture	3 November 1953	26 February 1958	
Afanasy Prokopyevich Mikhalyov ru	Manufacturing	9 July 1966	31 August 1978	
Artyom Ivanovich Mikoyan	Aviation	20 April 1956	12 July 1957	
Grigory Sergeevich Mogilchenko ru	Agriculture	7 May 1948	26 February 1958	
Aleksandr Aleksandrovich Morozov	Engineering	20 January 1943	25 October 1974	
Dmitry Konstantinovich Motornyy ru	Agriculture	22 March 1966	20 January 1986	
Boris Glebovich Muzrukov ru	Engineering	20 January 1943	29 October 1949	
Aleksandr Davidovich Nadiradze	Engineering	9 September 1976	5 January 1982	
Vasily Dmitrievich Naumkin ru	Metallurgy	5 March 1976	18 September 1985	
Aleksandr Nikolaevich Nesmeyanov ru	Chemistry	13 March 1969	7 September 1979	
Agrafena Vasilyevna Nilova ru	Agriculture	25 August 1948	3 December 1951	
Hamroqul Nosirov	Agriculture	11 January 1957	20 February 1978	
Genrikh Vasilyevich Novozhilov	Aviation	26 April 1971	23 June 1981	
Aleksandr Emmanuilovich Nudelman	Weaponry	28 July 1966	20 August 1982	
Mikhail Panfilovich Panfilov ru	Optics	28 July 1966	22 July 1983	
Yemelyan Nikonovich Parubok ru	Agriculture	22 December 1977	6 June 1984	
Nikolay Semyonovich Patolichev	Government	30 December 1975	22 September 1978	
Boris Yevgeniyevich Paton	Metallurgy	13 March 1969	24 November 1978	
Arvid Yanovich Pelshe	Government	6 February 1969	6 February 1979	
Fyodor Nikolavich Petrov ru	Encyclopedia	21 July 1961	21 July 1971	
Kseniya Kupriyanovna Petukhova ru	Agriculture	21 August 1953	7 February 1957	
Nikolay Alekseevich Pilyugin	Rocketry	20 April 1956	17 June 1961	
Yuri Yuryevich Pitra ru	Agriculture	26 February 1958	22 December 1977	
Vladimir Antonivich Plyutinsky ru	Agriculture	8 April 1971	8 May 1986	
Nikolai Viktorovich Podgorny	Government	16 February 1963	16 February 1973	
Pavel Vasilyevich Popov ru	Timber	12 January 1973	13 February 1986	
Makar Anisimovich Posmitnyy ru	Agriculture	21 March 1949	26 February 1958	
Aleksandr Mikhailovich Prokhorov	Physics	13 March 1969	10 July 1986	
Pyotr Alekseevich Prozorov ru	Agriculture	17 March 1948	24 April 1958	
Gennady Aleksandrovich Pushkin ru	Weaponry	26 April 1971	20 April 1987	
Vasily Stepanovich Pustovoyt ru	Agriculture	31 October 1957	10 April 1963	
Vladimir Antonovich Ralko ru	Agriculture	18 January 1958	23 February 1976	
Sharof Rashidovich Rashidov	Government	30 December 1974	4 November 1977	
Vasily Nikolaevich Remeslo ru	Agriculture	23 June 1966	9 February 1977	
Vadim Fedotovich Reznikov ru	Agriculture	31 October 1957	11 October 1985	
Antimoz Mikhailovich Rogava ru	Agriculture	21 February 1948	1 September 1951	
Prokofy Kalenkovich Romanenko ru	Agriculture	28 August 1952	26 February 1958	
Vladimir Gannadyevich Sadovnikov ru	Rocketry	9 September 1976	15 May 1981	
Abdugafur Samatov ru	Agriculture	17 January 1957	2 April 1979	
Mariya Kharitovna Savchenko	Agriculture	2 September 1948	26 February 1958	
Yakov Fyodorovich Savchenko ru	Chemistry and weaponry	26 April 1971	21 October 1983	
Marta Alimovna Semule ru	Agriculture	28 August 1953	15 February 1958	
Nikolay Nikolayevich Semyonov	Chemical physics	14 April 1966	14 April 1976	
Vladimir Grigoryevich Sergeev ru	Rocketry	17 June 1961	12 August 1976	
Vladimir Vasilyevich Shcherbitsky	Government	30 December 1974	13 September 1977	
Aleksandr Nikolaevich Shchukin ru	Radiophysics	20 April 1956	21 July 1975	
Leonid Iosifovich Shlifer ru	Agriculture	1 April 1965	8 May 1986	
Aleksandr Ivanovich Shokin ru	Government	17 February 1975	26 October 1979	
Mariya Dmitrievna Sholar ru	Agriculture	26 February 1958	17 August 1988	
Mikhail Aleksandrovich Sholokhov	Literature	23 February 1967	23 May 1980	
Viktor Ivanovich Shtepo ru	Agriculture	8 April 1971	9 September 1987	
Leonid Vasilyevich Smirnov	Government	17 June 1961	6 October 1982	
Vasily Aleksandrovich Smirnov ru	Shipbuilding	28 May 1960	28 June 1978	
Anna Ivanovna Smirnova ru	Agriculture	12 July 1949	4 March 1953	
Nina Appolinarevna Smirnova ru	Agriculture	12 July 1949	4 March 1953	
Viktor Fadeevich Sokolov ru	Railway	5 March 1976	13 June 1984	
Mikhail Sergeevich Solomentsev	Government	5 November 1973	5 November 1983	
Vasily Konstantinovich Starovoytov ru	Agriculture	22 March 1966	13 June 1984	
Ivan Ivanovich Strelchenko ru	Coal	14 February 1966	25 January 1978	
Nikolay Sergeevich Stroev ru	Government	22 July 1966	19 January 1982	
Mikhail Fyodorovich Sukharenko ru	Chemistry and weaponry	16 January 1974	6 October 1982	
Pavel Osipovich Sukhoi	Aviation	12 July 1957	8 July 1965	
Mikhail Andreevich Suslov	Government	20 November 1962	20 November 1972	
Prokofy Nikolaevich Svanidze ru	Agriculture	21 February 1948	8 May 1951	
Grigory Petrovich Svishchyov ru	Aerodynamics	12 July 1957	23 December 1982	
Khaytakhun Tashirov ru	Agriculture	20 March 1951	15 May 1957	
Nikolay Dmitrievich Tereshchenko ru	Agriculture	12 March 1982	4 October 1986	
Andrey Nikolaevich Tikhonov	Mathematics	4 January 1954	29 October 1986	
Nikolay Aleksandrovich Tikhonov	Government	13 May 1975	12 October 1982	
Grigory Ivanovich Tkachuk ru	Agriculture	26 February 1958	22 December 1977	
Ivan Yakovlevich Trashutin ru	Engine	19 February 1966	19 January 1976	
Aleksandr Ivanovich Tselikov	Metallurgy	18 April 1964	20 April 1984	
Nikolay Vasilyevich Tsitsin ru	Botany	17 December 1968	15 December 1978	
Galina Sergeevna Ulanova	Ballet	16 May 1974	7 January 1980	
Aleksey Aleksandrovich Ulesov ru	Construction	19 September 1952	9 August 1958	
Saidkhodzha Urunkhodzhaev ru	Agriculture	1 March 1948	17 January 1957	
Dmitry Fyodorovich Ustinov	Government	3 June 1942	17 June 1961	
Vladimir Fyodorovich Utkin	Rocketry	29 August 1969	12 August 1976	
Pyotr Fyodorovich Vdovenko ru	Agriculture	26 February 1958	25 December 1959	
Pavel Filippovich Veduta ru	Agriculture	24 June 1949	26 February 1958	
Aleksandr Pavlovich Vinogradov	Chemistry	29 October 1949	20 August 1975	
Ivan Matveevich Vinogradov	Mathematics	10 June 1945	13 September 1971	
Vasily Petrovich Vinogradov ru	Government	6 January 1975	4 January 1985	
Stepanida Demidovna Vishtak ru	Agriculture	11 April 1949	7 August 1952	
Pyotr Mitrofanovich Volovikov ru	Agriculture	26 February 1958	17 August 1988	
Pavel Andreevich Voronin ru	Aviation	8 September 1941	2 February 1982	
Aleksandr Sergeevich Yakolvev	Aviation	28 October 1940	12 July 1957	
Mikhail Kuzmich Yangel	Rocketry	26 June 1959	17 June 1961	
Vladimir Mikhailovich Yargin ru	Mechanical engineering	3 March 1976	18 September 1985	
Vasily Yakovlevich Yuryev ru	Agriculture	15 May 1954	29 June 1959	
Avraamy Pavlovich Zavenyagin	Government	29 October 1949	4 January 1954	
Pavel Mikhailovich Zernov ru	Government	29 October 1949	11 September 1956	
Ibray Zhakhaev ru	Agriculture	29 May 1949	13 May 1971	
Filipp Alekseevich Zhelyuk ru	Agriculture	26 February 1958	29 November 1974	
Boris Petrovich Zhukov ru	Chemistry and Rocketry	28 July 1966	5 January 1982	
Nikolai Anatolyevich Zlobin ru	Construction	7 May 1971	18 September 1985	
