= Hamroqul Nosirov =

Uzbek kolkhoz chairman

- Born: 1904; Suvangarlik village, Samarkand region, Turkestan Krai, Russian Empire (located within present-day Jizzakh Region, Uzbekistan)
- Died: 7 October 1978 (aged 73–74); Jizzakh, Uzbek SSR, Soviet Union
- Awards: Hero of Socialist Labour (twice)

Hamroqul Nosirov (Russian: Хамрокул Насыров, Uzbek: Ҳамроқул Носиров; 1904 – 7 October 1978) was a kolkhoz chairman in the Uzbek SSR who was twice awarded the title Hero of Socialist Labour.

== Biography ==
Nosirov was born in 1904 to an impoverished Uzbek family in Suvangarlik village, located in what is now the Sharof Rashidov District of Uzbekistan. With the establishment of kolkhozes in the region in the 1920s, he joined the first agriculture artel in Jizzakh as soon as he could. Although he was initially started off as an ordinary farmer, he was promoted in 1931 to head of livestock at the "10 Years of October" kolkhoz. Eventually he was elected chairman of the Malenkov kolkhoz (renamed to the Moscow kolkhoz in 1957) in 1944. There he worked on bringing up conditions on the farm, which was lagging behind its counterparts. The next year, the farm's yield of cotton, grain, vegetables, and dairy rose for the first time during the war. Having not only raised the production output but also overfilled the quota set by the government, and contributed most of their surplus earnings to the Victory Fund. Five years later the farm absorbed 15 nearby underperforming farms, raising the cotton yield in the areas affected from 17 to 35 centners per hectare. After the yield increased by six centners per hectare in 1956, the farm was awarded the Order of Lenin, and on 11 January 1957 Nosirov was awarded the title Hero of Socialist Labour for obtaining high and stable cotton yields.

In the early 1960s Nosirov changed the pay structure for farmers such that their earnings were tied directly to their yields, and brigades were tasked with self-financing. Later on in 1967 he initiated the farm's expansion into the unused "virgin lands", adding 300 hectares to the farmland. The scope of the farm's production was also diversified and targeted for improvement, including the animal husbandry sector. The output of alfalfa, corn, and beets increased in the 1970s, and the meat and dairy sector of the farm was made profitable. After Nosirov suggested the farm add pigs to the herd to raise for pork, the farm started producing pork in 1971. Yields of cotton and produce continued to grow, and on 20 February 1978 he was awarded a second gold star.

A member of the Communist Party since 1947, he served as a deputy in the Supreme Soviet of the Soviet Union from 1958 to 1962, as well as the Supreme Soviet of the Uzbek SSR, the Central Committee of the Communist Party of Uzbekistan, and other regional positions.

He died on 7 October 1978 in hospital after collapsing in a field.

== Awards ==
- Twice Hero of Socialist Labour (11 January 1957 and 20 February 1978)
- Five Orders of Lenin (16 January 1950, 11 January 1957, 8 April 1971, 10 December 1973, 20 February 1978)
- Order of the Red Banner of Labour (5 July 1950)
- Honored Cotton Grower of the Uzbek SSR (1966)
- various other medals

== See also ==
- List of twice Heroes of Socialist Labour
- Hamroqul Tursunqulov
- Tursunoy Akhunova
