= Basti Bagirova =

Azerbaijani cotton grower and politician (1906–1962)

- Bəsti Məsim qızı Bağırova
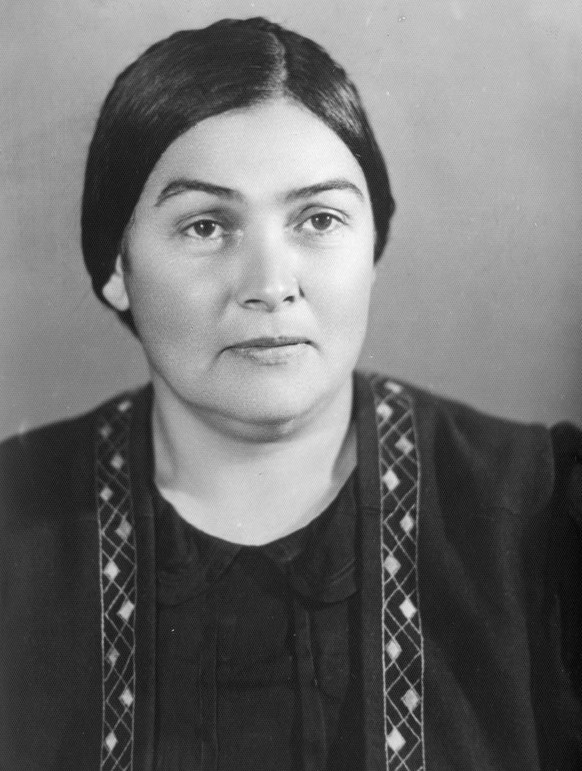
- Bagirova in 1940
- Born: 10 April 1906; Bağçakürd, Elisabethpol Governorate, Russian Empire
- Died: 27 February 1962 (aged 55); Bağçakürd, Goranboy District, Azerbaijan SSR, Soviet Union
- Education: Azerbaijan State Agricultural University
- Known for: Cotton production in Azerbaijan
- Political party: CPSU (1937–1962)
- Awards: Hero of Socialist Labour (twice)

Basti Masim gizi Bagirova (Azerbaijani: Bəsti Məsim qızı Bağırova; 10 April 1906 – 27 February 1962) was an Azerbaijani cotton grower and politician known for her high cotton yields. She was also the only Azerbaijani farmer to be awarded the Hero of Socialist Labour, other than Shamama Hasanova. Bagirova is known as one of the first Stakhanovites in the Azerbaijan SSR.

== Early life ==
Basti Masim gizi Bagirova was born into a peasant family on 10 April 1906 in the village of Abdulla-bek, Elisabethpol Governorate (now Bağçakürd), as one of nine children, although six died in infancy. Her father worked as a day labourer on a local estate, and died when Bagirova was a child. After his death, her mother tried to provide for the family by growing cotton, but was unable to acquire enough water from the estate owner.

At the age of fifteen, Bagirova had an arranged marriage. Following the Soviet Revolutions, she and her husband were given an ox, a cart and a plot of land to farm on.

== Work ==
Bagirova in 1937

When a kolkhoz (collective farm) opened in her home village in 1930, Bagirova was among the first to work there and was soon elected to the farm's Administrative Board, in addition to attending the Azerbaijan Agricultural Institute. On the farm, she also taught other farm workers how to obtain large cotton yields. In 1936, she averaged 464 kg of cotton harvested per day. In the following year, she was recognized for harvesting 120 centners of cotton per hectare, which was more than three times the amount typically considered a large harvest at that time. In 1953, Bagirova was elected as chair of the collective farm. She held this position until her death in 1962. As chairman, she implemented the "Hundred Centner Movement", which encouraged cotton farmers to pick a hundred centners per hectare.

On 19 March 1947, Bagirova was awarded the Order of Lenin. Three years later, she received the award again on 17 June 1950. Bagirova and Shamama Hasanova were the only Azerbaijani farmers to receive the award twice. Bagirova also received the Order of the Red Banner of Labour.

== Politics ==
In 1936, she contributed to the editorial commission arranged by the 8th convocation. Bagirova officially became a member of the Communist Party in 1937. She was a member of the Supreme Soviet of the Soviet Union from the 1st to the 3rd convocations. Bagirova was also a member of the Supreme Soviet of the Azerbaijan SSR during 4th and 5th convocations, and member of the Presidium during the 5th. She was a member of the Central Committee of the Communist Party of Azerbaijan. She was a delegate to the 20th Congress of the Communist Party of the Soviet Union and the XXIII, XXIV and XXV congresses of the Communist Party of Azerbaijan.

== Death and legacy ==
A bronze bust was erected in Bağçakürd in her honour. There is also a street bearing her name in the Yasamal district in Baku.

Bagirova died on 27 February 1962, at the age of 55.

== Awards ==
- Twice Hero of Socialist Labour (19 March 1947 and 17 June 1950)
- Three Orders of Lenin (19 March 1947, 10 March 1948, 17 March 1950)
- Order of the Red Banner of Labour (27 January 1936)
- Medal "For Labour Valour" (7 March 1960)
- Medal of the All-Union Agricultural Exhibition

== See also ==
- List of twice Heroes of Socialist Labour
- Shamama Hasanova
