= Shamama Hasanova =

Soviet-Azerbaijan cotton grower, poet

- Şamama Mahmudəli qızı Həsənova
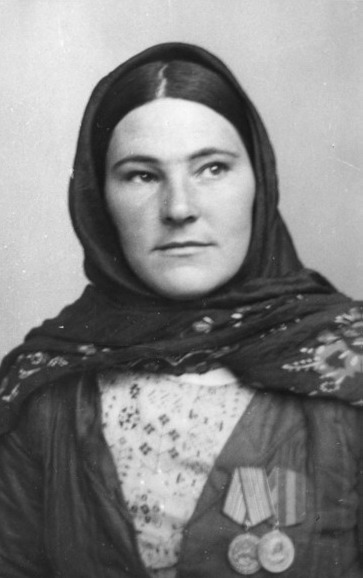
- Born: 7 November 1923; Arayatlı, Fuzuli District, Transcaucasian SFSR, USSR
- Died: 5 September 2008 (aged 84); Baku, Azerbaijan
- Education: Azerbaijan State Agricultural University
- Known for: Cotton production in Azerbaijan
- Political party: Communist Party of the Soviet Union (1946-1991)
- Children: 3
- Awards: Hero of Socialist Labour (twice)

Shamama Mahmudali gizi Hasanova (Note: Her name is also spelled as Shamama Gasanova) (Azerbaijani: Şamama Mahmudəli qızı Həsənova; 7 November 1923 – 5 September 2008) was an Azerbaijani cotton grower and politician, who was the chairman of the "1 May" collective farm in the Fuzuli District of the Azerbaijan SSR. She was the first Azerbaijani woman to be awarded Hero of Socialist Labor twice.

== Early and personal life ==
Shamama Mahmudali gizi Hasanova was born on November 7, 1923, in the village of Arayatlı, Karyaginsky Uyezd, Azerbaijan SSR (now Fuzuli District of Azerbaijan).

Hasanova's husband also managed a farm in addition to working as a lorry driver. They had three children together.

== Work ==
Hasanova began her agricultural career as a cotton picker, and from 1942, worked at the "1 May" collective farm of Karyaginsky District. At the farm, she led a Komsomol team. In 1947, she was awarded the Hero of Socialist Labour title for high crop yields, becoming the first cotton grower in the Soviet Union to receive this distinction. She was awarded the title again on June 17, 1950 for her accomplishments in agriculture, and she thus became the first woman in the Azerbaijan SSR to receive the award twice. The only other Azerbaijani farmer to receive that award twice was Basti Bagirova. Hasanova was also awarded the Order of Lenin medal, and received the Hammer and Sickle Gold Medal twice.

In 1953, she became the chair of the 1st of May collective farm.

In 1966, she graduated from the Azerbaijan State Agricultural University.

== Politics ==
Hasanova was a delegate to the 20th and 23rd Congress of the Communist Party of the Soviet Union. She also served as a deputy of the Supreme Soviet of the Soviet Union from the 4th to the 11th convocations. She served as vice-chair of the Soviet of the Union between 1960 and 1974. She was a member of the Central Committee of the Communist Party of Azerbaijan since 1955.

== Death and legacy ==
A bronze statue of Hasanova was erected in her native village of Arayatlı.

Hasanova was hospitalised on August 24, 2008. She died in hospital just over a week later on September 5, in Baku, at the age of 84.

== Awards ==
- Medal of the All-Union Agricultural Exhibition
- Hero of Socialist Labour (2 awards: 1947 and 1950)
- Order of Lenin (4 awards; 1947, 1948, 1949, 1976)
- Medal "For Labour Valour" (1970)
- Order of the Red Banner of Labour (2 awards: 1966, 1986)
- Order of the October Revolution (2 awards: 1971, 1973)

== See also ==
- List of twice Heroes of Socialist Labour
- Basti Bagirova
