= Galina Burkatskaya =

Ukrainian politician

Halyna Burkatska
- Born: 17 December [O.S. 4 December] 1916; Heronymivka, Kiev Governorate, Russian Empire (located within present-day Cherkasy Raion)
- Died: 15 March 2006; Kyiv, Ukraine
- Citizenship: Russian Empire → USSR → Ukraine
- Awards: Hero of Socialist Labour (twice)

Halyna Yevgenivna Burkatska (Russian: Галина Евгеньевна Буркацкая, Ukrainian: Галина Євгеніївна Буркацька; 17 December [O.S. 4 December] 1916 – 15 March 2006) was a Soviet activist of the collective farm movement, twice Hero of Socialist Labor (1951, 1958). Member of the Central Committee of the Communist Party of Ukraine in 1952-1966. Deputy of the Supreme Soviet of the USSR of the 3rd-6th convocations, member of the Presidium of the Supreme Soviet of the USSR (1958-1962). Member of the Central Audit Commission of the Communist Party of the Soviet Union (CPSU) in 1961-1966.

== Early life and education ==
Burkatska was born on 17 December [O.S. 4 December] 1916 in the village of Heronymivka (now Cherkasy district of Cherkasy region) in a poor peasant family. In 1932 she graduated from a seven-year school.

== Career ==
From 1933 to 1935, Burkatska worked as the secretary of the Heronymivka village council and the chairman of the Shelepukhiv village council of the Cherkasy district. From 1935 to 1937 she was an instructor in the organizational and mass department of the Cherkasy District Council of Workers' Deputies of the Kyiv Region.

From 1937 to 1938, Burkatska studied at the Komsomol branch of the Artem Ukrainian Agricultural Communist University in Kharkiv. Then she worked for the Komsomol in the Solonitsy school of the Kharkiv suburban district of Kharkiv region.

With the beginning of World War II, she was evacuated to the Saratov region, where from 1941 to 1944 she worked on the collective farm "Sickle and Hammer" Pervomaisky district of the Saratov region.

With the liberation of Ukraine in 1944, she returned to her native village. She worked as a foreman from 1947 as a secretary of the party organization, and from 1949 to 1967 she was chairman of the board of the Khrushchev collective farm (later - "Soviet Ukraine") in the village of Heronymivka, Cherkasy region.

In 1946, she became a member of the Communist Party of the Soviet Union.

In 1956, she graduated in absentia from the Faculty of Agronomy of the Ukrainian Agricultural Academy in Kyiv (today National University of Life and Environmental Sciences of Ukraine), where in 1967 she made a scientific report on improving the management system on the example of suburban collective farms. Based on the report, she was awarded the title of Candidate of Economic Sciences.

In 1961, she visited London as part of a Soviet delegation.

Since 1968, Burkatska was a senior lecturer at the Department of Labor Organization of the Ukrainian Agricultural Academy in Kyiv. She was also a member of the editorial board of the magazine "Krestyanka".

She was a Delegate to the 19th and 22nd Congresses of the CPSU. At the 22nd Congress of the CPSU, she was elected a member of the Central Audit Commission.

She died on 15 March 2006 and was buried in Baikove Cemetery.

== Works ==
- How we perform the main task in agriculture. K., 1953 («Як ми виконуємо головне завдання в сільському господарстві»);
- On the way to a steep rise in the economy. M., 1964 («По пути крутого подъёма хозяйства»);
- Improving the management system. K., 1967 («Совершенствование системы ведения хозяйства»).

== Awards ==
- Hero of Socialist Labor (18 May 1951 and 26 February 1958)
- Order of Lenin (18 May 1951)
- Order of the Red Banner of Labor (1948)
- Order of Princess Olga II (3 March 2006) - for significant personal contribution to the socio-economic and cultural development of Ukraine, active public activity, many years of hard work
- Order of Princess Olga III. (7 February 2001) - for fruitful public activity, significant personal contribution to the development of the veterans' movement
- Diploma of the Presidium of the Verkhovna Rada of the Ukrainian SSR (16 February 1966)

== Commemoration ==
A bronze bust of Burkatskaya was installed in her native village Heronymivka. On 10 September 2008 a memorial plaque was unveiled at the house in the village of Heronymivka, where she lived.

== See also ==
- List of twice Heroes of Socialist Labour
