= Alla Anorov =

- Born: 1907; Beshkaram village (located in present-day Achi, Aravan district, Osh region, Kyrgyzstan)
- Died: 8 December 1979 (aged 71–72); Achi, Aravan District, Kyrgyz SSR, USSR
- Awards: Hero of Socialist Labor (twice)

Alla Anorov (Note: Uzbek: Alla Anorov, Алла Аноров; Russian: Алля Анаров, romanized: Allya Anarov.) (1907 — 8 December 1979) was a cotton farmer and kolkhoz movement activist in the Kyrgyz SSR who was twice awarded the title Hero of Socialist Labor for record harvests. In addition to his work in agriculture he held positions in the Supreme Soviet of the USSR and Supreme Soviet of the Kyrgyz SSR.

== Biography ==
Anorov was born in 1907 to a large Uzbek family of impoverished farm workers in Beshkaram village, now Achchi. Originally he worked as a farm worker under local aristocrats, but after the growth of Soviet power in the region he joined the collective farm movement, becoming one of the first people to join the Sassyk-Unkur collective farm in 1927. Previously illiterate, after entering a local education program he learned to read and write, and quickly developed an interest in reading. He continued to work in the cotton industry until his military service in the Red Army during World War II. Upon returning to home, he went back to work at the collective farm named after Molotov, and soon achieved high yields, reaching a level of 97.97 centners per hectare in 1947. For such harvest, he was awarded the title Hero of Socialist Labor on 26 March 1948. In subsequent years the farm continued to see high yields, albeit somewhat lower, totaling 100.9 centners per hectare in 1948, 88.5 centners per hectare in 1949, and 74.5 centners per hectare in 1950. For those harvests he was awarded the title Hero of Socialist Labor again on 28 April 1951.

After becoming a double Hero of Socialist Labor he continued to work at the farm, which was later renamed to the Voroshilov collective farm, and then the Communism collective farm; from 1951 to 1962 he worked as a foreman of a cotton-growing brigade, and from then to 1967 he was a field worker. He then joined the recently established Pakhtachi sovkhoz, formed as part of the virgin lands development campaign, which he worked at until 1968.

A member of the Communist Party since 1939, he was a deputy of the Supreme Soviet of the USSR from 1958 to 1962, and from 1951 to 1959 he was a deputy of the Supreme Soviet of the Kyrgyz SSR.

Having retired in 1969, he died on 8 December 1979 and was buried in the Intifak cemetery. His older brother Hayitboy was also a Hero of Socialist Labor.

== Awards ==
- Hero of Socialist Labor (26 March 1948 and 28 April 1951)
- Five Order of Lenin (31 January 1941, 26 March 1948, 16 May 1949, 1 July 1950, 15 February 1957)
- Order of the Red Star (9 June 1947)
- various other medals

== See also ==
- List of twice Heroes of Socialist Labour
