= Tursunoy Akhunova =

- Турсуной Ахунова; Tursunoy Oxunova
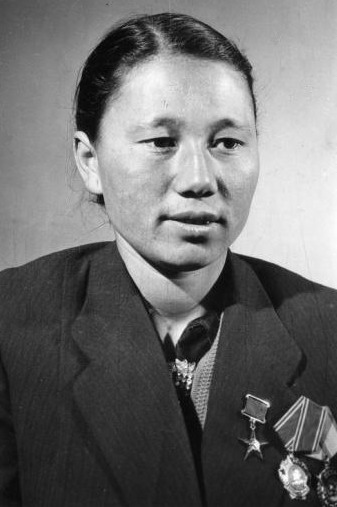
- Akhunova in 1962
- Born: May 20, 1937; Pakhta village, Chinoz District, Uzbek SSR, USSR
- Died: September 21, 1983 (aged 46); Uzbek SSR, USSR
- Citizenship: Soviet Union
- Awards: Hero of Socialist Labor (twice); Lenin Prize

Tursunoy Makhmudovna Akhunova (Russian: Турсуной Махмудовна Ахунова, Uzbek: Tursunoy Oxunova; 20 May 1937 — 21 September 1983) was one of the first Soviet Uzbek women cotton harvester drivers as well as recipient of the title Hero of Socialist Labor in 1959 and 1978 for high cotton yields. A member of the Communist Party since 1962 and a prominent initiator for mechanization of the cotton harvest, she became a prominent figure in Uzbekistani politics, serving in the Supreme Soviet of the USSR of the 6th-8th convocations from 1962 to 1974 and well as the Presidium of the Supreme Soviet.

== Early life ==
Akhunova was born on 20 May 1937 to an Uzbek family in Pakhta village, near Tashkent. After completing her eighth grade of school she went on to attend the Karasu School of Agricultural Mechanization in Osh, Kyrgyz SSR, which she graduated from in 1954 as one of the first Uzbek women trained as a cotton harvester driver.

== Agriculture career ==
In 1954 Akhunova became driver of a cotton harvester on the collective farm named after S. M. Kirov in Chinaz district, Tashkent oblast. Although she only harvested 20 tons of cotton in 1955, below the average output of 30 tons per machine that was expected, she greatly improved her productivity over the years, reaching 210 tones of cotton picked in 1959. For her high productivity in cotton harvesting she was initially awarded the Order of Lenin on 14 December 1959, but soon on 25 December 1959 the decree was cancelled and replaced by an awarding of the title Hero of Socialist Labor with the Order of Lenin. She was then promoted to the position of brigade foreman at the collective farm, where she initiated mechanization of all other parts of cotton production. In 1962 she became a deputy of the Supreme Soviet, and held that office until 1974. In 1967 she received the Lenin prize for her role in introduction of a four-row cotton harvester. Eventually on 20 February 1978 she was another Hero of Socialist Labor gold star for her achievements in All-Union Labor competition and successful implementation of plans to increase cotton production. She continued to work as a brigade foreman at the collective farm until her health deteriorated to the point she could not work anymore. Throughout her life she was a strong advocate for more Uzbek women taking up work as cotton harvester drivers, and was frequently featured in Uzbek newspapers. She died on 21 September 1983 after a long illness.

== Awards ==
- Twice Hero of Socialist Labor (25 December 1959 and 20 February 1978)
- Three Order of Lenin (25 December 1959, 14 February 1975, and 20 February 1978)
- Order of the Red Banner of Labor (11 January 1957)
- Medal "For Distinguished Labour" (1 March 1965)
- Lenin Prize (1967)
