= Ulyana Barkova =

Russian farm worker (1906–1991)

- Улья́на Спиридо́новна Барко́ва
- Ulyana Barkova by Max Alpert
- Born: Ulyana Spiridonovna Barkova; 3 January 1906; Viatchanovo, Yaroslavl Governorate, Russian Empire
- Died: 11 May 1991 (aged 85)
- Burial place: Poddubnoye
- Awards: Hero of Socialist Labour (1948, 1951); Order of Lenin (1948, 1949, 1950)

Ulyana Spiridonovna Barkova (Russian: Улья́на Спиридо́новна Барко́ва; 3 January 1906 [O.S. 21 December 1905] – 11 May 1991) was a Russian dairy farmer who was the forewoman at the Karavaevo state farm in the Kostroma Oblast who was twice awarded the title of Heroine of Socialist Labour.

== Early life ==
Ulyana Spiridonovna Barkova was born on 3 January 1906 [O.S. 21 December 1905] in the village of Viatchanovo, Yaroslavl Governorate (now Danilovsky District, Yaroslavl Oblast). She was orphaned aged eleven and resorted to begging along with her younger brothers to feed themselves until they were sent to an orphanage.

== Career ==
Following the October Revolution, Barkova began working for hire in her home village. She reported to the Karavaevo state farm office in 1925, and was put to work as a field worker. Barkova then worked her way up through the ranks as an assistant shopkeeper and a cowherder before becoming a milkmaid on the livestock farm. Specialists had specifically bred the farm's cows to be healthier, produce more milk and withstand the cold weather. In 1937, the farm workers were tasked with yielding the most milk possible from each cow. She was assigned to Poslushnitsa II in January, who had calved for the sixth time. During the first week after calving, the cow produced over 80 litres of milk. A month later, Barkova was milking Poslushnitsa II seven times a day which yielded 60 litres a day. Overall, Barkova milked 16, 262 litres during the lactation period, a world record, which was only broken in 1974. The same year, she was awarded a gramophone and a suit and coat worth 2,500 roubles for obtaining a milk yield of 8,655 litres per feed cow.

Barkova received a limited education and was illiterate, until she completed the likbez literacy courses in 1935. In 1939, she presented a paper at the All-Union Agricultural Exhibition, and was one of the first in the country to earn a milking master's certificate. She also received several medals from the exhibition. Barkova was a member of the All-Union Central Council of Trade Unions from 1937 to 1940 and a member of the Communist Party of the Soviet Union from 1941.

In 1943, Barkova was appointed as the foreman of a livestock farm. By 1947, each cow in her herd was producing an average of 6,047 kg of milk and 224 kg of butterfat. Due to her high level of productivity, she was awarded the title of Heroine of Socialist Labour and received the Order of Lenin in 1948. Barkova continued to achieve high milk yields in the subsequent years, earning another Order of Lenin in both 1949 and 1950. Since she received the Order of Lenin for three consecutive years, she became eligible for a second Heroine of Socialist Labour title, which she received on 3 December 1951.

== Later life and death ==
On 21 August 1960, a bust of Barkova was one of six that were erected in Karavaevo to honour individuals who had earned two Hero of Socialist Labor medals. After receiving a pension in December 1961, she continued to live in Karavaevo.

Barkova died on 11 May 1991, at the age of 85. She was buried in the Poddubnoye village cemetery.
