= Poland–Uzbekistan relations =

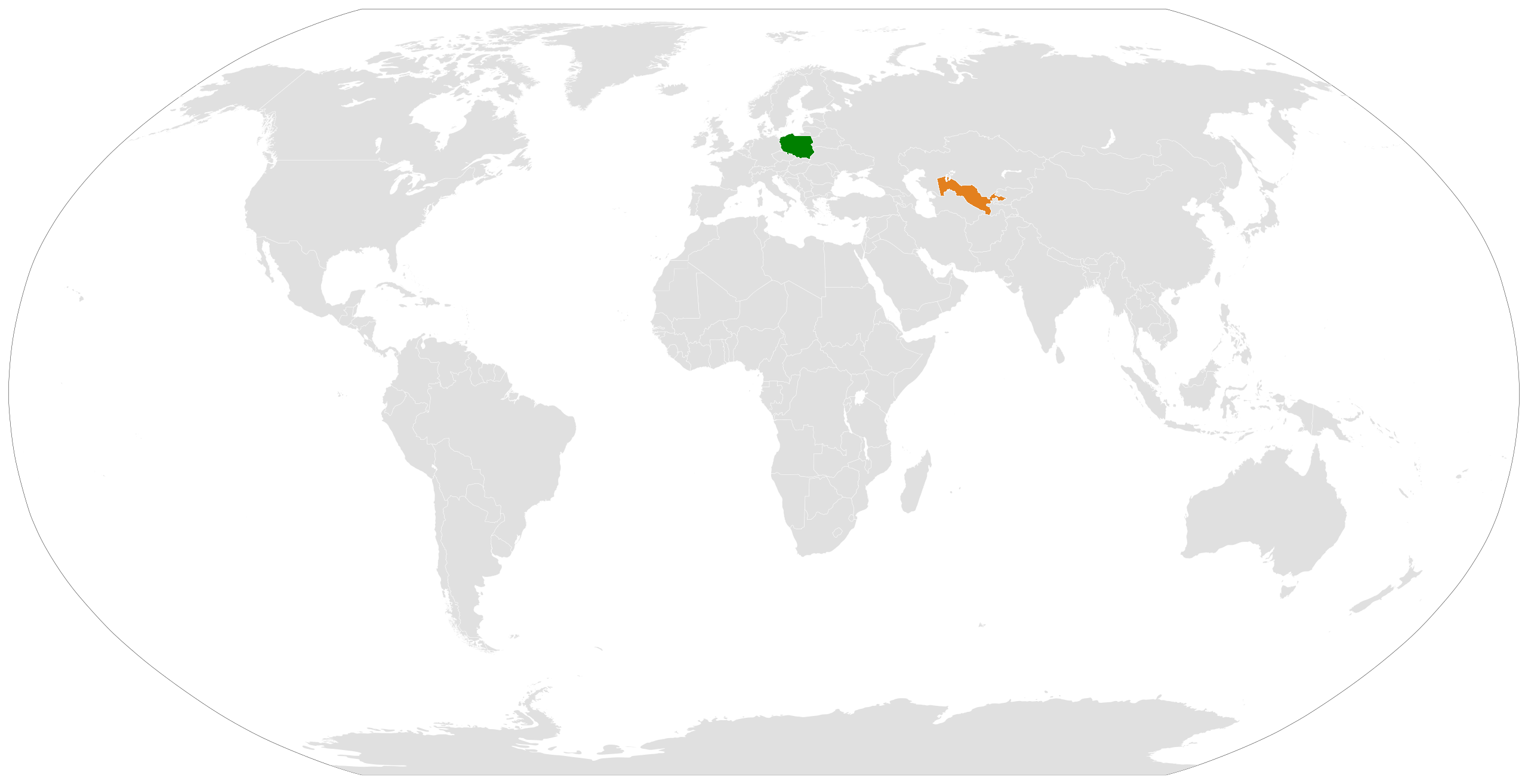

- Poland: Uzbekistan

Poland–Uzbekistan relations are the bilateral relations between Poland and Uzbekistan. The countries enjoy good relations, based on growing trade, and political and educational cooperation. Both nations are full members of the OSCE and United Nations.

== History ==
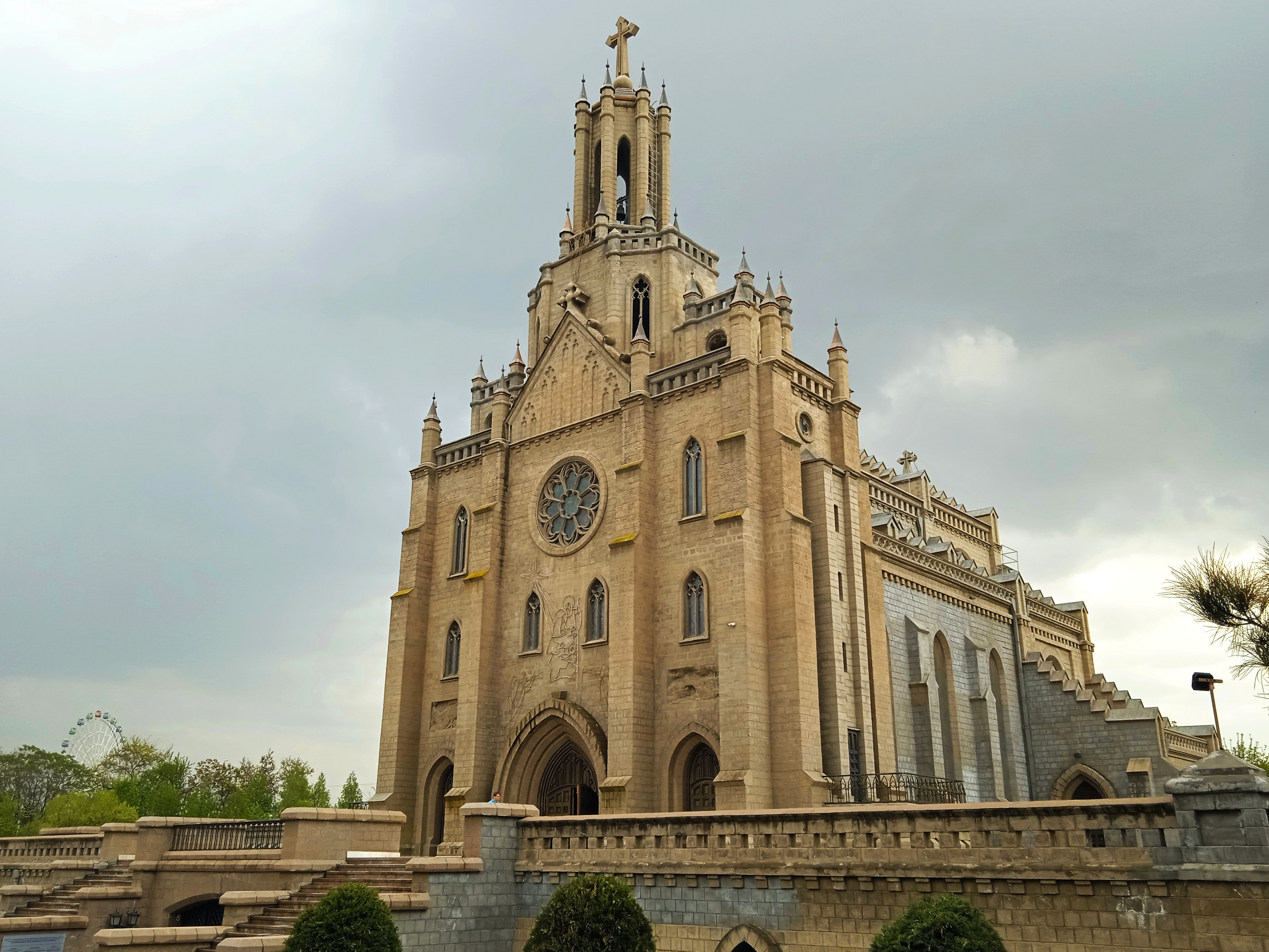
Sacred Heart Cathedral, Tashkent, also known as the Polish Church

There are several historical similarities between Poland and Uzbekistan. Since the Late Middle Ages, both nations formed the preeminent states of their regions, i.e., East-Central Europe and Central Asia, where cities flourished as learning (chiefly Kraków and Bukhara), cultural and political centers, reflected in magnificent architecture, with some, such as Kraków, Toruń, Warsaw, Samarkand and Bukhara, now listed as UNESCO World Heritage Sites. Both the Poles and Uzbeks endured several foreign invasions, including Russian, and their states declined in the 18th century, to eventually lose their independence to Russia. Poland was divided by Russia, Austria and Prussia (later Germany) in the Partitions of Poland, whereas the Uzbek khanates were conquered by Russia. Russian-controlled Uzbek territory was one of the places to which Poles were either deported as political prisoners from the Russian Partition of Poland or were sent after being conscripted to the Russian Army. The Poles built the Sacred Heart Cathedral in Tashkent, also known as the Polish Church, now a cultural heritage site of the Uzbek capital.

During World War I, ethnic Polish conscripts and legionnaires from the Austrian and German armies were held by the Russians in a prisoner-of-war camp in Fergana. They made contact and received help from the local Polish minority, however, many of the Polish prisoners died due to the harsh conditions and typhus epidemic. After the war, Poland regained independence and then successfully repelled a Soviet invasion, however, the Uzbeks fell under Soviet rule. Polish POWs were released from Uzbekistan only after the Treaty of Riga in 1921.

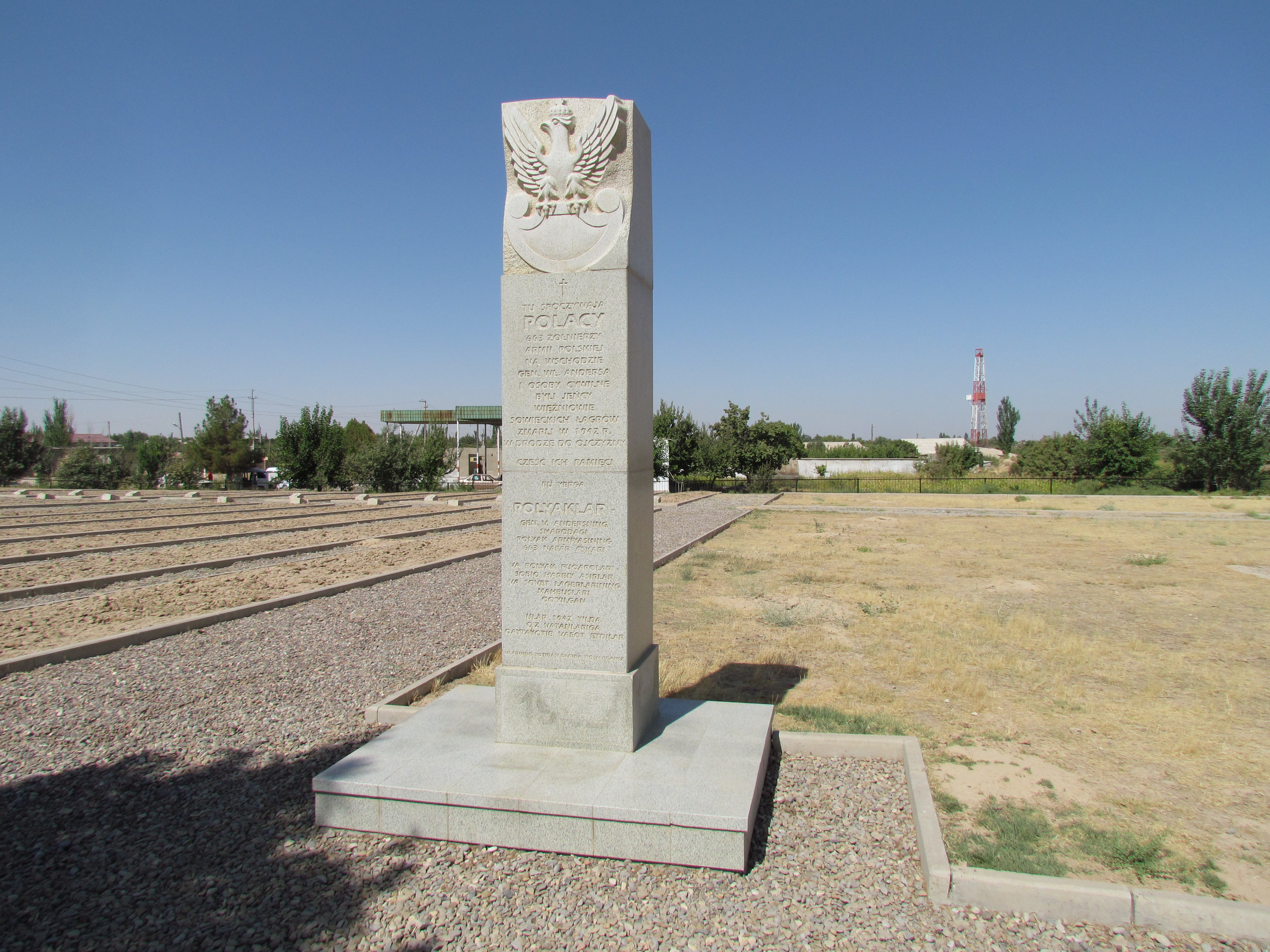
Polish War Cemetery in Gʻuzor

Following the joint German-Soviet invasion of Poland, which started World War II in 1939, the Uzbek Soviet Socialist Republic was one of the destinations for the deportations of Poles from Soviet-occupied eastern Poland. After the Sikorski–Mayski agreement, a Polish diplomatic post was established in Tashkent in 1941, and then relocated to Samarkand in March 1942, leaving Władysław Bugajski as a representative of Poland in Tashkent. In early 1942, the Polish Anders' Army along with thousands of civilians was relocated to the Uzbek and Kyrgyz SSRs, and Gʻuzor became the organizational center of the army. The Poles suffered from epidemics and famine, so they opened temporary feeding centers, orphanages, clinics and small hospitals, yet 2,500 soldiers and many more civilians still died. A remnant of this period are Polish military cemeteries located in 15 cities in Uzbekistan, including Chiroqchi, Gʻuzor, Jizzakh, Karmana, Kenimekh, Kitob, Margilan, Olmazor, Qarshi, Shahrisabz, Tashkent, Yakkabogʻ, Yangiyoʻl. Since mid-1942, the Soviets thwarted Polish efforts to improve the situation, and carried out arrests of the staff of the Polish diplomatic posts, first Władysław Bugajski in Tashkent in May 1942, and then the staff of the post in Samarkand in July 1942, and then seized and closed the post. In 1942, the Anders' Army with many civilians was evacuated to Iran. As of 1943, there were still over 25,000 Polish citizens in Uzbekistan, according to Soviet data. After the war, over 32,000 Poles were repatriated from the Uzbek SSR to Poland in 1946–1948.

Poland recognized Uzbekistan shortly after the Uzbek declaration of independence, and bilateral relations were established in 1992. Several agreements were signed in 1995, including a double tax avoidance agreement, a friendship and cooperation treaty and a cultural cooperation agreement.

== Modern relations ==
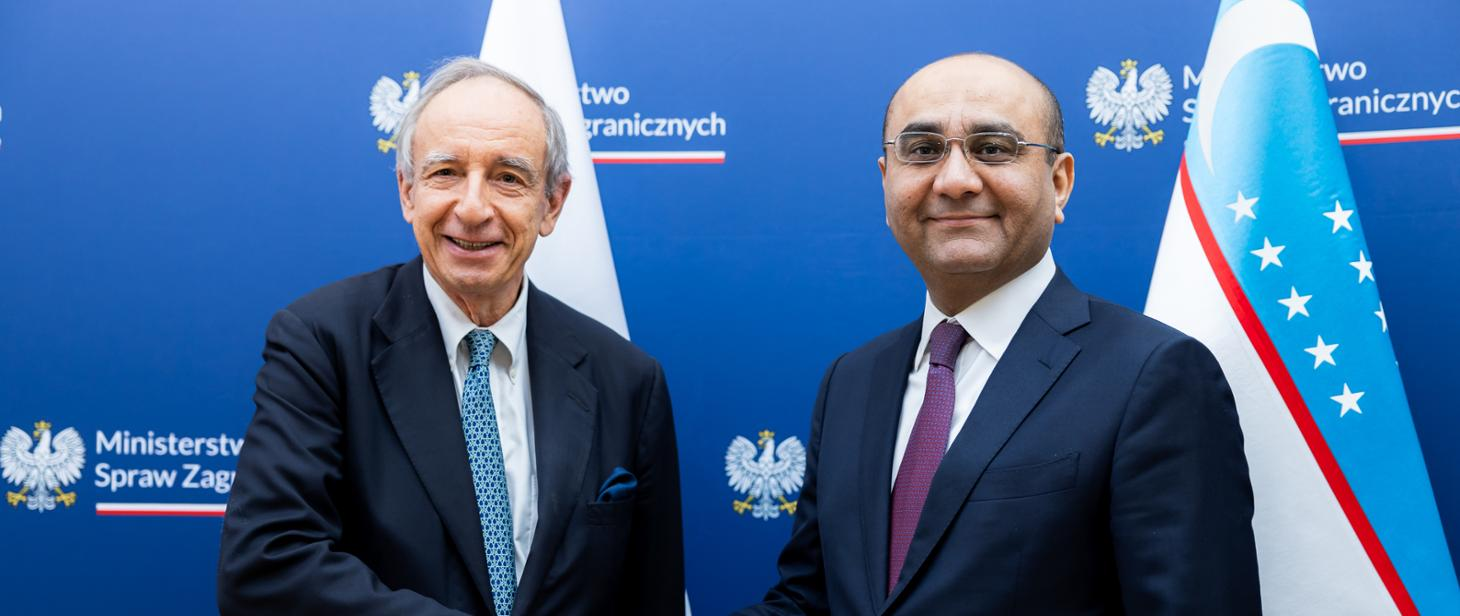
Deputy ministers of foreign affairs Władysław Teofil Bartoszewski and Muzaffarbek Madrahimov in Warsaw in 2024

In August 2021, during the 2021 Taliban offensive in Afghanistan, Uzbekistan helped Poland evacuate over 1,200 people, including Polish nationals, from Afghanistan. In September 2021, Poland donated over 250,000 COVID-19 vaccines to Uzbekistan.

Uzbekistani students were the sixth largest group of foreign students in Poland in 2021, the seventh largest in 2022 and the eighth largest in 2023 and 2024, at the same time being the largest group from Central Asia.

In 2023, a Polish–Uzbekistani Historical Commission was established by the Sybir Memorial Museum in Białystok, Museum of the Second World War in Gdańsk and National University of Uzbekistan in Tashkent to facilitate the research and popularization of the shared history of the two nations.

== Diplomatic missions ==
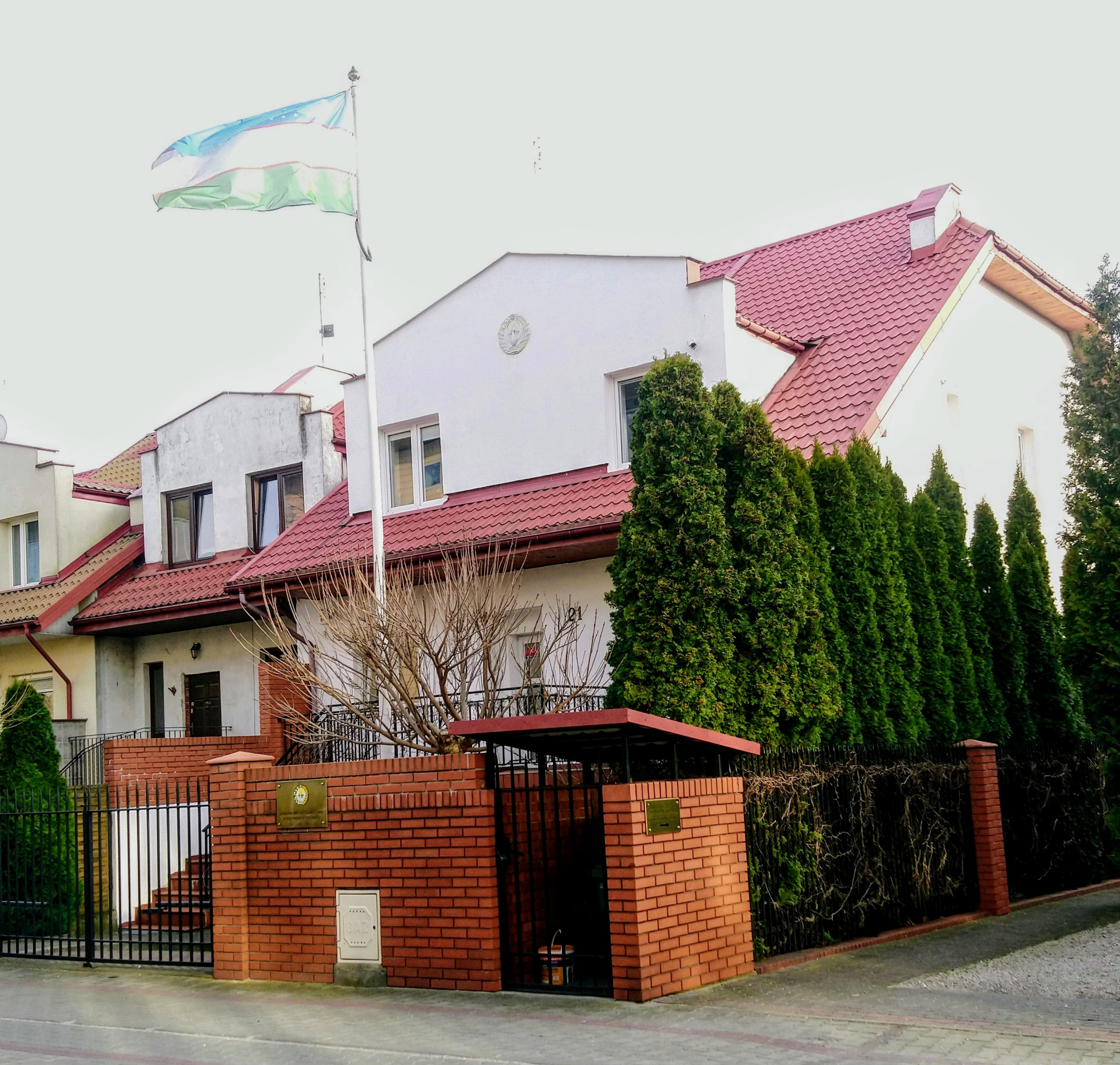
Embassy of Uzbekistan in Warsaw

- Poland has an embassy in Tashkent.
- Uzbekistan has an embassy in Warsaw and an honorary consulate in Poznań.

== See also ==
- Foreign relations of Poland
- Foreign relations of Uzbekistan
- Poles in Uzbekistan
