= Yevdokiya Grekhova =

Milkmaid and livestock foreman

Yevdokiya Isaevna Grekhova (Russian: Евдокия Исаевна Грехова; 23 February [O.S. 10 February] 1907 — 31 March 1992) was a milkmaid and livestock foreman on the "Karavaevo" farm who was twice awarded the title Hero of Socialist Labour. There is a bust in her memory in the village of Karavaevo.

== See also ==
- List of twice Heroes of Socialist Labour
