= Jabay Balimanov =

Twice Hero of Socialist Labour

- Kazakh: Жабай Балиманов
- Born: 1893; Karakamysh village (located in present-day Aktobe Region, Kazakhstan)
- Died: 6 August 1966 (aged 72–73); Uzbek SSR, USSR
- Citizenship: Russian Empire → Soviet Union
- Awards: Twice Hero of Socialist Labour; Order of Lenin; Order of the Badge of Honour

Jabay Balimanov (Note: Also transliterated as Dzhabay Balimanov and Dzhabai Balimanov.) (Kazakh: Жабай Балиманов; Uzbek: Jabay Balimanov, Жабай Балиманов; Russian: Джабай Балиманов; 1893–6 August 1966) was a Soviet shepherd and Karakul craftsman. During most of his life he worked on the Oqtov (Note: Also spelled Aktau.) collective farm in the Bukhara Region of present-day Uzbekistan.

Balimanov received the title Hero of Socialist Labour twice, a rare accomplishment in the Soviet Union. He was also elected to the Supreme Soviet of the Uzbek Soviet Socialist Republic and the Soviet of the Bukhara Region.

== Life ==
Balimanov was born sometime in 1893 to a Kazakh family in Karakamysh village. He worked in forestry in the Karakalpak ASSR starting in 1920 before moving to the Bukhara Region of the Uzbek SSR in 1928. Balimanov died on 6 August 1966 at the age of 73.

== Work ==
Balimanov became a shepherd on the Yusupov collective farm, later renamed to Oqtov, in 1933, where he worked for most of his life. As a senior shepherd on the farm, Balimanov had a very successful year in 1950, with 86% of lamb skins categorized as first grade, and produced 127 lambs for every 100 ewes. In 1957, he achieved an even higher yield – 132 lambs for every 100 ewes, and 94% first-grade lambskins. He continued to produce high yields, reaching 135 lambs for every 100 ewes in 1958 and 170 for every 100 ewes in 1963.

In addition to working as a shepherd, he helped train new young shepherds. Balimanov became a member of the Communist Party of the Soviet Union in 1947. He was elected to the Supreme Soviet of the Uzbek Soviet Socialist Republic and the Soviet of the Bukhara Region.

== Accolades ==
Balimanov was awarded the title Hero of Socialist Labour for the first time on 7 July 1951. He was awarded the title again on 6 August 1958, making him a double Hero of Socialist Labour. He was also awarded the Order of Lenin (which was awarded along with the Hero of Socialist Labour) and the Order of the Badge of Honour. A bust of him was installed in Oqtov village in Tomdi District of Navoiy Region in Uzbekistan.

== See also ==
- List of twice Heroes of Socialist Labour
