= Kim Pen Hwa =

Korean Soviet farmer (1905–1974)

- Ким Пён Хва 김병화
- Born: 6 August [O.S. 24 July] 1905; Chapigou village, Nikolsk-Ussuriysky, Primorskaya Oblast, Russian Empire (now Ussuriysk, Primorsky Krai, Russia)
- Died: 7 May 1974 (aged 68); Tashkent, Uzbek SSR, Soviet Union (now Tashkent, Uzbekistan)
- Occupation: Collective farm manager
- Awards: Hero of Socialist Labour (twice)

- Kim Pen Hwa
- Hangul: 김병화
- RR: Gim Byeonghwa
- MR: Kim Pyŏnghwa

Kim Pen Hwa (Russian: Ким Пён Хва, Korean: 김병화; 6 August [O.S. 24 July] 1905 – 7 May 1974) was the chairman of the collective farm 'Polyarnaya Zvezda' in the Uzbek SSR and twice Hero of Socialist Labour.

== Early life ==
Kim was born into a Korean peasant family in the village of Chapigou in the Primorskaya Oblast. His parents immigrated to Russia from the Korean Peninsula before he was born, and they were poor peasants without their own land. He helped his parents in running the farm and finished four years of a village school.

During the Allied intervention in the Russian Civil War, Kim fought as a partisan against the Japanese intervention forces during the Siberian intervention.

== Career ==
In 1927, Kim was called up for service in the Red Army. He graduated from the school of junior commanders and became an assistant to the platoon commander. In 1927 he joined the Communist Party of the Soviet Union and in 1929, he took part in the military operations of the conflict over the East China Railway. In 1930, he became the foreman of the company. Kim was sent to the Moscow Military Infantry School named after V.I. Lenin, which he graduated in 1932. He served as a company commander of the 76th Rifle Regiment of the 26th Kazan Rifle Division based in Yelabuga, Tatar ASSR.

In 1937, under the orders of Soviet leader Joseph Stalin, thousands of Koreans in the Soviet Far East were deported to Central Asia, supposedly to prevent further Japanese espionage. Further repressions against the Korean population of the Primorsky Krai occurred and as a result, Kim was arrested on July 14, 1938 on the accusations of being an alleged member of the nationalist Communist Party of Korea. In April 1939, the case was dropped for lack of corpus delicti and he was released. Kim was demobilized from the army.

=== Kolkhoz manager ===
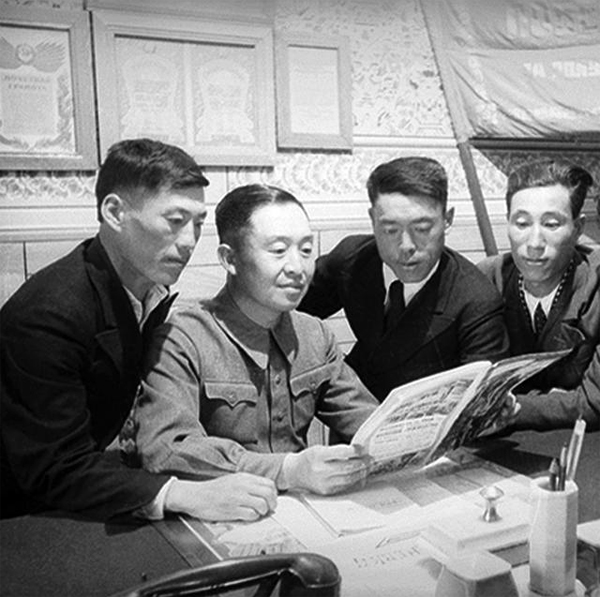
Kim Pen Hwa (second from left) with his colleagues (1940)

In 1940, Kim arrived in Uzbek SSR where majority of his relatives were deported. He began to work in the kolkhoz at the Srednechirchik District of the Tashkent Region as the head of the construction department. With his diligence, ability to mobilize people and other organizational skills, Kim won the respect of his fellow villagers and attracted the attention of the district party leadership.

In 1940, on the recommendation of the Srednechirchik District party committee at a general meeting of the collective farm 'Polyarnaya Zvezda', he was elected chairman of the collective farm. The collective farm was among the laggards, and the rice yield was low. In his new post, Kim's organizational talent was fully revealed. In the very first year of work on the collective farm, there were noticeable shifts: experienced personnel were invited, work was carried out to reclaim marshy lands, improve the irrigation system in rice fields. The average harvest of rice on the collective farm almost doubled, the first tons of cotton were obtained, which took a firm place in the structure of the collective farm. And from year to year the yield of agricultural crops increased.

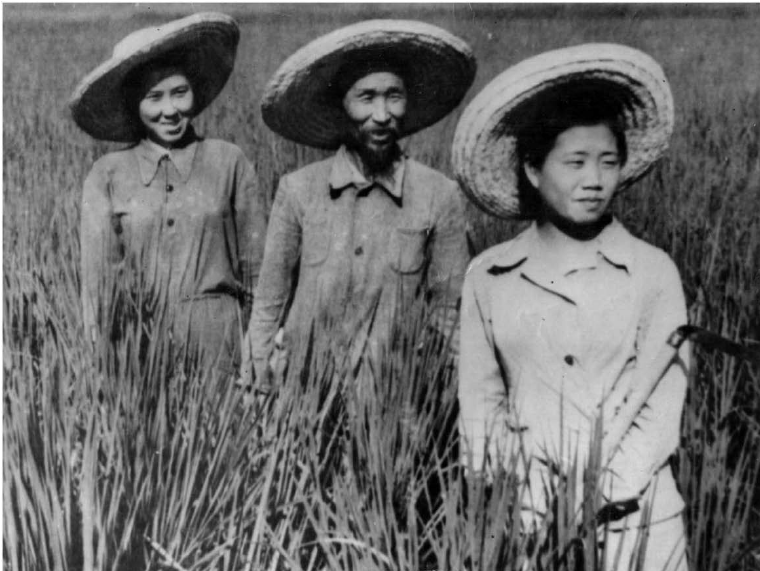
Deported Koreans from the Soviet Far East at a collective farm in Uzbek SSR (1937)

In an effort to increase raw cotton yields, the collective farmers introduced trap crops (alfalfa-cotton) system. Although it was condemned and rejected by the president of the VASKhNIL Trofim Lysenko, the system enriched the soil with organic matter, supportive extensive drainage work, and enabled the reclamation of fallows and tugay.

Following the outbreak of Operation Barbarossa in 1941, a fundraising campaign began in Uzbek SSR, and Kim's kolkhoz and other Korean kolkhozes played a big role in support of the Soviet war effort. The Soviet authorities also supported their efforts and willingness to adapt to the new reality, so they allowed the introduction of Korean publications, intellectual life and schools in stages. During World War II, when the food situation in Soviet Union became bad due to cutoff, the Polyarnaya Zvezda kohlhoz helped to solve the food problem in the Soviet Union by raising high productivity.

In the difficult post-war years, when Soviet Union experienced an acute shortage of food, the Kim's collective farm demonstrated a high level of labor productivity. Due to the skillful organization of work and a high awareness of the duty to society, the collective farmers received high yields. So on average, from one hectare to 27-34 quintals of rice to 80 quintals and all this in the absence of proper mechanization, fertilizers, and means for weed control. The indicators achieved by individual brigades and links of the collective farm in rice cultivation were very high even on a national scale. The Polyarnaya Zvezda kolkhoz, under the direction of Kim, has given cotton yields of 39.3 quintals per hectare (ha) in 1947 (165 ha), 39.18 in 1951 (285 ha), and 31.5 in 1967 (1,715 ha). Its rice yield was 36.4 in 1947 (364 ha), 39.2 in 1951 (480 ha), and 53.7 in 1967 (331 ha).

Kim headed the Polyarnaya Zvezda collective farm for over 34 years. His collective farm has always been distinguished from other farms by its organization and high labor productivity. In just 4 years of the seven-year plan, the plan for the production of raw cotton was overfulfilled by 6%, meat and wool - by 14%, plans for milk yield, for the output of pigs, sheep and poultry per 100 hectares of arable land were overfulfilled. Along with the growth of agricultural production as a result of successful farming, rational use of land and technology, and skillful combination of moral and material incentives resulted in the decrease of cost. In order to increase the material interest of collective farmers and reduce the cost of production in all brigades, cost accounting was introduced, units headed by tractor drivers were created, contracts were concluded between the brigades and the management of the collective farm.

== Later life ==
Kim was elected a deputy of the Supreme Soviet of the Uzbek SSR of the second and seventh convocations and for several years he was a member of the Commission of the Supreme Soviet of the Republic on agriculture.

Kim died on 7 May 1974 at the age of 68. He is buried at the Chigotay Memorial Cemetery in Tashkent.

== Honours and awards ==
- Hero of Socialist Labour (27 April 1948 and 26 August 1951)
- Four Orders of Lenin (27 April 1948, 15 May 1948, 13 June 1950, 11 January 1957)
- Order of the October Revolution (8 April 1971)
- Two Order of the Red Banner of Labour (23 January 1946, 16 January 1950)
- Order of the Badge of Honour (25 December 1945)
- other jubilee medals and awards from VDNKh.
- Honored Cotton Grower of the Uzbek SSR (1964)

== Memorials and commemorations ==
- A bronze bust of Kim was erected near a village at the Srednechirchik District at the Tashkent Region (in the farmstead of the Polyarnaya Zvezda collective farm). After his death, the Polyarnaya Zvezda collective farm was renamed to Kim Pen Hwa collective farm. In 1991 it was reorganized into the People's Corporation named after Kim Pen Hwa. In the farm, there is a memorial hall in honor of him.
- In Tashkent, one of the streets bore his name. Following the independence of Uzbekistan in 1991, it was renamed to Yangi Kuylyuk Street.
- In 1999, the grandson of Kim Pen Hwa, Robert Borisovich Kim, created the non-profit organization, Charitable Foundation named after Kim Pen Hwa.
- In 2005, at the 100th anniversary his birth, he was solemnly honored. He was honored again on the 110th anniversary of his birth in 2015.

== Selected works ==
- On Producing High Cotton Harvests (1953)
- On the Path to Abundance (1954)

== See also ==
- List of twice Heroes of Socialist Labour
- Koryo-saram
