= Zuurakan Kaynazarova =

Zuurakan Kaynazarova (Kyrgyz: Зууракан Кайназарова, Russian: Суракан Кайназарова; 18 June 1902 – 4 June 1982) was a Kyrgyzstani collective farm worker and politician during the Soviet era.

Kaynazarova was born in the village of Dzhalamysh in the Sokuluk District of Chüy Region in northern Kyrgyzstan. Her career as a farmworker began in 1929, and by the 1930s she was managing record numbers of beets in her harvests; in one year, 1947, she managed to harvest 15 hectares (37 acres) worth of beets. As a result, she was designated team leader for several beet farms in the Chuy Region. During World War II she worked to produce crops to aid the war effort, and took in a number of war orphans. Her abilities led Kaynazarova to receive a number of honors during her career. She received the Order of Lenin three times, in 1941, 1947, and 1948; in 1946 she was awarded the Order of the Red Banner of Labour, and in 1948 and 1957 she was named a Hero of Socialist Labour. As a member of the Communist Party of the Soviet Union she was a deputy to the Supreme Soviet of the Soviet Union; she also serve as a member and vice-chairman of the Supreme Soviet of the Kirghiz SSR. Kaynazarova retired in 1958 and died in 1982; in retirement she lived in Frunze, today Bishkek. She continues to be memorialized in her native country. A bust of her in pink granite was erected in Bishkek in 1975, along Dzherzhinsky (today Erkindik) boulevard. A high school in her home region bears her name, and she has been the subject of a documentary film; furthermore her birthday has been designated the day on which the work of rural women is recognized and honored.

== See also ==
- List of twice Heroes of Socialist Labour
