= Orconikidze =

Orconikidze may refer to:

- Orconikidze, Beylagan, Azerbaijan
- Orconikidze, Gadabay, Azerbaijan
- Orconikidze, Shaki, Azerbaijan
