= Heronymivka =

Heronymivka Геронимівка
- Village
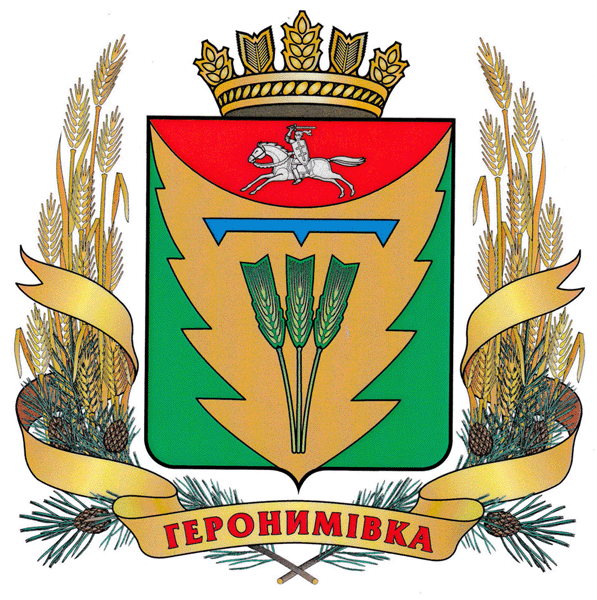
- Coat of arms

- Location within Cherkasy Oblast Location within Ukraine
- Coordinates: 49°27′07″N 31°57′47″E
- Country: Ukraine
- Oblast: Cherkasy
- Raion: Cherkasy

Population
  - Total: 2,988
- Website: Ukrainian Parliament website

Heronymivka (Ukrainian: Геронимівка) is a village (selo) in Central Ukraine. It is located in Cherkasy Raion (district) of Cherkasy Oblast (province) right next to the city of Cherkasy on its northwestern side and about 8 km (5.0 mi) away from the city's center. It belongs to Ruska Poliana rural hromada, one of the hromadas of Ukraine.

== History ==
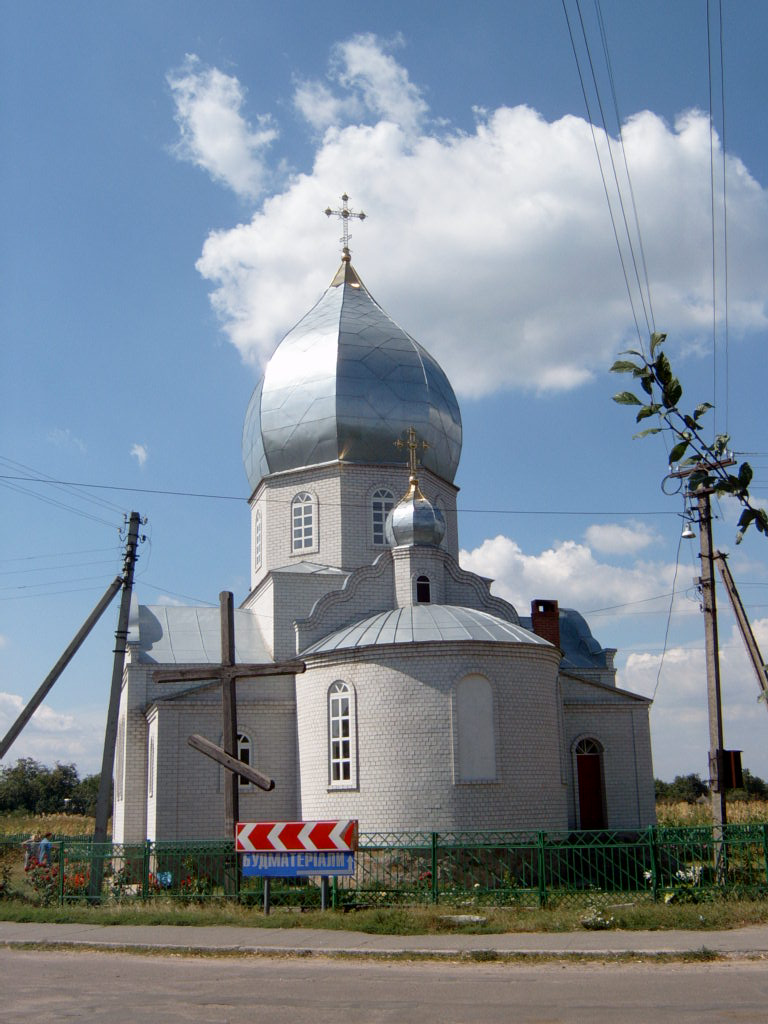
Orthodox church of 1856

The name of the village is related to the former Cherkasy starosta (elder) and Voivode of Volhynia Hieronim Janusz Sanguszko. According to the "Tales about populated localities of Kyiv Governorate" of 1864 by Lavrentiy Polkhylevych, it was founded sometime in the 18th century. Initially, it was a populated place (locality) next to Ruska Polyana and was referred to as Polyanka Malenka. Eventually, it was renamed after the aforementioned voivode.

On 31 December 1919, Heronymivka was taken over by the Soviet Red Army with the help of the Moshensky guerrilla squad led by Khyzhnyak. In 1921, in the village, was formed "committee of poor peasants" and in 1924 the village consumer association. The consumer association was a key sponsor of the local reading hall and school. In 1929, as part of the Soviet First Five-Year Plan, the association of mutual land lot cultivation was formed in Heronymivka. In 1930, in the village was established OGPU collective farm (kolkhoz) along with the Communist party cell.

During World War II, Heronymivka was occupied by Nazi Germany from 22 August 1941 to 17 November 1943.

The Soviet troops retook the village. Among the first liberators was a self-propelled battery (SU-122) commanded by Lieutenant Petro Vernyhora (a native of Tarashcha) who perished three days later near the Cherkasy train station and was later buried in Heronymivka. No less than 170 residents of the village fought against the Nazi Germany.

For quite some time, Halyna Burkatska played an important role in the village.

In 1950 OGPU kolkhoz merged with other artels of neighboring villages and was renamed as "Radianska Ukrayina" (Soviet Ukraine).

In 1982 kolkhoz was turned into a soviet farm.

== Population ==
=== Language ===
Distribution of the population by native language according to the 2001 census:

Language	Number	Percentage
Ukrainian	2 828	94.65%
Russian	154	5.15%
Other^{[a]}	6	0.20%
Total	2 988	100.00%

^{a} Those who did not indicate their native language or indicated a language that was native to less than 1% of the local population.
