= Yangi Chinoz =

- urban-type settlement
- Location in Uzbekistan
- Coordinates: 40°54′40″N 68°42′38″E
- Country: Uzbekistan
- Region: Tashkent Region
- District: Chinoz District
- Urban-type settlement status: 1992

Population (2005)
  - Total: 3,700
- Time zone: UTC+5 (UZT)

Yangi Chinoz (Uzbek: Yangi Chinoz/Янги Чиноз) is an urban-type settlement in Tashkent Region, Uzbekistan. It is part of Chinoz District. The town population in 2005 was 3700 people.
