= Chinoz =

- City
- Location in Uzbekistan
- Coordinates: 40°56′15″N 68°45′28″E
- Country: Uzbekistan
- Region: Tashkent Region
- District: Chinoz District
- Town status: 1972
- Elevation: 270 m (890 ft)

Population (2016)
  - Total: 23,700
- Time zone: UTC+5 (UZT)

Chinoz (Uzbek: Chinoz/Чиноз) is a city in Tashkent Region, Uzbekistan. It is the administrative center of Chinoz District. It has an altitude of 269 m above the sea level. Its population is 23,700 (2016).
