= Nurmolda Aldabergenov =

Nurmolda Aldabergenov (Kazakh: Нұрмолда Алдабергенов; 20 December [O.S. 7 December] 1906 — 17 November 1967) was a collective farm movement organizer in the Kazakh SSR who was twice awarded the title Hero of Socialist Labour.

== Biography ==
Aldabergenov was born to a peasant family either in the Malaysary village of Kopal County, or at the winter quarters of Zheldikar, depending on the sources (both places are located on the territory of modern Kerbulak district of Almaty region). An ethnic Kazakh, he originated from the Shaman band of the Zhalayyr tribe. He graduated the 4th grade of secondary school. He was orphaned at 12 years old. He began working at a young age to support himself and took part in the construction of the Turkestan–Siberian railway.

Nurmolda Aldabergenov worked as a collective farmer from 1930 to 1933, becoming a supervisor in 1934. In 1935 he was promoted to chairman of the collective farm of the "Zhanatalap" of Taldy-Kurgan region. At the start of his chancellorship, the farm consisted of 14 households and 28 able-bodied farmers who had at their disposal two single-meshed plows, one cart, five cows, two camels, three horses and twenty sheep. The collective farm turned into an advanced economy under the leadership of Nurmolda Aldabergenov in a short time - in six years the farm grew to have 2,000 sheep, 500 cows, and 100 horses. Aldabergenov also acquired tractors, mowers, and a car for the collective's use.

In 1940, he joined the CPSU. During World War II, he participated in the Great Patriotic War, being deployed to the front in 1942. He was discharged from military service in 1945. From 1945 to 1950, he again worked as the chairman of the collective "Zhanatalap" farm. Led by Aldabergenov, the collective achieved outstanding success in 1947, collecting 365 quintals of sugar beet and 13.7 quintals of grain, on a plot of 10 hectares, and a total of 834 quintals of sugar beet collected. The first power plant in Semirechye was built in 1947 by the initiative of Aldabergenov. Residential developments, a house of culture, a factory, a secondary school, a hospital, and kindergartens were built in the village of Mukyr during his leadership.

On March 28, 1948, by a decree of the Presidium of the Supreme Soviet, Aldabergenov Nurmolda was awarded the title of Hero of Socialist Labor with the order of Lenin and the gold medal "Hammer and Sickle" for obtaining high yields of sugar beet in 1947. From 1950 to 1965, he worked as the chairman of the collective farm named in honor of Stalin. On March 29, 1958, by decree of the Presidium of the Supreme Soviet of the USSR, Nurmold Aldabergenov was awarded a second gold medal "Hammer and Sickle" and the order of Lenin. From 1965 to 1967, Aldabergenov was assigned to head the lagging Karl Marx collective farm in the Andreevsky district of the Taldy-Kurgan region, increasing its yield to one of the leading collectives.

He was elected as a delegate of the XX Congress of the CPSU, a Deputy of the Supreme Soviet of the USSR of the 5th convocation (1958–1962), a Deputy of the Supreme Council of the Kazakh SSR of the 3-4 convocations. He was also elected a member of the Central Committee of the Communist party of the Kazakh SSR (for the 1954, 1956, 1960 elections).

== Memory ==
In 1959, the village of Chubar (now Aldabergenov village), erected a bust of Aldabergenov made by the sculptor H. Nauryzbayev, and the architect I. Tokyria. The bust was cast from bronze atop a four-sided stepped pedestal made of granite, the total height being 3.6 m. in 1982. The bust of Nurmolda Aldabergenov is included in the list of historical and cultural monuments of the Kazakh SSR of Republican significance and taken under state protection. In 1986, the Nurmolda Aldabergenov memorial Museum opened in the village.

== Literature ==
- Алма-Ата. Энциклопедия / Гл. ред. М. К. Козыбаев. — Алма-Ата: Гл. ред. Казахской Советской энциклопедии, 1983. — С. 91. — 60 000 экз.
- Казахская ССР / Гл. ред. Р. Н. Нургалиев. — Алма-Ата: Гл. ред. Казахской советской энциклопедии, 1988. — Т. 2. — С. 68. — ISBN 5-89800-002-X.
- Память народа
- Казахская ССР: краткая энциклопедия / Гл. ред. Р. Н. Нургалиев. — Алма-Ата: Гл. ред. Казахской советской энциклопедии, 1991. — Т. 4: Язык. Литература. Фольклор. Искусство. Архитектура. — С. 115. — 31 300 экз.
- Постановление Совета Министров Казахской ССР от 26 января 1982 года № 38 «О памятниках истории и культуры Казахской ССР Республиканского значения».
- Мемориальный музей Н. Алдабергенова. Дата обращения 20 сентября 2017.
