= Maria Savchenko =

Soviet agrarian and politician

Mariya Savchenko
- Born: Mariya Kharytonivna Savchenko; 27 April [O.S. 14 April] 1913; Tokari village, Lebedinsky Uyezd, Kharkov Governorate, Russian Empire
- Died: 12 May 2005 (aged 92); Lebedyn, Sumy Oblast, Ukraine
- Awards: Hero of Socialist Labour (twice); Order of Lenin (three)

Mariya Kharytonivna Savchenko (Ukrainian: Марі́я Харито́нівна Са́вченко, Russian: Мари́я Харито́новна Са́вченко; 27 April [O.S. 14 April] 1913 — 12 May 2005) was a milkmaid and politician from the Ukrainian SSR who was twice awarded the title Hero of Socialist Labour.

She was a member of the Supreme Soviet of the Ukrainian Soviet Socialist Republic.
