= Arayatlı =

- Municipality
- Location within Azerbaijan Location within Karabakh Economic Region
- Coordinates: 39°28′58″N 47°22′35″E
- Country: Azerbaijan
- District: Fuzuli
- Elevation: 147 m (482 ft)

Population
  - Total: 990
- Time zone: UTC+4 (AZT)

Arayatlı (also, Arayatly) is a village and municipality in the Fuzuli District of Azerbaijan. It has a population of 990.

== Notable natives ==
- Shamama Hasanova – Twice Hero of Socialist Labor.
