= Bağçakürd =

- Municipality
- Location within Azerbaijan
- Coordinates: 40°44′10″N 46°30′25″E
- Country: Azerbaijan
- Rayon: Goranboy

Population
  - Total: 1,597
- Time zone: UTC+4 (AZT)
  - Summer (DST): UTC+5 (AZT)

Bağçakürd (also, Bagçakürd, Badçakürd, Bakhchakyurd) is a village and municipality in the Goranboy Rayon of Azerbaijan. It has a population of 1,597.
