= Poddubnoye, Voronezh Oblast =

Poddubnoye Поддубное
- Selo
- Location within Voronezh Oblast Location within Russia
- Coordinates: 49°53′N 39°22′E
- Country: Russia
- Region: Voronezh Oblast
- District: Rossoshansky District
- Time zone: UTC+3:00

Poddubnoye (Russian: Поддубное) is a rural locality (a selo) in Zhilinskoye Rural Settlement, Rossoshansky District, Voronezh Oblast, Russia. The population was 523 as of 2010. There are 10 streets.

== Geography ==
Poddubnoye is located 50 km southwest of Rossosh (the district's administrative centre) by road. Zhilino is the nearest rural locality.
