= Hamroqul Tursunqulov =

Uzbek politician

- Ҳамроқул Турсунқулов
- Born: 12 March [O.S. 29 February] 1892; Vuadil village, Margilan district, Fergana Oblast, Russian Turkestan, Russian Empire
- Died: 9 August 1965 (aged 73); Yangiyoʻl District, Uzbek SSR, USSR
- Citizenship: Russian Empire; Soviet Union
- Awards: Hero of Socialist Labor (thrice)

Hamroqul Tursunqulov (Russian: Хамракул Турсункулович Турсункулов, Uzbek: Ҳамроқул Турсунқулов; 12 March [O.S. 29 February] 1892 – 9 August 1965) was the chairman of the prestigious "Sharqi Yulduz" kolkhoz in the Uzbek SSR and thrice Hero of Socialist Labor. A prominent leader of the collective farm movement in the Uzbek SSR, he held positions in politics in addition to his work in agriculture. He is the only thrice Hero of Socialist Labor who was not a senior party or military leader.

== Early life ==
Tursunqulov was born on 12 March [O.S. 29 February] 1892 to an Uzbek peasant family. During the Russian Civil War and Basmachi Revolt, he served in the 7th Cavalry Brigade of the Red Army as a reconnaissance scout. He distinguished himself in combat when he and a colleague saved their brigade commander, who had sustained a bullet wound, crawling under heavy enemy shell fire to reach him. Semyon Budyonny described Tursunqulov as a reliable and respected guide. After the end of the war he assisted in water and land reform before joining the NKVD to continue to fight the remaining Basmachi rebels. From 1922 to 1923 he was chairman of the Chimgan Executive Committee, and held several other regional posts before serving as director of the state economy of the Tajik SSR from 1930 to 1935.

== Agriculture career ==
In 1935 after most Basmachi attacks were suppressed, he relocated to the Yangilyul district in Tashkent, where he initially worked with the Brlyashu cotton artel, which previously harvested only 5 centners of cotton per hectare. Later that same year he became the chairman of a different artel, which would be renamed after Kaganovich and later the Sharq Yulduzi (Star of the East) farm. Originally it was expected that he would leave in a year just like the previous leaders of the farm. However, defying expectations, he stayed. At the time he arrived the farm was in poor shape: unploughed land had to be cleared, housing needed to be built, and irrigation systems were needed. Nevertheless, within five years the farm became incredibly successful, producing high yields of 40-46 centners per hectare. After achieving a record high yield of 88.65 centners per hectare in 1947 he received the title Hero of Socialist Labor for the first time.

The amount of land under the control of the farm continued to expand as other collective farms joined the one under Tursunqulov. Crop yields continued to fluctuate but over time grew to 90.3 centners per hectare in 1948, 39.4 centners per hectare in 1949, and 45.2 centners per hectare in 1950. For such yields he was awarded the title Hero of Socialist Labor again in 1951.

Eventually the last lagging collective farm joined the expanded collective farm in 1952, and that very year, the cotton yields for that area more than doubled from 11 to 26.5 centners per hectare. The collective farm named after Kaganovich grew to become the largest producer of cotton in the republic, with 1644 hectares dedicated to cotton production. In addition, the farm also produced meat, wool, silkworms, fruit, and vegetables, always fulfilling production quotas for those goods.

The farm became one of the first in the Uzbek SSR to use the square-pocket method for sowing cotton, enabling the use of mechanization in other processes, and thereby drastically reducing the amount of manual labor involved in the crop production. As result, the farm achieved high and stable yields of cotton, for which he was awarded the title Hero of Socialist Labor on 13 January 1957 for a third time. That year he celebrated his 65th birthday, but continued to visit other collective farms, and from 1958 to 1962 he was a member of the Presidium of the Supreme Soviet of the USSR. Previously he had been a delegate in the 10th, 11th, and 12th Party Congresses, and served as a deputy in the Supreme Soviet since 1946.

In 1963 he met Yuri Gagarin when Gagarin visited the kolkhoz while touring the Uzbek SSR.

After he died on 9 August 1965, he was buried in the Chigatay cemetery. The farm he led was soon named after him.

== Awards ==
- Thrice Hero of Socialist Labor (27 April 1948, 31 May 1951, and 13 January 1957)
- Six Order of Lenin (25 December 1944, 23 January 1946, 19 March 1947, 27 April 1948, 7 July 1949, 13 June 1950)
- Two Order of the Red Banner of Labor (6 February 1947 and 16 January 1950)
- Order of the Badge of Honor (1 March 1965)
- Medal "For Labour Valour" (25 December 1959)
