= Alexander Tselikov =

Soviet metallurgist, industrial machines designer, and Hero of Socialist Labor

Alexander Ivanovich Tselikov (Russian: Александр Иванович Це́ликов; 20 April 1904, in Moscow – 28 October 1984, in Moscow) was a Soviet metallurgist, industrial machines designer, and Hero of Socialist Labor (1964, 1984). He was elected a corresponding member of the Academy of Sciences of the USSR in 1953 and full member (academician) in 1964.
