= Cotton production in Azerbaijan =

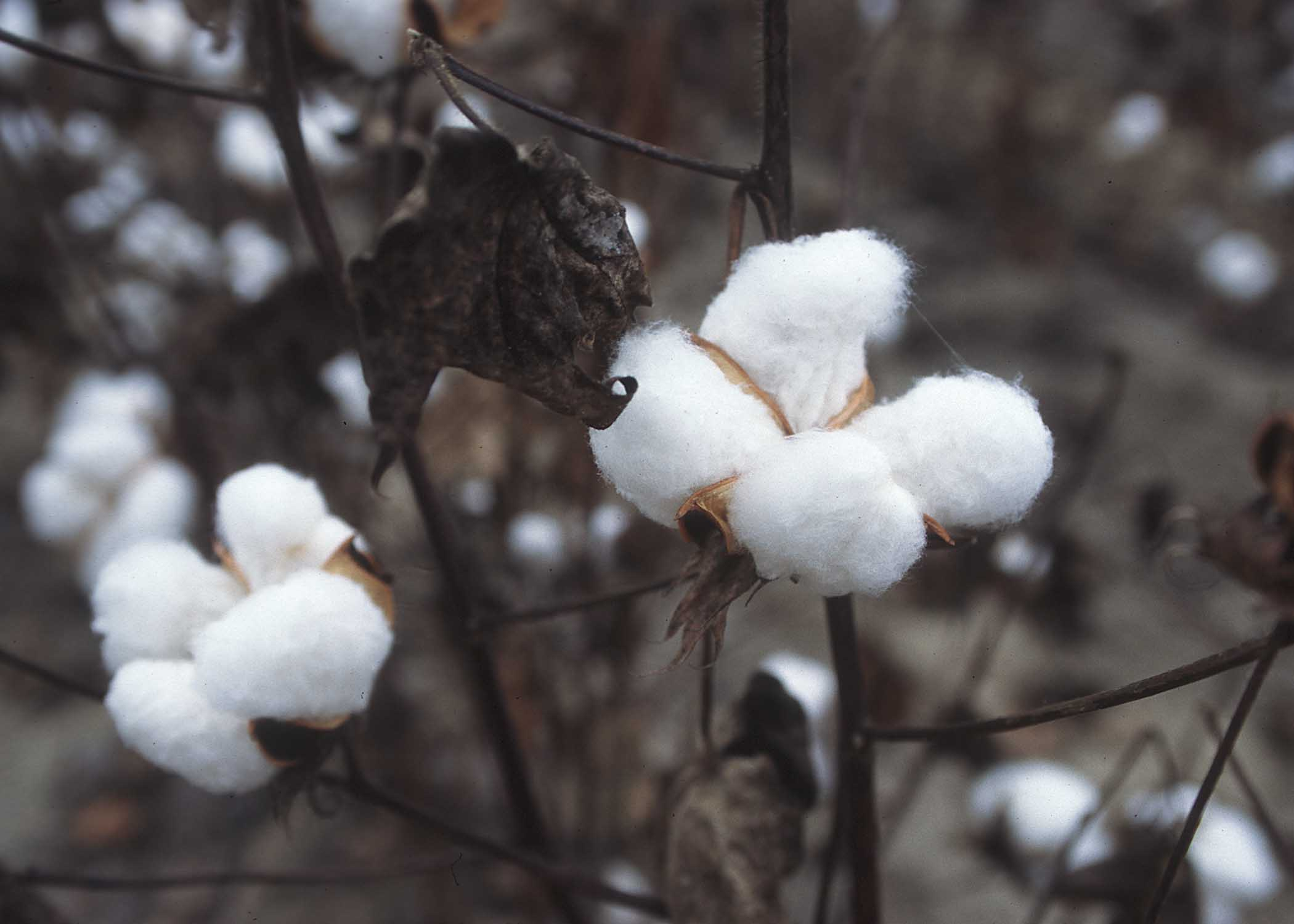
Cotton ready to be picked

Historically, cotton production in Azerbaijan has been crucial to the national economy, accounting for approximately 25% of agricultural revenue. It occurs mainly in the area west of the Caspian Sea. Historical records supported by archaeological excavations have established cotton growing in Azerbaijan to the 5th and 6th centuries AD. During the Soviet era, it was termed as the nation's "white gold". Since the fall of the Soviet Union and independence, cotton has significantly declined in output, given that oil and grains are more profitable for Azeri farmers.

Cotton production has become expensive in the country, as is evidenced from the fact that the operating expenses for its production in Azerbaijan are now about three times that in the United States; said to be US$300 per ha in Azerbaijan. The main reason for this high cost of production is attributed to the low yield of 1.5 tonnes/ha, a legacy from the Soviet Union. Modernization needs to be implemented to achieve yield levels of 3 tonnes/ha.

== History ==
=== Early history ===
Cotton has an ancient historical record as evidenced by archaeological excavations in Mingachevir where burned cotton skein and cotton seeds were unearthed dating to the 5th and 6th centuries AD. It has also been mentioned that Barda, Nakhchivan, Ganja, Shamkir and other cities in Azerbaijan exported textiles made of cotton. In the 15th century, cotton produced in Shamakhi was exported to Russia.

Cotton growing areas have generally been the Mil-Mugan and Shirvan plains, and Salyan-Mugan, Mil-Karabakh, Shirvan and Ganja-Qazakh in the central region. The high rate of cotton production in Azerbaijan can be observed in Beylagan, Zardab, Sabirabad, Saatli, and Barda regions. As new technologies advance together with the favorable climate and soil in Azerbaijan, the country currently has the capacity to reach the high levels previously experienced in the country.

New varieties of cotton such as the sorts from Mazandaran, Yerevan, Egypt and America were introduced in the 19th century. In the early 19th century, the country had 100,000 hectares (250,000 acres) under cotton, which produced about 65,000 tonnes. In the 19th century, travelers had noted that cotton as a summer crop, locally known as ṣayfī, was sown around April and harvested in dryer regions of Azerbaijan in October. The cotton grown was of the coarse short-staple variety. However, it was also noted that in view of high costs of transport, unacceptable cleaning processes and unreliable packing standards have resulted in decline of its demand in the markets of Europe. Subsequent to the collapse of American cotton exports in the 1860s, Azerbaijan became a large-scale cotton producer, often planted instead of food crops. Though farmers showed resistance to the policies of forced cultivation, it continued, nonetheless, with increases through the Russian Revolution. In the late 19th century, Russia tried to establish a supply of cotton by stimulating Azerbaijan cotton production through the gratuitous distribution of cotton-seed, but the climate proved to be less hospitable here than elsewhere.

=== Modern times ===
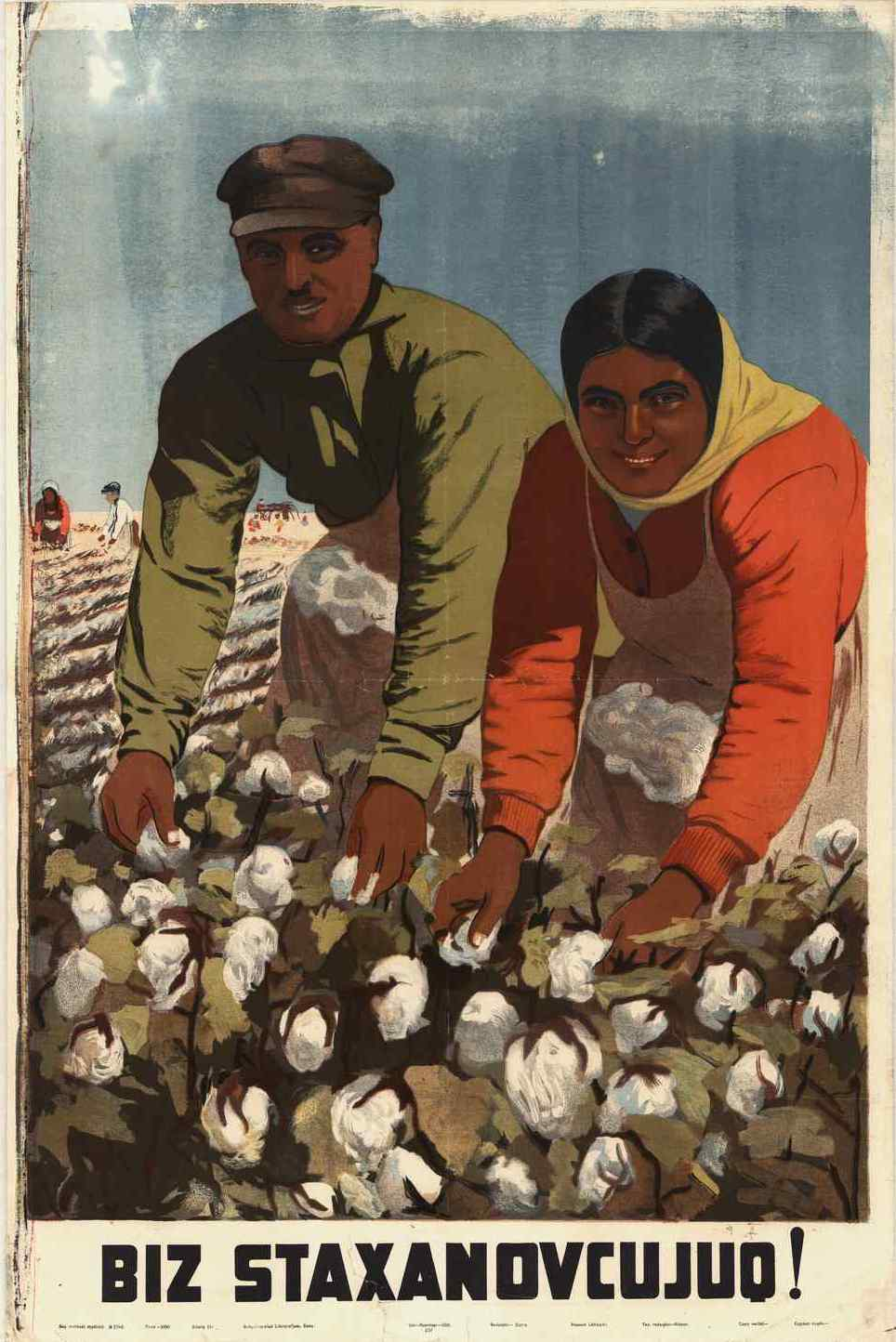
A 1936 Azerbaijani poster designed by Boris Ilyich Lebeshev, promoting Stakhanovite ideals

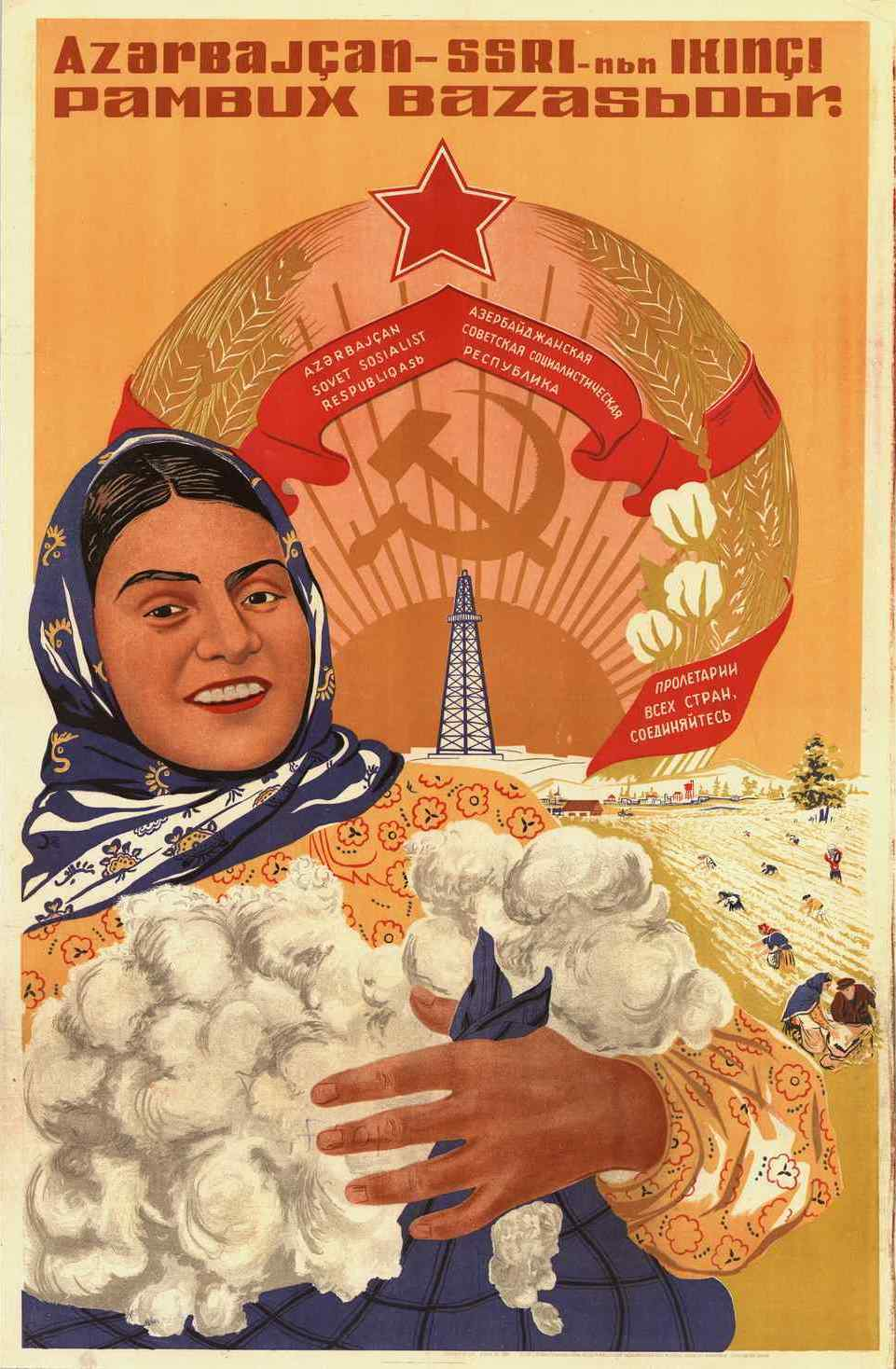
A 1937 Azerbaijani-language agricultural poster designed by E.M. Mirzoev

Production rose again with the central government's need for cotton at low, fixed pricing, leading to a doubling of land used for cotton production between 1920 and 1922. By the early 1930s, half of the country's cotton lands were collectivized.

The Azeri industrial magnate Zeynalabdin Taghiyev (d. 1924), founded Azerbaijan's first cotton mill. Hamida Javanshir (1873–1955), an Azeri female intellectual, organized employment for women at a cotton processing plant that she had established in Azerbaijan, and in 1912, she participated in the 13th Congress of the Cotton Producers of the Transcaucasus.

Until the late 1980s, Azerbaijan was one of the world's leading cotton producers, producing high yields of raw cotton up to 2.5 tonnes/ha and a gross annual production of 400–500 thousand tonnes. Azerbaijan has the necessary climatic and soil conditions to support such an industry and make it thrive. At peak, Azerbaijan produced 831,000 tonnes of cotton in 1981 and the cotton industry in Azerbaijan accounted for in excess of 25% of earnings from the plant industry in Azerbaijan. Since the beginning of 1987, major cotton sewing industries on collective and state farms, loss of cottons outlets due to low value and decentralization of cotton management to smaller, less knowledgeable farmers with a low level of agricultural provisions has resulted in a marked decline in the industry. Also, many firms underwent a transition into "variety mixing" such as Jekot and MKT by privatized cotton cleaning plants and widening their activities to distribute the allocated seeds, fuel, fertilizers, and other necessary items. Another reason for the decline has been conflict with the Armenians who, since the demise of the Soviet Union, have moved into parts of Azerbaijan.

In 1999, seed cotton production amounted to 101,000 tonnes, from a harvested area of 156,000 hectares (390,000 acres). Though cotton production has declined, cotton remained the country's largest cash crop into the decade of the 2000s, and while pesticides and insecticides are costly to the Azeri farmer, none of Azerbaijan's cotton is certified organic. On October 27, 2010, the price of Azeri cotton reached its highest level in over 140 years, attributed to bad weather in other countries that led to a decrease in cotton harvesting elsewhere.
According to the U.S. Department of Labor, the production of cotton in Azerbaijan owes much to child labor; and even though "the number of child laborers involved in the production of cotton [...] has considerably declined in the past decade", the 2014 TVPRA List of Goods Produced by Child Labor or Forced Labor issued by the Bureau of International Labor Affairs still classifies cotton as a good produced by child labor in Azerbaijan.

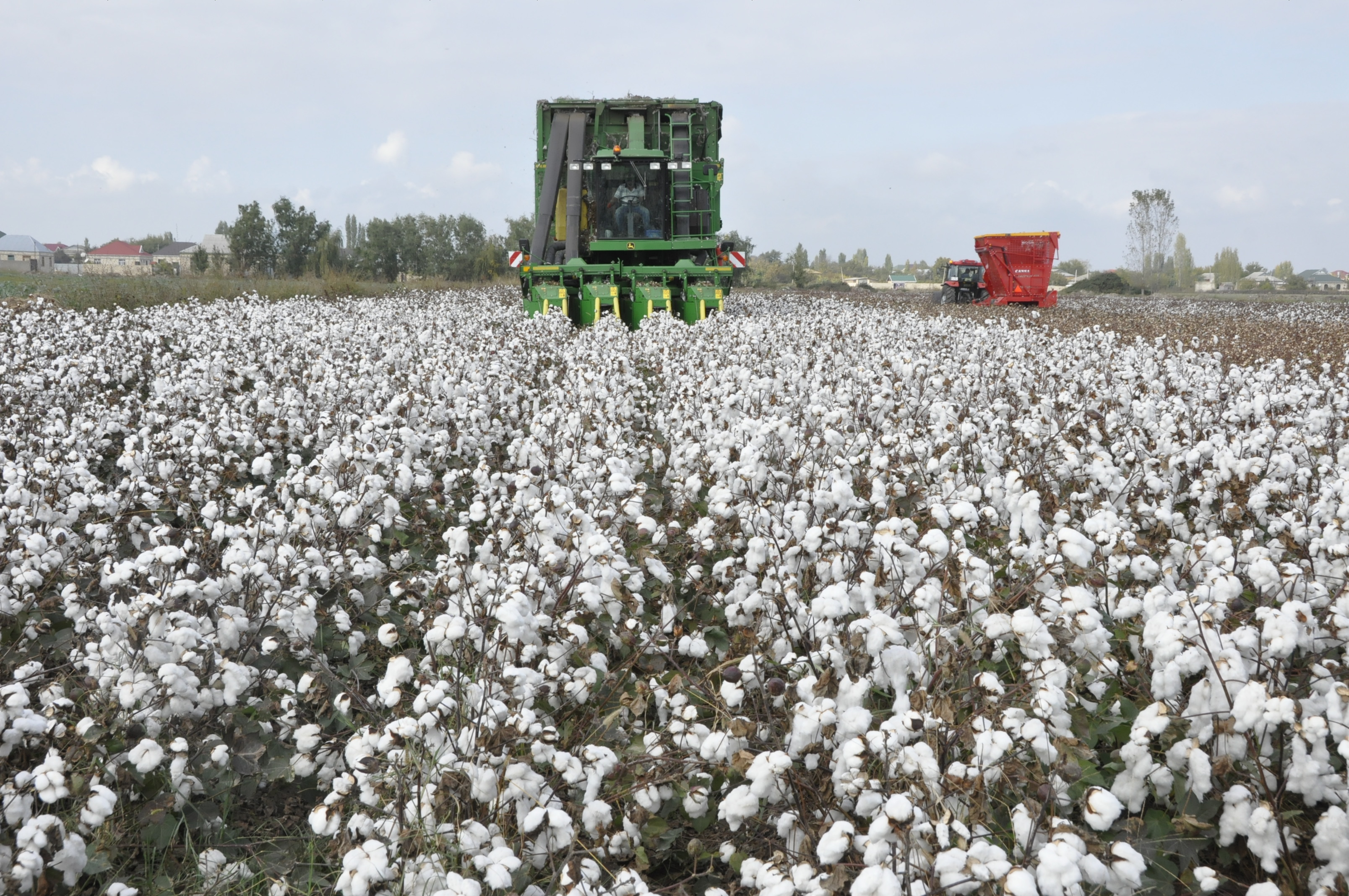
Cotton plantation located in the Barda District, Azerbaijan, 2018

The cotton industry is considered as one of the important industries in the country. Currently, the country intends to grow the cotton industry further and a number of steps have been taken in this direction. President Ilham Aliyev signed a decree on state support of cotton production in September 2016. The Ministry of Agriculture of Azerbaijan has developed the State Cotton Growing Program 2017–20. According to the program, it is planned to produce cotton on the 120,000-hectare area in 27 districts of the Republic.

== Scientific research ==
The Scientific Research Institute of Cotton-Growing is located in Ganja. Founded in 1925, it seeks out methods for cotton cultivation that produce high quality raw cotton and fiber. Soil-protection, energy and resource savings, and ecologically efficient technology are other areas of study. There are departments for agrochemistry, agrotechniques, irrigation and plant protection.

== See also ==
- Agriculture in Azerbaijan
