= Chinoz District =

Coordinates: 40.9407°N 68.7552°E

Chinoz
- District
- Chinoz tumani
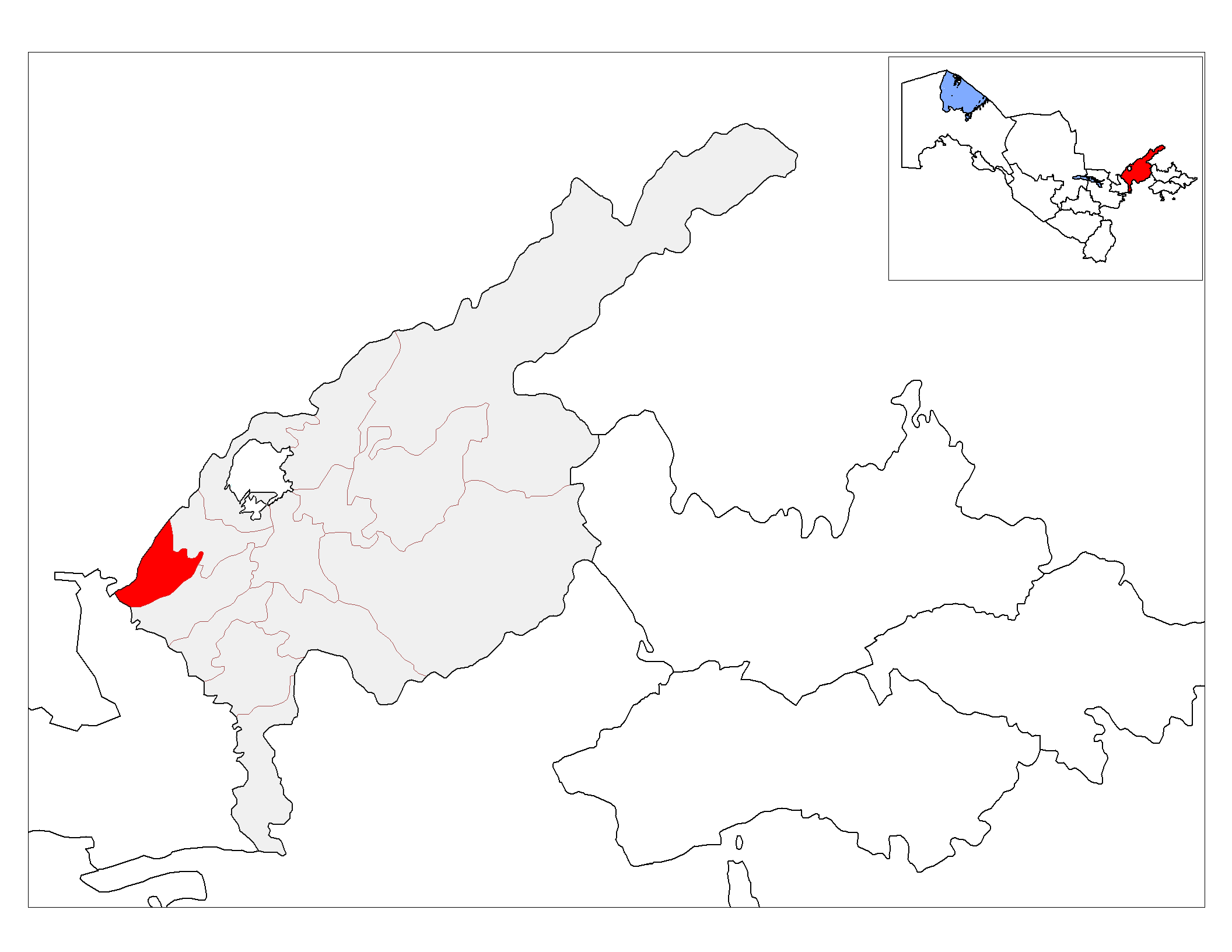
- Country: Uzbekistan
- Region: Tashkent Region
- Capital: Chinoz
- Established: 1935

Area
  - Total: 340 km^{2} (130 sq mi)

Population (2021)
  - Total: 136,100
  - Density: 400/km^{2} (1,000/sq mi)
- Time zone: UTC+5 (UZT)

Chinoz is a district of Tashkent Region in Uzbekistan. The capital lies at the city Chinoz. It has an area of 340 km^{2} (130 sq mi) and it had 136,100 inhabitants in 2021. The district consists of one city (Chinoz), 9 urban-type settlements (Olmazor, Yangi Chinoz, Gulzorobod, Doʻstlik, Paxta, A.Temur, Birlik, Chorvador, Kir) and 8 rural communities (Isloxat, Eshonobod, Turkiston, Oʻzbekiston, Chinoz, Eski Toshkent, Koʻtarma, Yollama).
