= Olmazor (town) =

- urban-type settlement
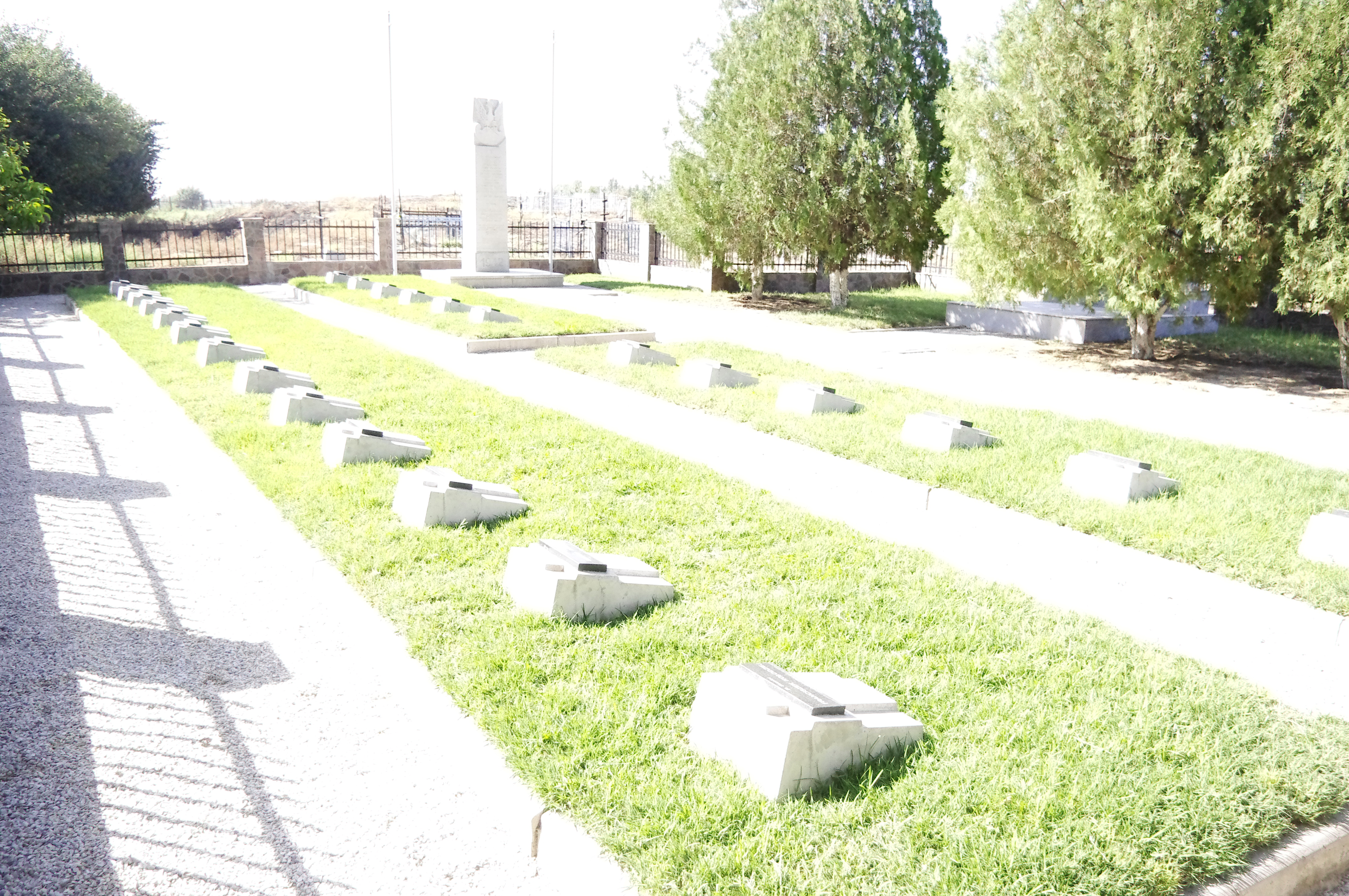
- Polish War Cemetery in Olmazor

- Location in Uzbekistan
- Coordinates: 40°57′52″N 68°40′48″E
- Country: Uzbekistan
- Region: Tashkent Region
- District: Chinoz District
- Urban-type settlement: 1937

Population (2016)
  - Total: 6,700
- Time zone: UTC+5 (UZT)

Olmazor (Uzbek: Olmazor, Russian: Алмазар, romanized: Almazar) is an urban-type settlement in Tashkent Region in eastern Uzbekistan. It is part of Chinoz District. Its population is 6,700 (2016).

== History ==
During World War II, in 1942, the training centre of the Polish Anders' Army was located in Olmazor. Polish soldiers trained there before fighting Nazi Germany. There is a Polish military cemetery in Olmazor.
