= Mil, Azerbaijan =

Orconikidze
- Location within Azerbaijan
- Coordinates: 39°37′56″N 47°41′12″E
- Country: Azerbaijan
- Rayon: Beylagan
- Time zone: UTC+4 (AZT)
  - Summer (DST): UTC+5 (AZT)

Mil (also, Orconikidze, Ordzhonikidze) is a village and municipality in the Beylagan Rayon of Azerbaijan. It has a population of 1,975.
