= Hero of Socialist Labour =

Highest Soviet state award

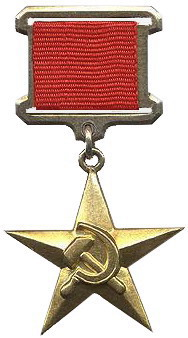
- "Sickle and Hammer" of the Hero of Socialist Labour medal
- Type: Highest degree of distinction
- Awarded for: Exceptional achievements in national economy and culture
- Presented by: Soviet Union
- Eligibility: Soviet citizens
- Status: Replaced by "Hero of Labour of the Russian Federation"
- Established: 27 December 1938; 87 years ago
- First award: 20 December 1939; 86 years ago
- Final award: December 24, 1991; 34 years ago

Highlights
- Total: 20,812: 105 people with two awards; 16 people with three awards
- Related: Hero of the Soviet Union; Hero of Labour of the Russian Federation

The Hero of Socialist Labour (Russian: Герой Социалистического Труда, romanized: Geroy Sotsialisticheskogo Truda) was an honorific title in the Soviet Union and other Warsaw Pact countries from 1938 to 1991. It represented the highest degree of distinction in the USSR and was awarded for exceptional achievements in Soviet industry and culture. It provided a similar status to the title of Hero of the Soviet Union, which was awarded for heroic deeds, but differed in that it was not awarded to foreign citizens.

== History ==
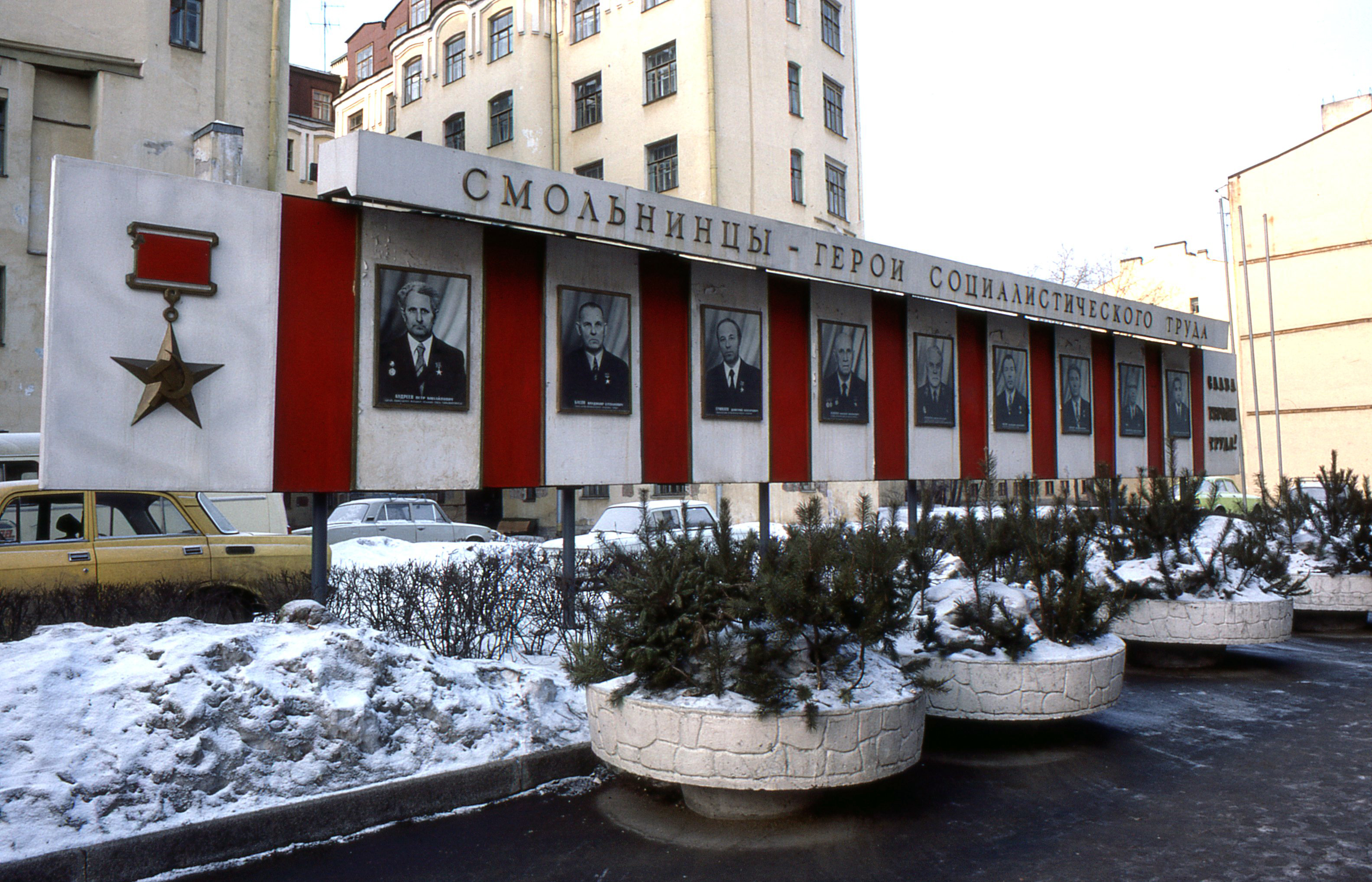
Street decoration with portraits of Heroes of Socialist Labour. Leningrad, 1984.

The Title "Hero of Socialist Labour" was introduced by decree of the Presidium of the Supreme Soviet of the Soviet Union on December 27, 1938.

Originally, Heroes of Socialist Labour were awarded the highest decoration of the Soviet Union, the Order of Lenin, and a diploma from the Presidium of the Supreme Soviet of the Soviet Union. In order to distinguish the Heroes of Socialist Labour from other Order of Lenin recipients, the "Hammer and Sickle" gold medal was introduced by decree of the Presidium on 22 May 1940, to accompany the Order of Lenin and diploma.

The first recipient of the award was Joseph Stalin, awarded by the Presidium of the Supreme Soviet on December 20, 1939. The second recipient was machine gun designer Vasily Degtyaryov (2 January 1940). The third (and the last before the onset of Operation Barbarossa) was issued to nine weapons designers, including Fedor Tokarev, Boris Shpitalniy, Nikolai Polikarpov, Alexander Yakovlev and Vladimir Klimov. Post-1945 recipients include Mikhail Koshkin, Mikhail Kalashnikov, Nikolai Afanasyev, Emilian Bucov, Alexander Tselikov, Dmitri Shostakovich, Peter Andreevich Tkachev, and Andrei Tupolev.

By September 1, 1971, 16,245 people (11,748 men, 4,497 women) had been awarded the title of Hero of Socialist Labour. One hundred and five people (80 men, 25 women) have been awarded multiple "Hammer and Sickle" medals. By 1991, at the dissolution of the Soviet Union, over 20,000 people had been awarded the title.

In the history of the USSR, 16 people became Heroes of Socialist Labour three times:

1. Anatoly Alexandrov
2. Boris Vannikov
3. Nikolai Dukhov
4. Yakov Zeldovich
5. Sergey Ilyushin
6. Mstislav Keldysh
7. Dinmukhamed Kunaev
8. Igor Kurchatov
9. Andrei Sakharov
10. Efim Slavsky
11. Andrei Tupolev
12. Hamroqul Tursunqulov
13. Yulii Khariton
14. Nikita Khrushchev
15. Konstantin Chernenko
16. Kirill Shchelkin
17. Alexander Prokhorov

In March 2013, Vladimir Putin issued a decree establishing a title considered to be its successor, "Hero of Labour of the Russian Federation".

== Statute ==
The Honorific title "Hero of Socialist Labour" was awarded by the Presidium to citizens who made significant contributions to the advancement of Soviet industry, agriculture, transportation, trade, science and technology, or otherwise served as exemplary models of the Soviet worker.

Heroes of Socialist Labour who attained further exceptional achievements were awarded a second "Hammer and Sickle" medal and bronze busts of the Heroes were to be constructed in their hometowns to mark the occasion. Thrice Heroes of Socialist Labour were to have their busts placed near the planned Palace of the Soviets, but this was never implemented as the Palace of Soviets was never built.

Only the Presidium of the Supreme Soviet of the Soviet Union could deprive a person of this title. The insignia "Hero of Socialist Labour", like the "Hero of the Soviet Union" Gold Star Medal, is always worn in full on the left side of the chest and in the presence of other orders and medals, placed above them. If worn with honorific titles of the Russian Federation, the latter have precedence.

== Award description ==
The title "Hero of Socialist Labour" was designed by the artist A. Pomansky. Its gold hammer and sickle insignia was a five-pointed star with smooth dihedral rays on the obverse, the diameter of the circumscribed star was 33.5 mm. In the centre of the obverse, a relief hammer and sickle respectively of 14 and 13 mm. It weighed 15.25 grams. The reverse was plain and was surrounded by a slightly raised rim. In the centre, the relief inscription "Hero of Socialist Labour" (Russian: "Герой Социалистического Труда") in 2mm high letters, the award serial number was inscribed just above in 1mm high numbers. The insignia was secured to a standard 25 × 15 mm Soviet square mount by a ring through the suspension loop. The mount was covered by a red silk moiré ribbon. On the reverse of the mount was a threaded stub and nut to secure the award to clothing.

== See also ==
- List of people awarded the Hero of Socialist Labour
- Hero of Socialist Labour (Albania)
- Hero of Socialist Labor (Bulgaria)
- Hero of Socialist Labor (Czechoslovakia)
- Hero of Labor of the Republic of Cuba
- Hero of Labour (East Germany)
- Hero of Socialist Labor (Hungary)
- Hero of Labour of Mongolia
- Hero of Labor (North Korea)
- Hero of Labor (Vietnam)
- Order of the Hero of Socialist Labour (Yugoslavia)
- Order of Industrial Heroism
