= Tashkent =

Capital and largest city of Uzbekistan

Tashkent Toshkent / Тошкент
- Capital city
- Tashkent
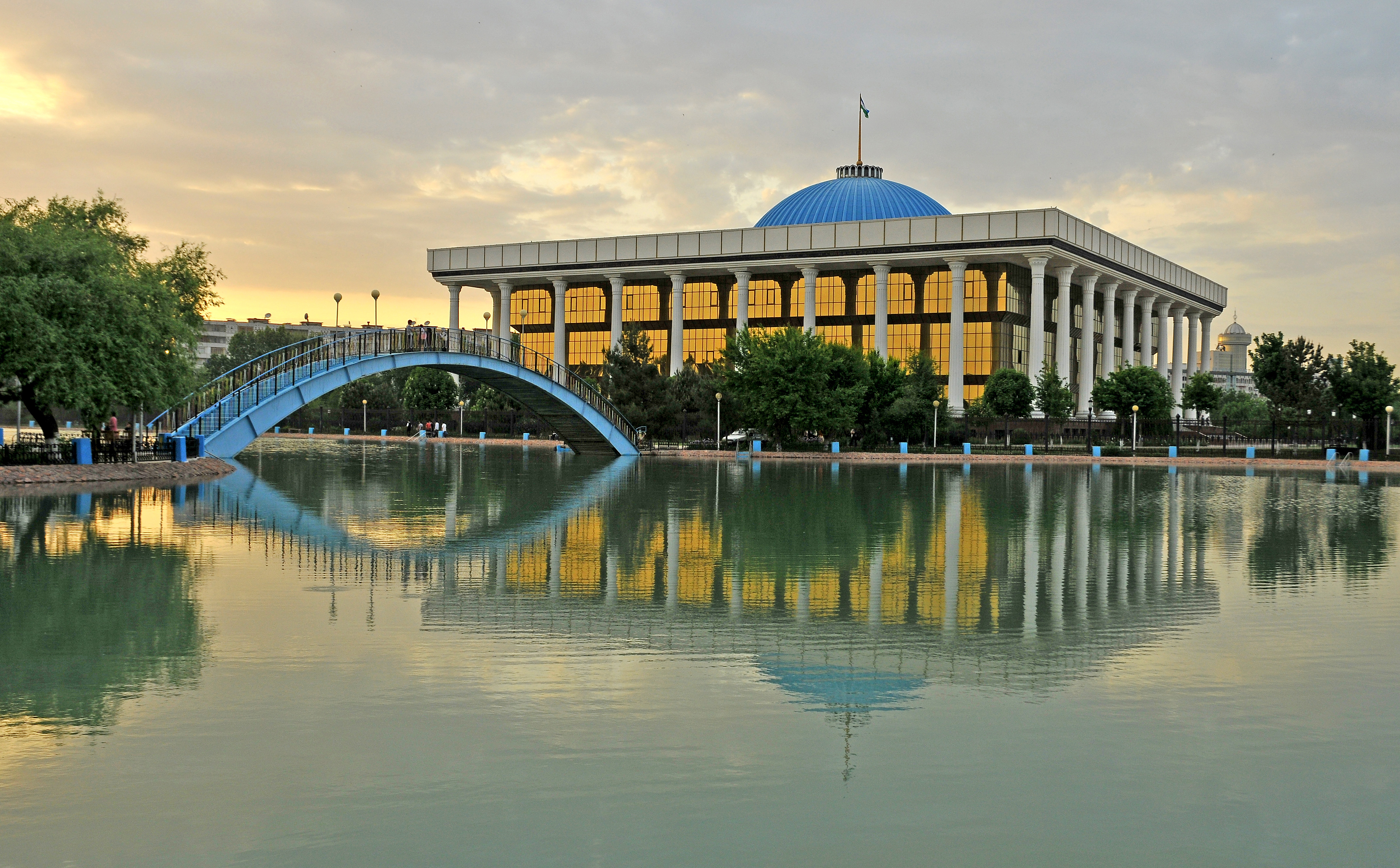
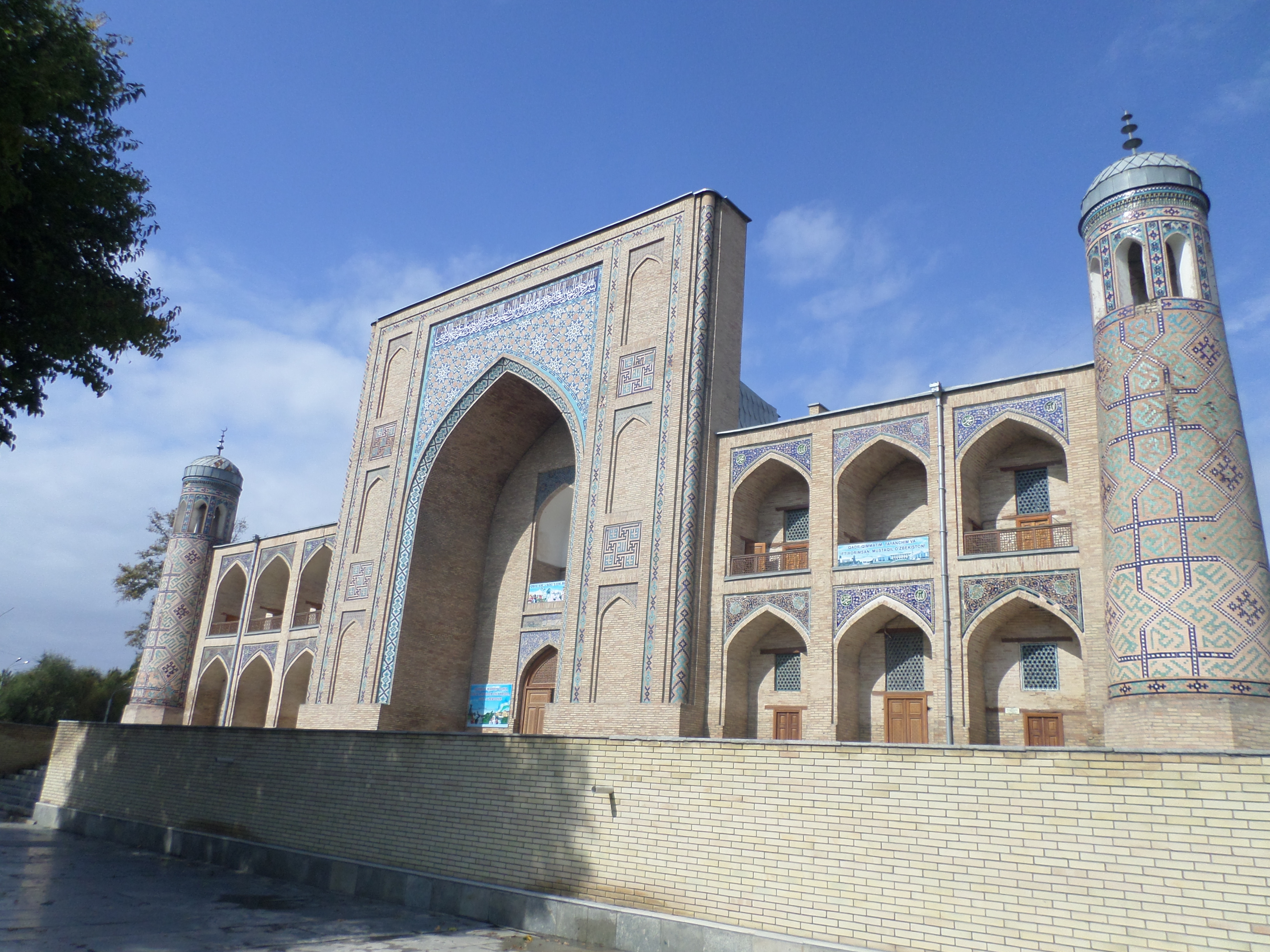
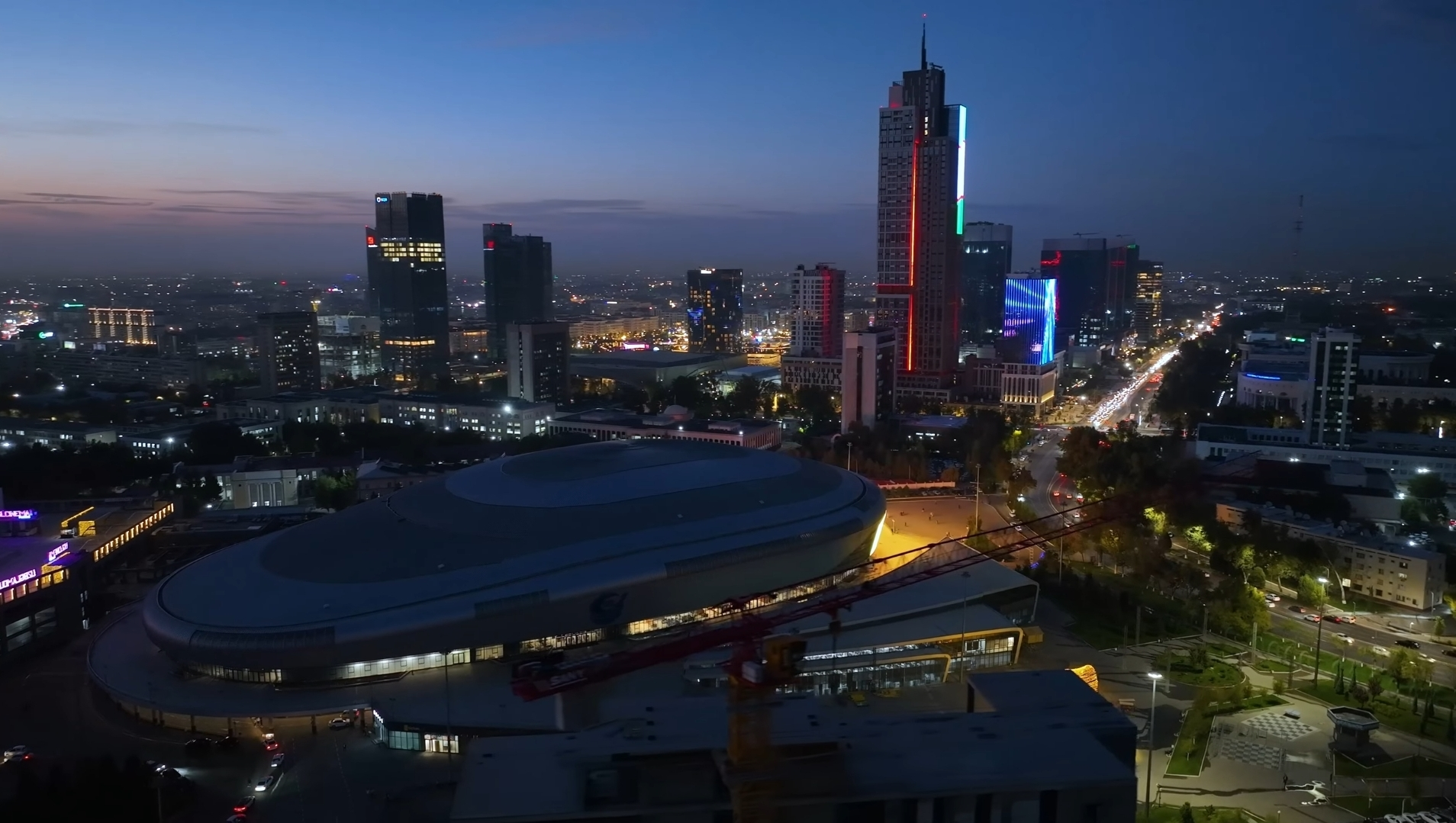
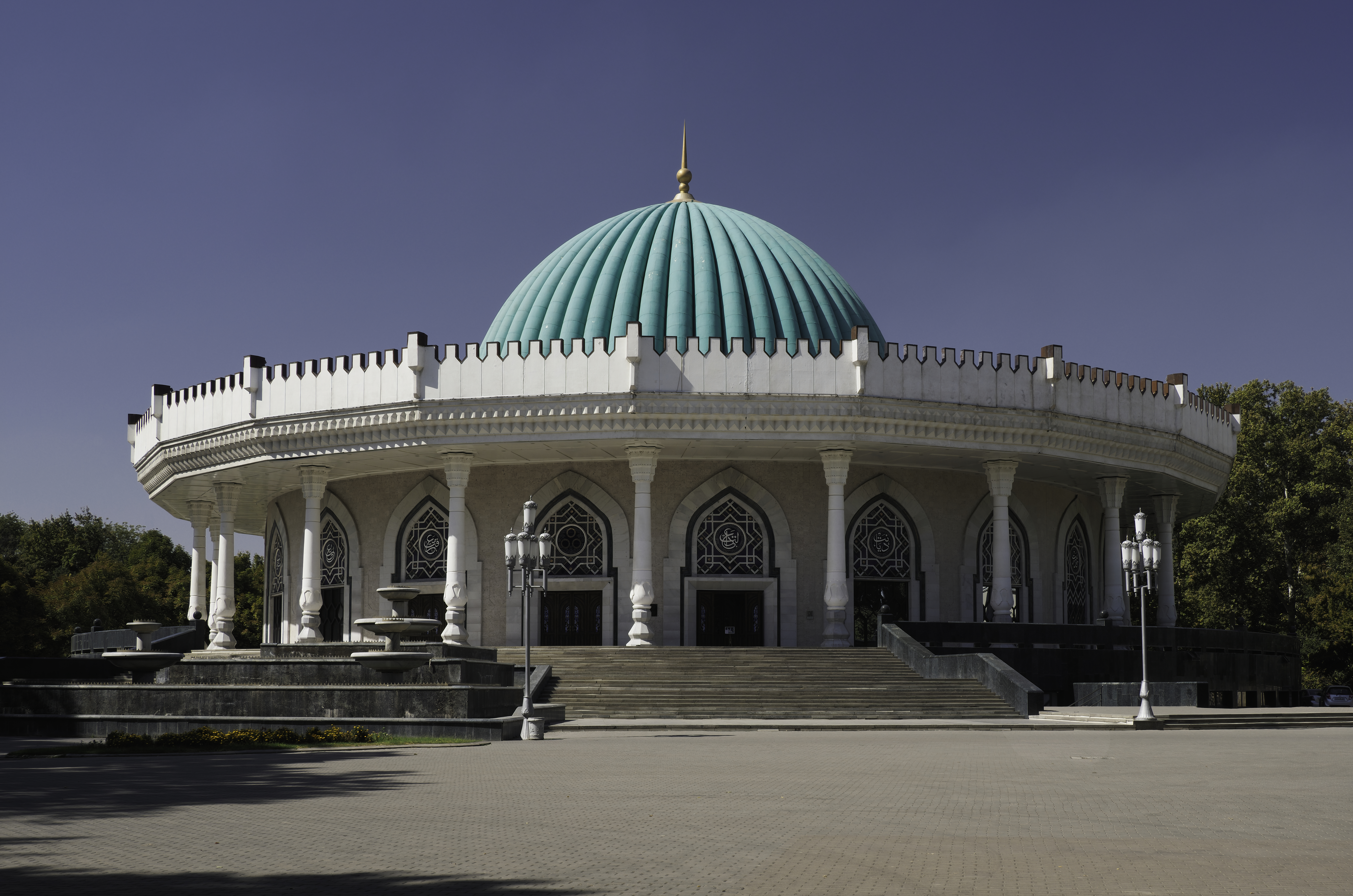
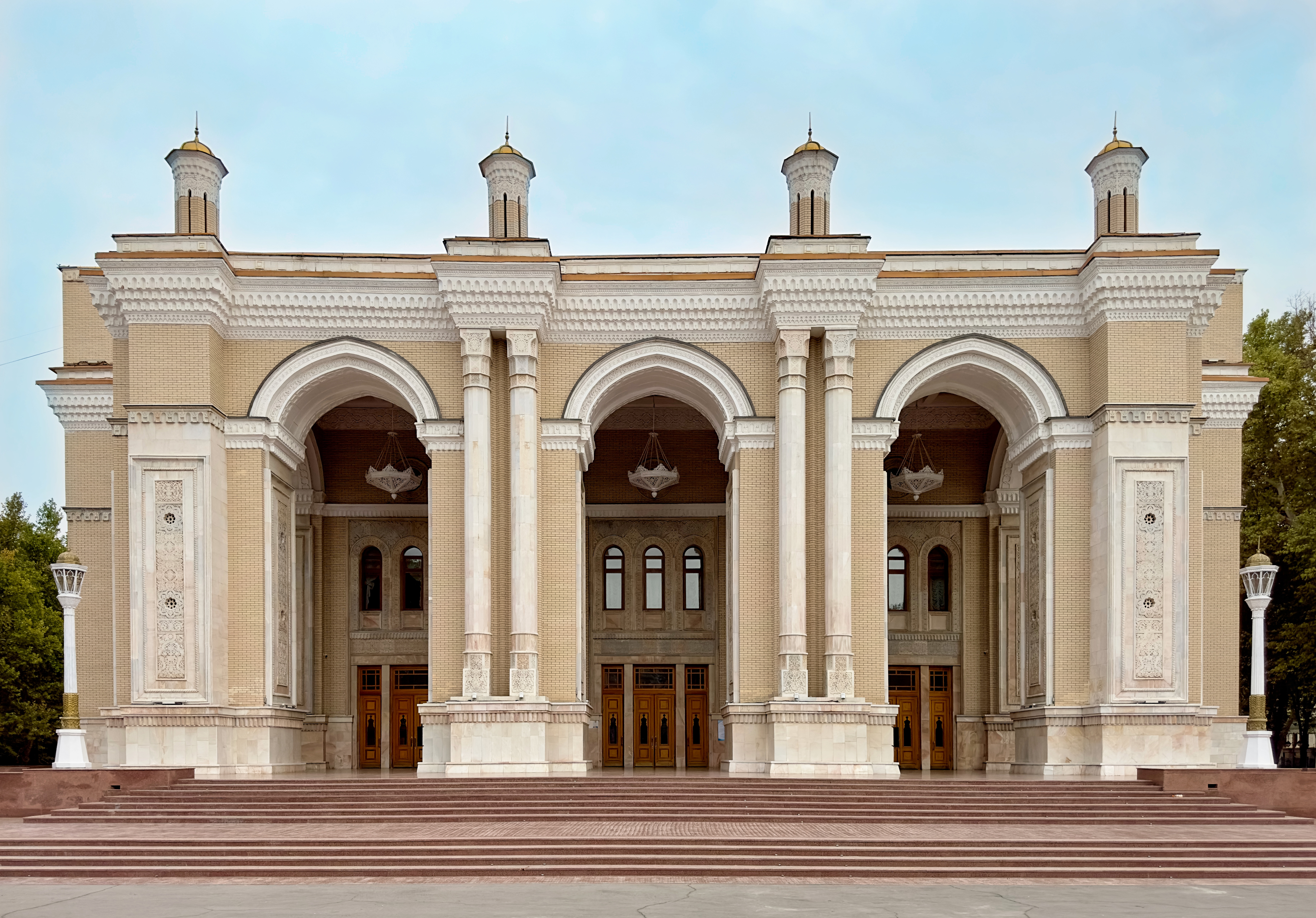
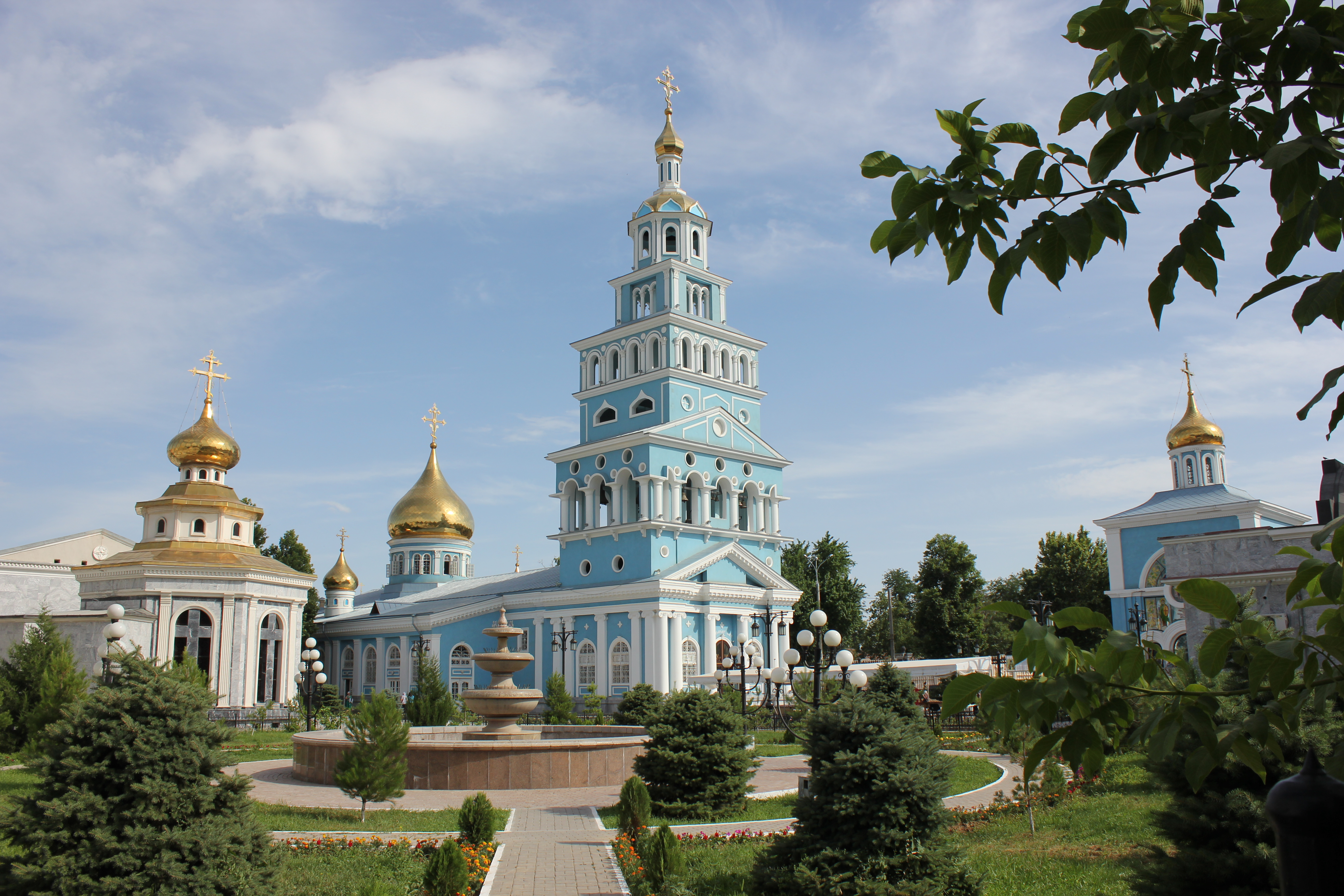
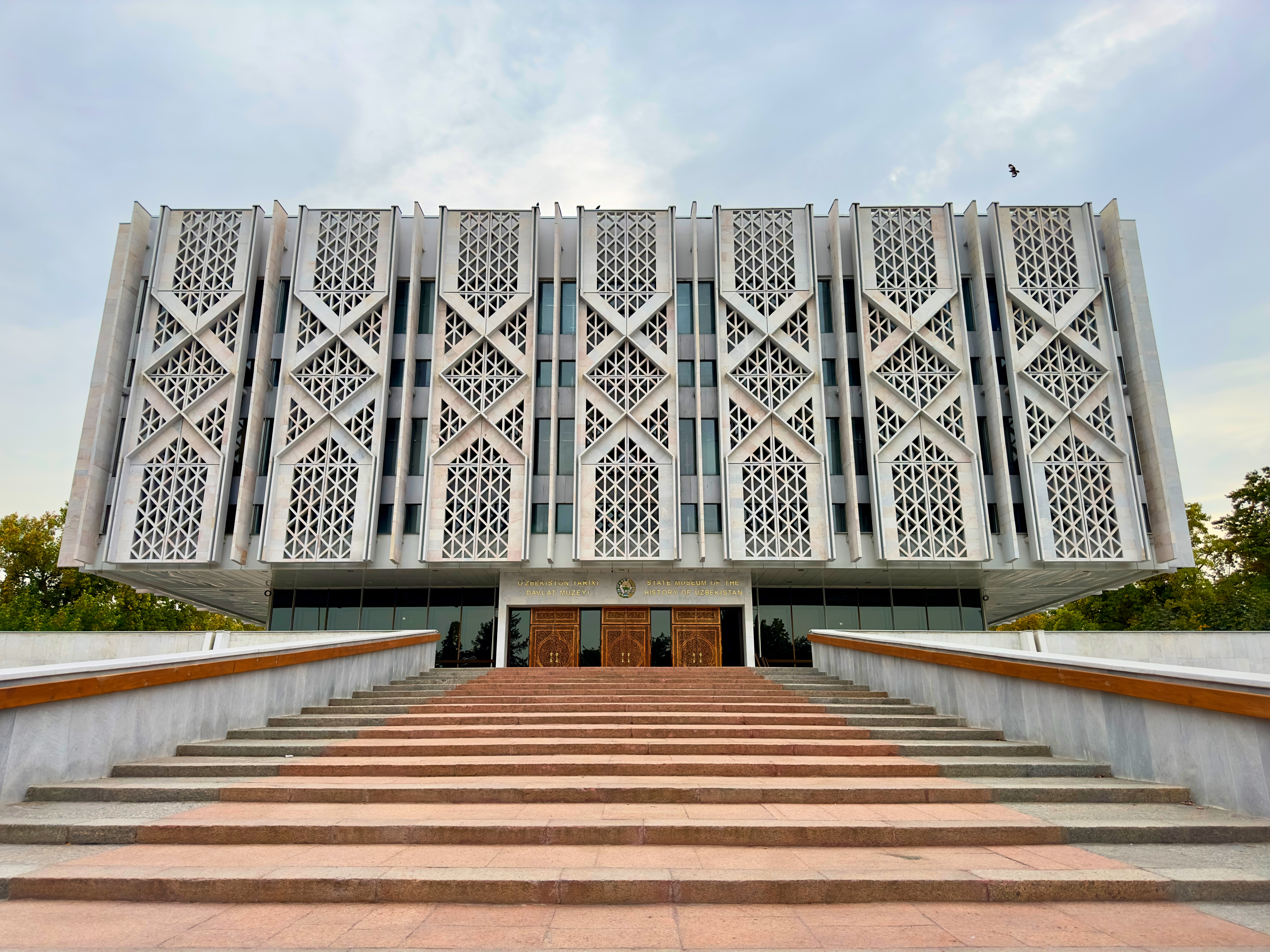
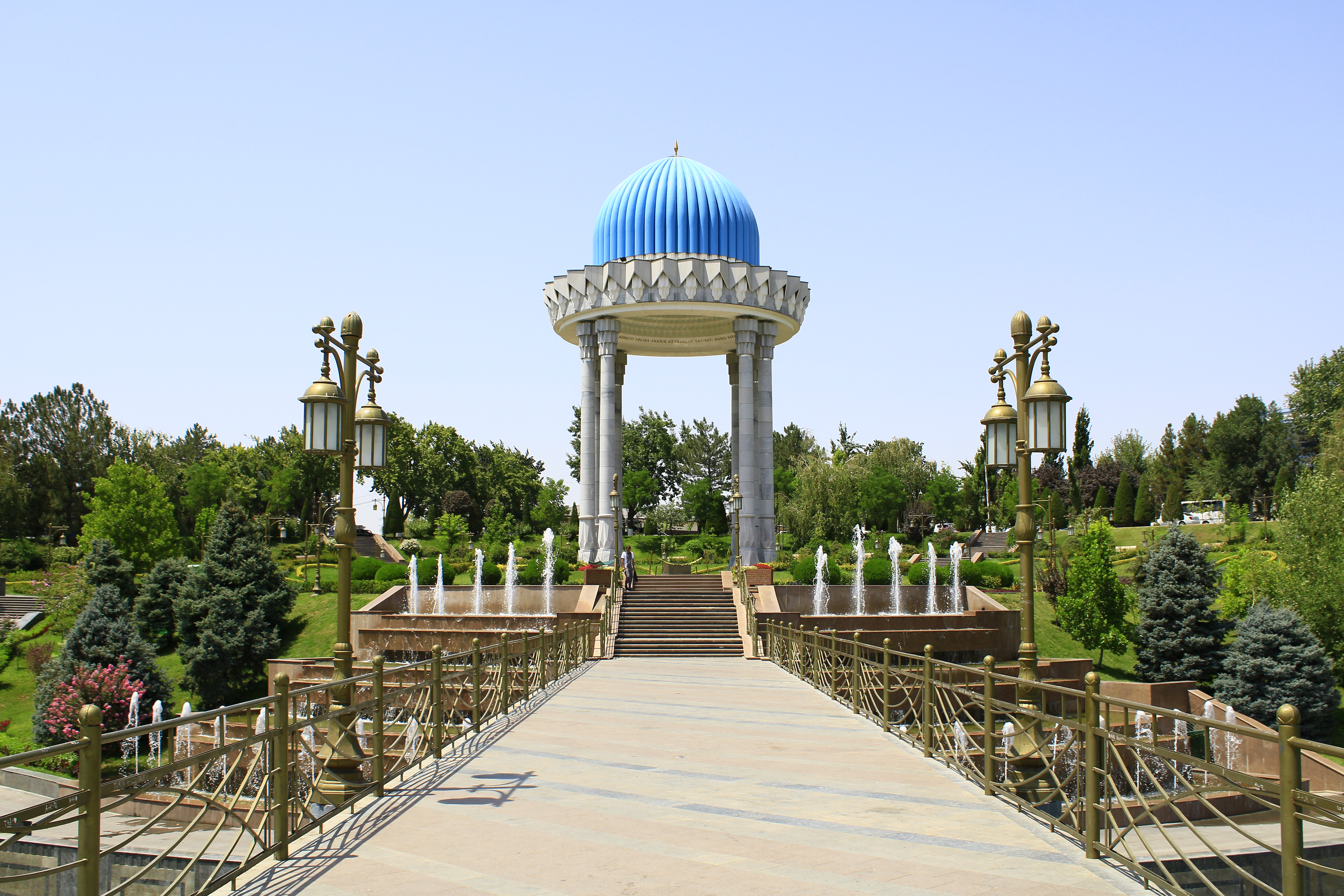
- Tashkent City Skyline with Nest One Oliy Majlis Kukeldash Madrasa Humo Ice Dome Amir Timur Museum Navoi Theater Assumption Cathedral State Museum of History Alisher Navoi National Park

- Flag Emblem
- Nickname: Tosh (lit. 'The rock')
- Motto: Kuch Adolatdadir ("Strength is in Justice")

- Location within Uzbekistan Location within Asia
- Coordinates: 41°18′40″N 69°16′47″E
- Country: Uzbekistan
- Settled: 3rd century BC
- Divisions: 12 districts

Government
  - Type: City Administration
  - Mayor: Shavkat Umurzakov

Area
  - Capital city: 631.29 km^{2} (243.74 sq mi)
  - Metro: 6,400 km^{2} (2,500 sq mi)

Dimensions
  - Length: 25 km (16 mi)
  - Width: 30 km (19 mi)
- Elevation: 455 m (1,493 ft)

Population (1 October 2025)
  - Capital city: 3,164,030
  - Rank: 1st in Central Asia; 1st in Uzbekistan
  - Density: 4,816/km^{2} (12,470/sq mi)
  - Urban: 2,575,431
  - Metro: 2,633,661
  - Metro density: 410/km^{2} (1,100/sq mi)
- Demonym: Toshkentlik (Uzbek)
- Time zone: UTC+05:00 (UZT)
- Postal code: 100000–100214
- Area code: 71
- Vehicle registration: 01
- International Airports: Islam Karimov Tashkent International Airport
- Rapid transit system: Tashkent Metro
- HDI (2023): 0.827 very high
- Website: tashkent.uz

UNESCO World Heritage Site
- Official name: Western Tien-Shan Mountain
- Criteria: Natural:
- Reference: 1490
- Inscription: 2016 (40th Session)
- Area: 528,177.6 ha (1,305,155 acres)

Tashkent (/tæʃˈkɛnt/), (Note: US also /tɑːʃˈkɛnt/) also spelled Toshkent, (Note: /tɒʃˈkɛnt/; Uzbek: Toshkent, Тошкент, تاشکند IPA: [tɒʃˈkent]) is the capital and largest city of Uzbekistan. (Note: The city was historically known as Chach, Shash, or Binkat) It is the most populous city in Central Asia, with a population of more than 3.1 million people as of July 1, 2025. It is located in northeastern Uzbekistan. Tashkent's history stretches back centuries as part of the ancient Silk Road, the network of trade routes that connected the Eastern world and the Western world. The city has long been a crossroads of cultures, goods and ideas.

Before the influence of Islam in the mid-8th century AD, Sogdian and Turkic culture was predominant. After Genghis Khan destroyed the city in 1219, it was rebuilt and profited from its location on the Silk Road. From the 18th to the 19th centuries, the city became an independent city-state, before being re-conquered by the Khanate of Kokand. In 1865, Tashkent fell to the Russian Empire; as a result, it became the capital of Russian Turkestan. In Soviet times, it witnessed major growth and demographic changes due to forced deportations from throughout the Soviet Union. Much of Tashkent was destroyed in the 1966 Tashkent earthquake, but it was soon rebuilt as a model Soviet city. It was the fourth-largest city in the Soviet Union at the time, after Moscow, Leningrad (now Saint Petersburg) and Kiev (now Kyiv).

Tashkent plays a central role in the country's economic and human development. In a 2023 report, the Center for Progressive Reforms ranked it first among Uzbekistan's regions, topping the list in five of the seven categories assessed – healthcare, education, economy, infrastructure and environment. Economically, Tashkent was the leading contributor to the national GDP, accounting for 19% of Uzbekistan's GDP in the first half of 2024. This economic dominance is supported by ongoing infrastructure development and urban modernisation projects aimed at enhancing its role as a financial and commercial hub. Nonetheless, the city faces challenges such as environmental concerns and the need for sustainable investment in public services.

Since Uzbekistan gained independence, Tashkent has retained its multi‑ethnic population, with ethnic Uzbeks forming the majority. In 2009, it celebrated 2,200 years of its written history.

The Government of Uzbekistan has approved a master plan for Tashkent that lasts through 2045, which focuses on balanced urban development, ecological protection and the preservation of cultural heritage.

== History ==
=== Etymology ===
During its long history, Tashkent has undergone various changes in names and political and religious affiliations. Abu Rayhan Biruni wrote that the city's name Tashkent comes from the Turkic tash and Persian kent, literally translated as "Stone City" or "City of Stones".

Ilya Gershevitch (1974:55, 72) (apud Livshits, 2007:179) traces the city's old name Chach back to Old Iranian *čāiča- "area of water, lake" (cf. Čaēčista, the Aral Sea's name in the Avesta) (whence Middle Chinese transcription *źiäk > standard Chinese Shí with Chinese character 石 for "stone"), and *Čačkand ~ Čačkanθ was the basis for Turkic adaptation Tashkent, popularly etymologized as "stone city". Livshits proposes that Čač originally designated only the Aral Sea before being used for the Tashkent oasis.

Ünal (2022) critiques Gershevitch's and Livshits's etymology as being "based on too many assumptions". He instead derives the name Čač from Late Proto-Turkic *t_{1}iāt_{2}(ă) "stone", which he proposes to be seemingly another translation, besides the apparent Chinese translation 石 shí "stone", of *kaŋk- (whence Chinese transcription 康居 EHC *kʰɑŋ-kɨɑ > standard Chinese Kāngjū), which possibly meant "stone". Against Harold Walter Bailey's and Edwin G. Pulleyblank's suggested Tocharian origin for *kaŋk-, Ünal proposes that it was instead an Iranian word and compares it to Pashto kā́ṇay "stone".

=== Early history ===
The first occupants identified in the Tashkent oasis were the Burgulik (Burghulik, Burgulyuk or Burganlik) culture, an ancient pastoral society of the Late Bronze and Early Iron Ages. The Burgulik era is usually divided into two periods, Burgulik I occurred during the 9th to 7th centuries BC and Burgulik II, from the 6th to 4th centuries BC. Archaeological excavations indicate that the Burgulik people were involved in animal husbandry, possibly agriculture with some irrigation and handicrafts. They lived primarily in basement shaped huts or hollowed cave dwellings and there was no evidence of wooden architecture. The hill fort, Shashtepa, in the southern part of the city was constructed during Burgulik I and is believed to have been abandoned in the 7th century BC.

Shashtepa was one of the largest villages of the Burgulik era as the availability of running water from the Dzhun Aryk, a branch of the Chirchik River and fertile soil made its location ideal for the sedentary life of agriculture. At the later stage (6th–3rd centuries BC), it was influenced by the late Saka culture of Southern Kazakhstan (Usun) and the culture of Northern Fergana (Aktam burial ground).

The Burgulik culture was replaced by the Kaunchin culture (Chach), which is usually associated with the population of the Kangju (K'ang-chü) state, a Chinese name for a kingdom in Central Asia that existed from about 140 BC to the 5th century AD. Chinese sources suggest that a settlement existed here at oasis near the Chirchik River in the 2nd century BC. Tashkent might have been or near "Beitian," (Pi-tien) the summer capital of Kangju.

Some scholars believe that a "Stone Tower" mentioned by Ptolemy in his famous treatise Geography, and by other early accounts of travel on the old Silk Road, referred to this settlement (due to its etymology). This tower is said to have marked the midway point between Europe and China. Other scholars, however, disagree with this identification, though it remains one of four most probable sites for the Stone Tower.

=== History as Chach ===
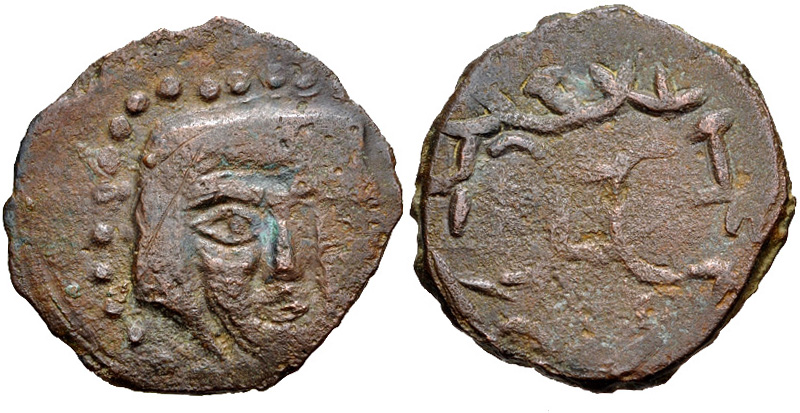
Coinage of Chach circa 625-725 CE

In pre-Islamic and early Islamic times, the town and the province were known as Chach. The Shahnameh of Ferdowsi also refers to the city as Chach.

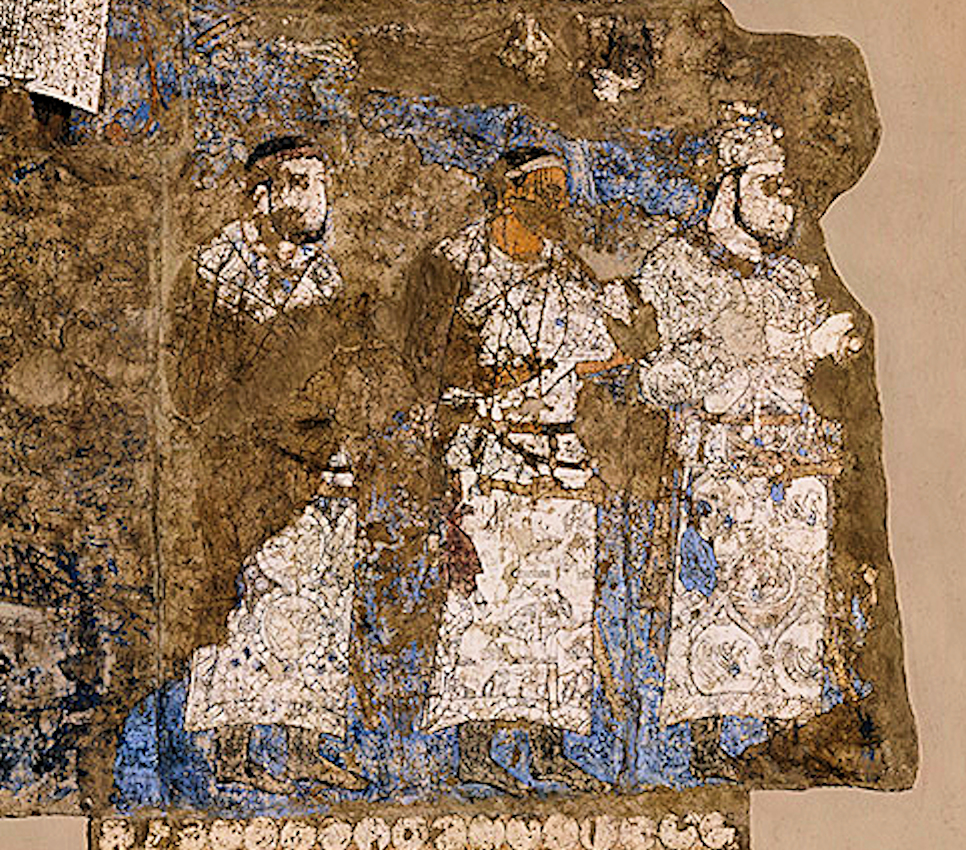
Ambassadors from Chaganian (central figure, inscription of the neck), and Chach (modern Tashkent) to king Varkhuman of Samarkand. 648-651 CE, Afrasiyab murals, Samarkand.

The principality of Chach had a square citadel built around the 5th to 3rd centuries BC, some 8 km (5.0 mi) south of the Syr Darya River. By the 7th century AD, Chach had more than 30 towns and a network of over 50 canals, forming a trade center between the Sogdians and Turkic nomads. The Buddhist monk Xuanzang (602/603? – 664 AD), who travelled from China to India through Central Asia, mentioned the name of the city as Zhěshí (赭時). The Chinese chronicles History of Northern Dynasties, Book of Sui, and Old Book of Tang mention a possession called Shí 石 ("stone") or Zhěshí 赭時 with a capital of the same name since the fifth century AD.

In 558–603, Chach was part of the Turkic Khaganate. At the beginning of the 7th century, the Turkic Khaganate, as a result of internecine wars and wars with its neighbors, disintegrated into the Western and Eastern Khaganates. The Western Turkic ruler Tong Yabghu Qaghan (618–630) set up his headquarters in the Ming-bulak area to the north of Chach. Here he received embassies from the emperors of the Tang Empire and Byzantium. In 626, the Indian Buddhist preacher Prabhakāramitra arrived with ten companions to the Khagan. In 628, Xuanzang arrived in Ming-bulak.

The Turkic rulers of Chach minted their coins with the inscription on the obverse side of the "lord of the Khakan money" (mid-8th century); with an inscription in the ruler Turk (7th century), in Nudjket in the middle of the 8th century, coins were issued with the obverse inscription "Nanchu (Banchu) Ertegin sovereign".

=== Islamic Caliphate ===
Chach (Arabic: Shash) was conquered by the Umayyad Caliphate at the beginning of the 8th century.

According to the descriptions of the authors of the 10th century, Shash was structurally divided into a citadel, an inner city (madina) and two suburbs - an inner (rabad-dahil) and an outer (rabad-harij). The citadel, surrounded by a special wall with two gates, contained the ruler's palace and the prison.

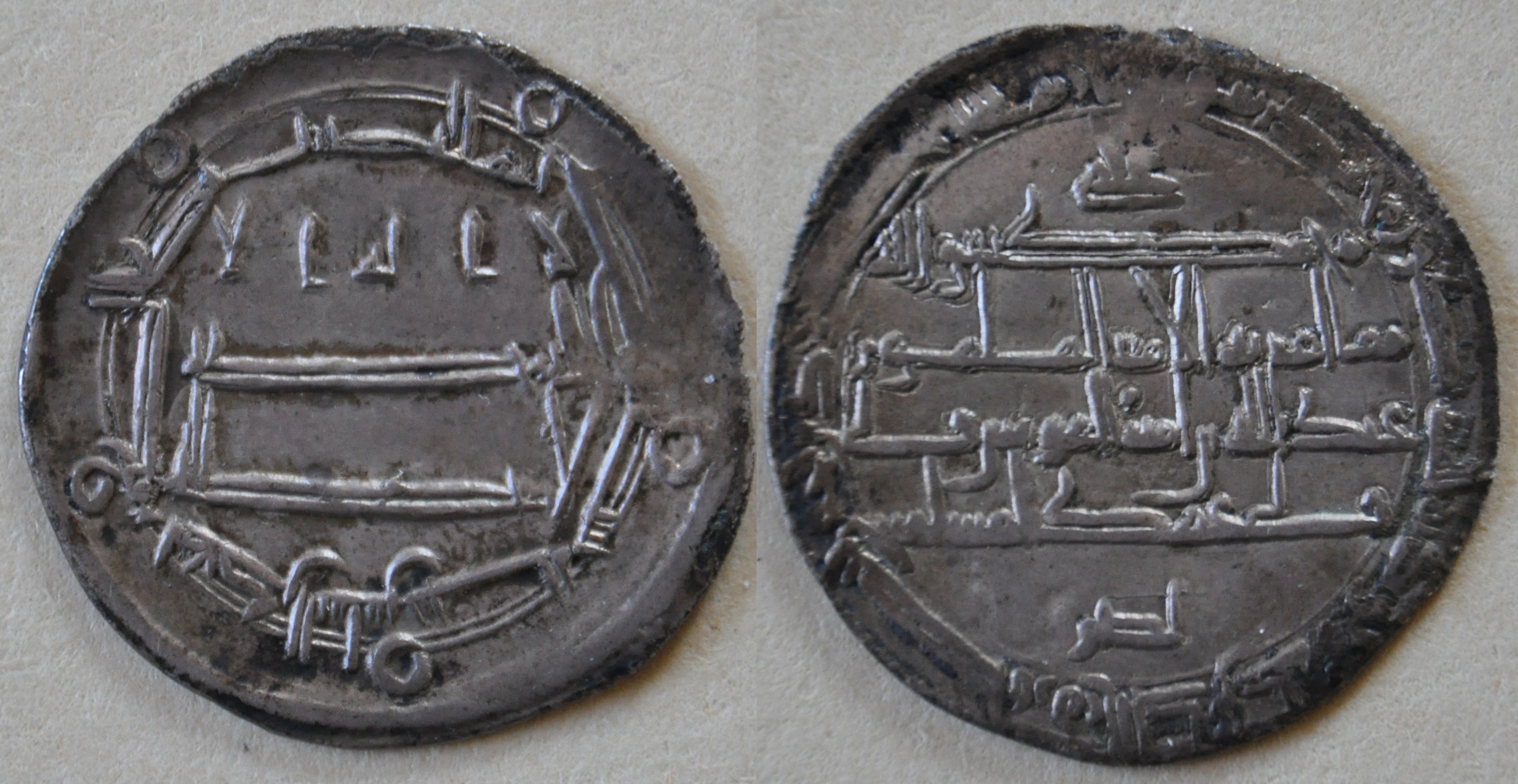
Silver Dirham of Abbasid caliph Harun al-Rashid minted in Tashkent (Mad'an al-Shash) in 190 AH (805/806 CE)

=== Post-Caliphate rule ===
Under the Samanid Empire, whose founder Ismail Samani was a descendant of Persian Zoroastrian convert to Islam, the city came to be known as Binkath. However, the Arabs retained the old name of Chach for the surrounding region, pronouncing it ash-Shāsh (الشاش) instead. Abu Bakr Muhammad ibn Ali ash-Shashi, known as al-Kaffal ash-Shashi (904–975), was born in Tashkent. He was an Islamic theologian, scholar, jurist of the Shafi'i madhhab, hadith scholar and linguist.

After the 11th century, the name evolved from Chachkand/Chashkand to Tashkand. The modern spelling of "Tashkent" reflects Russian orthography and 20th-century Soviet influence.

At the end of the 10th century, Tashkent became part of the possessions of the Turkic state of the Karakhanids. In 998/99 the Tashkent oasis went to the Karakhanid Ahmad ibn Ali, who ruled the north-eastern regions of Mavarannahr. In 1177/78, a separate khanate was formed in the Tashkent oasis. Its center was Banakat, where dirhams of Mu'izz ad-dunya wa-d-din Qilich-khan were minted, in 1195–1197; and of Jalal ad-dunya wa-d-din Tafgach-khakan, in 1197–1206.

=== Mongol conquest ===
The city was destroyed by Genghis Khan in 1219 and lost much of its population as a result of the Mongols' destruction of the Khwarezmid Empire in 1220.

=== Timurid period ===
Under the Timurid and subsequent Shaybanid dynasties, the city's population and culture gradually revived as a prominent strategic center of scholarship, commerce and trade along the Silk Road. During the reign of Amir Timur (1336–1405), Tashkent was restored and in the 14th-15th centuries Tashkent was part of Timur's empire. For Timur, Tashkent was considered a strategic city. In 1391 Timur set out in the spring from Tashkent to Desht-i-Kipchak to fight the Khan of the Golden Horde Tokhtamysh Khan. Timur returned from this victorious campaign through Tashkent.

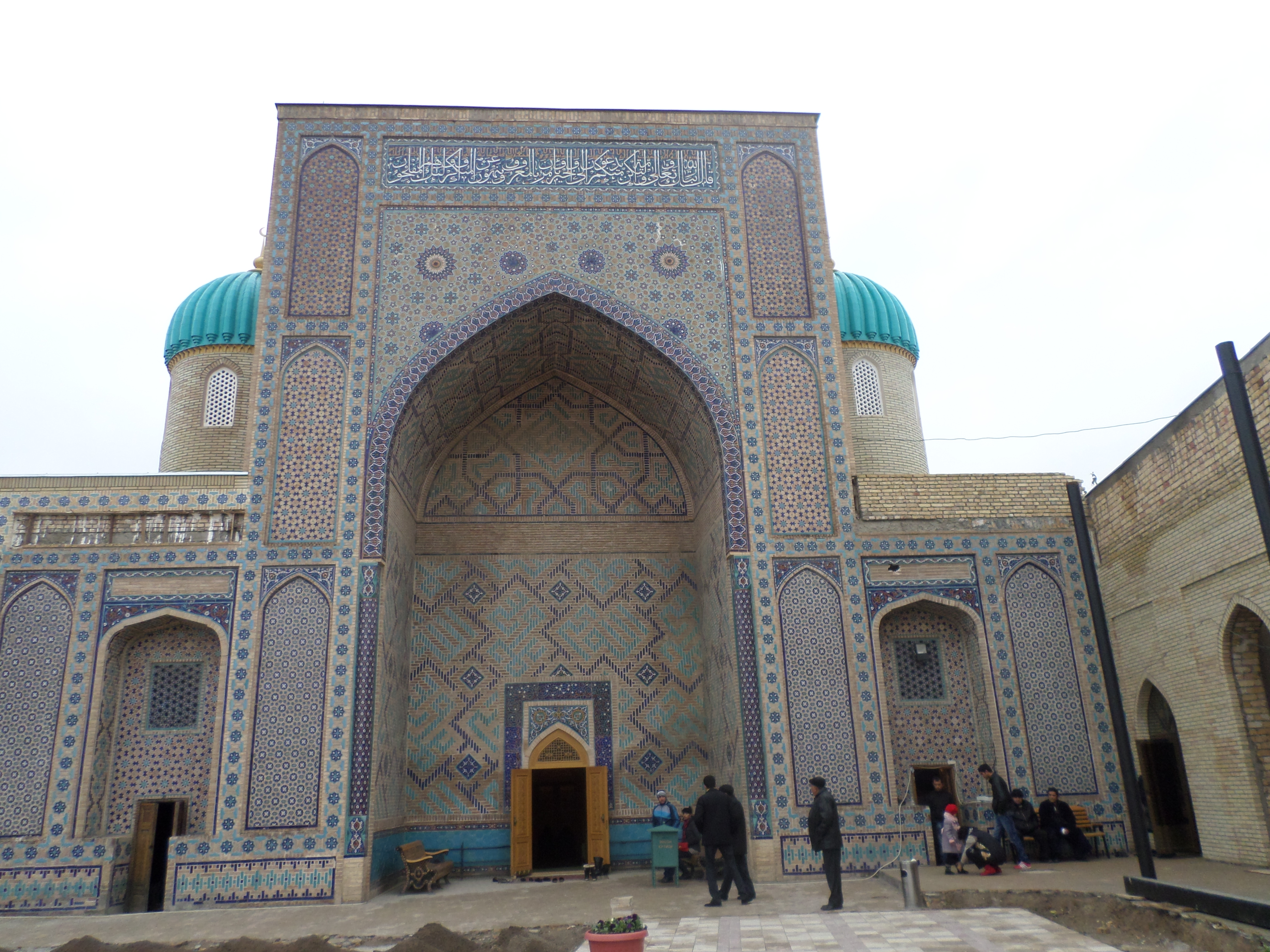
Zangi ata shrine

The most famous saint Sufi of Tashkent was Sheikh Khovendi at-Takhur (13th to the first half of the 14th century). According to legend, Amir Timur, who was treating his wounded leg in Tashkent with the healing water of the Zem-Zem spring, ordered to build a mausoleum for the saint. By order of Timur, the Zangiata mausoleum was built.

=== Uzbek Shaybanid's dynasty period ===
In the 16th century, Tashkent was ruled by the Shaybanid dynasty.

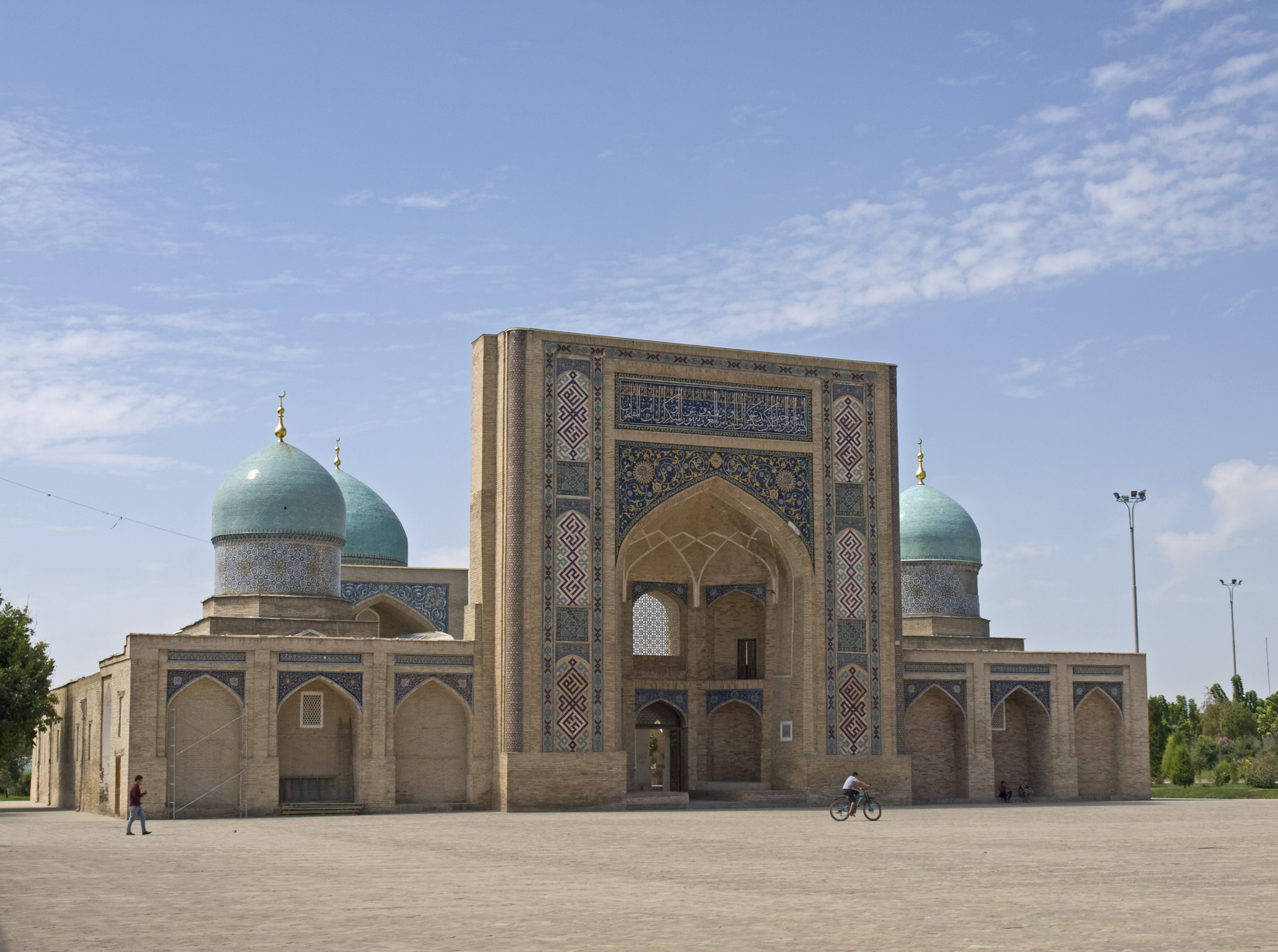
Barak khan madrasa, Shaybanids, 16th century

Shaybanid Suyunchkhoja Khan was an enlightened Uzbek ruler; following the traditions of his ancestors Mirzo Ulugbek and Abul Khair Khan, he gathered famous scientists, writers and poets at his court, among them: Vasifi, Abdullah Nasrullahi, Masud bin Osmani Kuhistani. Since 1518 Vasifi was the educator of the son of Suyunchhoja Khan Keldi Muhammad, with whom, after the death of his father in 1525, he moved to Tashkent. After the death of his former pupil, he became the educator of his son, Abu-l-Muzaffar Hasan-Sultan.

Later the city was subordinated to Shaybanid Abdullah Khan II (the ruler actually from 1557, officially in 1583–1598), who issued his coins here. From 1598 to 1604 Tashkent was ruled by the Shaybanid Keldi Muhammad, who issued silver and copper coins on his behalf.

=== Kazakh ruled period ===
In 1598, Kazakh Tauekel Khan was at war with the Khanate of Bukhara. The Bukhara troops sent against him were defeated by Kazakhs in the battle between Tashkent and Samarkand. During the reign of Yesim-Khan, a peace treaty was concluded between Bukhara and Kazakhs, according to which Kazakhs abandoned Samarkand, but left behind Tashkent, Turkestan and a number of Syr Darya cities.

Yesim-Khan ruled the Kazakh Khanate from 1598 to 1628, his main merit was that he managed to unite the Kazakh khanate. The city was part of Kazakh Khanate between 1598 and 1723.

=== Tashkent state ===
In 1784, Yunus Khoja, the ruler of the dakha (district) Shayhantahur, united the entire city under his rule and created an independent Tashkent state (1784–1807), which by the beginning of the 19th century seized vast lands.

=== Kokand Khanate ===
In 1809, Tashkent was annexed to the Khanate of Kokand. At the time, Tashkent had a population of around 100,000 and was considered the richest city in Central Asia.

Under the Kokand domination, Tashkent was surrounded by a moat and an adobe battlement (about 20 kilometers long) with 12 gates. It prospered greatly through trade with Russia but chafed under Kokand's high taxes. The Tashkent clergy also favored the clergy of Bukhara over that of Kokand. However, before the Emir of Bukhara could capitalize on this discontent, the Russian army arrived.

=== Colonial period ===
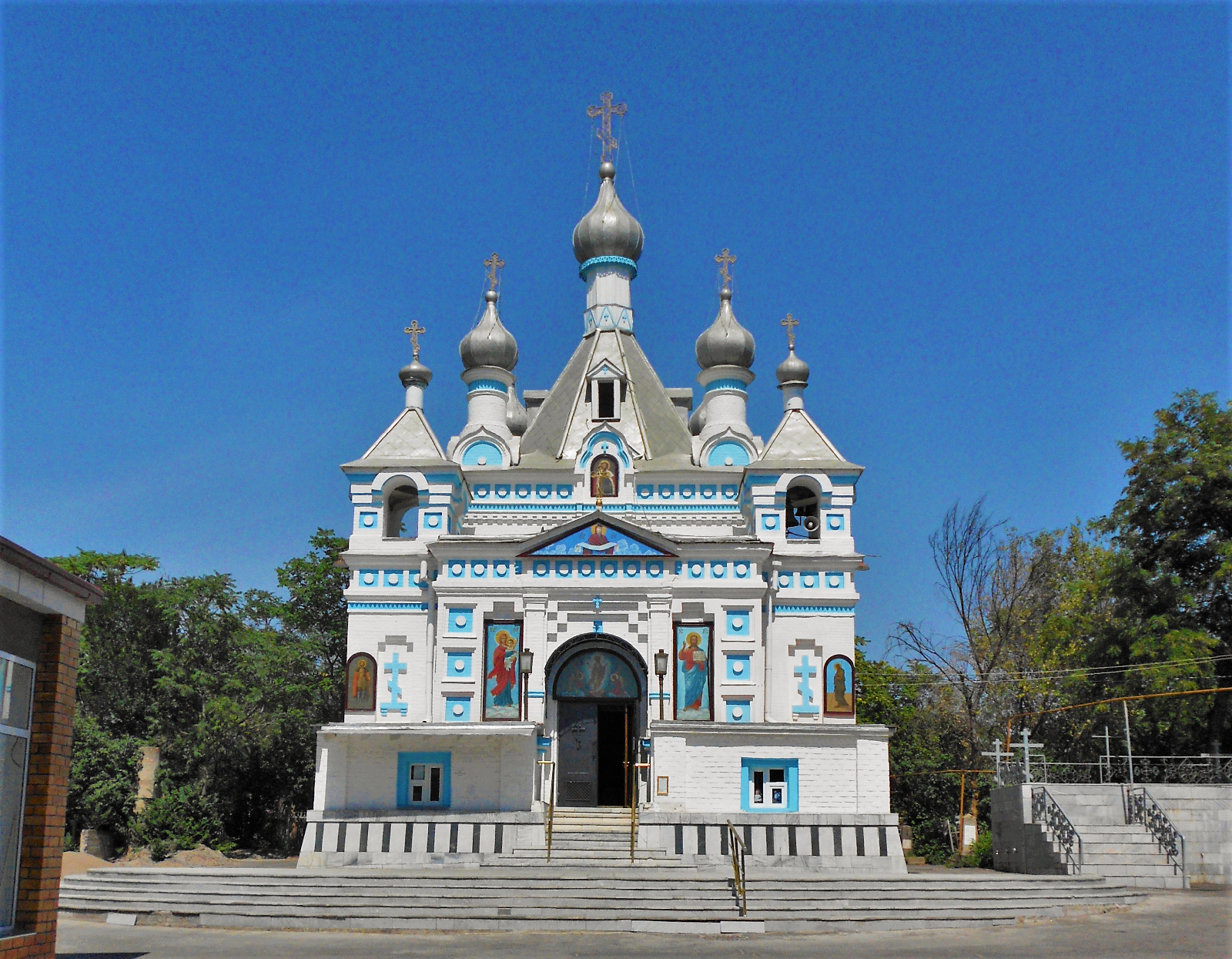
Alexander Nevsky Cathedral was built by the Russian Orthodox Church in Tashkent.

In May 1865, Mikhail Grigorevich Chernyayev (Cherniaev), acting against the direct orders of the Tsar and outnumbered at least 15–1, staged a daring night attack against a city with a wall 25 km (16 mi) long with 11 gates and 30,000 defenders. While a small contingent staged a diversionary attack, the main force penetrated the walls, led by a Russian Orthodox priest. Although the defense was stiff, the Russians captured the city after two days of heavy fighting and the loss of only 25 dead as opposed to several thousand of the defenders (including Alimqul, the ruler of the Kokand Khanate). Chernyayev, dubbed the "Lion of Tashkent" by city elders, staged a hearts-and-minds campaign to win the population over. He abolished taxes for a year, rode unarmed through the streets and bazaars meeting common people, and appointed himself "Military Governor of Tashkent", recommending to Tsar Alexander II that the city become an independent khanate under Russian protection.

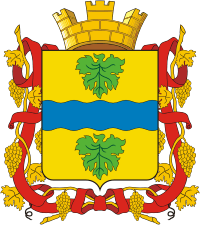
Coats of arms of Tashkent, 1909

The Tsar liberally rewarded Chernyayev and his men with medals and bonuses, but regarded the impulsive general as a loose cannon, and soon replaced him with General Konstantin Petrovich von Kaufman. Far from being granted independence, Tashkent became the capital of the new territory of Russian Turkistan, with Kaufman as first Governor-General. A cantonment and Russian settlement were built across the Ankhor Canal from the old city, and Russian settlers and merchants poured in. Tashkent was a center of espionage in the Great Game rivalry between Russia and the United Kingdom over Central Asia. The Turkestan Military District was established as part of the military reforms of 1874. The Trans-Caspian Railway arrived in 1889, and the railway workers who built it settled in Tashkent as well, bringing with them the seeds of Bolshevik Revolution.

During World War I, from October 1914 to March 1915, a group of Polish civilians from Warsaw was imprisoned by the Russians in Tashkent.

=== Effect of the Russian Revolution ===
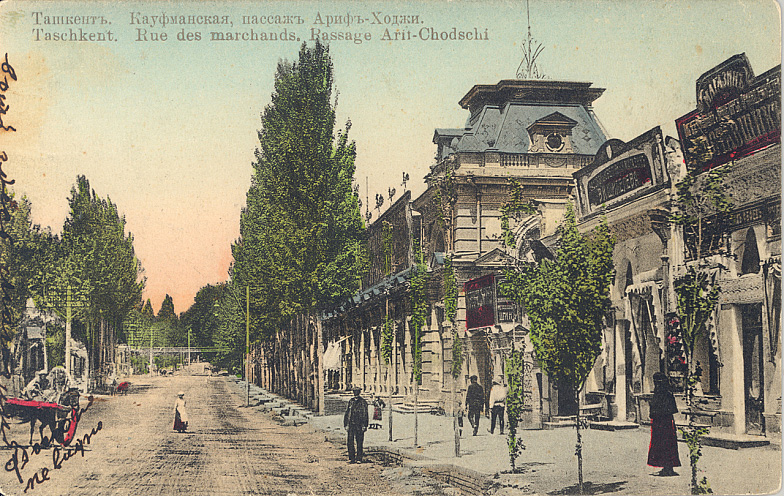
Tashkent c. 1910

With the fall of the Russian Empire, the Russian Provisional Government removed all civil restrictions based on religion and nationality, contributing to local enthusiasm for the February Revolution. The Tashkent Soviet of Soldiers' and Workers' Deputies was soon set up, but primarily represented Russian residents, who made up about a fifth of the Tashkent population. Muslim leaders quickly set up the Tashkent Muslim Council (Tashkand Shura-yi-Islamiya) based in the old city. On 10 March 1917, there was a parade with Russian workers marching with red flags, Russian soldiers singing La Marseillaise and thousands of local Central Asians. Following various speeches, Governor-General Aleksey Kuropatkin closed the events with words "Long Live a great free Russia".

The First Turkestan Muslim Conference was held in Tashkent 16–20 April 1917. Like the Muslim Council, it was dominated by the Jadid, Muslim reformers. A more conservative faction emerged in Tashkent centered around the Ulema. This faction proved more successful during the local elections of July 1917. They formed an alliance with Russian conservatives, while the Soviet became more radical. The Soviet attempt to seize power in September 1917 proved unsuccessful.

In April 1918, Tashkent became the capital of the Turkestan Autonomous Soviet Socialist Republic (Turkestan ASSR). The new regime was threatened by White forces, basmachi; revolts from within, and purges ordered from Moscow.

=== Soviet period ===
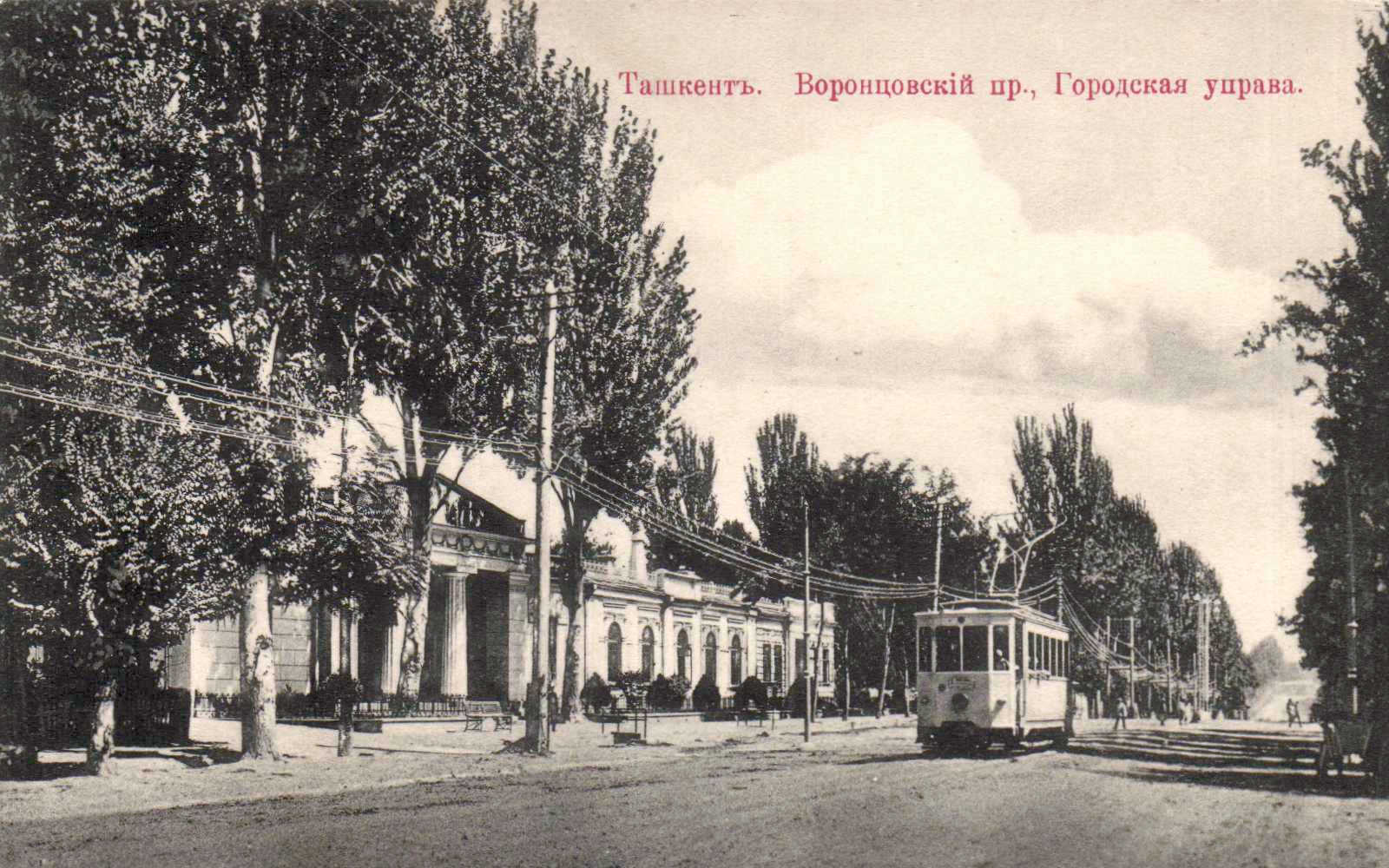
Tashkent, 1917

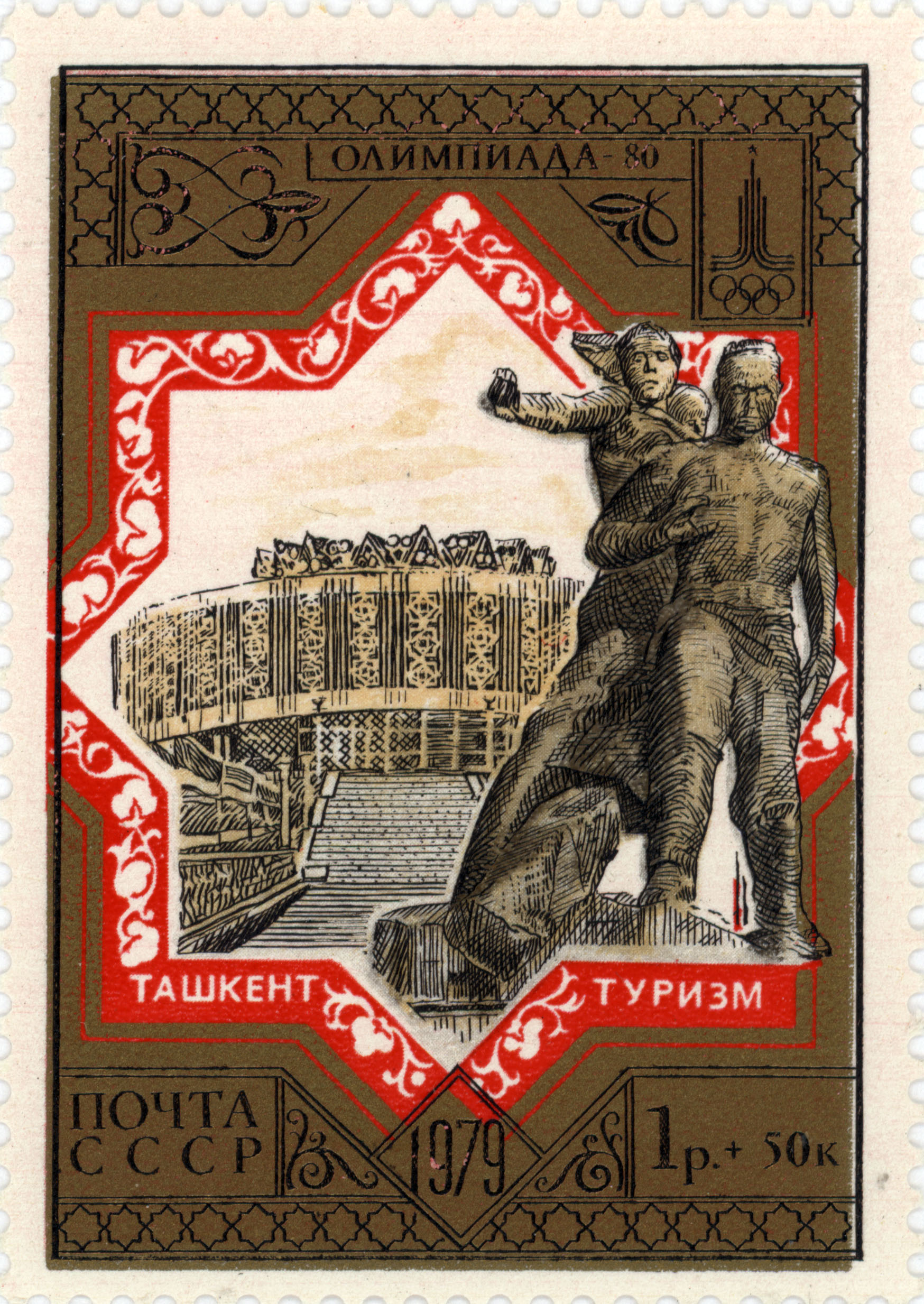
The Courage Monument (Jasorat) in Tashkent on a 1979 Soviet stamp. In the background: the Friendship of the Peoples Museum building (since 1996—Museum of Olympic Glory)

The city began to industrialize in the 1920s and 1930s.

Violating the Molotov–Ribbentrop Pact, Nazi Germany invaded the Soviet Union in June 1941. The government worked to relocate factories from western Russia and Ukraine to Tashkent to preserve the Soviet industrial capacity. This led to great increase in industry during World War II.

It also evacuated most of the German communist emigres to Tashkent. The Russian population increased dramatically; evacuees from the war zones increased the total population of Tashkent to well over a million. Russians and Ukrainians eventually made up more than half of the total residents of Tashkent. Many of the former refugees stayed in Tashkent to live after the war, rather than return to former homes.

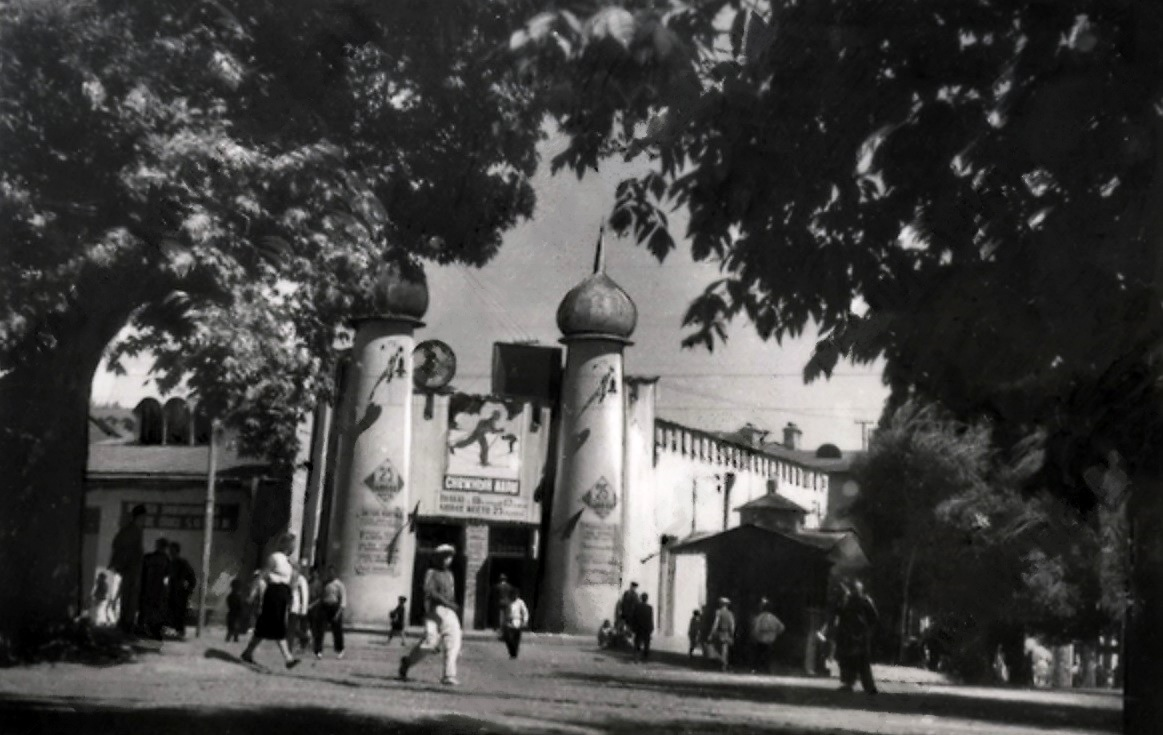
A winter cinema in Tashkent, 1930

During the postwar period, the Soviet Union established numerous scientific and engineering facilities in Tashkent.

On 10 January 1966, then Indian Prime Minister Lal Bahadur Shastri and Pakistan President Ayub Khan signed a pact in Tashkent with Soviet Premier Alexei Kosygin as the mediator to resolve the terms of peace after the Indo-Pakistani War of 1965. On the next day, Shastri died suddenly, reportedly due to a heart attack. It is widely speculated that Shastri was killed by poison in the water he drank.

Much of Tashkent's old city was destroyed by a powerful earthquake on 26 April 1966. More than 300,000 residents were left homeless, and some 78,000 poorly engineered homes were destroyed, mainly in the densely populated areas of the old city where traditional adobe housing predominated. The Soviet republics, and some other countries, such as Finland, sent "battalions of fraternal peoples" and urban planners to help rebuild devastated Tashkent.

Tashkent was rebuilt as a model Soviet city with wide streets planted with shade trees, parks, immense plazas for parades, fountains, monuments, and acres of apartment blocks. The Tashkent Metro was also built during this time. About 100,000 new homes were built by 1970, but the builders occupied many, rather than the homeless residents of Tashkent. Further development in the following years increased the size of the city with major new developments in the Chilonzor area, north-east and south-east of the city.

At the time of the collapse of the Soviet Union in 1991, Tashkent was the fourth-largest city in the USSR and a center of learning in the fields of science and engineering. Due to the 1966 earthquake and the Soviet redevelopment, little architectural heritage has survived of Tashkent's ancient history. Few structures mark its significance as a trading point on the historic Silk Road. Such countries of the Soviet Union as Azerbaijan and Armenia, Kazakhstan and Georgia, Belarus and Kyrgyzstan, Turkmenistan and Tajikistan, Latvia, Moldova, Estonia helped restore the city after the earthquake and erected many modern buildings.

=== Capital of Uzbekistan ===
Tashkent is the capital of Uzbekistan, noted for its tree-lined streets, fountains and parks. In 2009, the local government initiated a controversial tree-cutting campaign.

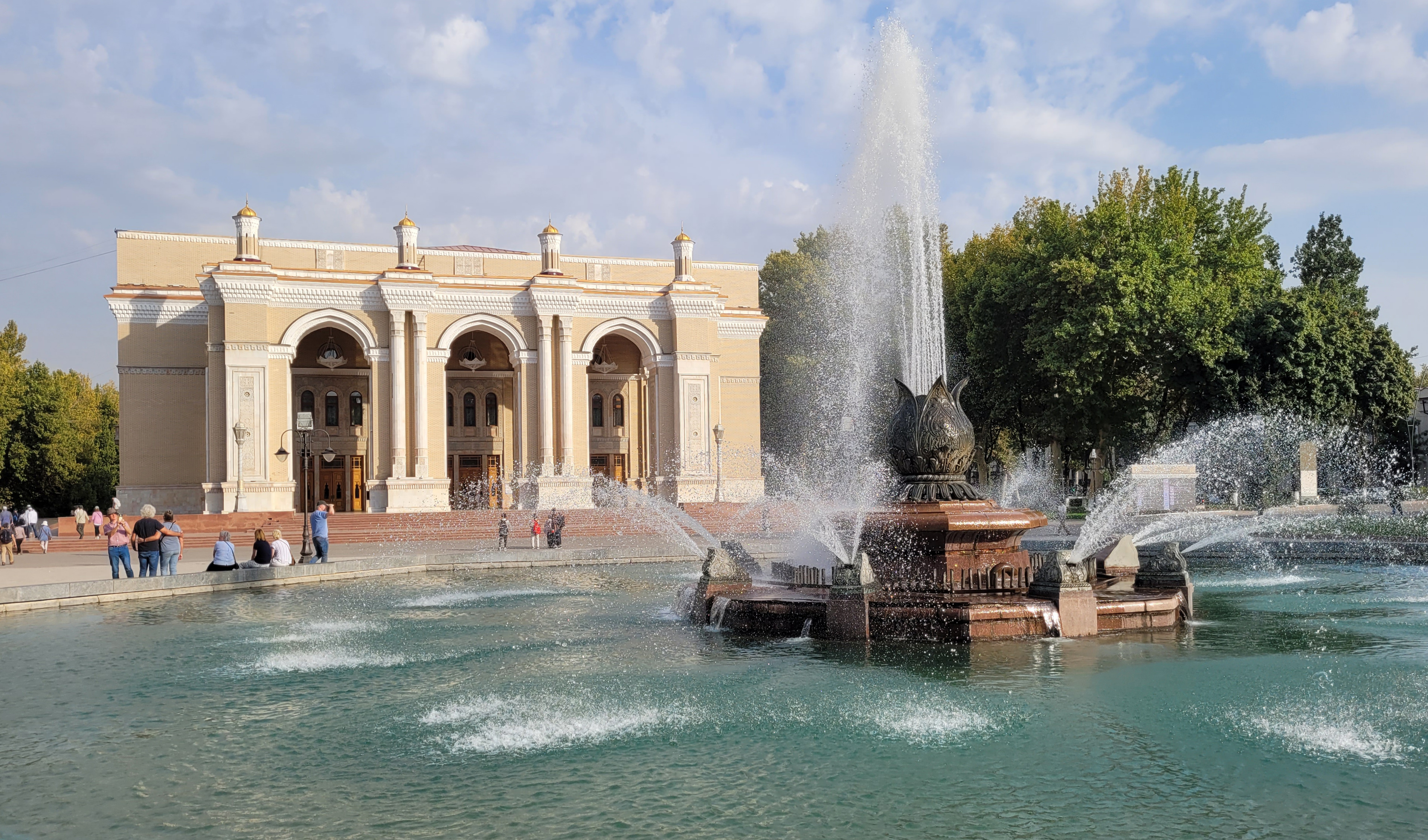
Alisher Navoi Opera and Ballet Theatre

Since 1991, the city has changed economically, culturally, and architecturally. New development has superseded or replaced icons of the Soviet era. The largest statue ever erected for Lenin was replaced with a globe, featuring a geographic map of Uzbekistan. Buildings from the Soviet era have been replaced with new modern buildings. The "Downtown Tashkent" district includes the 22-story NBU Bank building, international hotels, the International Business Center, and the Plaza Building.

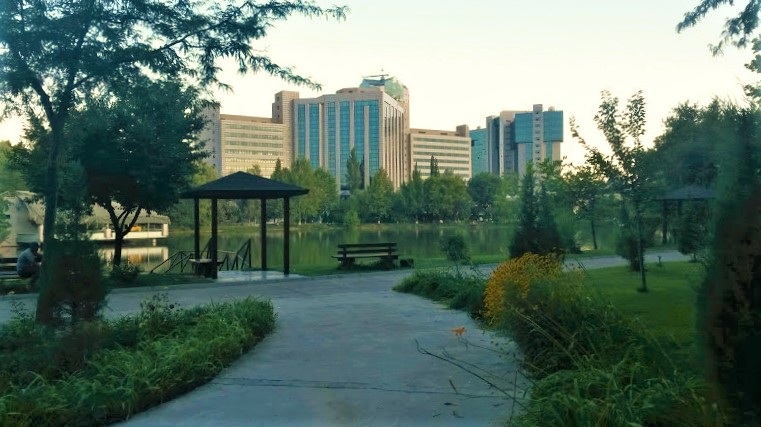
Japanese Gardens in Tashkent

The Tashkent Business district is a special district, established for the development of small, medium and large businesses in Uzbekistan. In 2018, construction began on a new Downtown which would include a business district with skyscrapers of local and foreign companies, world hotels such as Hilton Tashkent Hotel, apartments, malls, shops and other entertainment. The construction of the International Business Center is planned to be completed by the end of 2021. Fitch assigns "BB−" rating to Tashkent city, "Stable" forecast.

In 2007, Tashkent was named a "cultural capital of the Islamic world" by Moscow News, as the city has numerous historic mosques and significant Islamic sites, including the Islamic University. Tashkent holds the Samarkand Kufic Quran, an important Islamic relic and one of the earliest written copies of the Quran, which has been located in the city since its repatriation to Turkestan by the Bolsheviks in August 1923.

Tashkent is the most visited city in the country, and has greatly benefited from increasing tourism as a result of reforms under president Shavkat Mirziyoyev and opening up by abolishing visas for visitors from the European Union and other developing countries or making visas easier for foreigners.

=== Tashkent over the years ===
Development of Tashkent

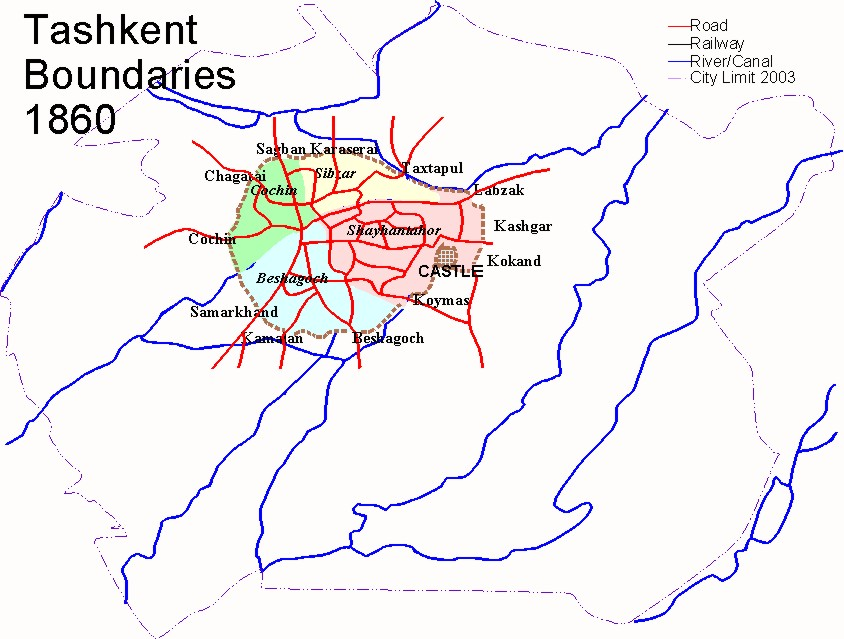
c. 1865

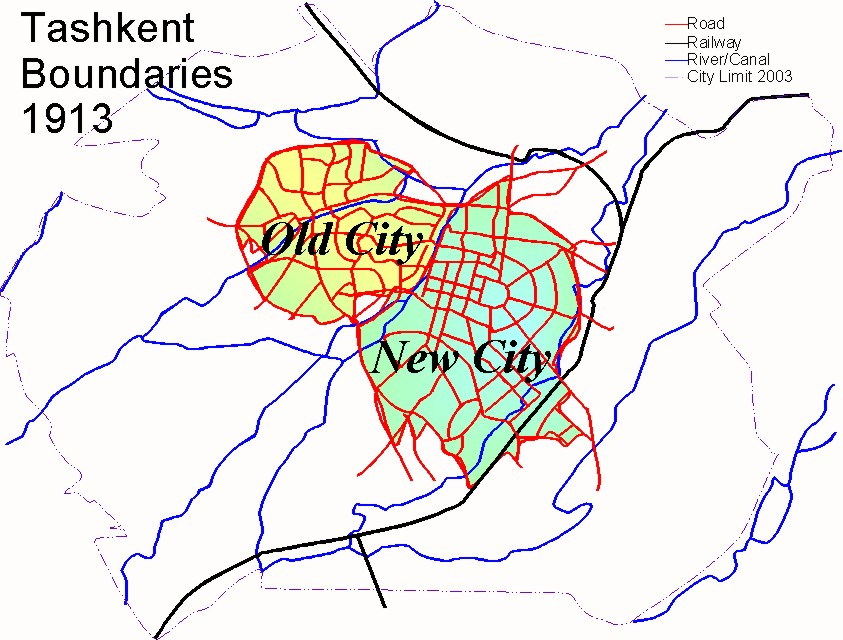
1913

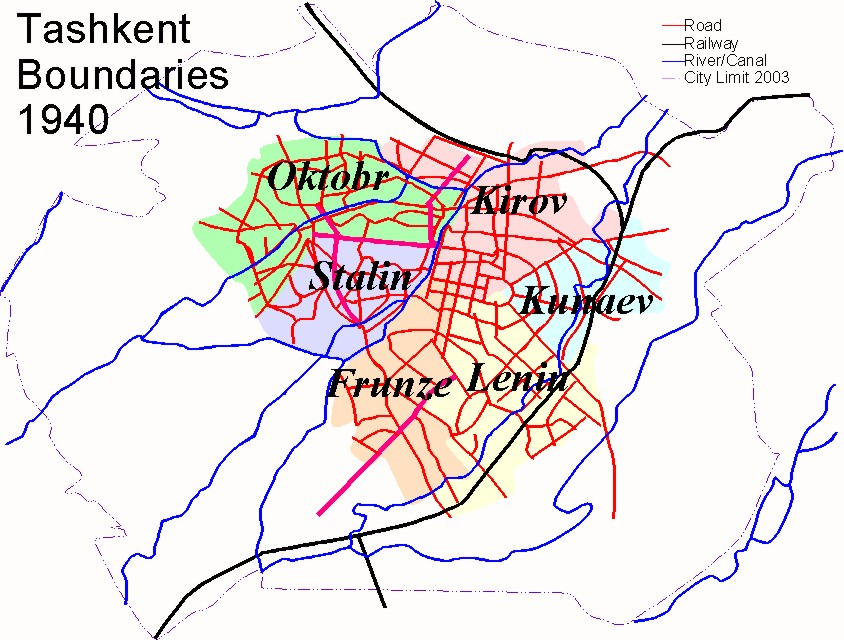
1940

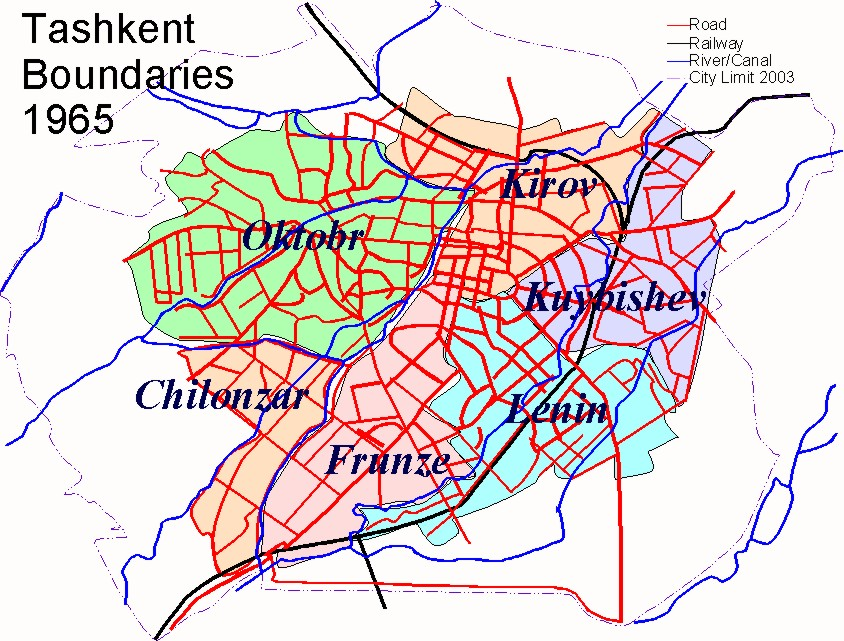
1965

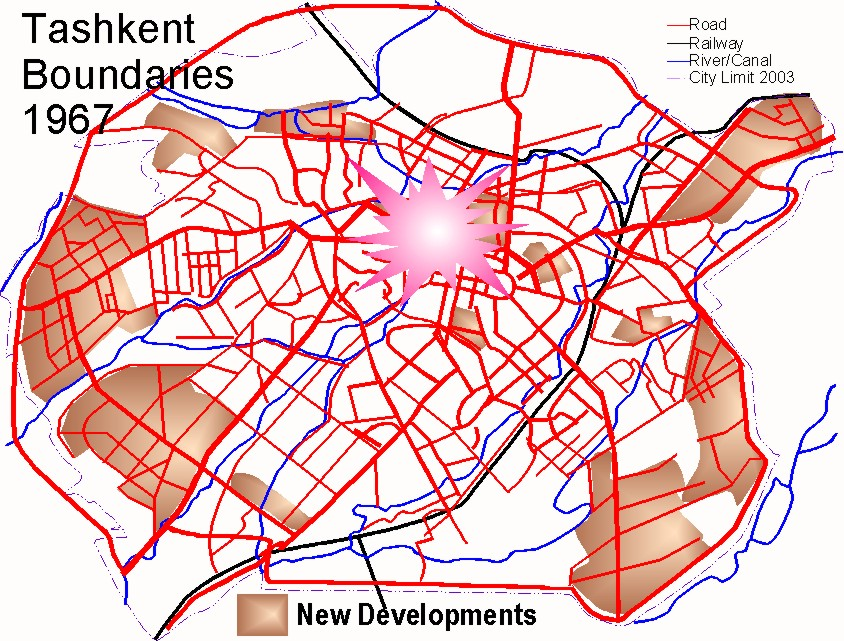
1966: earthquake and subsequent redevelopment

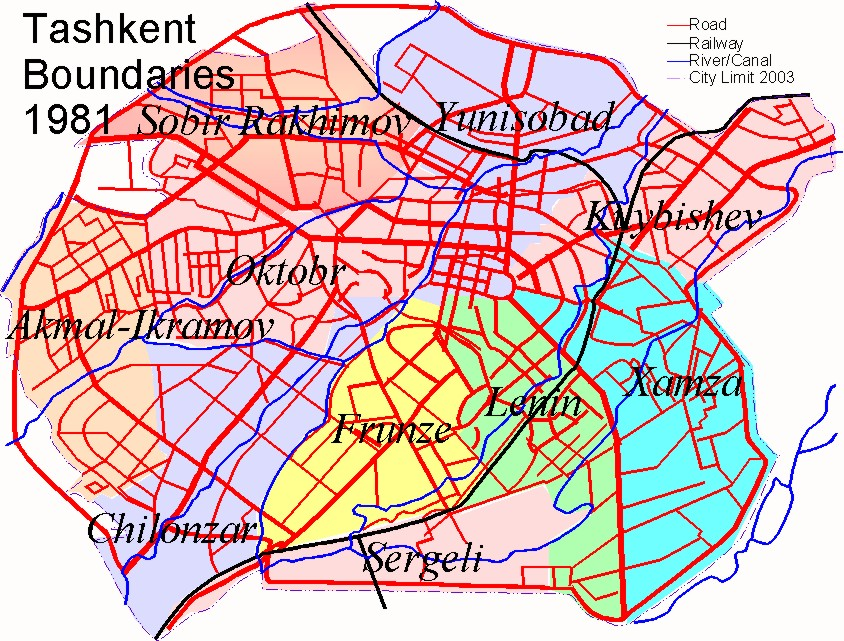
1981

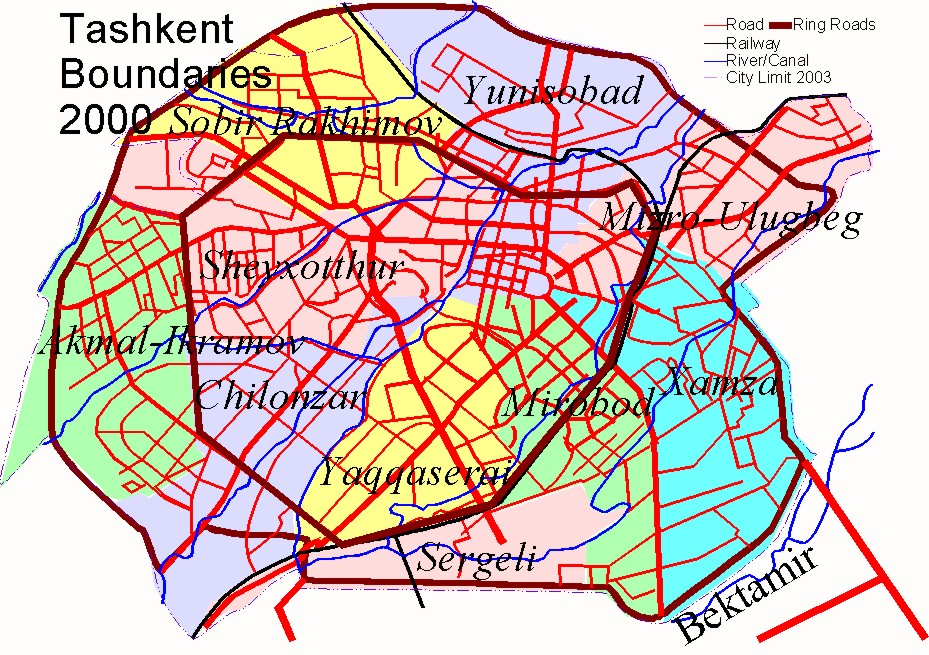
2000

=== The invention of television ===
In the summer of 1928, the first fully electronic television set was presented to the public in Tashkent. Boris Grabovsky's method, patented in Saratov in 1925, proposed a new model of television imaging based on vertical and horizontal electron beam sweeping under high voltage. This principle of television imaging is now used in practically all modern cathode-ray tubes. The historian and ethnographer Boris Golender (Russian: Борис Голендер) described this event in a video lecture. This date of the demonstration of the fully electronic television set is the earliest known so far. Despite this, most modern historians controversially consider Vladimir Zworykin and Philo Farnsworth to be the inventors of the first fully electronic television set. In 1964, the contribution made to the development of early television by Grabovsky was officially acknowledged by the Uzbek government, and he was awarded the prestigious title of 'Honourable Inventor of the Uzbek Soviet Socialist Republic'.

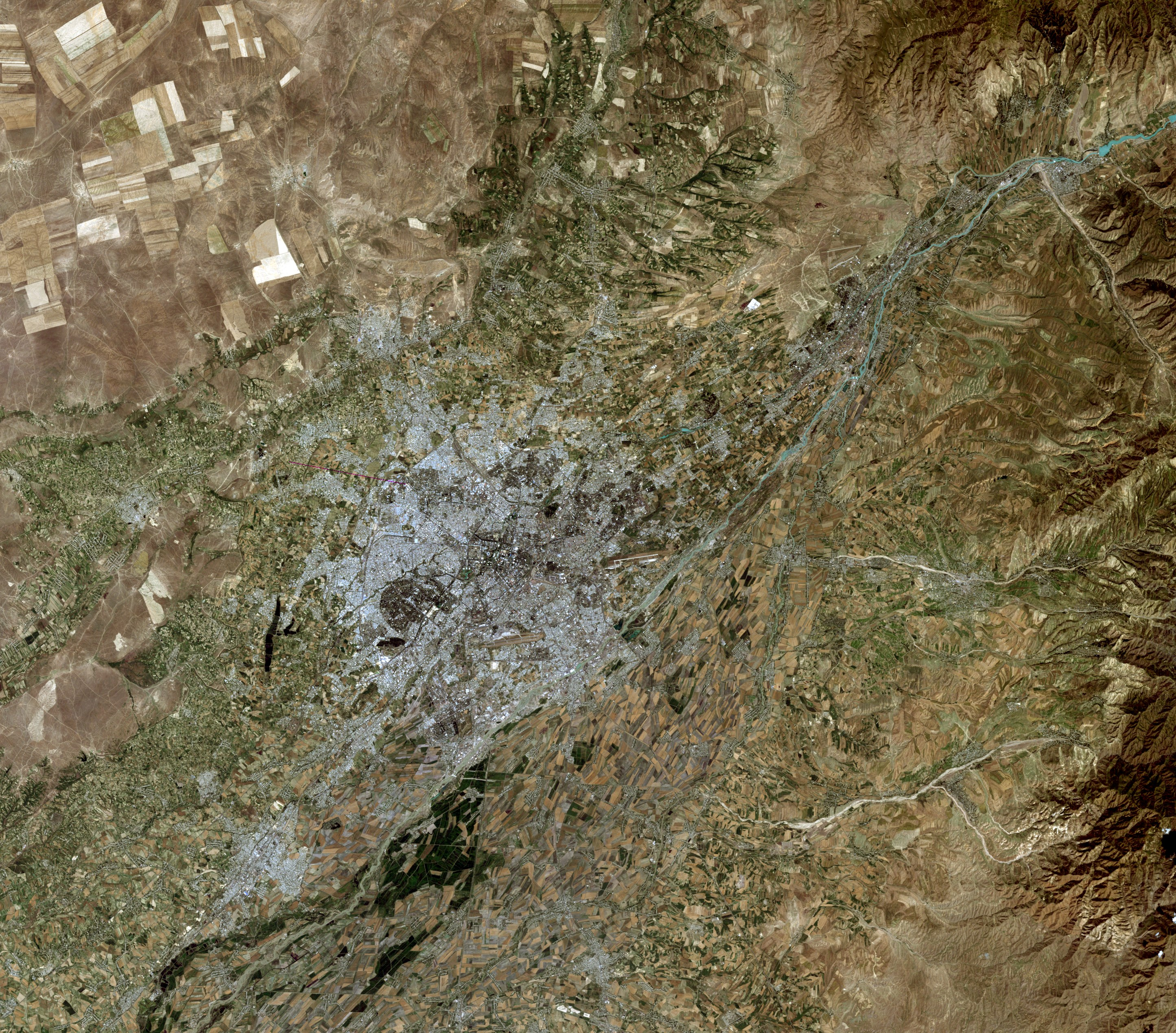
Tashkent and vicinity, satellite image Landsat 5, 30 June 2010

== Geography ==
Tashkent is situated on a well-watered plain on the road between Samarkand, Uzbekistan's second city, and Shymkent, just across the border in Kazakhstan. Tashkent lies only 13 km from two border crossings into Kazakhstan.

The nearest cities with populations of over 1 million are: Shymkent (Kazakhstan), Dushanbe (Tajikistan), Bishkek (Kyrgyzstan), Kashgar (China), Almaty (Kazakhstan), Kabul (Afghanistan), and Peshawar (Pakistan).

Tashkent sits at the confluence of the Chirchiq River and several of its tributaries, and is built on deep alluvial deposits up to 15 m (49 ft) in depth. The city is located in an active tectonic area, suffering from numerous tremors and occasional earthquakes.

The local time in Tashkent is UTC/GMT +5 hours.

=== Climate ===
Tashkent

Climate chart (precipitation, max. and min. temperature)
J	F	M	A	M	J	J	A	S	O	N	D
55 6 −3	47 8 −2	72 14 4	64 22 10	32 27 14	7.1 33 18	3.5 36 19	2 34 17	4.5 29 12	34 21 7	45 14 3	53 9 0
- █ Average max. and min. temperatures in °C
- █ Precipitation totals in mm
- Source: WMO
Imperial conversion
J	F	M	A	M	J	J	A	S	O	N	D
2.1 42 26	1.8 46 29	2.8 58 40	2.5 71 50	1.3 81 57	0.3 92 64	0.1 96 67	0.1 93 63	0.2 84 54	1.3 70 45	1.8 58 38	2.1 47 31
- █ Average max. and min. temperatures in °F
- █ Precipitation totals in inches

Tashkent features a Mediterranean climate (Köppen: Csa) with some humid continental climate influences (Köppen: Dsa). As a result, it experiences cold and often snowy winters—not typically associated with most Mediterranean climates—and long, hot, and dry summers. Most precipitation occurs during the winter, often falling as snow. The city experiences two peaks of precipitation: one in early winter and another in spring. This slightly unusual precipitation pattern is partially due to its altitude of 500 m (1,600 ft). Summers in Tashkent are long, usually lasting from May to September, and can be extremely hot, particularly during July and August. The city also sees very little precipitation during the summer, especially from June through September.

Climate data for Tashkent (1991–2020 normals, extremes 1867–present)
Month	Jan	Feb	Mar	Apr	May	Jun	Jul	Aug	Sep	Oct	Nov	Dec	Year
Record high °C (°F)	22.6 (72.7)	27.0 (80.6)	32.5 (90.5)	36.6 (97.9)	39.9 (103.8)	43.0 (109.4)	44.6 (112.3)	43.1 (109.6)	40.0 (104.0)	37.5 (99.5)	31.6 (88.9)	27.3 (81.1)	44.6 (112.3)
Mean daily maximum °C (°F)	7.2 (45.0)	9.5 (49.1)	16.0 (60.8)	22.3 (72.1)	28.0 (82.4)	33.6 (92.5)	35.9 (96.6)	34.9 (94.8)	29.5 (85.1)	22.2 (72.0)	14.1 (57.4)	8.6 (47.5)	21.8 (71.3)
Daily mean °C (°F)	2.3 (36.1)	4.2 (39.6)	10.2 (50.4)	15.9 (60.6)	21.1 (70.0)	26.2 (79.2)	28.3 (82.9)	26.6 (79.9)	21.0 (69.8)	14.4 (57.9)	8.1 (46.6)	3.5 (38.3)	15.2 (59.3)
Mean daily minimum °C (°F)	−1.3 (29.7)	0.1 (32.2)	5.3 (41.5)	10.1 (50.2)	14.3 (57.7)	18.4 (65.1)	20.1 (68.2)	18.4 (65.1)	13.4 (56.1)	8.3 (46.9)	3.6 (38.5)	−0.1 (31.8)	9.2 (48.6)
Record low °C (°F)	−28 (−18)	−25.6 (−14.1)	−16.9 (1.6)	−6.3 (20.7)	−1.7 (28.9)	3.8 (38.8)	8.2 (46.8)	5.7 (42.3)	0.1 (32.2)	−11.2 (11.8)	−22.1 (−7.8)	−29.5 (−21.1)	−29.5 (−21.1)
Average precipitation mm (inches)	54.9 (2.16)	72.1 (2.84)	66.4 (2.61)	63.3 (2.49)	41.1 (1.62)	16.8 (0.66)	3.4 (0.13)	2.1 (0.08)	4.6 (0.18)	23.7 (0.93)	51.2 (2.02)	58.4 (2.30)	458.0 (18.03)
Average extreme snow depth cm (inches)	3 (1.2)	2 (0.8)	0 (0)	0 (0)	0 (0)	0 (0)	0 (0)	0 (0)	0 (0)	0 (0)	0 (0)	2 (0.8)	3 (1.2)
Average precipitation days (≥ 1.0 mm)	14	14	14	13	11	8	4	3	4	8	11	13	117
Average rainy days	14	13	14	12	11	7	4	3	3	7	10	12	110
Average snowy days	9	7	2	0	0	0	0	0	0	1	2	6	27
Average relative humidity (%)	73	68	61	60	53	40	39	42	45	57	66	73	56
Mean monthly sunshine hours	104.7	119.4	169.2	222.7	303.0	352.8	386.5	353.4	283.8	220.4	135.0	104.7	2,755.6
Source 1: Pogoda.ru.net
Source 2: NOAA

== Ecology ==
The level of air pollution in Tashkent, especially in winter, significantly exceeds international norms. According to the World Bank, the average annual pollution level is more than six times higher than the WHO recommended level (5 μg/m^{3}). The main sources of air pollution are the heating sector (28%), transport (16%), and industry (13%). There are 631 greenhouses around the city; according to the Ecological Party of Uzbekistan, 60% of them use coal and, sometimes, rubber tyres and other fuels. As of the end of 2025, Tashkent regularly ranks among the most polluted megacities in the world, according to IQAir data.

== Demographics ==
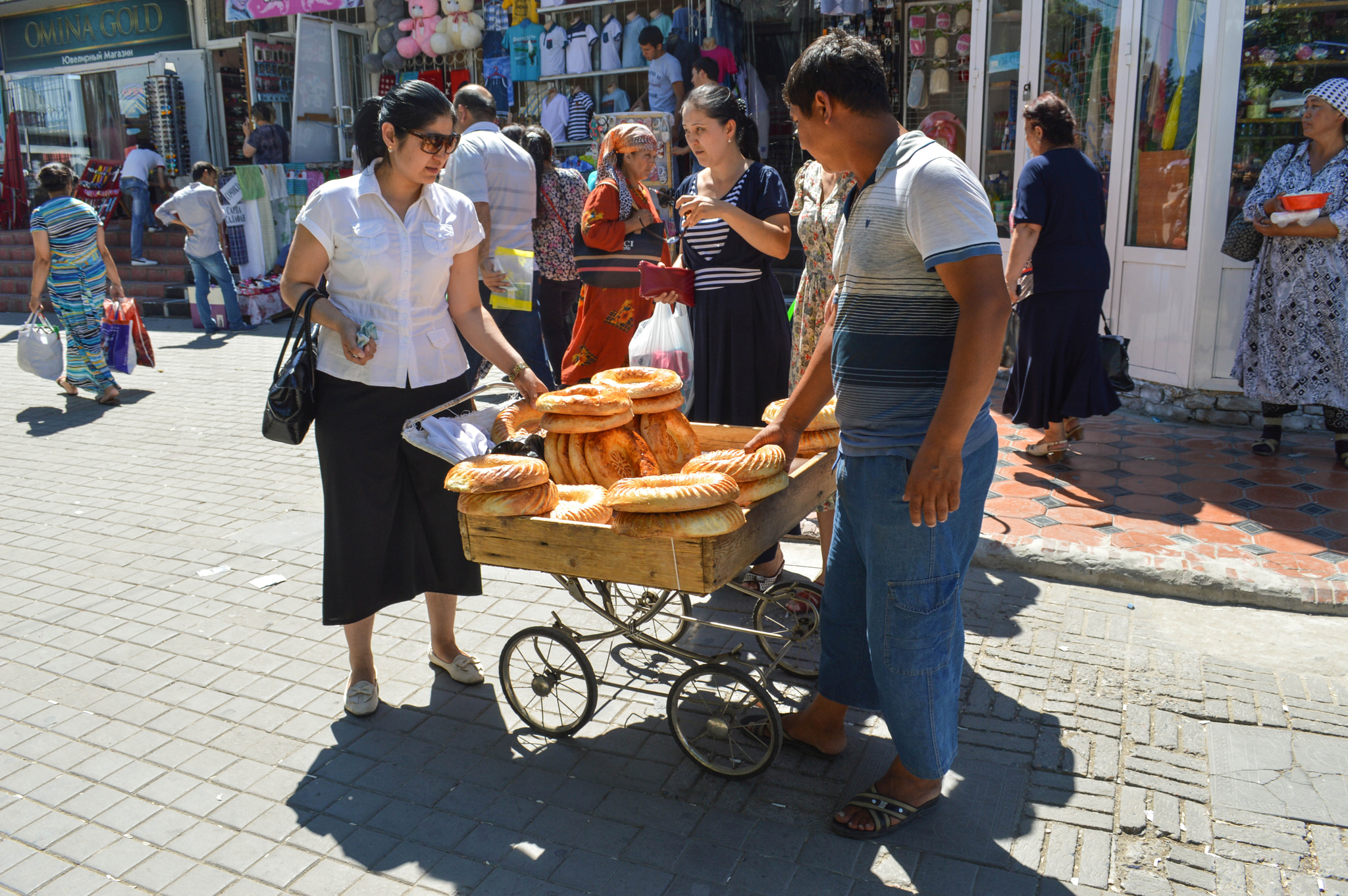
Bread vendor in a market street of Tashkent

In 1983, the population of Tashkent amounted to 1,902,000 people living in a municipal area of 256 km^{2} (99 sq mi). By 1991, the year the Soviet Union dissolved, the city's population had grown to approximately 2,136,600.

Tashkent's population was approximately 3,178,000 at the start of 2026, making it the fourth largest city in the former USSR, after Moscow, Saint Petersburg (formerly Leningrad), and Kyiv.

According to Uzbekistan's National Committee on Statistics, in 2021, the demographic breakdown of Tashkent's population was:

- 84.4% – Uzbeks
- 4.9% – Tajiks
- 2.4% – Kazakhs
- 2.2% – Karakalpaks
- 2.1% – Russians
- 4.1% – other ethnic backgrounds.

Historical population

Year	Pop.	±% p.a.
1897	155,673	—
1959	911,930	+2.89%
1970	1,384,509	+3.87%
1979	1,780,002	+2.83%
1983	1,902,000	+1.67%
1989	2,072,459	+1.44%
1991	2,130,200	+1.38%
1995	2,097,400	−0.39%
2000	2,142,300	+0.42%
2001	2,137,900	−0.21%
2002	2,136,600	−0.06%
2003	2,139,200	+0.12%
2004	2,135,400	−0.18%
2005	2,135,700	+0.01%
2006	2,140,600	+0.23%

Year	Pop.	±% p.a.
2007	2,157,100	+0.77%
2008	2,180,000	+1.06%
2009	2,206,300	+1.21%
2010	2,234,300	+1.27%
2011	2,296,500	+2.78%
2012	2,309,300	+0.56%
2013	2,340,900	+1.37%
2014	2,352,900	+0.51%
2015	2,371,300	+0.78%
2016	2,393,200	+0.92%
2017	2,424,100	+1.29%
2018	2,464,900	+1.68%
2019	2,509,900	+1.83%
2020	2,571,700	+2.46%
2021	2,694,400	+4.77%

Source: Uzbekistan State Statistics Committee and Demoscope.ru

Uzbek is the main spoken language in Tashkent, though Russian is also used as a lingua franca. As in much of Uzbekistan, signage in Tashkent often contains a mix of Latin and Cyrillic scripts.

Tashkent is the centre of the Greek community in Uzbekistan, which formed as a result of mass population transfers during the Soviet era. Thousands of Pontic Greeks were forcibly displaced in the early 1940s, and after the defeat of the Democratic Army of Greece and the Communist Party of Greece in 1949, another wave of Greeks arrived in Central Asia. The Soviet Union sent approximately 11,000 refugees of the Greek Civil War to Tashkent, where a Greek community survives to this day. In the early 1980s, following the decriminalisation of the Greek Communist Party, many returned to Greece.

== Districts ==
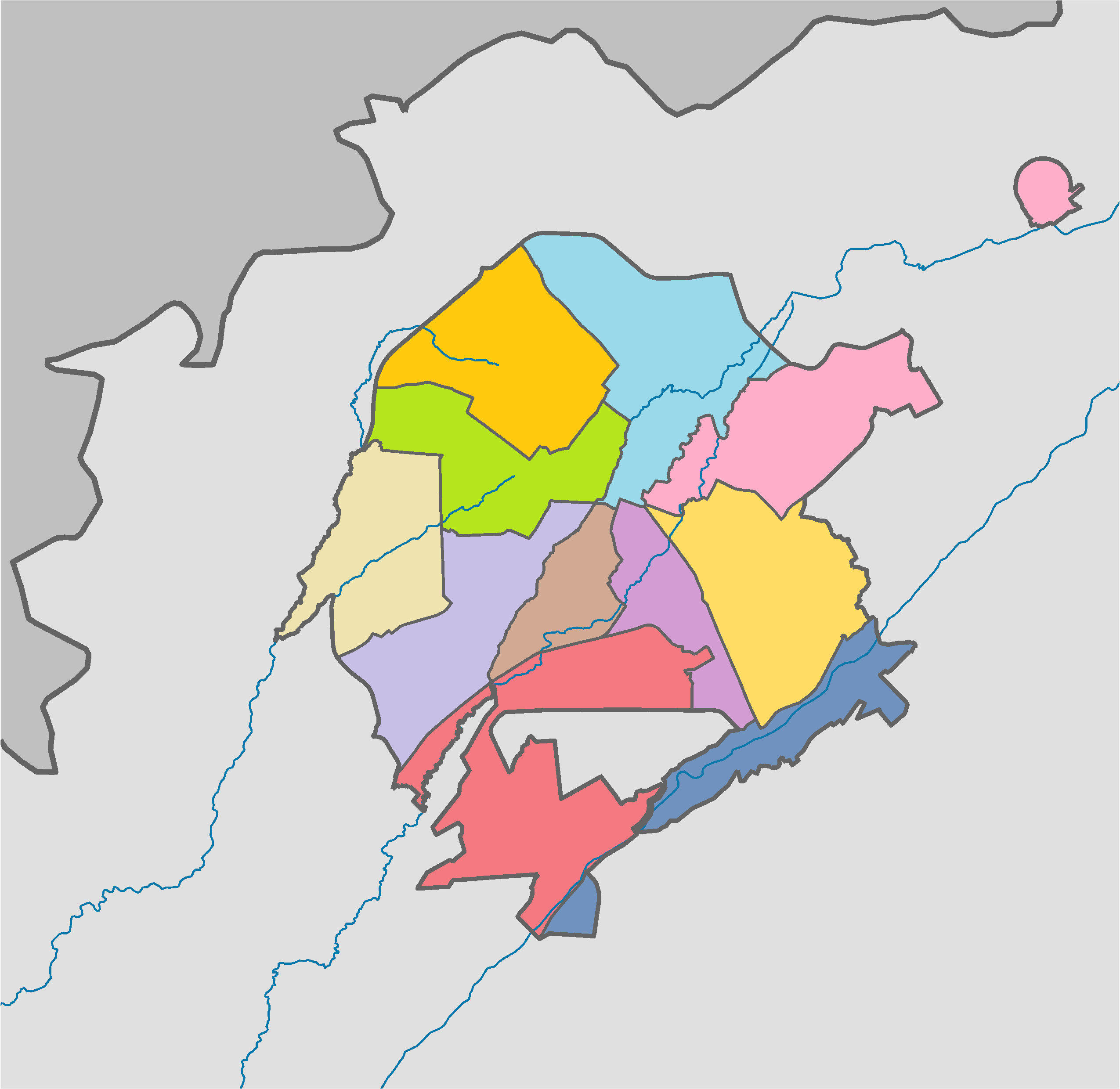

Since 2020, when Yangihayot District was created, Tashkent has been divided into the following 12 districts (Uzbek: tumanlar):

Nr	District	Population (2021)	Area (km^{2})	Density (area/km^{2})	Map
1	Bektemir	31,400	17.83	1,761	
2	Chilanzar	260,700	29.94	8,707	
3	Yashnobod	258,800	33.7	7,680	
4	Mirobod	142,800	17.1	8,351	
5	Mirzo Ulugbek	285,000	35.15	8,108	
6	Sergeli	105,700	37.36	2,829	
7	Shayxontoxur	348,300	29.7	11,727	
8	Olmazor	377,100	34.5	10,930	
9	Uchtepa	278,200	24	11,592	
10	Yakkasaray	121,600	14.6	8,329	
11	Yunusabad	352,000	40.6	8,670	
12	Yangihayot	132,800	44.20	3,005	

There has also been planning to make a new district named "New Tashkent", southeast of the center, which would resemble Saint-Petersburg in its architecture.

Before Tashkent was conquered by the Russian Empire, it was divided into four districts, or daha in Uzbek:

1. Beshyoghoch
2. Kukcha
3. Shaykhontokhur
4. Sebzor

In 1940 it had the following districts (Russian район):

1. Oktyabr
2. Kirov
3. Stalin
4. Frunze
5. Lenin
6. Kuybishev

By 1981, these were reorganized into the following:

1. Bektemir
2. Akmal-Ikramov (Uchtepa)
3. Khamza (Yashnobod)
4. Lenin (Mirobod)
5. Kuybishev (Mirzo Ulugbek)
6. Sergeli
7. Oktober (Shaykhontokhur)
8. Sobir Rakhimov (Olmazar)
9. Chilanzar
10. Frunze (Yakkasaray)
11. Kirov (Yunusabad)

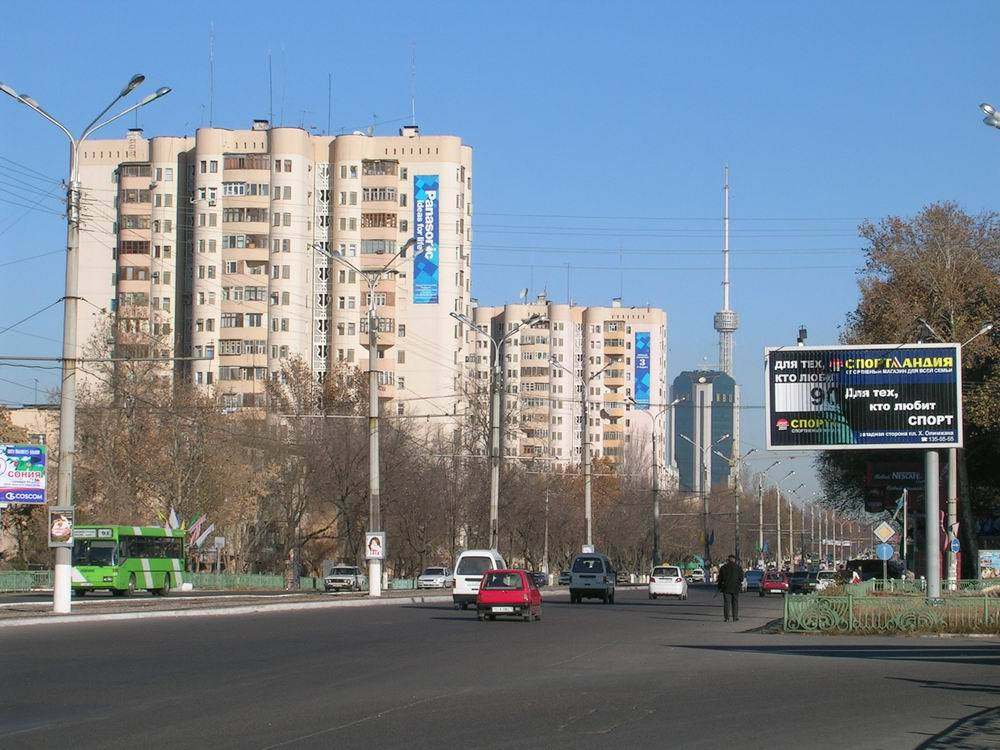
Amir Timur Street in 2006

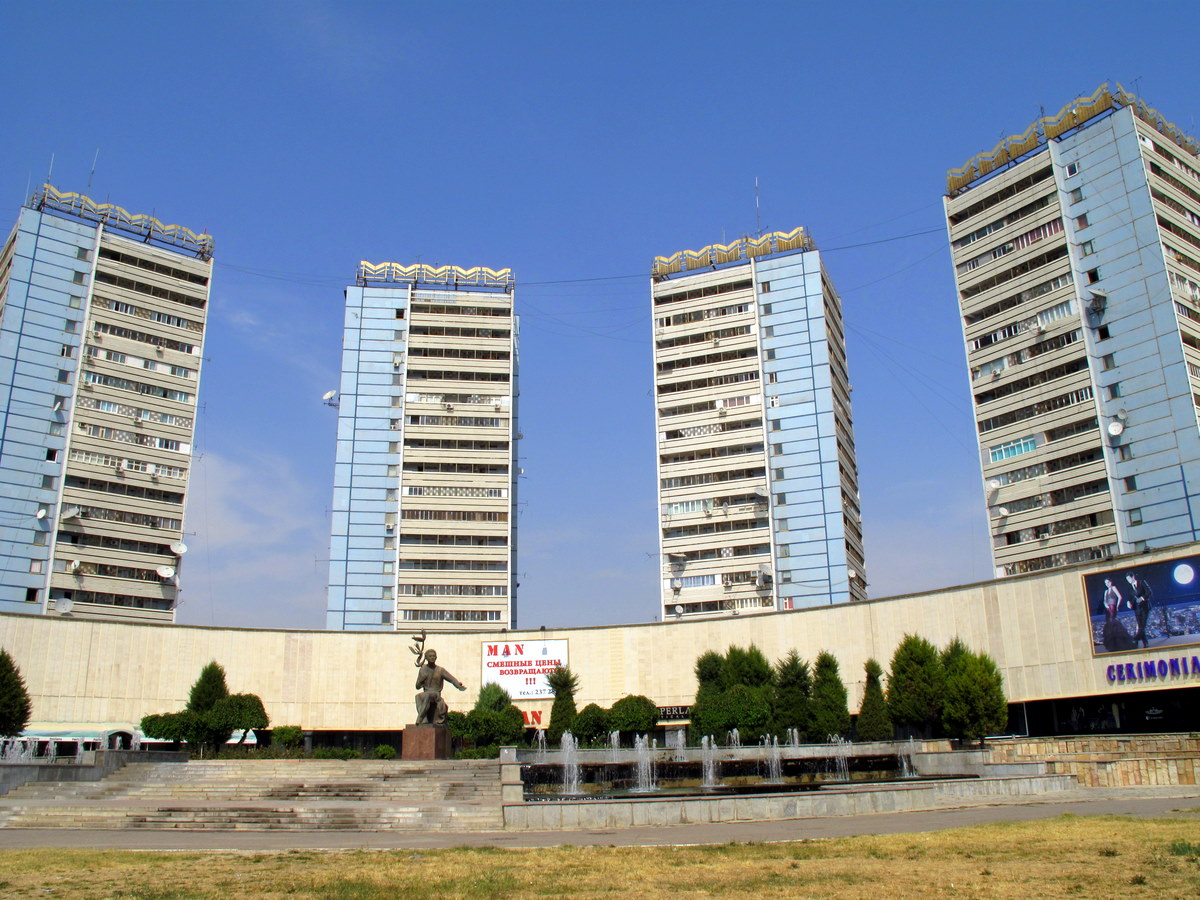
Residential towers

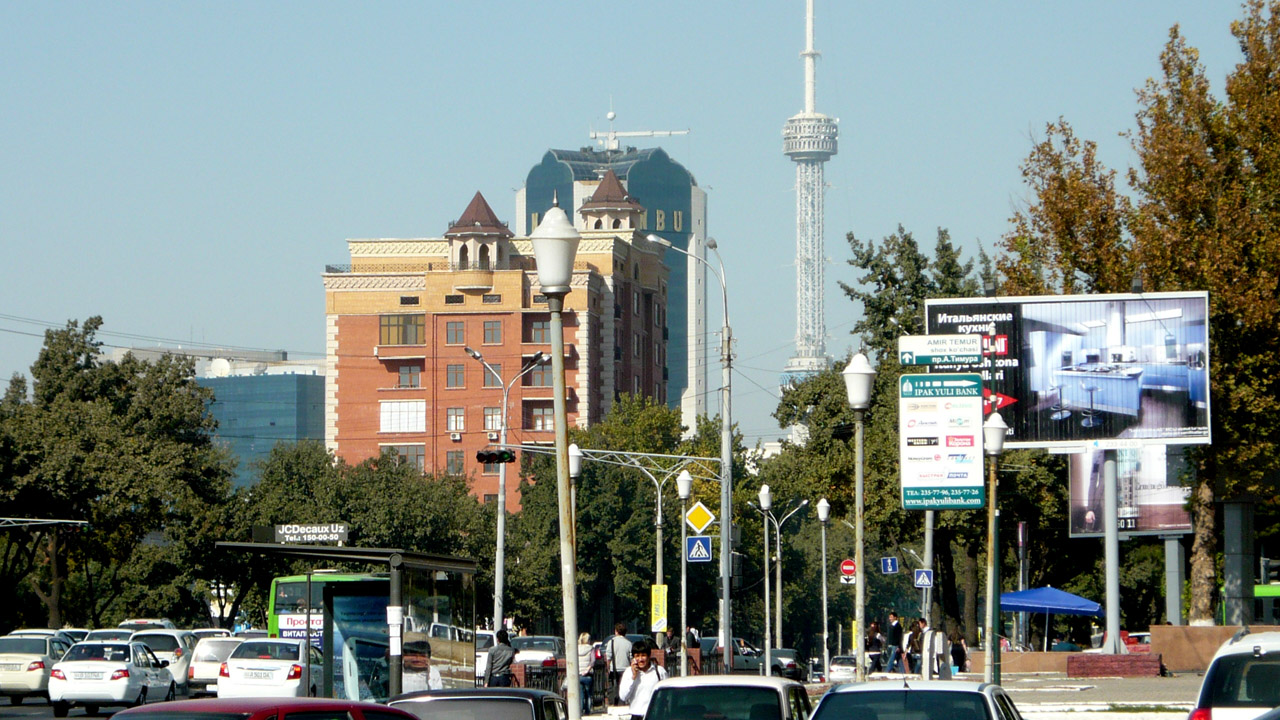
A downtown street in 2012

== Landmarks ==
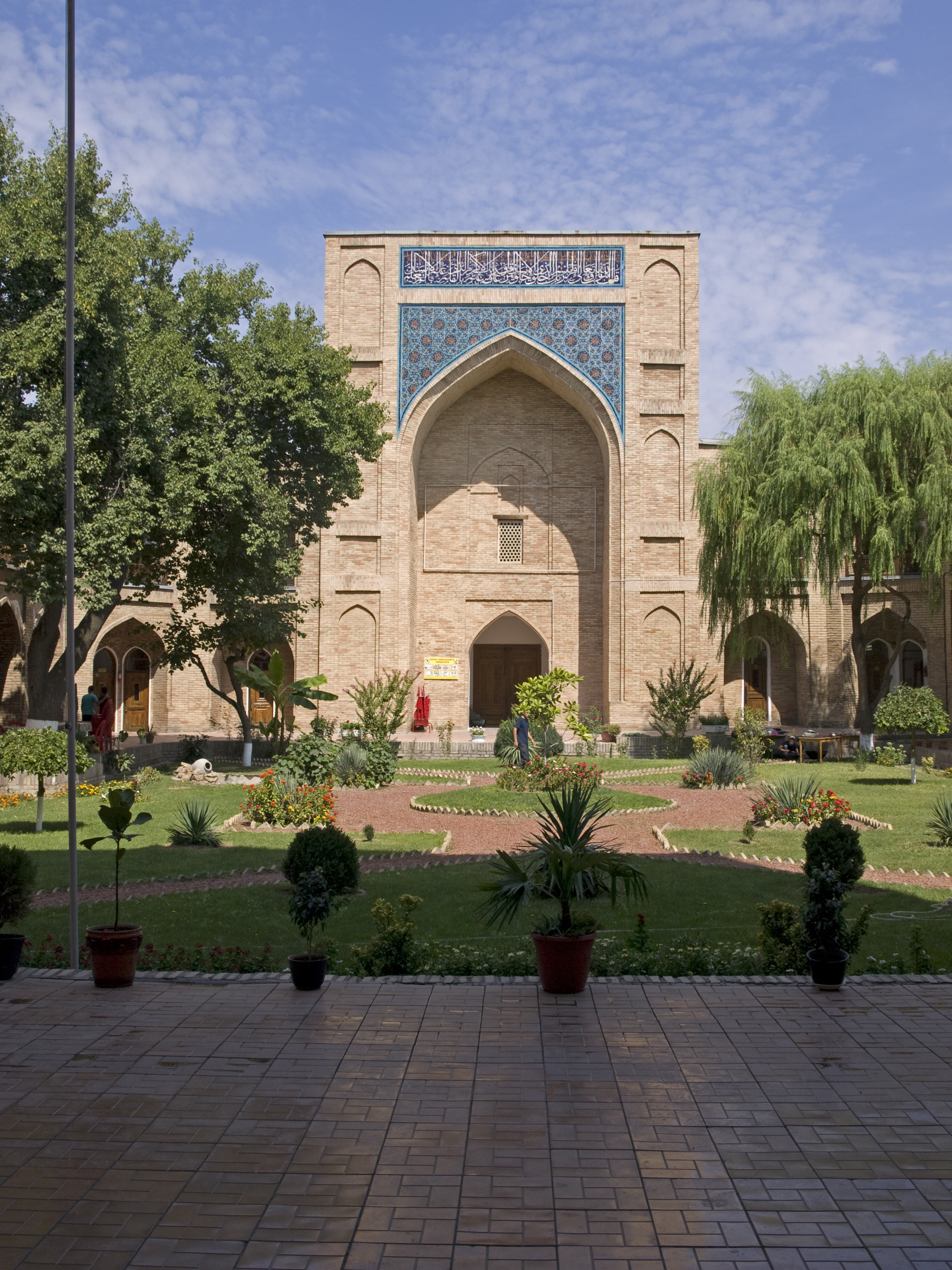
Kukeldash Madrasa inner yard

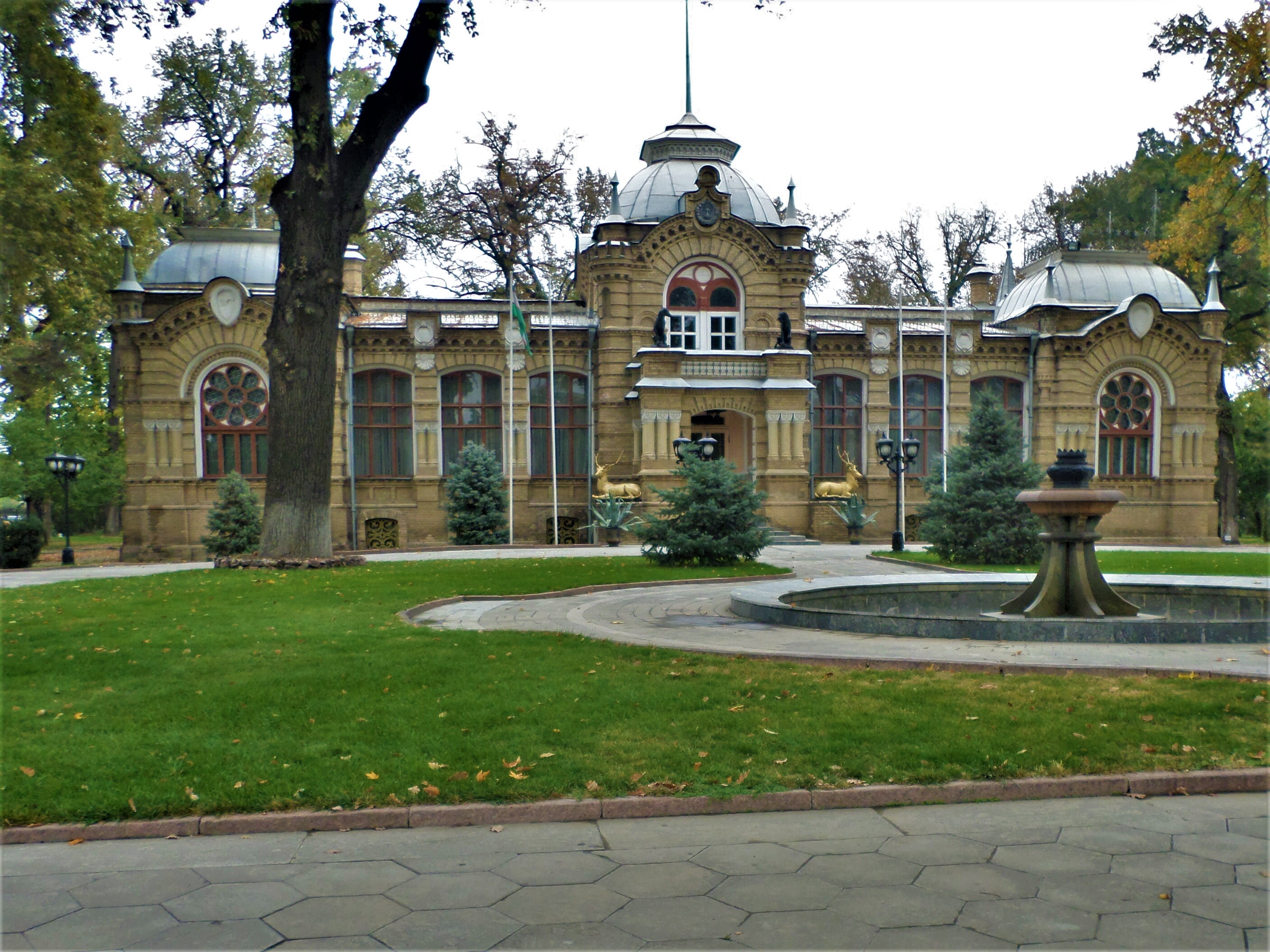
Prince Romanov Palace

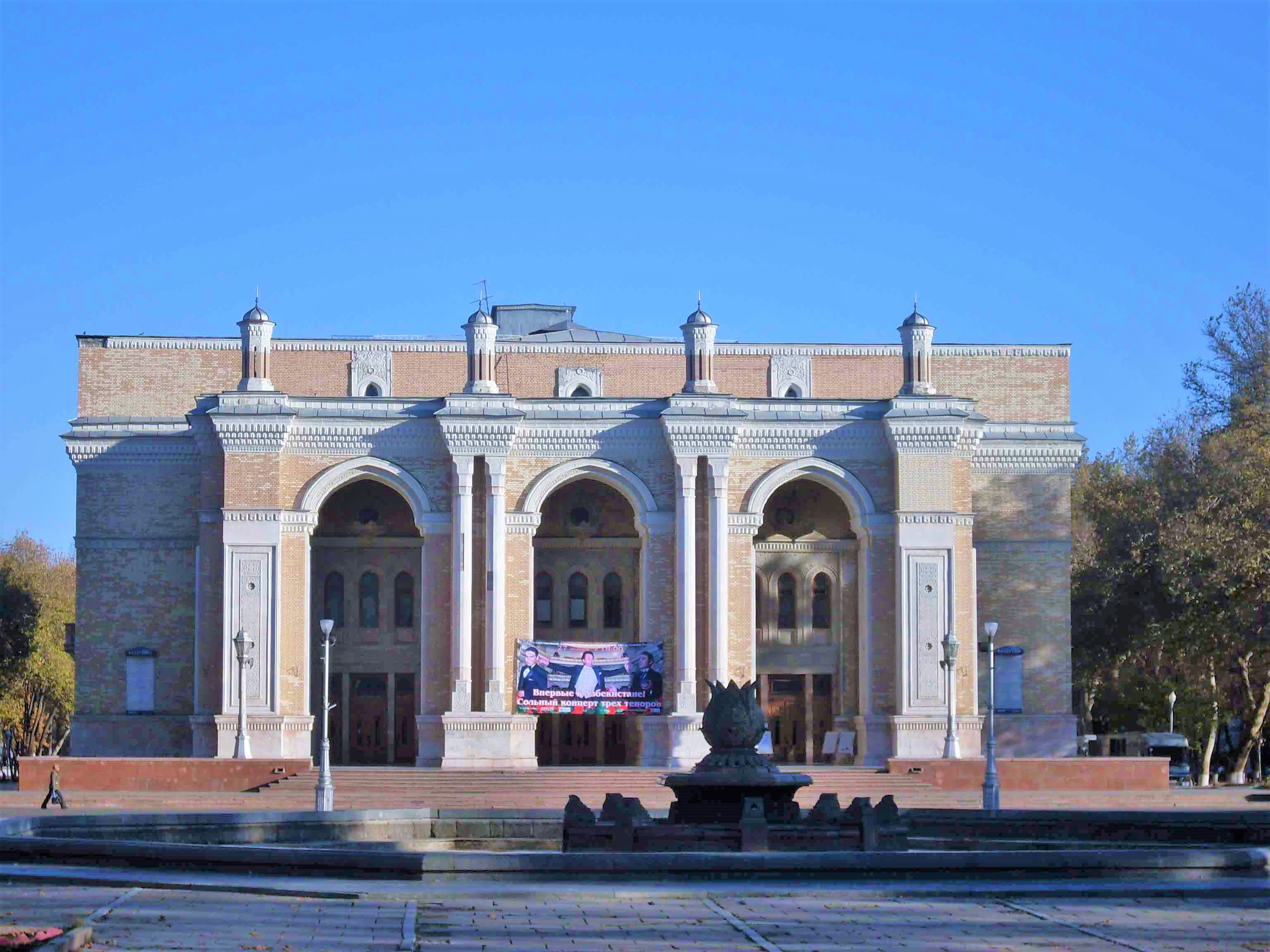
Alisher Navoi Opera and Ballet Theatre

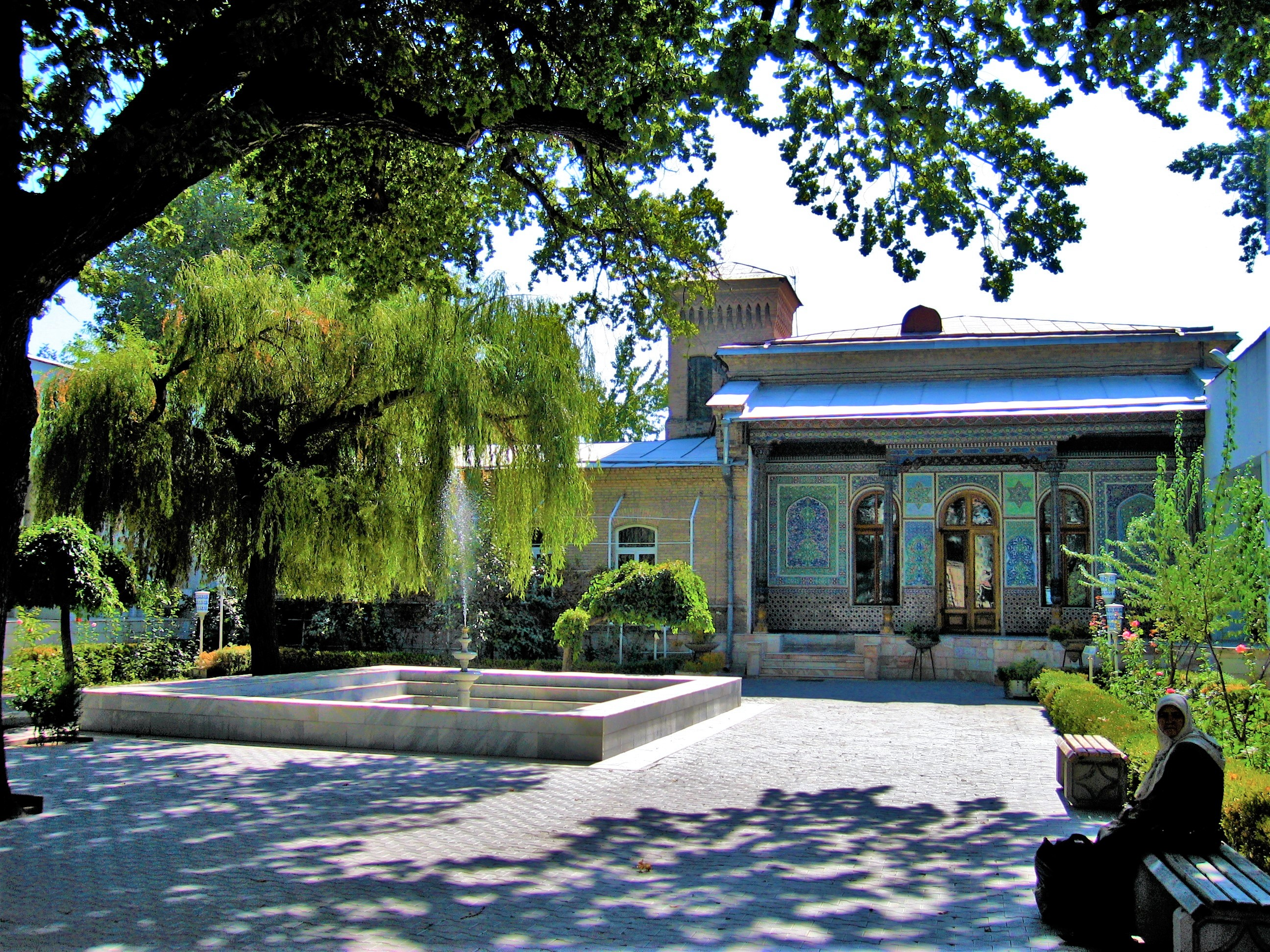
Museum of Applied Arts

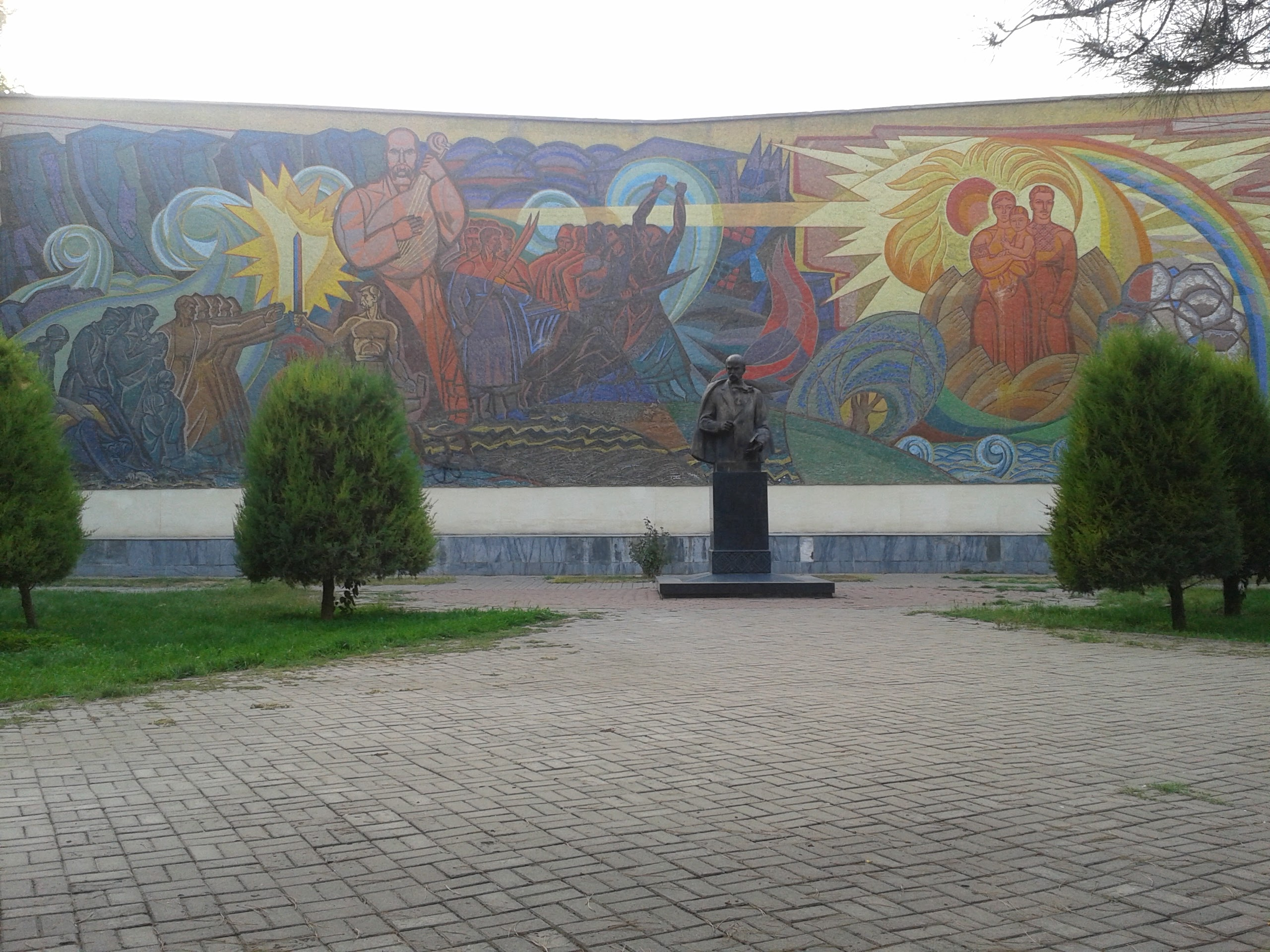
A statue commemorating Taras Shevchenko

The Hotel Uzbekistan, which opened in 1974

Although most of the ancient city was destroyed during the 1917 revolution and the 1966 earthquake, Tashkent has many museums and Soviet-era monuments:

- Kukeldash Madrasah. Dating back to the reign of Abdullah Khan II (1557–1598), it is being restored by the provincial Religious Board of Mawarannahr Muslims. There is talk of making it into a museum, but it is currently being used as a madrasah.
- Chorsu Bazaar, located near the Kukeldash Madrasah, is an open-air bazaar in the centre of the old town of Tashkent.
- Hazrati Imam Complex includes several mosques, a shrine, and a library.
- Center for Islamic Civilization, which holds the Samarkand Kufic Quran, one of the oldest extant Qurans in the world, which claims to be stained with the blood of the martyred third caliph Uthman ibn Affan. Looted from Samarkand as a war trophy in 1868 during the Russian conquest of Central Asia and taken to Saint Petersburg, it was repatriated to Tashkent in 1923 by the Bolsheviks.
- Qaffol Shoshi mausoleum, built in honour of Imam Abu Bakr Muhammad ibn Ali ibn Ismail al-Kaffal ash-Shashi. The original tomb did not survive in its initial form. In its current state, the mausoleum was constructed in 1542 by the royal architect of the time, Gulyam Husayn. It is an asymmetrical domed portal mausoleum, known as a khanqah.
- Yunus Khan Mausoleum. It is a group of three 15th-century mausoleums, restored in the 19th century. The largest is the grave of Yunus Khan, grandfather of Mughal Empire founder Babur.
- Palace of Prince Romanov. During the 19th century, Grand Duke Nikolai Konstantinovich, a first cousin of Alexander III of Russia, was banished to Tashkent for some shady deals involving the Russian Crown Jewels. His palace still survives in the centre of the city. Once a museum, it has since been appropriated by the Ministry of Foreign Affairs.
- Alisher Navoi Opera and Ballet Theatre, built by the architect who also designed Lenin's Tomb in Moscow, Aleksey Shchusev, with the labour of Japanese prisoners of war during the Second World War. It hosts Russian ballet and opera.
- Fine Arts Museum of Uzbekistan. It contains a major collection of art from the pre-Russian period, including Sogdian murals, Buddhist statues, and Zoroastrian art, along with a more modern collection of 19th- and 20th-century applied art, such as suzani embroidered hangings. Of more interest is the large collection of paintings "borrowed" from the Hermitage by Grand Duke Romanov to decorate his palace in exile in Tashkent, and never returned. Behind the museum is a small park containing the neglected graves of the Bolsheviks who died in the Russian Revolution of 1917 and during Osipov's treachery in 1919, along with the first Uzbekistani President, Yuldosh Akhunbabayev.
- Museum of Applied Arts. Housed in a traditional house originally commissioned for a wealthy tsarist diplomat, the house itself is the main attraction, rather than its collection of 19th- and 20th-century applied arts.
- State Museum of History of Uzbekistan, the largest museum in the city. It is housed in the former Lenin Museum.
- Amir Timur Museum, housed in a building with a brilliant blue dome and ornate interior. It houses exhibits on Timur and President Islam Karimov. To the south of the museum is Amir Timur Square, where there is a statue of Timur on horseback, surrounded by some of the finest gardens and fountains in the city.
- Navoi Literary Museum, commemorating Uzbekistan's adopted literary hero, Alisher Navoi, with replica manuscripts, Islamic calligraphy, and 15th-century miniature paintings.
- The Tashkent Metro is known for the extravagant design and architecture of its stations. Photography in the system was banned until 2018.

The Russian Orthodox church in Amir Timur Square, built in 1898, was demolished in 2009. The building had not been allowed to be used for religious purposes since the 1920s, due to the anti-religious campaign conducted across the former Soviet Union by the Bolshevik government in Moscow. During the Soviet period, the building was used for various non-religious purposes; after independence, it became a bank.

Tashkent also has a Second World War memorial park and a Defender of the Motherland monument.

== Education ==
Most important scientific institutions of Uzbekistan, such as the Academy of Sciences of Uzbekistan, are located in Tashkent. There are several universities and institutions of higher education:

- Amity University in Tashkent
- New Uzbekistan University
- Tashkent State Pedagogical University
- TEAM University
- The Branch of the Russian State University of Oil and Gas (NRU) named after I.M. Gubkin
- Tashkent Automobile and Road Construction Institute
- Tashkent State Technical University
- Tashkent Institute of Architecture and Construction
- Tashkent Institute of Irrigation and Melioration
- International Business School Kelajak Ilmi
- Tashkent University of Information Technologies
- Westminster International University in Tashkent
- Turin Polytechnic University in Tashkent
- National University of Uzbekistan
- University of World Economy and Diplomacy
- Tashkent State Economic University
- Tashkent State Institute of Law
- Tashkent Financial Institute
- State Conservatory of Uzbekistan
- Tashkent Pediatric Medical Institute
- Tashkent State Medicine Academy
- Tashkent State University of Oriental Studies
- Tashkent Islamic University
- British Management University in Tashkent
- Management Development Institute of Singapore in Tashkent
- Tashkent Institute of Textile and Light Industry
- Tashkent Institute of Railway Transport Engineers
- National Institute of Arts and Design named after Kamaleddin Bekhzod
- Inha University Tashkent
- Uzbekistan State University of World Languages
- Central Asian University
- Webster University in Tashkent
- Tashkent Professional College of Information Technologies
- Nordic International University

== Media ==
- Nine Uzbek language newspapers, four in English, and nine in Russian.
- Several television and cable television facilities, including Tashkent Tower, the second tallest structure in Central Asia.
- Moreover, Tashkent has digital broadcasting systems, which are unique in Central Asia.

== Transportation ==
The platform at Hamid Olimjon metro station

=== Metro ===
The Tashkent Metro was opened in 1977 and was the first metro system in Central Asia. It consists of four lines, with 50 stations in total. In 2025, the metro carried 286.8 million passengers. Each station is uniquely decorated, like an art exhibition, with elaborate mosaics, chandeliers, and historic or thematic designs.

=== Buses ===
As of 2022, Tashkent's city bus network comprised 141 routes and a rolling stock of 1,248 buses, made up of electric, gas, and conventionally powered units. The purchase of 1,000 CNG-powered buses was facilitated by a US$210 million line of credit provided to the National Bank of Uzbekistan by China.

Additionally, the city is serviced by 751 privately owned minibuses, or marshrutki, which run on 72 extra routes.

The city's trolleybus system was shut down in April 2010.

=== Air ===
Tashkent International Airport is the largest and busiest airport in the country and serves as a major regional hub in Central Asia, connecting the city to destinations across Asia, Europe, and North America. It was named after Islam Karimov, the first president of independent Uzbekistan, in 2017. The airport served 8.7 million passengers in 2024.

=== Rail ===
Tram transport in the city was discontinued on 1 May 2016, with the stated reason being to ease car congestion on the city's roads.

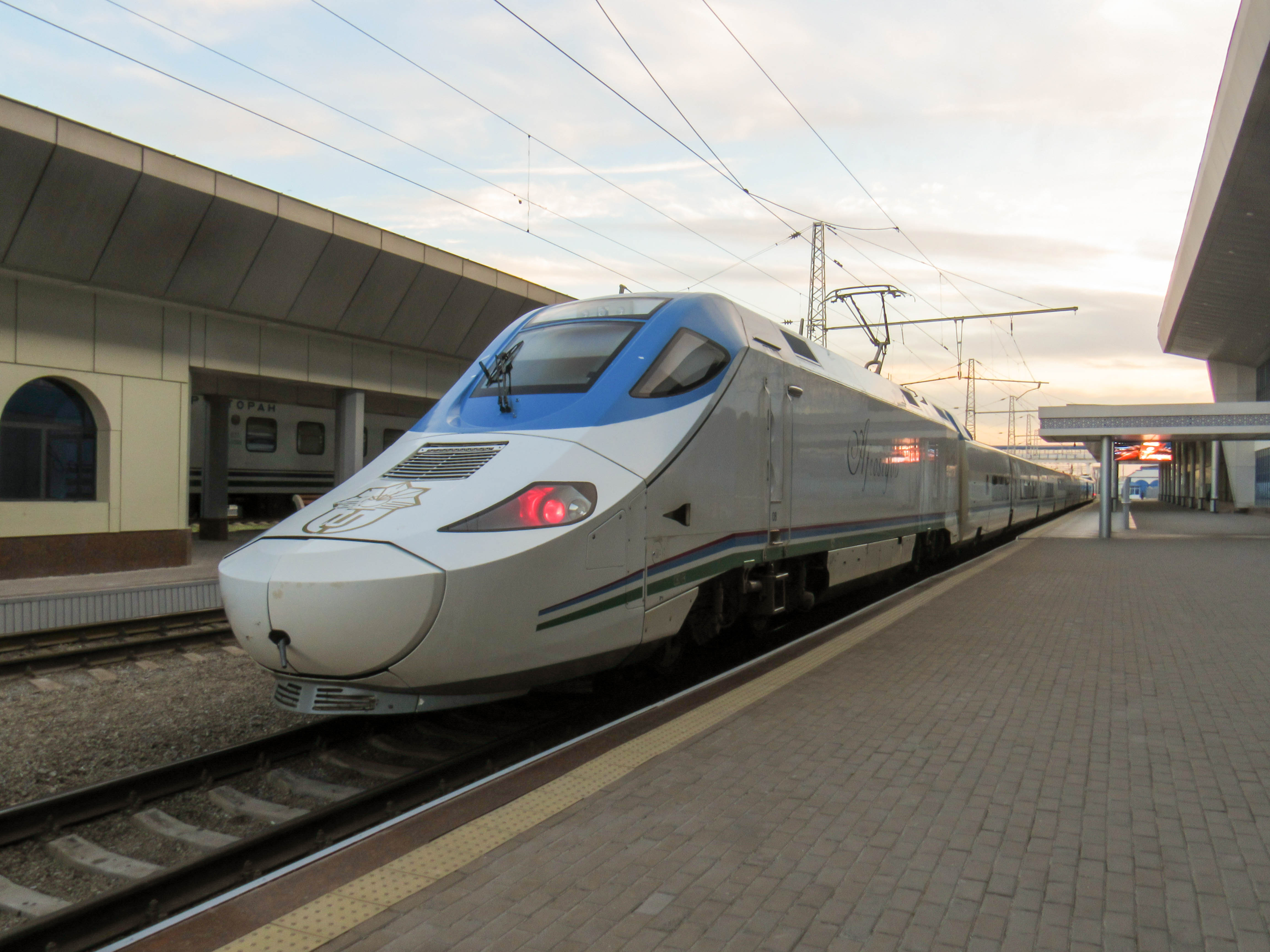
High-speed Afrosiyob train at Tashkent Central station

The Tashkent–Bukhara high-speed rail line is Uzbekistan's long-distance high-speed rail corridor, capable of covering the 600 km between the capital and Bukhara in under four hours, and reaching Samarkand in just over two hours. There is a lower-speed line which extends further, from Bukhara to Khiva. There are daily services in both directions along the route.

As of April 2026, there are also daily international services from Tashkent to Almaty, twice-weekly services to Volgograd and Moscow, and weekly services to Dushanbe and Kazan.

== Entertainment and shopping ==
There are several shopping malls in Tashkent. These include Tashkent City Mall, Next, and Samarqand Darvoza shopping malls. Most of the malls, including Riviera and Compass, were built and are operated by the Tower Management Group. This is part of the Orient Group of Companies.

The capital's most established theatre is the Alisher Navoi Theater, which has regular ballet and opera performances. Ilkhom Theater, founded by Mark Weil in 1976, was the first independent theatre in the Soviet Union. The theatre still operates in Tashkent and is known for its historical reputation.

== Sport ==
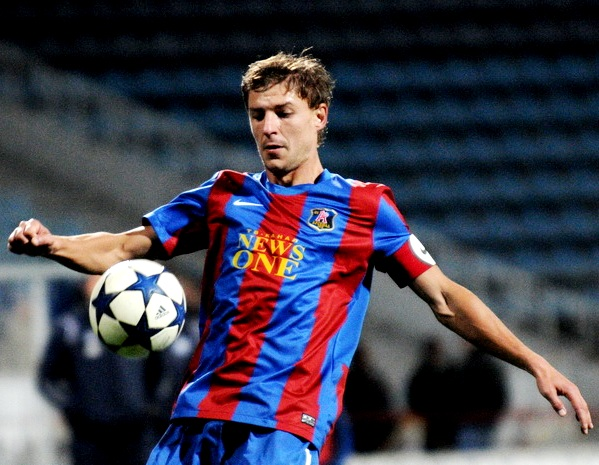
Maksim Shatskikh, a striker for the Uzbekistan national football team, is from Tashkent.

Football is the most popular sport in Tashkent, with the most prominent football clubs being Pakhtakor Tashkent FK, FC Bunyodkor, and PFC Lokomotiv Tashkent, all three of which compete in the Uzbekistan Super League. Footballers Maksim Shatskikh, Peter Odemwingie, and Vasilis Hatzipanagis were born in the city. Humo Tashkent, a professional ice hockey team, was established in 2019 with the aim of joining the Kontinental Hockey League (KHL), a top-level Eurasian league, in the future. Humo joined the second-tier Supreme Hockey League (VHL) for the 2019–20 season. Humo play their games at the Humo Ice Dome; both the team and the arena derive their name from the mythical Huma bird. Humo Tashkent was a member of the reformed Uzbekistan Ice Hockey League, which began play in February 2019. Humo finished in first place at the end of the regular season. Cyclist Djamolidine Abdoujaparov was born in the city, while tennis player Denis Istomin was raised there. Akgul Amanmuradova and Iroda Tulyaganova are notable female tennis players from Tashkent. Gymnasts Alina Kabaeva and Israeli Olympian Alexander Shatilov were also born in the city. Former world champion and Israeli Olympic bronze medallist in the K-1 500 m sprint canoe event, Michael Kolganov, was also born in Tashkent.

In weightlifting, Uzbekistan won the heavyweight class at both the Rio and Tokyo Olympic Games. Tashkent hosted the 2021 Weightlifting World Championships.

== Notable people ==
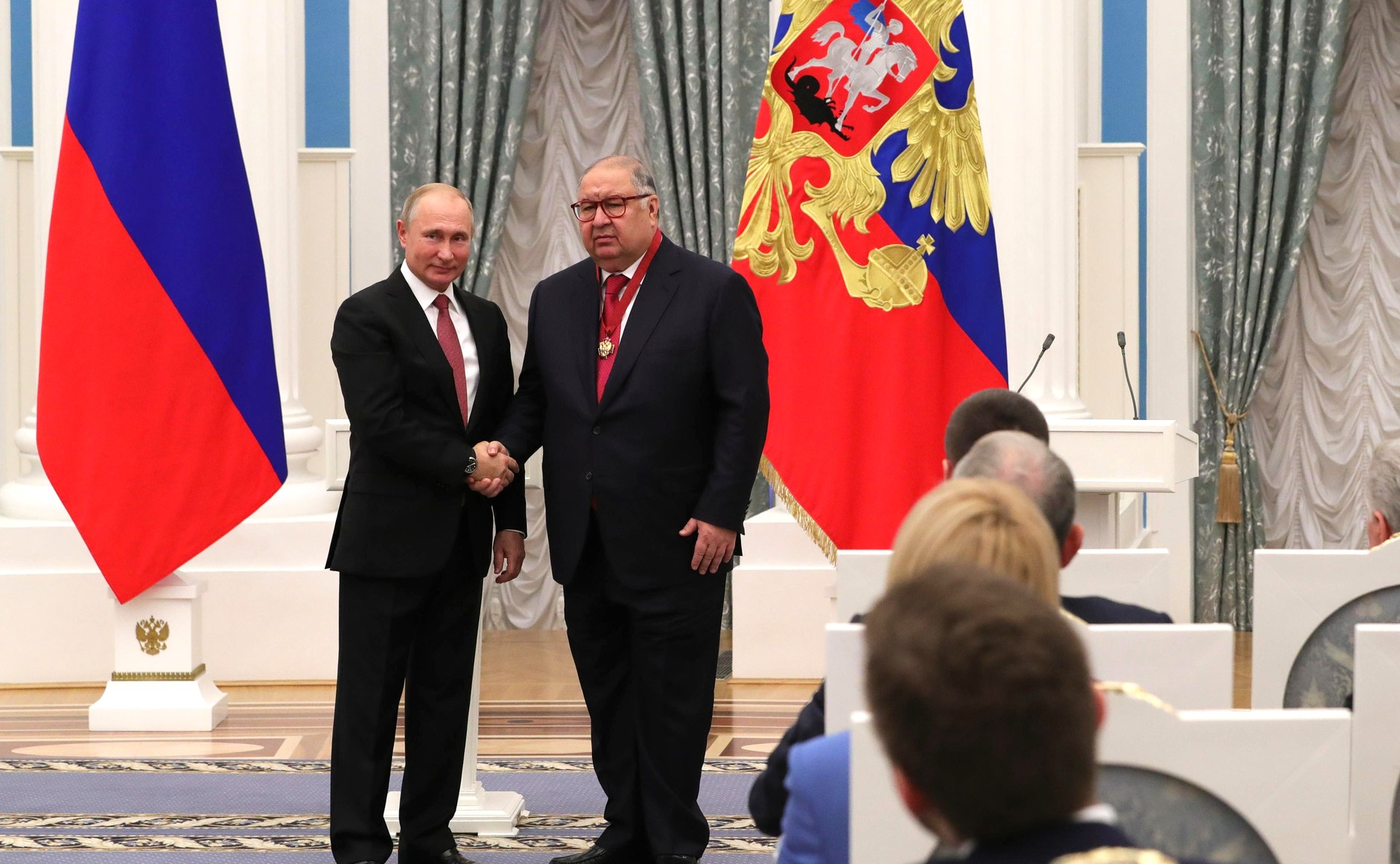
Alisher Usmanov with Vladimir Putin.

- Behzod Abduraimov, classical pianist
- Nodirbek Abdusattorov, chess grandmaster
- Turgun Alimatov, Uzbek classic music and shashmaqam player and composer
- Natasha Alam, Uzbekistani–American actress and model
- Abdulla Aripov, politician and Prime Minister of Uzbekistan
- Lola Astanova, Russian-American pianist
- Viktor Bryukhanov, director of Chernobyl Nuclear Power Plant
- Sogdiana Fedorinskaya, singer and actress
- Gʻafur Gʻulom, poet
- Anwar Hanbaba, Chinese Uzbek educator and politician
- Ravshan Irmatov, football referee
- Helena Kagan, Israeli physician
- Arthur Kaliyev, born in Tashkent raised in Staten Island, New York, American ice hockey player for the Los Angeles Kings of the NHL
- Rustam Kasimdzhanov, chess player, former FIDE World Champion
- Ruslan Salakhutdinov, a tatar AI researcher
- Javokhir Sindarov (born 2005), chess grandmaster
- Moshe Kaveh (born 1943), Israeli physicist and former President of Bar-Ilan University
- Vladimir Kozlov, Ukrainian-American professional wrestler
- Varvara Lepchenko, American professional tennis player
- Olena Lytovchenko, writer
- Naima Mahmudova Soviet Uzbek doctor and stateswoman (1928–2017)
- Tohir Malik, novelist
- Boris Mavashev, Israeli seismologist
- Alisher Mirzo, painter
- Eson Kandov, singer and musician
- Abdulla Qodiriy, writer
- Mirjalol Qosimov, former player and head coach of the Uzbekistan national football team
- Igor Povalyayev, former professional footballer
- Svetlana Radzivil, high jumper
- Artur Rozyyev, former Russian professional football player
- Dilorom Saidaminova, composer
- Tursunoy Saidazimova, singer
- Shakhida Shaimardanova, composer
- Iroda Tulyaganova, former tennis player
- Alisher Usmanov, born in Chust, spent his childhood in Tashkent
- Milana Vayntrub, American actress and comedian
- Rita Volk, Uzbekistani–American actress
- Hakim Karimovich Zaripov, circus performer
- Farrukh Zokirov, singer
- Zulfiya, writer and poet
- Sodiq Safoyev, first deputy chairperson of the Senate of Uzbekistan's Parliament
- Ali Hamroyev, actor, film director, screenwriter, and film producer
- Abid Sadykov, organic chemist, academician, and politician
- Behzod Hoshimov, academic
- Umid Iskandarov, Uzbek actor
- Ulugʻbek Qodirov, actor
- Tohir Sodiroqov, singer
- Alisher Uzoqov, actor
- Zafar Khashimov (born 1968), Uzbekistani businessman
- Abdukodir Khusanov, professional footballer
- Majid Qodiri (1886-1938), Scholar

== Twin towns – sister cities ==
Tashkent is twinned with:

- Ankara, Turkey
- Ashgabat, Turkmenistan
- Astana, Kazakhstan
- Berlin, Germany
- Bishkek, Kyrgyzstan
- Cairo, Egypt
- Dnipro, Ukraine
- Kyiv, Ukraine
- Moscow, Russia
- Nagoya, Japan
- Riga, Latvia
- Seattle, United States
- Seoul, South Korea
- Shanghai, China
- Sverdlovsk, Ukraine

== See also ==
- Gates of Tashkent
