= List of Tashkent Metro stations =

This is a list of Tashkent Metro stations, excluding abandoned, projected, planned stations, and those under construction.

== List of active stations ==
Line	English transcription	Transfer	Opened	Image
Chilonzor Line	Buyuk Ipak Yoli		18 August 1980	
Chilonzor Line	Pushkin		18 August 1980	
Chilonzor Line	Hamid Olimjon		18 August 1980	
Chilonzor Line	Amir Temur Xiyoboni	Yunus Rajabiy (Yunusobod Line)	6 November 1977	
Chilonzor Line	Mustaqilliq Maidoni		6 November 1977	
Chilonzor Line	Paxtakor	Alisher Navoiy (Oʻzbekiston Line)	6 November 1977	
Chilonzor Line	Xalqlar Doʻstligi		6 November 1977	
Chilonzor Line	Milliy Bog		6 November 1977	
Chilonzor Line	Novza		6 November 1977	
Chilonzor Line	Mirzo Ulugbek		6 November 1977	
Chilonzor Line	Chilonzor		6 November 1977	
Chilonzor Line	Olmazor		6 November 1977	
Chilonzor Line	Choshtepa		26 December 2020	
Chilonzor Line	Oʻzgarish		26 December 2020	
Chilonzor Line	Sirgʻali		26 December 2020	
Chilonzor Line	Yangihayot		26 December 2020	
Chilonzor Line	Chinor		26 December 2020	
Oʻzbekiston Line	Beruniy		30 April 1991	
Oʻzbekiston Line	Tinchlik		30 April 1991	
Oʻzbekiston Line	Chorsu		6 November 1989	
Oʻzbekiston Line	Gafur Gulom		6 November 1989	
Oʻzbekiston Line	Alisher Navoiy	Paxtakor (Chilonzor Line)	8 December 1984	
Oʻzbekiston Line	Ozbekiston		8 December 1984	
Oʻzbekiston Line	Kosmonavtlar		8 December 1984	
Oʻzbekiston Line	Oybek	Ming O‘rik (Yunusobod Line)	8 December 1984	
Oʻzbekiston Line	Toshkent		8 December 1984	
Oʻzbekiston Line	Mashinasozlar		6 November 1987	
Oʻzbekiston Line	Doʻstlik	Texnopark (Circle Line)	6 November 1987	
Yunusobod Line	Turkiston		29 August 2020	
Yunusobod Line	Yunusobod		29 August 2020	
Yunusobod Line	Shahriston		24 October 2001	
Yunusobod Line	Bodomzor		24 October 2001	
Yunusobod Line	Minor		24 October 2001	
Yunusobod Line	Abdulla Qodirii		24 October 2001	
Yunusobod Line	Yunus Rajabiy	Amir Temur Xiyoboni (Chilonzor Line)	24 October 2001	
Yunusobod Line	Ming O‘rik	Oybek (Oʻzbekiston Line)	24 October 2001	
Circle Line	Texnopark	Doʻstlik (Oʻzbekiston Line)	30 August 2020	
Circle Line	Yashnobod		30 August 2020	
Circle Line	Tuzel		30 August 2020	
Circle Line	Olmos		30 August 2020	
Circle Line	Rohat		30 August 2020	
Circle Line	Yangiobod		30 August 2020	
Circle Line	Qoʻyliq		30 August 2020	
Circle Line	Matonat		25 April 2023	
Circle Line	Qiyot		25 April 2023	
Circle Line	Tolariq		25 April 2023	
Circle Line	Xonobod		25 April 2023	
Circle Line	Quruvchilar		25 April 2023	
Circle Line	Turon		11 March 2024	
Circle Line	Qipchoq		11 March 2024	
