= Paxtakor (Tashkent Metro) =

Tashkent Metro Station

General information
- Location: Tashkent, Uzbekistan
- Coordinates: 41.321264°N 69.254325°E
- System: Tashkent Metro
- Platforms: island platform
- Tracks: 2

History
- Opened: 6 November 1977

Services
| Preceding station | Tashkent Metro | Following station |
|---|---|---|
| Mustaqilliq Maidoni towards Buyuk Ipak Yoli | Chilonzor Line | Xalqlar Doʻstligi towards Chinor |
| Gafur Gulom towards Beruniy | Oʻzbekiston Line transfer at Alisher Navoiy | Ozbekiston towards Doʻstlik |
Location

Paxtakor is a station of the Tashkent Metro on Chilonzor Line. The station column type with underground and ground-based lobby. The station was opened on 6 November 1977 as part of the inaugural section of Tashkent Metro, between October inkilobi and Sabir Rakhimov.
