= Yunus Rajabiy (Tashkent Metro) =

Tashkent Metro Station

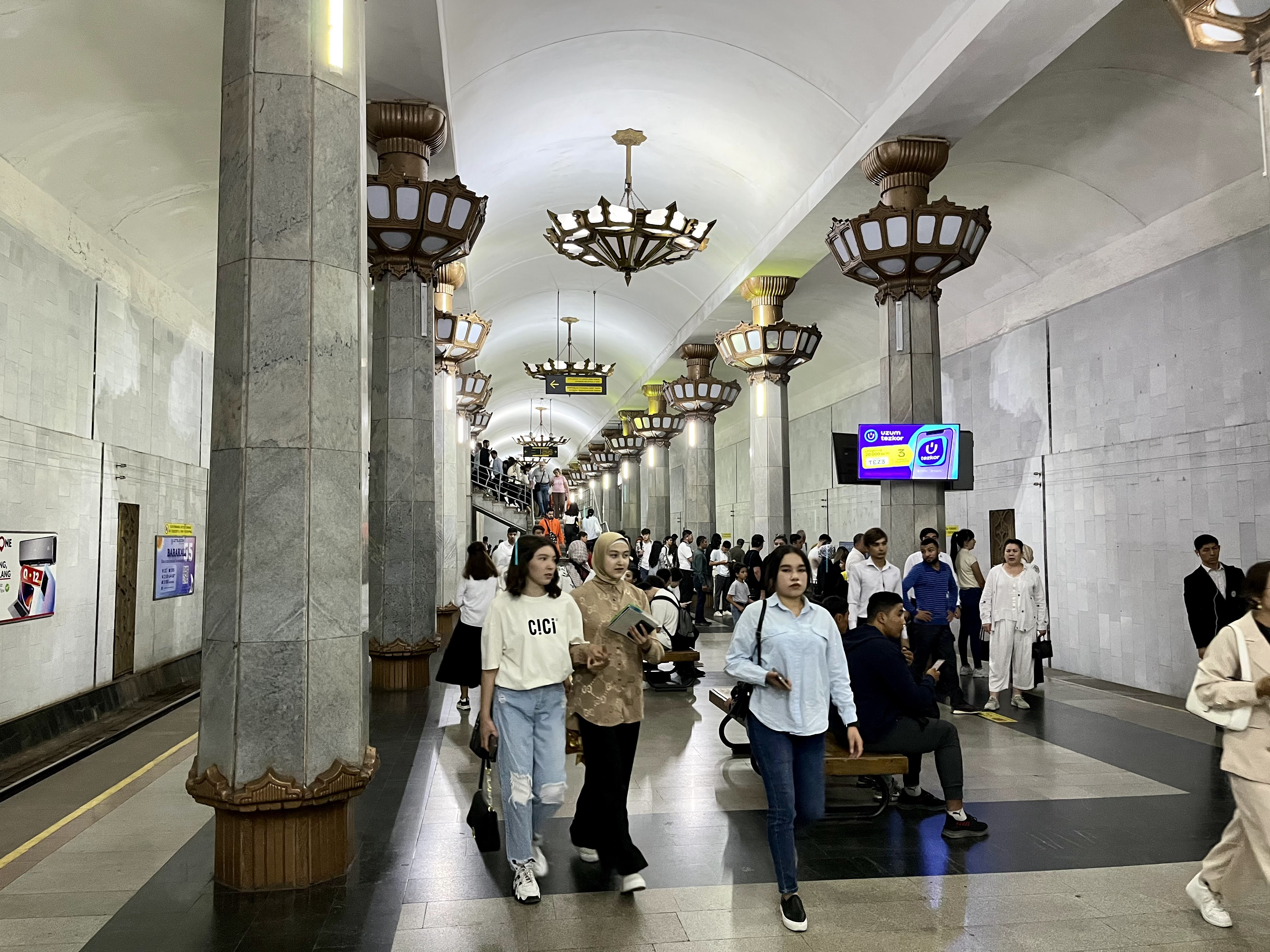

General information
- Location: Tashkent, Uzbekistan
- Coordinates: 41.312311°N 69.281042°E
- System: Tashkent Metro
- Platforms: island platform
- Tracks: 2

History
- Opened: 26 October 2001

Services
Preceding station	Tashkent Metro	Following station
Abdulla Qodirii towards Turkiston	Yunusobod Line	Ming O‘rik Terminus
Hamid Olimjon towards Buyuk Ipak Yoli	Chilonzor Line transfer at Amir Temur Xiyoboni	Mustaqilliq Maidoni towards Chinor
Location

Yunus Rajabiy is a station of the Tashkent Metro on Yunusobod Line. It was opened on 24 October 2001 as part of the inaugural section of the line, between Ming O‘rik and Habib Abdullayev. It is a transfer station to Amir Temur Xiyoboni, Chilonzor Line. The station is named after the celebrated Soviet and Uzbek composer Yunus Rajabiy.
