= Oybek (Tashkent Metro) =

Tashkent Metro Station

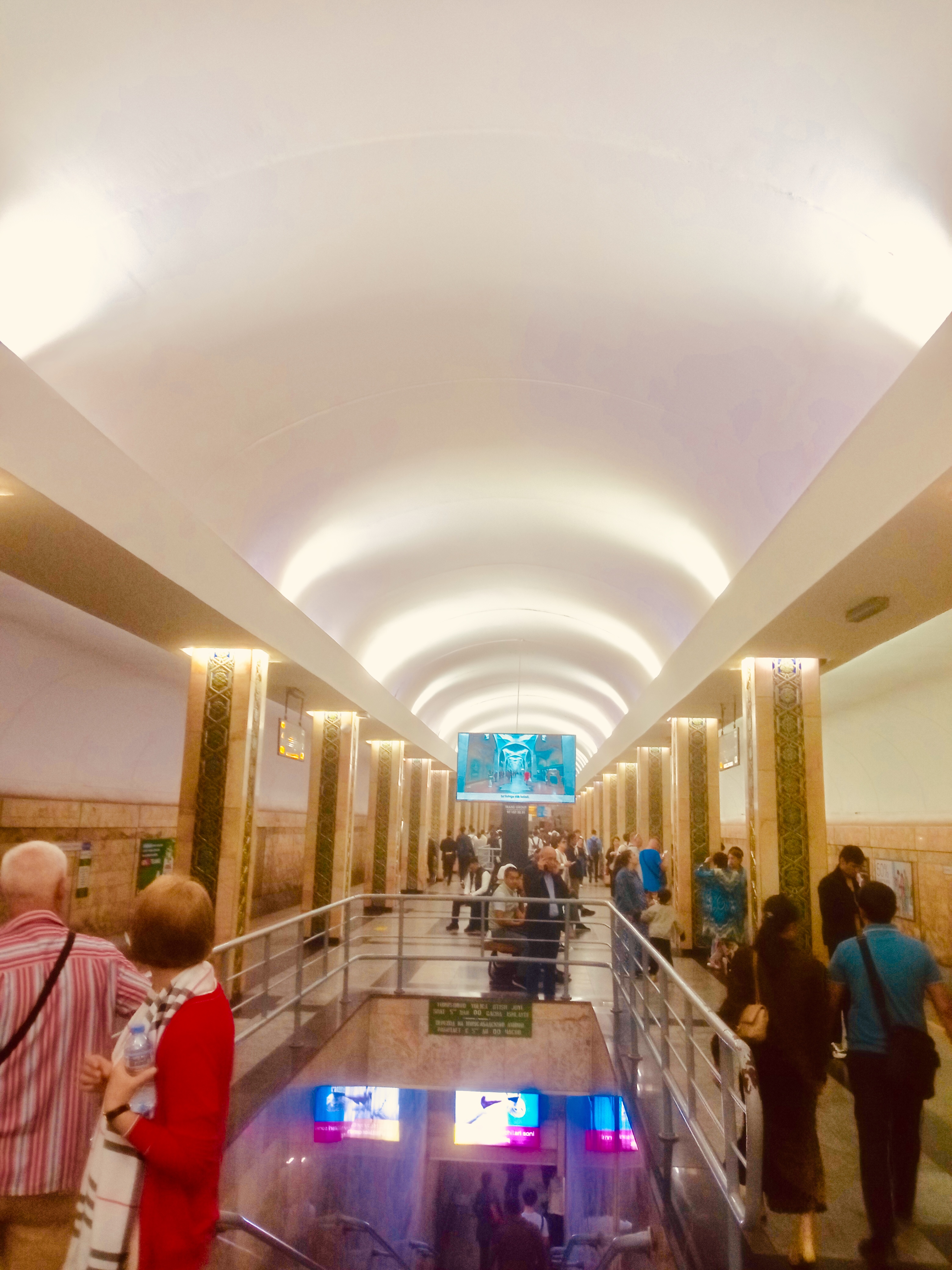

General information
- Location: Tashkent, Uzbekistan
- Coordinates: 41.298686°N 69.273333°E
- System: Tashkent Metro
- Platforms: island platform
- Tracks: 2

History
- Opened: 8 December 1984

Services
Preceding station	Tashkent Metro	Following station
Kosmonavtlar towards Beruniy	Oʻzbekiston Line	Toshkent towards Doʻstlik
Yunus Rajabiy towards Turkiston	Yunusobod Line transfer at Ming O‘rik	Terminus
Location

Oybek or Aybek is a station of the Tashkent Metro on Oʻzbekiston Line. The station opened on 8 December 1984 as part of the inaugural section of the line, between Alisher Navoiy and Toshkent. It is named in honor of the poet Musa Tashmukhamedov.
