= Alisher Navoiy (Tashkent Metro) =

Tashkent Metro Station

General information
- Location: Tashkent, Uzbekistan
- Coordinates: 41.321125°N 69.254714°E
- System: Tashkent Metro
- Platforms: island platform
- Tracks: 2

History
- Opened: 8 December 1984

Services
Preceding station	Tashkent Metro	Following station
Gafur Gulom towards Beruniy	Oʻzbekiston Line	Ozbekiston towards Doʻstlik
Mustaqilliq Maidoni towards Buyuk Ipak Yoli	Chilonzor Line transfer at Paxtakor	Bunyodkor towards Chinor
Location

Alisher Navoiy is a station of the Tashkent Metro on the Oʻzbekiston Line. The station opened on 8 December 1984 as the western terminus of the inaugural section of the line, between Alisher Navoiy and Toshkent. On 6 November 1989 the line was extended to Chorsu. It is named after Alisher Navoiy.
