= Tolariq (Tashkent Metro) =

Tashkent Metro Station

General information
- Location: Tashkent; Uzbekistan
- Coordinates: 41°14′40″N 69°17′59″E
- System: Tashkent Metro
- Tracks: 2

History
- Opened: 25 April 2023

Services
Preceding station	Tashkent Metro	Following station
Qiyot towards Texnopark	Circle Line	Xonobod towards Qipchoq
Location

Tolariq is a Tashkent Metro station on the Circle Line. It was opened on 25 April 2023 as part of the extension of the line between Qoʻyliq and Quruvchilar. The adjacent stations are Qiyot and Xonobod.

The original name of the station was 10-Bekat, which means "Station 10", and in August 2023 Tolariq, together with other stations of the line, was given a proper name.
