= Minor (Tashkent Metro) =

Tashkent Metro Station

General information
- Location: Tashkent, Uzbekistan
- Coordinates: 41.328094°N 69.283661°E
- System: Tashkent Metro
- Platforms: island platform
- Tracks: 2

History
- Opened: 26 October 2001

Services
Preceding station	Tashkent Metro	Following station
Bodomzor towards Turkiston	Yunusobod Line	Abdulla Qodirii towards Ming O‘rik
Location

Minor is a station of the Tashkent Metro on Yunusobod Line. It was opened on 24 October 2001 as part of the inaugural section of the line, between Ming O‘rik and Habib Abdullayev.

The station is decorated with columns made of red granite and located at the center of the platform. The walls are decorated with marble dark colors.
