= Chilonzor (Tashkent Metro) =

Tashkent Metro Station

General information
- Location: Tashkent, Uzbekistan
- Coordinates: 41.274547°N 69.204739°E
- System: Tashkent Metro
- Platforms: island platform
- Tracks: 2

History
- Opened: 6 November 1977

Services
Preceding station	Tashkent Metro	Following station
Mirzo Ulugbek towards Buyuk Ipak Yoli	Chilonzor Line	Olmazor towards Chinor
Location

Chilonzor is a station of the Tashkent Metro on Chilonzor Line. The station was opened on 6 November 1977 as part of the inaugural section of Tashkent Metro, between October inkilobi and Sabir Rakhimov.
