= Qiyot (Tashkent Metro) =

Tashkent Metro Station

General information
- Location: Tashkent; Uzbekistan
- Coordinates: 41°14′40″N 69°17′59″E
- System: Tashkent Metro
- Tracks: 2

History
- Opened: 25 April 2023

Services
Preceding station	Tashkent Metro	Following station
Matonat towards Texnopark	Circle Line	Tolariq towards Qipchoq
Location

Qiyot is a Tashkent Metro station on the Circle Line. It was opened on 25 April 2023 as part of the extension of the line between Qoʻyliq and Quruvchilar. The adjacent stations are Matonat and Tolariq.

The original name of the station was 9-Bekat, which means "Station 9", and in August 2023 Qiyot, together with other stations of the line, was given a proper name.
