= 1977 in rail transport =

This article lists events related to rail transport that occurred in 1977.

== Events ==
=== January events ===
- January 10 – Passenger service on Boston and Maine Railroad's Lexington Branch ends when a train consisting of a Budd Rail Diesel Car and a switcher locomotive are stranded by a snowstorm at the Bedford, Massachusetts depot.
- January 18 – The Granville railway disaster, Australia's worst ever, occurs at Granville, a suburb of Sydney, New South Wales, when a commuter train derails and hits a bridge, causing the bridge to collapse on top of the train.

=== February events ===
- February 4 – Chicago Loop derailment Chicago, Illinois, United States: A Chicago Transit Authority elevated train motorman disregards cab signals and rear ends another train at a curve on the Loop during the evening rush hour causing four cars of the rear train derail and fall to the street below. Eleven people are killed and over 180 injured in the worst disaster in the history of Chicago's rapid transit system. The motorman is suspected of being high on marijuana.

=== March events ===
- March 13 – The Shin-Nagata and Myodani route of the Seishin-Yamate Line opens, the first section of Kobe Municipal Subway in Hyogo Prefecture of Japan.
- March 28 – The United States Interstate Commerce Commission approves Chicago South Shore and South Bend Railroad's petition to end passenger service.

=== April events ===
- April 21 – Indiana Governor Otis R. Bowen signs into law an act forming the Northern Indiana Commuter Transportation District which will take over passenger service from the Chicago South Shore and South Bend Railroad.

=== May events ===
- May – Auto-Train Corporation launches a second Auto Train, this time between Louisville, Kentucky and Sanford, Florida.
- May 9 – The last Paris–Istanbul train with the name Orient Express makes its final run. The name persists as a train running from Paris to Vienna.
- May 21 – The Glasgow Subway shuts down for a complete system overhaul.
- May 23 – A train hijack takes place at the village of De Punt, in the province of Groningen in the Netherlands by activists aiming to endorse the Republic of South Maluku (Republik Maluku Selatan (RMS)), a self-proclaimed republic in the Maluku Islands. At the same time a hostage situation occurs at a school in Bovensmilde. The Dutch Marines storm the train on June 11, after six Starfighters fly over the train, creating a noise and distraction for the hostage takers. Six hostage takers and two passengers lose their lives in the operation. The activists at the school surrender after they learn of the fate of their fellow activists in the train.

=== June events ===
- June 16 – Construction begins on the Minsk Metro in Belarus (at this time part of the Soviet Union).
- June 30 – Last Railway post office to run on rails in the United States, New York–Washington, D.C.

=== September events ===
- September – The second Auto Train route to Louisville, Kentucky is discontinued due to heavy financial losses.

=== October events ===
- October 14 – First section of Amsterdam Metro opens.
- October 26 – Locomotive number 043 903 pulls the last regularly scheduled mainline train on German tracks to be hauled by a steam locomotive.
- October 29 – First run of the Maple Leaf train, operated by Amtrak and Via Rail Canada.

=== November events ===
- November 9 – The first section of the Tashkent Metro, the Chilonzor Line from Olmazor to Amir Temur Xiyoboni, officially begins regular operation in Uzbekistan (at this time part of the Soviet Union).

=== December events ===
- December 16 – London becomes the first capital city in the world to be directly linked to its international airport by underground railway as the Queen opens Heathrow Central tube station (later Heathrow Terminals 2 & 3 tube station) on London Underground's Piccadilly line at the centre of London Heathrow Airport.

=== Unknown date events ===
- W. Graham Claytor Jr. is succeeded by Stanley Crane as president of the Southern Railway (U.S.).
- Via Rail Canada takes over operations of the Super Continental passenger train from Canadian National.
