= Mirzo Ulugbek (Tashkent Metro) =

Tashkent Metro Station

General information
- Location: Tashkent, Uzbekistan
- Coordinates: 41.282081°N 69.212453°E
- System: Tashkent Metro
- Platforms: island platform
- Tracks: 2

History
- Opened: 6 November 1977
- Former names: 50 Let SSSR (1977–1992)

Services
Preceding station	Tashkent Metro	Following station
Novza towards Buyuk Ipak Yoli	Chilonzor Line	Chilonzor towards Chinor
Location

Mirzo Ulugbek (formerly 50 let SSSR; “50 years of the USSR” until 1992) is a station of the Tashkent Metro on Chilonzor Line. The station was opened on 6 November 1977 as part of the inaugural section of Tashkent Metro, between October inkilobi and Sabir Rakhimov.
