= 4-Bekat =

4-bekat, which literally means "Station 4", was a provisional name of two different stations of Tashkent Metro:

- Yangihayot, on Chilonzor Line;
- Olmos, on Circle Line/30th anniversary of the independence of Uzbekistan Line.
