= Matonat (Tashkent Metro) =

Tashkent Metro Station

General information
- Location: Tashkent; Uzbekistan
- Coordinates: 41°14′40″N 69°18′30″E
- System: Tashkent Metro
- Tracks: 2

History
- Opened: 25 April 2023

Services
Preceding station	Tashkent Metro	Following station
Qoʻyliq towards Texnopark	Circle Line	Qiyot towards Qipchoq
Location

Matonat is a Tashkent Metro station on the Circle Line. It was opened on 25 April 2023 as part of the extension of the line between Qoʻyliq and Quruvchilar. The adjacent stations are Qoʻyliq and Qiyot.

The original name of the station was 8-Bekat, which means "Station 8", and in August 2023 Matonat, together with other stations of the line, was given a proper name.
