= Abdulla Qodirii (Tashkent Metro) =

Tashkent Metro Station

General information
- Location: Tashkent, Uzbekistan
- Coordinates: 41.319411°N 69.282458°E
- System: Tashkent Metro
- Platforms: island platform
- Tracks: 2

History
- Opened: 26 October 2001

Services
Preceding station	Tashkent Metro	Following station
Minor towards Turkiston	Yunusobod Line	Yunus Rajabiy towards Ming O‘rik
Location

Abdulla Qodirii is a station of the Tashkent Metro on Yunusobod Line. It was opened on 24 October 2001 as part of the inaugural section of the line, between Ming O‘rik and Habib Abdullayev. It is named after Abdulla Qodiriy.
