= 1-Bekat =

1-bekat, which literally means "Station 1", was a provisional name of two different stations of Tashkent Metro:

- Choshtepa, on Chilonzor Line;
- Texnopark, on Circle Line/30th anniversary of the independence of Uzbekistan Line.
