= Pushkin (Tashkent Metro) =

Tashkent Metro Station

General information
- Location: Tashkent, Uzbekistan
- Coordinates: 41.321708°N 69.311244°E
- System: Tashkent Metro
- Platforms: island platform
- Tracks: 2

History
- Opened: 18 August 1980

Services
Preceding station	Tashkent Metro	Following station
Buyuk Ipak Yoli Terminus	Chilonzor Line	Hamid Olimjon towards Chinor
Location

Pushkin is a station of the Tashkent Metro on Chilonzor Line. This station is named after poet Alexander Pushkin. It was opened on 18 August 1980 as part of the second section of Chilonzor Line, between October inkilobi and Maksim Gor'kiy.
