= 3-Bekat =

3-bekat, which literally means "Station 3", was a provisional name of two different stations of Tashkent Metro:

- Sirgʻali, on Chilonzor Line;
- Tuzel, on Circle Line/30th anniversary of the independence of Uzbekistan Line.
