= Ozbekiston (Tashkent Metro) =

Tashkent Metro Station

Oʻzbekiston

General information
- Location: Tashkent, Uzbekistan
- Coordinates: 41.311397°N 69.253408°E
- System: Tashkent Metro
- Platforms: island platform
- Tracks: 2

History
- Opened: 8 December 1984

Services
Preceding station	Tashkent Metro	Following station
Alisher Navoiy towards Beruniy	Oʻzbekiston Line	Kosmonavtlar towards Doʻstlik
Location

Oʻzbekiston (English: Uzbekistan) is a station of the Tashkent Metro on Oʻzbekiston Line. It was opened on 8 December 1984 as part of the inaugural section of the line, between Alisher Navoiy and Toshkent. The station is one of the vaulted type with two underground vestibules. The station is located lamps, which are made of glass and metal in the form of a cotton boll to disclose. On the walls in the enameled ceramics shown for water, and the ceiling is decorated with ganch. At furnish used marble, granite, ceramics, ganch, metal, glass and other materials.
