= Oʻzgarish (Tashkent Metro) =

Tashkent Metro Station

General information
- Location: Tashkent, Uzbekistan
- Coordinates: 41.22727°N 69.20404°E
- System: Tashkent Metro

History
- Opened: 2020-26-12

Services
Preceding station	Tashkent Metro	Following station
Choshtepa towards Buyuk Ipak Yoli	Chilonzor Line	Sirgʻali towards Chinor
Location

Oʻzgarish is a station of the Tashkent Metro on Chilonzor Line. It was put into operation on December 26, 2020, as part of the third section of the Chilanzar line, between Olmazor and Chinor. The station is located between Choshtepa and Sirgʻali.

The planned name for the station was Toshkent halqa yo‘li (Tashkent Circle Road), however, the station was opened as 2-Bekat, which simply means Station-2. At the same time, there was another 2-Bekat station in Tashkent, which later became Yashnobod. In August 2023, this station was given the official name Oʻzgarish.
