= 2-Bekat =

2-bekat, which literally means "Station 2", was a provisional name of two different stations of Tashkent Metro:

- Oʻzgarish, on Chilonzor Line;
- Yashnobod, on Circle Line/30th anniversary of the independence of Uzbekistan Line.
