= Sirgʻali =

Tashkent Metro Station

General information
- Location: Tashkent, Uzbekistan
- Coordinates: 41.22065°N 69.20887°E
- System: Tashkent Metro

History
- Opened: 2020-26-12

Services
Preceding station	Tashkent Metro	Following station
Oʻzgarish towards Buyuk Ipak Yoli	Chilonzor Line	Yangihayot towards Chinor
Location

Sirgʻali is a station of the Tashkent Metro on Chilonzor Line. It was put into operation on December 26, 2020, as part of the third section of the Chilanzar line, between Olmazor and Chinor. The station is located between Oʻzgarish and Yangihayot.

The planned name for the station was Sirgʻali, which is the name of the city quarter close to the station, however, the station was opened as 3-Bekat, which simply means Station-3. At the same time, there was another 3-Bekat station in Tashkent, which later became Tuzel. In August 2023, this station was given the official name Sirgʻali.
