= Xonobod (Tashkent Metro) =

Tashkent Metro Station

General information
- Location: Tashkent; Uzbekistan
- Coordinates: 41°13′48″N 69°16′13″E
- System: Tashkent Metro
- Tracks: 2

History
- Opened: 25 April 2023

Services
Preceding station	Tashkent Metro	Following station
Tolariq towards Texnopark	Circle Line	Quruvchilar towards Qipchoq
Location

Xonobod is a Tashkent Metro station on the Circle Line. It was opened on 25 April 2023 as part of the extension of the line between Qoʻyliq and Quruvchilar. The adjacent stations are Tolariq and Quruvchilar.

The original name of the station was 11-Bekat, which means "Station 11", and in August 2023 Xonobod, together with other stations of the line, was given a proper name.
