= Milliy Bog (Tashkent Metro) =

Tashkent Metro Station

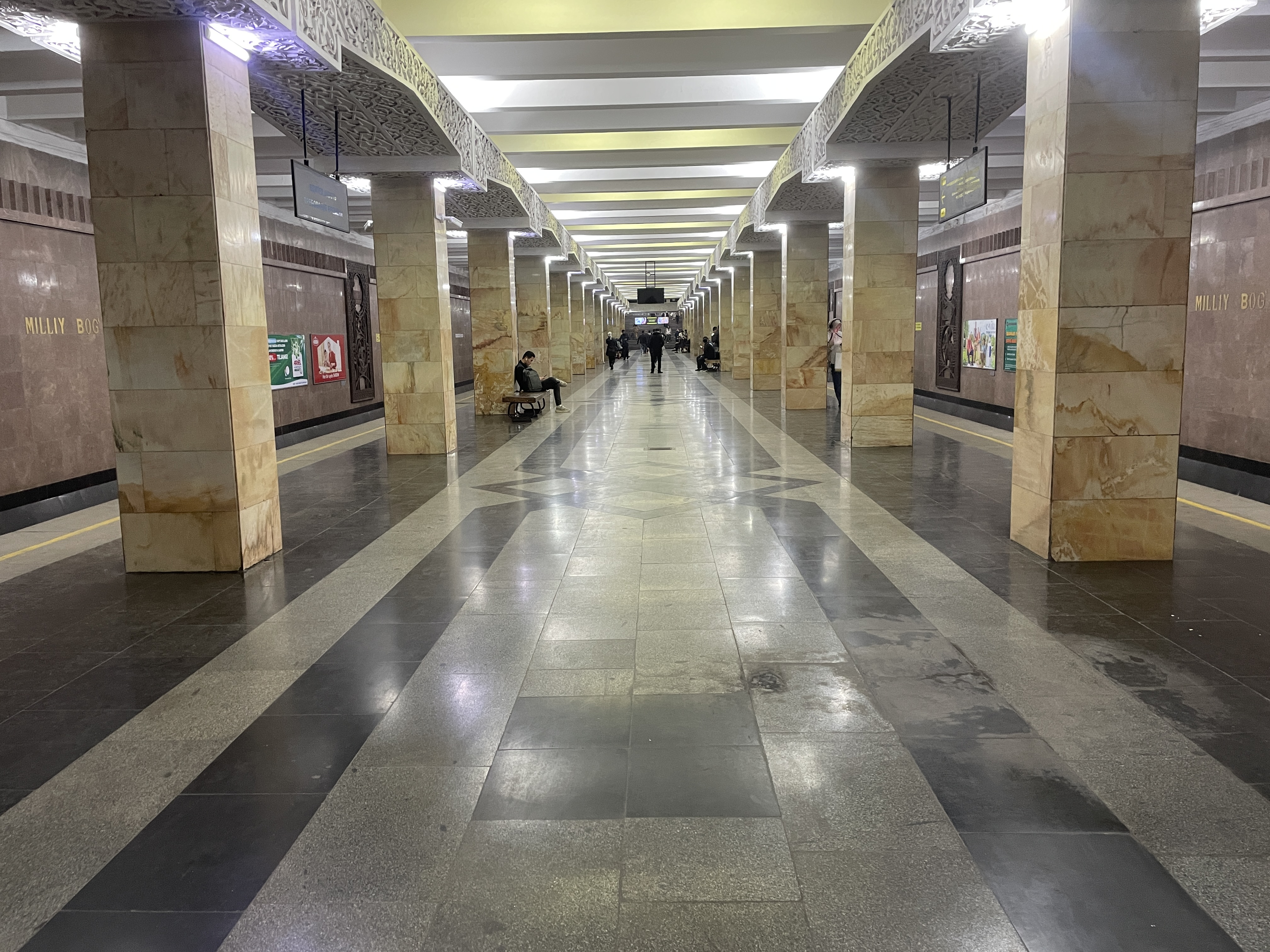

General information
- Location: Tashkent, Uzbekistan
- Coordinates: 41.304281°N 69.235414°E
- System: Tashkent Metro
- Platforms: island platform
- Tracks: 2

History
- Opened: 6 November 1977
- Former names: Yoshlik (1977–2006)

Services
Preceding station	Tashkent Metro	Following station
Xalqlar Doʻstligi towards Buyuk Ipak Yoli	Chilonzor Line	Novza towards Chinor
Location

Milliy Bog is a station of the Tashkent Metro on Chilonzor Line. The station was opened on 6 November 1977 as part of the inaugural section of Tashkent Metro, between October inkilobi and Sabir Rakhimov. Until 1 May 1992 the station was known as Komsomolskaya, and then until 10 October 2005 as Yoshlik.
