= Xalqlar Doʻstligi (Tashkent Metro) =

Tashkent Metro Station

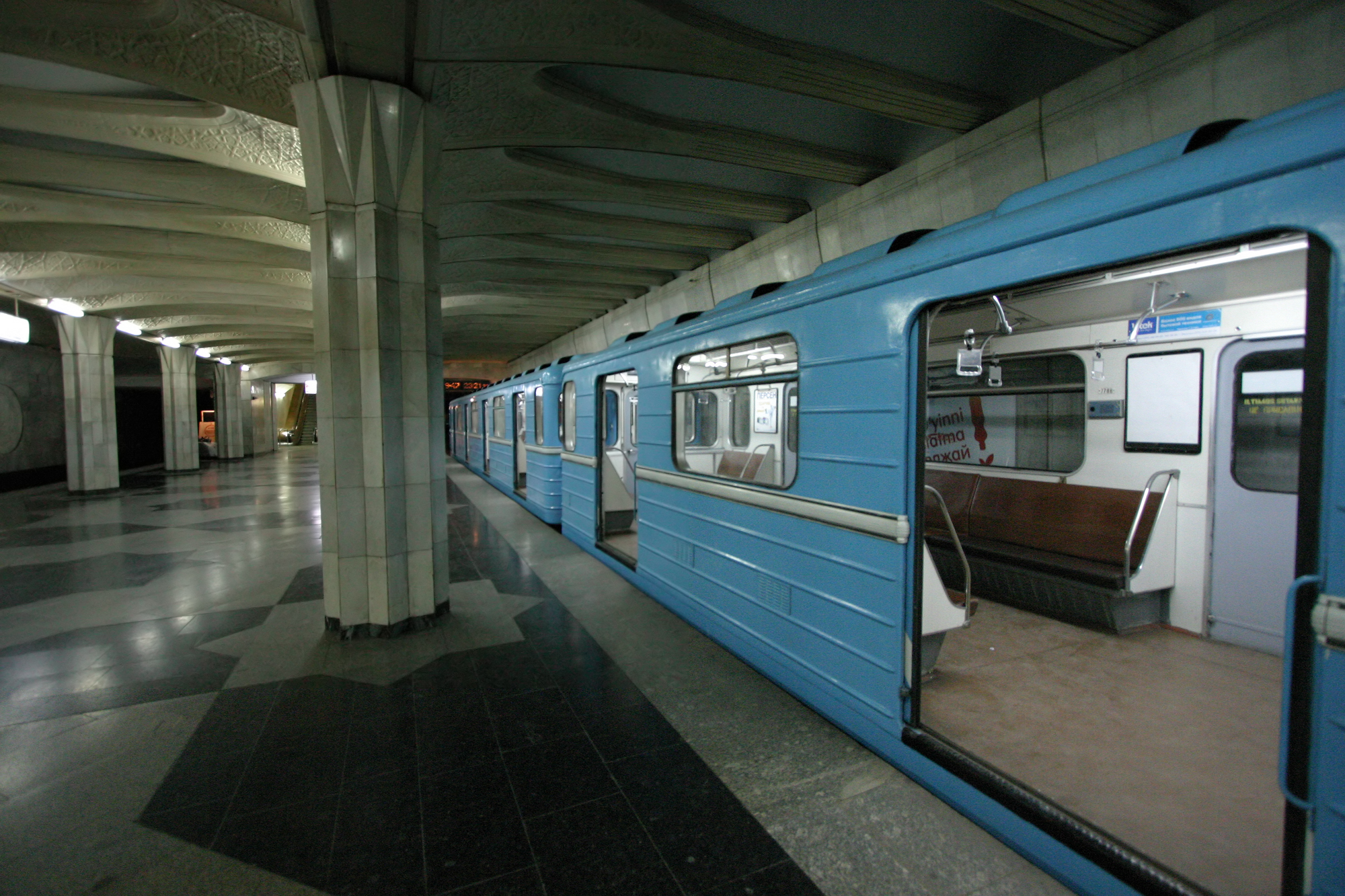

General information
- Location: Tashkent, Uzbekistan
- Coordinates: 41.311881°N 69.241392°E
- System: Tashkent Metro
- Platforms: island platform
- Tracks: 2

History
- Opened: 6 November 1977
- Former names: Xalqlar Doʻstligi (1977–2008)Bunyodkor (2008–2018)

Services
Preceding station	Tashkent Metro	Following station
Paxtakor towards Buyuk Ipak Yoli	Chilonzor Line	Milliy Bog towards Chinor
Location

Xalqlar Doʻstligi is a station of the Tashkent Metro on Chilonzor Line. The station was opened on 6 November 1977 as part of the inaugural section of Tashkent Metro, between October inkilobi and Sabir Rakhimov. The station is column type with underground and ground-based lobby.

== History ==
From the opening, the station was called Friendship of Peoples (Uzbek: Xalqlar Doʻstligi). On 6 August 2008, the Xalqlar Doʻstligi metro station was renamed into Bunyodkor. On 26 April 2018, at a video conference, the President of Uzbekistan Shavkat Mirziyoyev proposed to return the previous name. The Tashkent City Kengash of People's Deputies at the 36th session on 3 May 2018 approved the return of the name "Xalqlar Doʻstligi" to the Bunyodkor metro station.
