= Novza (Tashkent Metro) =

Tashkent Metro Station

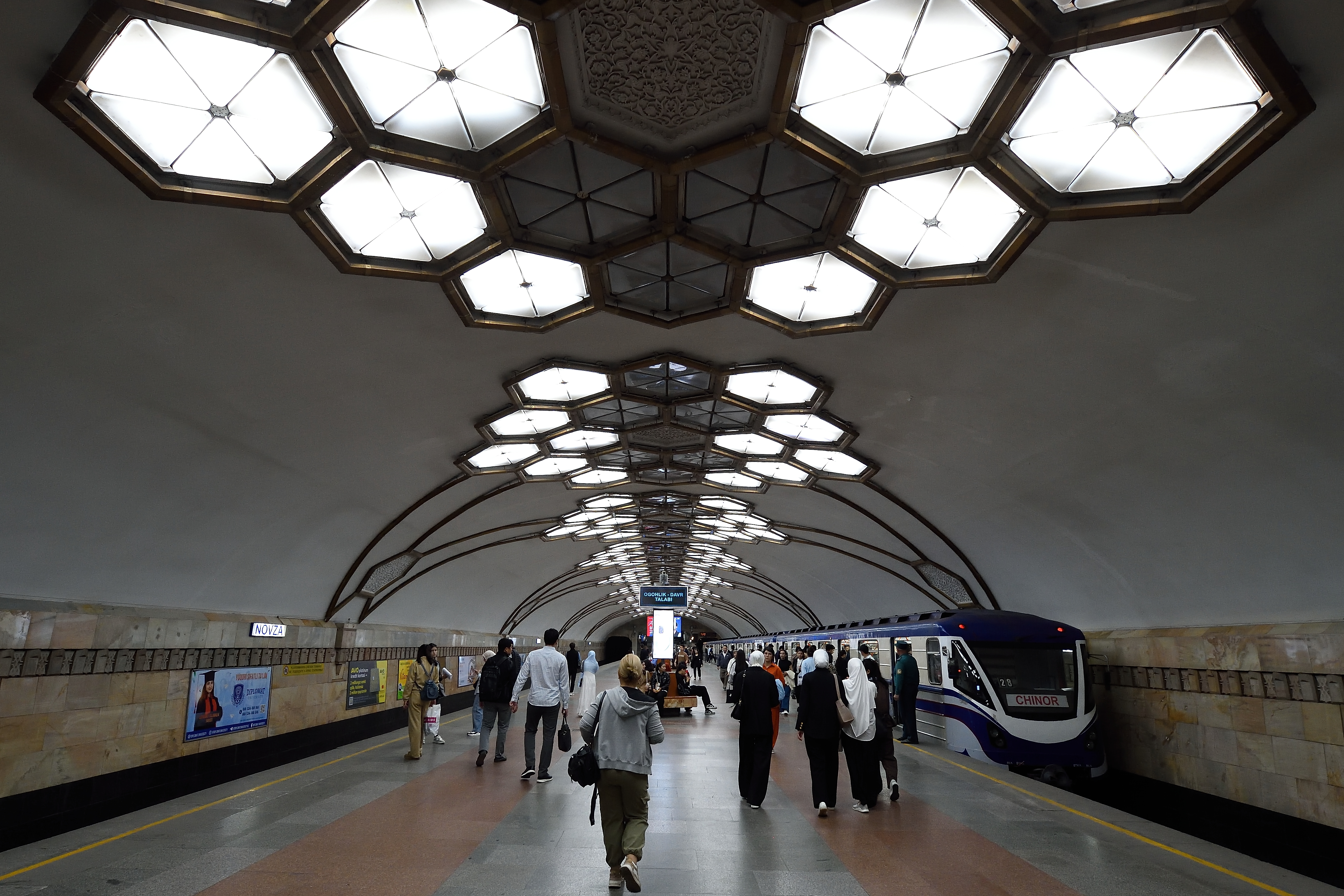

General information
- Location: Tashkent, Uzbekistan
- Coordinates: 41.292028°N 69.223342°E
- System: Tashkent Metro
- Platforms: island platform
- Tracks: 2

History
- Opened: 6 November 1977

Services
Preceding station	Tashkent Metro	Following station
Milliy Bog towards Buyuk Ipak Yoli	Chilonzor Line	Mirzo Ulugbek towards Chinor
Location

Novza is a station of the Tashkent Metro on Chilonzor Line. The station was opened on 6 November 1977 as part of the inaugural section of Tashkent Metro, between October inkilobi and Sabir Rakhimov. Previously it was called Hamza (Uzbek: Hamza, Ҳамза). June 16, 2015 was renamed the station "Novza" according to the decision of hakim (mayor) Tashkent.
