= Kosmonavtlar (Tashkent Metro) =

Tashkent Metro Station

General information
- Location: Tashkent, Uzbekistan
- Coordinates: 41.305022°N 69.265344°E
- System: Tashkent Metro
- Platforms: island platform
- Tracks: 2

History
- Opened: 8 December 1984
- Former names: Kosmonavtlar Prospekti

Services
Preceding station	Tashkent Metro	Following station
Ozbekiston towards Beruniy	Oʻzbekiston Line	Oybek towards Doʻstlik

UNESCO World Heritage Site
- Official name: Kosmonavtlar Metro Station (Cosmonauts Avenue Metro Station)
- Part of: Tashkent Modernist Architecture. Modernity and Tradition in Central Asia
- Criteria: Cultural: iv
- Reference: 1766
- Inscription: 2026 (48th Session)
Location

Kosmonavtlar (lit. 'Cosmonauts', formerly known as Проспект Космонавтов, Prospekt Kosmonavtov) is a space-programme-themed station of the Tashkent Metro. It honours Soviet cosmonauts such as Yuri Gagarin and Valentina Tereshkova, the first man and woman in space. The station was opened on 8 December 1984 as part of the inaugural section of the line, between Alisher Navoiy and Toshkent.

Until 2018 it was illegal to photograph the Tashkent metro, because it also worked as a nuclear bomb shelter.

In July 2026, the Kosmonavtlar station, along with nine other modernist sites in Tashkent, was designated by UNESCO as a World Heritage Site.

== Design ==
The station's architectural design was jointly developed in 1981–1982 by Sergo Sutyagin and Sergey Sokolov. The station was constructed between 1982 and 1984, with an architectural and decorative programme conceived as a tribute to space exploration.

The interior combines brightly coloured anodized aluminium, graduated blue ceramic surfaces and illuminated glass-clad columns, creating an impression of weightlessness. A continuous composition extending along the platform walls incorporates twelve circular ceramic medallions portraying figures associated with astronomy and spaceflight, including Ulugh Beg, Galileo Galilei, Icarus, Sergei Korolev, Yuri Gagarin, Valentina Tereshkova, Vladislav Volkov and Vladimir Dzhanibekov, together with images of Sputnik and other spacecraft.

Above the platform, linear lighting and inset glass stars transform the ceiling into a stylized representation of the Milky Way, reinforcing the station's cosmic atmosphere.
