= List of metro systems in the Soviet Union =

This is a list of metro systems which were built under the Soviet Union and continue operating in the post-Soviet states.

There were 13 metro systems in 7 of the 15 Soviet republics just before the dissolution of the Soviet Union in 1991. A 14th metro system, the Dnipro Metro, started construction in 1982, but due to financial difficulties was not opened until 1995. Other than in Dnipro, the only metro systems built in the post-Soviet states after 1991 are Kazan Metro in Russia (2005), Almaty Metro in Kazakhstan (2011) and Astana Light Metro in Kazakhstan (2026).

Additionally the Volgograd Metrotram, the Kryvyi Rih Metrotram and the Kyiv Pravoberezhna line are three 'metrotram' systems with elements of rapid transit, opened in 1984, 1986 and 1978 respectively. The latter one – being the oldest – is regarded to be the archetype of the other two systems.

== List ==
| City | Republic | Name | Year opened | Year of last expansion | Stations | Lines | System length | Ridership (millions) |
|---|---|---|---|---|---|---|---|---|
| Moscow | Russian SFSR | Moscow Metro | 1935 | 2025 | 311 | 16 | 541.9 km (336.7 mi) | 2378.3 (2016) |
| Leningrad (Now Saint Petersburg) | Russian SFSR | Leningrad Metro | 1955 | 2025 | 75 | 6 | 131.3 km (81.6 mi) | 740.4 (2016) |
| Kiev | Ukrainian SSR | Kiev Metro | 1960 | 2013 | 52 | 3 | 67.6 km (42.0 mi) | 484.6 (2016) (Note: Відправлення (перевезення) вантажів за видами транспорту (in Ukrainian). Kyiv.ukrstat.gov.ua. Retrieved on 1 October 2015.) |
| Tbilisi | Georgian SSR | Tbilisi Metro | 1966 | 2017 | 23 | 2 | 28.6 km (17.8 mi) | 138.8 (2019) |
| Baku | Azerbaijan SSR | Baku Metro | 1967 | 2022 | 27 | 3 | 40.7 km (25.3 mi) | 217.5 (2016) |
| Kharkiv | Ukrainian SSR | Kharkiv Metro | 1975 | 2016 | 30 | 3 | 38.1 km (23.7 mi) | 231.1 (2016) (Note: Пасажирські перевезення (щомісячна інформація). Kh.ukrstat.gov.ua. Retrieved on 23 September 2015.) |
| Tashkent | Uzbek SSR | Tashkent Metro | 1977 | 2023 (Note: The Yunusobod Line was opened in 2001.) | 50 | 4 | 71 km (44 mi) | 286.8 (2025) |
| Yerevan | Armenian SSR | Yerevan Metro | 1981 | 1996 | 10 | 1 | 13.4 km (8.3 mi) | 15.4 (2016) |
| Minsk | Byelorussian SSR | Minsk Metro | 1984 | 2024 | 36 | 3 | 44.89 km (27.89 mi) | 291.0 (2016) |
| Gorky (Now Nizhny Novgorod) | Russian SFSR | Gorky Metro | 1985 | 2018 | 16 | 2 | 21.4 km (13.3 mi) | 30.4 (2016) |
| Novosibirsk | Russian SFSR | Novosibirsk Metro | 1986 | 2025 | 13 | 2 | 15.9 km (9.9 mi) | 79.0 (2016) |
| Kuybyshev (Now Samara) | Russian SFSR | Kuybyshev Metro | 1987 | 2015 | 10 | 1 | 11.6 km (7.2 mi) | 15.6 (2016) |
| Sverdlovsk (Now Yekaterinburg) | Russian SFSR | Sverdlovsk Metro | 1991 | 2012 | 9 | 1 | 12.7 km (7.9 mi) | 49.2 (2016) |
