= Tinchlik (Tashkent Metro) =

Tashkent Metro Station

General information
- Location: Tashkent, Uzbekistan
- Coordinates: 41.331861°N 69.219925°E
- System: Tashkent Metro
- Platforms: island platform
- Tracks: 2

History
- Opened: 30 April 1991

Services
Preceding station	Tashkent Metro	Following station
Beruniy Terminus	Oʻzbekiston Line	Chorsu towards Doʻstlik
Location

Tinchlik is a station of the Tashkent Metro on Oʻzbekiston Line. The station was opened on 30 April 1991 as part of the extension of the line from Chorsu to Beruniy.
