= Tuzel (Tashkent Metro) =

Tashkent Metro Station

General information
- Location: Tashkent; Uzbekistan
- Coordinates: 41°17′31.4″N 69°21′22.2″E
- System: Tashkent Metro
- Tracks: 2

History
- Opened: 30 August 2020

Services
Preceding station	Tashkent Metro	Following station
Yashnobod towards Texnopark	Circle Line	Olmos towards Qipchoq
Location

Tuzel is a Tashkent Metro station on Circle Line. It was opened on 30 August 2020 as part of the inaugural section of the line between Texnopark and Qoʻyliq. The station is located between Yashnobod and Olmos.

Until August 2023, this station did not have an official name; the temporary name was 3-Bekat, which means "Station 3". At the same time, there was another 3-Bekat station in Tashkent, which later became Sirgʻali.
