= Gafur Gulom (Tashkent Metro) =

Tashkent Metro Station

Gʻafur Gʻulom

General information
- Location: Tashkent, Uzbekistan
- Coordinates: 41.327831°N 69.246981°E
- System: Tashkent Metro
- Platforms: island platform
- Tracks: 2

History
- Opened: 1989-11-04

Services
Preceding station	Tashkent Metro	Following station
Chorsu towards Beruniy	Oʻzbekiston Line	Alisher Navoiy towards Doʻstlik
Location

Gʻafur Gʻulom is a station of the Tashkent Metro on Oʻzbekiston Line. The station was opened on 6 November 1989 as part of the extension of the line between Alisher Navoiy and Chorsu. It is named after Gafur Gulom, an Uzbek poet, writer and translator. The station was decorated by artist S. Sultonmuradov. To finish the station used marble, granite, metal, glass, composition of artistic ceramics. Columns supporting a set of stations have many faces, the upper part of the column is thickened. Illuminating station lights hidden in the domes.
