= Bodomzor (Tashkent Metro) =

Rapid transit station of Tashkent, Uzbekistan

General information
- Location: Tashkent, Uzbekistan
- Coordinates: 41.3462°N 69.28595°E
- System: Tashkent Metro
- Platforms: island platform
- Tracks: 2

History
- Opened: 26 October 2001

Services
Preceding station	Tashkent Metro	Following station
Shahriston towards Turkiston	Yunusobod Line	Minor towards Ming O‘rik
Location

Bodomzor is a station of the Tashkent Metro on Yunusobod Line. It was opened on 24 October 2001 as part of the inaugural section of the line, between Ming O‘rik and Habib Abdullayev.

== Gallery ==
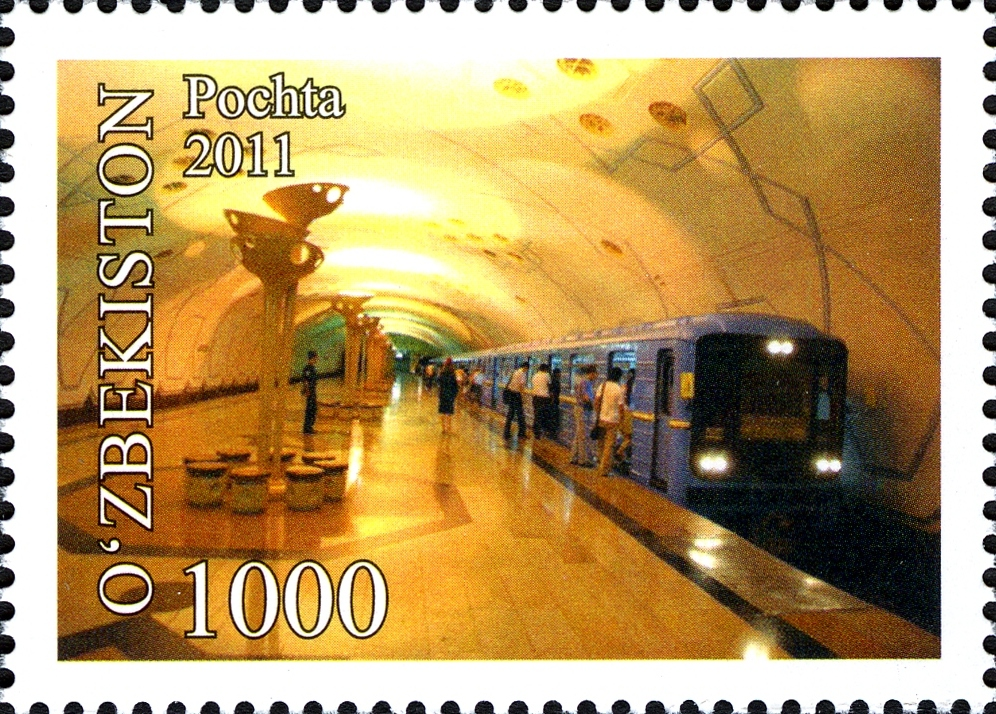
Bodomzor station on a 2011 stamp of Uzbekistan
