= Hamid Olimjon (Tashkent Metro) =

Tashkent Metro Station

- Platforms at Hamid Olimjon station

General information
- Location: Tashkent, Uzbekistan
- Coordinates: 41.317769°N 69.294878°E
- System: Tashkent Metro
- Platforms: island platform
- Tracks: 2

History
- Opened: 18 August 1980

Services
Preceding station	Tashkent Metro	Following station
Pushkin towards Buyuk Ipak Yoli	Chilonzor Line	Amir Temur Xiyoboni towards Chinor
Location

Hamid Olimjon is a station of the Tashkent Metro on Chilonzor Line. This station is named after poet Hamid Olimjon. The station vault type with two underground vestibules. It was opened on 18 August 1980 as part of the second section of Chilonzor Line, between October inkilobi and Maksim Gor'kiy.

On the station platform 9 luminaire made of white marble and glazes are mounted (painter I. Lipen).
