= Choshtepa (Tashkent Metro) =

Tashkent Metro Station

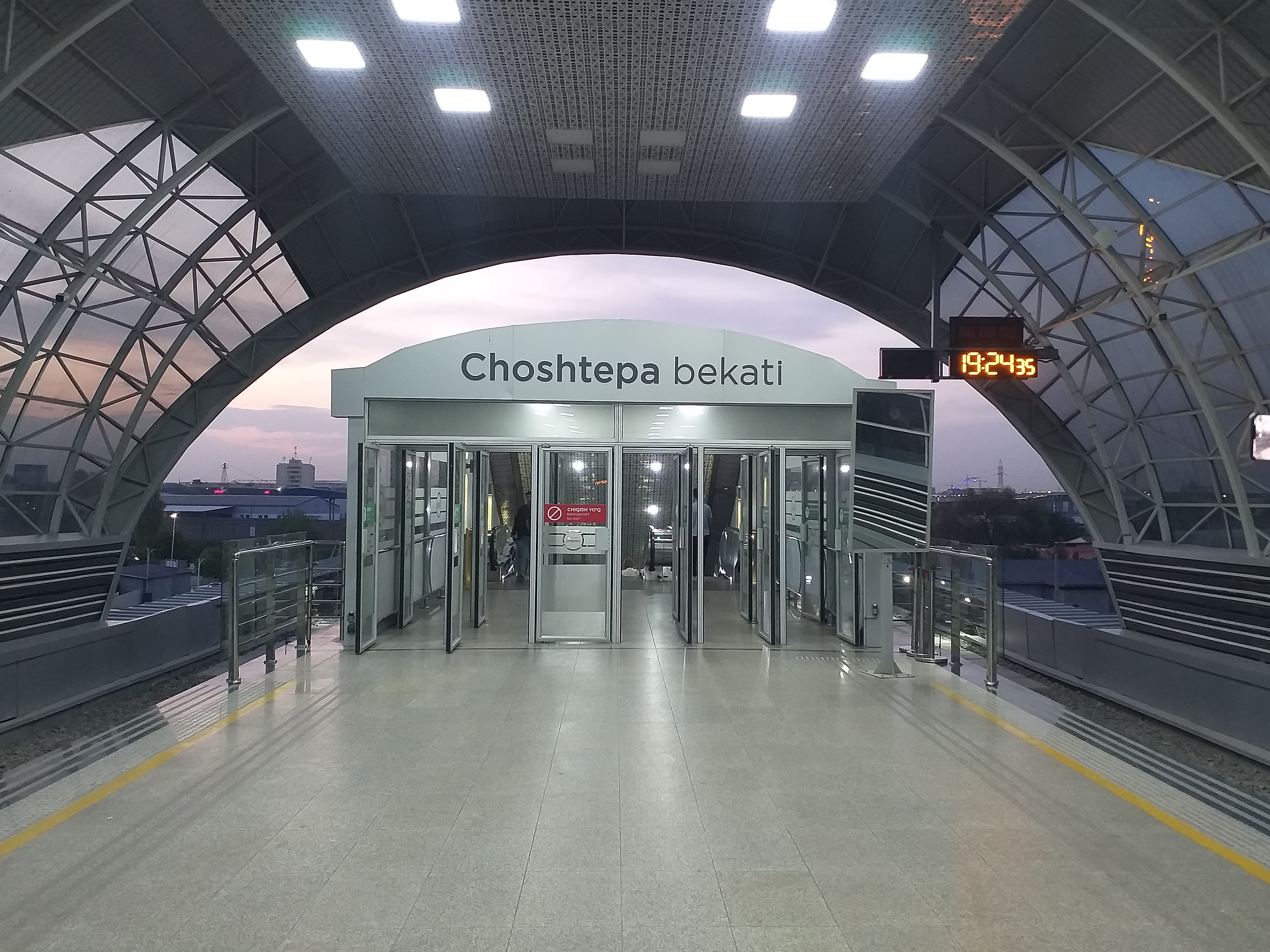

General information
- Location: Tashkent, Uzbekistan
- Coordinates: 41.23805°N 69.19623°E
- System: Tashkent Metro
- Platforms: Insular
- Tracks: 1

History
- Opened: 2020-26-12

Services
Preceding station	Tashkent Metro	Following station
Olmazor towards Buyuk Ipak Yoli	Chilonzor Line	Oʻzgarish towards Chinor
Location

Choshtepa is a station of the Tashkent Metro on the Chilonzor Line. It was put into operation on December 26, 2020, as part of the third section of the Chilanzar line, between Olmazor and Chinor. The station is located between Olmazor and Oʻzgarish.

The planned name for the station was Choshtepa, however, the station was opened as 1-Bekat, which simply means Station-1. At the same time, there was another 1-Bekat station in Tashkent, which later became Texnopark. In August 2023, this station was given the official name Choshtepa.
