= Olmos (Tashkent Metro) =

Tashkent Metro Station

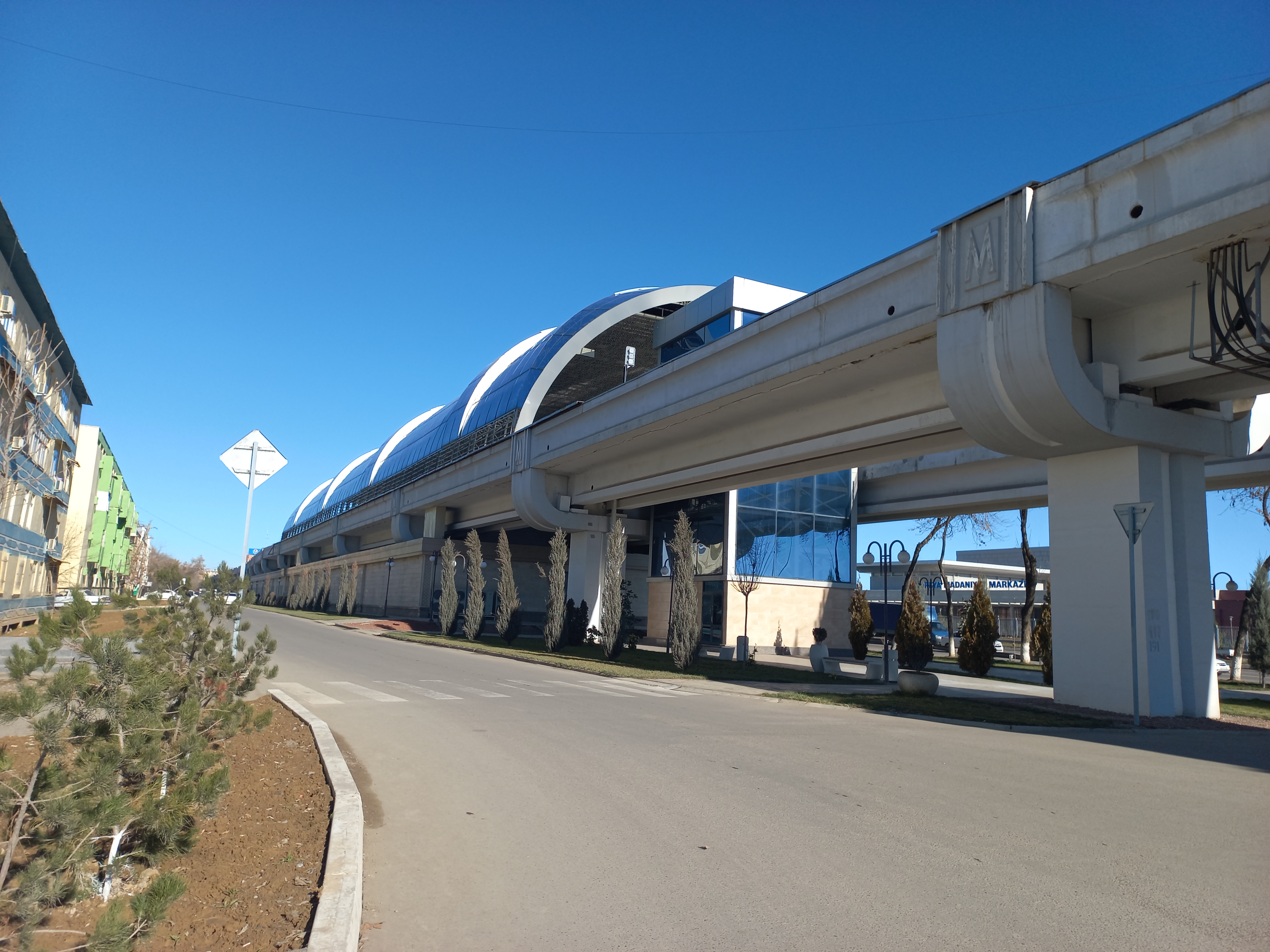

General information
- Location: Tashkent; Uzbekistan
- Coordinates: 41°16′55.1″N 69°21′37.1″E
- System: Tashkent Metro
- Tracks: 2

History
- Opened: 30 August 2020

Services
Preceding station	Tashkent Metro	Following station
Tuzel towards Texnopark	Circle Line	Rohat towards Qipchoq
Location

Olmos is a Tashkent Metro station on Circle Line. It was opened on 30 August 2020 as part of the inaugural section of the line between Texnopark and Qoʻyliq. The station is located between Tuzel and Rohat.

Until August 2023, this station did not have an official name; the temporary name was 4-Bekat, which means "Station 4". At the same time, there was another 4-Bekat station in Tashkent, which later became Yangihayot.
