= Yangihayot (Tashkent Metro) =

Tashkent Metro Station

- Station hall

General information
- Location: Tashkent, Uzbekistan
- Coordinates: 41.21269°N 69.21467°E
- System: Tashkent Metro

History
- Opened: 2020-26-12

Services
Preceding station	Tashkent Metro	Following station
Sirgʻali towards Buyuk Ipak Yoli	Chilonzor Line	Chinor Terminus
Location

Yangihayot is a station of the Tashkent Metro on Chilonzor Line. It was put into operation on December 26, 2020, as part of the third section of the Chilanzar line, between Olmazor and Chinor. The station is located between Sirgʻali and Chinor.

The planned name for the station was Afrosiyob, however, the station was opened as 4-Bekat, which simply means Station-4. At the same time, there was another 4-Bekat station in Tashkent, which later became Olmos. In August 2023, this station was given the official name Yangihayot.
