= Turon (Tashkent Metro) =

Tashkent Metro Station

General information
- Location: Tashkent; Uzbekistan
- Coordinates: 41°12′39″N 69°14′03″E
- System: Tashkent Metro
- Tracks: 2

History
- Opened: 11 March 2024

Services
Preceding station	Tashkent Metro	Following station
Quruvchilar towards Texnopark	Circle Line	Qipchoq Terminus
Location

Turon is a Tashkent Metro station on the Circle Line. It was opened on 11 March 2024 as part of the extension of the line between Quruvchilar and Qipchoq. The adjacent stations are Quruvchilar and Qipchoq.
