= Yunusobod (Tashkent Metro) =

Tashkent Metro Station

General information
- Location: Tashkent; Uzbekistan
- Coordinates: 41°21′59.9″N 69°17′31.6″E
- System: Tashkent Metro
- Platforms: island platform
- Tracks: 2

History
- Opened: 29 August 2020

Services
| Preceding station | Tashkent Metro | Following station |
|---|---|---|
| Turkiston Terminus | Yunusobod Line | Shahriston towards Ming O‘rik |
Location

Yunusobod is a Tashkent Metro station on Yunusobod line. It was opened on 29 August 2020 together with Turkiston. The station is located between Shahriston and Turkiston stations.

The construction of the station started in 2016. On 16 June 2020, Uzbek Railways, which owns Tashkent Metro, reported that the construction has been completed. The station is located in Yunusobod district of Tashkent and is expected to considerably aid with the passenger traffic situation in the city.
