= Mashinasozlar (Tashkent Metro) =

Tashkent Metro Station

General information
- Location: Tashkent, Uzbekistan
- Coordinates: 41.299439°N 69.303947°E
- System: Tashkent Metro
- Platforms: island platform
- Tracks: 2

History
- Opened: 7 November 1987
- Former names: Tashselmash

Services
Preceding station	Tashkent Metro	Following station
Toshkent towards Beruniy	Oʻzbekiston Line	Do‘stlik towards Doʻstlik
Location

Mashinasozlar is a station of the Tashkent Metro on Oʻzbekiston Line. The station was opened on 6 November 1987 as part of the extension of the line from Toshkent to Chkalov. Architectural and artistic design of the station is made columns and precast concrete structures. Columns and ceiling of the hall are decorated with reddish-green marble Syon-Shusha. Floors platform halls, vestibules and underground passages are covered with granite.

The station was previously known as Tashselmash.
