= Chorsu (Tashkent Metro) =

Metro station in Tashkent, Uzbekistan

General information
- Location: Tashkent, Uzbekistan
- Coordinates: 41.325239°N 69.232064°E
- System: Tashkent Metro
- Platforms: island platform
- Tracks: 2

History
- Opened: 4 November 1989

Services
Preceding station	Tashkent Metro	Following station
Tinchlik towards Beruniy	Oʻzbekiston Line	Gafur Gulom towards Doʻstlik
Location

Chorsu is a station of the Tashkent Metro on Oʻzbekiston Line. The station was opened on 6 November 1989 as part of the extension of the line between Alisher Navoiy and Chorsu Bazaar. On 30 April 1991 the line was extended to Beruniy.
