= Yunus Rajabiy =

Uzbek composer and academic (1897–1976)

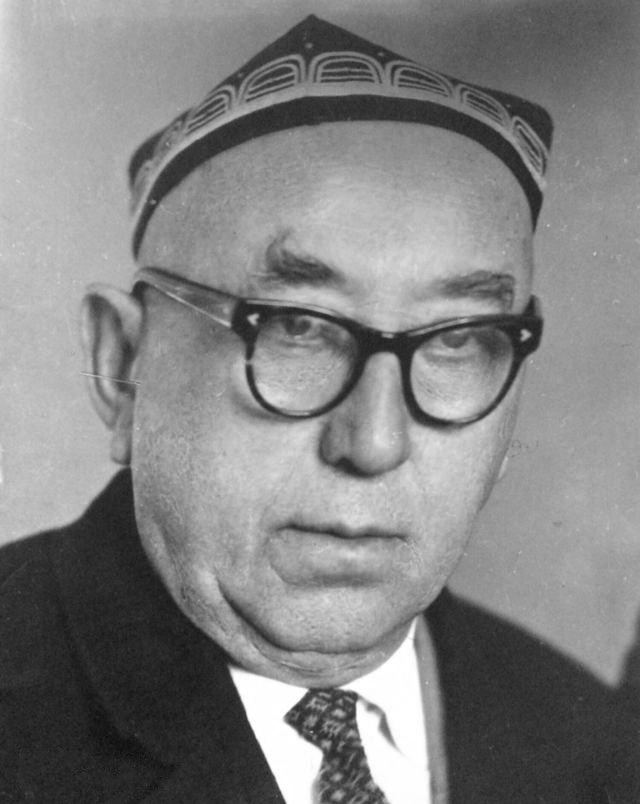
- Born: 5 January 1897; Tashkent
- Died: 23 April 1976 (aged 79); Tashkent
- Known for: contributions to Uzbek music
- Awards: Order of Lenin (1959); State Hamza Prize (1971); Order of Outstanding Merit (2000)

Yunus Rajabiy (Note: Uzbek: Yunus Rajabiy, Юнус Ражабий; Russian: Юнус Раджаби, romanized: Yunus Radjabi / Yunus Radzhabi.) (5 January 1897 – 23 April 1976) was a Soviet-Uzbek composer, instrumentalist, folklorist, academic, and leader of Uzbek music groups. In addition to composing much celebrated music, he systematically collected, documented, and recorded many Uzbek songs, preserving songs from collective memory.

Rajabiy received many awards for his work including the Soviet Order of Lenin, the title People's Artist of the Uzbek SSR, and the Order of Outstanding Merit of Uzbekistan. Several locations in Uzbekistan bear his name, including a station on the Tashkent Metro. In 1997, on the occasion of his 100th birthday, the Yunus Rajabiy Museum was inaugurated in Tashkent.

== Awards ==
- Honored Worker of Culture the Uzbek SSR (1939)
- People's Artist of the Uzbek SSR (7 May 1953)
- Order of Lenin (18 March 1959)
- Two Order of the Red Banner of Labour (26 August 1967, ?)
- Two Order of the Badge of Honour (25 December 1944, 16 January 1950)
- State Hamza Prize (1971)
- Order of Outstanding Merit (25 August 2000)
