= Yunus Rajabiy Museum =

Museum in Uzbekistan

Coordinates: 41.30506°N 69.26070°E

Yunus Rajabiy Museum is a museum in Uzbekistan dedicated to the life and work of national artist and composer Yunus Rajabiy. It is situated in Yakkasaray district in Tashkent.

== Description ==
The museum was established by his son Hasan Rajabiy in December 1997, on the eve of the 100th anniversary of Yunus Rajabiy's birth. On the first floor of the museum there is a memorial and instrument exposition room and a hotel. In the memorial room, Yunus Rajabiy's furniture, radio, outerwear, musical instrument, sheet music, pen, and tea cups are placed on his table. This museum is one of the most famous house-museums in Tashkent, it is well organized, serves a large number of visitors, and conducts tours.
