= Mustaqilliq Maidoni (Tashkent Metro) =

Tashkent Metro Station

Mustaqillik Maydoni

General information
- Location: Tashkent, Uzbekistan
- Coordinates: 41.318925°N 69.271292°E
- System: Tashkent Metro
- Platforms: island platform
- Tracks: 2

History
- Opened: 6 November 1977
- Former names: Lenin Maidoni (Ploshchad Lenina)

Services
Preceding station	Tashkent Metro	Following station
Amir Temur Xiyoboni towards Buyuk Ipak Yoli	Chilonzor Line	Paxtakor towards Chinor
Location

Mustaqillik Maydoni is a station of the Tashkent Metro on Chilonzor Line. The station was opened on 6 November 1977 as part of the inaugural section of Tashkent Metro, between October inkilobi and Sabir Rakhimov. Prior to 1 November 1991 the name of the station was "V. I. Lenin Maidoni" ( "Vladimir Lenin Square").
