= Ming Oʻrik station =

Tashkent Metro Station

Ming Oʻrik
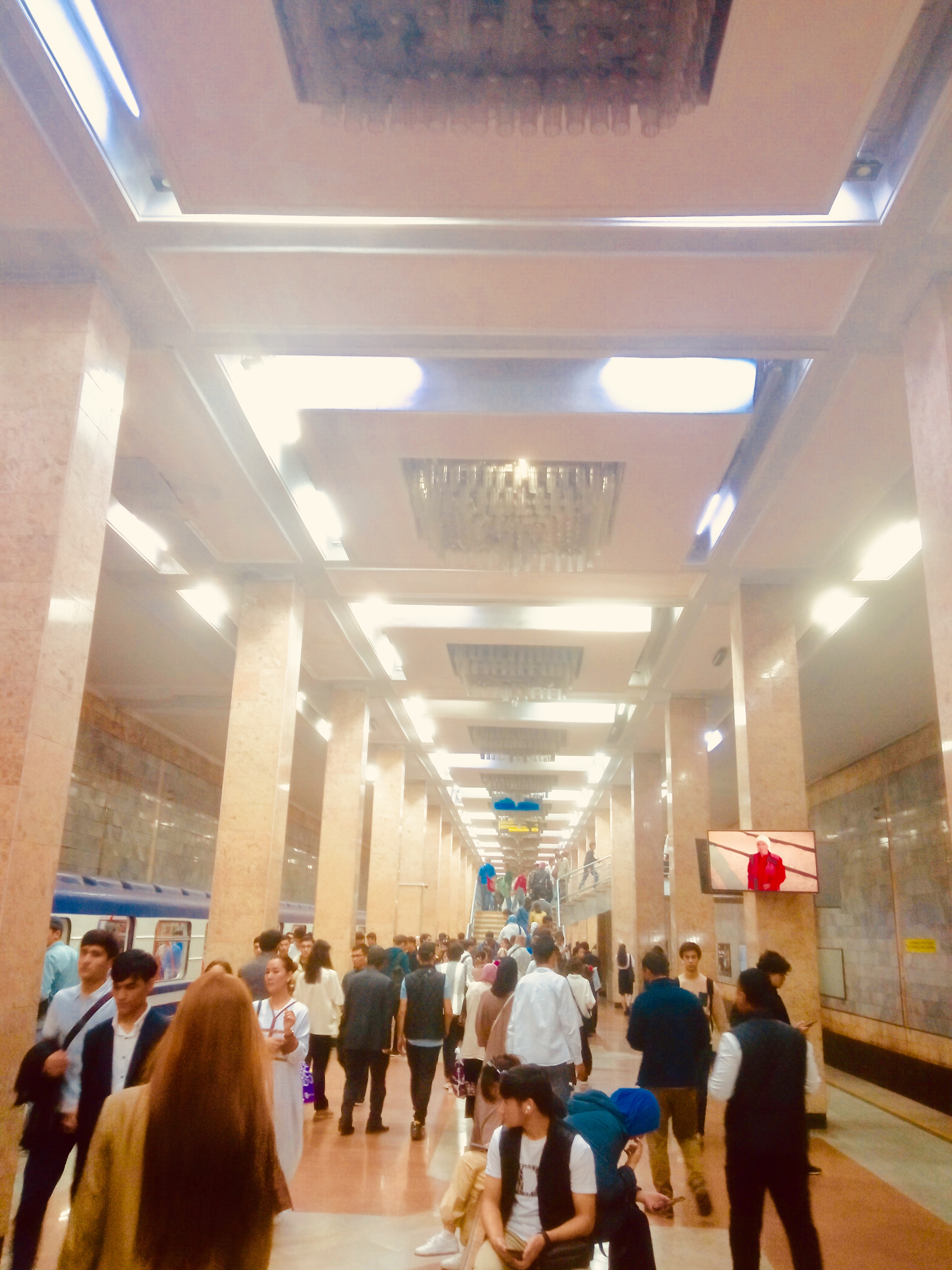

General information
- Location: Tashkent, Uzbekistan
- Coordinates: 41.298992°N 69.273019°E
- System: Tashkent Metro
- Platforms: island platform
- Tracks: 2

History
- Opened: 26 October 2001

Services
Preceding station	Tashkent Metro	Following station
Yunus Rajabiy towards Turkiston	Yunusobod Line	Terminus
Kosmonavtlar towards Beruniy	Oʻzbekiston Line transfer at Oybek	Toshkent towards Doʻstlik
Location

Ming Oʻrik is a station of the Tashkent Metro on Yunusobod Line. It was opened on 24 October 2001 as part of the inaugural section of the line, between Ming Orik and Habib Abdullayev. There is transfer to Oybek station of the Oʻzbekiston Line.
