= Quruvchilar (Tashkent Metro) =

Tashkent Metro Station

General information
- Location: Tashkent; Uzbekistan
- Coordinates: 41°13′17″N 69°15′35″E
- System: Tashkent Metro
- Tracks: 2

History
- Opened: 25 April 2023

Services
Preceding station	Tashkent Metro	Following station
Xonobod towards Texnopark	Circle Line	Turon towards Qipchoq
Location

Quruvchilar is a Tashkent Metro station on the Circle Line. It was opened on 25 April 2023 as part of the extension of the line between Qoʻyliq and Quruvchilar. The adjacent stations are Xonobod and Turon. On 11 March 2024, the line was extended to Qipchoq, and Quruvchilar ceased to be the terminus.

The original name of the station was 12-Bekat, which means "Station 12", and in August 2023 Quruvchilar, together with other stations of the line, was given a proper name.
