= Toshkent (Tashkent Metro) =

Tashkent Metro Station

General information
- Location: Tashkent, Uzbekistan
- Coordinates: 41.292136°N 69.28615°E
- System: Tashkent Metro
- Platforms: island platform
- Tracks: 2

History
- Opened: 8 December 1984

Services
Preceding station	Tashkent Metro	Following station
Oybek towards Beruniy	Oʻzbekiston Line	Mashinasozlar towards Doʻstlik
Location

Toshkent is a station of the Tashkent Metro on Oʻzbekiston Line. The station was opened on 8 December 1984 as the eastern terminus of the inaugural section of the line, between Alisher Navoiy and Toshkent. On 6 November 1987 the line was extended to Chkalov. It serves Tashkent's main-line railway station.
