= Shahriston (Tashkent Metro) =

Tashkent Metro Station

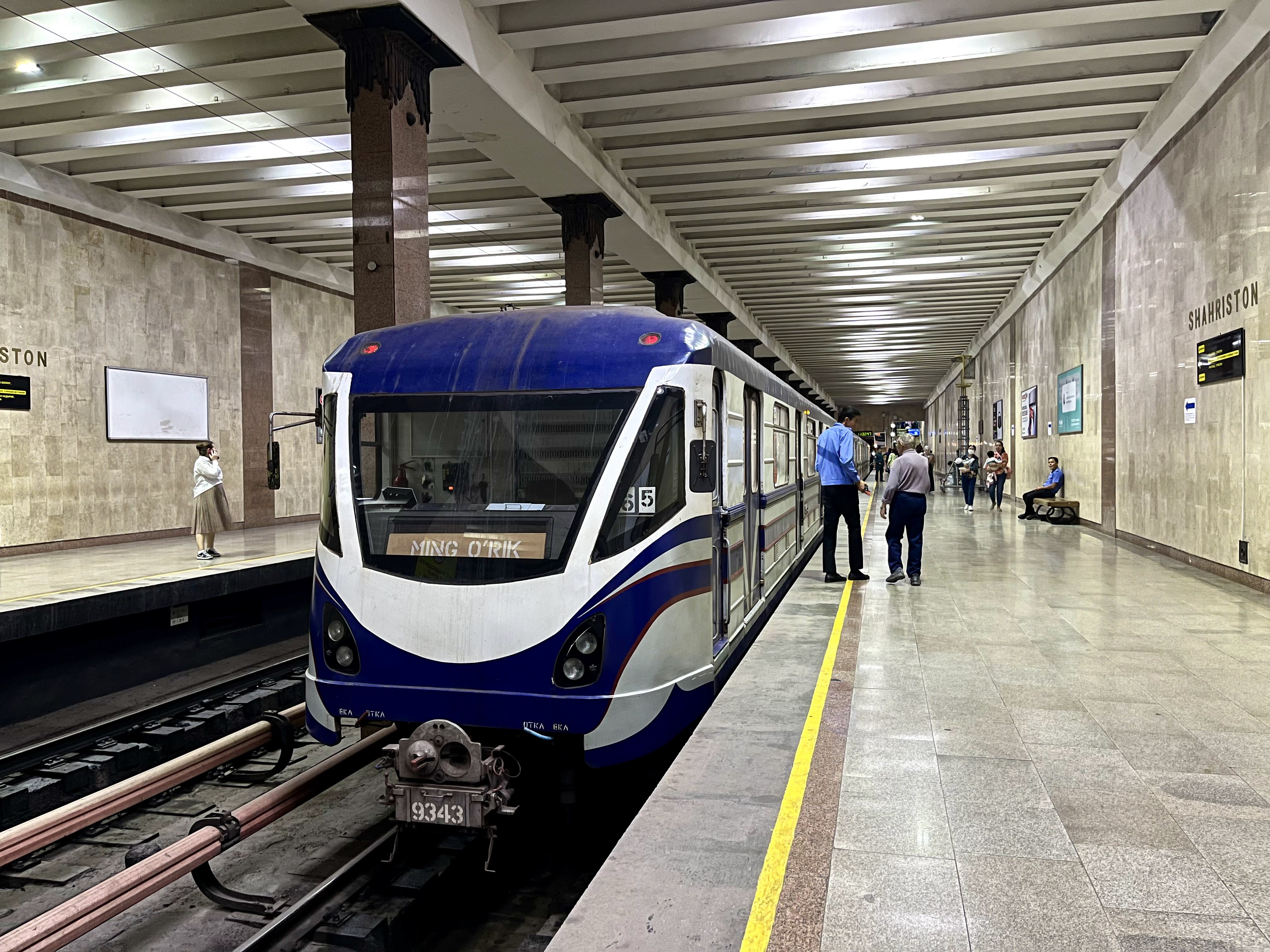

General information
- Location: Tashkent, Uzbekistan
- Coordinates: 41.353836°N 69.288197°E
- System: Tashkent Metro
- Platforms: island platform
- Tracks: 2

History
- Opened: 26 October 2001

Services
Preceding station	Tashkent Metro	Following station
Yunusobod towards Turkiston	Yunusobod Line	Bodomzor towards Ming O‘rik
Location

Shahriston is a station of the Tashkent Metro on Yunusobod Line. It was opened on 24 October 2001 as part of the inaugural section of the line, between Ming O‘rik and Habib Abdullayev. Previously it was called Habib Abdullayev (Uzbek: Habib Abdullayev, Ҳабиб Абдуллаев) (after the scientist Habib Abdullayev). On June 16, 2015, the station was renamed to "Shahristan" according to the decision of hakim (mayor) Tashkent. The station served the northern terminus of the line until 29 August 2020, when the line was extended north to Turkiston.
