= Amir Temur Xiyoboni (Tashkent Metro) =

Tashkent Metro Station

General information
- Location: Tashkent, Uzbekistan
- Coordinates: 41.312164°N 69.28145°E
- System: Tashkent Metro
- Platforms: island platform
- Tracks: 2

History
- Opened: 6 November 1977
- Former names: Oktyabr inqilobi (Oktyabrskoy Revolutsii) (1977–1992), Markaziy Xiyoboni (1992–1993)

Services
Preceding station	Tashkent Metro	Following station
Hamid Olimjon towards Buyuk Ipak Yoli	Chilonzor Line	Mustaqilliq Maidoni towards Chinor
Abdulla Qodirii towards Turkiston	Yunusobod Line transfer at Yunus Rajabiy	Ming O‘rik Terminus
Location

Amir Temur Xiyoboni (Uzbek pronunciation: [æˈmir teˈmur xijɒbɒˈni]; “Amir Timur Square”) is a station of the Tashkent Metro on Chilonzor Line. It is a transfer station to Yunus Rajabiy, Yunusobod Line. The station is named for Amir Timur Square.

== History ==
Station entrance

The station was opened on 6 November 1977 It was part of the first section of the Chilonzor line between Oktyabr inqilobi and Sabir Rakhimov. It was the northern terminus of the inaugural section of Tashkent Metro. Prior to 1 May 1992 it was called "Oktyabr inqilobi" ( "October Revolution"), before it was renamed "Markaziy xiyoboni" ( "Central Square"). The station received its current name on 1 August 1993. On 31 August 1980 the line was extended further north to Maksim Gor'kiy.

It is a column-type station with two underground vestibules, combined with pedestrian subways.

The design and construction of the station used precast concrete. Floor slabs are hidden behind a false ceiling, lighting fixtures installed in the beams. Facing the station are columns Nuratau white marble. The walls of the tunnel track are Gazgan reddish marble. The Paul station is granite gray and black.

Earlier, the walls of the track tunnel had panels of hammered copper made by sculptors V. Lunev and L. Ryabtsev. Probably because of the revolutionary theme, after independence they were dismantled.
