= Qoʻyliq (Tashkent Metro) =

Tashkent Metro Station

General information
- Location: Tashkent; Uzbekistan
- Coordinates: 41°14′14.7″N 69°19′38.8″E
- System: Tashkent Metro
- Tracks: 2

History
- Opened: 30 August 2020

Services
Preceding station	Tashkent Metro	Following station
Yangiobod towards Texnopark	Circle Line	Matonat towards Qipchoq
Location

Qoʻyliq is a Tashkent Metro station on the Circle Line. It was opened on 30 August 2020 as the southern terminus of the inaugural section of the line between Texnopark and Qoʻylik. On 30 August 2020 the line was extended to Quruvchilar, and the station ceased to be the terminus. The adjacent stations are Yangiobod and Matonat.

The original name of the station was 7-Bekat, which means "Station 7", and in August 2023 Qoʻyliq, together with other stations of the line, was given a proper name.
