= Texnopark (Tashkent Metro) =

Tashkent Metro Station

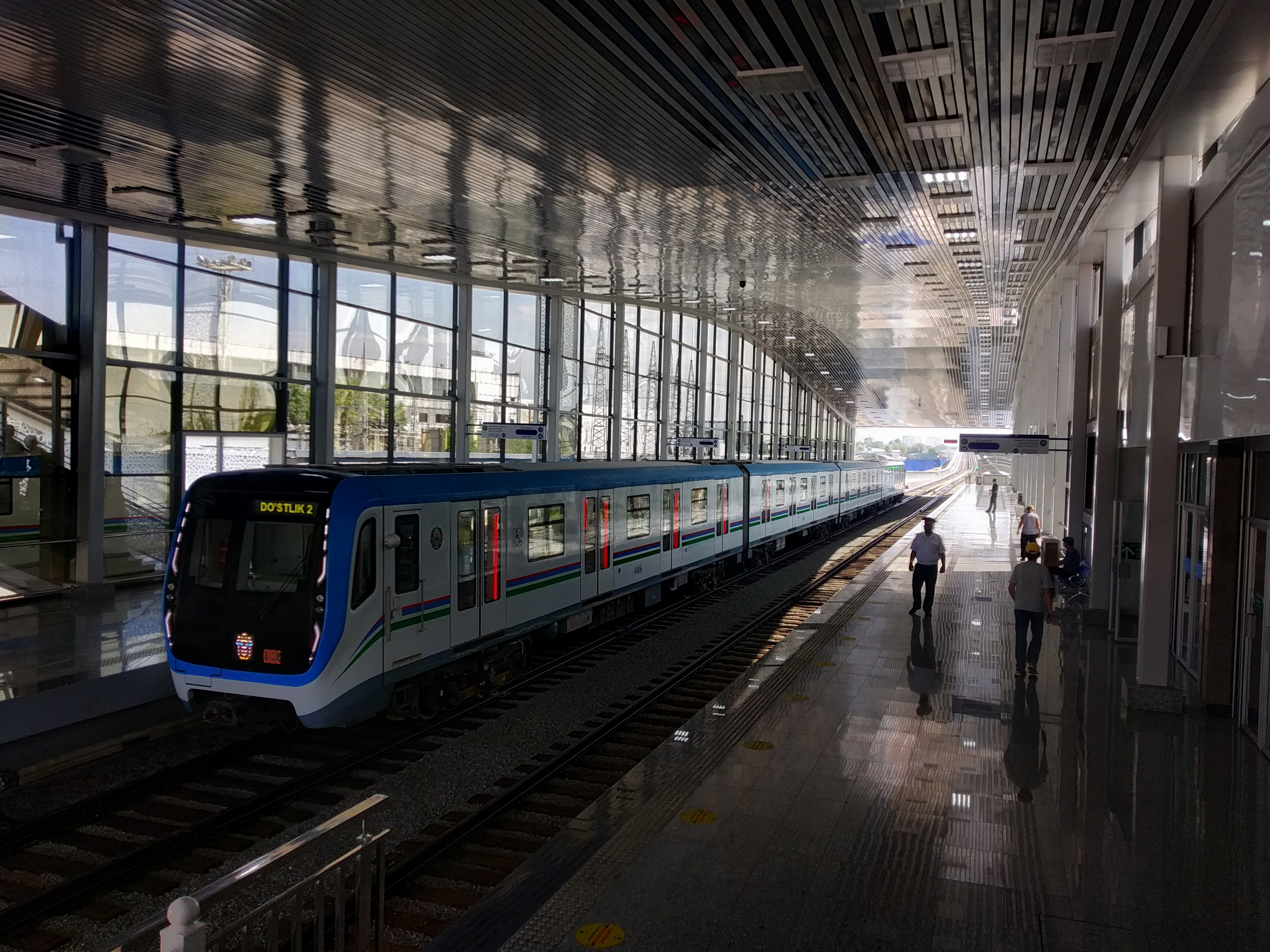

General information
- Location: Tashkent; Uzbekistan
- Coordinates: 41°17′40.3″N 69°19′22.4″E
- System: Tashkent Metro
- Tracks: 2

History
- Opened: 30 August 2020

Services
Preceding station	Tashkent Metro	Following station
Terminus	Circle Line	Yashnobod towards Qipchoq
Location

Texnopark is a Tashkent Metro station and the northern terminus of Circle Line. It was opened on 30 August 2020 as part of the inaugural section of the line between Texnopark and Qoʻyliq. The adjacent station is Yashnobod. Transfer to Doʻstlik on Oʻzbekiston Line is available.

Until August 2023, this station did not have an official name; the temporary name was 1-Bekat, which means "Station 1". At the same time, there was another 1-Bekat station in Tashkent, which later became Choshtepa.
