= Oʻzbekiston Line =

The Oʻzbekiston Line (Uzbek: Oʻzbekiston yoʻli, Ўзбекистон йўли, Russian: Узбекистанская линия, romanized: Uzbekistanskaya liniya) or in English, the Uzbekistan Line is a line of the Tashkent Metro. Opened in 1984, it connects the northwestern districts of the city with the city centre and then continues eastwards.

== Timeline ==
Segment	Date opened	Length
Alisher Navoiy—Toshkent	December 8, 1984	4.8 km
Toshkent—Dustlik	November 6, 1987	3.3 km
Alisher Navoiy—Chorsu	November 6, 1989	2.4 km
Chorsu—Beruniy	April 30, 1991	3.8
Total:	11 Stations	14.3 km

== Name changes ==
Station	Previous name(s)	Years
Kosmonavtlar	Kosmonavtlar Prospekti	1984–1992
Mashinasozlar	Tashselmash	1987–1992
Doʻstlik	Chkalov	1987–2012

== Transfers ==
#	Transfer to	At
1	Chilonzor Line	Alisher Navoiy
3	Yunusobod Line	Oybek
4	Circle Line	Doʻstlik
