= Turkiston (Tashkent Metro) =

Tashkent Metro Station

General information
- Location: Tashkent; Uzbekistan
- Coordinates: 41°22′39″N 69°17′45.7″E
- System: Tashkent Metro
- Platforms: island platform
- Tracks: 2

History
- Opened: 29 August 2020

Services
Preceding station	Tashkent Metro	Following station
Terminus	Yunusobod Line	Yunusobod towards Ming O‘rik
Location

Turkiston is a Tashkent Metro station and the northern terminus of Yunusobod line. It was opened on 29 August 2020 together with Yunusobod. The adjacent station is Yunusobod.

The construction of the station started in 2016. On 16 June 2020, Uzbek Railways, which owns Tashkent Metro, reported that the construction has been completed. The station is located in Yunusobod district of Tashkent and is expected to considerably aid with the passenger traffic situation in the city.
