= Qipchoq (Tashkent Metro) =

Tashkent Metro Station

General information
- Location: Tashkent; Uzbekistan
- Coordinates: 41°12′20″N 69°13′17″E
- System: Tashkent Metro
- Tracks: 2

History
- Opened: 11 March 2024

Services
| Preceding station | Tashkent Metro | Following station |
|---|---|---|
| Turon towards Texnopark | Circle Line | Terminus |
Location

Qipchoq is a Tashkent Metro station, the terminus of the Circle Line. It was opened on 11 March 2024 as part of the extension of the line from Quruvchilar. The adjacent station is Turon.
