= Yunusobod Line =

Line of the Tashkent metro

The Yunusobod Line (Uzbek: Yunusobod yo'li, Юнусобод йўли; Russian: Юнусабадская линия; Yunusabadskaya linaya) is the third line of the Tashkent Metro, opened in 2001. The line is 7.8 km long.

== Timeline ==
Segment	Date opened	Length
Shahriston—Ming O‘rik	24 October 2001	7.6 km
Turkiston—Shahriston	29 August 2020	2.9 km
Total:	8 Stations	10.5 km

== Transfers ==
#	Transfer to	At
1	Chilonzor Line	Yunus Rajabiy
2	Ozbekiston Line	Ming O‘rik

== Name changes ==
Station	Previous name(s)	Years
Shahriston	Habib Abdullaev	2001–2015

== Expansion plans ==
After its opening in August 2001, construction began on a northwards extension. However in 2003 all work was abandoned at 15% completion due to financial difficulties. In December 2016, construction work began again on the unfinished 2.9 km section of track between the Turkiston and Yunusobod stations. The two stations were designed to be accessible to people with disabilities such as wheelchair users. The estimated total cost of the project was 103.8 million USD.
