= Olmazor (Tashkent Metro) =

Tashkent Metro Station

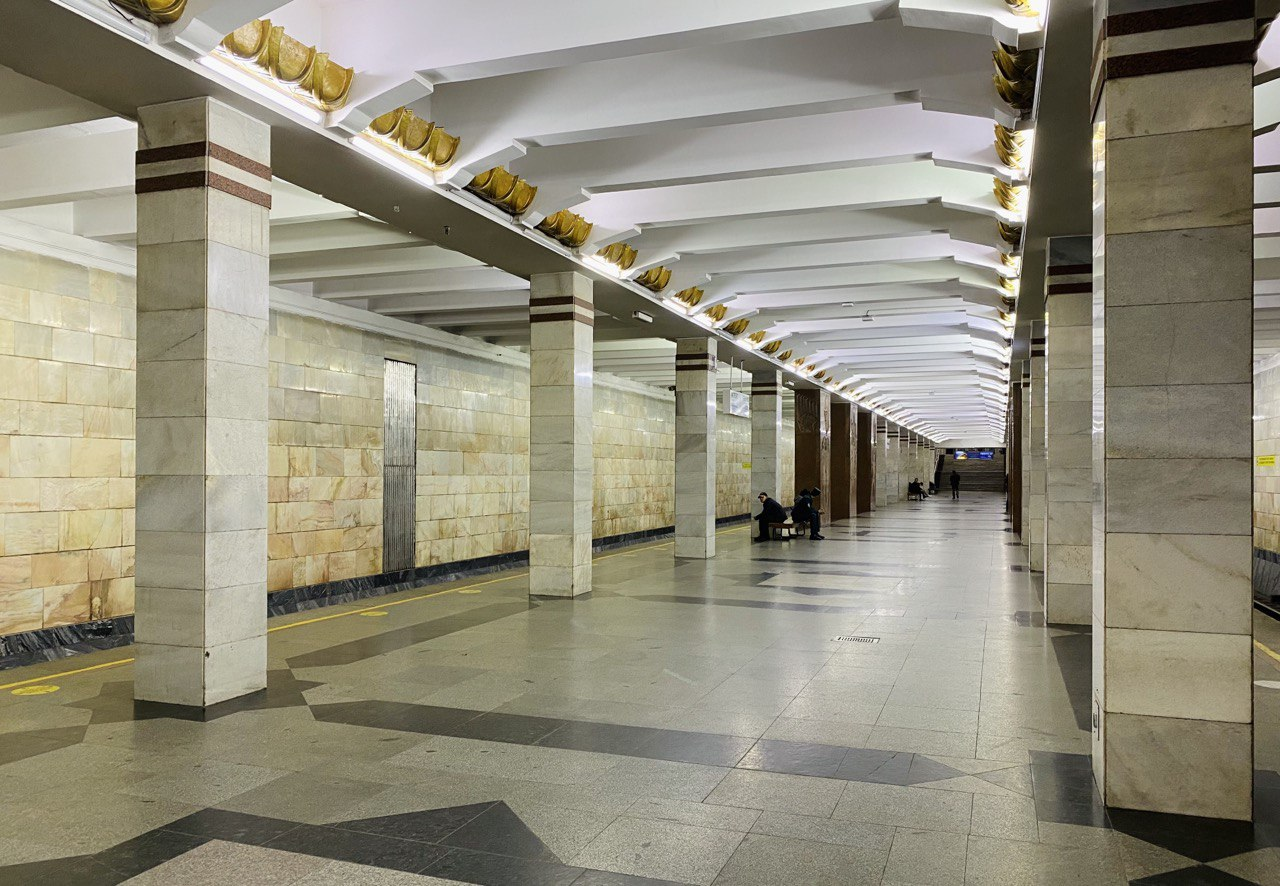

General information
- Location: Tashkent, Uzbekistan
- Coordinates: 41.255611°N 69.196014°E
- System: Tashkent Metro
- Platforms: island platform
- Tracks: 2

History
- Opened: 6 November 1977
- Former names: Sobir Raximov (1977—2010)

Services
Preceding station	Tashkent Metro	Following station
Chilonzor towards Buyuk Ipak Yoli	Chilonzor Line	Choshtepa towards Chinor
Location

Olmazor is a station of the Tashkent Metro on Chilonzor Line. It is located between Chilonzor and Choshtepa.

The station was opened on 6 November 1977 as the southern terminus of the inaugural section of Tashkent Metro, between October inkilobi and Sabir Rakhimov. Until 2010, the station was known as Sabir Rakhimov. On December 26, 2020 the extension of the line to Chinor was opened, and Olmazar ceased to be the terminus of the line.
