= Beruniy (Tashkent Metro) =

Tashkent Metro Station

General information
- Location: Tashkent, Uzbekistan
- Coordinates: 41.345428°N 69.206767°E
- System: Tashkent Metro
- Platforms: island platform
- Tracks: 2

History
- Opened: 30 April 1991

Services
Preceding station	Tashkent Metro	Following station
Terminus	Oʻzbekiston Line	Tinchlik towards Doʻstlik
Location

Beruniy is a station of the Tashkent Metro, it is the northwestern terminus of the Oʻzbekiston Line. The station was opened on 30 April 1991 as part of the extension of the line from Chorsu to Beruniy. The station is designed in national traditions of Uzbekistan: the platform hall is decorated by a dome covered with marble patterns. The plant has crystal chandeliers, with all - in the lobby, in the walls of the stairs and in the hall are made in the same style (painter S. Jalilov). Interior wall decoration station is made with marble, granite, metal, glass, porcelain.
