= Doʻstlik (Tashkent Metro) =

Metro station in Tashkent, Uzbekistan

Doʻstlik (Dustlik)
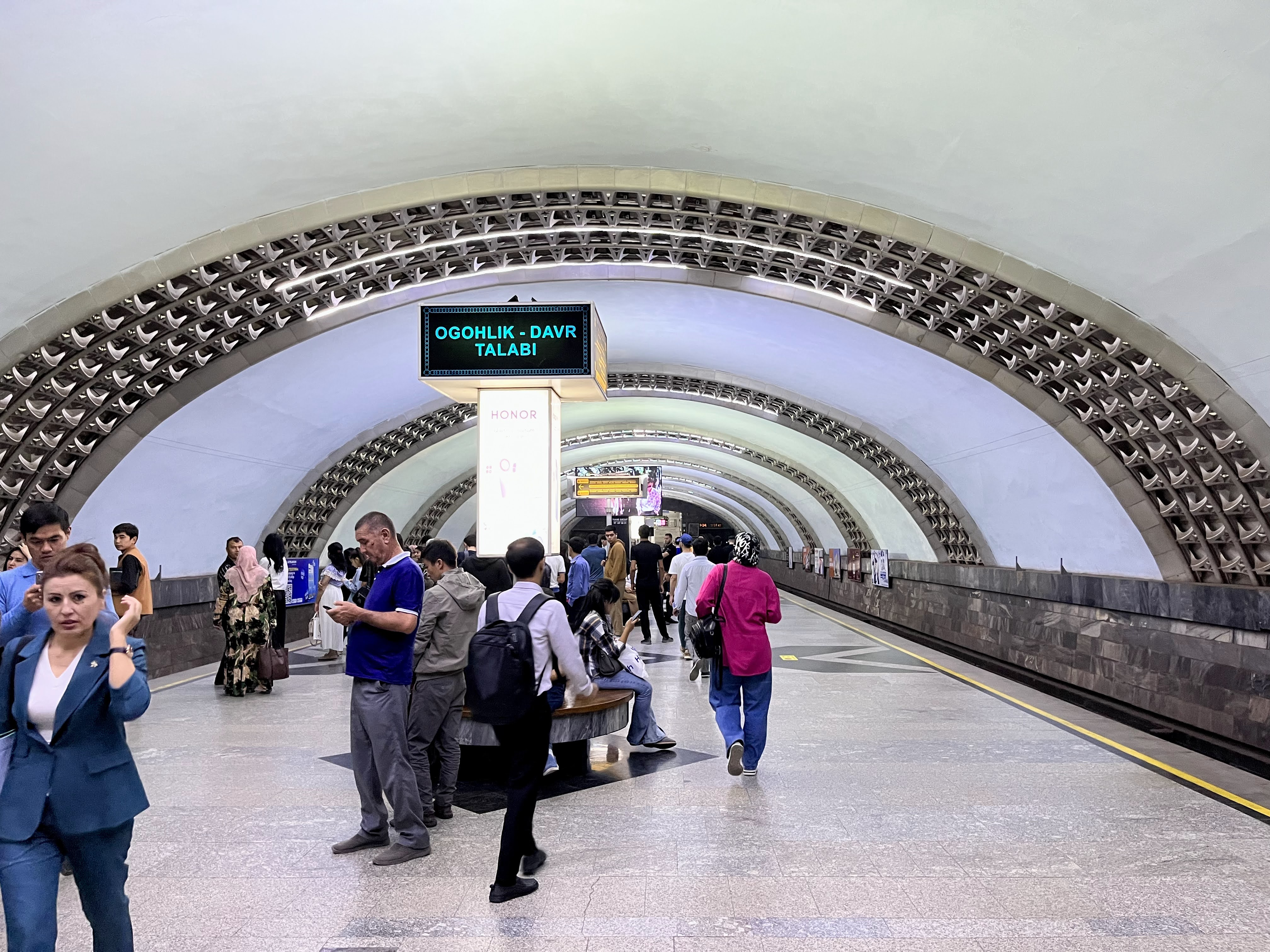

General information
- Location: Tashkent, Uzbekistan
- Coordinates: 41.293539°N 69.322686°E
- System: Tashkent Metro
- Platforms: island platform
- Tracks: 2

History
- Opened: 7 November 1987

Services
Preceding station	Tashkent Metro	Following station
Mashinasozlar towards Beruniy	Oʻzbekiston Line	Terminus
Location

Doʻstlik or Dustlik (formerly Chkalov) is a station of the Tashkent Metro on the Oʻzbekiston Line. The station opened on 6 November 1987 as the eastern terminus of the extension of the line from Toshkent. In 2012 the station's name was changed from Chkalov to Dustlik.
