= Chilonzor Line =

The Chilonzor Line (Uzbek: Chilonzor yo'li, Чилонзор йўли, Russian: Чиланзарская линия, Chilanzarskaya liniya) was the first line of the Tashkent Metro, opened in 1977 it connected the southern districts of the city with the centre, and then in 1980 extended westwards.

== Timeline ==
Segment	Date opened	Length
Olmazor—Amir Temur Xiyoboni	November 6, 1977	12.2 km
Amir Temur Xiyoboni—Buyuk Ipak Yoli	August 18, 1980	4.6 km
Olmazor—Chinor	December 25, 2020	6.9 km
Total:	17 Stations	23.7 km

== Name changes ==
Station	Previous name(s)	Years
Buyuk Ipak Yoli	Maxim Gorkiy	1980–1997
Amir Temur Xiyoboni	Oktyabrinkilobi (Oktyabrskoy Revolutsii)	1977–1992
Amir Temur Xiyoboni	Markaziy Xiyoboni	1992–1993
Mustaqilliq Maidoni	Lenin Maidoni (Ploshchad Lenina)	1977–1991
Milliy Bog	Yoshlik	1977–2006
Mirzo Ulugbek	50 Let SSSR	1977–1992
Bunyodkor	Xalqlar Do’stligi	1977–2008
Olmazor	Sobir Raximov	1977—2010
Novza	Hamza	1977—2015

== Transfers ==
#	Transfer to	At
2	Oʻzbekiston Line	Paxtakor
3	Yunusobod Line	Amir Temur Xiyoboni
