= Chinor (Tashkent Metro) =

Tashkent Metro Station in Uzbekistan

General information
- Location: Tashkent, Uzbekistan
- Coordinates: 41.20601°N 69.21950°E
- System: Tashkent Metro

History
- Opened: 26 December 2020

Services
Preceding station	Tashkent Metro	Following station
Yangihayot towards Buyuk Ipak Yoli	Chilonzor Line	Terminus
Location

Chinor is a station of the Tashkent Metro on Chilonzor Line. It is the southern terminus of the line. The station was put into operation on 26 December 2020 as part of the third section of Chilonzor line, between Olmazor and Chinor. The adjacent station is Yangihayot.

Until August 2023 this station did not have any official name and temporary name was 5-Bekat. At the same time, there was another 5-Bekat station in Tashkent, which later became Rohat.
