= Buyuk Ipak Yoli (Tashkent Metro) =

Tashkent Metro Station

General information
- Location: Tashkent, Uzbekistan
- Coordinates: 41.326344°N 69.327769°E
- System: Tashkent Metro
- Platforms: island platform
- Tracks: 2

History
- Opened: 18 August 1980
- Former names: Maxim Gorkiy

Services
Preceding station	Tashkent Metro	Following station
Terminus	Chilonzor Line	Pushkin towards Chinor
Location

Buyuk Ipak Yoli is a station of the Tashkent Metro, the northern terminus of Chilonzor Line. It was opened on 18 August 1980 as part of the second section of Chilonzor Line, between October inkilobi and Maksim Gor'kiy.

The station was previously known as Maksim Gor'kiy. It was renamed on 1 May 1987.
