= Tashkent Metro =

Rapid transit system in Uzbekistan

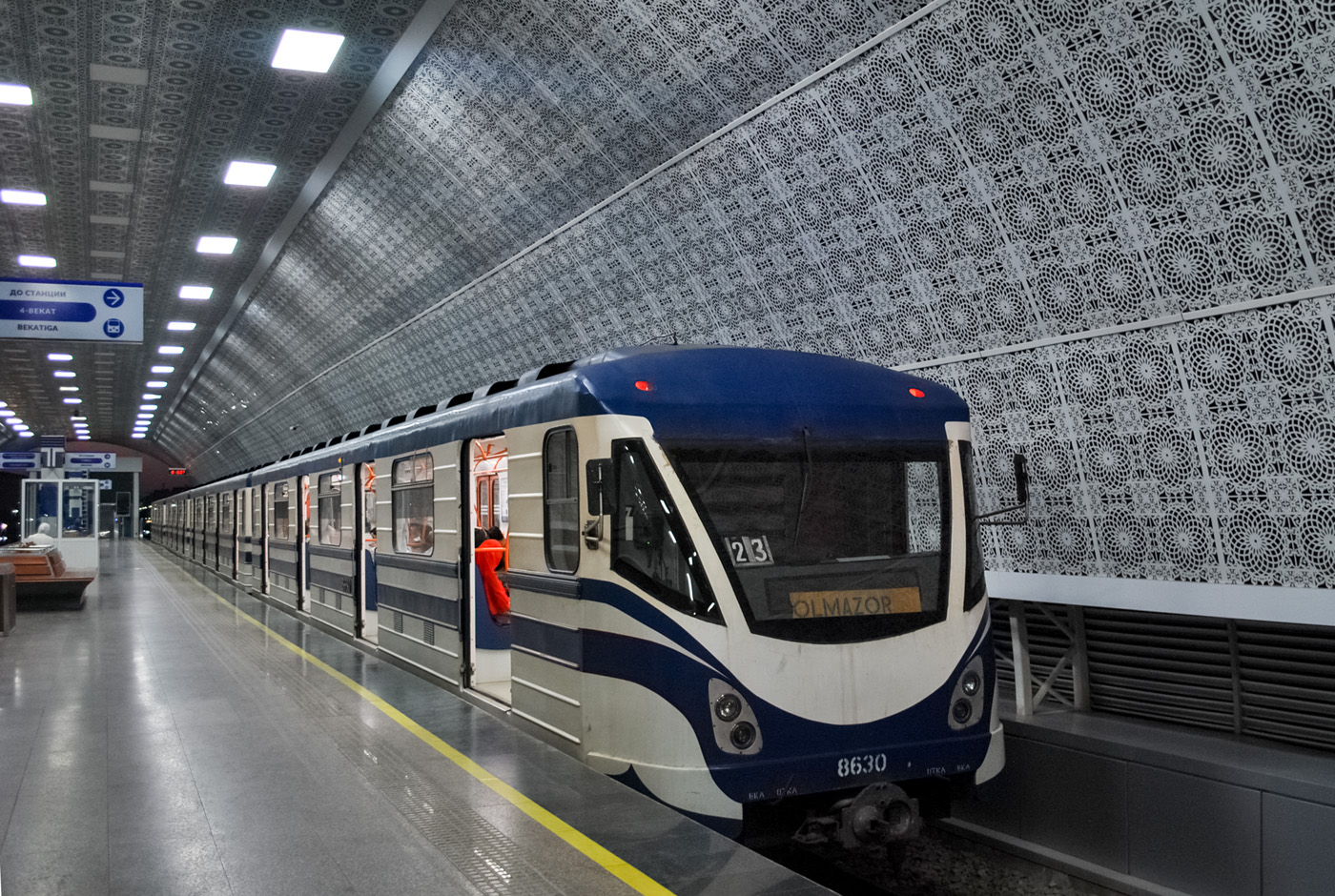
- An 81-717/714 train at Chinor Station

Overview
- Native name: Toshkent Metropoliteni
- Owner: State ownership
- Locale: Tashkent, Uzbekistan
- Transit type: Rapid transit
- Number of lines: 4
- Number of stations: 50
- Daily ridership: ▲785,000 (average, 2025)
- Annual ridership: ▲286.8 million (2025)
- Website: https://uzmetro.uz/

Operation
- Began operation: 6 November 1977; 49 years ago
- Operator: Toshkent Metropoliteni
- Number of vehicles: 168
- Train length: 4 cars

Technical
- System length: 70.4 km (43.7 mi)
- Track gauge: 1,520 mm (4 ft 11 27/32 in)
- Electrification: 825 V DC (third rail)
- Average speed: 46 km/h (29 mph)
System map

The Tashkent Metro (Note: Uzbek: Toshkent metropoliteni, Тошкент метрополитени; Russian: Ташкентский метрополитен) is a rapid transit system serving the city of Tashkent, the capital of Uzbekistan. It was the seventh metro system to be built in the former USSR, opening in 1977, and the first metro in Central Asia. Each station is designed around a particular theme, often reflected in the station name.

The Tashkent Metro consists of four lines, operating on 70.4 kilometres (43.74 mi) of route and serving 50 stations. In 2025, the metro carried 286.8 million passengers, which corresponds to a daily average of approximately 785,000 passengers.

== History ==
Planning for the Tashkent Metro started in 1968, two years after a major earthquake struck the city in 1966. Construction on the first line (the Chilanzar line) began in 1972 and it opened on 6 November 1977 with nine stations. This line was extended in 1980, and the second line was added in 1984. The most recent line is the Circle (Halqa) Line, the first section of which opened in 2020.

A northern extension of the Yunusobod Line for 2 stations Turkiston and Yunusobod was completed and opened on 29 August 2020. The fourth Circle line is currently under construction, first 7 stations for the line have already been built in 2020.

== Operations ==
The Tashkent Metro operates three regular lines and a circle line (under further extension), which currently runs 66.5 km (41.32 mi) of route and serve 48 stations. The metro network employs more than 4,200 staff. In 2021, revenues from fares amount to 10.5 billion Uzbekistani sum a month.

The depth of the metro's tunnels varies between 8–25 metres (26 ft 3 in – 82 ft 0 in). The strong construction of these three lines can resist earthquakes of a magnitude of 9.0 on the Richter scale. It sports a 1,520 mm (4 ft 11 27/32 in) gauge and a third rail power supply (825 V DC). The average station distance is 1.40 kilometres (0.87 mi).

== Lines ==
Tashkent Metro operates 4 lines:

Line	Name	Opened	Length	Stations
	Chilonzor Line	1977	23.7 km (14.73 mi)	17
	Oʻzbekiston Line	1984	14.3 km (8.89 mi)	11
	Yunusobod Line	2001	10.5 km (6.52 mi)	8
	Circle (Halqa) Line	2020	21.9 km (13.6 mi)	14
Total:			70.4 km (43.74 mi)	50

A classical design of Kosmonavtlar station built in 1984

=== Chilonzor Line (red) ===
Construction on this line started in 1968, opened in 1977 between Olmazor (previously named as Sabir Rakhimov) and Amir Temur Khiyoboni (previously named as Oktyabr Inqilobi) including Novza (previously named as Khamza) depot and one metro bridge over Oqtepa channel between Novza and Milliy Bog' (previously named as Komsomolskaya) stations. It was extended to Buyuk Ipak Yoli (previously names as Maksim Gorkiy) in 1980 (including another metro bridge over Salar river between Hamid Olimjon and Pushkin stations). It is 23.7 kilometres (14.73 mi) long with 17 stations.

A 7 km (4.35 mi) extension of the Chilonzor Line south from Olmazor station to Quipchoq (5-Bekat) station in the Sergeli district of Tashkent was built in 3 years and inaugurated by President Shavkat Mirziyoyev on 26 December 2020.

The future planned 3 stations eastward extension from Buyuk Ipak Yoli to TTZ (Toshkent Traktor Zavodi) is under consideration.

=== Oʻzbekiston Line (blue) ===
The route of this line crosses the city diagonally from northwest to southeast via the Toshkent Railway station. It opened in 1984 and expanded between 1984 and 1991. It is 14.3 kilometres (8.89 mi) long with 11 stations.

=== Yunusobod Line (green) ===
Work is under way on this line to connect the northern districts to the airport in the south. The first 10.5 kilometres (6.52 mi) section with 8 underground stations opened for regular service on 24 October 2001 between Ming O‘rik and Shahriston (previously named as Habib Abdullayev).

=== Circle Line (gold) ===
Construction of new line started in October 2017. The project will be completed in 5 stages and developed and implemented jointly with specialists from Russia, Turkey and Germany. When completed, the Circle line will serve 35 stations and it will be 52.1 kilometres (32.37 mi) long with an elevated above ground section of 50.5 kilometres (31.38 mi) on 6 meters (19 ft 8 in) overpasses and 1.6 kilometres (0.99 mi) on the ground level.

In February 2020, it was reported that construction of the first section of the Circle Line from Do'stlik to Qo'yliq stations was finished and that new rolling stock for the Circle Line was undergoing trials. On 30 August 2020, Circle line's first section was opened with seven stations and a length of 11 kilometres (6.84 mi). A five station extension of the line from Qoʻyliq to Quruvchilar opened 25 April 2023. A further two station extension was completed on 11 March 2025.

== Stations ==
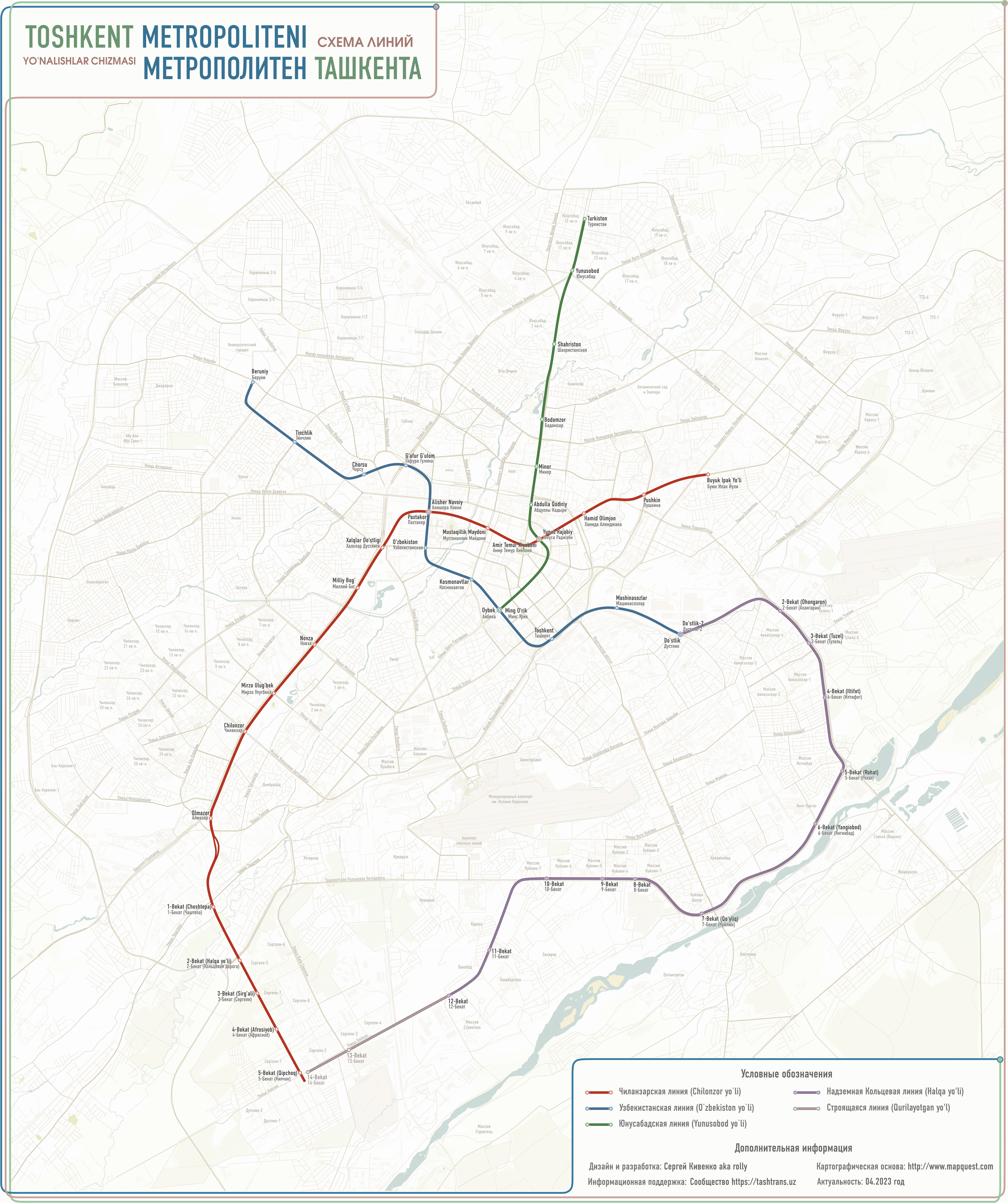
Tashkent Metro Map as of April 2023

Today, the Tashkent Metro has 48 stations that differ from each other. The architecture and décor of each station reflects its name. One peculiarity of the Tashkent metro is its rather shallow depth. Some stations have escalators, 7 stations belong to the tower type, 4 stations to the arch type and one station (Mustaqillik Maydoni) to the tower-individual type. Prominent architects and artists of Uzbekistan took part in designing the stations. Materials used for the interior décor include metal, glass, plastic, granite, marble, smalt, ceramics and alabaster. Each station contains original works of art, and is based on a particular theme. After the break up of the Soviet Union in 1991 many stations were renamed to remove references to Communism.

== Monthly tariffs ==
Daily or monthly tariffs and tariffs for a five day or seven day period, as well as for 3 month and 6 month and for a year are only available if you purchase an ATTO card, more information about atto cards is available at atto.uz

Bus + Metro tariffs for a specific period, prices shown in UZS [Uzbek soums]:

period	1 day	5 days	7 days	10 days	15 days	20 days	30 days	90 days	180 days	1 year
ATTO CARD for general public	8,500	36,000	46,000	73,000	110,000	147,000	221,000	604,000	1,123,000	2,073,000
ATTO CARD for pupils	4,250	18,000	23,000	36,500	55,000	73,500	110,500	302,000	561,500	1,036,500
For elderly people	4,250	18,000	23,000	36,500	55,000	73,500	110,500	302,000	561,500	1,036,500
For students	4,250	18,000	23,000	36,500	55,000	73,500	110,500	302,000	561,500	1,036,500

== Ticketing ==
In 2020, an automated payment system based on NFC technology was introduced at all metro stations. Stationary validators were installed as well. A single transport card (ATTO), which was initially used in test mode at the Bodomzor and Mustaqillik Maydoni metro stations, fully replaced the use of tokens in the Tashkent metro from 1 November 2020.

As of today it is possible to pay for using metro in 3 main ways:

type of payment	price	payment system//credit card or debit card type//ATTO card type	addition information
*Cash	3,000 UZS or USD 0.25	-	No discounts at all
*By using mobile applications as	1,700 UZS or USD 0.13	Apple Pay, Google Pay, Samsung Pay, Oson, Uzum Bank, Payme, ClickUP, MyUzCard, PAYNET	[many of them offer cashbacks or discounts or extra discounts ]
*ATTO Cards	1,700 UZS or USD 0.13	Blue, Yellow, Red and Green	No extra discounts for single trip
*Credit or debit cards of any international or local or russian payment system		List of accepted credit or debit cards: VISA UZCARD UNIONPAY MASTERCARD HUMO MIR	some of the card systems offer discounts for journeys.

The BLUE ATTO [for people who are not students or school pupils or pensioners] card can be recharged at the metro ticketing offices, UZPost offices and the virtual ATTO card can be opened in mobile application. There are 3 other types of preferential transport cards, which can be individually applied for [GREEN ATTO] school pupils, [YELLOW ATTO] university students and [RED ATTO] elderly people at public services offices, which gives them an opportunity to buy monthly or daily or any type of available tariffs with a 50% discount.

One ride costs 3,000 soum (US$0.25) when paid with cash, regardless of distance travelled or number of transfers. Fare enforcement takes place at the points of entry to the stations. Once a passenger has entered the Metro system, there are no further ticket checks; passengers can travel to any number of stations and transfers within the system freely except one stations joint between sergeli line's end station and Qipchoq station transfers, which adds extra 2,000 soums for a transfer if paid with cash or 1,700 soum or cheaper depending on the type of electronic payment;. Transfers to other public transport systems, such as bus, are not covered by the ticket, although there are some discounts or cashbacks presented by many mobile apps and electronic payment systems and credit or debit card systems such as VISA, MasterCARD or UZCARD or others for all the people.

New tariffs offering some discounts for transfers from bus to bus or from bus to metro within the 1 hour period:
Only available when the payment is done whether by credit or debit cards or Apple Pay or Google Pay, or Samsung Pay or ATTO cards:

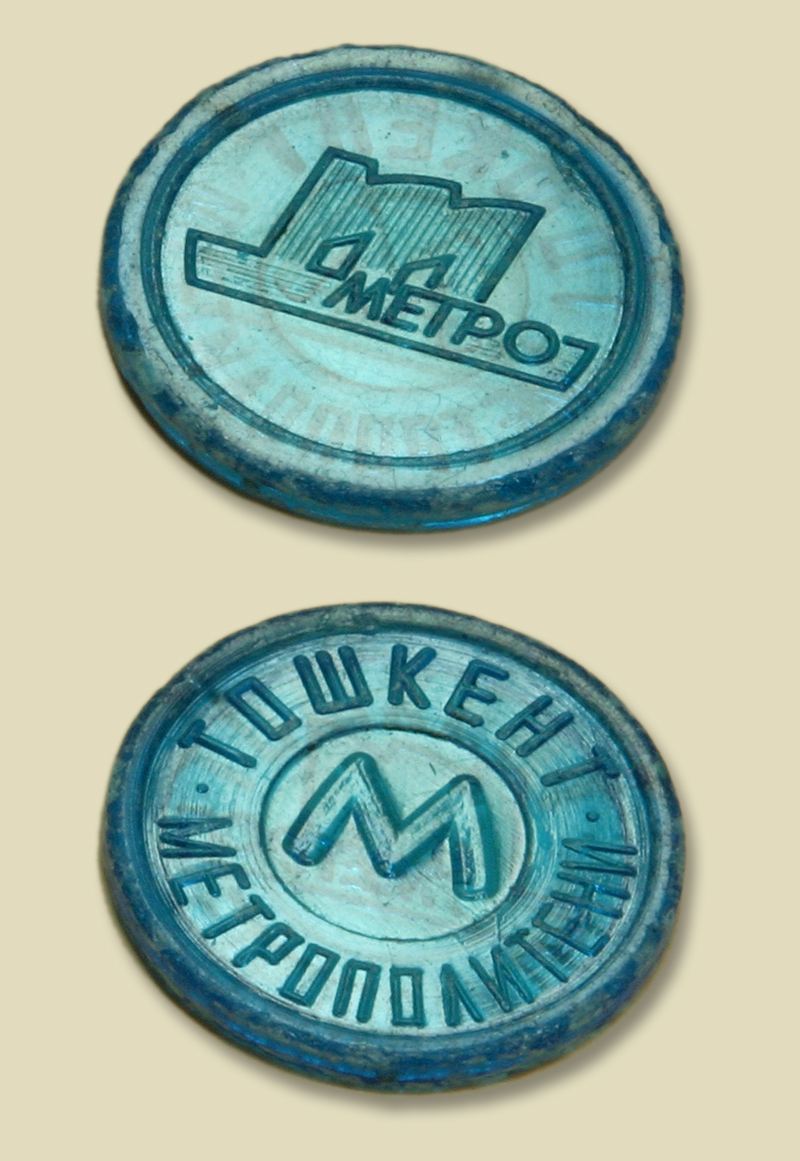
Tashkent Metro Tokenlari

== Passenger regulations ==
Despite a wide range of artistic and architectural features in the metro, photography inside the metro was strictly prohibited by law until 31 May 2018; because the stations were considered military installations due to the system's secondary role as a nuclear bomb shelter. The government under the newly-elected Shavkat Mirziyoyev, ruled that from 1 June 2018, the long-standing ban on photography on the metro would be abolished.

== Rolling stock ==
- Ezh3/Em-508T: 1977–1985.
- 81-717/714: 1980–present.
- 81-718/719: 2001–present.
- 81-717M: 2015–present.
- 81-765.5/766.5/767.5: 2020–present

Like in all Soviet metro systems, the basic type of rolling stock is known as the 81-717/81-714. As of 2013, there are 168 81-717/714 train cars operational on the metro, and they are operated in the form 4-car trainsets serving the system's 100 metres (330 ft) station platforms. Trains have an average commercial speed of 46 kilometres per hour (29 mph). Services started with carriages of type Ezh3 and Em-508T. By the mid-1980s, all these cars were given to Baku and Tbilisi metro. In exchange, the metro has received trains of series 81-717/81-714, which are still in service today.

In 2001, Tashkent metro has received newer trains of 81-718/719. There were plans to purchase trains of series 81-717.6/714.6 for the metro but that didn't happen. There was a decision to modernize the existing 81-717 trains in the Tashkent Carriage Repair Factory. The first modernised train appeared in 2015.

In 2019 new trains of type 81-765/766/767 were ordered for the opening of the Circle line, and with its opening they were given from Uzbekistan line to the Circle line. It is planned to purchase 45 trains of the newest type for the Circle line. If not, then Tashkent metro will receive trains of type 81-775/776/777 that are currently produced in Metrovagonmash.

In April 2021, Tashkent Metro signed a contract to purchase 10 new Russian-made trains from Metrovagonmash. The service life of metro cars and frames is 30 years. The windshield of the driver's cab will be equipped with an adjustable manual sunscreen, taking into account the peculiarities of the Tashkent metro; some of the Tashkent metro lines run above ground.

== Future extension plans ==
Besides building of Circle line around Tashkent metropolitan, Tashkent Metro is working on extension of the current metro lines to 10 more stations. By 2030, Tashkent Metro is planning to build 2 metro stations from the Beruniy station to Karakamysh district, 4 underground metro stations from the station Buyuk Ipak Yoli to TTZ (Toshkent traktor zavodi) neighborhood and 5-6 stations from the station Ming O‘rik to the Tashkent Janubiy (South) railway station.

In March 2021, Metro officials reported about second stage extension of the Circle line. This stage includes a section from the Kuylyuk market, through the Tashkent Ring Road to the capital's Yangihayot district, connecting Khanabad Street in the Zangiata district (Tashkent region) with Kipchak Street in the Sergeli district of Tashkent, including the "5-Bekat" station of the new Sergeli metro line. It is planned to build 9 stations on this stage with a total length of 15 kilometres (9.32 mi).

The Kuylyuk – Kipchak – Yangihayot section is expected to serve about 46 thousand passengers daily. Also, about 700 new jobs will be created.

Additionally it is planned to build another line of metro to the new district of New Tashkent, which is going to be more than 15 kilometers long and contain more than 6 stations at least if it is going to be built.

In March 2021, the Tashkent Metro carried up to 330,000 passengers a day on weekdays and 150,000 passengers on weekends. The goal is to increase the number of passengers to 1 million per day.

== Gallery ==
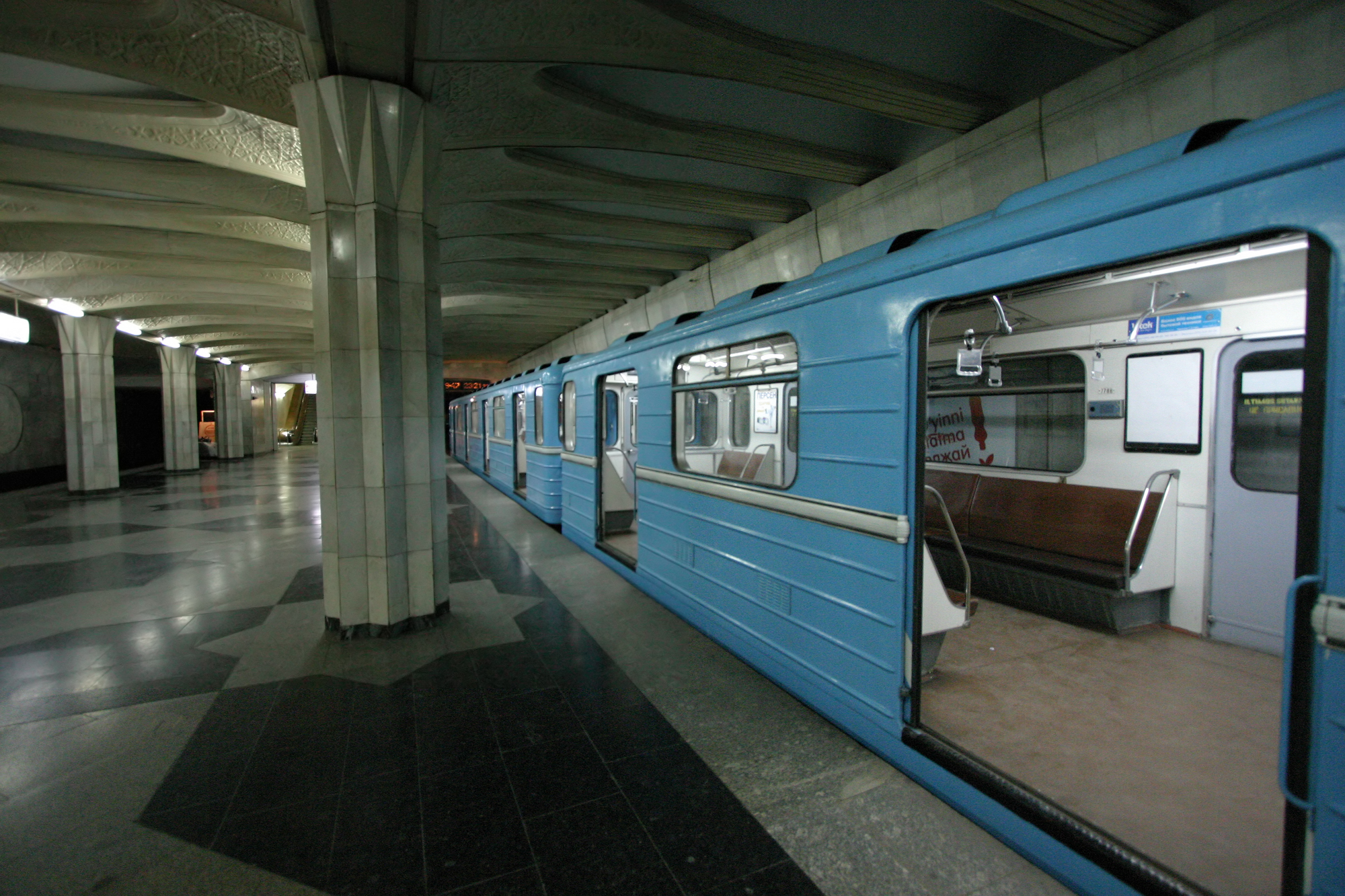

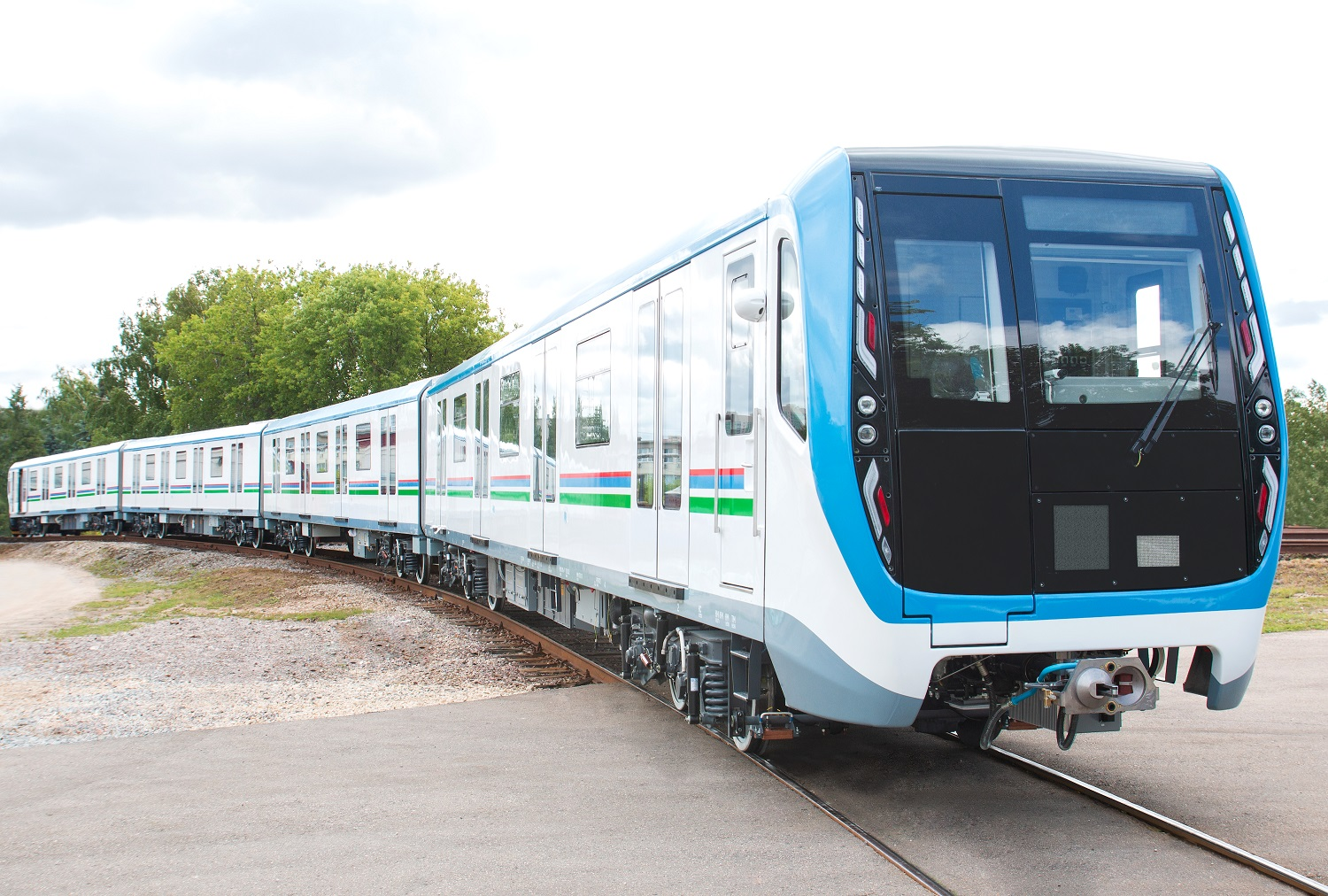

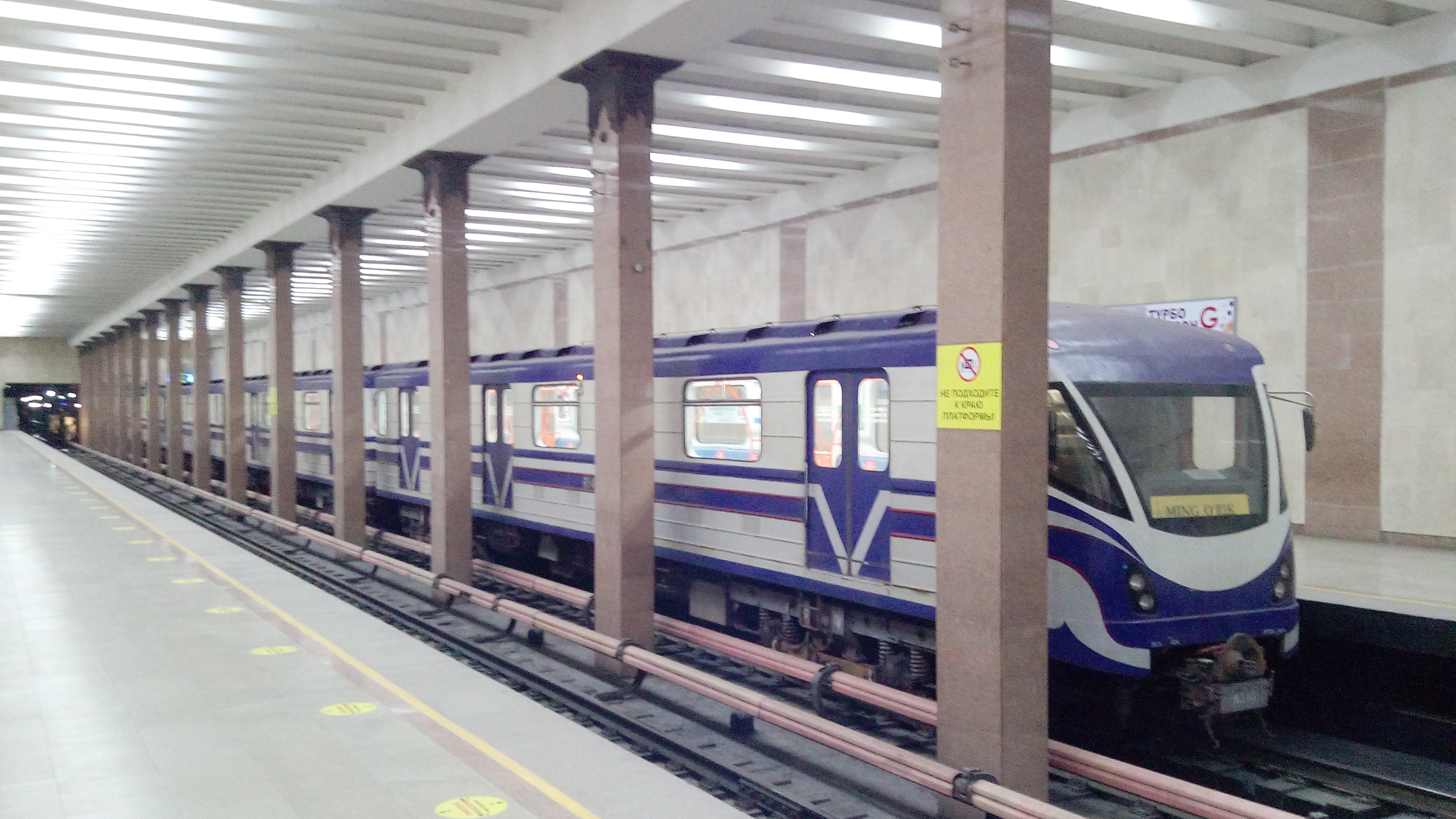
Shahriston station

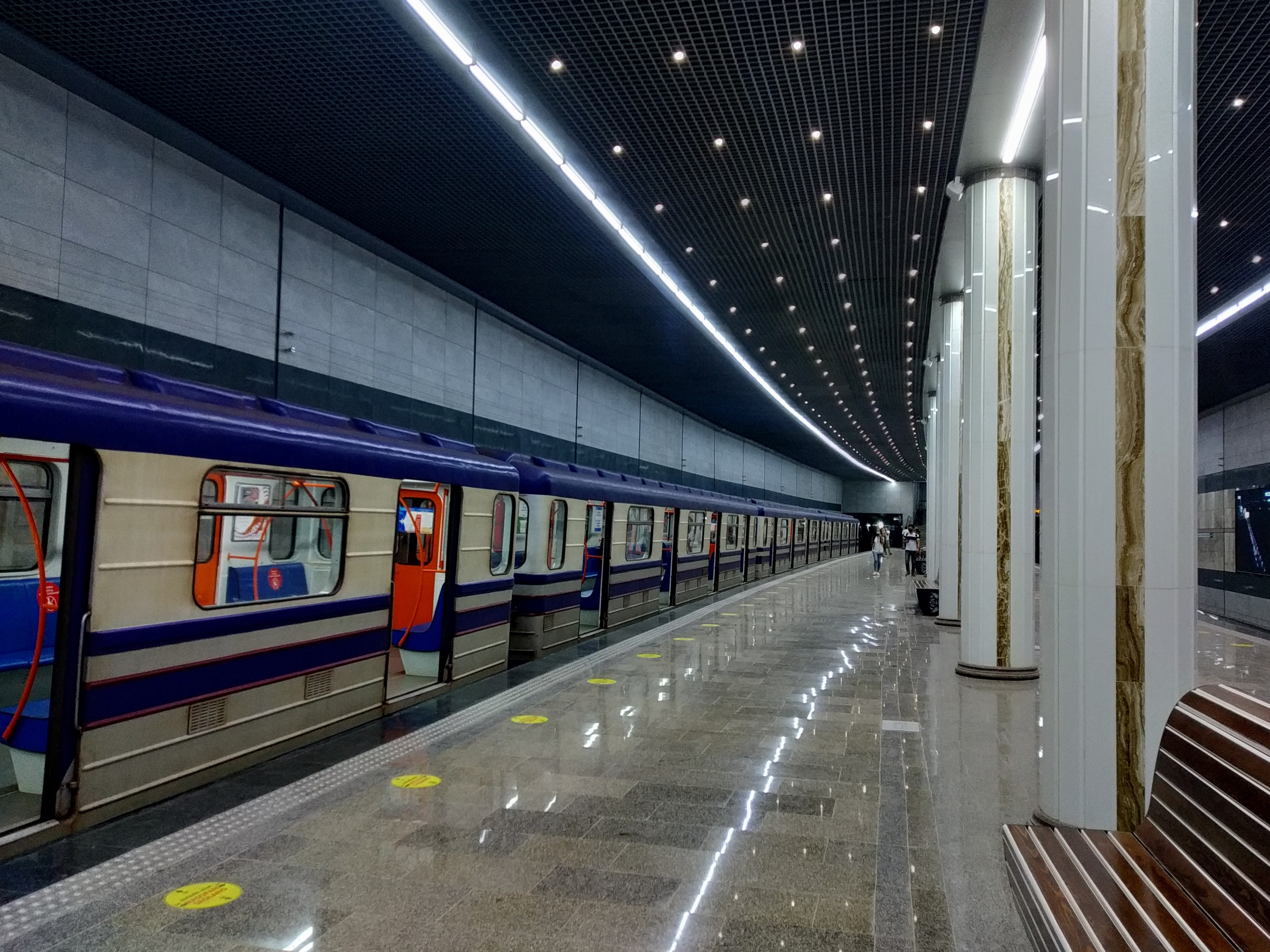
Yunusobod station

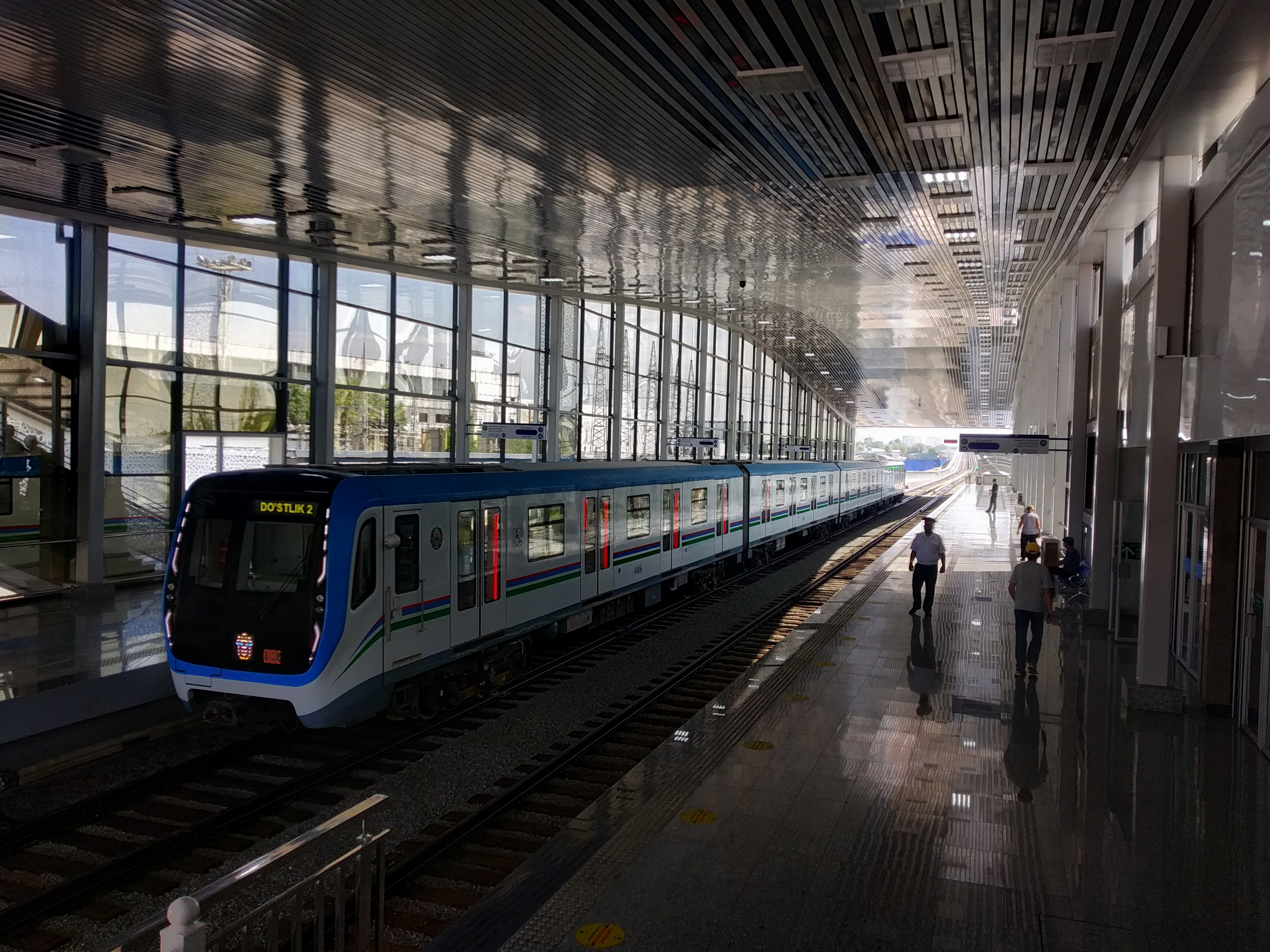

Abdulla Qodirii station

Turkiston station

Gafur Gulom station

Alisher Navoiy station

Badamzar station

== See also ==
- Trams in Tashkent
- List of rapid transit systems
