= Shayboni's hut =

Shaybani's hut
- Shayboniylar daxmasi
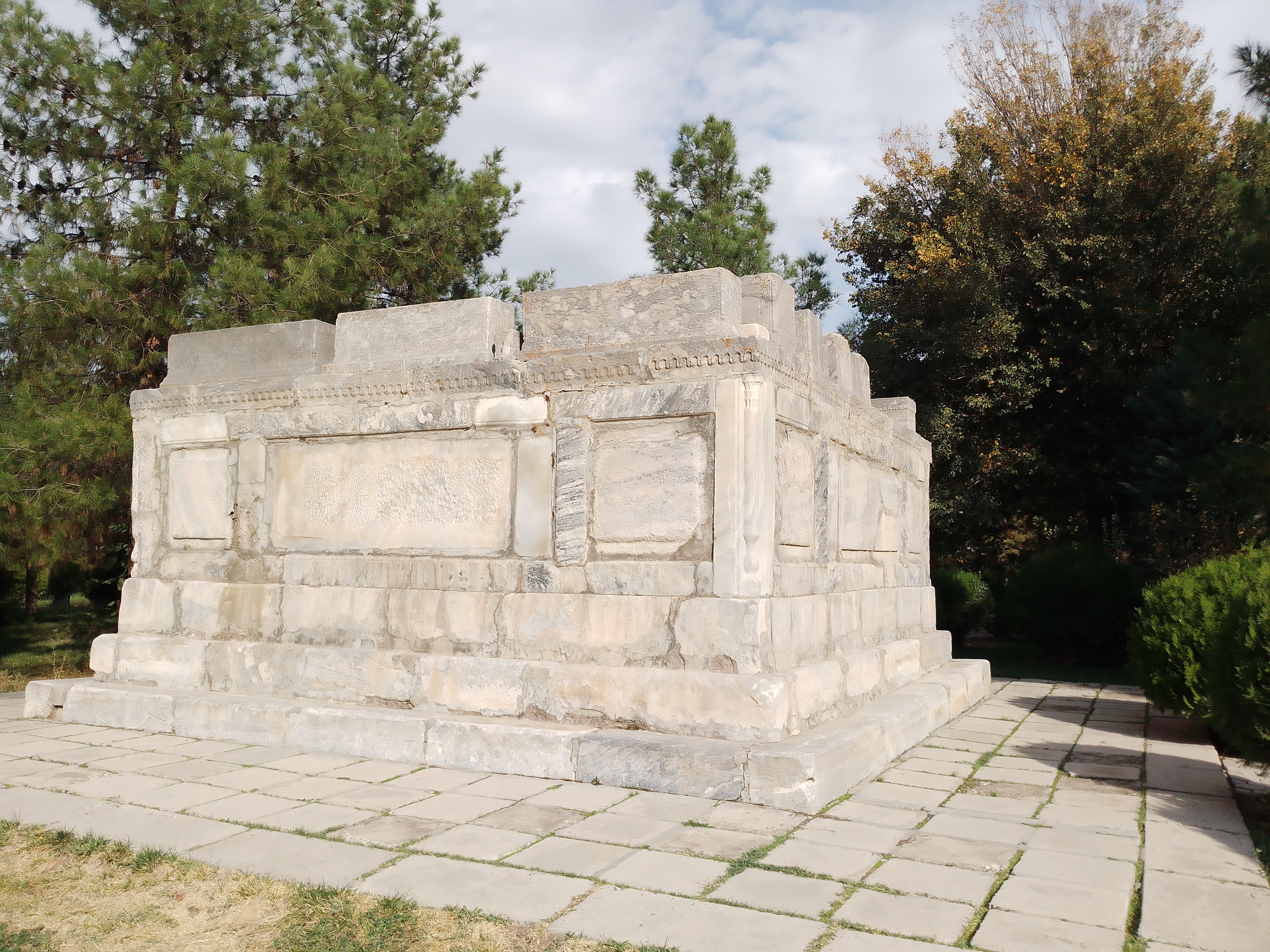
- Interactive map of the Shaybani's hut area

General information
- Type: Madrasah
- Architectural style: Central Asian architecture
- Location: Registan, Samarkand, Uzbekistan
- Coordinates: 39°39′19″N 66°58′34″E
- Opened: XVI
- Owner: State property.

Technical details
- Material: marble and brick

Shaybani's hut is an architectural monument of the Middle Ages. The hut in which representatives of the Shaibani Uzbek dynasty were buried is a marble couch. It was built in the 16th century. It is located in Registan Square, Samarkand, Uzbekistan.

Each side of the shack was 10–11 meters long, and there were 36 tombstones on it. Initially, by the instructions of Mrs. Mehr Sultan, the graves located in the middle of the courtyard of the Shaibani Khan madrasah were transformed into a separate family hut - a high marble sofa. When the road leading to the Bibikhanim mosque was opened, the hut was moved 70–80 meters to the south-east. The area occupied by it is much reduced. During the reconstruction of the city in 1960-1962, the hut was moved to Registon Square for the second time.

Mahmud Sultan, who was martyred in 1504, was first buried in that gravestone. In 1509, the body of the mother of Muhammad Shaybani was brought from Bukhara by Aq Kozi Begim and buried. In 1510 Muhammad Shaibani himself, in 1511 Mahdi, Hamza and Abulkhair Sultans, in 1514 Muhammad Temur Sultan, in 1526 Yadgor Sultan, in 1530 Mrs Shah Sultan, in 1535 Mrs Shahribunu, in 1545 Sultan Qutlugh Muhammad, In 1586, Sultan Suyunch Muhammad and other Shaybani sultans and queens were buried.

Shaybani's hut is included in the national list of immovable property objects of the material and cultural heritage of Uzbekistan - under state protection.

== Literature ==
- Abu Tohirxoja Samarqandiy (2009). Samariya (Samarqand mozorlari zikri) [Samaria (Mention of the Tombs of Samarkand)] (in Uzbek). Toshkent: Yangi asr avlodi. ISBN 978-9943-08-382-0.
- Muqimov, Z. (2007). Shayboniylar davlati va huquqi (Tarixiy-huquqiy tadqiqot). Toshkent: Adolat.
