= Soltaniyeh =

City in Zanjan province, Iran

Soltaniyeh Persian: سلطانيه
- City
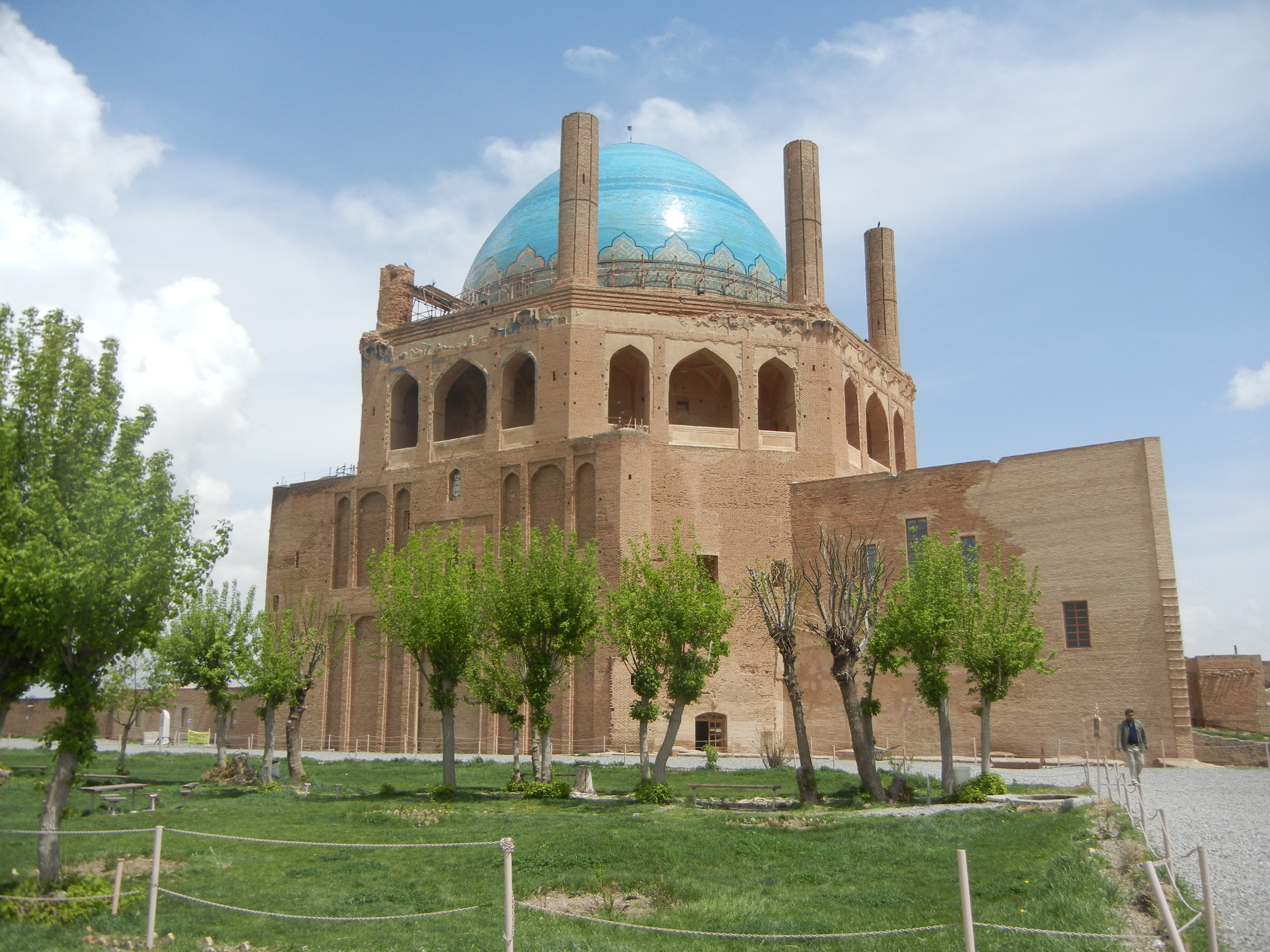
- Dome of Soltaniyeh

- Location within Iran
- Coordinates: 36°26′03″N 48°47′40″E
- Country: Iran
- Province: Zanjan
- County: Soltaniyeh
- District: Central
- Elevation: 1,784 m (5,853 ft)

Population (2016)
  - Total: 7,638
- Time zone: UTC+3:30 (IRST)

Soltaniyeh (Persian: سلطانيه) (Note: Also romanized as Solţāneyyeh and Solţānīyeh; also known as Sa‘īdīyeh, Sultaniye, and Sultānīyeh) is a city in the Central District of Soltaniyeh County, Zanjan province, Iran, serving as capital of both the county and the district.

== History ==
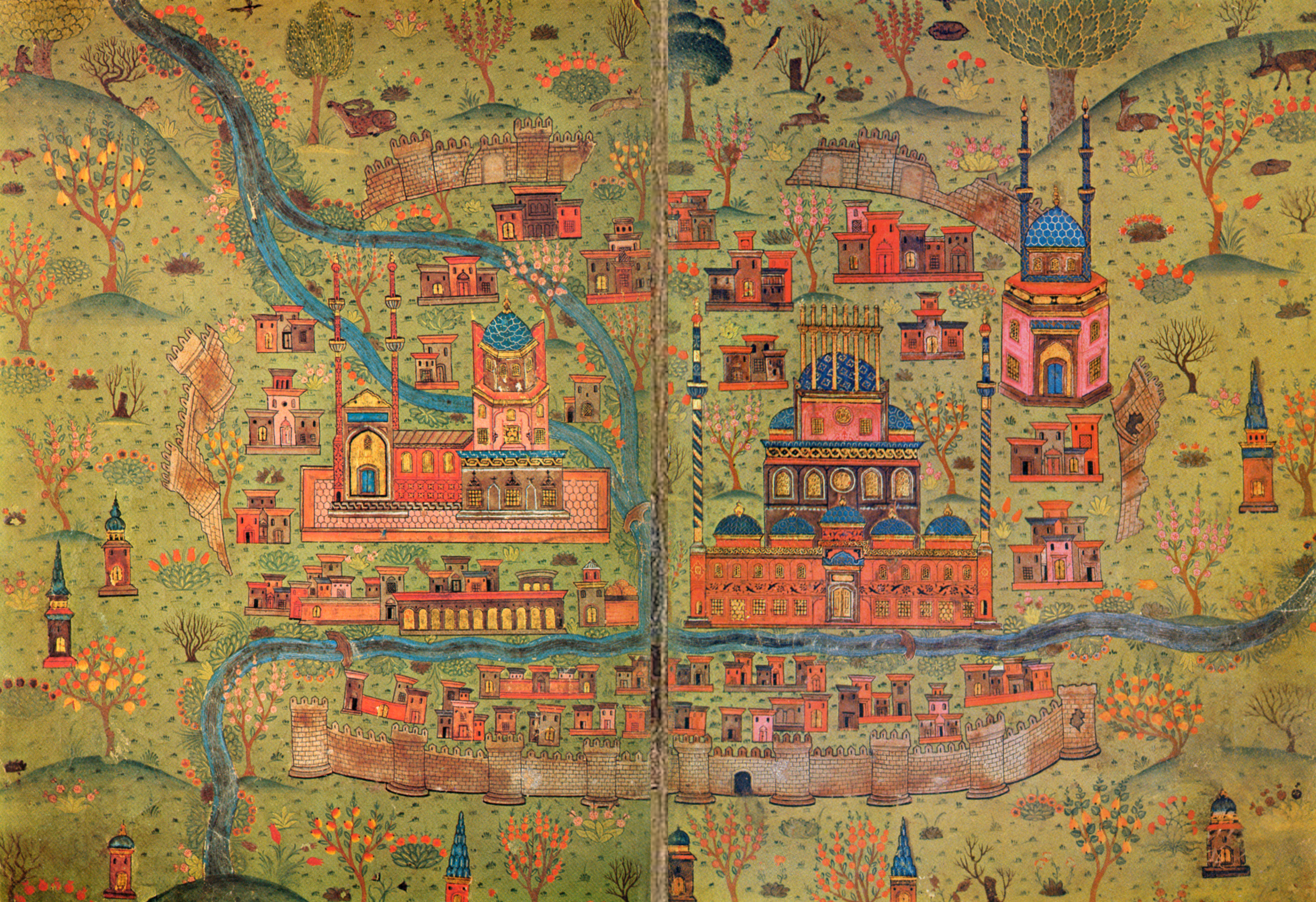
Soltaniyeh map by Matrakçı Nasuh, circa 1550

Soltaniyeh, located some 240 kilometres (150 mi) to the north-west of Tehran, was built as the capital of Mongol Ilkhanid rulers of Iran in the 14th century. Its name which refers to the Islamic ruler title sultan translates loosely as "the Regal". Soltaniyeh was visited by Ruy González de Clavijo, who reported that the city was a hub of silk exportation.

In 2005, UNESCO listed Soltaniyeh as one of the World Heritage Sites. The road from Zanjan to Soltaniyeh extends until it reaches to the Katale khor cave.

William Dalrymple notes that Öljaitü intended Soltaniyeh to be "the largest and most magnificent city in the world" but that it "died with him" and is now "a deserted, crumbling spread of ruins."

== Demographics ==
=== Population ===
At the time of the 2006 National Census, the city's population was 5,864 in 1,649 households, when it was capital of the former Soltaniyeh District of Abhar County. The following census in 2011 counted 7,116 people in 2,013 households. The 2016 census measured the population of the city as 7,638 people in 2,319 households, by which time the district had been separated from the county in the establishment of Soltaniyeh County. Soltaniyeh was transferred to the new Central District as the county's capital.

== Ecclesiastical history ==
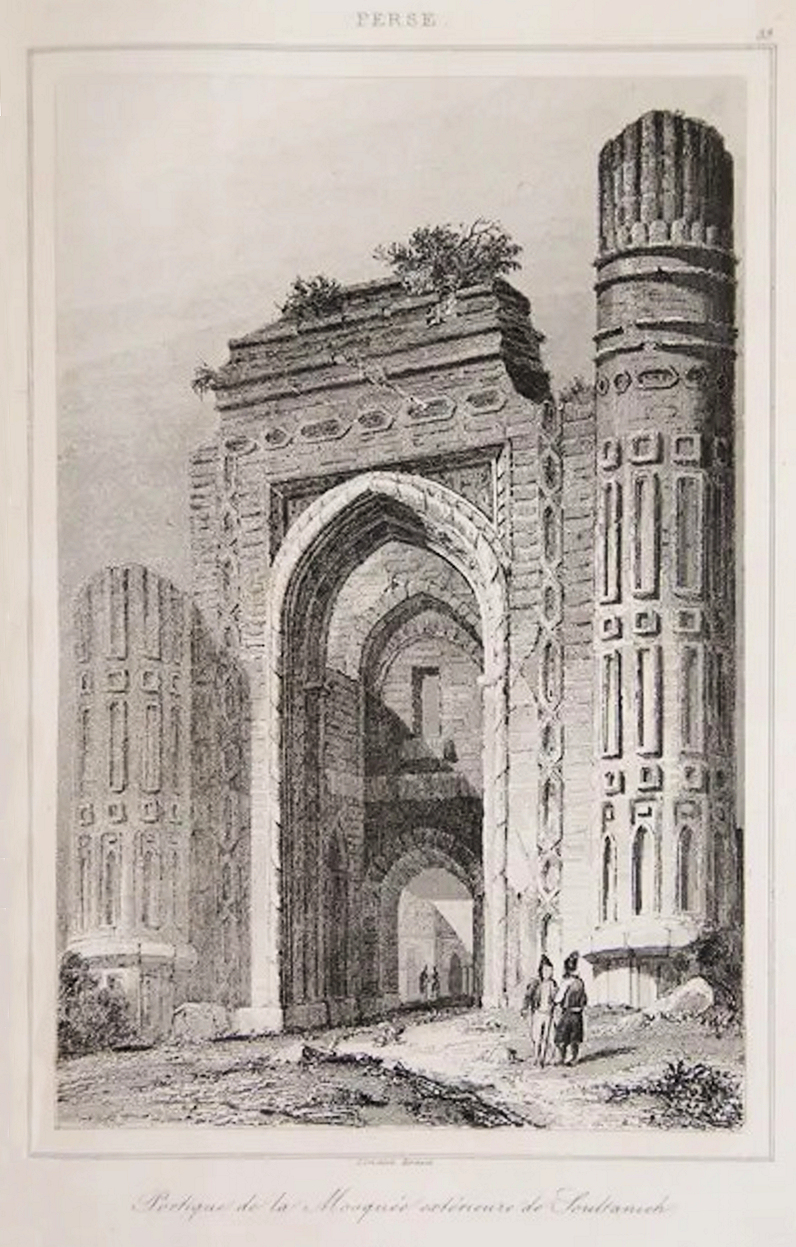
Sultaniyya, Friday Mosque, built by Uljaytu. A possible prototype of the Bibi-Khanym Mosque. François Préault in 1808.

On 1 April 1318, due to the progress of the Persian missions of the Dominican and Franciscan orders, pope John XXII established the archdiocese of Soltania and separated it from the archdiocese of Khanbalik. In 1329, the Latin Diocese of Samarcanda became its suffragan for the Chagatai Khanate, at least until Tamerlane (founder of the Timurids) swept its see Samarkand. The archdiocese was suppressed as residential see around 1450.

=== Residential archbishops ===
Metropolitan Archbishops of Soltania

- Francesco da Perugia, Dominican Order O.P. (1318.08.01 – ?)
- Guillaume Adam, O.P. (1322.10.06 – 1324.10.26); previously Archbishop of Smirna (Smyrna) (Asian Turkey, now İzmir) (1318 – 1322.10.06); later Metropolitan Archbishop of Bar (Montenegro) (1324.10.26 – death 1341)
- Giovanni di Cori, O.P. (1329.08.09 – ?)
- Guglielmo, O.P. (? – ?)
- Giovanni di Piacenza, O.P. (1349.01.09 – ?)
- Tommaso, O.P. (1368.02.28 – ?)
- Domenico Manfredi, O.P. (1388.08.18 – ?)
- Giovanni di Gallofonte, O.P. (1398.08.26 – ?)
- Nicolò Roberti (1401.01.24 – ?); previously Bishop of Ferrara (Italy) (1393.02.04 – 1401.01.24)
- Thomas Abaraner, O.P. (1425.12.19 – ?)
- Giovanni, O.P. (1425.12.19 – ?)

=== Titular see ===
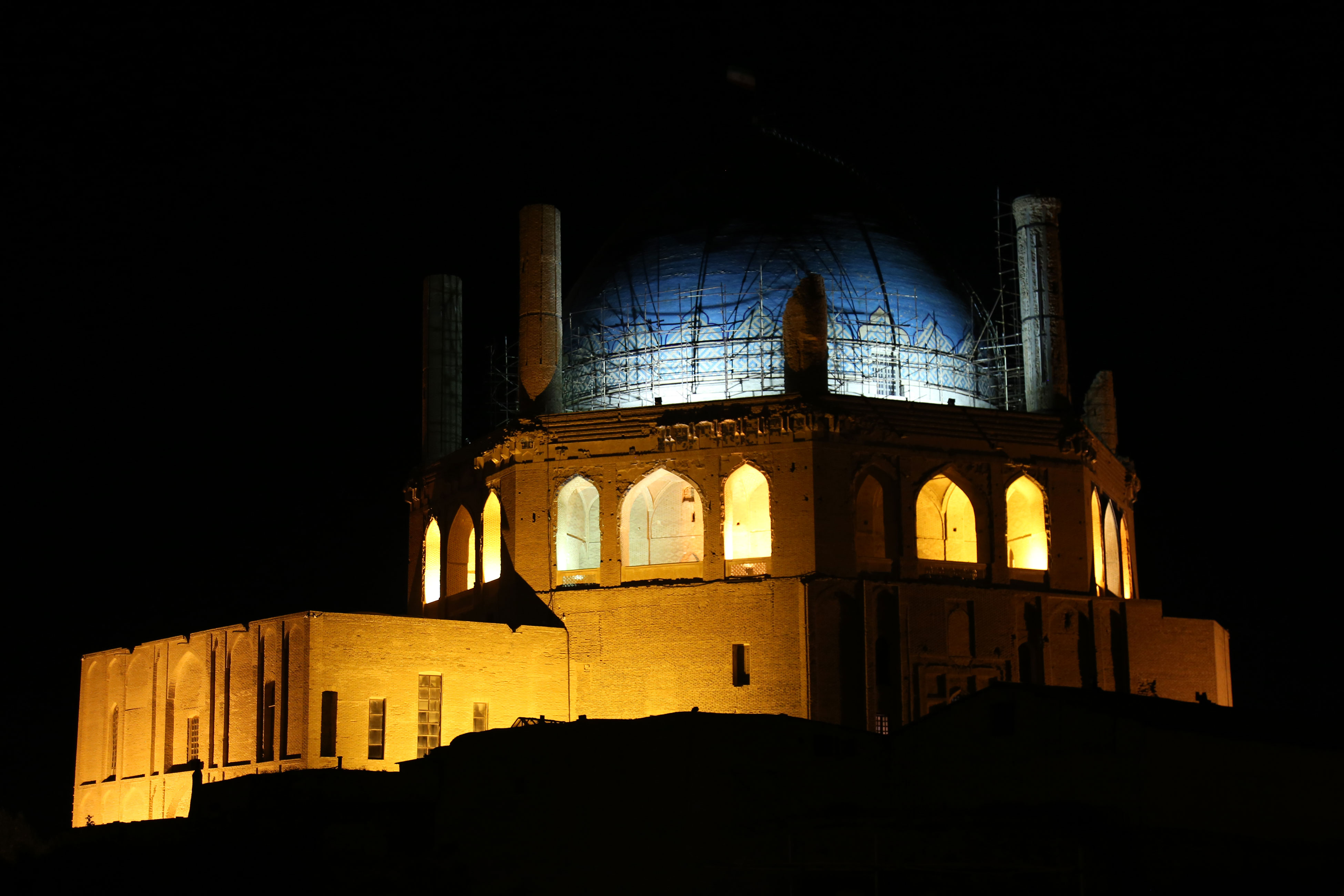
Dome of Soltaniyeh, Zanjan Province, Iran

Transformed at its suppression as residential see in 1450 into a Latin Titular archbishopric, which was itself suppressed in 1926:

- Titular Bishop Francisco Salazar, Friars Minor (O.F.M.) (1548.09.12 – ?)
- Titular Bishop: Bishop-elect Bernardino de Carmona (1551.07.10 – ?)
- Titular Archbishop Alberto Bitter (1922.10.09 – 1926.12.19)

== See also ==
- Dome of Soltaniyeh
- Ab Anbar
- List of Catholic dioceses in Central Asia
- Yakhchal
- Traditional water sources of Persian antiquity
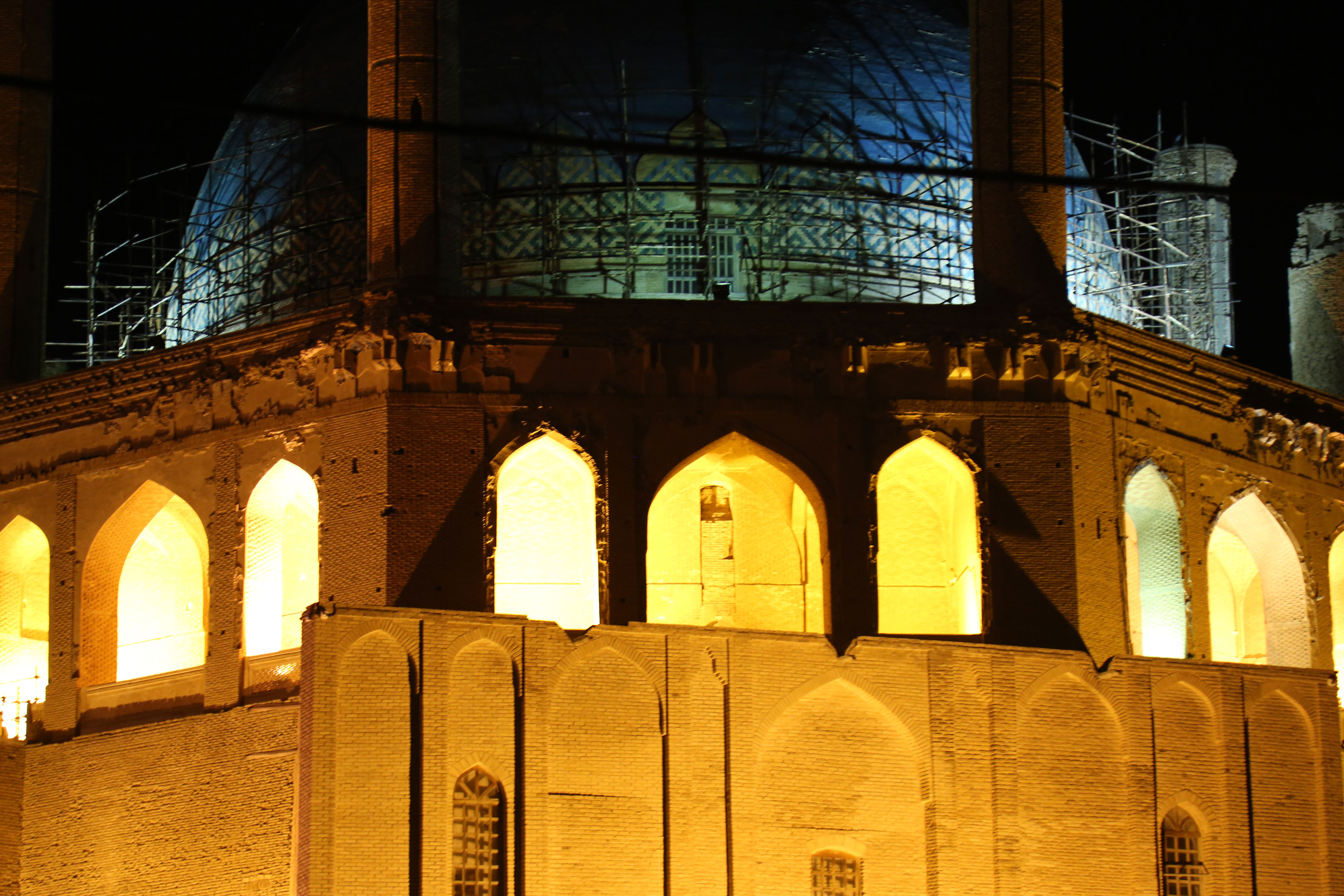
  Dome of Soltaniyeh, Zanjan Province, Iran
- Media related to Soltaniyeh at Wikimedia Commons

== Sources and external links ==
- Official website
- GCatholic, with residential and titular incumbent bio links
- "Video of Soltaniyeh". irannegah.com. Archived from the original on 30 April 2009.
- Farnoush Tehrāni, The Crown of All Domes, in Persian, Jadid Online, 31 December 2009,.
  • Audio slideshow: (6 min 45 sec).

http://sultaniyya.org/

== Notes ==
Preceded by Tabriz	Capital of Ilkhanate (Persia); 1306-1335	Succeeded by -
