= Registan =

Historical center of Samarkand, Uzbekistan

Registan Square
UNESCO World Heritage Site
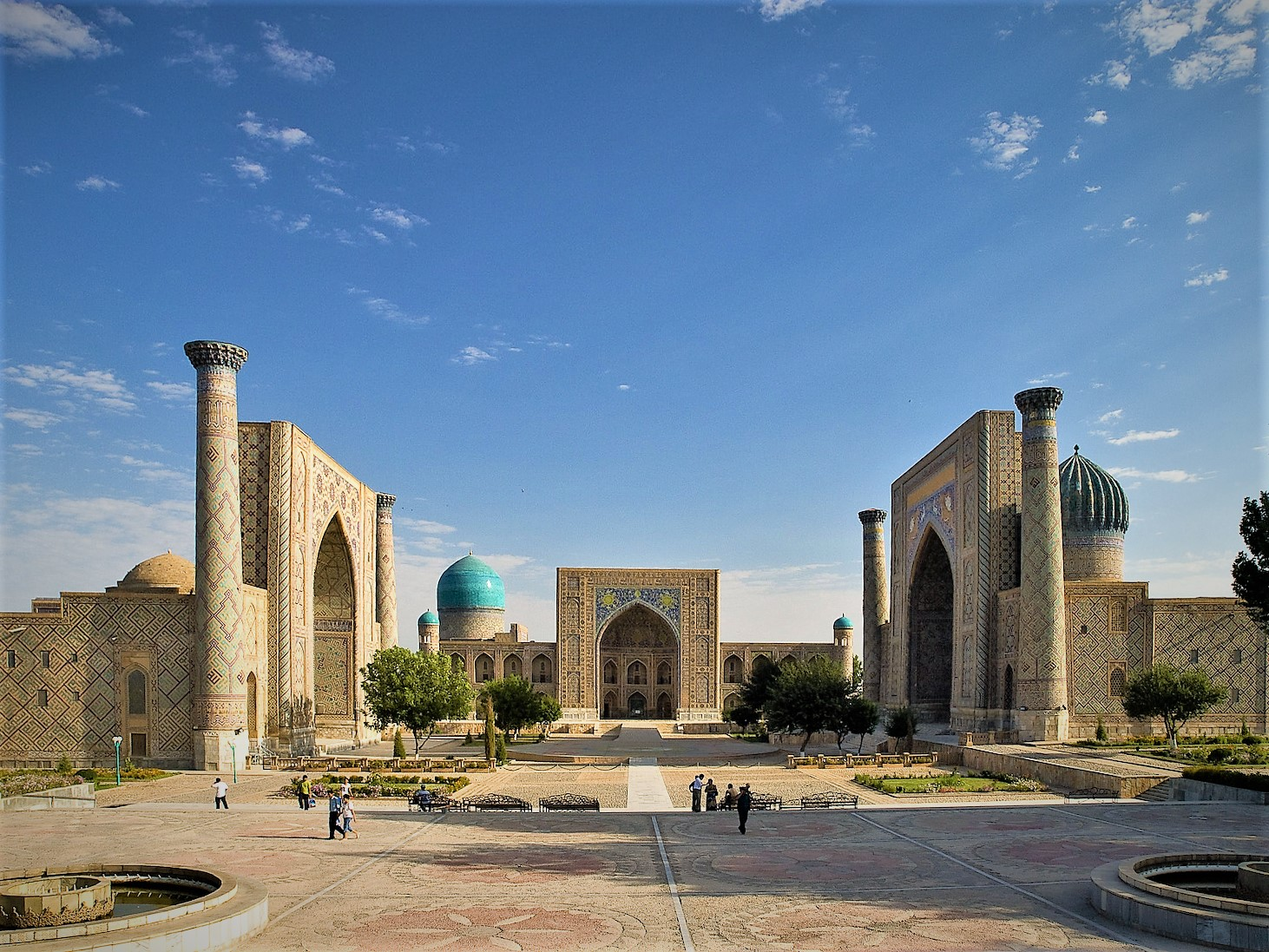
- The Registan and its three madrasas (from left to right): the Ulugh Beg Madrasa, the Tilakari Madrasa and the Sherdar Madrasa

- Location within Uzbekistan
- Location: Samarkand, Uzbekistan
- Criteria: (i)(ii)(iv)
- Reference: 603
- Inscription: 2001 (25th Session)
- Coordinates: 39°39′17″N 66°58′32″E

Registan, (Note: Uzbek: Registon; Chagatai: چؤل; Classical Persian: ریگستان, romanized: Rēgistān, lit. 'place of sand') officially the Registan Square (Uzbek: Registon maydoni) is a historic public square in the city of Samarkand, Uzbekistan. It served as the heart of the Timurid Empire and later as the city's commercial, educational, and ceremonial center. The square is famed for its ensemble of three madrasas (Islamic schools): the Ulugh Beg Madrasa of the Timurid period, the Sherdar Madrasa and the Tilakari Madrasa, built later under the Uzbek Janid dynasty—which together represent some of the finest achievements of Islamic architecture in Central Asia.

Several decades after the Mongol conquest, a Friday mosque was erected on Registan Square in Samarkand, the site that had served as the focal point of the Sarbadar uprising of 1365.

People gathered on the Registan to hear royal proclamations, heralded by blasts on enormous copper pipes called dzharchis — and for public executions. The three madrasas feature distinctive Islamic style with muqarnas. The square was regarded as the hub of the Timurid Renaissance.

== Madrasas ==
The three madrasas of the Registan are the Ulugh Beg Madrasa (1417–1420), the Sherdar Madrasa (1619–1636), and the Tilakari Madrasa (1646–1660). Madrasa is an Arabic term meaning 'school'. The madrasas of the Registan is written on Persian, Chagatai Turkic and Arabic.

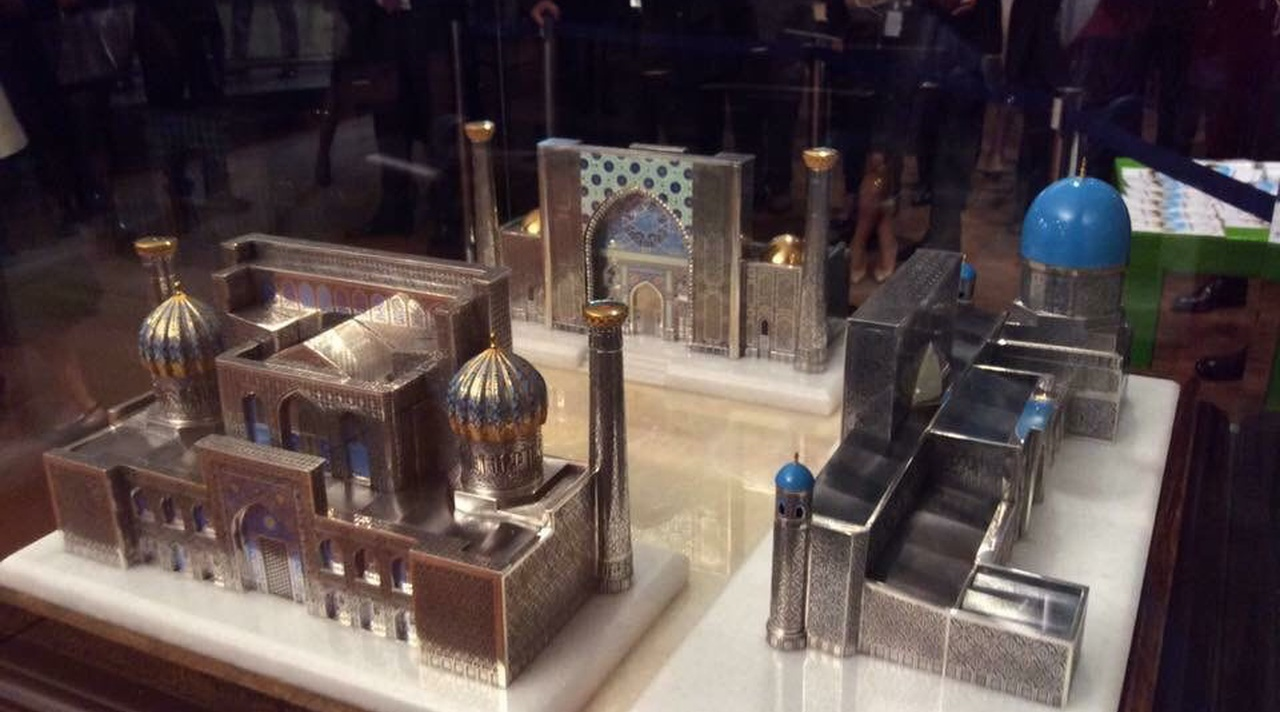
Maquette of the Registan at the UN headquarters in New York City

=== Ulugh Beg Madrasa (1417–1420) ===
The Ulugh Beg Madrasa (Classical Persian: مدرسۀ الغ‌بیگ, romanized: Madrasa-yi Uluġ-Bēg), built by Ulugh Beg during the Timurid Empire era of Timur, has an imposing iwan with a lancet-arch pishtaq or portal facing the square. The corners are flanked by high minarets. The mosaic panel over the iwan's entrance arch is decorated by geometrical stylized ornaments. The square courtyard includes a mosque and lecture rooms, and is fringed by the dormitory cells in which students lived. There are deep galleries along the axes. Originally the Ulugh Beg Madrasa was a two-storied building with four domed darskhonas (lecture rooms) at the corners.

The Ulugh Beg Madrasa was one of the best clergy universities of the Muslim Orient in the 15th century CE. Jami, the great Persian poet, scholar, mystic, scientist and philosopher studied at the madrasa. Ulugh Beg himself gave lectures there. During Ulugh Beg's government the madrasa was a centre of learning.

=== Sherdar Madrasa (1619–1636) ===
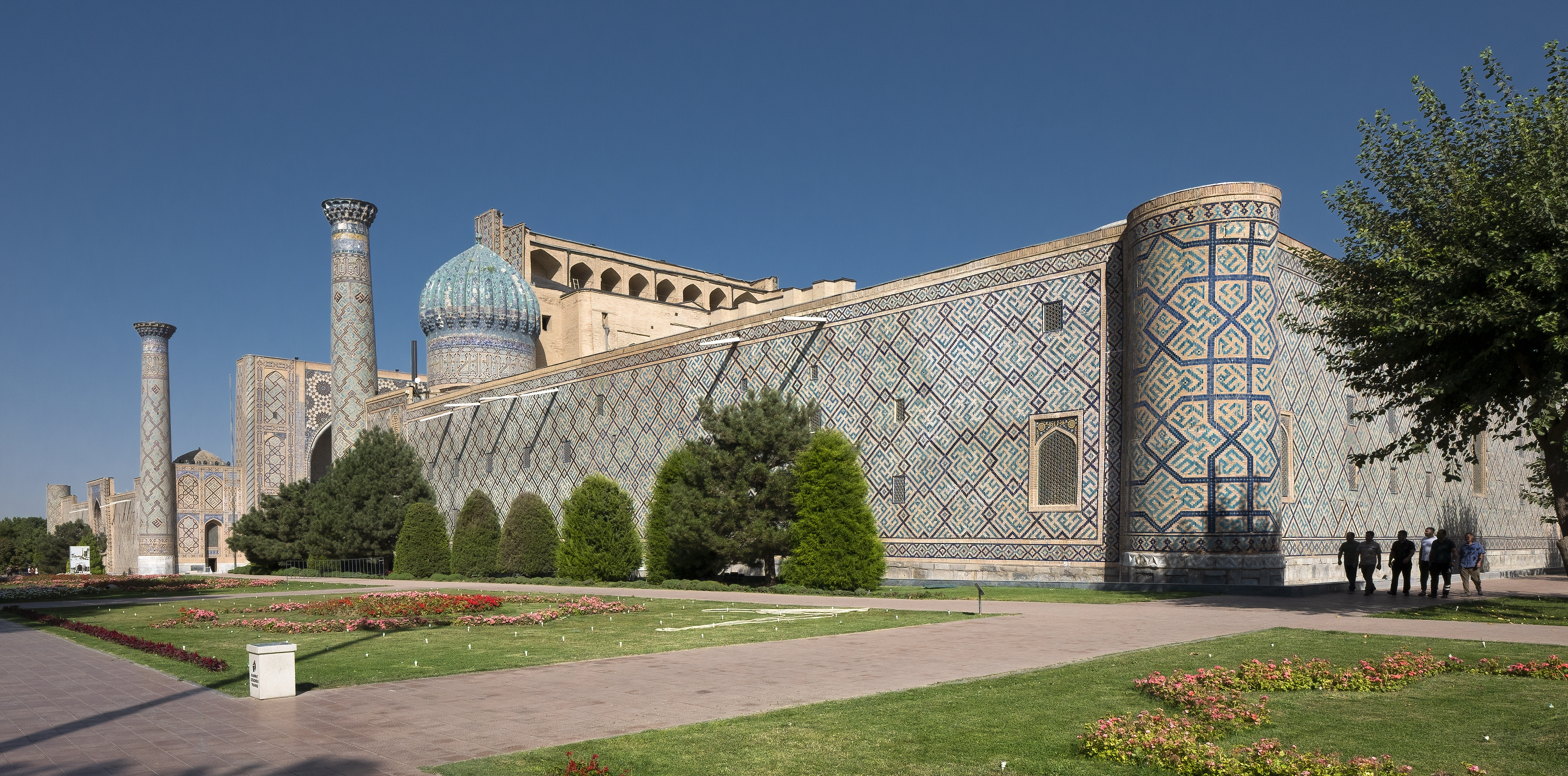
Side view of the Sherdar Madrasa and the Ulugh Beg Madrasa (left)

The construction of the Sherdar Madrasa (Classical Persian: مدرسۀ شیردار, romanized: Madrasa-yi Šērdār, lit. 'the Lion-Bearing Madrasa') was ordered in the 17th century by the Uzbek ruler of Samarkand Yalangtoʻsh Bakhodir. The tiger mosaics with a rising sun on their back are especially interesting for their depiction of living beings and use of Turko-Persian motifs. The name of the madrasa comes from the patterns on the portal of the building as the word "Sher" means tiger.

=== Tillakori Madrasa (1646–1660) ===
Ten years later the Tilakari Madrasa (Classical Persian: مدرسۀ طلاکاری, romanized: Madrasa-yi Ṭilākārī, lit. 'the Madrasa of Gilding, the Gilded Madrasa') was built. It was not only a residential college for students, but also played the role of grand masjid (mosque). It has a two-storied main facade and a vast courtyard fringed by dormitory cells, with four galleries along the axes. The mosque building (see picture) is situated in the western section of the courtyard. The main hall of the mosque is abundantly gilded.

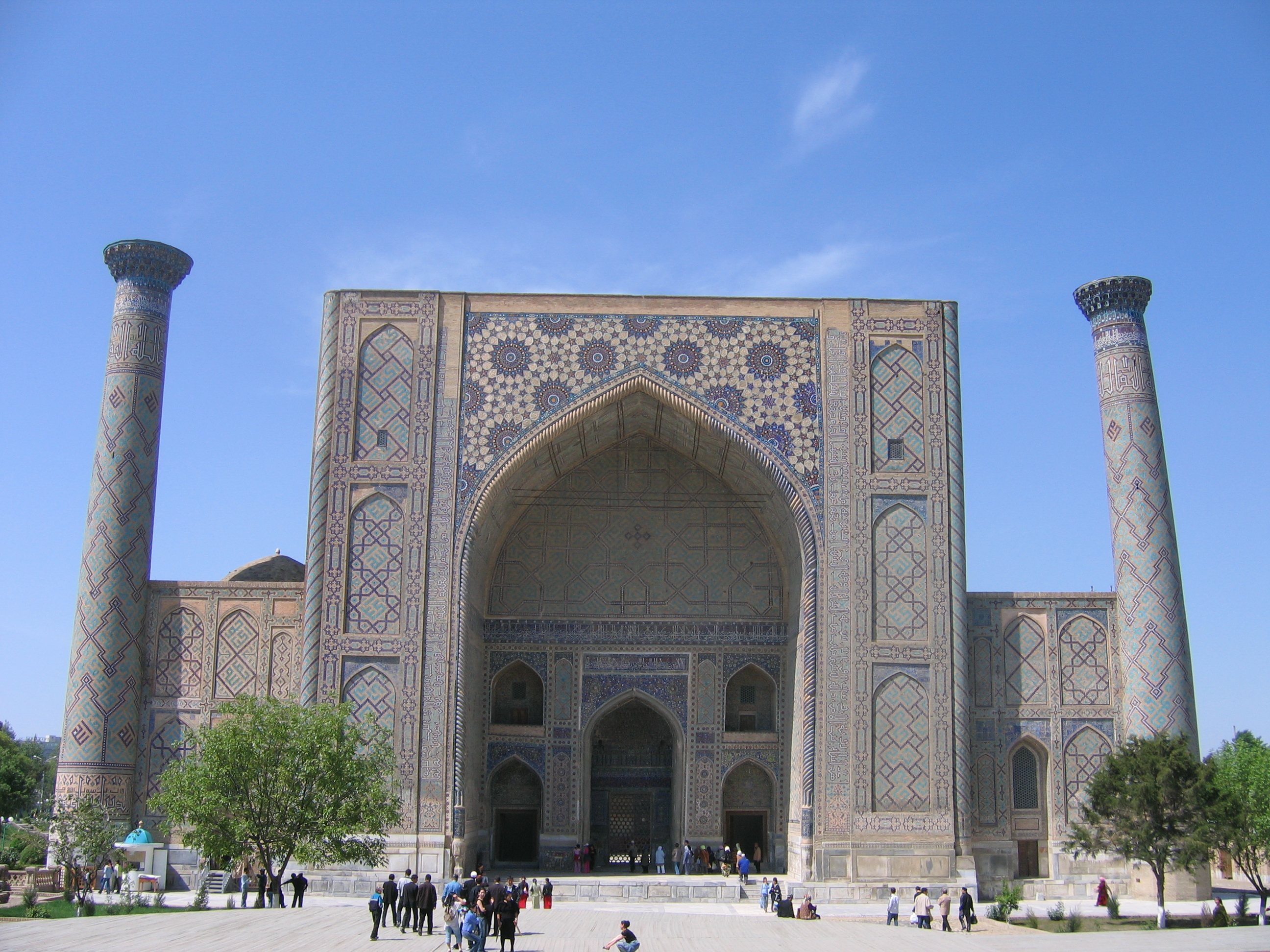
The Ulugh Beg Madrasa

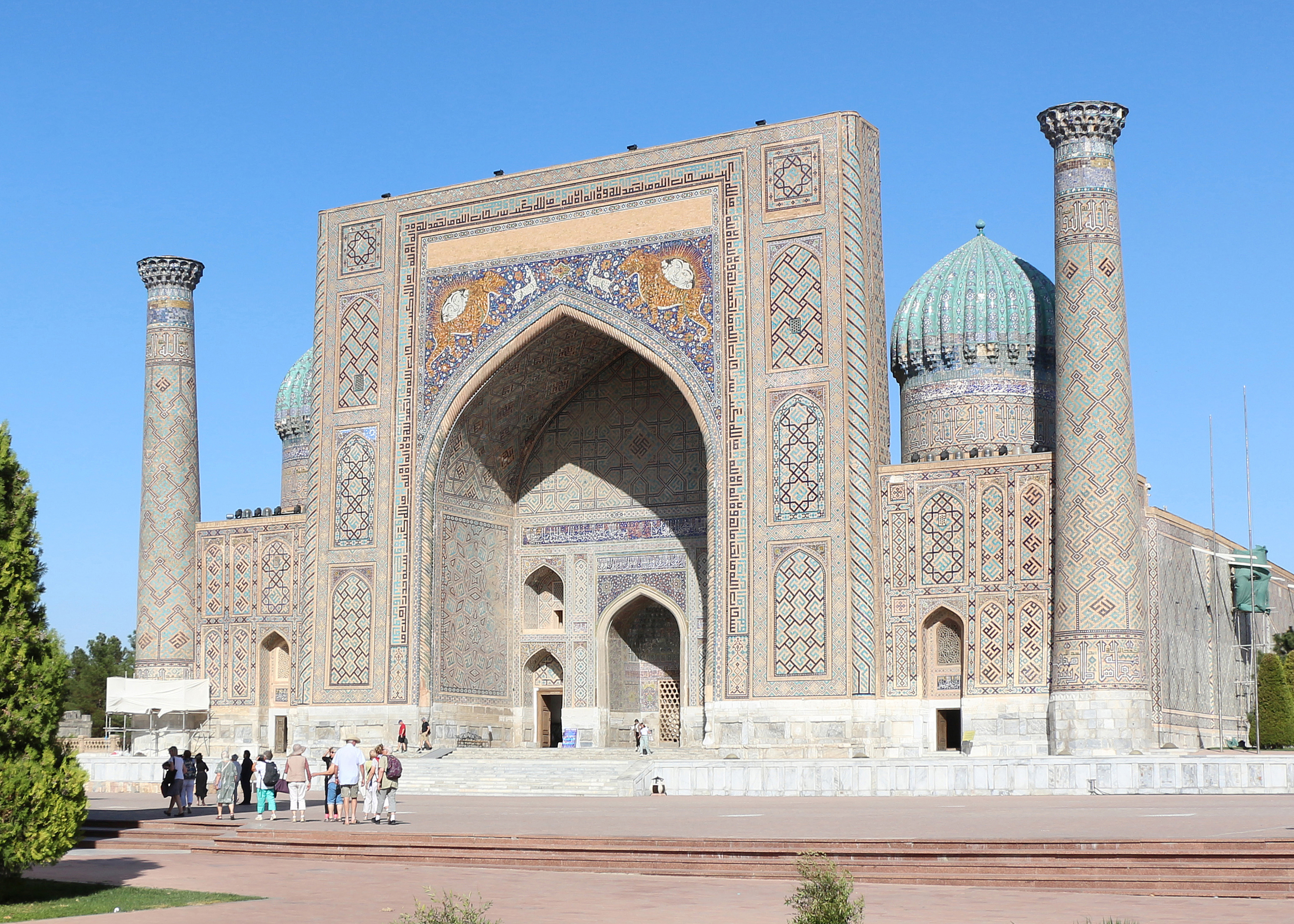
The Sherdar Madrasa

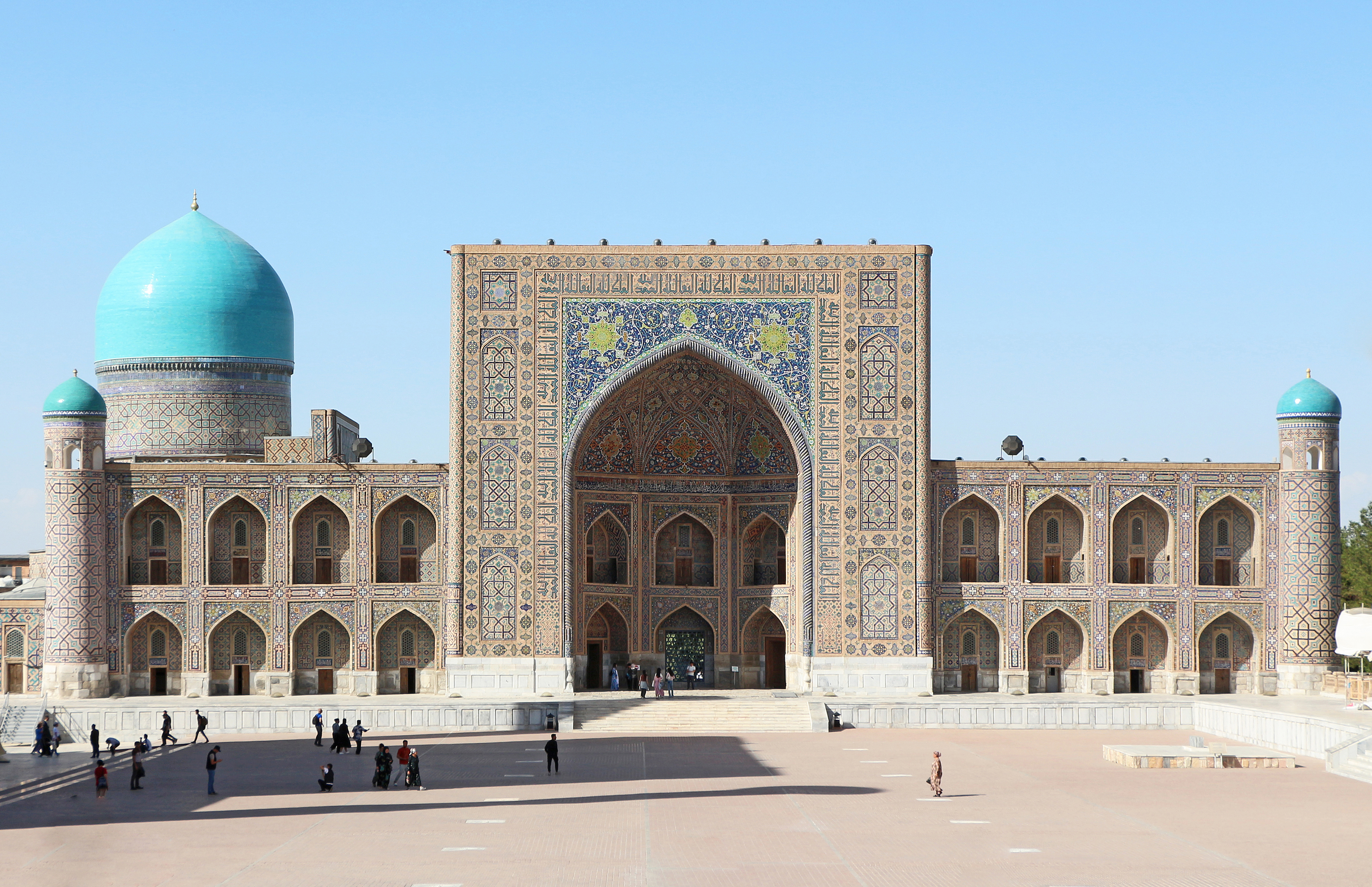
The Tilakari Madrasa

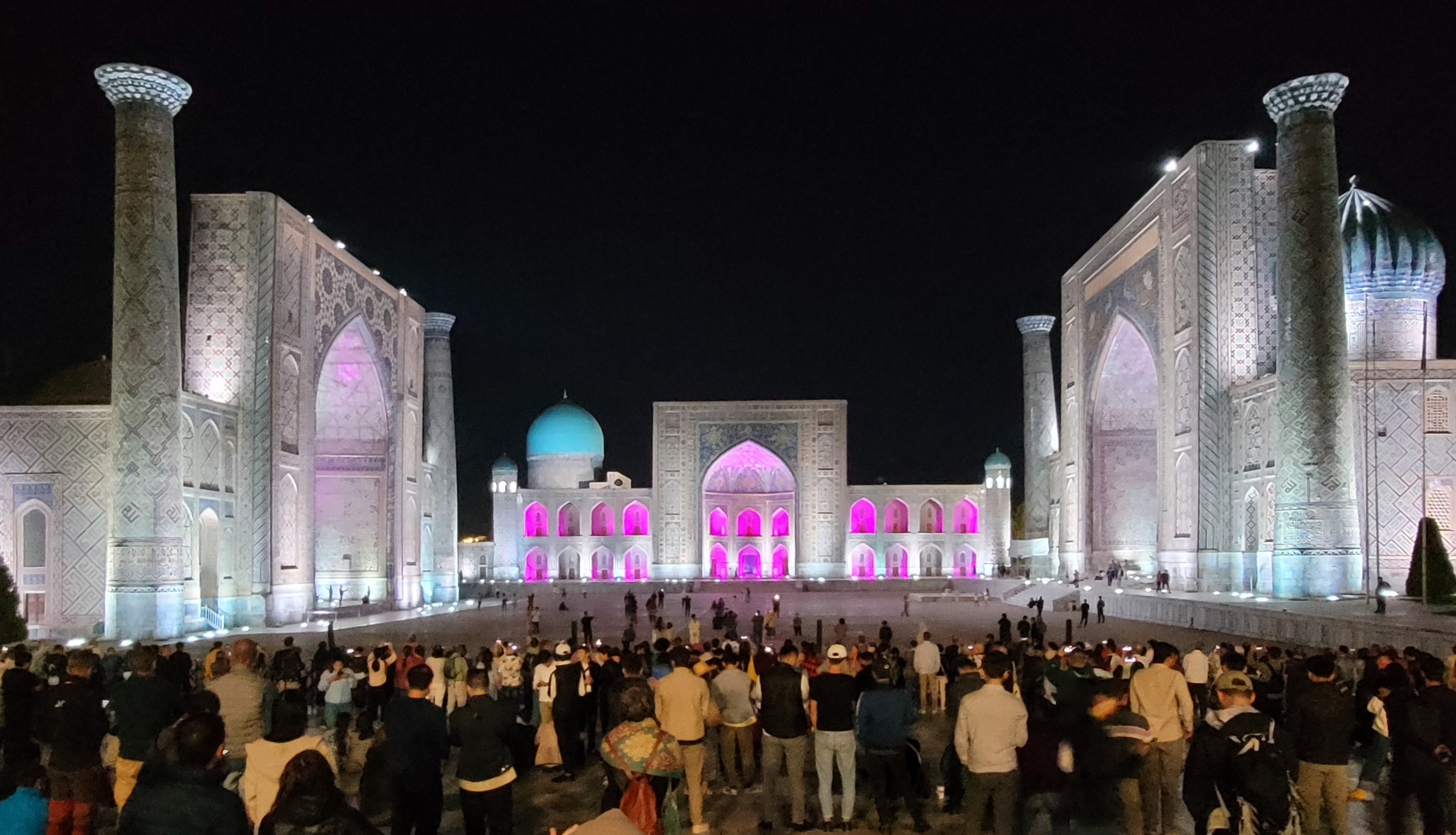
The Registan at night

== Other buildings ==
=== Mausoleum of Shaybanids ===
To the east of the Tilakari Madrasa, the mausoleum of Shaybanids (16th century) is located (see picture). The real founder of Shaybanid power was Muhammad Shaybani—grandson of Abu'l-Khayr Khan. In 1500, with the backing of the Chagatai Khanate, then based in Tashkent, Muhammad Shaybani conquered Samarkand and Bukhara from their last Timurid rulers. The founder of the dynasty then turned on his benefactors and in 1503 took old Tashkent. He captured Khiva in 1506 and in 1507 he swooped down on Merv, eastern Persia, and western Afghanistan. The Shaybanids stopped the advance of the Safavids, who in 1502 had defeated the Aq Qoyunlus. Muhammad Shaybani was a leader of nomadic Uzbek tribes. During the ensuing years they substantially settled down in oases of the Central Asia, Caspian shore, Tian Shan valleys, Russian steppes and Indostan. The last and vast Uzbek invasion of the 15th century CE was the large component of today's Uzbek nation ethnogeny.

=== Chorsu trading dome ===
The trading dome Chorsu (1785) is situated right behind the Sherdar. Chorsu located at southeast of the Registan at the intersection of the cross-roads connecting Samarkand, Tashkent, Bukhara, and Shahrisabz. Chorsu is a word of Persian origin meaning "crossing roads," referring to this famous intersection of busy roadways. The building is old. It has a rather rich centuries-old history. At the moment, it is included in the UNESCO World Heritage List along with the rest of the historical part of the glorious city.

Chorsu was originally a bazaar constructed in the 15th century but was rebuilt in the 18th century, becoming a hat market. The current building was built during the reign of Amir Shahmurad, in 1785. Today, the bazaar which was previously located at Chorsu is nowadays the Siyob Bazaar near the Bibi-Khanym Mosque.

In 2005, ownership of Chorsu was transferred to the Academy of Arts of Uzbekistan. While renovating the building, three meters of dirt were removed from the building revealing the original base construction. Chorsu now serves as an art gallery which offers the work of artists both contemporary and historical. The art of in the Chorsu gallery displays the arts, culture, history, and diversity of the multi-national Uzbek people.

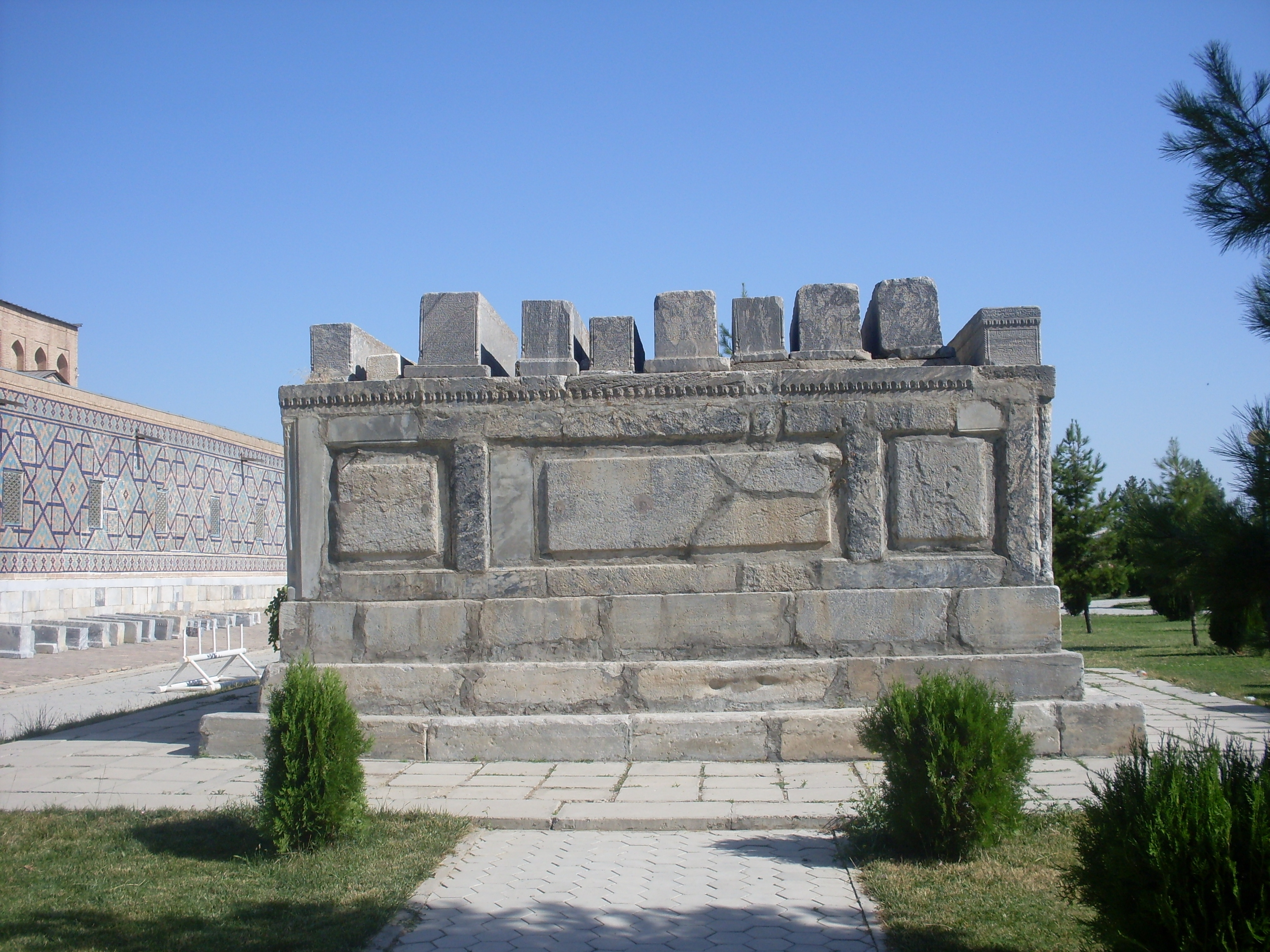
Mausoleum of Shaybanids

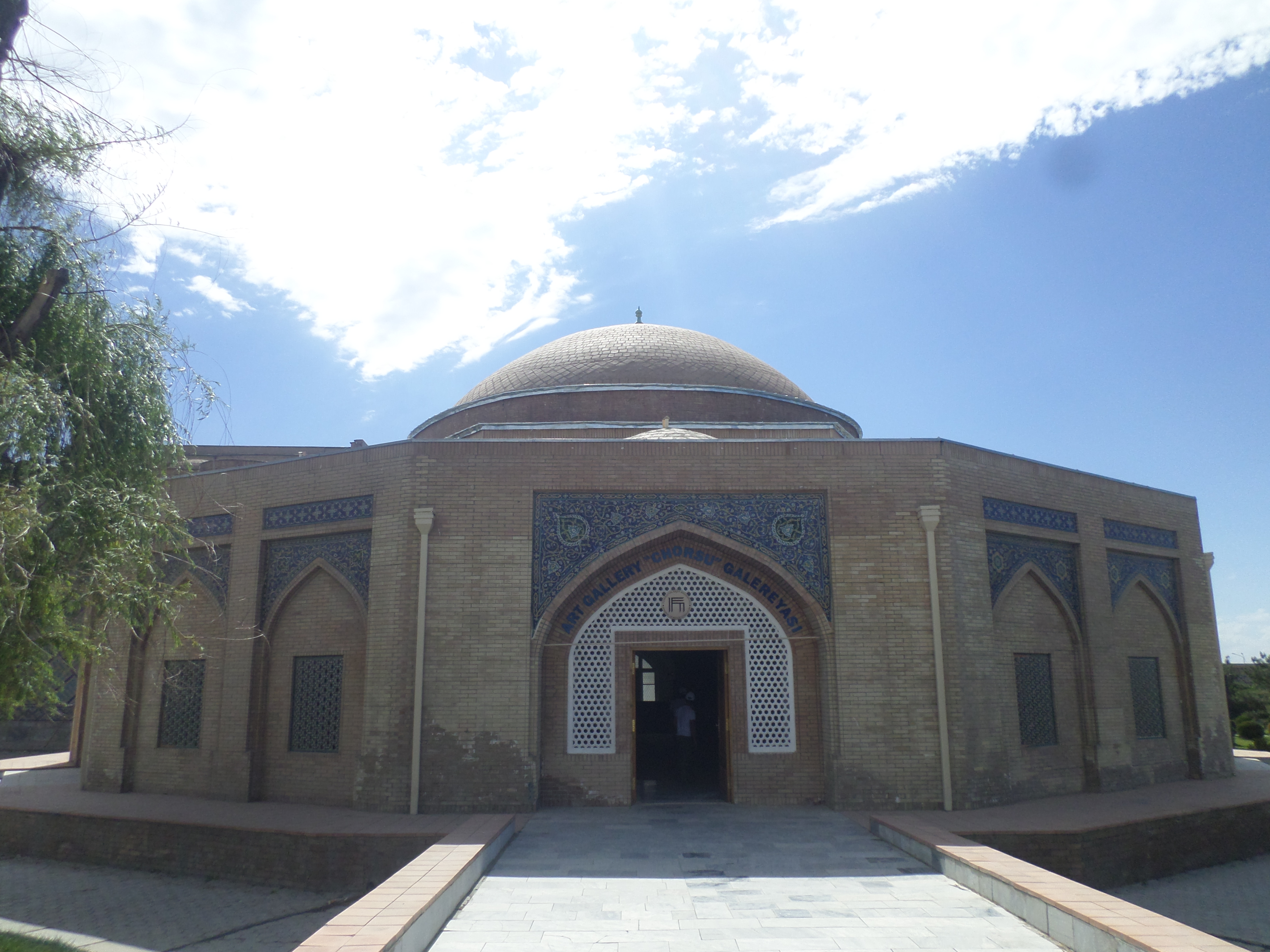
Chorsu trading dome

== See also ==
- Bibi-Khanym Mosque
- Gur-e Amir
- Shah-i-Zinda
- Timurid dynasty
- Tourism in Uzbekistan
- Shayboni's hut (Samarkand)
