= Friday Mosque (Soltaniyeh) =

Former mosque in Soltaniyeh, Zanjan province, Iran

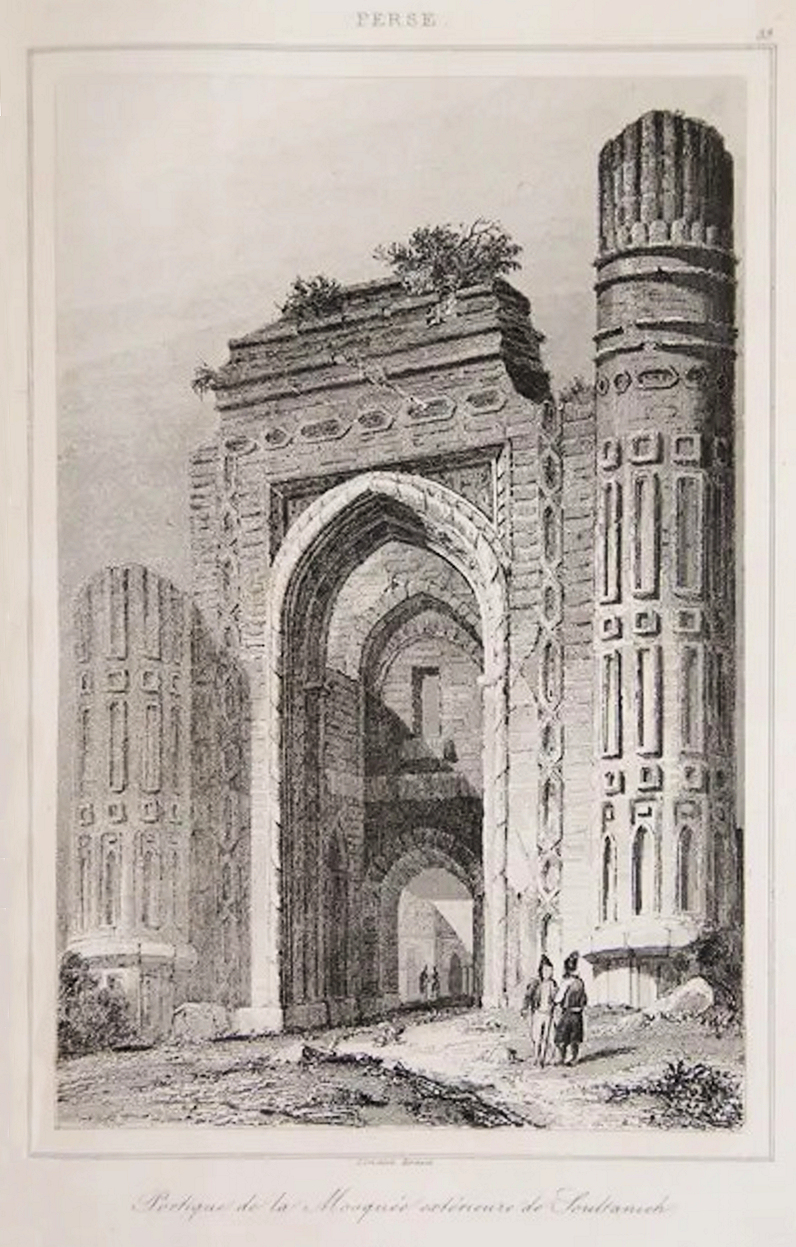
- Etching of the former mosque, by François Préault, 1808

- Location of the former mosque in Iran

Religion
- Affiliation: Islam (former)
- Ecclesiastical or organizational status: Congregational mosque (former)
- Status: Demolished

Location
- Location: Soltaniyeh, Zanjan province
- Country: Iran
- Interactive map of Friday Mosque
- Coordinates: 36°26′07″N 48°47′48″E

Architecture
- Type: Islamic architecture
- Style: Ilkhanid
- Founder: Uljaytu
- Completed: c. 1316 CE

The Friday Mosque of Soltaniyeh (Persian: مسجد جامع سلطانیه) was a former congregational mosque, since demolished, that was located in the city of Soltaniyeh, in the province of Zanjan, Iran. The mosque was built in c. 1316 CE by the Ilkhanid ruler Uljaytu (r.1304–1316)

== Overview ==
It has been suggested that Timur admired the monument, and used it as a prototype for the design of his Bibi-Khanym Mosque.

Nothing remains of the mosque today.

== Gallery ==
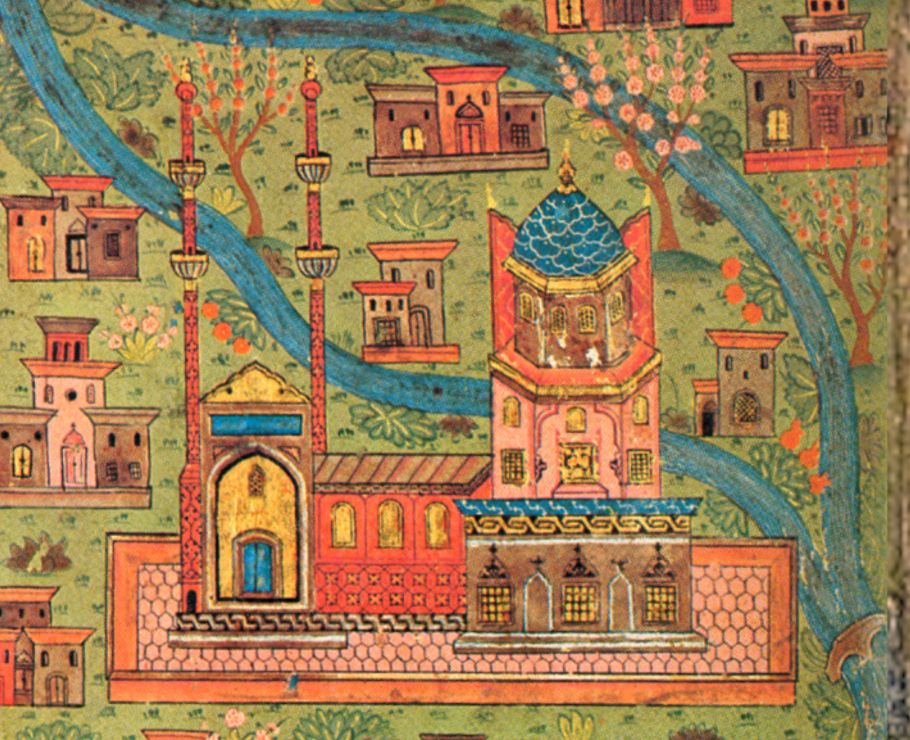
A Matrakçı Nasuh map of Soltaniyeh, showing the mosque, c. 1550

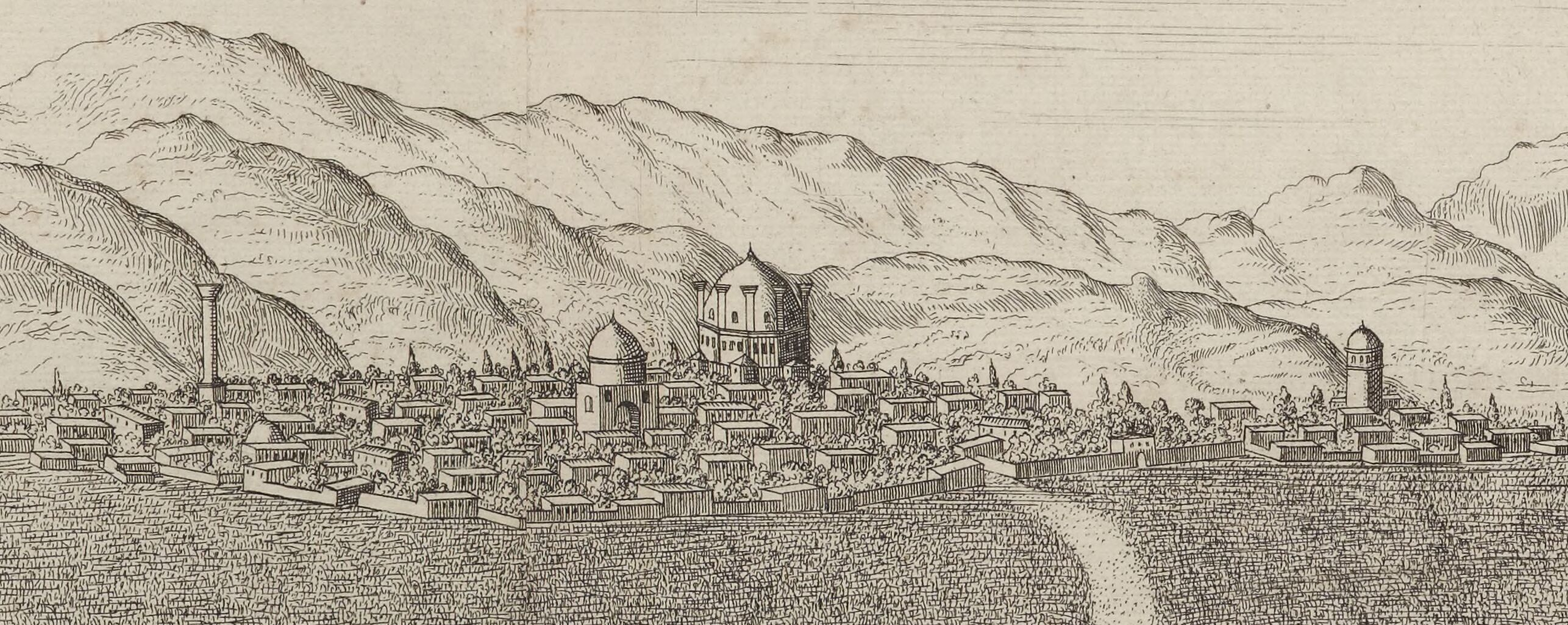
Soltaniye by Jean Chardin, 1673

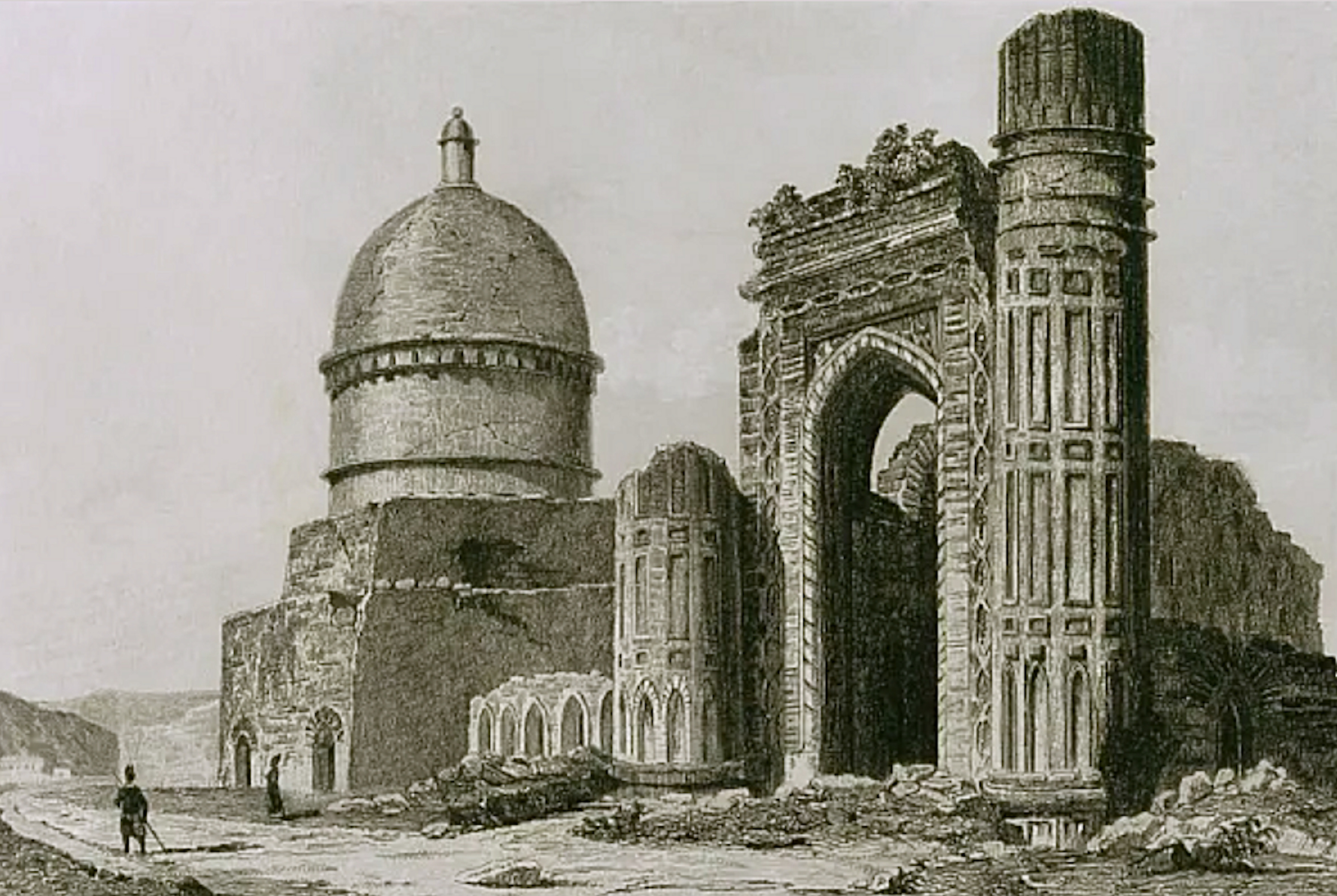
The mosque and mausoleum in 1851

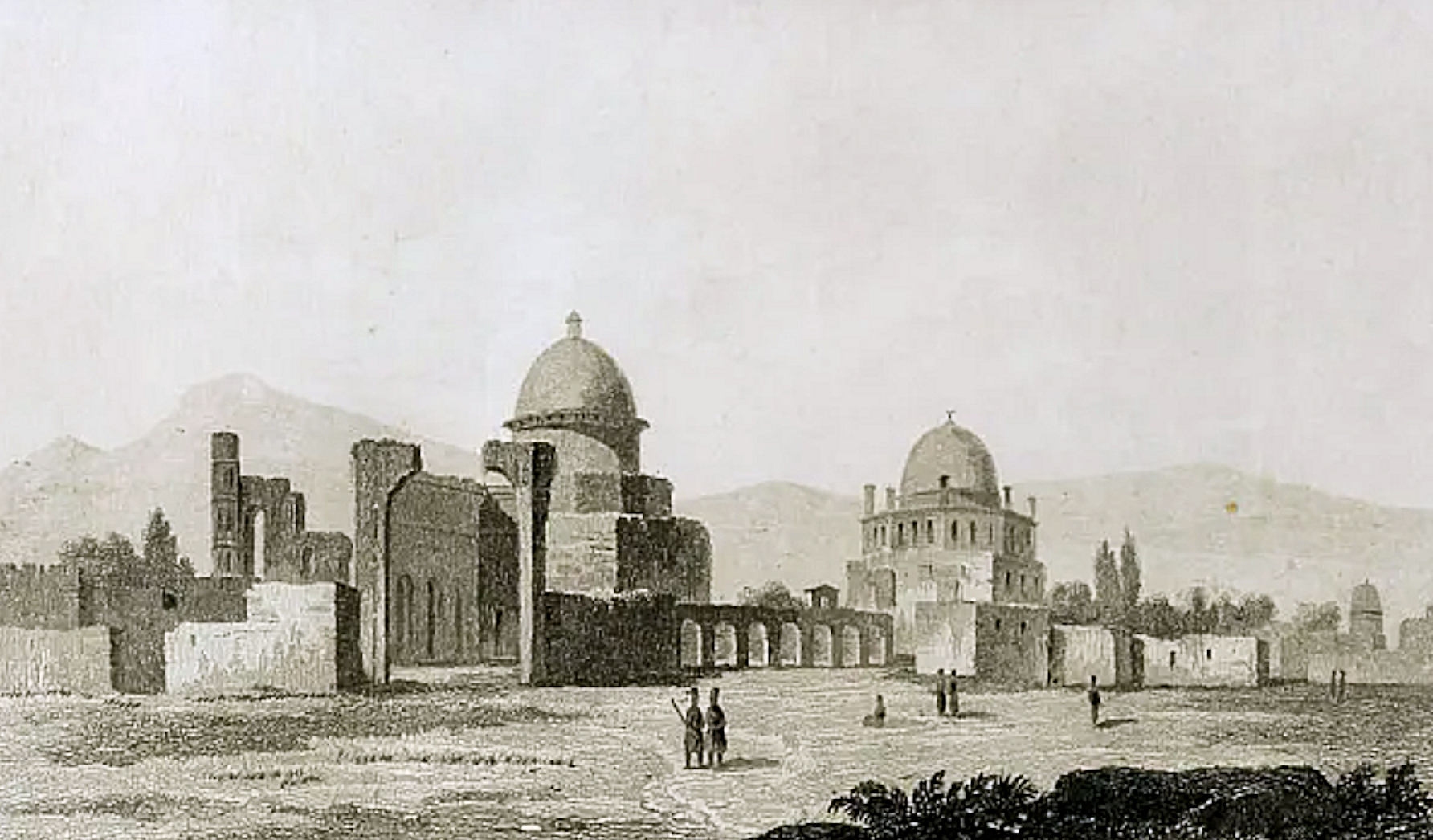
An etching of the mosque and ausoleum in 1841

== See also ==
- List of mosques in Iran
- List of grand mosques
- Islam in Iran
