= Bibi-Khanym Mosque =

Mosque in Samarkand, Uzbekistan

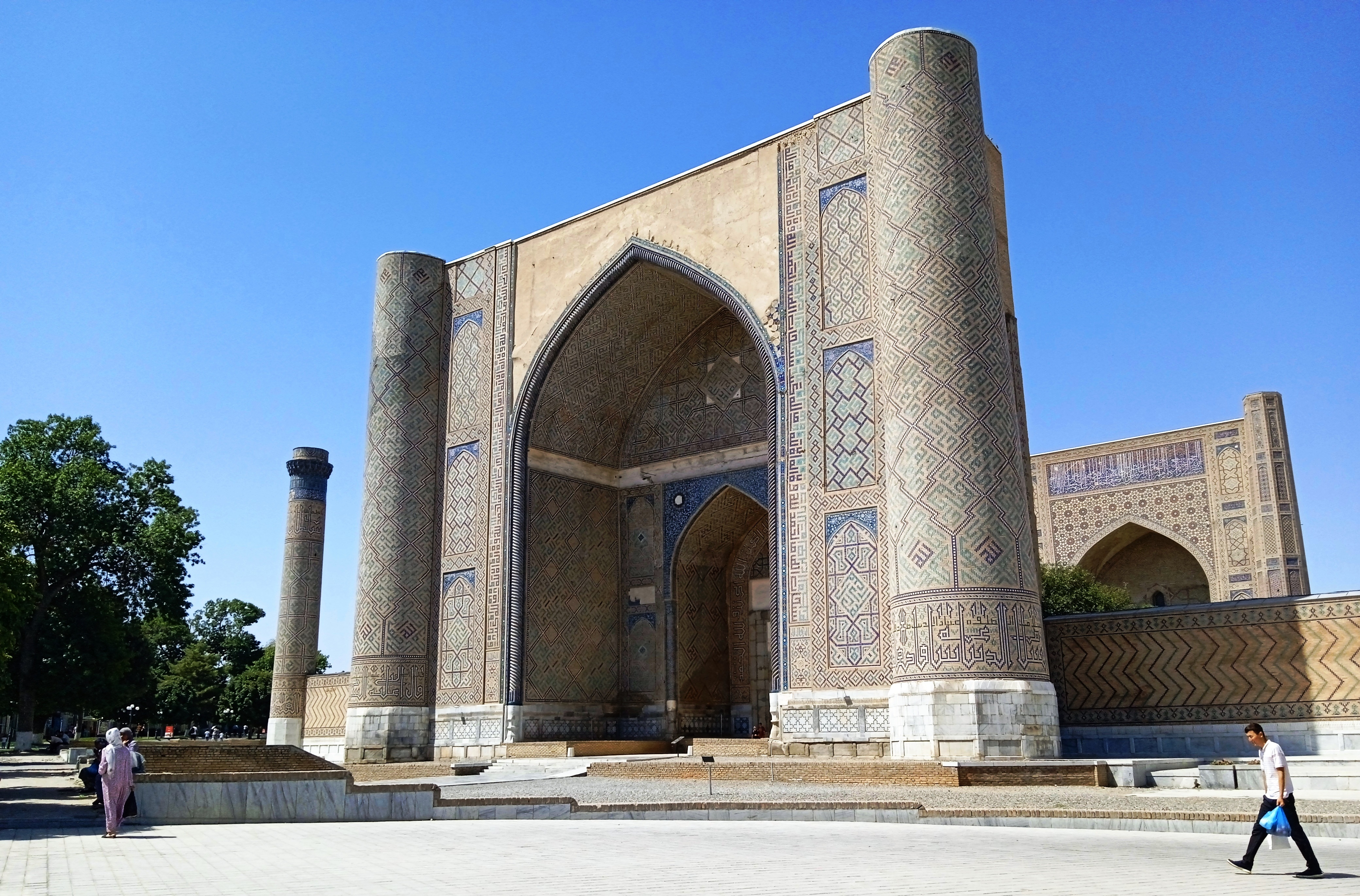

- Location within Uzbekistan

Religion
- Affiliation: Islam

Location
- Location: Samarkand, Uzbekistan
- Coordinates: 39°39′38″N 66°58′45″E

Architecture
- Type: mosque
- Style: Timurid
- Completed: 1404; 622 years ago
- Dome height (outer): 40 m

The Bibi-Khanym Mosque (Uzbek: Bibixonim masjidi; Persian: مسجد بی‌بی خانم; also variously spelled as Khanum, Khanom, Hanum, Hanim) is one of the most important monuments of Samarkand, Uzbekistan. In the 15th century, it was one of the largest and most magnificent mosques in the Islamic world. It is considered a masterpiece of the Timurid Renaissance. By the mid-20th century, only a grandiose ruin of it still survived, but major parts of the mosque were restored during the Soviet period.

== History ==
After his Indian campaign in 1399, Timur (Tamerlane) decided to undertake the construction of a gigantic mosque in his new capital, Samarkand. He may have been inspired by the design of the Friday Mosque in Sultaniyeh, built by Uljaytu (r.1304–1316). When Timur returned from his military campaign in 1404 the mosque was almost completed. However, Timur was not happy with the progress of construction, and immediately had various changes made, especially on the main cupola.

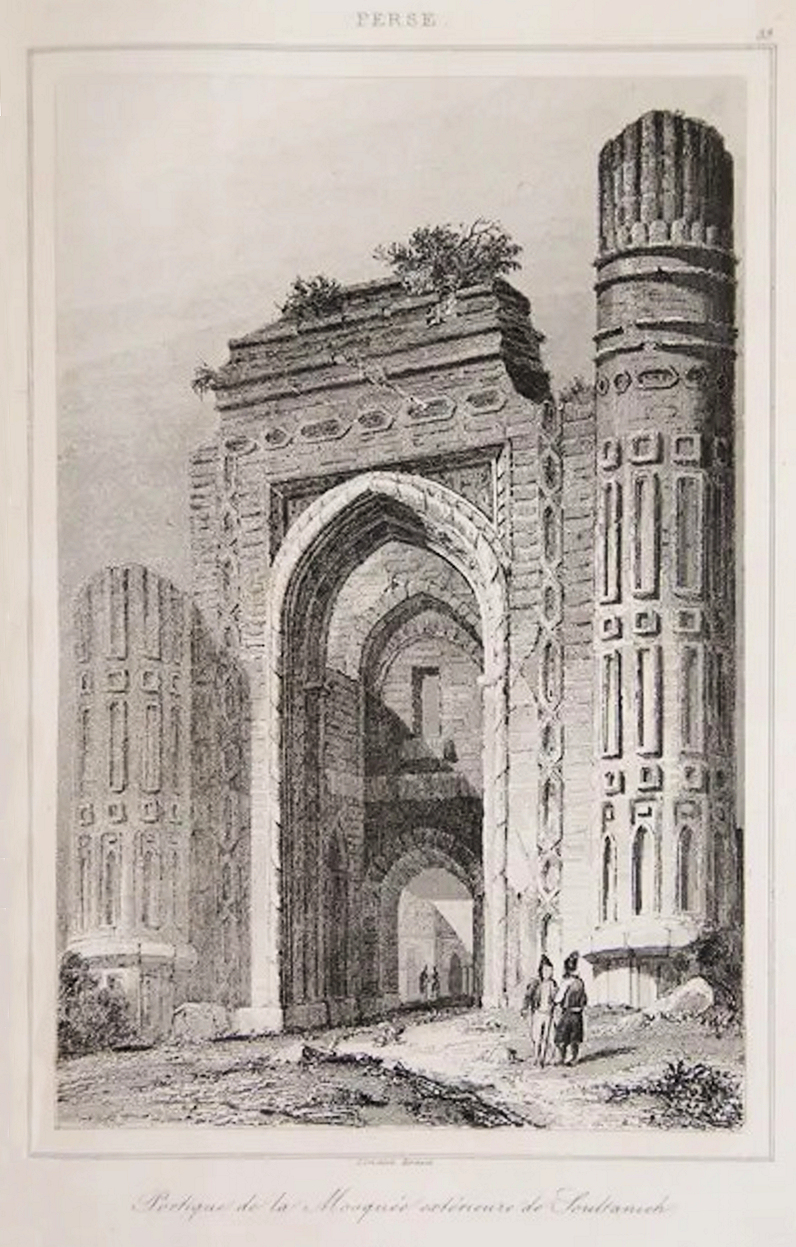
Friday Mosque in Sultaniyeh, built a century earlier by Uljaytu (r.1304–1316). A possible prototype of the Bibi-Khanym Mosque. François Préault in 1808.

From the beginning of the construction, problems of structural integrity of the structure revealed themselves. Various reconstructions and reinforcements were undertaken in order to save the mosque. However, after just a few years, the first bricks had begun to fall out of the huge dome over the mihrab. The scale of Timur's plans pushed the building techniques of the time to their limit, and the building's integrity was not helped by the rushed nature of its construction.

Timur named the mosque after his wife, Saray Mulk Khanum. However, the Bibi Khanym Mosque was actually commissioned by Saray Mulk Khanum herself.

In the late 16th century, the Abdullah Khan II (Abdollah Khan Ozbeg) (1533/4-1598), the last Shaybanid Dynasty Khan of Bukhara, cancelled all restoration works in Bibi-Khanym Mosque. After that, the mosque slowly deteriorated and became a ruins gnawed at by the wind, weather, and earthquakes. The inner arch of the portal construction finally collapsed in an earthquake in 1897. During the centuries the ruins were plundered by the inhabitants of Samarkand in search of building material, especially the brick of the masonry galleries along with the marble columns.

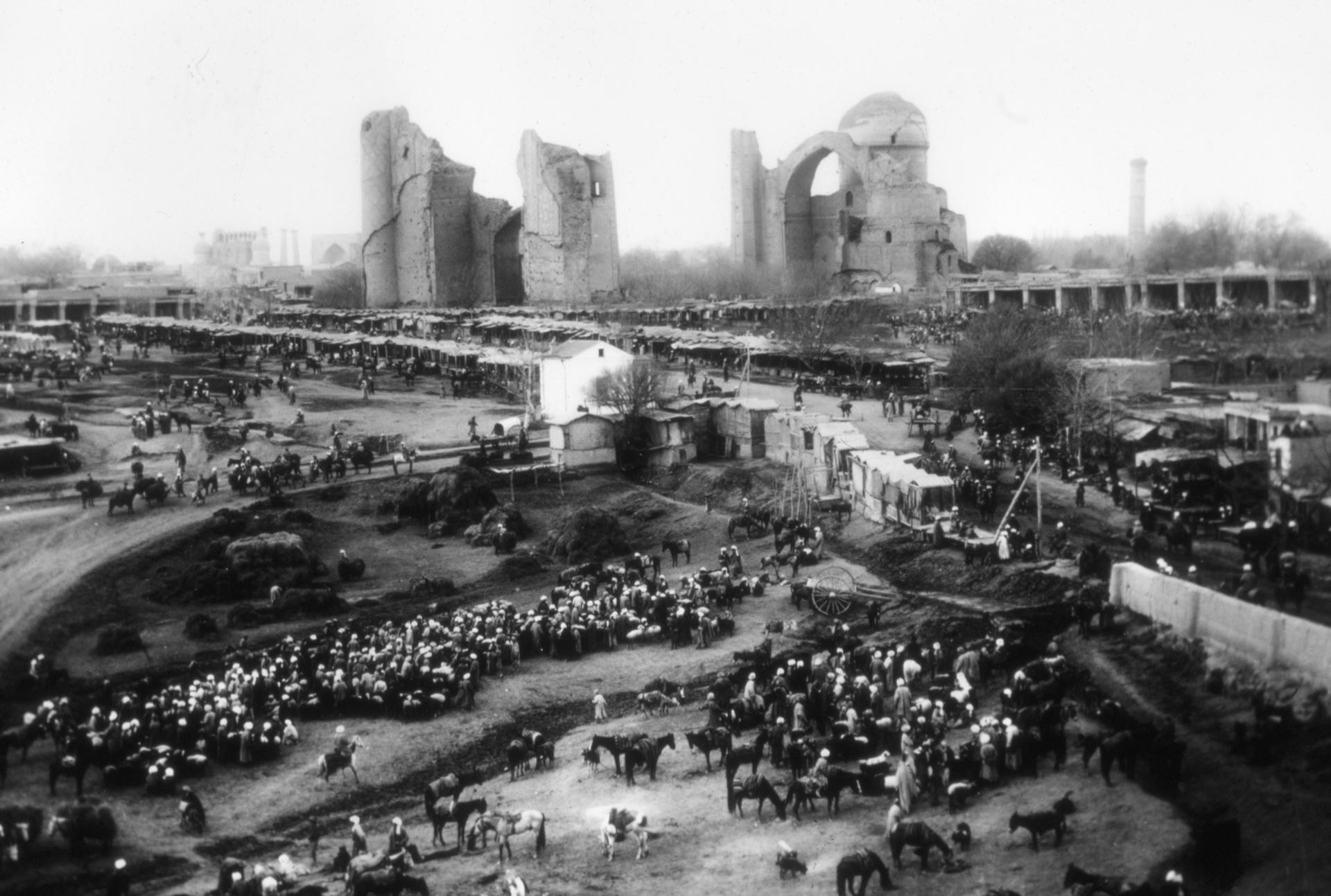
The Bibi-Khanym Mosque between 1890 and 1896

A first basic investigation into securing the ruins was made in Soviet times. Late in the 20th century, the Uzbek government began restoration of three dome buildings and the main portal. In 1974 the government of the then-Uzbek SSR began the complex reconstruction of the mosque. The decoration of domes and facades was extensively restored and supplemented. During these restorations, a band of inscriptions revealing Surat al-Baqarah of the Quran was added to the main sanctuary iwan of the mosque. As of 2016, work on the mosque restoration was ongoing.

In October 2024 the Qatar Fund for Development and the Uzbekistan Art and Culture Development Foundation agreed to provide $4,175,000 of funding to the Aga Khan Trust for Culture for it to restore the mosque complex. The project aims to complete previous restoration efforts and rebuild the mosque, while at the same time training locals in the use of traditional building techniques.

== Architecture ==
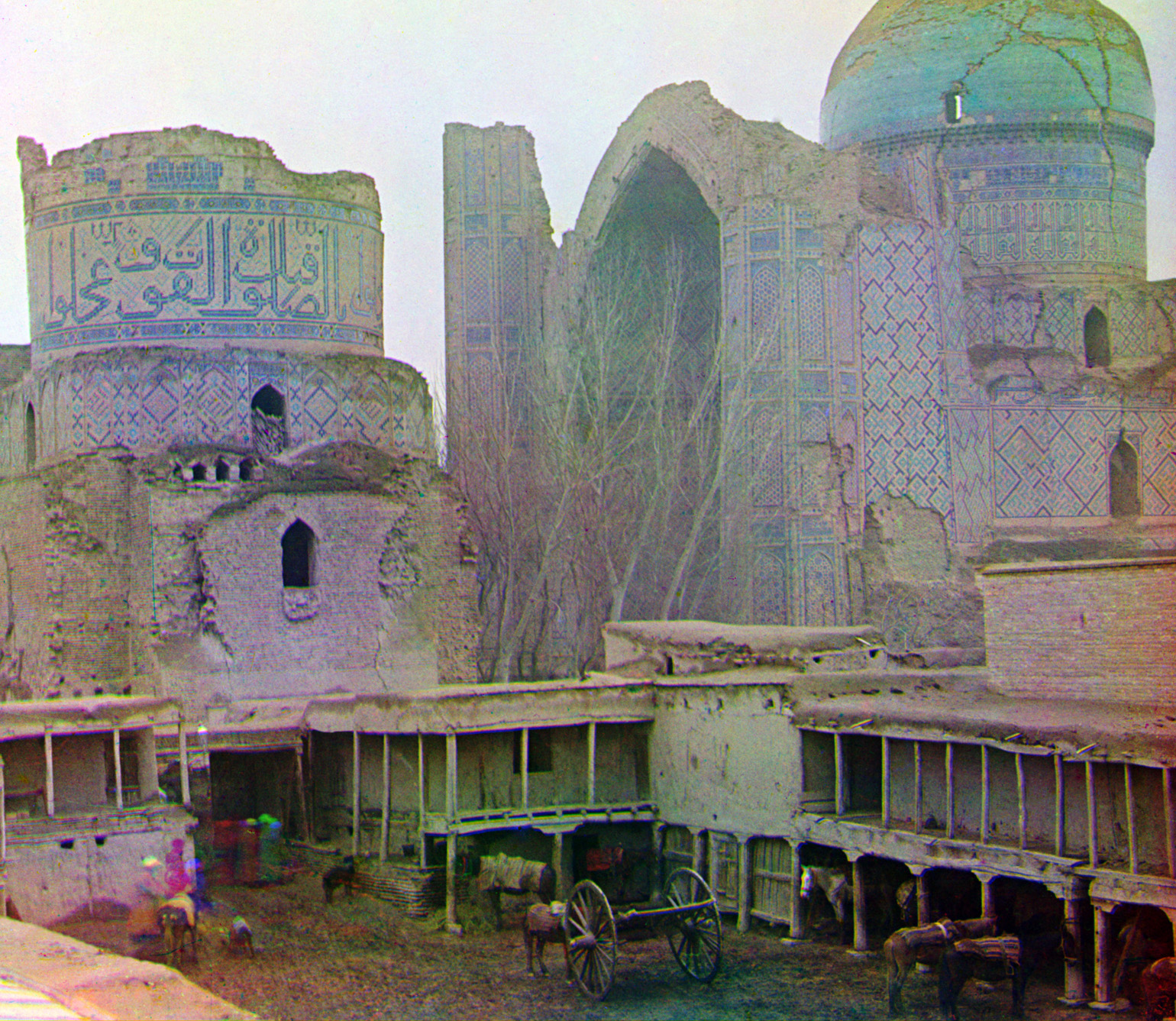
A photograph taken sometime between 1905 and 1915 by color photography pioneer Sergei Mikhailovich Prokudin-Gorskii shows the mosque's appearance after its collapse in the earthquake of 1897.

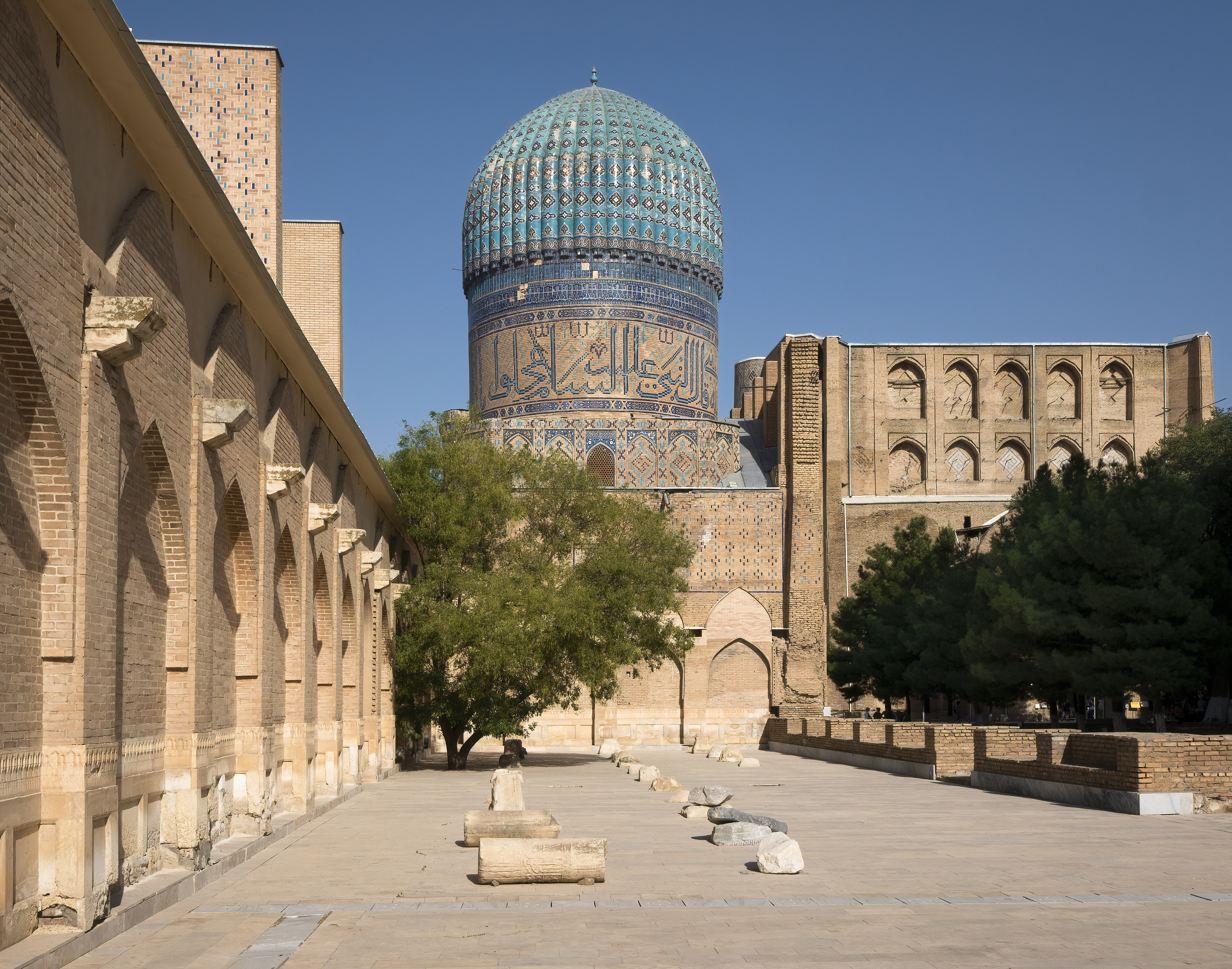
Courtyard of the mosque with north part of the wall

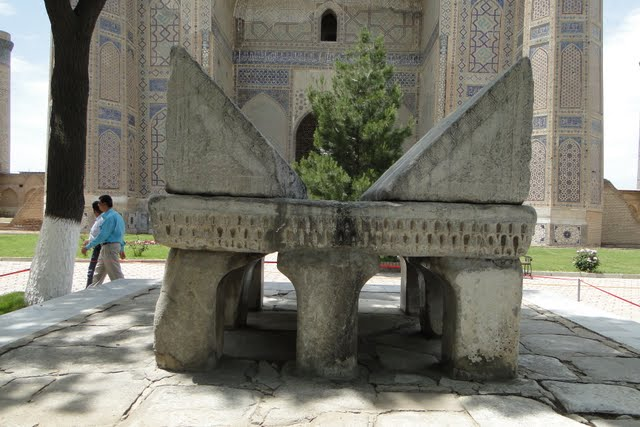
Stone Koran stand

According to the manuscripts, the mosque was erected by the order of Timur in 1399–1405. It possesses the traits typical for many Muslim medieval constructions, especially aivanyard compositions. The mosque follows the basic plan of the courtyard mosque. Its outer walls enclose a rectangular area which measures 167 metres (182.63 yards) in length and 109 metres (119.20 yards) wide and runs roughly from northeast to southwest—the Qibla accordingly. However the size of the site vacant of covered galleries was only 78 by 64 meters.

Entering the mosque from the northeast through the vast (35 metres high) parade portal leads to the courtyard. A monumental dome above a square base, around 40 m high, rises on the opposite site of the courtyard. The dome is the largest cupola of the mosque. Nevertheless, the dome cannot be seen from the courtyard, for whole building is covered up from inside by the grandiose pischtak, which framed a monumental, deeply embedded iwan. The iwan does not allow getting inside the underlying construction supporting the dome; this can only be done from the sides. Two other domes associated with the iwans, more modest in size, face the center of the long sides of the courtyard. Thus the Bibi-Khanym Mosque implements the classic architectural type of the "four-iwan scheme".

Formerly, there were open galleries measuring 7.2 m high inside the courtyard. Their cover was formed from the juxtaposition of many small, flat brick vaults and domes supported by a forest of more than 400 marble columns and buttresses. Today, only hints of the galleries can be seen.

Four minarets at the outer corners of the site have been restored. Four other, more majestic minarets that flanked the Portal arch of the entrance and the Pischtak of the main domed building are not completed yet.

In the middle of the courtyard is located the stone pedestal—the huge Quran stand—crafted from ornate marble blocks. This sight originates from the time of Timur.

The huge Bibi-Khanym Mosque with its three domed rooms, the covered galleries and the open courtyard was intended to gather the entire male population of Samarkand city for the joint Friday prayers.

In the construction of three domes of Bibi-Khanym mosque, sophisticated in Timur's time, one important innovation was applied: a two-fold construction, where the internal dome hall neither by the form nor by height corresponds to the dome's shape from outside. There is a hollow space between the inner ceiling and the outer cupola. This dome construction allowed the main hall of the mosque to be committed to the proportions and the aesthetics of the 30 m high interior above the mihrab. Meanwhile, the 40 m high outer dome of the main building could be designed for maximal impression and visibility. This scheme was applied also to the lateral dome structures that allowed making modest buildings the figuration tower-like structures with elegant melon-shaped and longitudinally ribbed outer domes.

The interiors of the mosque contain gilding, imitating local brocade embroideries. Bibi-Khanym mosque was one of the most ambitious architectural projects of the Timurid period and influenced the architecture of Central Asia as well as of Iran and Afghanistan.

== Gallery ==
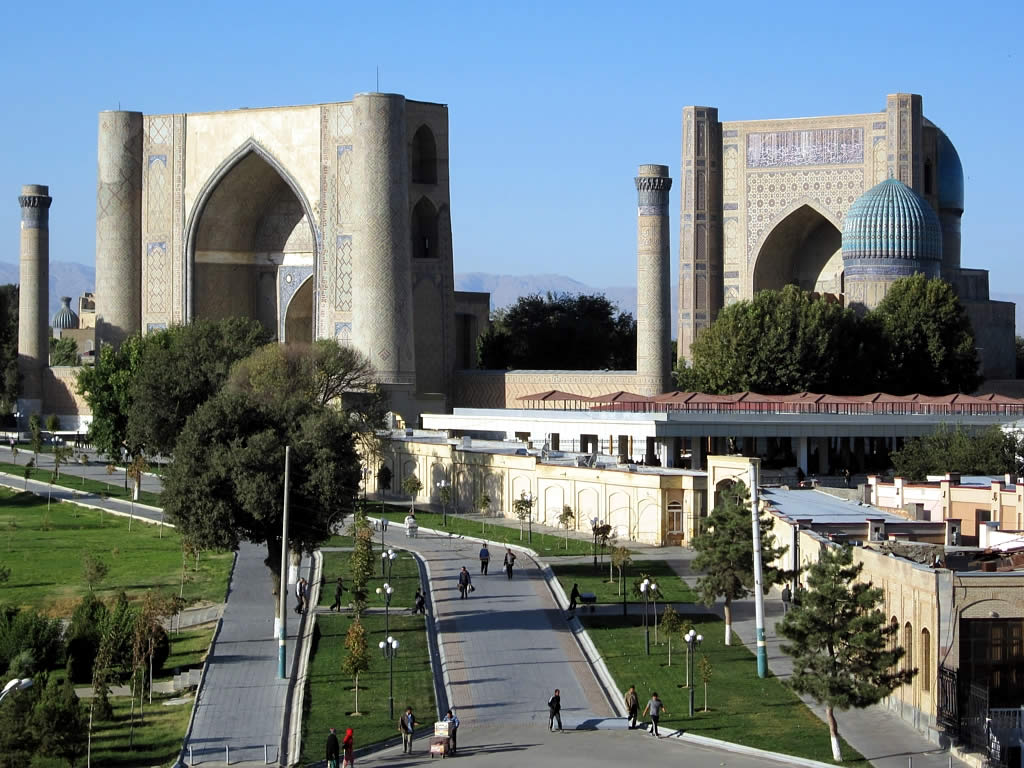
General view

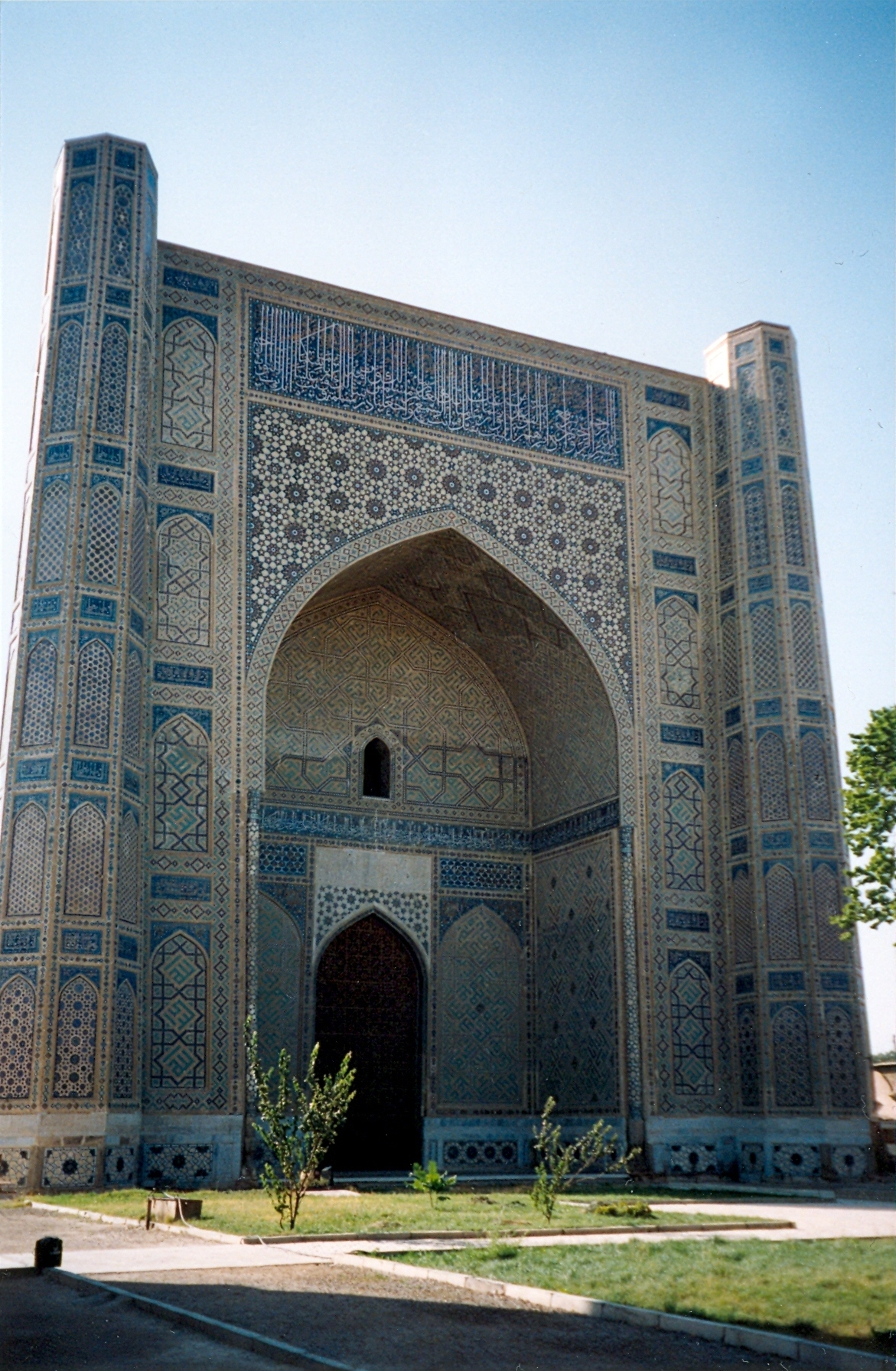
Western iwan of the mosque

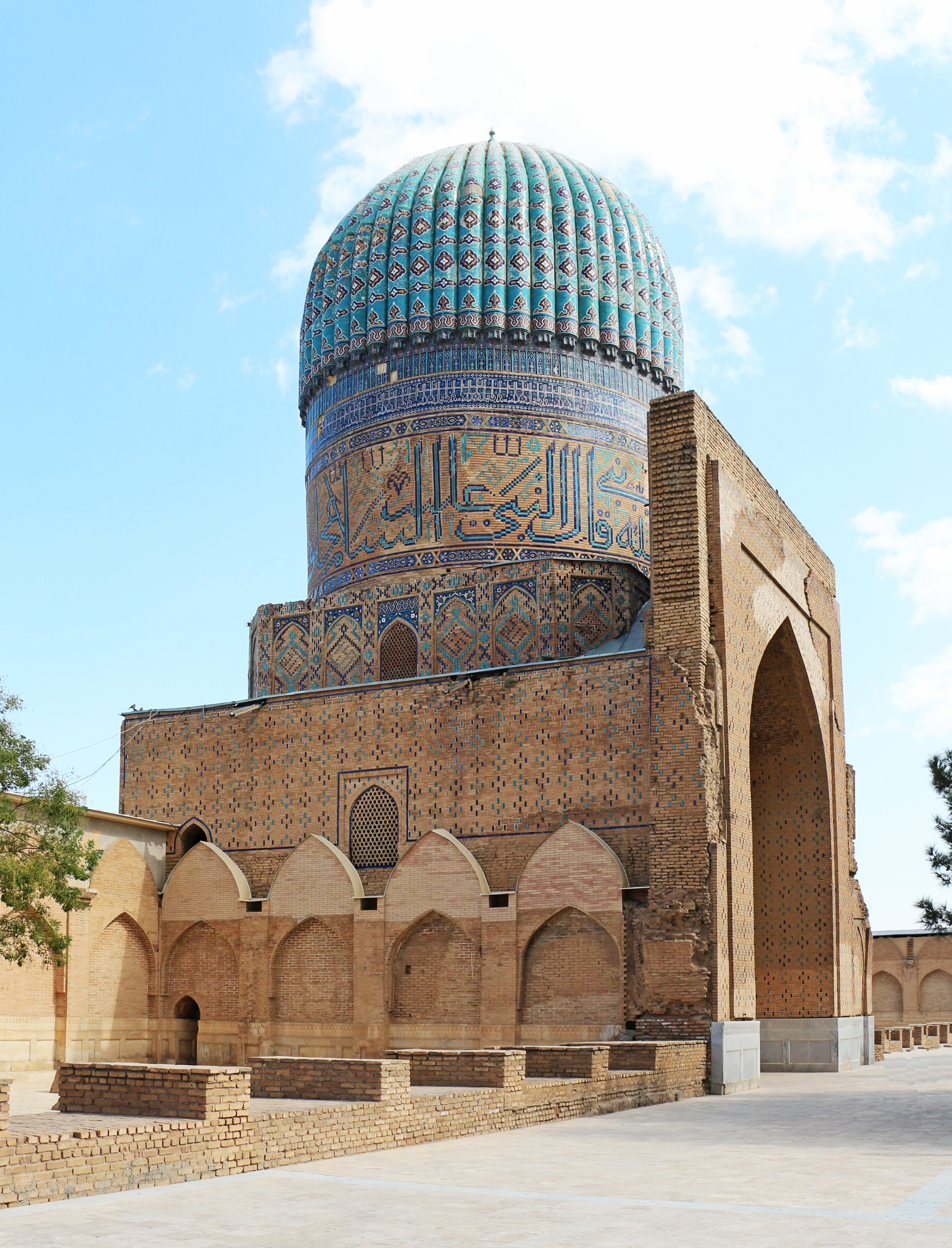
Northern iwan of the mosque

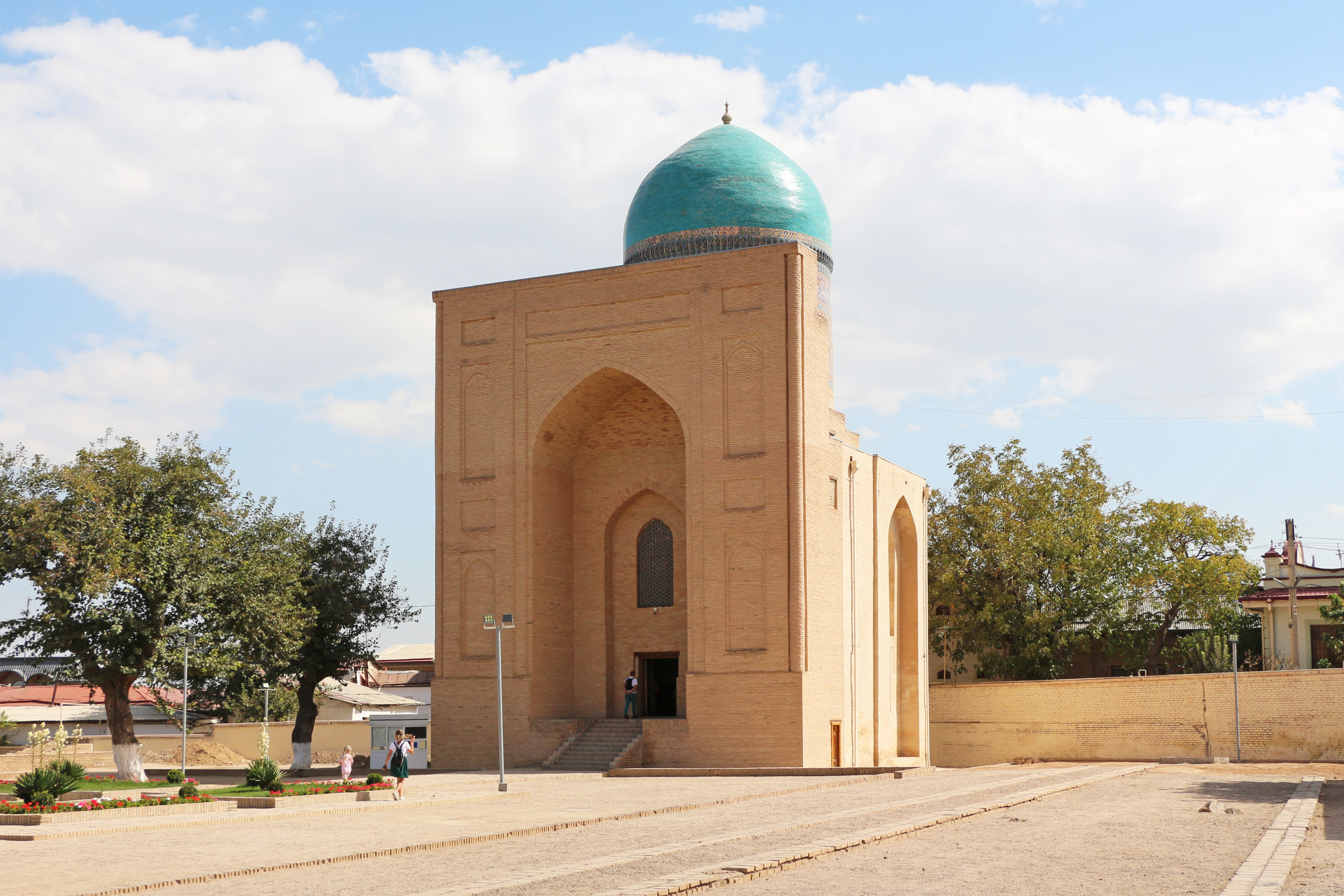
Bibi-Khanym Mausoleum in front of the mosque

Calligraphy in Bibi-Khanym Mausoleum

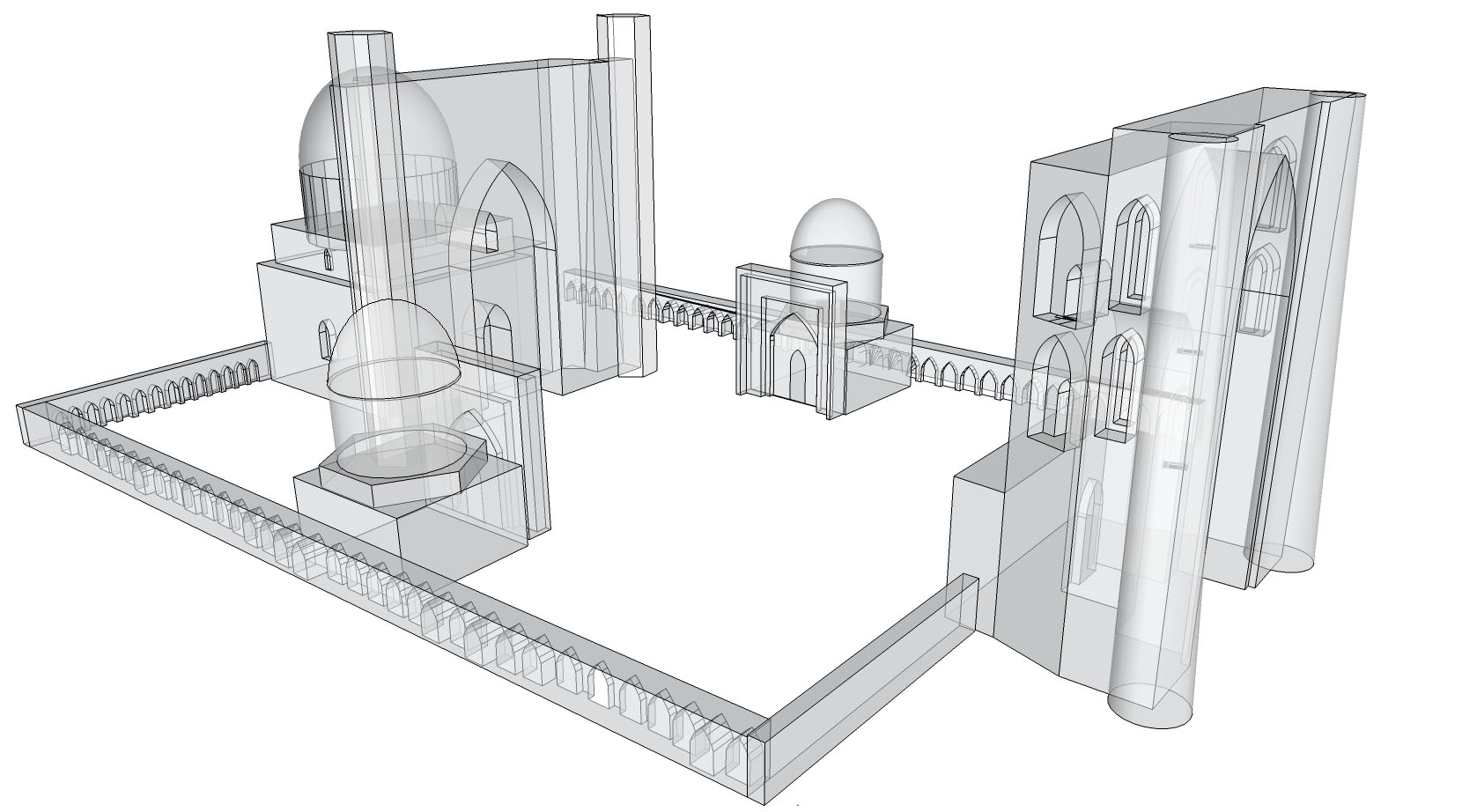
The mosque's four-iwan layout

== See also ==
- Gur-e Amir
- Shah-i-Zinda
- Registan
- Tourism in Uzbekistan
- Persian domes
