= Chorsu =

Chorsu may refer to:

- Chorsu Bazaar, a market in Tashkent, Uzbekistan
- Chorsu (Tashkent Metro), a metro station in Tashkent, Uzbekistan
- Chorsu (Samarkand), a building in Samarkand, Uzbekistan
- Chorsu, Vahdat, a jamoat of the city of Vahdat, Tajikistan
- Chorsu, Lakhsh District, a village in Lakhsh District, Tajikistan
