= Tashkent Children's Library =

- Respublika Bolalar Kutubxonasi

- The 19th-century building of the library in 2024
- Location: 47 Yahyo Gulyamov street, Mirzo Ulugbek, Tashkent 100000, Uzbekistan
- Type: National children's library
- Established: January 1965
- Architects: Unknown, Ivan Markevich
- Service area: The city of Tashkent

Collection
- Items collected: 200,000 (Note: The number of books available to the public is around 20,000)

Other information
- Public transit access: Amir Temur Xiyoboni; /Yunus Rajabiy; 60 (Shastri k.)
- Website: acdflibrary.uz/en

History
- Built: 1880s

Site notes
- Architectural styles: Neoclassical architecture, Russian colonial architecture

Tashkent Children's Library, (Uzbek: Respublika Bolalar Kutubxonasi lit. 'Republic Children's Library'), is a children's library located in central Tashkent, and managed by the Uzbekistan Art and Culture Development Foundation. As of 2023, the library contains an estimated 200 thousand volumes in its stacks.

The library moved into its current building in 1965, after it was formed as the youth division of the Alisher Navoi library. It is located at the intersection of the Yahyo Gulyamov and Uzbekistan Ovozi streets, about half a kilometer (0.3 mi) from the central Amir Timur Square. The library was built in the neoclassical style, and the structure served as the city council building from 1909.

The building was expanded in 1909, and it had been used in various ways, until the library moved into it. However, by then, the added part of the building was demolished and only the western side of it remains today. It underwent vast restoration beginning in 2020.

== History ==
The building with the extension, on a postal mark, reading "Vadyaevski Theater"

The current building of the library was built in the 1880s, as a mansion in the new part of Tashkent for the Vadyayev entepreneur brothers from Kogon. The building was likely also used as a theater. They sold it to the city in 1909, and a vast attachment was added by Ivan Markevich, the future lead architect of Tashkent. Afterwards, it was used as the Public Assembly of the Tashkent City Duma.

In mid-1910s it housed the Tashkent Military school, and later, the "House of Freedom", until the Russian Revolution. During the early Soviet period of Tashkent the building became the meeting place of the Tashkent Soviet (City Council), until the 1930s, when a cinema theater named "30 years of Komsomol" was opened there. Additionally, the Russian Operetta Theater played in the building, from late 1930s to late 1940s.

At some point after the decline of the cinema theater, the main part of the building, added by architect Markevich, was demolished, and only the western part that stands today was preserved. In 1965 the youth division of the Alisher navoi library moved into the building, and it was later renamed into its current name.

One of the paintings found during the restoration

During subsequent restoration, in 2020, it was theorized that the panel paintings on the walls inside the building were created at some point in the 1960s.

In 2019 the library's collection included 159,724 books, as well as other additional forms of information.

=== Restoration ===
In 2020, ACDF started working on the restoration of the building, together with the Russian architectural bureau, Ludi Architects.

Amid restoration efforts, several panel paintings were found under the layers of wall-paint. A Turkish hereditary restoring company Mesa dealt with the panel paintings. They observed that the paintings were made with oil paint on the wall surface of a sun-dried mixture of straw and clay. The restorers concluded that the decision to paint over the paintings completely preserved them in the end.

The restoration of the building ended in 2023, and the library re-opened on August 31. It was stated that the library plans to expand its collection to 300-400 thousand items, by its management after the re-opening.

== Gallery ==
The building after the addition of a side by architect Markevich, when it was used by the city Duma

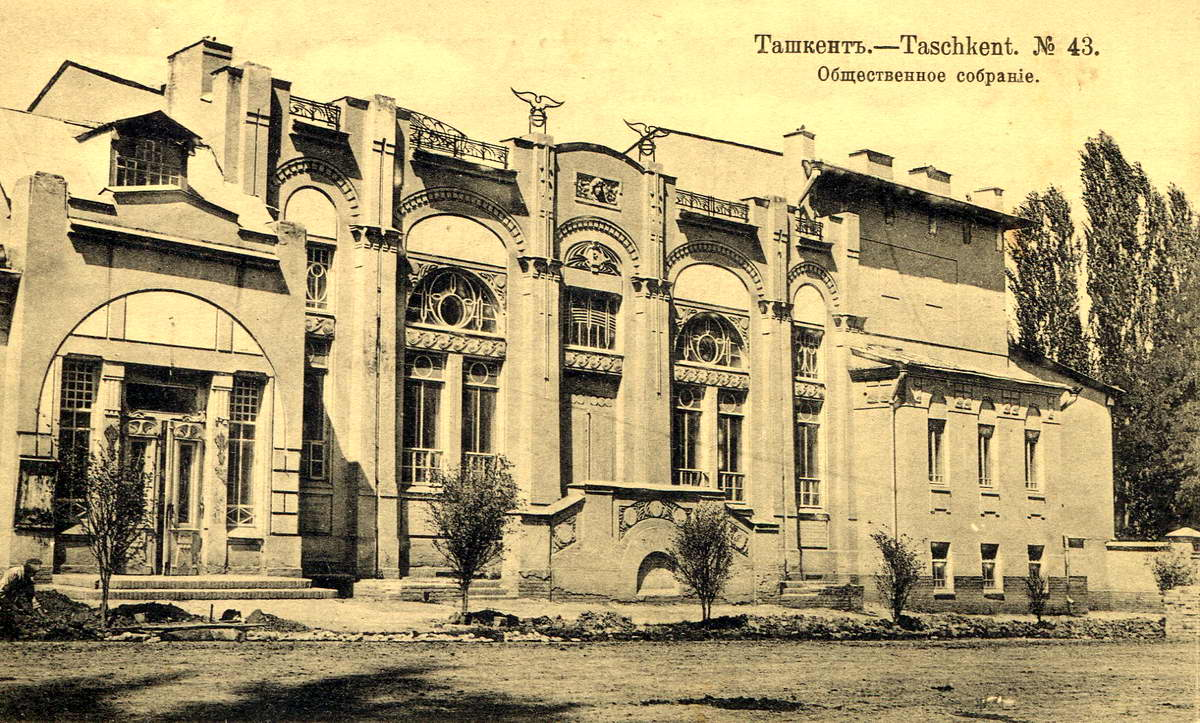
The destroyed part of the building

The main entrance to the library building

One of the main halls of the library

Elaborate facade decorations

The back garden of the library

== See also ==
- National Library of Uzbekistan
- Gayane Umerova
- National Palace of Cinematography of Uzbekistan
