= Architecture of Uzbekistan =

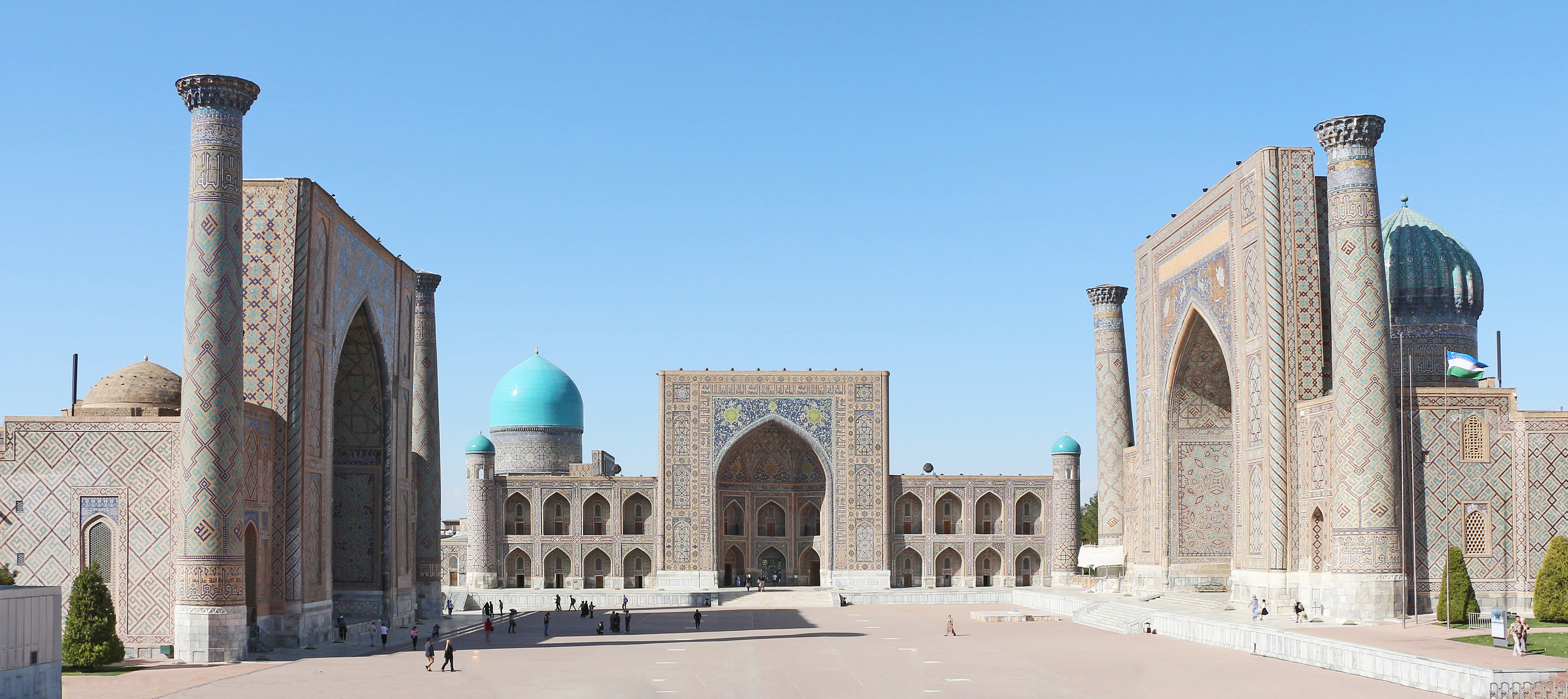
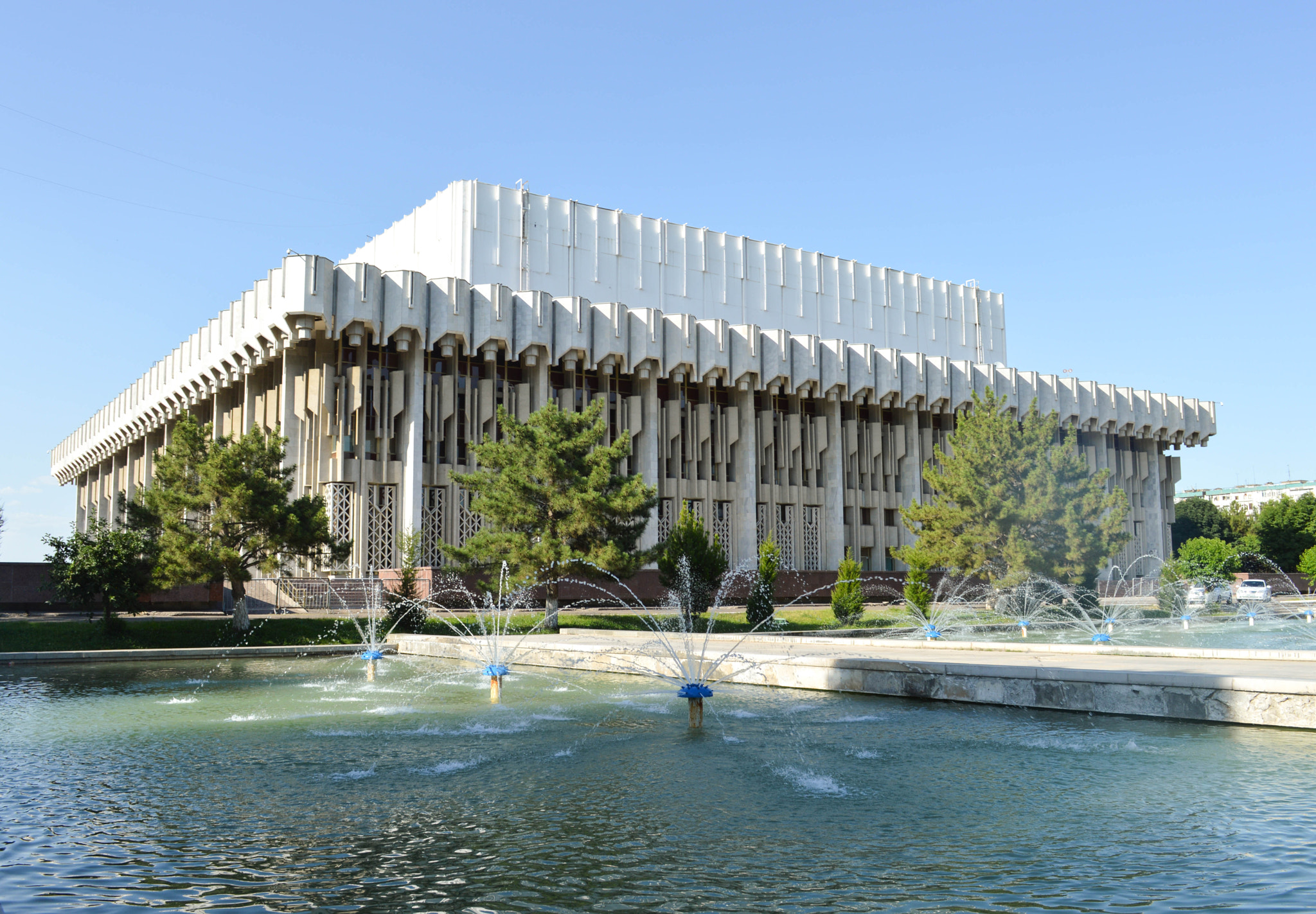
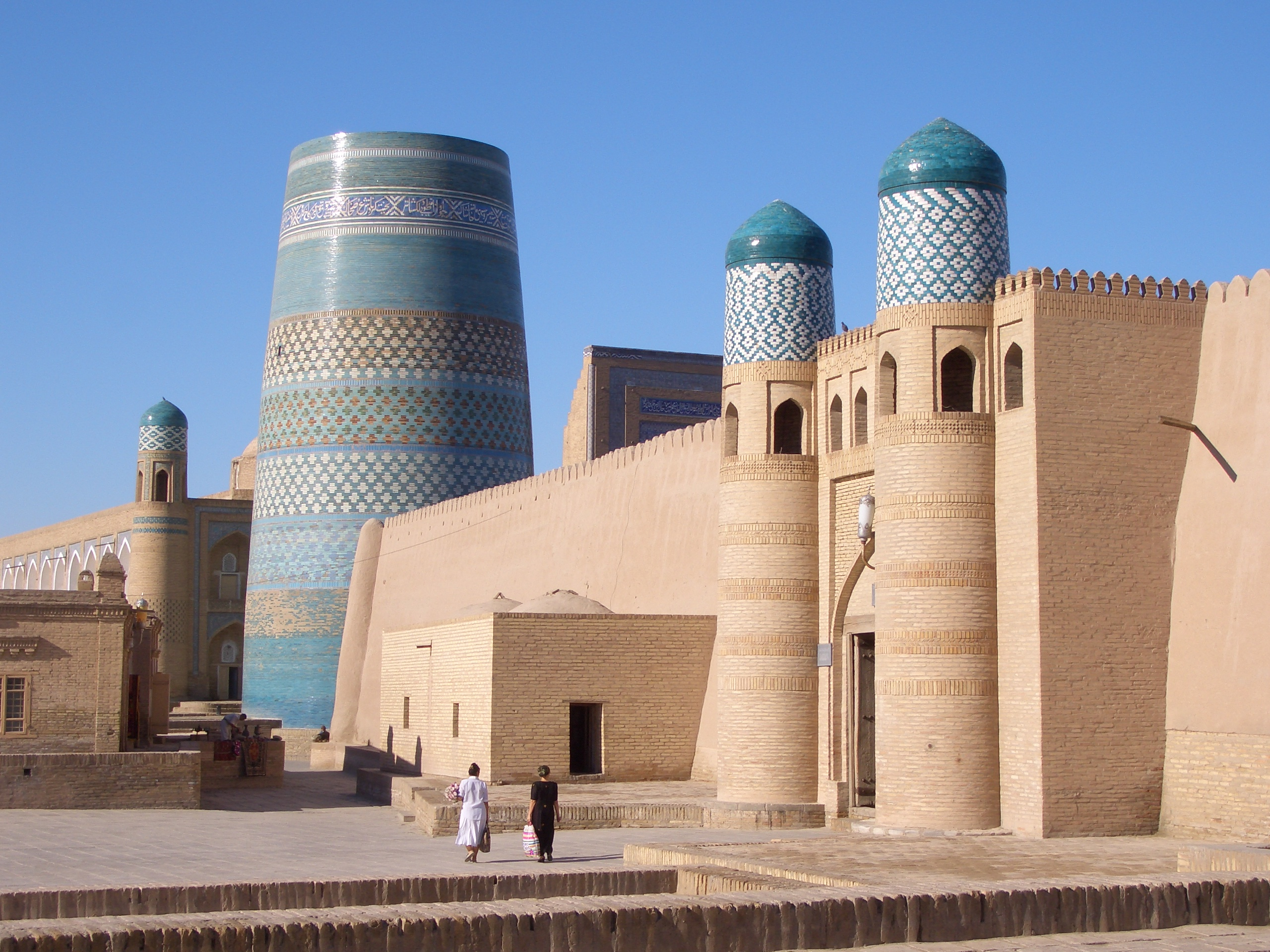
Uzbek architecture includes of a combination of architectural styles.
Top: Registan Square, Samarkand
Centre left: Tashkent Tower
Centre right: Peoples' Friendship Palace
Bottom left: Kaltaminor minaret, Khiva
Bottom right: Alisher Navoi State Academic Bolshoi Theatre

The architecture of Uzbekistan, or Uzbek architecture includes a combination of architectural styles, from ancient traditional design to present day contemporary architecture. Centers of Uzbek architecture are Samarkand, Bukhara, Khiva, Shakhrisabz, Termez, and Kokand. A number of ancient architectural masterpieces have survived, including palaces, mausoleums, mosques, and minarets. Colorful mosaics, religious symbols, and abstract geometrical patterns are major characters of architecture in Uzbekistan.

Archaeological research on Central Asia has revealed architectural trends running parallel to the Acheulean era. In fact, remains of monuments from both the Stone and Bronze Ages have been found in the Surkhandarya, Tashkent, Samarkand, Fergana, and Navoi regions of the country. During the Middle Ages, Uzbek architecture flourished as a result of being a central link in the 11,000-kilometre-long (7,000 mi) Silk Road. Timurid-period architecture from the 14th to 16th century, as well as the architecture of the Shaybanid era in the 16th century, contributed greatly to the development of Islamic architecture. In the 21st century, Uzbek architecture has been characterized by its balance of traditional design and modern innovation.

== Pre-Islamic architecture ==
The earliest traces of human habitation in the area of Uzbekistan date back to the Paleolithic Era. Ancient settlements prove that the earliest architecture can be found in Sapallitepa (14th–17th centuries BC) and Jarkutan (9th–14th centuries BC). Buddhist monuments, namely Fayaz Tepe and Kara Tepe, have also been found in the Surhandarya region (1st–3rd centuries AD). Each of these sites reflect the different stages of Central Asian civilization. The ancient city of Khorezm was established 982 years before Alexander the Great invaded Central Asia, over 34 centuries ago.

== Islamic architecture ==
Bukhara, Samarkand, and Khiva played a vital role in the influence of Middle Ages architecture in Uzbekistan. For instance, palaces of the rulers, aristocratic places of residence, market places, madrasas, and mausoleums are confirmed as exceptional architectural examples.

=== The Kyrk-Kyz ===
The Kyrk-Kyz ("Forty Girls") mansion in Termez, dating back to the 9th and 10th centuries, is a fine example of an original country manor. The Samanids Mausoleum in Bukhara still stands as a fine architectural building from the period of the early Middle Ages.

=== Registan ===
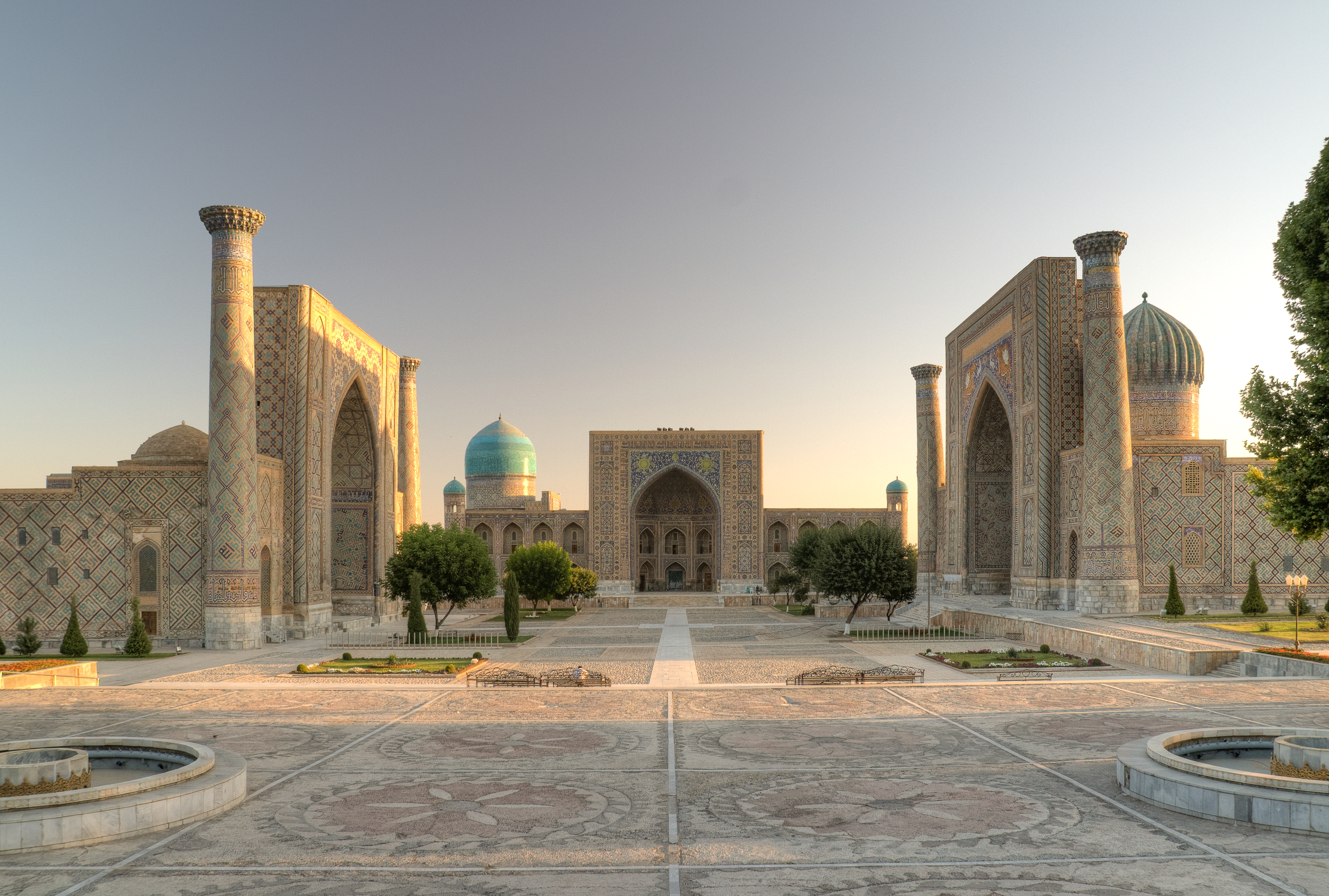
The Registan in Samarkand, with its three madrasas

In the 11th and 12th centuries, Samarkand became one of the major cities in the region. The city's historic public square, the Registan, was termed "the noblest public square in the world" by Lord Curzon, and it remains the main artwork and heart of the ancient city.

The Registan is framed by three madrasas (Islamic schools) of distinctive Islamic architecture: the Ulugh Beg Madrasa (1417–1420), the Tilakari Madrasa (1646–1660), and the Sherdar Madrasa (1619–1636).

The Ulugh Beg Madrasa was built in the Timurid Empire era of Timur, known as Tamerlane. The madrasa features a lancet-arch (pishtaq), or main square entrance. High minarets highlight each corner. There is a mosaic panel over the entrance arch, which was decorated by geometrical, stylized ornaments. The building consists of a mosque and lecture rooms, specialized for student use. The walls have magnificent art galleries along the axes.

The Sherdar and Tilakari madrasas were built in the 17th century ordered by Uzbek ruler of Samarkand, Yalangtoʻsh Bakhodir. Tiger mosaics appear on the face of each madrasa.

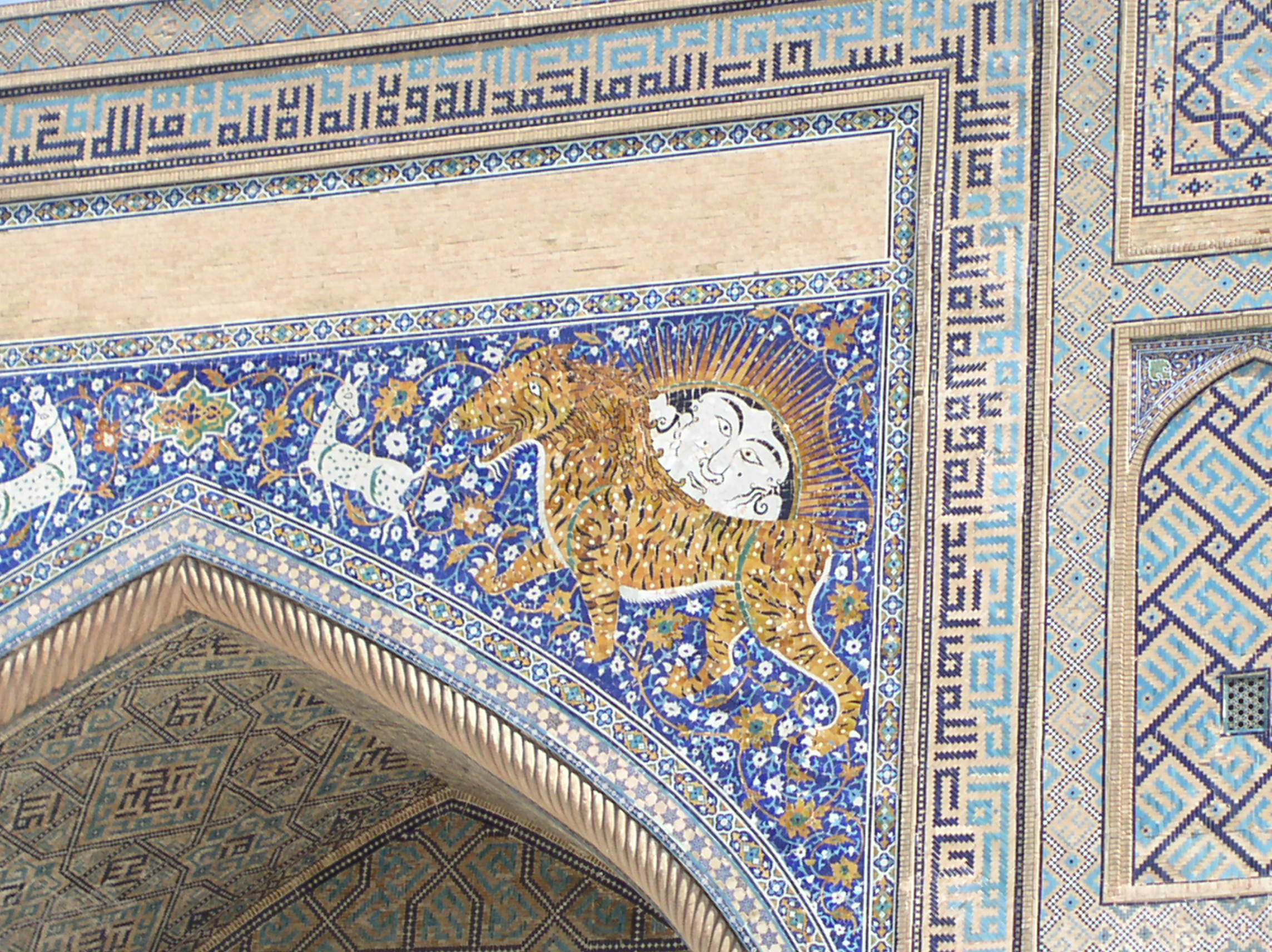
An image of a lion on the Sherdar Madrasa

The Sher Dar Madrasa has unique features including figures of lions, tigers, deer, and human faces. These are not only paintings, but also special symbols of power according to the perceptions of Islam.

The Tilya-Kori Madrasa (meaning "gold-covered") is known as the last, largest, and most glorious structure of the Registan Square. The Tilla-Kari madrasa includes a 120-meter-long façade, relieving the square's oppressive symmetrical axis. The composition of minarets at the corners gives strength to the architecture of the madrasa. Exterior scenes are enriched by poly-chromatic tiles with geometric patterns. At the center, a tall pishtaq enables each façade to be more glorious.

The architecture of Temur's period captures the 13th century well. In particular, strong castles symbolized strong government, the authority, and victory of the Islamic civilization, while marketplaces and living quarters symbolized the role of trade and the essence of complex urban life.

=== Bibi-Khanym Mosque ===
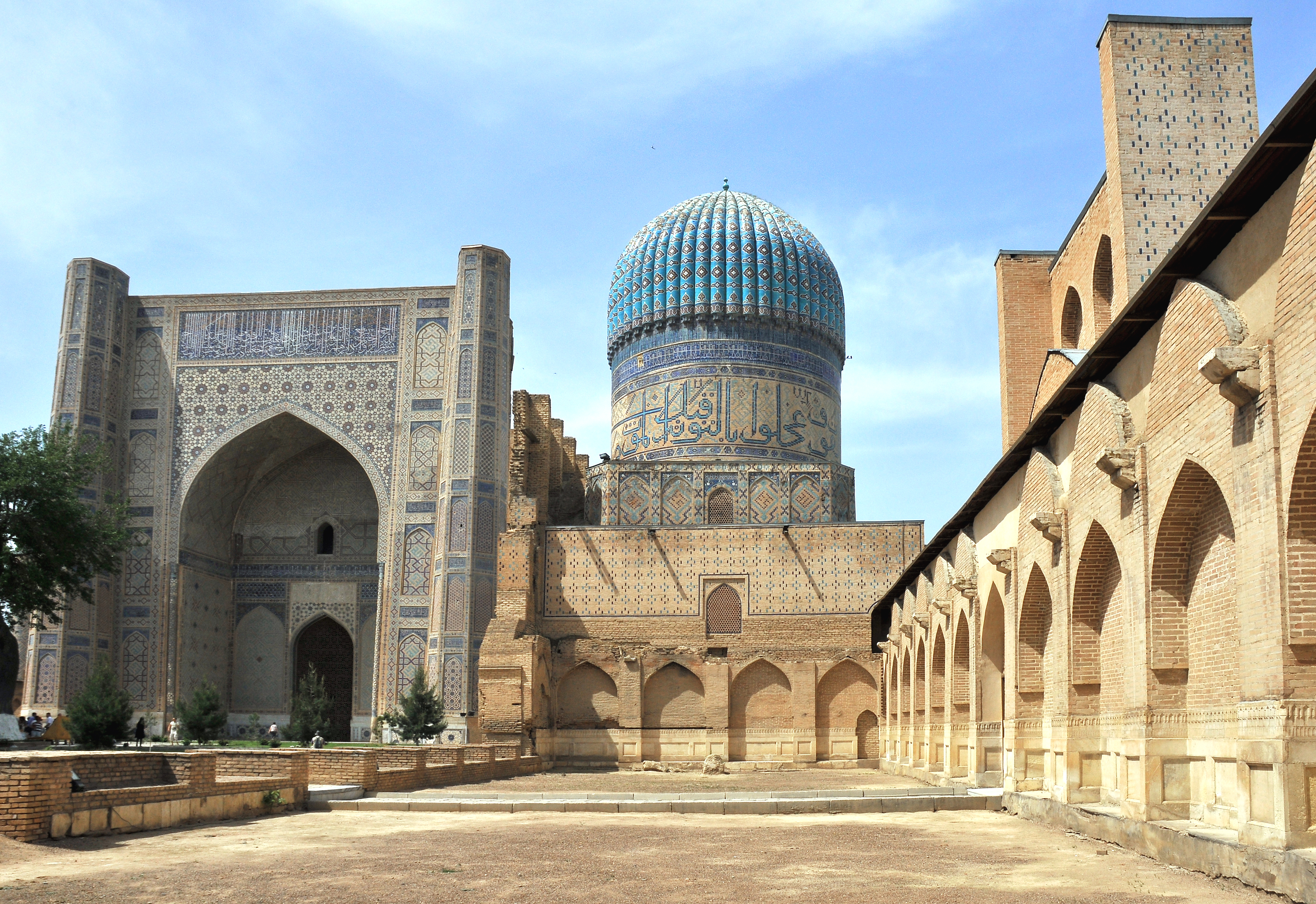
Bibi-Khanym Mosque

One of the greatest monuments of Uzbek architecture is the Bibi-Khanym Mosque. It has 115 feet high portals, 165-foot minarets, 400 cupolas, and a large courtyard. The gates are made of seven different metals, and the building itself is made of marble and terracotta, and is decorated with mosaics and blue-gold frescoes.

The period of the Timurid dynasty (14th to the 16th century) and the Shaybanid era (16th century) is famous for its colorful architectural designs, such as turquoise-colored domes, exemplified by the dome of the Gur-e-Amir (Timur's mausoleum in Samarkand).

=== Residential buildings ===
In 18th-19th centuries, most residential architecture reflected simple historical style, with certain elements designed to suit the climate. Houses in Bukhara generally accommodated living space away from the street, with its noise and dust. Another example is Khiva, which generally has high terraces open to the wind to provide natural ventilation. In Ferghana, most houses had sliding walls and shutters and were frequently decorated with niches, ganch (wooden architecture), among other features. Although simple in design, residential architecture throughout the country is often efficient, with special elements of Uzbek culture.

== Russian colonial and Soviet architecture ==
Romanov Palace in Central Tashkent

After the Russian conquest of Central Asia local architecture was greatly influenced by the Russian Empire. Russian military engineers designed "new cities" next to the existing ones. They often segregated local communities, and some features include regular grid plans, boulevards, and squares, as well as the most common material used was fired bricks.

A prime example of Russian colonial architecture in Uzbekistan is the Romanov Palace in Tashkent. Other government and major buildings throughout Uzbekistan were also built in that style, including mansions, state banks, and gymnasiums.

=== Modernism ===
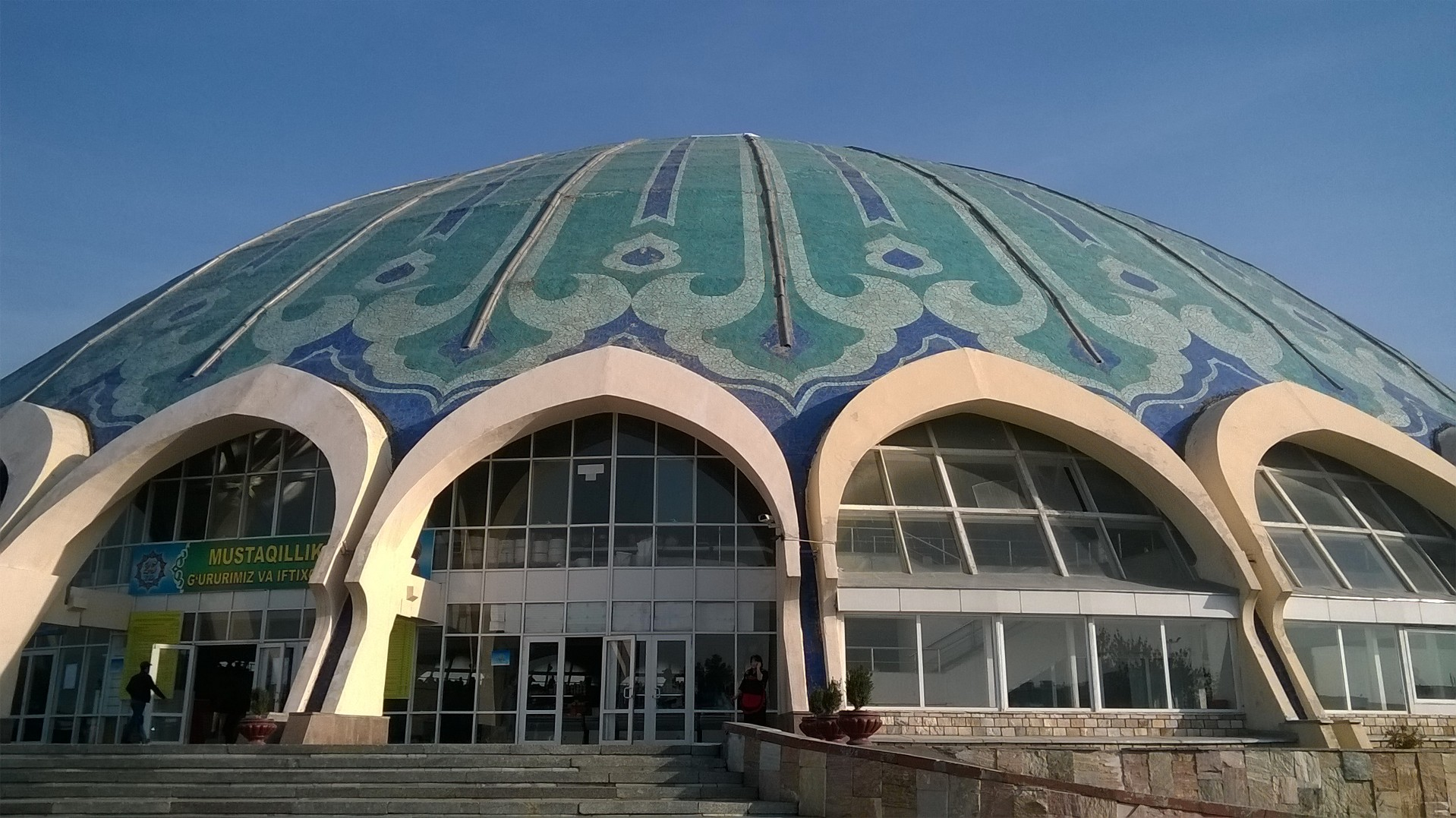
The Chorsu Bazaar in Tashkent

In 1960s, modernist architecture greatly developed in Uzbekistan, especially after the 1966 earthquake in Tashkent. As a result of massive destruction caused by the earthquake, most buildings in the city were destroyed, and in their place architects designed the new buildings in the style of modernist architecture. A big role in their construction was played by the volunteers who helped build back the city after the earthquake.

==== UNESCO World Heritage Site ====
Ten modernist buildings and urban complexes built in the 1960s to 1990s in Tashkent were designated a World Heritage Site called "Tashkent Modernist Architecture. Modernity and Tradition in Central Asia" in 2026.

- Peoples' Friendship Palace
- Big Solar Furnace
- Chorsu Market
- State Museum of History of Uzbekistan
- Kosmonavtlar Metro Station
- Museum of Arts of Uzbekistan
- Alisher Navoi Cinema Palace
- State Circus
- Zhemchug Residential Building
- Central Exhibition Hall of Academy of Arts

== Gallery ==
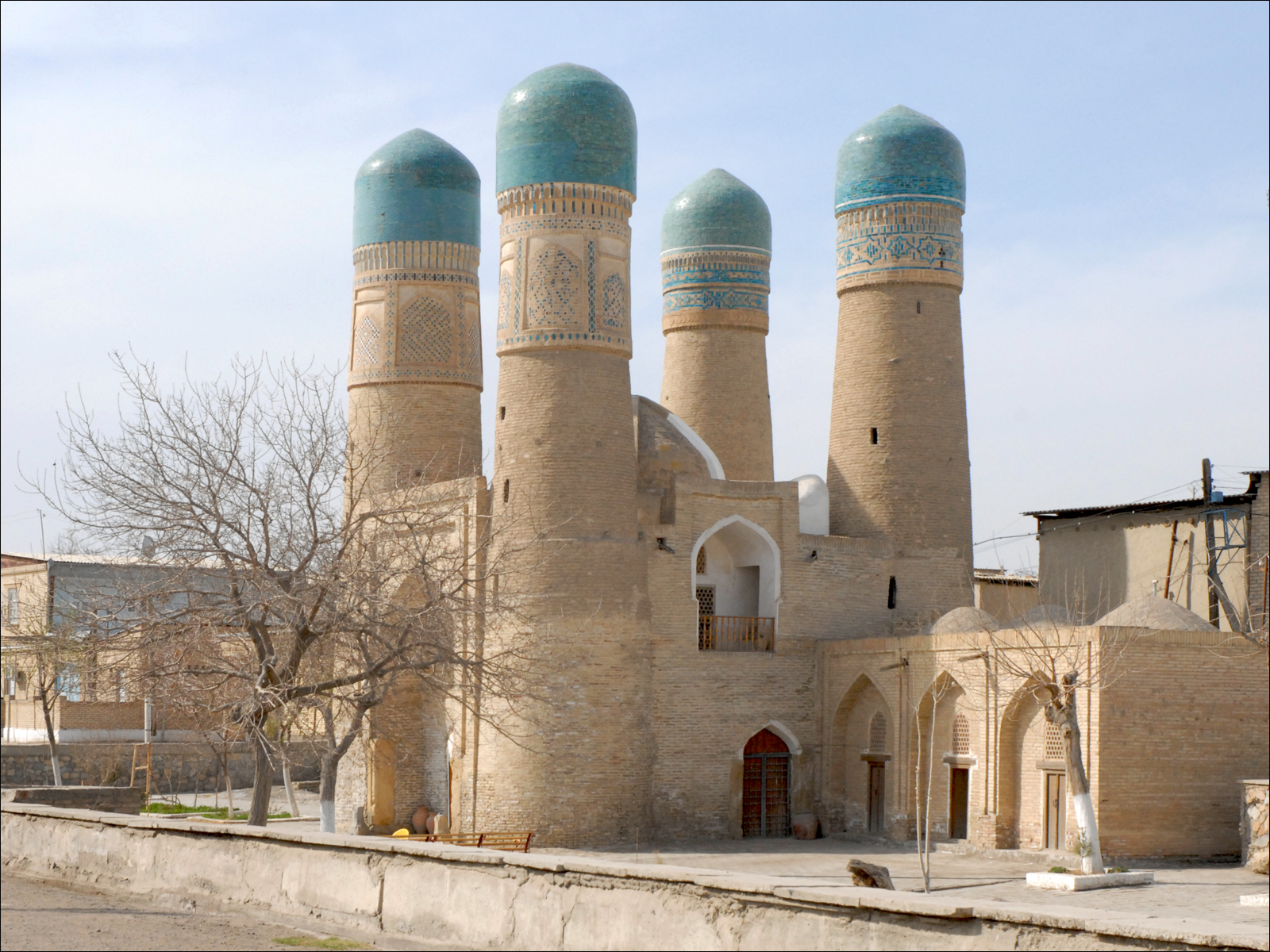
Madrasah of Khalif Niyaz-kul, Bukhara

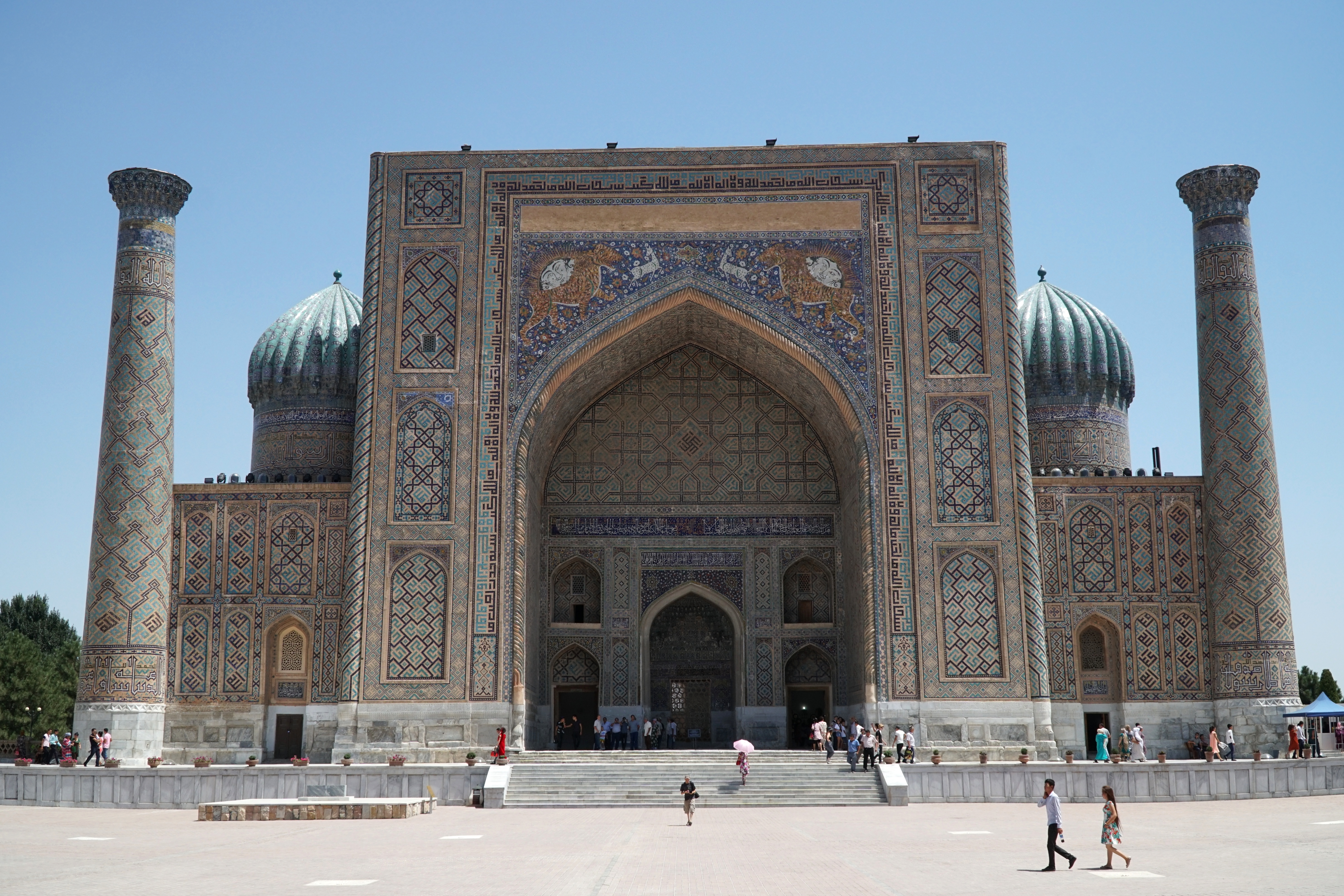
Sherdar Madrasa, Samarkand

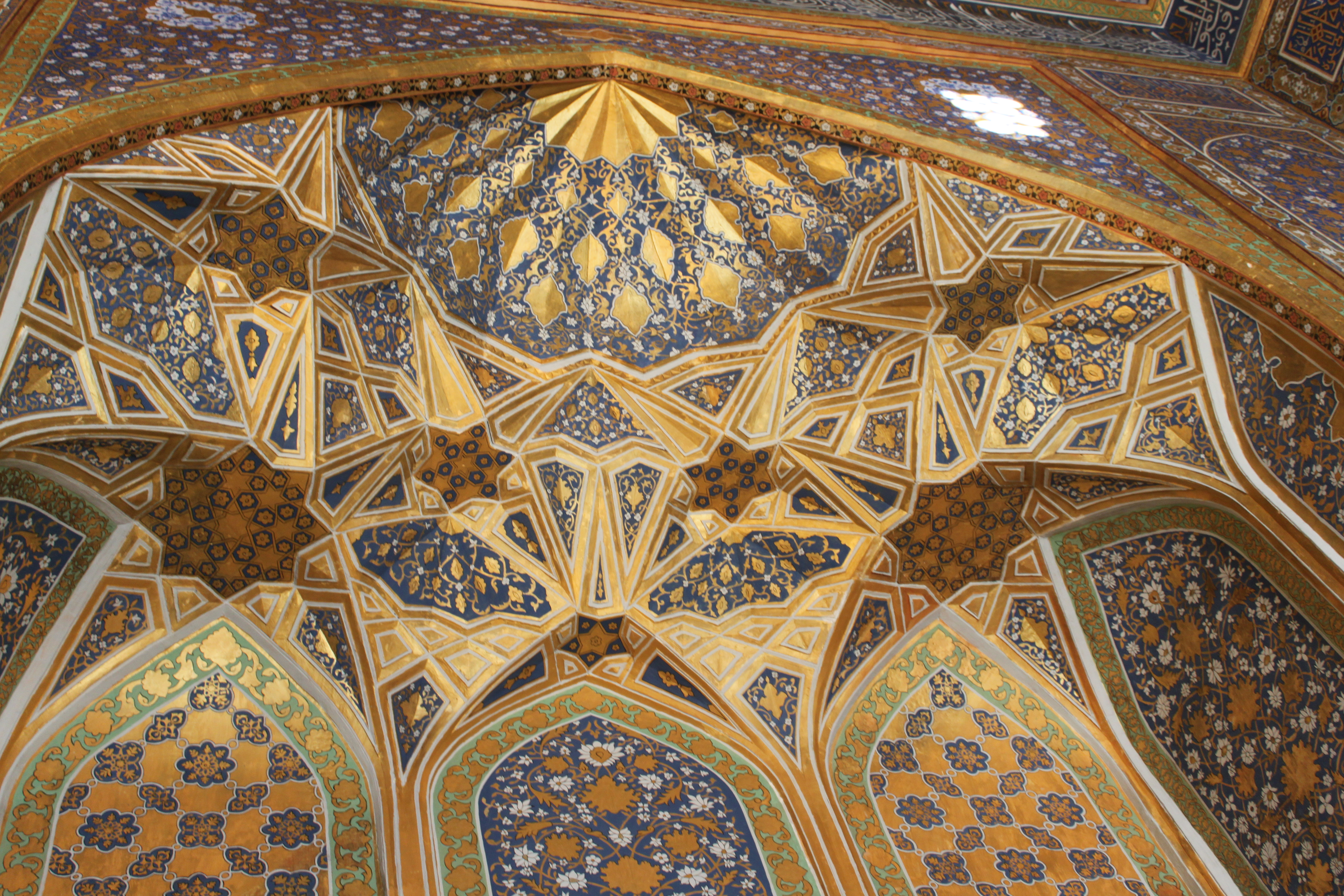
Interior of the Sherdar Madrasa, Samarkand

Toprak-Kala, Karakalpakstan

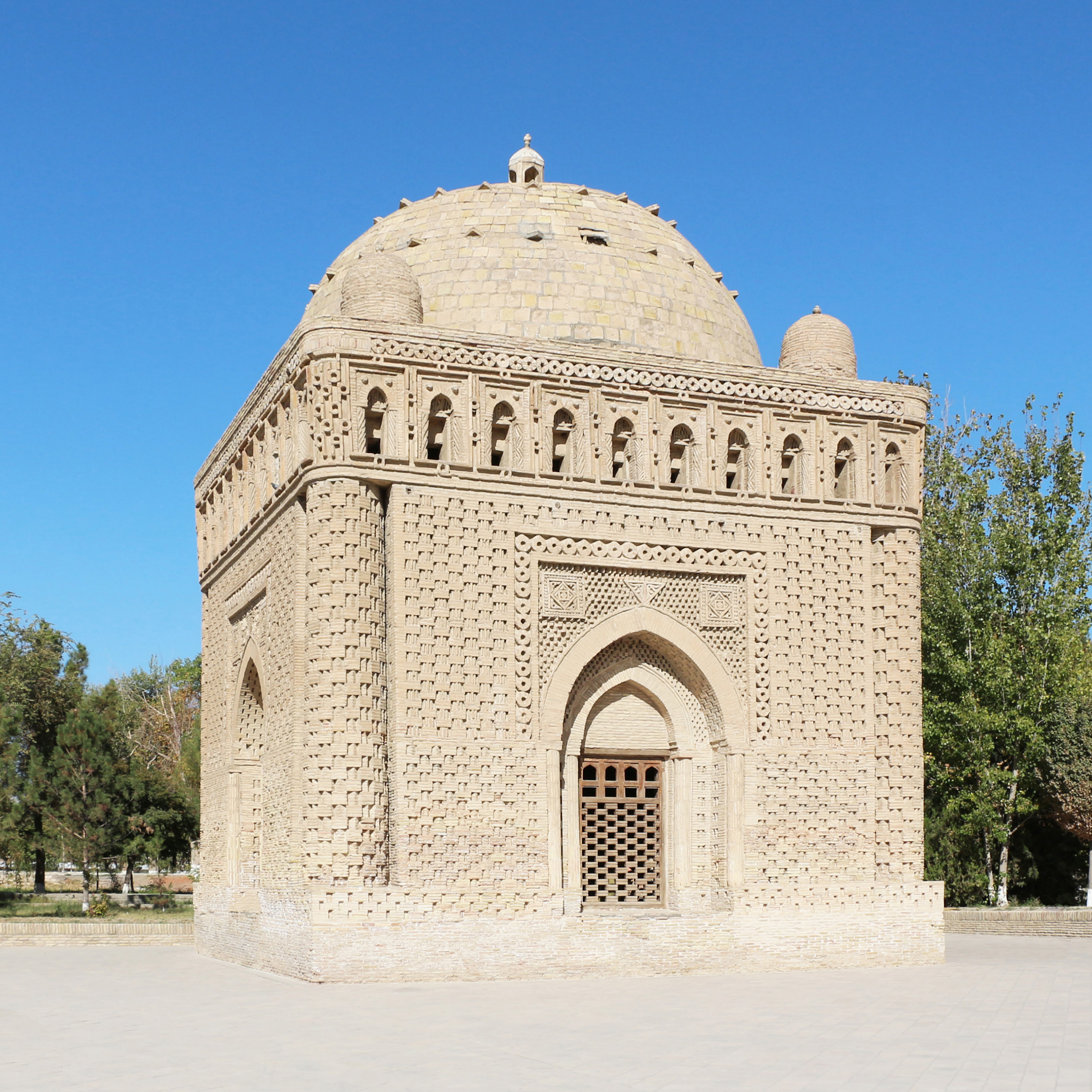
Samanid Mausoleum, Bukhara

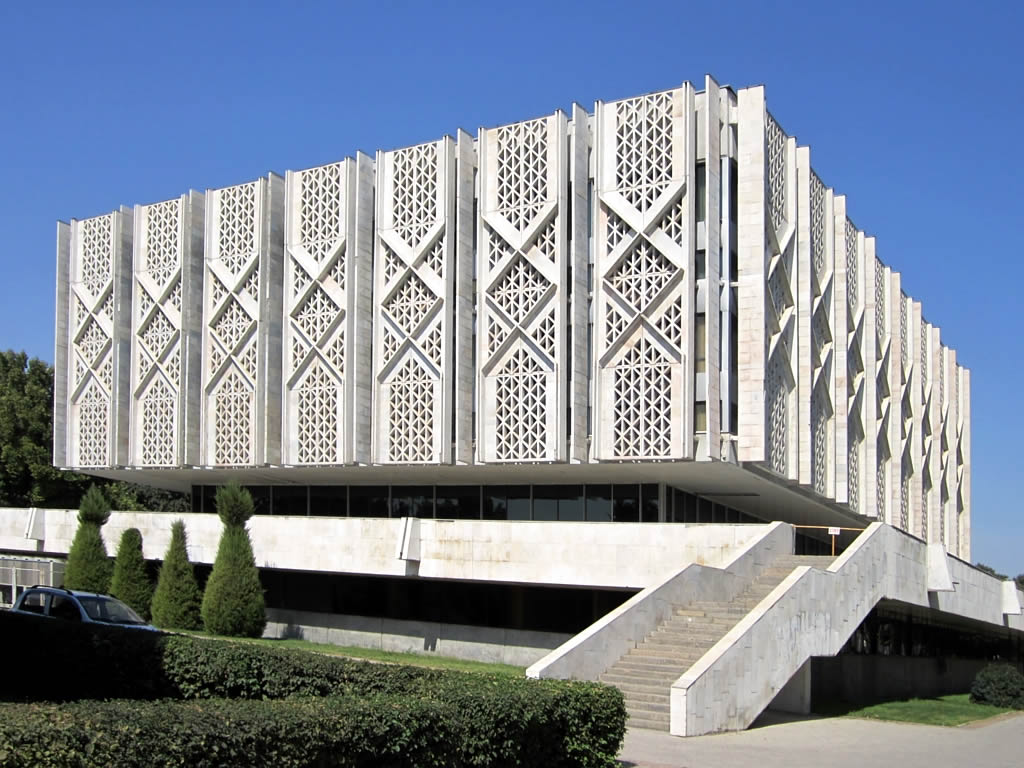
State Museum of History of Uzbekistan

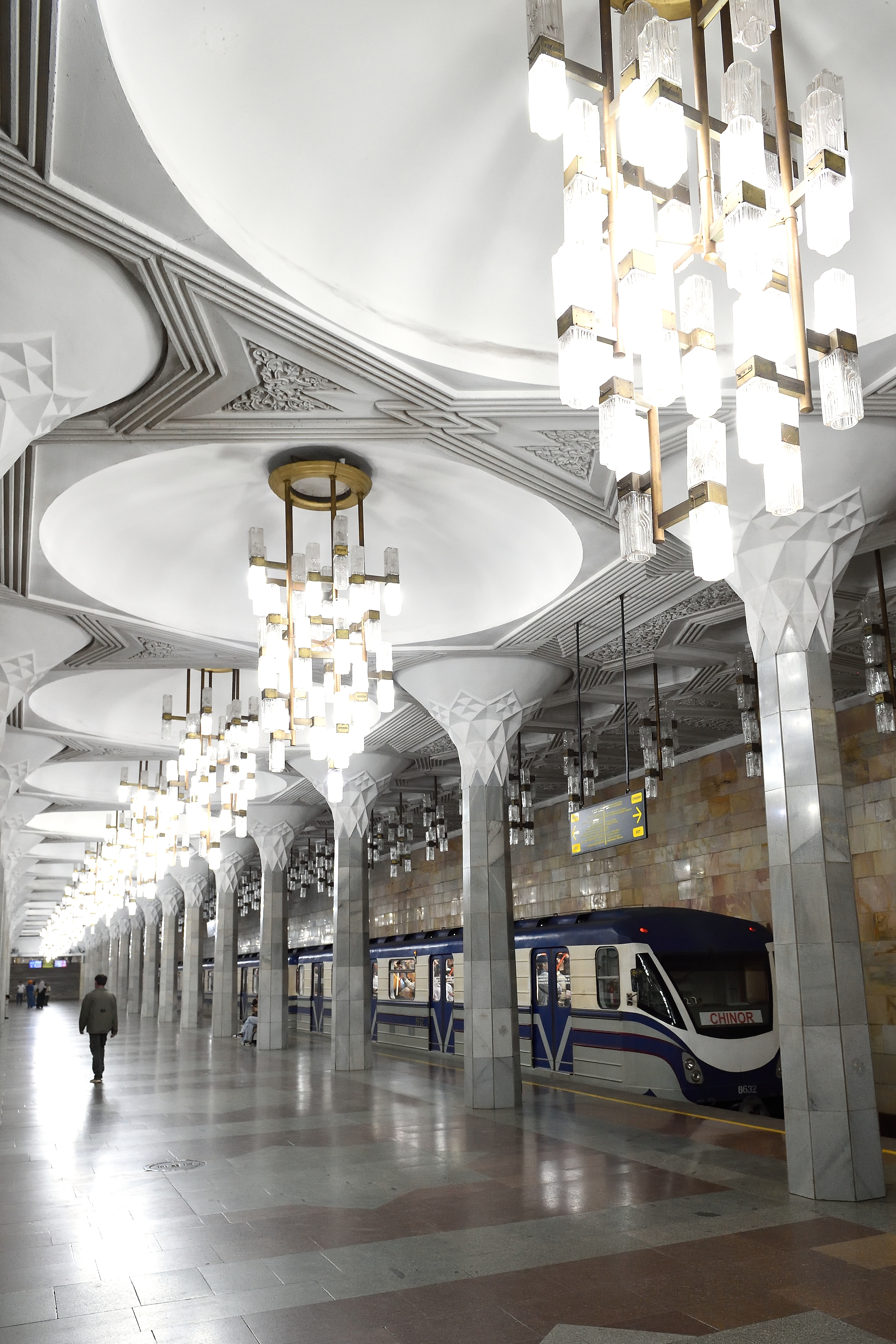
Mustaqilliq Maidoni metro station

Tashkent Children's Library building

== See also ==
- Architecture of Central Asia
