= Sergo Sutyagin =

Uzbekistani architect (1937–2021)

- Серго Михайлович Сутягин
- Born: February 23, 1937; Moscow, USSR
- Died: July 28, 2021 (aged 84); Tashkent, Uzbekistan
- Citizenship: Uzbekistan
- Occupation: Architect
- Spouse: Galina Alekseevna Sutyagina
- Projects: Palace of Arts (now the Alisher Navoi Cinema Palace); Memorial Teahouse "Samarkand" in Tashkent; Al-Khwarizmi and Al-Beruni History Museum in Khiva; Concert Hall with a seating capacity of 2300 in Dushanbe, Tajikistan; Administrative Building of the Central Committee of the Communist Party of Uzbekistan in Khiva; Hamza Museum in Kokand; Al-Khwarizmi Monument in Khiva

Sergo Sutyagin (Russian: Серго Михайлович Сутягин) (February 23, 1937 – July 28, 2021) was an Uzbekistani architect. He was a laureate of the State Prize of the Uzbek SSR named after Hamza in 1966, as well as the State Prize of the Republic of Uzbekistan in the field of literature, art, and architecture named after Alisher Navoi, along with other awards.

== Biography ==
Sutyagin was born on February 23, 1937, in Moscow, into an engineer's family. During the war, he was evacuated to the Uzbek SSR, and from 1941 to 1945, he lived with his mother in Samarkand. In 1946, he moved to Tashkent. From 1954 to 1960, he studied at the Central Asian Polytechnic Institute (now Tashkent State Technical University) and graduated from the architectural department of the construction faculty in 1960. In the same year, he began working at the design institute Uzgosproekt (since 1972 – UzNIIP of Urban Planning, currently – UzShaharsozlik LITI). He worked in the position of chief architect of projects and later as the head of the architectural workshop.

He died in 2021 in Tashkent due to complications from COVID-19.

== Main buildings ==
- 1964: Panoramic Cinema Theater / Palace of Arts (now the Alisher Navoi Cinema Palace) in Tashkent, Uzbekistan.
- 1972: Monument "Storks" (sculptor Yuri Kiselev) in Chirchik, Uzbekistan.
- 1975: Memorial Teahouse "Samarkand" in Tashkent, Uzbekistan.
- 1975: House of Everyday Life in Khiva, Uzbekistan.
- 1976: Small Hall of the Palace of Arts in Tashkent, Uzbekistan.
- 1980: Administrative and Public Center in Khiva, Uzbekistan.
- 1981: Hotel in Khiva, Uzbekistan.
- 1983: Al-Khwarizmi and Al-Beruni History Museum in Khiva, Uzbekistan.
- 1984: Metro Station "Prospect Kosmonavtov" in Tashkent, Uzbekistan.
- 1984: Concert Hall with a seating capacity of 2300 in Dushanbe, Tajikistan.
- 1987: Musical-Drama Theater in Kokand, Uzbekistan.
- 1987: Administrative Building of the Central Committee of the Communist Party of Uzbekistan in Khiva, Uzbekistan.
- 1989: Hamza Museum in Kokand, Uzbekistan.
- 1990: Indoor Sports and Health Pool in Nukus, Karakalpakstan, Uzbekistan.
- 1991: Al-Khwarizmi Monument in Khiva, Uzbekistan.

== Filmography ==
- 2018 — Berlin — Akkurgan — Klaus Kostlin.
- 2021 — The Scent of Melon in Samarkand — Architect (Retired) (Voice Role by Sergey Shakurov).
