= Amir Timur Museum =

Museum in Tashkent, Uzbekistan

- Темурийлар тарихи давлат музейи / Temuriylar tarixi davlat muzeyi (Uzbek)
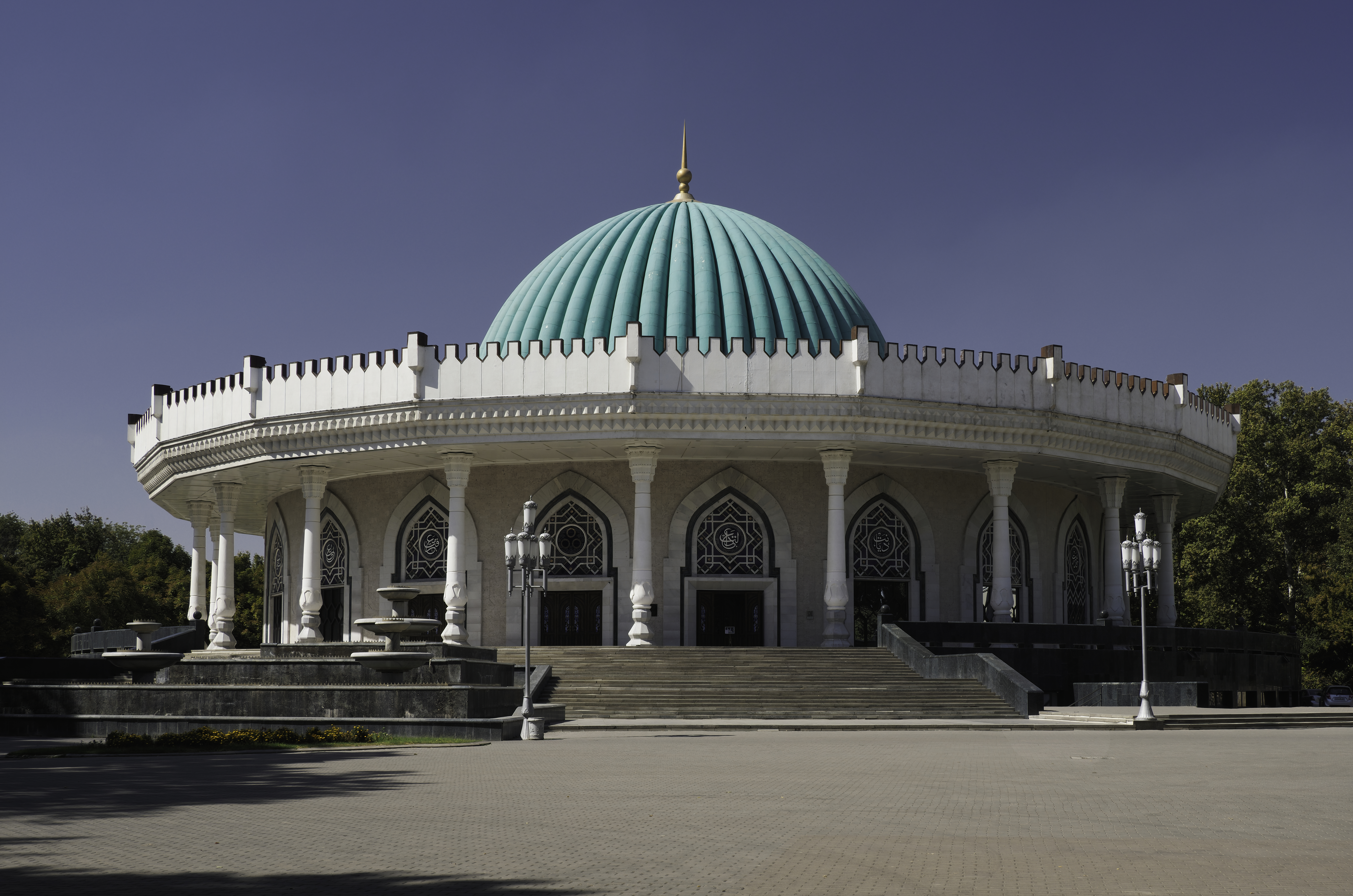

- Location within Uzbekistan
- Established: 18 October 1996
- Location: Tashkent, Uzbekistan
- Coordinates: 41°18′49″N 69°16′44″E
- Type: History; culture
- Public transit access: Amir Temur Xiyoboni; /Yunus Rajabiy; 19, 37, 38, 51, 67, 85, 93 (TSUL)

The Amir Timur Museum (Uzbek: Темурийлар тарихи давлат музейи/Temuriylar tarixi davlat muzeyi) is located in Tashkent, the capital of Uzbekistan. It opened in 1996, and is dedicated to the Turco-Mongol warlord Amir Timur (Tamerlane).

== Origin ==
After Uzbekistan became independent in 1991, much attention was given to the revival of the nation's spiritual and cultural heritage, including recognition of historical persons who had an important role in world civilization. Among those was Amir Temur, the warlord, politician and reformer, patron of science, education, trade, culture, and craft. Having established a great centralized state, he strengthened its power and also united many nations and people. Amir Temur's rule promoted science, education, culture, architecture, fine arts, music and poetry, laying the foundations of the Timurid Renaissance.

Former President Islam Karimov encouraged celebration of Timur, linking the Mongol ruler's achievements with the President's own style of governance. Karimov declared 1996 to be the "Year of Amir Temur", and the 660th anniversary was widely celebrated in Uzbekistan, and the republic subsequently resolved to build a state museum in central Tashkent, featuring the Timurid history.

Museum interior

== Opening ==
The ceremonial opening of the round museum structure was held on 18 October 1996 in the presence of Uzbek people and foreign guests. President Karimov stated that "The State Museum of the History of the Temurids which is opening in such a holiday conditions is the real result of the fact that in our country the historical justice towards the personality of Sahibkiran has triumphed". He compared Amir Timur Square (which is located adjacent to the museum, with a statue of Timur) to a ring, saying "the Museum is a precious stone decorating it".

== Design ==
The museum's blue cupola resembles that of the Gur-e-Amir mausoleum in Samarkand. Though the museum was built according to the traditions of medieval architecture, it satisfies modern requirements.

== Exhibits ==
A 1,000 Soʻm banknote showing the museum

There are more than 5,000 artifacts in the museum collection, with more than 2,000 displayed in museum exhibition halls. In particular, the museum displays focus on the genealogy of Amir Temur, his coming to power, the military campaigns of Sahib Kiran, diplomatic and trade relations, workmanship, city improvement and landscaping, and science and education development. There are also exhibits related to representatives of the Timurid dynasty, including maps, weapons, copper and silver coins, miniatures, rare manuscripts, potteries, and jewelry.

== Visitors ==
Amir Timur Museum at night

The museum attracts more than 2 million visitors annually. It is visited by foreign statesmen and official delegations, and more than 800 such delegations have been recorded in the museum guest book.

== International links ==
Through participation in international exhibitions, the museum has promoted its material and spiritual heritage around the world. In particular, unique exhibits were displayed at the international exhibitions as "Timurid Renaissance" in France; at Expo 2000 in Hannover, Germany; and "Bright colors: fabrics and ceramics from Central Asia" at the Powerhouse Museum in Sydney, Australia.

== Education and research ==
The museum carries out educational work with young people, encouraging respect and love towards heritage, history, and historical figures. To this end, the museum holds spiritual enlightenment activities in collaboration with schools, colleges, and lyceums.
