= Peoples' Friendship Palace =

House of culture and cinema in Tashkent, Uzbekistan

Coordinates: 41.3085°N 69.2413°E

- Xalqlar doʻstligi saroyi (Uzbek); Дворец Дружбы народов (Russian)
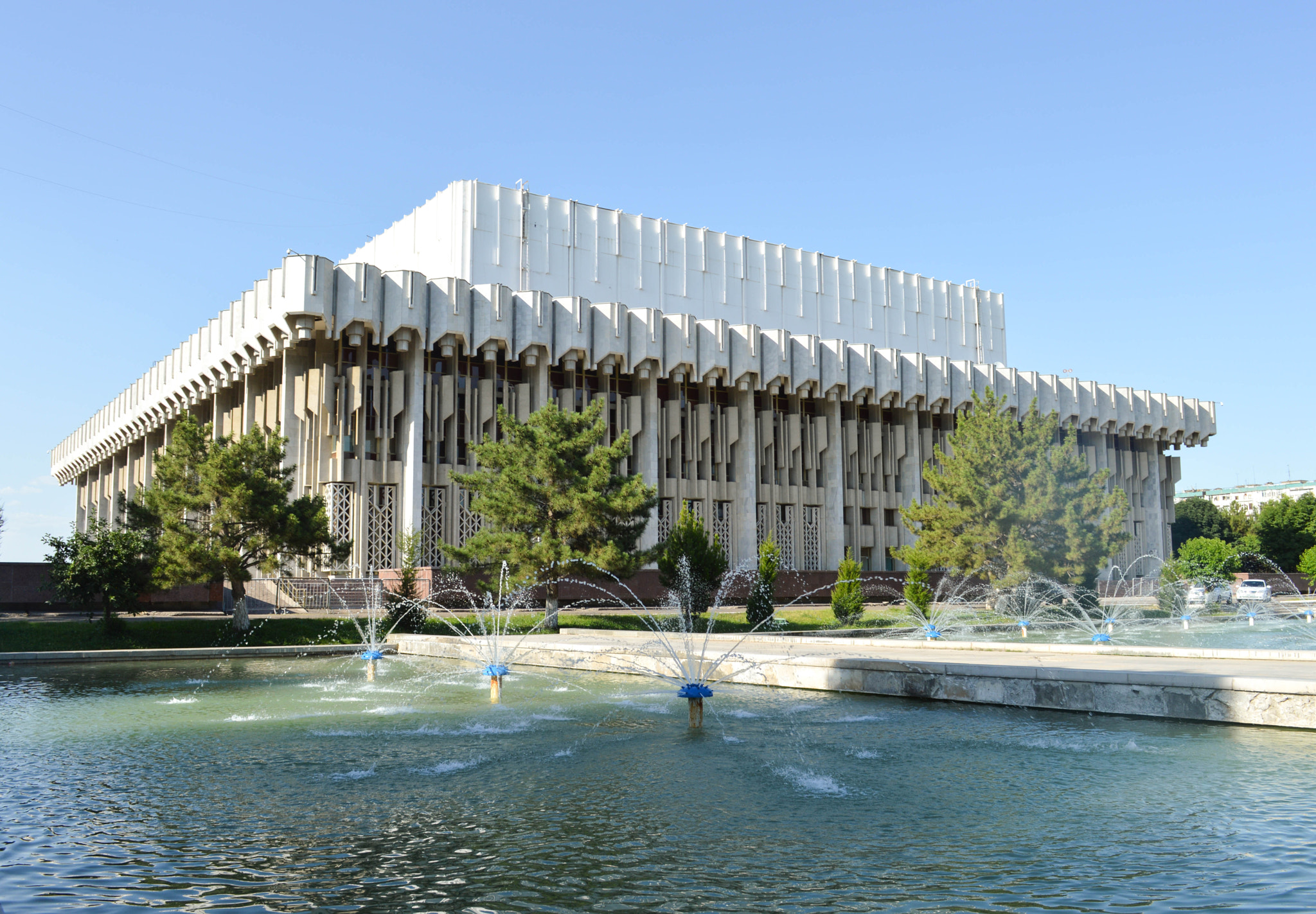
- Peoples' Friendship Palace
- Interactive map of Peoples' Friendship Palace
- Address: Furqat koʻchasi, 3 Tashkent; Uzbekistan
- Capacity: 6,000
- Type: Concert hall

Construction
- Opened: 1981
- Architect: Yevgeny Rozanov

UNESCO World Heritage Site
- Official name: Peoples' Friendship Palace (Peoples' Friendship Palace)
- Part of: Tashkent Modernist Architecture. Modernity and Tradition in Central Asia
- Criteria: Cultural: iv
- Reference: 1766
- Inscription: 2026 (48th Session)

The Peoples' Friendship Palace (Uzbek: Xalqlar doʻstligi saroyi; Russian: Дворец Дружбы народов) is the concert and cinema hall in Tashkent, capital city of Uzbekistan. The building was designed by architect Yevgeny Rozanov from the Moscow Architectural Institute who one decade prior to that worked on the city's Lenin Museum, modern day State Museum of History of Uzbekistan. The building was completed in 1981. As the largest cinema and concert hall in the country the palace provides seating for up to 6,000 people. The palace is named in the memory of solidarity and friendship of volunteers who came to the city after the devastating 1966 Tashkent earthquake. Up until 2020 the palace is represented on the 100 Uzbekistani sum banknote.

Initial plans for the new palace were developed already in 1971. The interior of the building was decorated with ceiling lights, chandeliers, large plaster panels and with three monumental florentine mosaics, named "Peoples' Friendship", "Holiday" and "Land of Flowers", on the banquet hall walls. The building's façade and decorations draw inspiration from national ornamental patterns, reminiscent of muqarnas elements found in local architecture. Local marble, as well as Nurota and G'ozg'on marbles, were used in the construction. Today, the palace is used for various events such as congresses, conferences, festivals, and concerts. Official ceremonies for foreign state representatives are also held in the concert hall. The treaty leading to the establishment of the post-Soviet regional Collective Security Treaty Organization was signed at the palace in 1992 while in 2004 the palace hosted the summit of the Shanghai Cooperation Organisation.

In April of 2008 the body known as the Republican Commission on the Standardization of Toponyms issued the decision No. 07-5-16 after which the palace was renamed to the "Palace of Arts Istiklol". The decision was nevertheless reversed in when on 26 April 2018 President of Uzbekistan Shavkat Mirziyoyev suggested reintroduction of the previous name followed by the formal decision by the Tashkent City Council of People's Deputies on May 3, 2018.

In July 2026, the Peoples' Friendship Palace, along with nine other modernist sites in Tashkent, was designated by UNESCO as a World Heritage Site.

== See also ==
- State Museum of History of Uzbekistan
- Museum of Arts of Uzbekistan
- Chorsu Bazaar
