= Siyob Bazaar =

Bazaar in Samarkand, Uzbekistan

Coordinates: 39.662°N 66.980°E

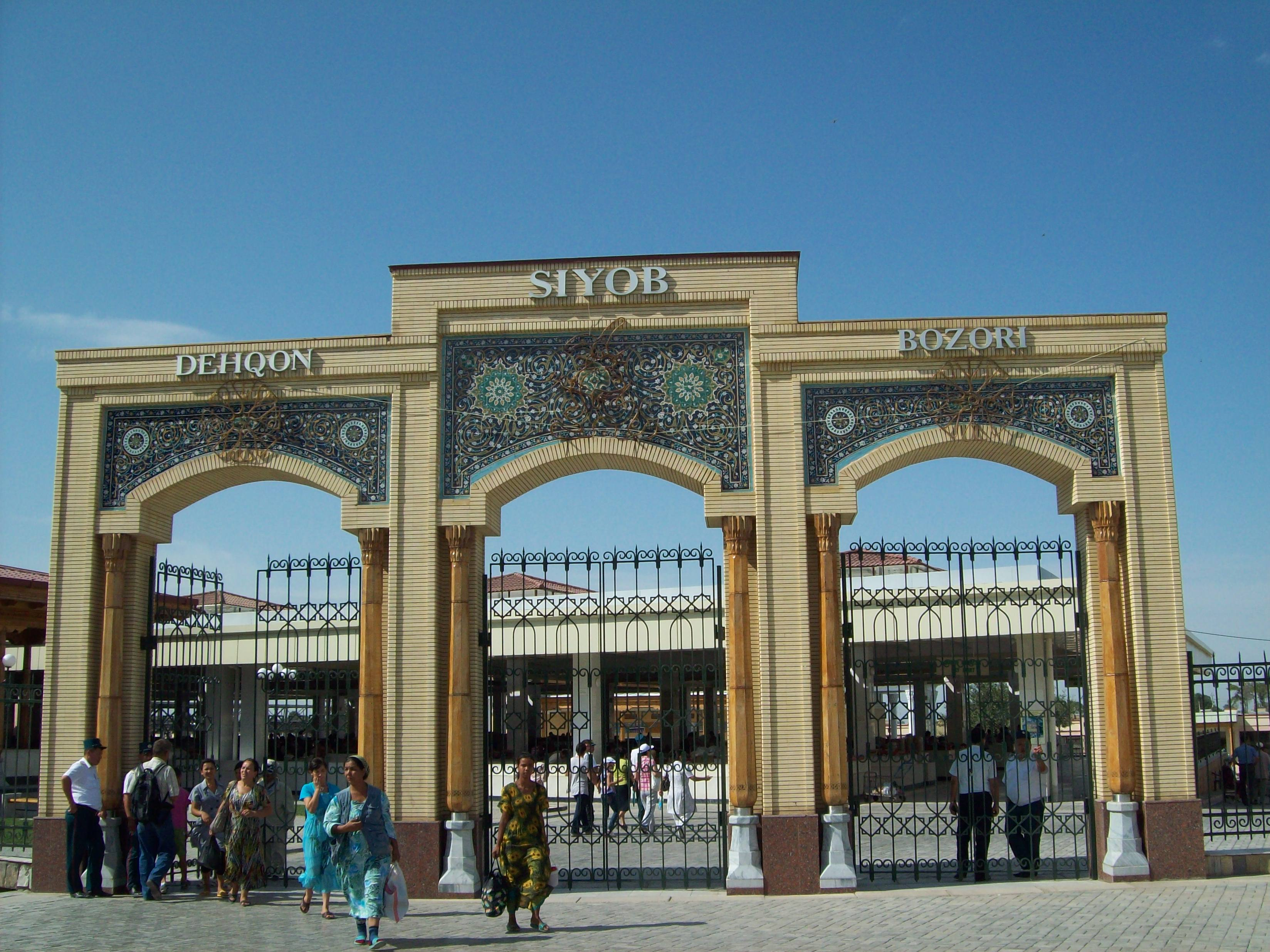
The entrance to Siyob Bazaar

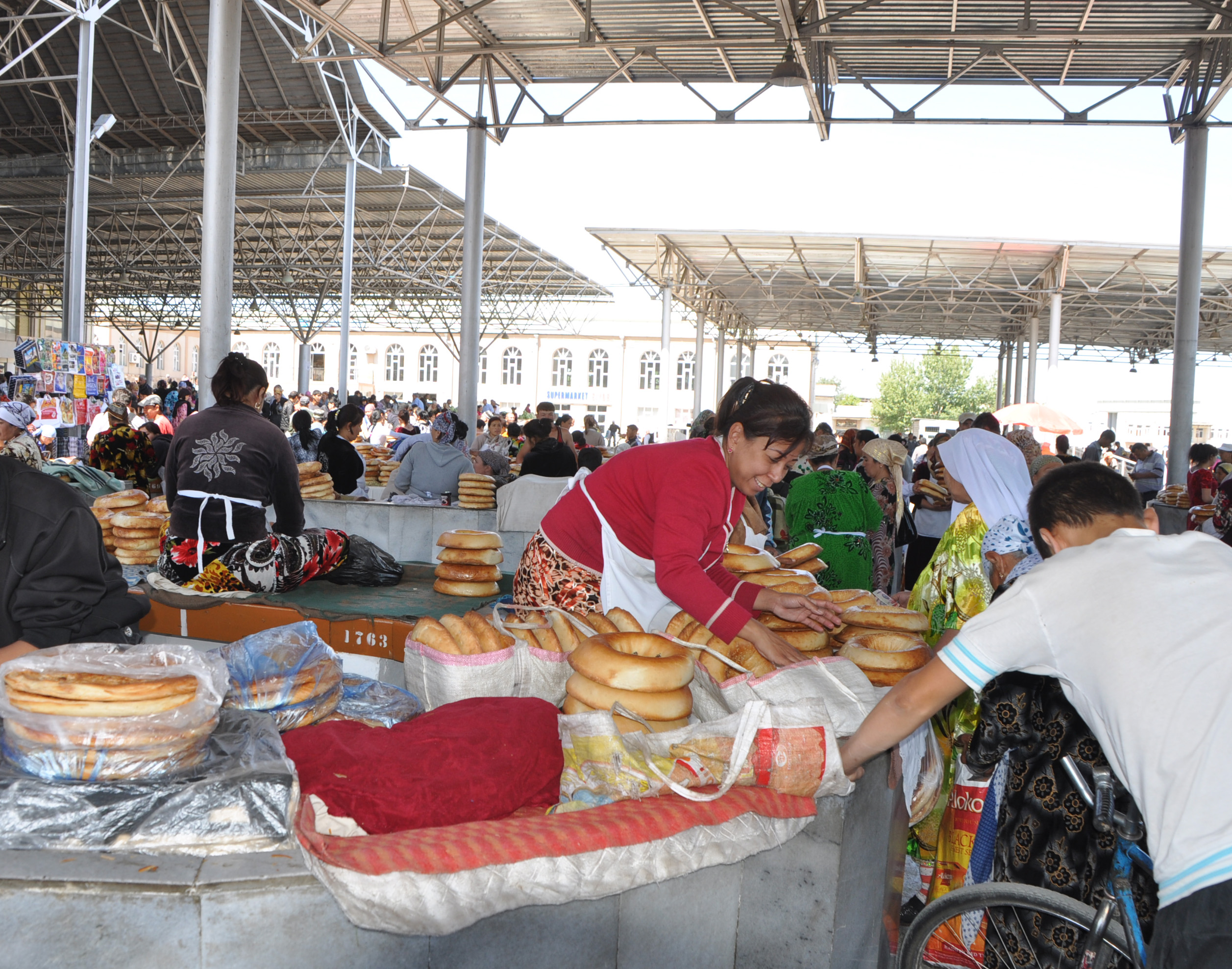
Selling Samarkand naan at Siyob Bazaar

Siyob Bazaar (Uzbek: Siyob bozori,Tajik: Бозори Сиёб), also called Siab Bazaar, is the largest bazaar in Samarkand, Uzbekistan. The building is built in the shape of a dome, under which there are several pavilions with a large number of shopping arcades. The main entrance has a triple arch lined with blue majolica. The area of the market is more than 7 hectares. Siyob Bazaar is one of the most visited places in the city. The Siyob Bazaar consists of seven large covered pavilions with counters, as well as several other large pavilions with shops.

The name of the bazaar comes from the name of one of the historical and geographical regions of the city - Siyob, and the Siyob River flowing near the bazaar. The word “Siyob” is translated from Persian and Tajik as black water/river.

Siyob Bazaar is located adjacent to the Bibi-Khanym Mosque, and is visited not only by local people but also by domestic and foreign tourists.

== Location ==
The Siyobb Bazaar is located in the central part of the city of Samarkand, in the so-called old city (Uzbek: Eski shahar; Tajik: Шаҳри кӯҳна). Located at the intersection of Tashkentskaya and Shakhi Zinda streets. A kilometer south of the Siyob Bazaar is the Registan square and ensemble, as well as the Chorsu trading dome. Near the southern and main entrance of the bazaar are the Bibi-Khanum mosque and the mausoleum of the same name. The Shah-i-Zinda mausoleum ensemble and the Khazret-Khizr mosque are located 500 meters east of the bazaar. Afrasiab is also located two kilometers north of the bazaar.

== See also ==
- Bazaar
- Bazaars in Uzbekistan
- Chorsu Bazaar (Tashkent)
- Chorsu (Samarkand)
- Market (place)
- Retail
