= Kukeldash Madrasah (Tashkent) =

Medieval madrasa built around AD 1570 by the Shaybanid rulers

Coordinates: 41°19′23″N 69°14′09″E

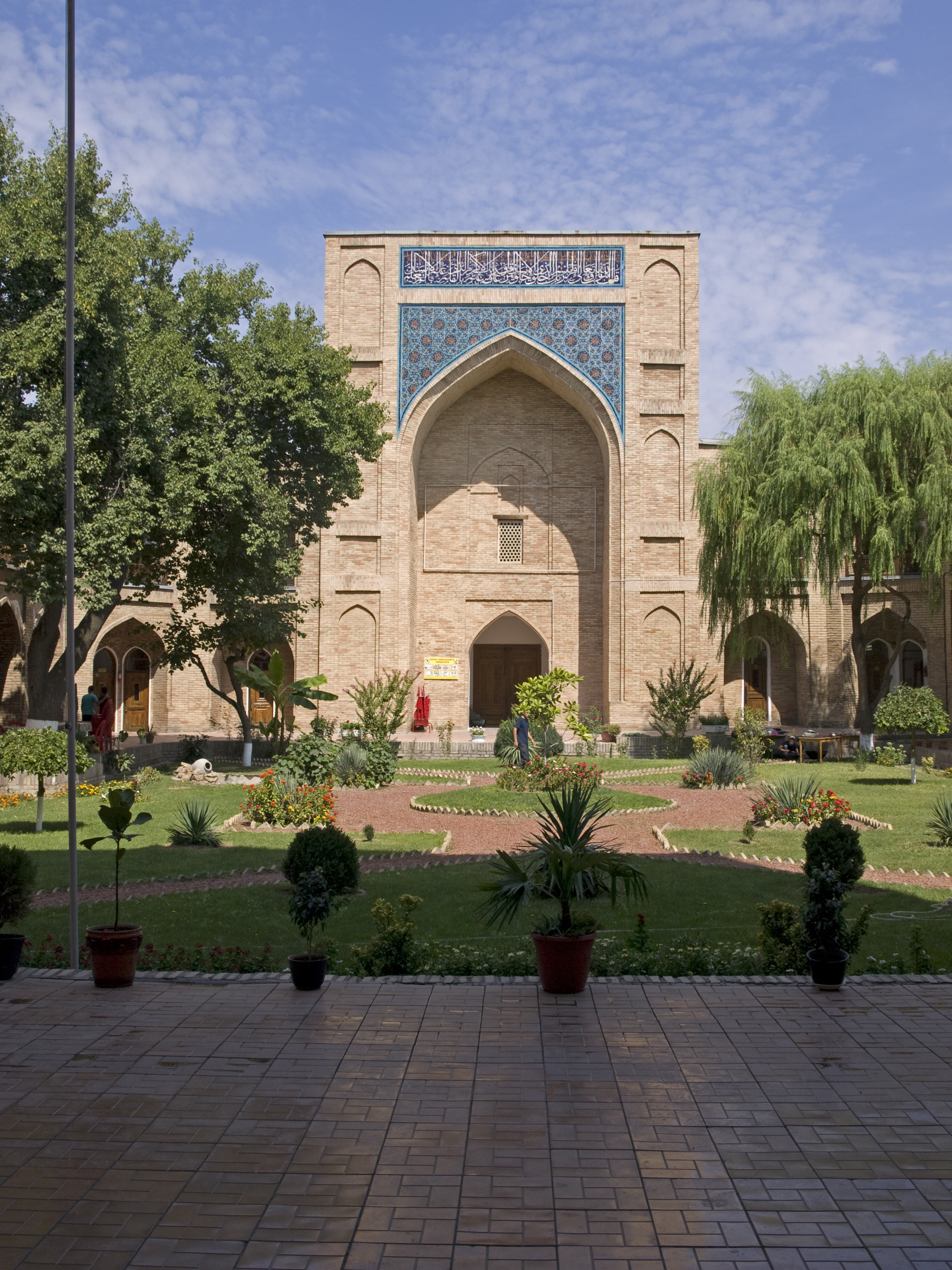
The inner yard

Kukeldash Madrasah is a medieval madrasa in Tashkent, located close to Chorsu Bazaar and Chorsu Metro station. It was built around 1570 by the Uzbek Shaybanid ruler Dervish Sultan.

The madrasah is built of yellow brick, and has a traditional square shape with a big portal and an inner yard. The walls around the inner yard contain cells inhabited by the students. The portal is 20 metres (66 ft) high and contains two towers at its sides.

In 1830-1831 the first floor of the madrasah was demolished, and the bricks were used to build the nearby Beklarbegi Madrasah. It was later restored. The madrasah was damaged by the earthquake in 1868 and subsequently reconstructed in 1902–1903. It was reconstructed again in the 1950s and became one of only several religious buildings which survived the 1966 Tashkent earthquake.

The madrasah was converted into a caravanserai in the 18th century, then it served as a fortress. In the 20th century it was a museum, first of atheism, and later of folk music. In the 1990s, the building became a madrasah again.
