= National Library of Uzbekistan =

- Alisher Navoiy nomidagi O'zbekiston Milliy Kutubxonasi (Uzbek); Национальная библиотека Узбекистана имени Алишера Навои (Russian)
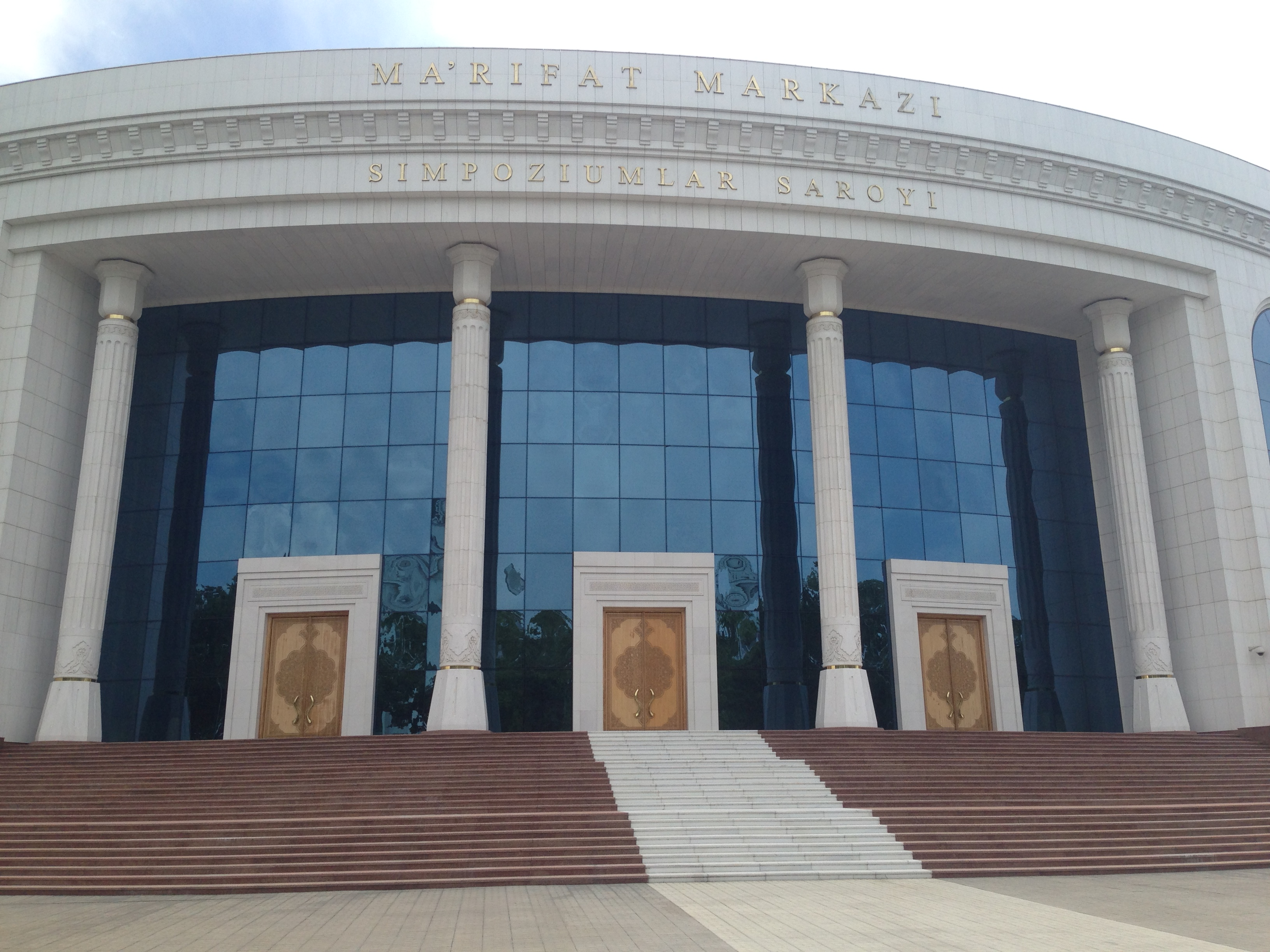
- Main building in Tashkent
- Location: Tashkent, Uzbekistan
- Type: National library
- Established: 1870 (156 years ago)
- Service area: 41.317006231669936°N 69.27480399382613°E

Collection
- Items collected: Books, journals, newspapers, magazines, official publications, sheet music, sound and music recordings, databases, maps, postage stamps, prints, drawings, manuscripts and media.
- Legal deposit: Yes

Other information
- Public transit access: 28, 30, 37, 44, 46, 57, 68, 78, 89, 91, 115, 140; Mustaqilliq Maidoni
- Website: www.natlib.uz

The National Library of Uzbekistan is the legal deposit and copyright library for Uzbekistan.

== History ==
The State Library of the Republic of Uzbekistan was founded in 1870 as the Tashkent Public Library. In 1920 this became the State Public Library of Uzbekistan, and became the legal deposit for Turkestan publications. In 1947 was named after the Uzbek poet Ali-Shir Nava'i. On April 12, 2002 it was renamed the National Library of the Republic of Uzbekistan, receiving the status of "national" under the Decree of the President of the Republic and the Resolution of the Cabinet of Ministers.

== Reading Halls ==
- Hall of Jaxon — foreign literature
- Hall of Nadir — valuable editions
- Hall of Uzbekistan — national literature
- Hall of Bunyodkor — scientific and technical literature
- Hall of Istikbol — youth and student reading room
- Hall of Tafakkur — main reading room
- Hall of Ilm — dissertations
- Hall of Ali-Shir Nava'i — literary heritage

== See also ==
- Center for Islamic Civilization
- Tashkent Children's Library
