= Amir Timur Square =

Square in Tashkent, Uzbekistan

Coordinates: 41°18′41″N 69°16′47″E

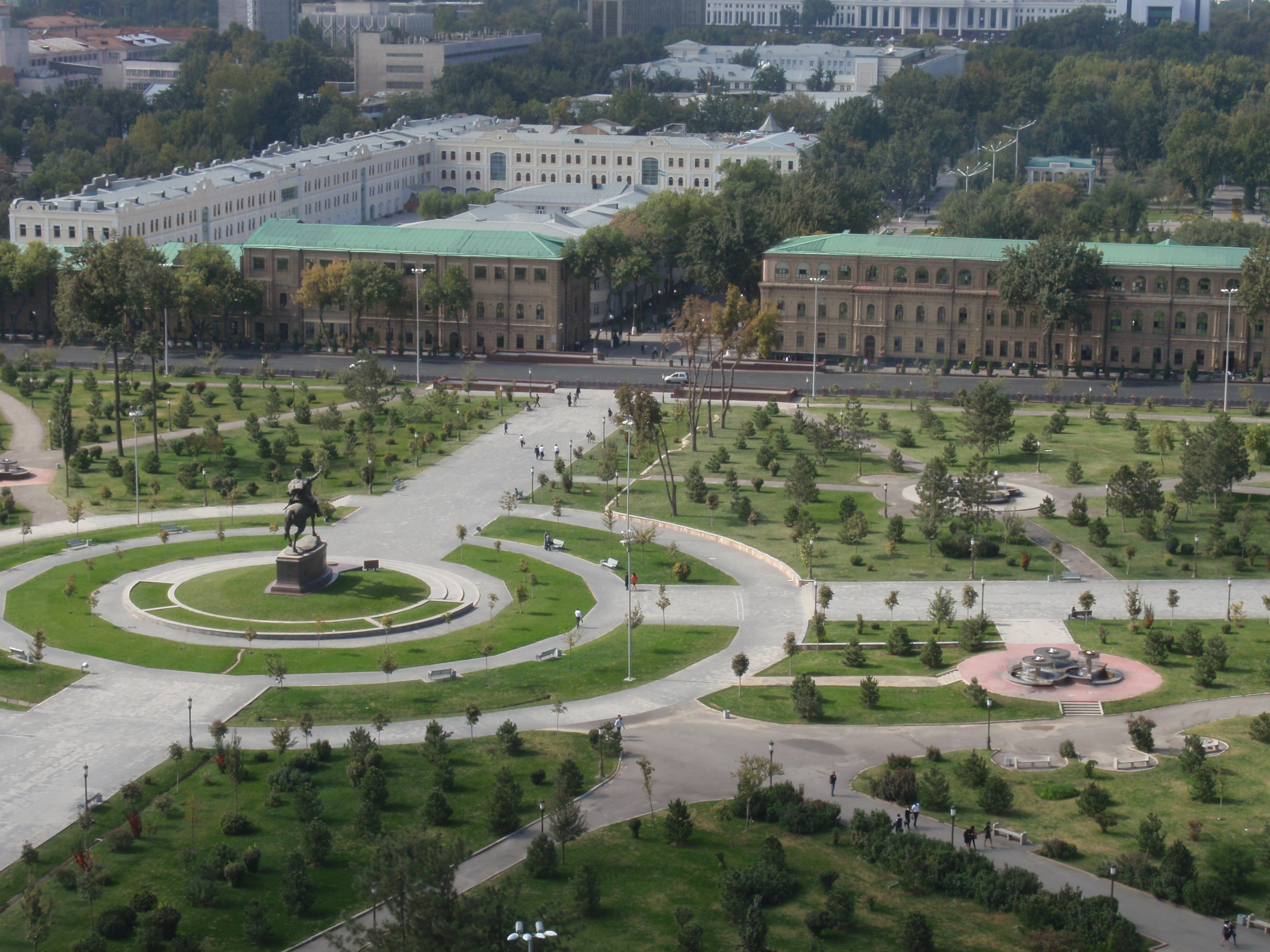
Amir Timur Square, Tashkent, Uzbekistan

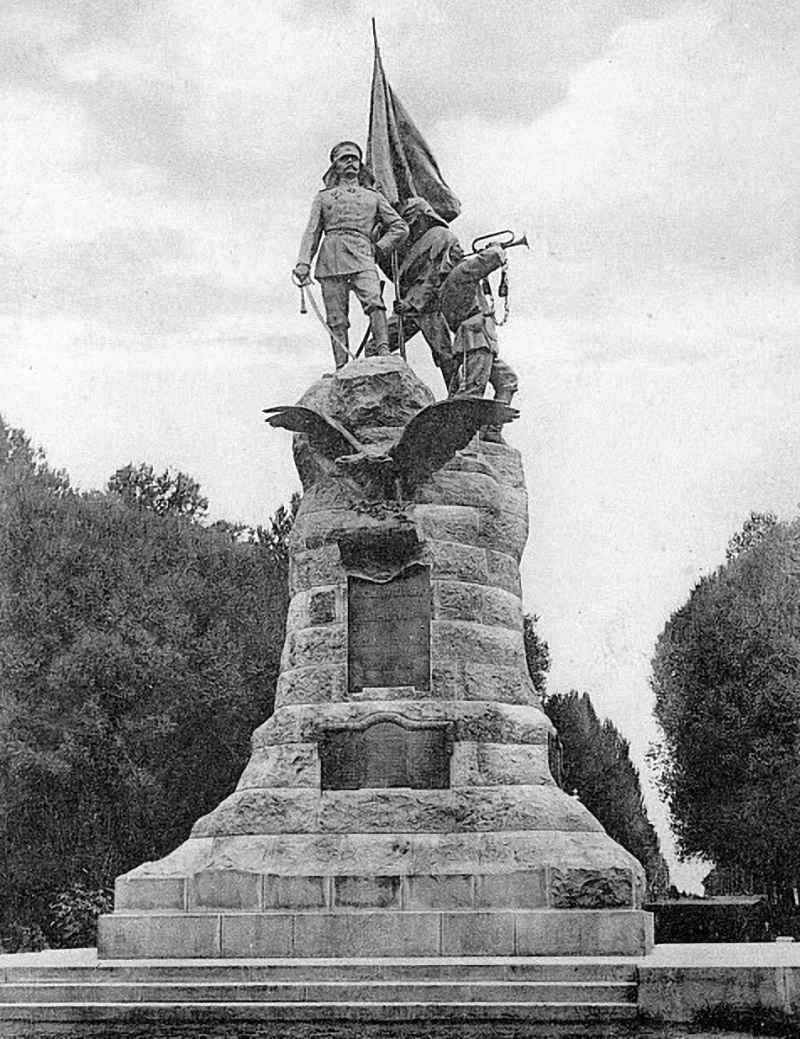
The statue of Konstantin Petrovich von Kaufmann (1913)

The Amir Timur Square (Uzbek: Amir Temur xiyoboni, Амир Тимур Хиёбони) is the main town square in Tashkent, Uzbekistan.

== History ==
The predecessor of the square is a park built during the first governor-general of the Russian Turkestan era. The square was at the intersection of two main streets, Moscow Street (now Amir Timur Street) and Kaufmann Street (now Milza Ulugh Beg Street), under the name of Constantinov Square. It was built in 1882 by Nikolai Ulyanov (Ульянов, Николай Фёдорович Ульянов) working under Mikhail Chernyayev.

After the 1917 Russian Revolution, the square was renamed the Revolution Square. While Joseph Stalin's statue was placed in the square during the late 1940s, it was removed due to the October 1961 resolution that all Stalin's statues would be removed. In 1968, a statue of Karl Marx was erected.

After the independence of Uzbekistan, the square was renamed the Amir Timur Square in 1994, and Timur's statue was placed on the site. Adjacent to the park in the south, the Amir Timur Museum was built in 1996.

== See also ==
- Tashkent
