= National Palace of Cinematography of Uzbekistan =

UNESCO listed cinema in Uzbekistan

- Oʻzbekiston Milliy kino sanʼati saroyi (Uzbek)
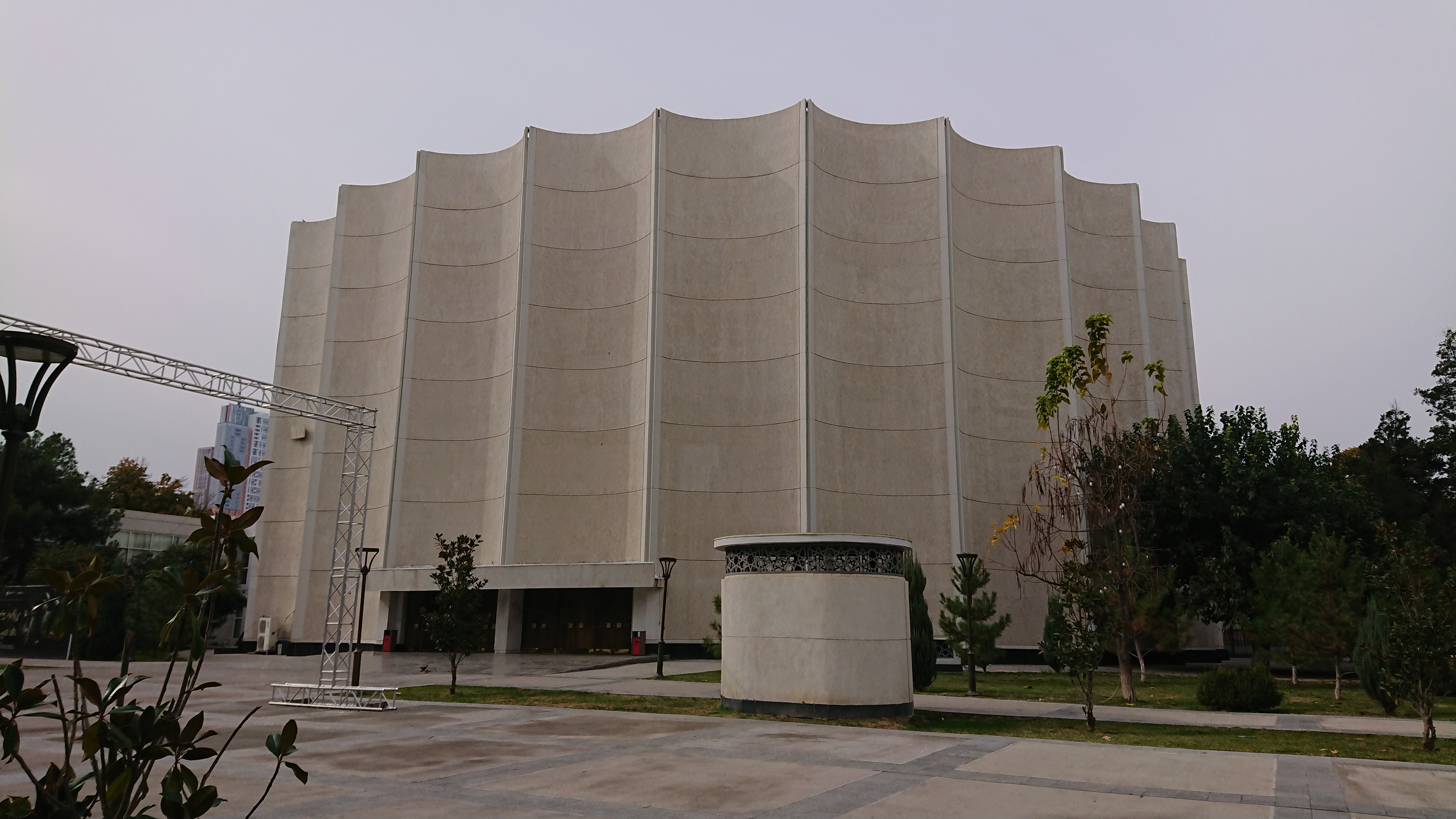
- The National Palace of Cinematography of Uzbekistan

- Location within West and Central Asia Location within Uzbekistan
- 41.319446°N 69.2596106°E
- Location: 15 Navoi Avenue; Tashkent, Uzbekistan

History
- Built: 1964

Site notes
- Architect(s): Sergo Sutyagin, Vladimir Beryozin, Yuriy Khaldeyev, Dmitry Shuvaev

UNESCO World Heritage Site
- Official name: Alisher Navoi Cinema Palace (Palace of Arts, Panoramic Cinema)
- Part of: Tashkent Modernist Architecture. Modernity and Tradition in Central Asia
- Criteria: Cultural: iv
- Reference: 1766
- Inscription: 2026 (48th Session)

The National Palace of Cinematography of Uzbekistan (Uzbek: Oʻzbekiston Milliy kino sanʼati saroyi), also called the Alisher Navoi Cinema Palace, and formerly the Panoramic Cinema and Palace of Arts, is a cinema in Tashkent built in 1964 in the modernist style. It was the first cinema in Central Asia built for viewing widescreen films.

In July 2026, the National Palace of Cinematography of Uzbekistan, along with nine other modernist sites in Tashkent, was designated by UNESCO as a World Heritage Site.

== History ==
Planning for the National Palace of Cinematography of Uzbekistan began in 1960; the building was constructed between 1962 and 1964, and designed to host events including film screenings, concerts, and other performances. The theater was equipped with capability to show Kinopanorama, a Soviet wide-screen film format.

In the 1966 Tashkent earthquake, the building was largely undamaged. From 1968 to its conclusion in 1988, it hosted the Tashkent International Film Festival. An addition was built from 1972 to 1976, containing a smaller cinema screen.

In 1991, the building was formally named after Timurid poet Alisher Navoi. Presently, the foyer building is now host to the Uzbekistan Museum of Cinema.

=== Preservation ===
In 1978, the National Palace of Cinematography was listed by the Uzbekistan government as a historical or culturally significant site.

In 2018, the brutalist House of Cinema, another Soviet-era cinema in Tashkent, was demolished. The loss of the cinema was among the motivating factors for the Uzbekistan Arts and Culture Foundation (ACDF) to initiate the Tashkent Modernism XX/XXI research project in 2021, which documented several modernist buildings in Tashkent including the National Palace of Cinematography. This report formed the basis for submission of the National Palace of Cinematography to the UNESCO Tentative List in 2024. In July 2026, the National Palace of Cinematography of Uzbekistan was officially designated by UNESCO as a World Heritage Site.

== Architecture ==
The National Palace of Cinematography is composed of three volumes, and displays a "distinctly modernist vocabulary." The main cinema hall, which hosts a 2300 seat auditorium, consists of a cylindrical pavilion composed of prefabricated concrete slabs, built to resemble a Doric column. Its rounded shape was intended to host a large curved panoramic screen measuring 34 meters wide by 14 meters tall. The central volume sits on a dark ceramic base, which grants the cinema a sense of elevation over the surrounding plaza.

The second volume is a two story glass foyer which serves as the primary entryway for the cinema. The large foyer windows frame a view of the city and were originally shaded by brise soleil. It features a concessions area and is decorated with a fresco by Arnold Gan.

The third volume, built between 1972 and 1976 is composed of stone and brick and contains a smaller, 550 seat cinema along with exhibition space. The choice of building material allows the addition to flow neatly into the mahalla immediately adjacent to the cinema.

In the early 2000s, substantial alterations were made to the building, including removal of the brise soleil and an occllusion of the transparent windows banding the foyer.
