= Chorsu (Samarkand) =

Coordinates: 39°39′20″N 66°58′36″E

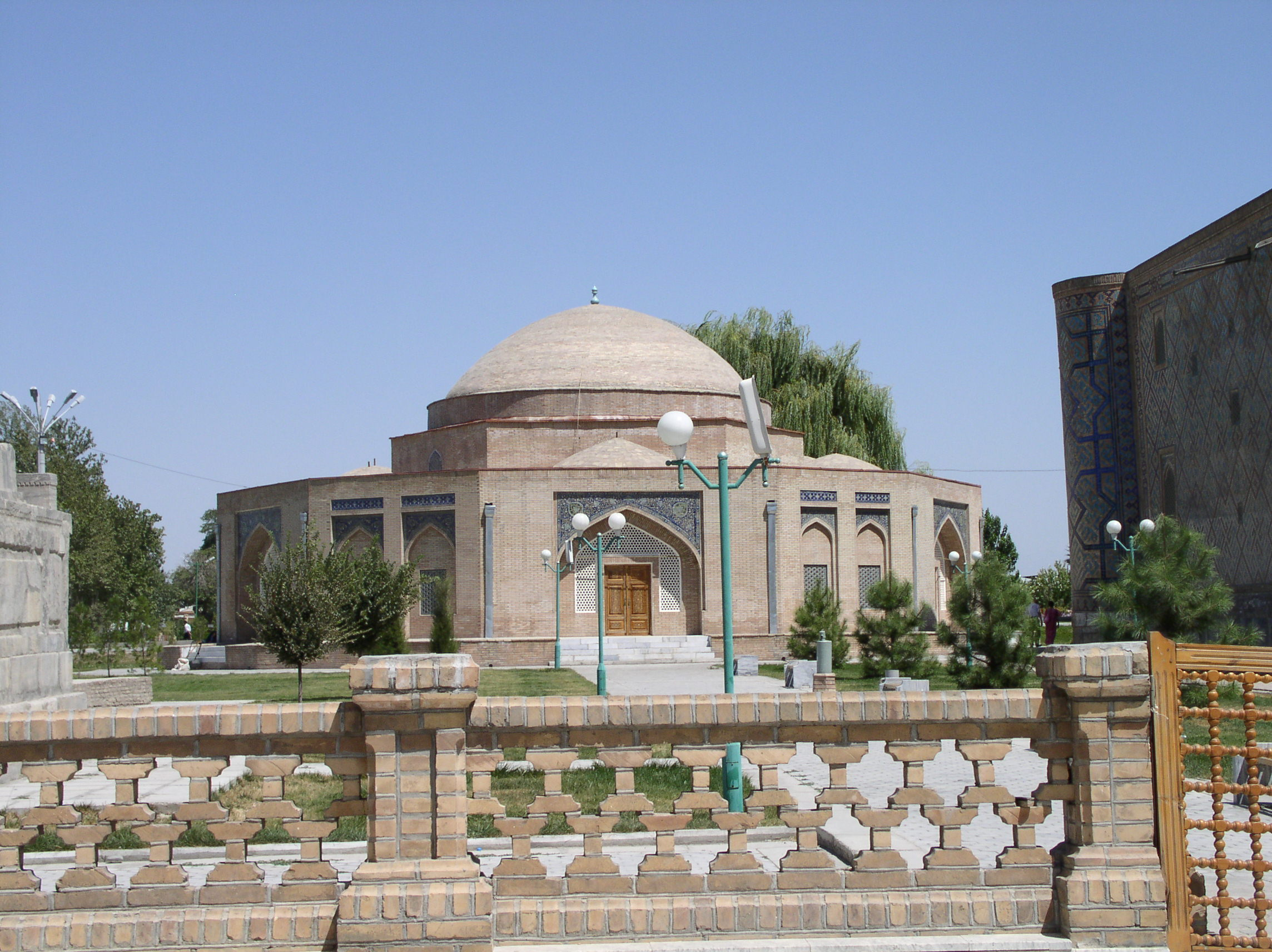
Chorsu in Samarkand, Uzbekistan

Chorsu (Persian: چارسو, Uzbek: Chorsu and Russian: Чорсу), also called Charsu, in Samarkand, Uzbekistan, is a domed, hexagonal shape building with a large central dome surrounded by six smaller domes. Chorsu is located at southeast of the Registan at the intersection of the roads connecting Samarkand, Tashkent, Bukhara, and Shahrisabz. Chorsu is a word of Tajik origin meaning "crossroads," referring to this intersection. The building is old, with a rich centuries-old history. It is included in the UNESCO World Heritage List along with the rest of the historical part of the city.

== History ==
Chorsu is located in the southern-eastern part of Registan, connecting the roads to Samarkand, Tashkent, Bukhara, and Shahrisabz. It is a historical building monument constructed with the funds of the Bukhara Emir Shohmurad. Initially, there was a market in the place of Chorsu, which was built in the 15th century. In the past, the market was located where the Siyob Bazaar is now, next to the Bibi-Khanym Mosque. Today, the building functions as a museum and gallery. Together with other historical and archaeological monuments of Samarkand, Chorsu has been included in the UNESCO World Heritage List for Uzbekistan. The name Chorsu can be translated from Persian as "four roads".

During the rule of Emir Shohmurad, in 1785, the current building was constructed, and it received the name Chorsu because it has four entrances. The walls of the building are in the form of a prism with 12 corners. The building features a large central dome and four smaller domes on top of the entrance section. Until the beginning of the 20th century, the building was used by merchants and traders to sell clothing, headgear, fabrics, medicines, books, and various other goods. Around the building, there were shops and smaller stalls.

From the Soviet era onwards, the monument building was adapted for memorial purposes, and it was used for selling small items and souvenirs. In 2005, the ownership of "Chorsu" was transferred to the Uzbekistan Academy of Arts. In 2005, the trading dome was fully restored, and a three-meter layer of soil was removed to raise the building's height. Today, the Chorsu trading dome serves as a monument and houses a museum and an art gallery. Over the years, Chorsu has been visited by numerous famous Uzbek and foreign artists and sculptors who displayed their works.

== See also ==
- Bazaars in Uzbekistan
- Siyob Bazaar (Samarkand)
- Chorsu Bazaar (Tashkent)
