= Chorsu Bazaar =

Bazaar in Tashkent, Uzbekistan

Coordinates: 41°19′36″N 69°14′06″E

- Chorsu bozori
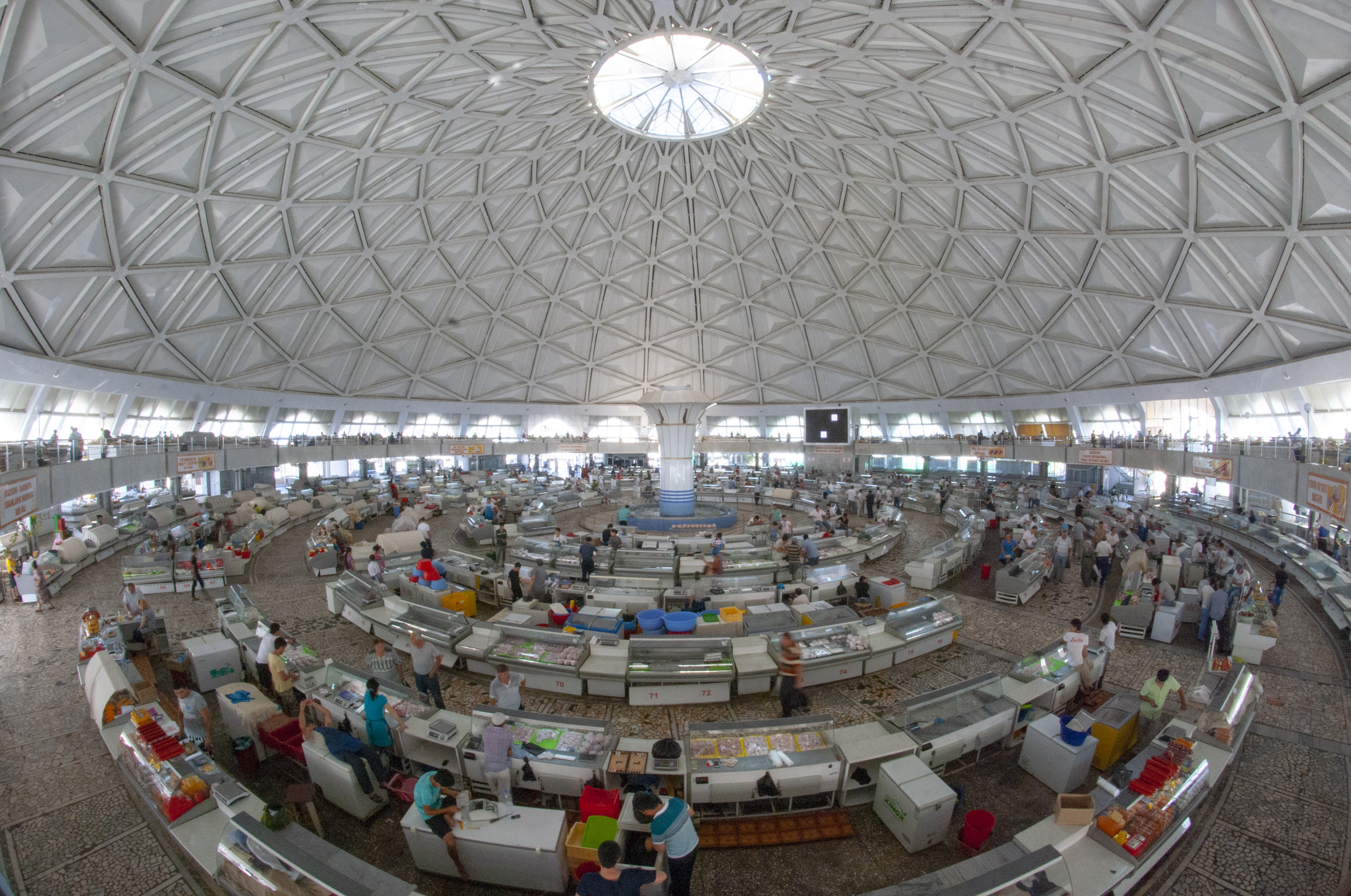
- General view of the Chorsu Bazaar building

General information
- Architectural style: Soviet architectural modernism
- Location: Tashkent, Uzbekistan

Other information
- Public transit: Chorsu

UNESCO World Heritage Site
- Official name: Chorsu Market (Chorsu Bazaar)
- Part of: Tashkent Modernist Architecture. Modernity and Tradition in Central Asia
- Criteria: Cultural: iv
- Reference: 1766
- Inscription: 2026 (48th Session)

Chorsu Bazaar (Note: Uzbek: Chorsu bozori, Чорсу бозори; Russian: базар Чорсу), also called Charsu Bazaar, is the traditional bazaar located in the center of the old town of Tashkent, the capital city of Uzbekistan. Under its blue-colored domed building and the adjacent areas, all daily necessities are sold.

== Overview ==
Chorsu Bazaar is located across the street from Chorsu Station of the Tashkent Metro, near Kukeldosh Madrasah. "Chorsu" is a word from the Persian, meaning "crossroads" or "four streams". Kukeldash Madrasah, built around 1570, is located at the edge of the bazaar. The modern building and the characteristic blue dome were designed by Vladimir Azimov, Sabir Adylov et al. in 1980, as a late example of Soviet Modernism style. In July 2026, the Chorsu Bazaar, along with nine other modernist sites in Tashkent, was designated by UNESCO as a World Heritage Site.

== History ==
The market ensemble was built between 1985 and 1990 on Sakichmon Street, on the block where Tashkent's oldest bazaar had stood, and is regarded as one of the most representative buildings of the second generation of Soviet modernism in the city. Its main dome has a diameter of nearly 90 metres, a span that posed a structural challenge in a seismic region and led the engineers to combine steel with reinforced concrete in the lower part of the structure.

On top of the podium, seven smaller cupolas and undulating canopies organise the different areas of the market. The 1980s general plan for the area also included a hotel in the northern part of the market, which was never built. The market's history as a trading place is traditionally dated back more than 2,000 years, and it grew during the Timurid period of the 14th and 15th centuries.

== Gallery ==
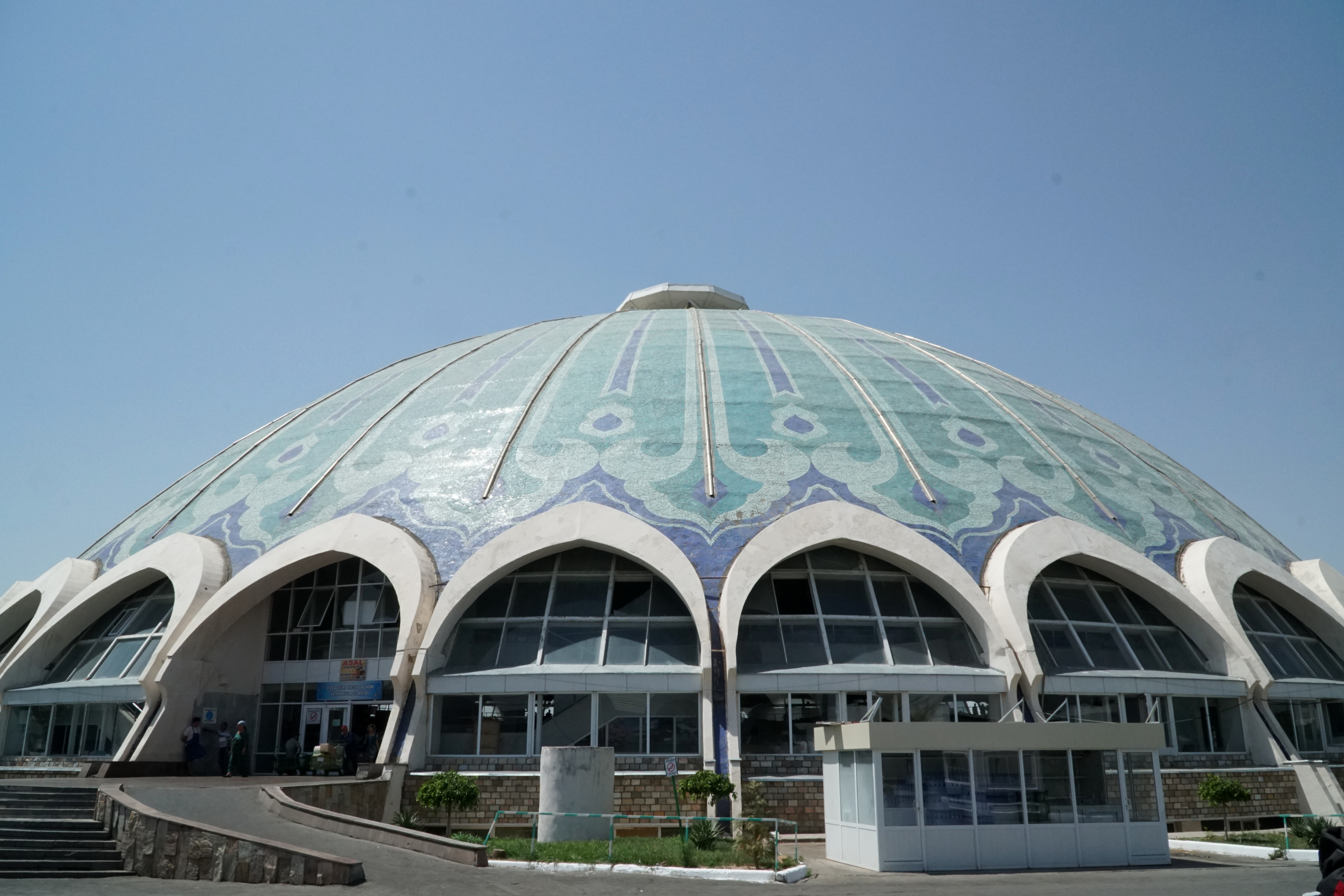
The characteristic blue dome of the bazaar

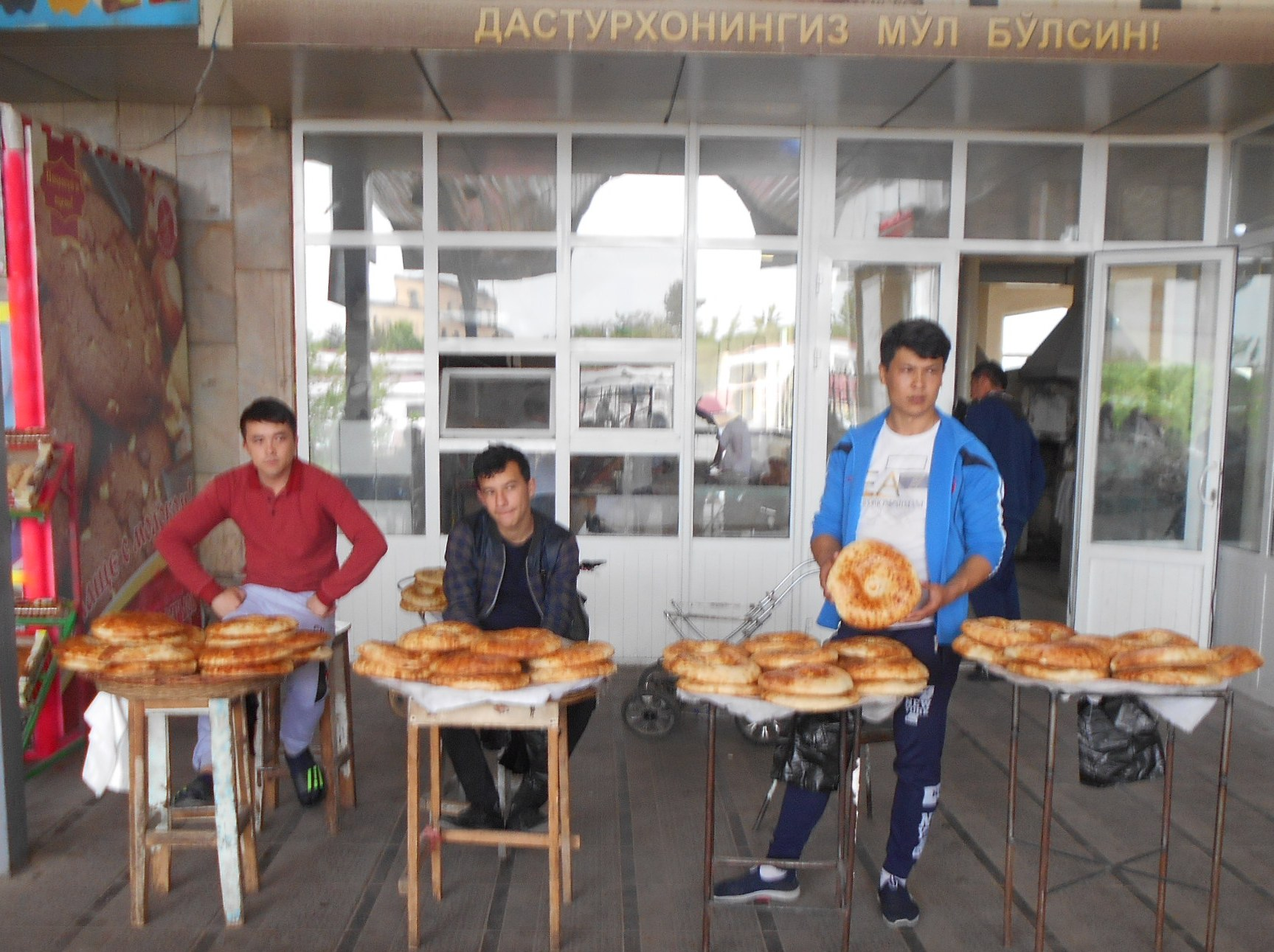
Bread sellers

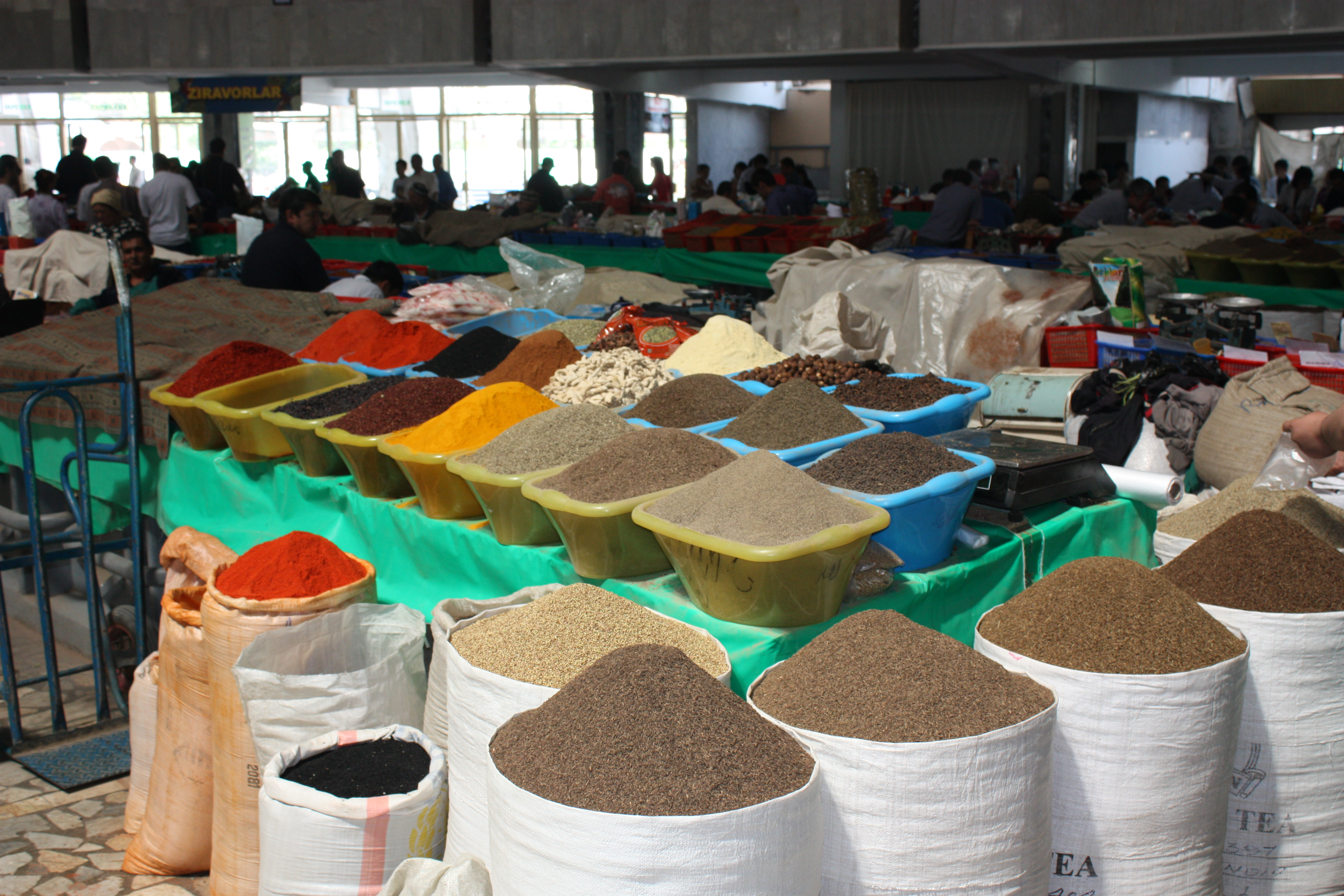
Spices on sale

== See also ==
- Bazaar
- Chorsu (Samarkand)
- Market (place)
- Retail
- Siyob Bazaar (Samarkand)
