= 5-Bekat =

5-bekat, which literally means "Station 5", was a provisional name of two different stations of Tashkent Metro:

- Chinor, on Chilonzor Line;
- Rohat, on Circle Line/30th anniversary of the independence of Uzbekistan Line.
