= Yangiobod (Tashkent Metro) =

Tashkent Metro Station

General information
- Location: Tashkent; Uzbekistan
- Coordinates: 41°15′19.7″N 69°21′29.1″E
- System: Tashkent Metro
- Tracks: 2

History
- Opened: 30 August 2020

Services
| Preceding station | Tashkent Metro | Following station |
|---|---|---|
| Rohat towards Texnopark | Circle Line | Qoʻyliq towards Qipchoq |
Location

Yangiobod is a Tashkent Metro station on Circle Line. It was opened on 30 August 2020 as part of the inaugural section of the line between Texnopark and Qoʻyliq. The station is located between Rohat and Qoʻyliq.

The original name of the station was 6-Bekat, which means "Station 6", and in August 2023 Yangiobod, together with other stations of the line, was given a proper name.
