= Rohat (Tashkent Metro) =

Tashkent Metro Station

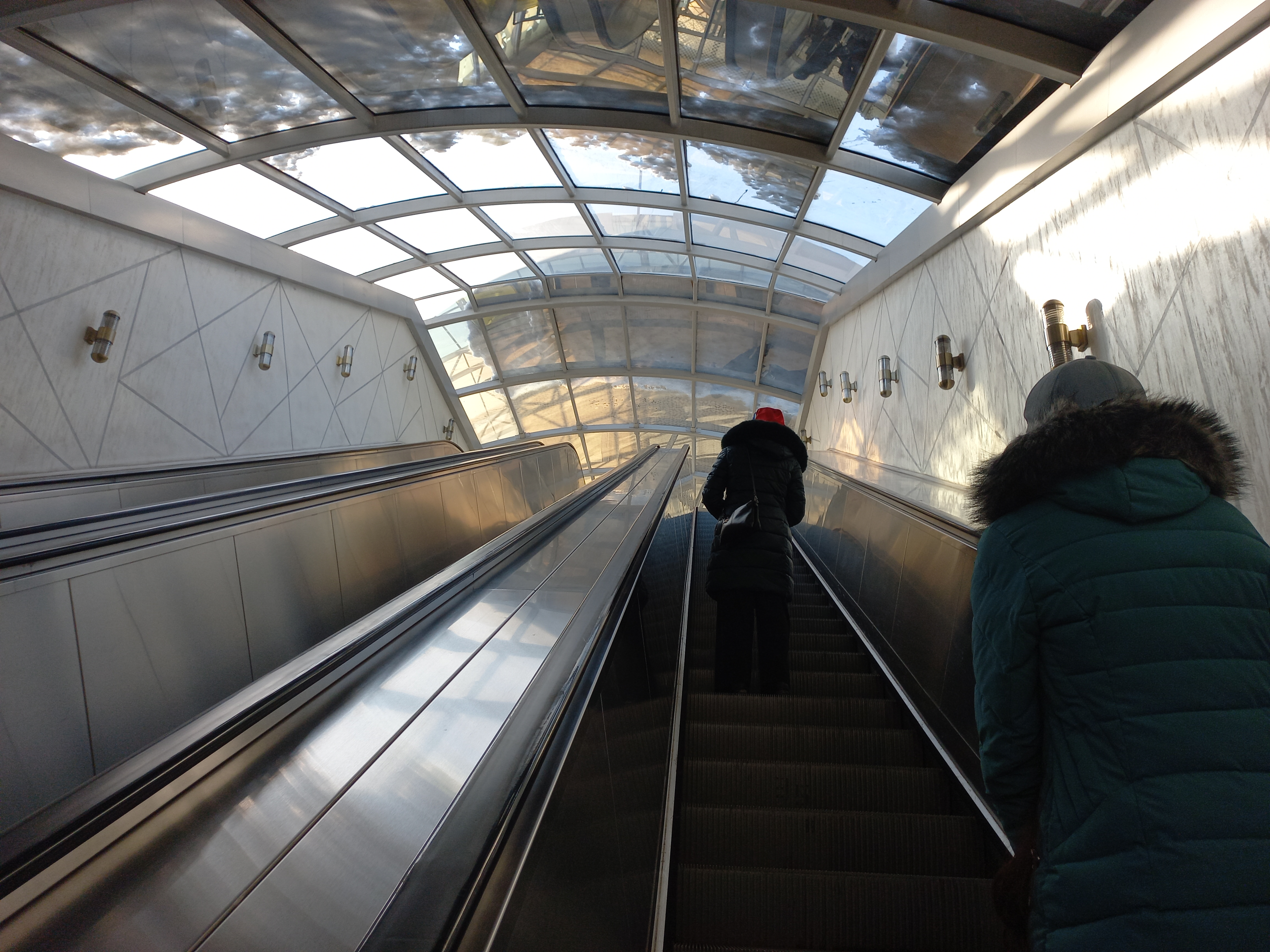

General information
- Location: Tashkent; Uzbekistan
- Coordinates: 41°15′55.9″N 69°21′53.7″E
- System: Tashkent Metro
- Tracks: 2

History
- Opened: 30 August 2020

Services
Preceding station	Tashkent Metro	Following station
Olmos towards Texnopark	Circle Line	Yangiobod towards Qipchoq
Location

Rohat is a Tashkent Metro station on Circle Line. It was opened on 30 August 2020 as part of the inaugural section of the line between Texnopark and Qoʻyliq. The station is located between Olmos and Yangiobod.

The original name of the station was 5-Bekat, which means "Station 5". At the same time, there was another 5-Bekat station in Tashkent, which later became Chinor. In August 2023 Rohat, together with other stations of the line, was given a proper name.
