= In Pursuit of Spring =

- Promotional poster
- Uzbek: Bahorni quvib
- Directed by: Ayub Shahobiddinov
- Screenplay by: Erkin A’zam
- Starring: Ra'no Shodiyeva; Ilhom Berdiyev; Anvar Kartayev; Ra'no Ahmadjonova
- Cinematography: Diyor Ismatov
- Edited by: Ziyodulla Adashev
- Music by: Ubaydullo Karimov
- Production company: Uzbekfilm
- Release date: 6 July 2025 (China)
- Running time: 82 minutes
- Country: Uzbekistan
- Language: Uzbek

In Pursuit of Spring (Uzbek: Bahorni quvib) is a 2025 Uzbek psychological drama film directed by Ayub Shahobiddinov and produced by Uzbekfilm. The film starring Ra'no Shodiyeva, Ilhom Berdiyev, and Anvar Kartayev had its world premiere at SCO Film Festival in China, where it won Best Actress award. The film explores the story of a woman returning to her homeland after years of exile, confronting the emotional consequences of loss, memory, and social judgment.

In Pursuit of Spring received critical acclaim and international recognition, including awards for Best Actress and Best Screenplay at the VI Lendoc Film Festival in 2025. It was presented at 56th International Film Festival of India in 'Cinema of World category' on 23 November 2025. The film was also presented at 43rd Fajr International Film Festival’s Eastern Vista Section in Iran on 28 November 2025.

== Plot ==
Rohat Shukurova returns to a remote village of Archali after decades of exile and personal hardship. Haunted by memories of Soviet-era scandal that destroyed her youth and love, she must face the social and emotional scars left behind. As she reconnects with her community, the film unfolds as an intimate portrait of resilience, forgiveness, and the search for peace.

== Cast ==
- Ra'no Shodiyeva as Rohat Shukurova
  - Ra'no Ahmadjonova as young Rohat Shukurova
- Ilhom Berdiyev as Qudrat Ramazonov and his son Nodir Ramazonov
- Anvar Kartayev as Khojikulov
- Farina Oybekzoda as Rohatoy
- Bahora Arslonova as Aygul, wife of Nodir Ramazonov
- Anna Petyayeva as Larisa Shevchenko

== Crew ==
- Director – Ayub Shahobiddinov
- Screenplay – Erkin A’zam
- Production design – Shamshetdin Ibraymov
- Cinematography – Diyor Ismatov
- Editing – Ziyodulla Adashev
- Music – Ubaydullo Karimov
- Production company – Uzbekfilm

== Production ==
The screenplay was written by the prominent Uzbek author Erkin A’zam, adapting themes of moral endurance and the human cost of exile.

Filming took place primarily in Boysun District, known for its traditional landscapes and historical depth. Director Ayub Shahobiddinov emphasized authenticity in visual tone and atmosphere, supported by cinematographer Diyor Ismatov.

The production was commissioned by the Kinematografiya agentligi (Cinematography Agency of Uzbekistan) and produced through the national studio Uzbekfilm.

== Release ==
Bahorni Quvib premiered at Bishkek International Film Festival in Kyrgyzstan in June 2025. It was subsequently screened at several international film festivals throughout 2025.

Date	Festival Name	Location
June 2025	Bishkek International Film Festival	Kyrgyzstan
July 2025	SCO Film Festival	China
August 2025	International Film Festival Antares	Russia
August 2025	Lendoc Film Festival (LEFF)	Russia
September 2025	Arts Lumière Indonesia Festival	Indonesia
October 2025	Korkut Ata Film Festival	Kazakhstan
October 2025	Toji Somon International Film Festival	Tajikistan
November 2025	Listapad Film Festival	Belarus
November 2025	International Film Festival of India (IFFI)	India
November 2025	Diamond Butterfly Awards	Russia
November 2025	Fajr International Film Festival	Iran
December 2025	Toronto Global Film Festival	Canada
January 2026	Dhaka International Film Festival	Bangladesh

== Reception ==
=== Critical response ===
Uzbek critics praised the film’s emotional depth and naturalistic portrayal of rural life. The cultural magazine Oyina described it as “a deeply human story about repentance and reconciliation,” highlighting Ra'no Shodiyeva’s performance as one of her career bests. The film uses psychological realism and symbolic imagery to depict the inner conflict between memory and forgiveness. Its pacing and cinematography reflect the passing of time and emotional isolation. Director Shahobiddinov’s minimalist style focuses on internal struggle rather than external conflict, making In Pursuit of Spring a quiet yet powerful entry in contemporary Uzbek cinema.

=== Accolades ===
In Pursuit of Spring received numerous awards in different categories throughout its premiere in festivals.

Year	Award	Category	Recipient	Result	Ref.
2025	III Bishkek International Film Festival	Best Film	Ayub Shahobiddinov	Nominated	
2025	SCO Film Festival	Best Actress	Ra'no Shodiyeva	Won	
2025	II Antares International Film Festival	Best Feature Film	Ayub Shahobiddinov	Won	
2025	II Antares International Film Festival	Best Male Actor	Ilhom Berdiyev	Won	
2025	II Antares International Film Festival	Best Screenplay	Erkin A'zam	Won	
2025	II Antares International Film Festival	Best Male Supporting Actor	Anvar Karteyev	Won	
2025	VI Lendoc International Film Festival	Best Screenplay	Erkin A'zam	Won	
2025	VI Lendoc International Film Festival	Best Actress	Ra'no Shodiyeva	Won	
2025	Diamond Butterfly	Best Supporting Actor	Anvar Kartayev	Won	
2025	Oltin humo	Best screenplay	Erkin A’zam	Won	
2025	Oltin humo	Best Sound Director	Ulugbek Abdusoatov	Won	
