= Oʻtov =

Oʻtov (film)
- Directed by: Ayub Shahobiddinov
- Written by: Yolqin To‘ychiyev
- Starring: Nozim Toʻlaxoʻjayev; Aziz Rametov; Raʼno Shodiyeva; Xayrulla Saʼdiyev
- Production company: Cinematography Agency of Uzbekistan
- Release date: 2007
- Running time: 77 minutes
- Language: Uzbek

Oʻtov (English: The Yurt) is a 2007 Uzbek drama film directed by Ayub Shahobiddinov. Based on a screenplay by Yolqin Toʻychiyev, the film stars Nozim Toʻlaxoʻjayev, Raʻno Shodiyeva, Aziz Rametov, and Xayrulla Saʼdiyev in the lead roles.

== Plot ==
Ubaydullo and his son, Javohir, live in a yurt at the foot of the mountains. Ubaydullo's family has a painful history: his grandfather was overthrown by the Soviet regime, and his father was exiled to Siberia as an "enemy of the people." Carrying this historical trauma, Ubaydullo lives a quiet life—praying and herding sheep. He tries his best to shield his son from the outside world by refusing to let him pursue higher education and keeping him from serving in the army. However, Javohir resents his father's overprotective nature and feels suffocated. Meanwhile, Javohir's heartbreak deepens when the girl he loves marries someone else. Tension peaks one day when Javohir brings a television home, only for his father to smash and bury it.

Frustrated, Javohir secretly leaves home to join the army. During his absence, Ubaydullo marries a mute young woman named Zaynab, and the couple later welcomes a baby girl. Javohir eventually returns from the military, but he has fallen into drug addiction. Desperate to cure and save his son, Ubaydullo resorts to an extreme measure and buries him in the ground up to his neck to detoxify him. Despite these severe struggles, the film ends on a hopeful note, showing the family eventually finding peace and living happily together.

== Cast ==
=== Lead Roles ===
- Nozim Toʻlaxoʻjayev – Sayyid Ubaydullo (full name: Sayyid Nurmuhammad oʻgʻli Sayyid Ubaydullo)
- Aziz Rametov – Javohir, Ubaydullo's son
- Raʼno Shodiyeva – Zaynab, the mute girl
- Xayrulla Saʼdiyev – the inspector

=== Supporting Roles ===
- Zamira Beshimova
- Raxshona Mahmudova – Ubaydullo and Zaynab’s daughter
- Sayfiddin Meliyev
- Guli Rejametova
- Laziz Musayev
- Fidel Asqarxoʻjayev
- Ravshan Norboyev
- Abror Sharipov
- Anvar Musayev
- Anvar Xalilov
- Muzaffar Malikov
- Natalya Narziyeva

== Production ==
Filming took place in the mountainous Boysun District. Due to the harsh and uncomfortable conditions on set, lead actor Nozim Toʻlaxoʻjayev initially refused to participate and returned to Tashkent. However, upon learning a month later that production had completely stalled, he felt a sense of moral obligation and returned to Boysun to resume filming. Toʻlaxoʻjayev later noted that his performance in this film was what truly brought him widespread public recognition.

Another lead actor, Aziz Rametov, prepared for his role by visiting and observing substance abusers alongside the director. Rametov admitted that portraying the character was highly challenging, recalling:

When they buried me in the ground up to my neck, I truly felt the sensation of death. It was terrifying. I was so frightened that I even woke up with cold sores on my lips the next day.

== See also ==
- Oʻtov film
