= Heaven – My Abode =

Heaven – my abode
- Parizod
- Directed by: Ayub Shahobiddinov
- Written by: Erkin A'zam
- Produced by: Agzam Iskhakov
- Starring: Zarina Nizomiddinova
- Cinematography: Azizbek Arzikulov
- Music by: Ubaydullo Karimov
- Production company: Uzbekfilm
- Release date: 2012
- Running time: 81 mins
- Country: Uzbekistan
- Language: Uzbek

Heaven – my abode (Uzbek: Parizod) is a film by Ayub Shahobiddinov. It is awarded as "the best director" film by New York Eurasian Film Festival in 2013. The film is produced by the order of the Uzbekkino National Agency (now: Agency of Developing the National Cinematography) in the film studio of Uzbekfilm. The film received the Grand Prix of "Golden Vine" at Kinoshock Film Festival in Russia.

== Plot ==
In the film, a kind man named Jonibek meets a lonely girl in the mountains, who looks like an angel, a fairy, and has a legendary beauty. They want to marry the girl to acquaintances. But the potential claimant grooms reject the girl one by one, believing that something powerful is hidden behind her beauty, purity and simplicity. There is no man who thinks that he deserves the girl. According to the filmmakers, it suggests that there may be some supernatural beings among us today, and that they should be valued while they are alive.

== Awards and screens ==
"Heaven – my abode" had screens in many countries all over the world; it's presented as a special screen to Shanghai International Film Festival. It was presented in many Universities of the United States, United Kingdom, Korea and Uzbekistan like University of Cambridge, George Washington University. Moreover, it was screened specially in the framework of the "days of literature and film" in Paris. At the UN representative office in Tashkent, the film was presented too.

Awards
	Title of the Festival	Nominations	Country
1	"Kinoshock" International Film Festival	Gran-prix	Russia
2	New York Eurasian Film Festival	The best director	United States
3	"Volokolamsk frontier" International Festival	The best female actor	Russia
4	Nika Award	"The best film of CIS and Baltic states"	Russia
5	"Eng ulug', eng aziz" competition	1st place (Dramaturgy)	Uzbekistan
