= Ayub Shahobiddinov =

Film director

- Ayub Shahobddinov
- Born: May 26, 1977 (age 49)
- Citizenship: Uzbekistan
- Education: Uzbekistan State Institute of Arts and Culture, Institute of Cinematography in Russia
- Occupation: Film director
- Years active: 2003–present
- Known for: Heaven - my abode (2012), Colorless dreams (2020)
- Honours: Honored artist of Uzbekistan

Ayub Shahobiddinov (born 26 May 1977) is an Uzbek film director, screenwriter and an honored artist of Uzbekistan. He is awarded with special medal of “Doʻstlik”.

== Education ==
Shahobiddinov was born on 26 May 1977 in Tashkent.

He graduated from the Uzbekistan State Institute of Arts and Culture in 1999. After graduation he worked as a director for the National TV and Radio company. After some time, he applied for the Institute of Cinematography in Russia, so he studies there for two years and attends the masterclasses of S. Sovolyov and V. Rubinchik. Finishing the course, he returns home and starts his career at the leading film studios of Uzbekistan, Uzbekfilm.

== Career ==
His debut film Qor qo'ynida lola (Tulip in the snow, 2003) receives Gran-prix at "Ijodiy Parvoz" International festival in Tashkent. In 2004, the film was presented to the Cannes Film Festival out of the competition. Moreover, his first film made with the 35 mm film stock "Ko'rgilik" (2005) was also presented at "Ijodiy parvoz" festival and "Start" youth festival in Baku, Azerbaijan, eventually.

Starting from 2007, Shahobiddinov's films were presented to many more International screens. O'tov (The Yurt, 2007) was awarded "The best male actor" at Kinoshock festival (Russia), received the Grand Prix at Cinemarina International Festival (Turkey) and Grand Prix at the National Film Festival of Tashkent (Uzbekistan). O'tov later received a special prize from the jury of the Didor International Film Festival in Dushanbe (Tajikistan) and the diploma "For the contribution of Turkic cinematography" at Golden Minbar International Film Festival.

Parizod (Heaven - my abode, 2012) of Ayub Shahobiddinov was also one of the successful films of his repertoire. "Parizod" awarded "The best director" at New York Eurasian Film Festival (United States), "The best female actor" at "Volokolams frontier" named after S. Bondarchuk (Russia), Grand Prix at Kinoshock (Russia). Parizod was presented in a special screening at the Shanghai International Film Festival.

Colorless dreams (2020) psychological drama was awarded best screenplay at Cinemaking International Film Festival (Bangladesh). It received triple nominations in the national Film Award of Oltin humo: the best director, the best screenplay, the best composer (Uzbekistan).

Shahobiddinov is famous among youth with his commercial films like Sevinch (2004), Telba (Insane, 2008), Belated life (2010), Turist (Tourist, 2013) and sitcom Artist (2016).

== Filmography ==
Film	Year	Awards
Tulip in the snow	2003	Gran-prix (Ijodiy Parvoz International Festival, Uzbekistan)
Sevinch	2004	
Ko'rgilik	2005	
The yurt	2007	The best male actor (Kinoshock International Festival, Russia)
The yurt	2007	Gran-prix (Cinemarina International Film Festival, Turkey)
The yurt	2007	Gran-prix (Toshkent National Film Festival, Uzbekistan)
The yurt	2007	Special prize of jury (Didor International Film Festival, Tajikistan)
The yurt	2007	Diploma "For the contributions to the cinematography of the Turkic world" ("Oltin minbar" International Muslim Film Festival)
Insane	2008	
Belated life	2010	Special award of "Bronzoviy vityaz" ("Zolotoy vityaz" film festival, Russia)
Belated life	2010	The best male actor, ("Zolotoy vityaz" film festival, Russia)
Heaven - my abode	2012	The best director, (New York Eurasian Film Festival, United States)
Heaven - my abode	2012	The best female actor, (Volokolamsk Frontier, Russia)
Heaven - my abode	2012	Gran-prix, (Kinoshock International Film Festival, Russia)
Tourist	2013	
Artist sitcom	2016	
Colorless dreams	2020	The best screenplay (Cinemaking, Bangladesh)
Colorless dreams	2020	The best director (Oltin humo, Uzbekistan)
Colorless dreams	2020	The best screenplay (Oltin humo, Uzbekistan)
Colorless dreams	2020	The best composer (Oltin humo, Uzbekistan)
In Pursuit of Spring	2025	The Best Actress (SCO Film Festival, China)
In Pursuit of Spring	2025	The Best Film The Best Screenplay The Best Male Actor The Best Supporting Male Actor (Antares International Film Festival, Russia)
