= Abdulla Oripov =

Abdulla Oripov (Uzbek: Абдулла Орипов) may refer to:

- Abdulla Oripov (poet) (1941–2016), Uzbek poet
  - Abdulla Oripov (film), a 2023 Uzbek biography of the poet
- Abdulla Oripov (politician) (born 1961), Uzbek Prime Minister
