= Nomsiztepa =

Uzbekistani ruin

Nomsiztepa is an archaeological site in Uzbekistan. It is in the Boysun District of the Surxondaryo Region. It was created during the first-fourth or tenth-thirteenth centuries.

By decision of the cabinet of the Republic of Uzbekistan in October 2019 it was included in the national list of immovable property objects of tangible cultural heritage and received state protection.
