= Colorless Dreams =

Colorless dreams
- Rangsiz tushlar
- Directed by: Ayub Shahobiddinov
- Written by: Umid Xamdamov
- Starring: Feruza Saidova, Karim Mirxodiyev Shohida Ismoilova
- Cinematography: Azizbek Arzikulov
- Music by: Ubaydullo Karimov
- Production company: Uzbekkino
- Release date: 2020
- Running time: 80 mins
- Country: Uzbekistan
- Language: Uzbek
- Budget: $210 000

Colorless dreams — (Uzbek: Rangsiz tushlar) is a psychological drama directed by Ayub Shahobiddinov in 2020.

== Plot ==
The film features several important aspects of changing the human's nature: behind the prison walls, in society and in the family. After seventeen years of imprisonment, Kashmira returns to her Homeland. In her house, everything is quiet and calm and will always be so - Kashmira wants nothing to change in the house that she so eagerly sought, but after returning, events begin that she did not expect and was not ready.

== Cast ==
- Feruza Saidova — Kashmira
- Karim Mirxodiyev — Kashmira's father
- Shohida Ismoilova — Kashmira's mother

== Release ==
This film was premiered at Lucania Film Festival in Italy on August 8, 2020. Later it was presented at several international festivals, including Kazan International Muslim Festival (Russia); Kinoshock Film Festival (Anapa, Russia; Jogja-NETPAC Asian Film Festival (Indonesia); and Asiatica Film Festival (Italy).

== Awards ==
"Colorless dreams" was awarded Best Screenplay at Cinemaking International Film Festival in Dhaka, Bangladesh.

Year	Festival	Nomination	Status	Country
2020	Cinemaking International Film Festival	The best screenplay	Won	Bangladesh
2021	Oltin humo	The best director	Won	Uzbekistan
2021	Oltin humo	The best screenplay	Won	Uzbekistan
2021	Oltin humo	The best composer	Won	Uzbekistan
