= Finnick =

- Finnick (film)
- Finnick Odair, character in The Hunger Games
- Finnick (Zootopia), character in Zootopia
