= Furkat Usmanov =

Uzbek screenwriter and film director

Director of the Center for the Development of National Cinematography of Uzbekistan
- In office June 2023 – present

Personal details
- Born: October 13, 1991 (age 34) Samarkand, Uzbekistan
- Education: Gerasimov Institute of Cinematography
- Profession: director, screenwriter, producer

Furkat Usmanov (Uzbek: Furqat Dilshodovich Usmanov; was born October 13, 1991, in Samarkand, Uzbekistan) is an Uzbek film director, screenwriter, producer, documentary filmmaker. He holds the position of director of the Center for the Development of National Cinematography of Uzbekistan. and executive director of the Tashkent International Film Festival.

== Career ==
At 13 Usmanov got into writing poems and monologues. At 14 he made his first sketch and scenario for short movies in the documentary genre. Then he started to write lyrics for the music of local singers. The first documentary film in which Usmanov participated, "Amir Temur's life companions", was released in 2017. In 2019, with assistance of blogger Nurbek Alimov, he translated the project "Home" by Yann Arthus-Bertrand and Luc Besson into Uzbek, becoming the official Uzbek voiceover of the project.

In January 2022, Usmanov was appointed director of the Studio of Documentary and Chronicle Films' under the Cinematography Agency of Uzbekistan. As part of the decrees and decisions of Shavkat Mirziyoyev, he produced a number of propaganda films on historical and social themes, shown on federal Uzbek TV channels, including the film about Paralympians 'Matonat Maktabi' ('School of Perseverance'), 'Inson' ('Human'), a series of films "Xalq yuragi" ("Soul of the People"), a joint documentary with Russian journalist Pavel Selin "On the New Silk Road". During this time, Usmanov was fighting cancer. He was included in the list of Uzbeks who 'made their compatriots proud' in 2022. Usmanov himself states that he makes fiction and documentary films. He speaks about freedom of speech, the policy of openness, and charity. Film writer Shoim Butaev calls Usmanov's work "art therapy" and "a reflection of the judgement of young people entering the arts".

In June 2023, Furkat Usmanov became the head of the Center for the Development of National Cinematography of Uzbekistan and the executive director of the Tashkent International Film Festival In May 2024. He is a member of the jury of the TURKSOY Korkut-Ata Film Festival. He headed the Uzbek pavilion at the 77th Cannes Film Festival. In 2025, he joined the jury of the SCO film festival "Golden Camellia".

== Main projects ==
"Xalq yuragi" ("Soul of the People")

In 2020, at the opening ceremony of the Writers' Alley in Tashkent, Shavkat Mirziyoyev commissioned the preparation of a cycle of 24 documentaries about Uzbek poets and writers. Furkat Usmanov became one of the scriptwriters for the project, writing the screenplay for "Xalq yuragi" ("Heart of the People"), the prefaces to the series, and the documentaries dedicated to Alisher Navoi and Abdulla Oripov. In a review of the films about Alisher Navoi and Oripov by Shohrukh Abdurasulov, it is stated that if the author's aim was to introduce people, especially young people, to national history and culture, then it has been achieved. The presentation and premiere of the film took place in the Writers' Alley in 2021. Subsequently, the films of the series were broadcast on federal channels in honor of the Independence Day of the Republic and the holiday of Nowruz.

"Inson" ("Human")

On 21 March 2022, in honor of the Nowruz holiday, the premiere of Furkat Usmanov's documentary series "Inson" ("Human"), dedicated to ordinary people, took place simultaneously on five Uzbek federal television channels. Usmanov acted as director, screenwriter, and producer. The series consists of two parts, each with five episodes. Ordinary Uzbeks - bloggers on social issues, paramedics, people affected by COVID-19, doctors, soldiers, women, and children evacuated from Syria during Operation "Mehr" - were chosen as subjects. Art and film critic Shohrukh Abdurasuov believes that the value of such films lies in the topicality of the issues, which are becoming painful problems for modern Uzbek society and global problems that are waiting to be solved. Art critic Ikbol Kushshaeva writes that despite the propagandistic idea and state order in his film, Usmanov prioritizes the person over the idea, which she believes demonstrates the director's ability to set boundaries and "reach social reality through the heart of the character".

"Abdulla Oripov"

In 2022, filming began in the USA on a feature film about the political figure, poet, and author of the Uzbek national anthem, Abdulla Oripov. Furkat Usmanov was involved in writing the script, which he had prepared two years earlier. The premiere of the film was timed to coincide with Uzbekistan's Independence Day and was screened at the Tashkent Cinema Palace – "Panorama" on 1 September 2023. In a review of the film, art critic Ikbol Kushshaeva gave the film a generally positive assessment, but noted that the phenomenon of the poet in the film does not extend beyond Uzbekistan: "Uzbek cinema still does not want to free itself from post-colonial thinking".

"Shining Stars: Jami and Navoi"

In 2021, the presidents of Uzbekistan and Tajikistan initiated the creation of a joint film about Alisher Navoi and Jami. In 2022, the Cinematography Agency of Uzbekistan and Tajikfilm approved the concept of the film. On the Uzbek side, Furkat Usmanov became the director and co-screenwriter. In April 2022, Luc Besson expressed his desire to participate in the making of the film. According to Usmanov, Besson stated that he wanted to work with young directors from Uzbekistan and Tajikistan and would act as a consultant for the project. The project was presented in September 2022 at the signing ceremony of a memorandum of cooperation between the Cinematography Agency of Uzbekistan and Tajikfilm during the Tashkent International Film Festival. Luc Besson presented the project together with Armand Assante. Besson said he was pleased to be involved in the project, which tells the story of "poets who stopped the war", and was happy to work with young directors, including Usmanov. In September 2024, video auditions for actors began in Dushanbe.

== Filmography ==
Director

- "The Global TIIAME"
- "Samarkand during the period of Romanov`s Dynasty"
- "Alisher Navoi"
- "Abdulla Oripov"
- "Inson" ("Human")
- "Mustahkam"
- "Home of Justice"
- "Shining Stars: Jami and Navoi"

Screenwriter

- "The wives of Amir Timur"
- "Samarkand during the period of Romanov`s Dynasty"
- "The Global TIIAME"
- "The Soul of people"
- "Alisher Navai"
- "Abdulla Aripov"
- "Wedding in one day"
- "Inson" ("Human")
- "Mustahkam"
- "Home of Justice"
- "Cancer of Conscience"
- "The art of cooperation"
- "Abdulla Aripov"
- "Shining Stars: Jami and Navoi"

Producer

- "Inson" ("Human")
- "Cancer of Conscience"
- "The art of cooperation"
- "On the New Silk Road"
- "Umar Kamoliddin Sayiddin Shamsiddin"
- "Abdulla Aripov"
- "Whose are you, old man?"

Dubbing

- "Home" (official Uzbek voiceover of the movie)

== Awards ==
- 2021 —" Uzbekistan Media Award 2021" (for the best media project dedicated to the 30th anniversary of Uzbekistan's independence)
- 2022 —Grand Prix of the Korkut-Ata Film Festival for Best Documentary "(Inson")
- 2022 — State Prize "Greatest, Dearest" (for services in disseminating the literary heritage of the Uzbek people, glorifying the life and work of our great ancestors through films, for his original work in the documentaries "The Soul of the People", "Alisher Navoi", "Cancer of Conscience" and "Inson")
- 2023 — Special diploma from the "Zolotoy Vityaz" International Film Forum ("Inson")
- 2023 – Award for the Best Scenario at the Korkut-Ata Film Festival ("Abdulla Oripov")
- 2023 — People's Choice Award at the "Oltin Humo" National Film Festival ("Abdulla Oripov")
- 2024 — Best Film Award of the XII International Short Film Festival of the CIS, Baltic States, and Georgia ("Whose are you, old man?" film)
- 2024 - Diploma "Best Cinematography Work "Eurasia.doc" ("Whose old man, are you?" film)

State award

- 2021 - Medal "30 years of Independence of Uzbekistan"
