= Belated Life =

2010 film in Uzbekistan

- Kechikkan hayot
- Directed by: Ayub Shahobiddinov
- Written by: Yolkin Tuychiyev
- Starring: Dilnoza Kubayeva, Bobur Yuldashev, Doniyor Hafizov, Karim Mirkhodiyev, Zulkhumor Muminova
- Cinematography: Azizbek Arzikulov
- Edited by: Husan Yusupov
- Music by: Ubaydullo Karimov
- Production company: Uzbekfilm
- Distributed by: Uzbekkino
- Release date: 2010
- Country: Uzbekistan
- Language: Uzbek

Belated Life - (Uzbek: Kechikkan hayot, Russian: Поздняя жизнь) a.k.a. Late life is a psychological drama and melodrama film by Ayub Shahobiddinov, filmed in 2010. The film was presented to many international film festivals; in 2012 this film received two awards "The best male actor" and special award of "Бронзовый витязь" at once at "Золотой витязь" (Golden Knight) film festival held in Omsk, Russia. Apart from this, the film was screened at fifth forum of traditionally organized "Friendship" film festival in India and received positive reviews from critics.

== Storyline ==
One of the heroines of the film, Shahodat lives in a city. She works as an editor at one of the well-known publishing companies. She has no materialistic problems, but has sufficient problems in her personal life. She is 30, but still single. She understands that she should change her life, quits her immediate lifestyle and marries a man named Hamlet, a butcher in the village. Marriage... and conflicts are ahead for them...

== Actors and characters ==
- Dilnoza Kubayeva - Shahodat
- Bobur Yuldashev - Hamlet
- Doniyot Hafizov - Erkin
- Karim Mirkhodiyev - uncle of Erkin
- Zulkhumor Muminova - aunt of Erkin
- Rikhsikhon Ibrokhimova - mother of Hamlet
- Pulat Saidqosimov - chairman of mahalla
- Jamila Gafurova -

== Awards ==
Year	Nomination	Festival	Country
2021	The best male actor	"Zolotoy vityaz"	Russia
2021	Special award of "Bronzoviy vityaz"	"Zolotoy vityaz"	Russia
