= Culture and Arts Capital of the Turkic World =

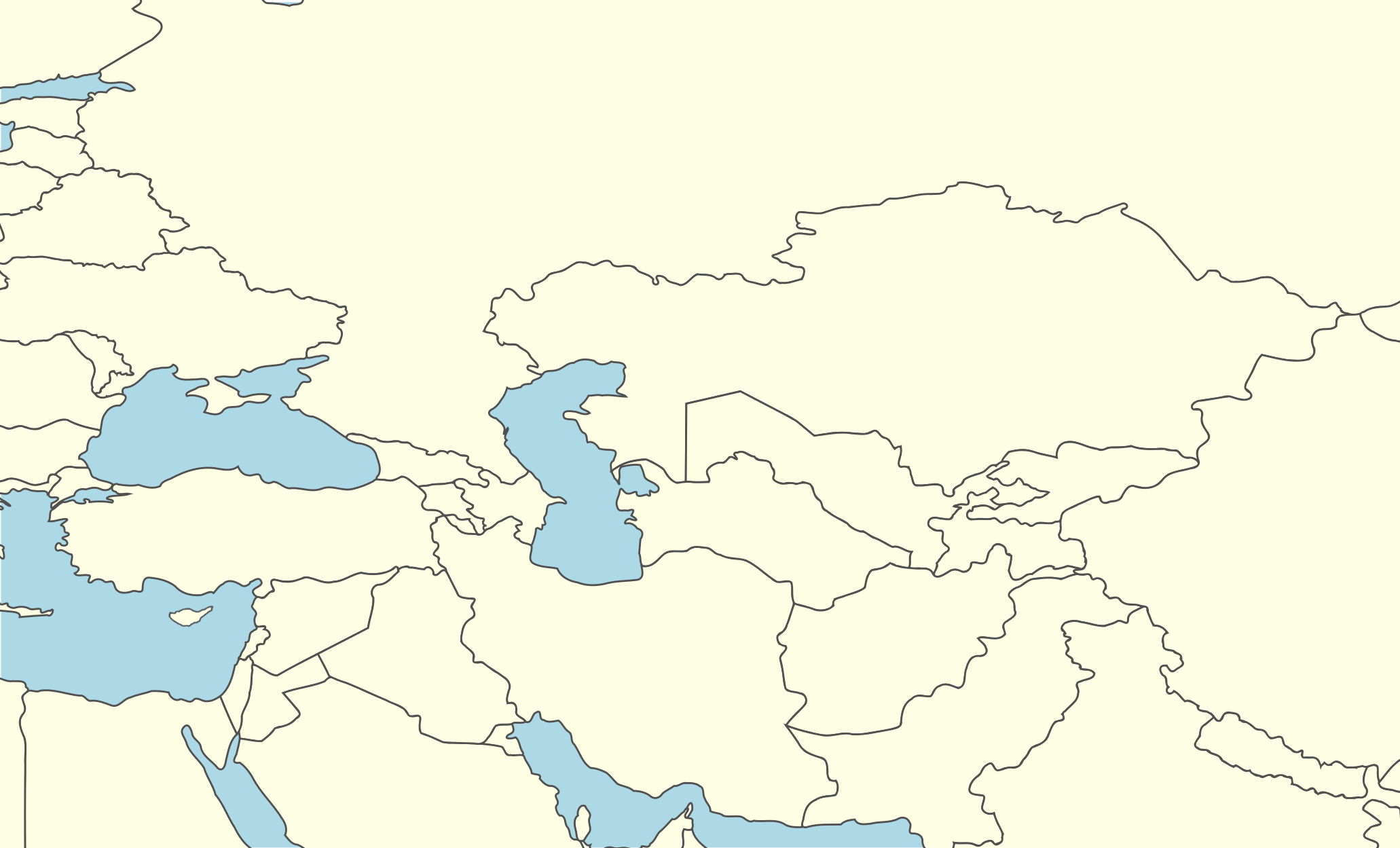
Location of Turkic Capitals of Culture

Culture and Arts Capital of the Turkic World, (Turkish: Türk Dünyası Kültür Başkenti) is a city designated by the TÜRKSOY for a period of one calendar year during which it organises a series of cultural events.

The decision for a cultural capital was made during the tenth meeting of Türksoy in 2010. The first city is selected as Astana for the year 2012. With the 2013 edition, a Eurovision themed song contest, Turkvision Song Contest, debuted.

== List of capital cities ==
Year	City	Country/Region	Notes/Notable activities
2012	Astana	Kazakhstan	-
2013	Eskişehir	Turkey	Turkvision Song Contest 2013
2014	Kazan	Tatarstan (Russia)	Turkvision Song Contest 2014
2015	Mary	Turkmenistan	-
2016	Sheki	Azerbaijan	-
2017	Turkistan	Kazakhstan	-
2018	Kastamonu	Turkey	-
2019	Osh	Kyrgyzstan	-
2020	Khiva	Uzbekistan	Also 2021, due to COVID-19 pandemic
2022	Bursa	Turkey	2022 World Nomad Games, 2nd Korkut Ata Film Festival
2023	Shusha	Azerbaijan	3rd Korkut Ata Film Festival
2024	Anau	Turkmenistan	-
2025	Aktau	Kazakhstan	-
2026	Andijan	Uzbekistan	-
2027	Kayseri	Turkey	-

Astana (Kazakhstan), Capital for 2012

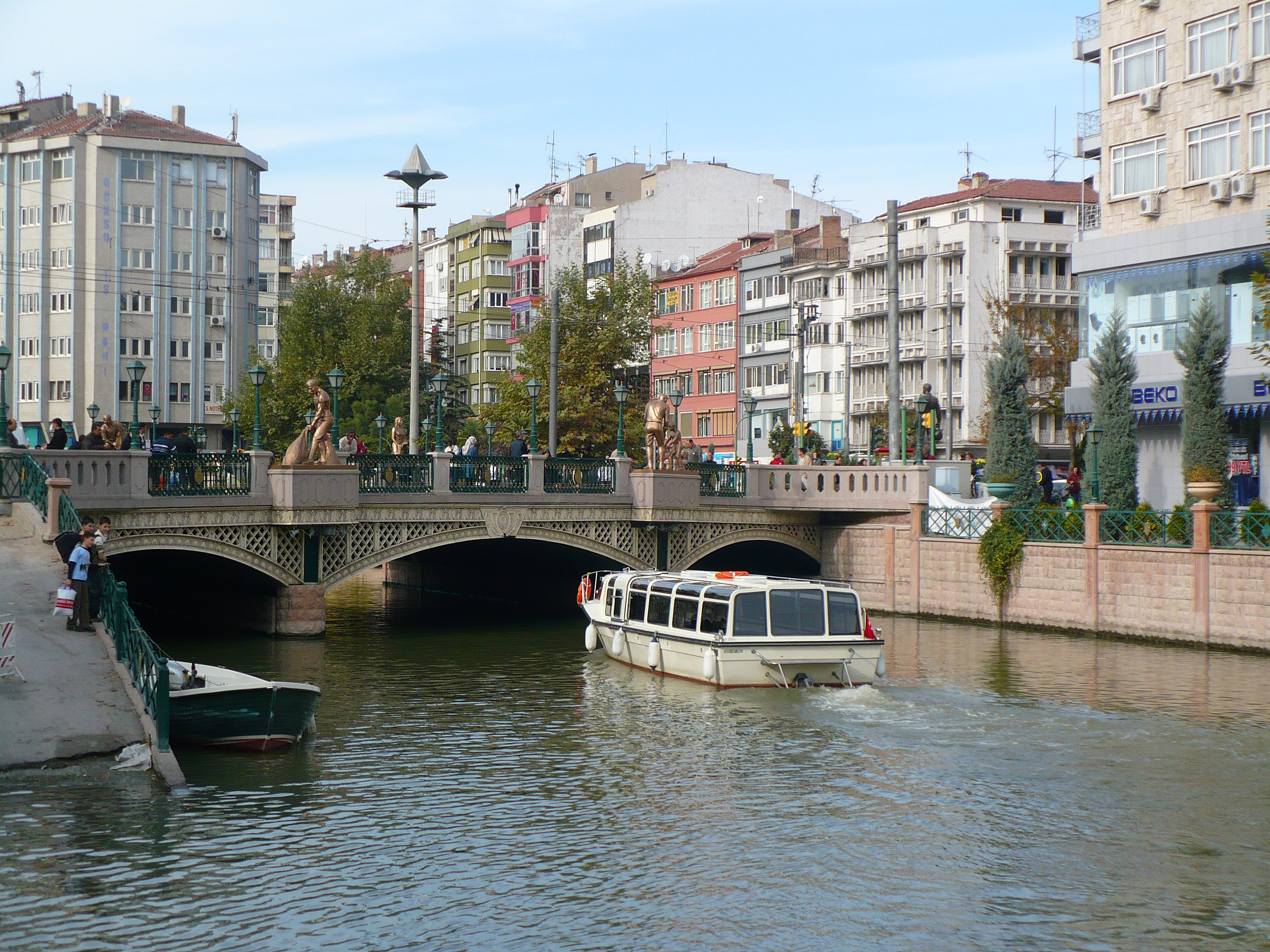
Eskişehir (Turkey), Capital for 2013

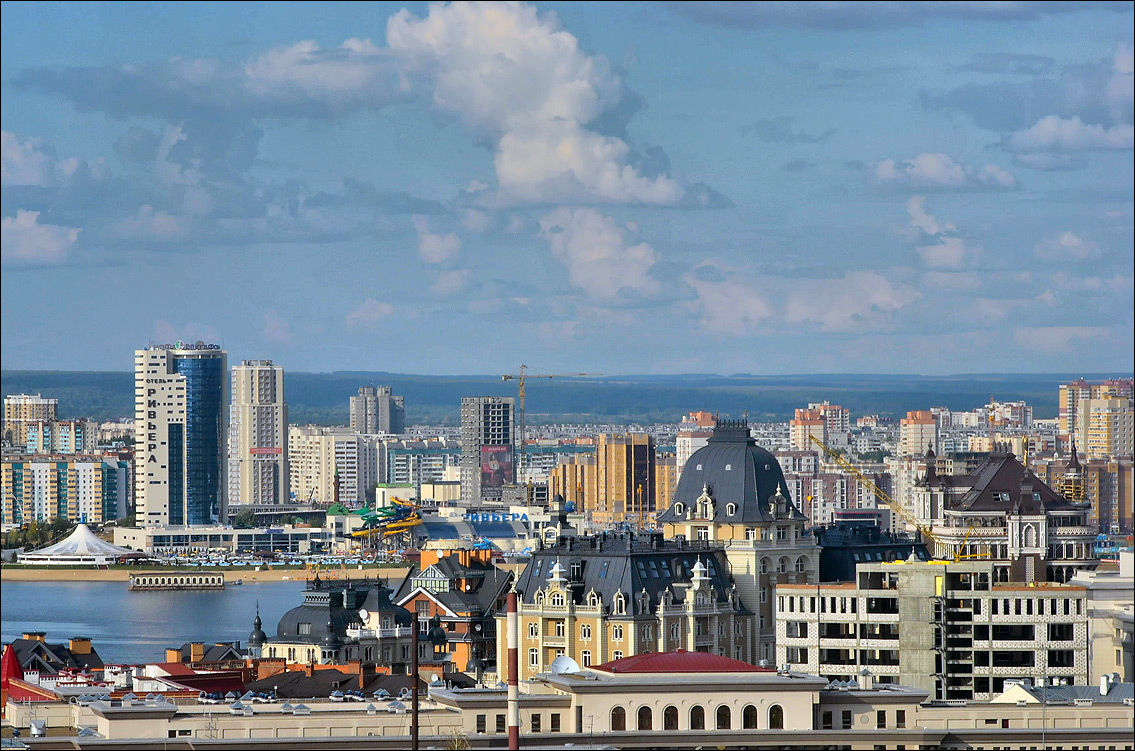
Kazan (Russia), Capital for 2014

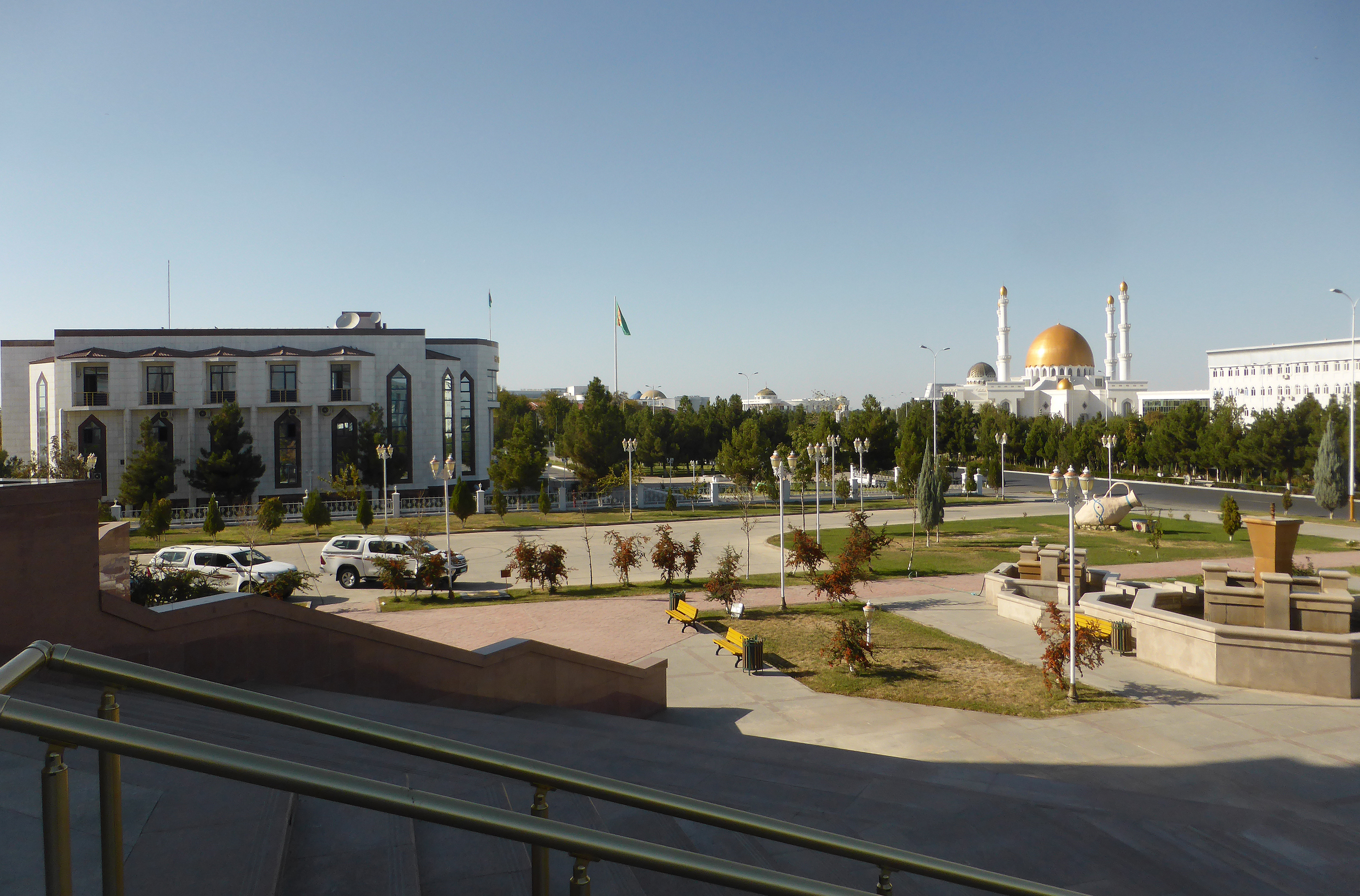
Mary (Turkmenistan), Capital for 2015

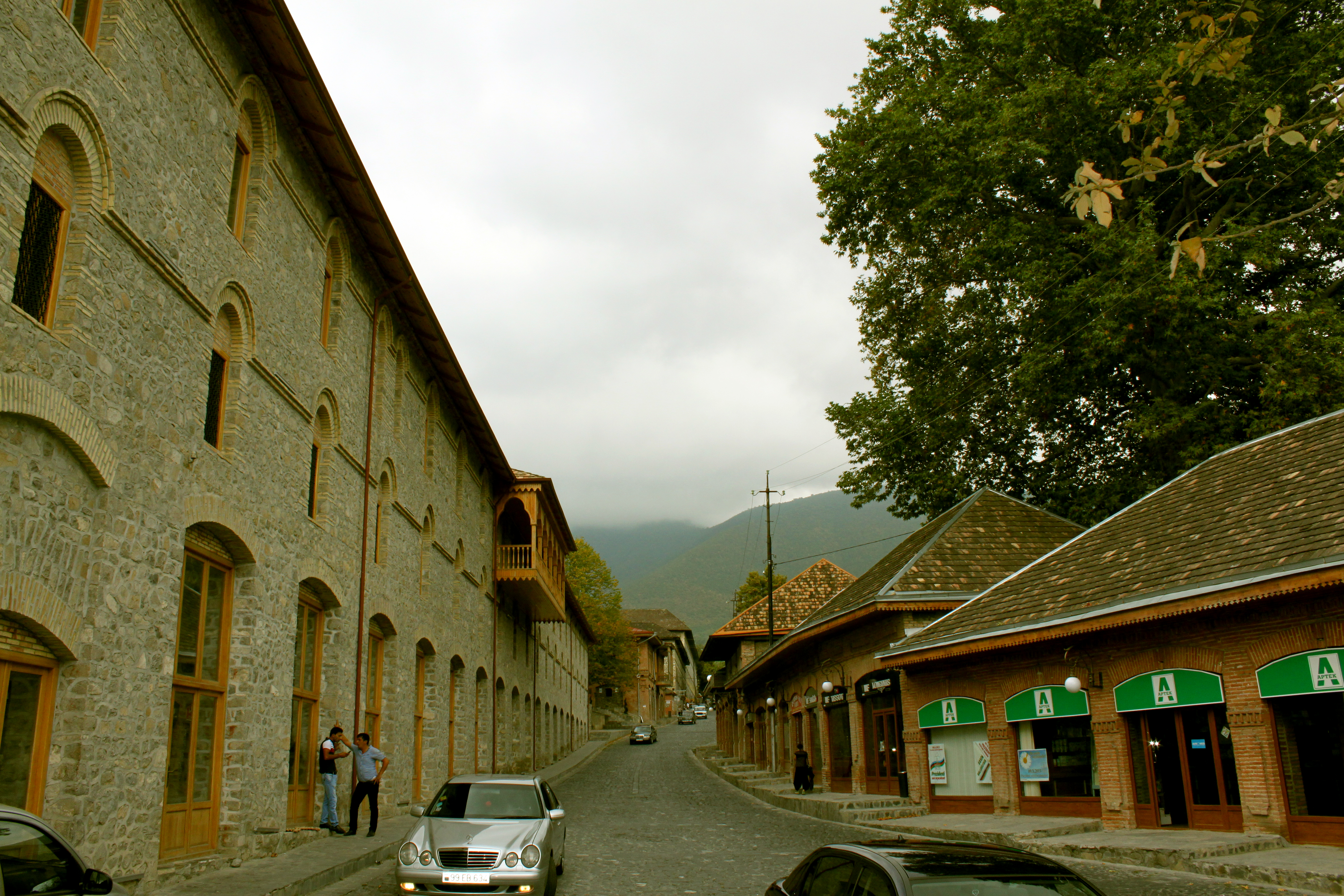
Sheki (Azerbaijan), Capital for 2016

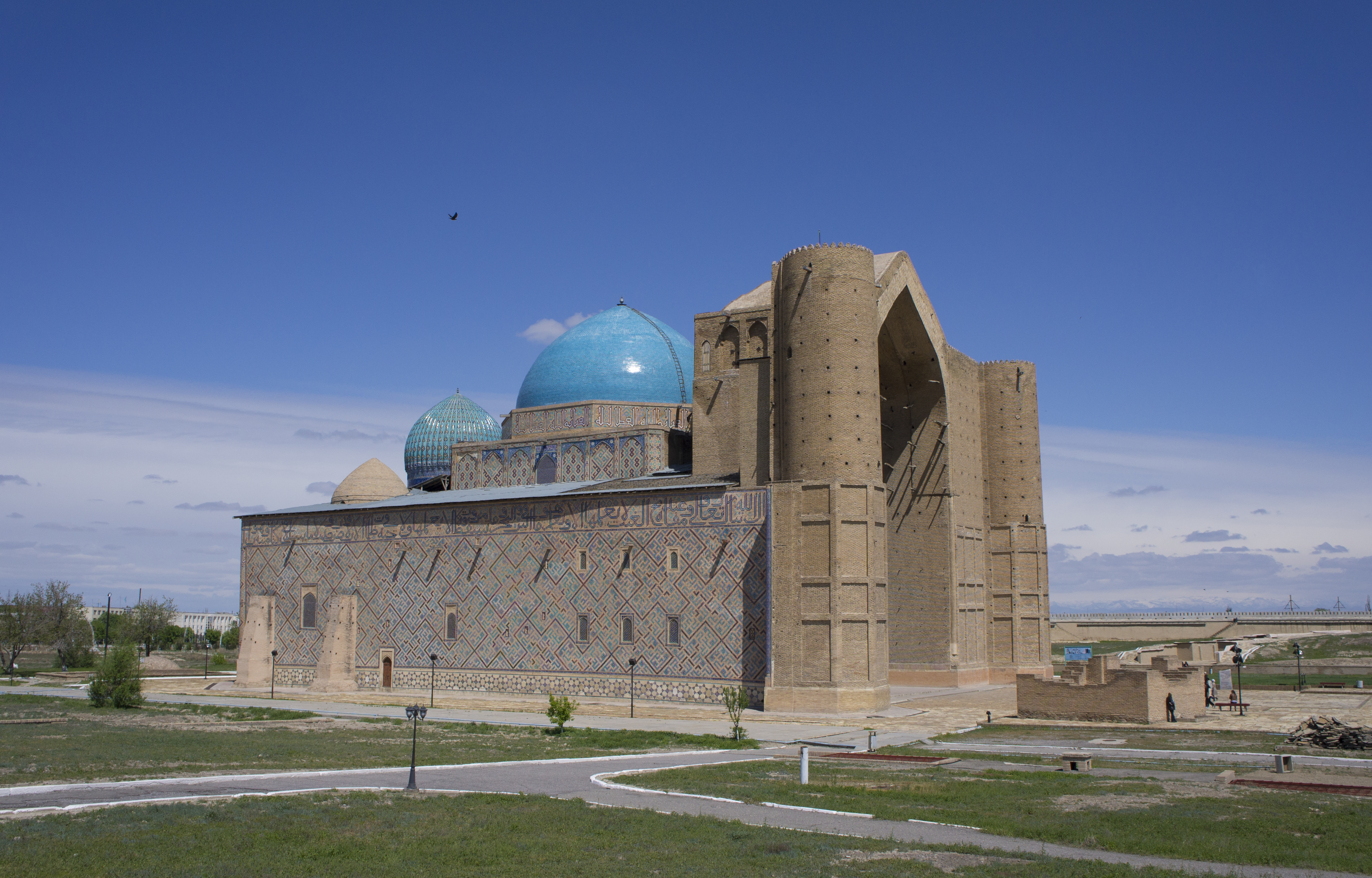
Turkistan (Kazakhstan), Capital for 2017

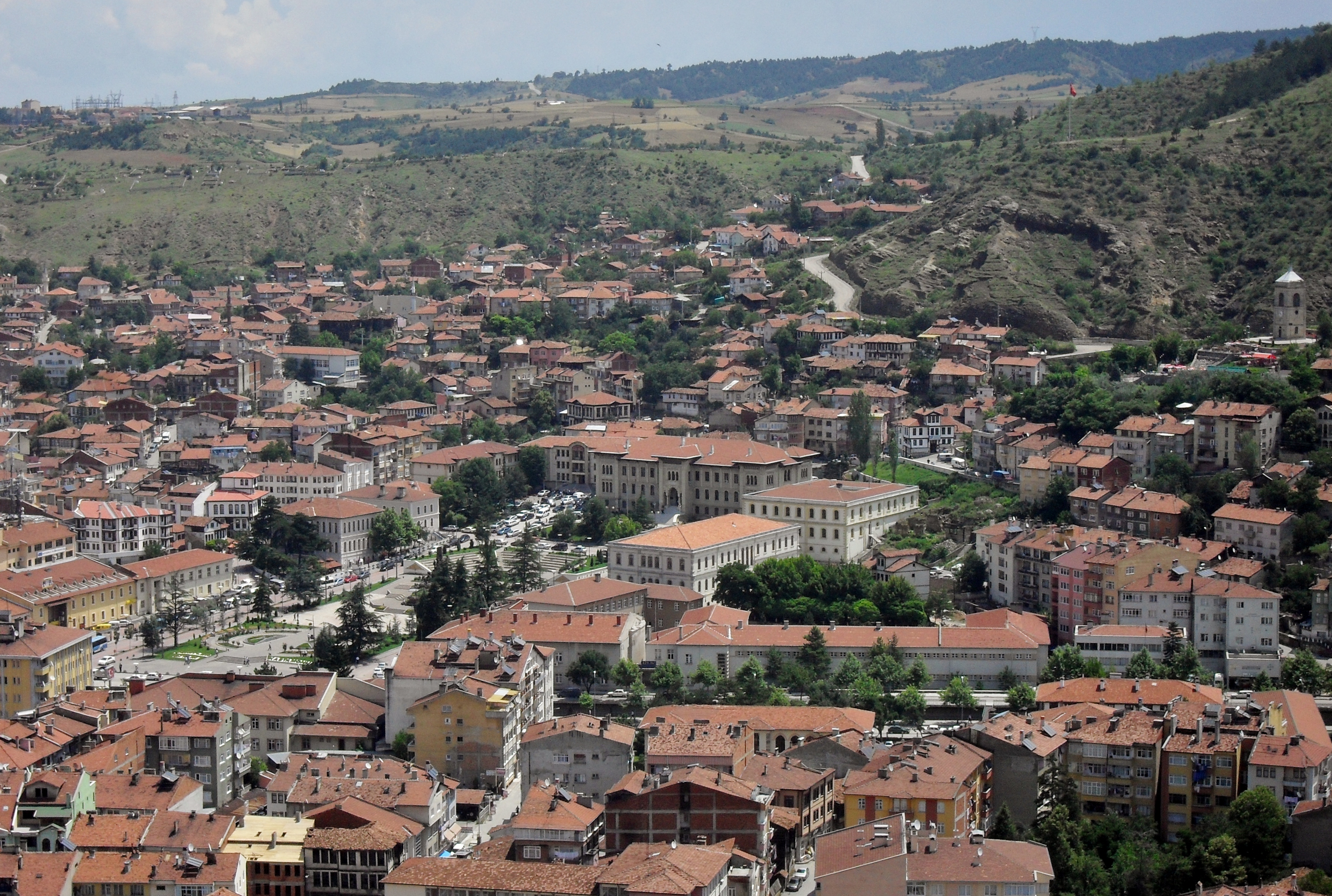
Kastamonu (Turkey), Capital for 2018

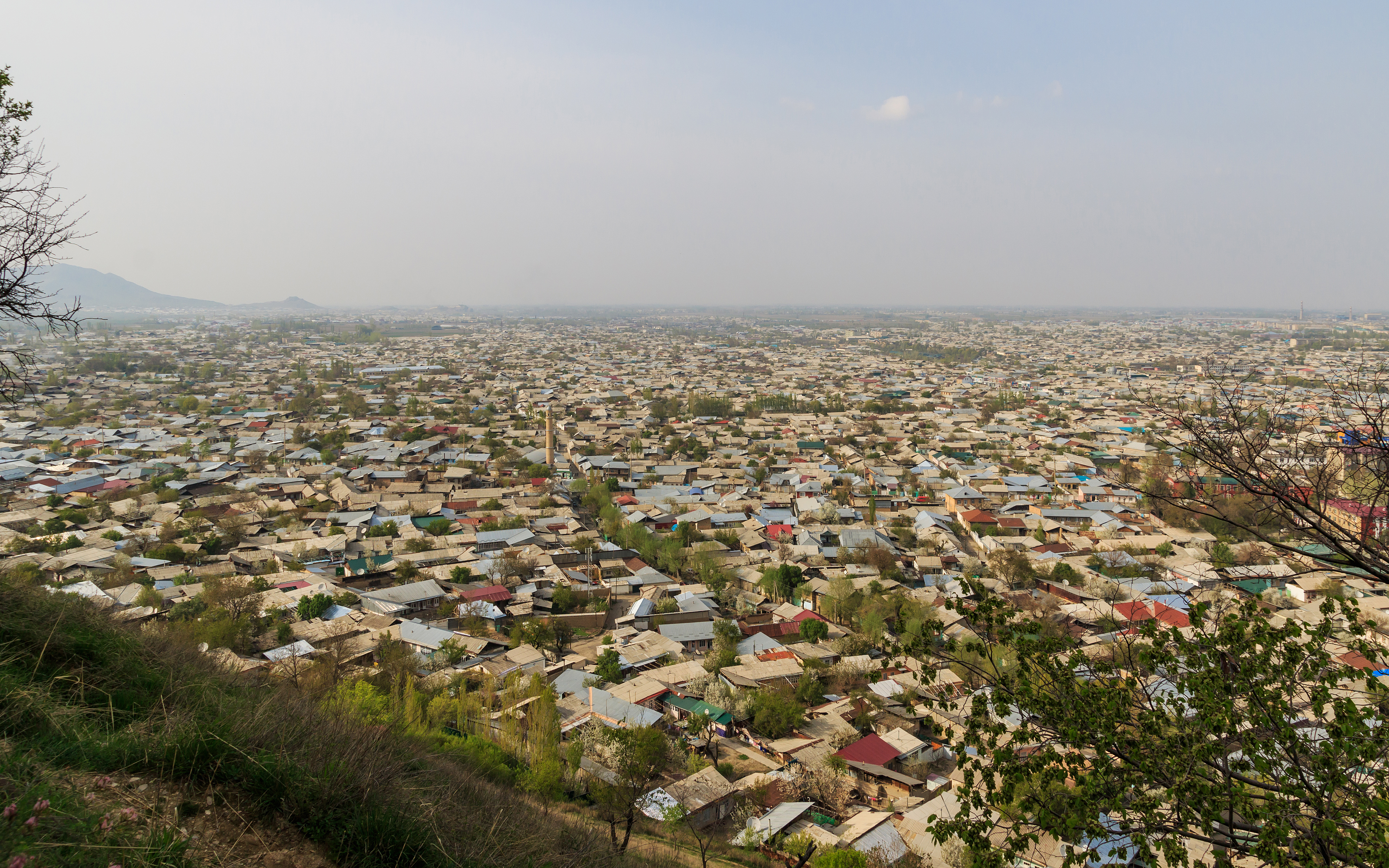
Osh (Kyrgyzstan), Capital for 2019

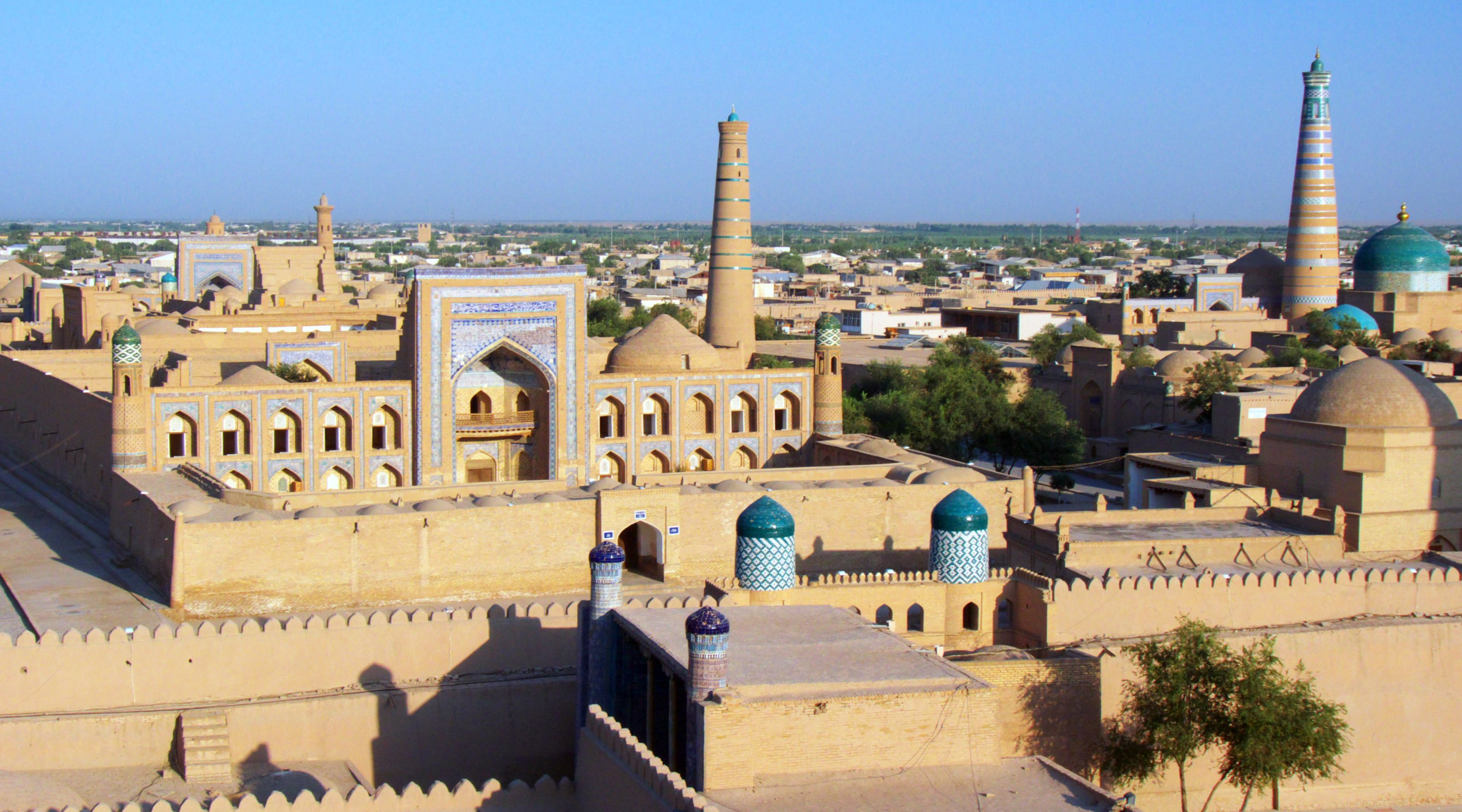
Khiva (Uzbekistan), Capital for 2020-21

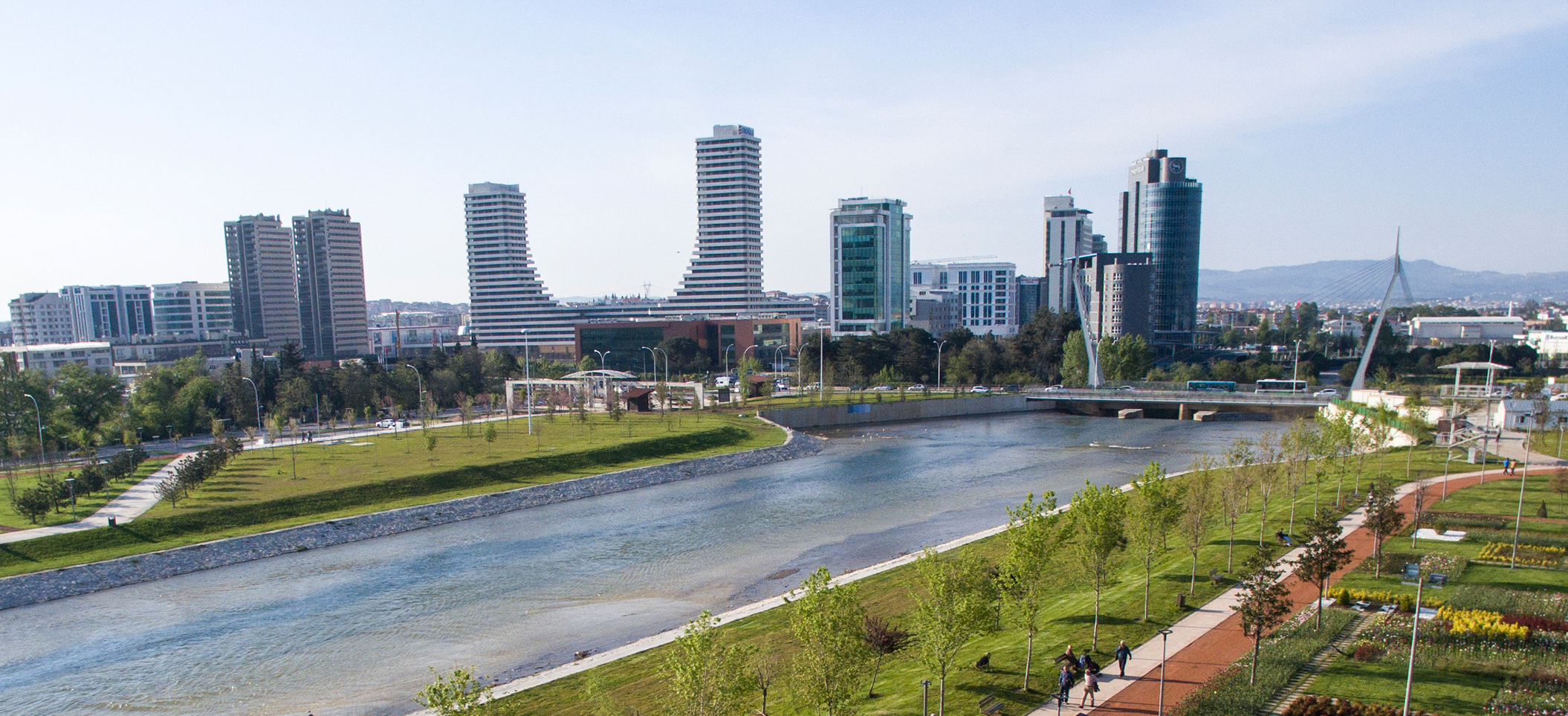
Bursa (Turkey), Capital for 2022

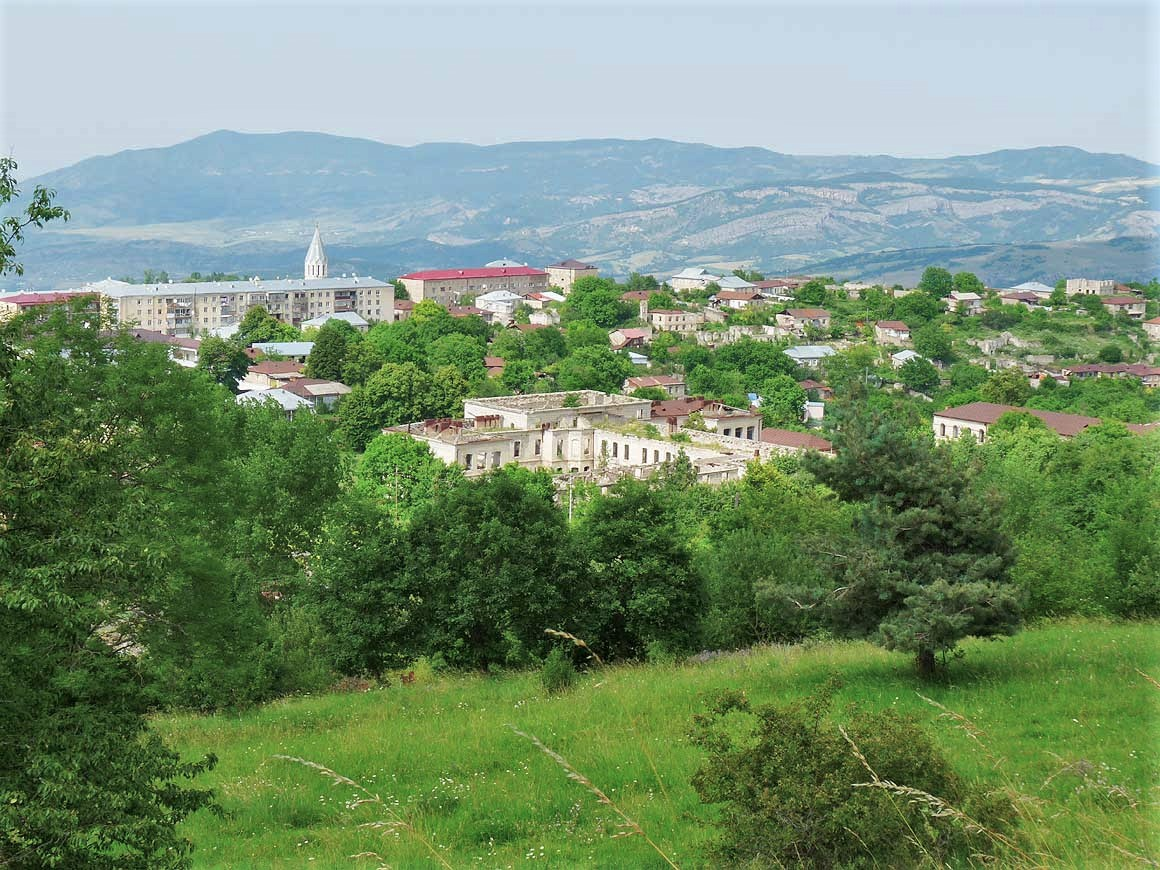
Shusha (Azerbaijan), capital for 2023

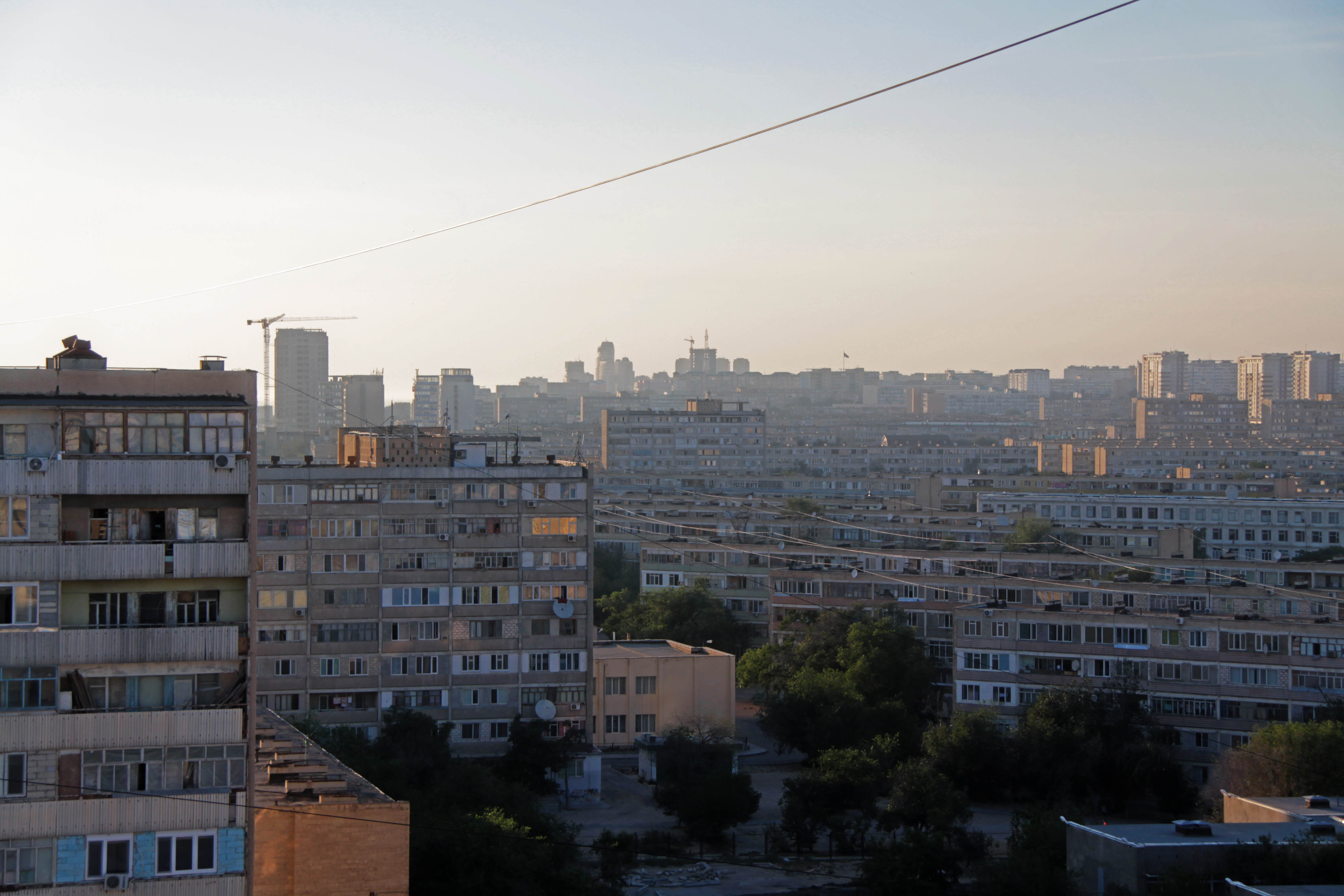
Aktau (Kazakhstan), capital for 2025

== See also ==
- European Capital of Culture
