= Abdulla Oripov (film) =

- Abdulla Oripov
- Directed by: Muzaffarhon Erkinov
- Written by: Abdukayum Yuldoshev; Furkat Usmanov; Mukaddas Usmonova
- Produced by: Firdavs Abdukhalikov
- Starring: Jasurbek Abdumannopov; Shodmon Salomov; Kudratillo Burkhonov
- Music by: Muinzoda
- Distributed by: Film Studio of Documentary and Newsreel Films
- Release date: 2023
- Running time: 110 minutes
- Country: Uzbekistan
- Language: Uzbek

Abdulla Oripov (uz. Abdulla Oripov) is a biographical drama directed by Uzbek filmmaker Muzaffar Erkinov. The film chronicles the life of Abdulla Oripov, People's Poet of the Uzbek SSR, author of the lyrics of the national anthem of Uzbekistan, and political figure.

== Filming and premiere ==
In 2022, president of Uzbekistan Shavkat Mirziyoyev visited Oripov's homeland in the Kashkadarya region and commissioned the production of a feature film dedicated to the poet. Filming took place in Uzbekistan, as well as in Houston and Los Angeles. Filming was completed in February 2023.

The premiere of the film was timed to coincide with Uzbekistan's Independence Day and took place at the Tashkent Cinema House on September 1, 2023. In October of the same year, the film was shown in Shusha at the Korkut Ata Film Festival-2023. The film received the prize for the best script.

In December of the same year, the film won the Audience Award at the Oltin Humo National Film Festival. In February 2024, the film was included in the program of the 42nd Fajr Film Festival in Iran.

== Plot ==
The film tells about Abdulla Aripov's childhood, student period, first creative achievements, the process of becoming a poet and the emotions he experienced during this process. In addition, the film shows the poet's love, his path to fame, his steadfastness in confronting the Soviet system, despite adversity and difficulties, as well as the last years of his life in the United States.

== Criticism ==
In her review of the film, art critic Ikbol Kushshaeva generally gives a positive assessment of the film, but notes that the poet's phenomenon in the film does not extend beyond the borders of Uzbekistan: "Uzbek cinema still does not want to free itself from postcolonial thinking."

Reviewer and screenwriter Shohida Eshonboboeva writes that it was difficult for the director to create an artistic portrait of Oripov on screen. "Even now, one gets the impression that the experienced director was constantly given instructions during filming, because the film resembles a documentary."

As film critic Shokhrukh Abdurasulov notes, the main message of the film is the poet's courage and determination within the totalitarian system: "In particular, in the 1960s, political pressure on the poet increased, he was accused of slandering socialist society (for poems like "Dorboz"). When the poem "She is Tilimga" was published, the fire flared up even more. These events shock the viewer and evoke the horrors of the totalitarian system."

== Awards ==
- 2023 — Best Script Award at the Korkut-Ata Film Festival.
- 2023 — Audience Award at the Oltin Khumo National Film Festival

== Cast ==
- Abdulla Aripov:
  - In childhood — Jasurbek Abdumannopov
  - In adulthood — Shodmon Salomov
  - In old age — Kudratillo Burkhonov
- Khanifa Mustafayeva (Aripov's wife):
  - Raikhon Asadova
  - In old age — Gulchekhra Dzhamilova
- Lola Eltoeva — Klara Khadzhaeva
- KGB officer — Abror Yuldoshev

== Film crew ==
- Director — Muzaffar Erkinov
- Script — Abdukayum Yuldoshev, Furkat Usmanov
- Camera operator — Ravshan Mirzakamolov
- Composer — Muinzoda
- Executive producer – Furkat Usmanov
- General producer — Firdavs Abdukhalikov
