= Dilnoza Kubayeva =

Uzbek actress (born 1986)

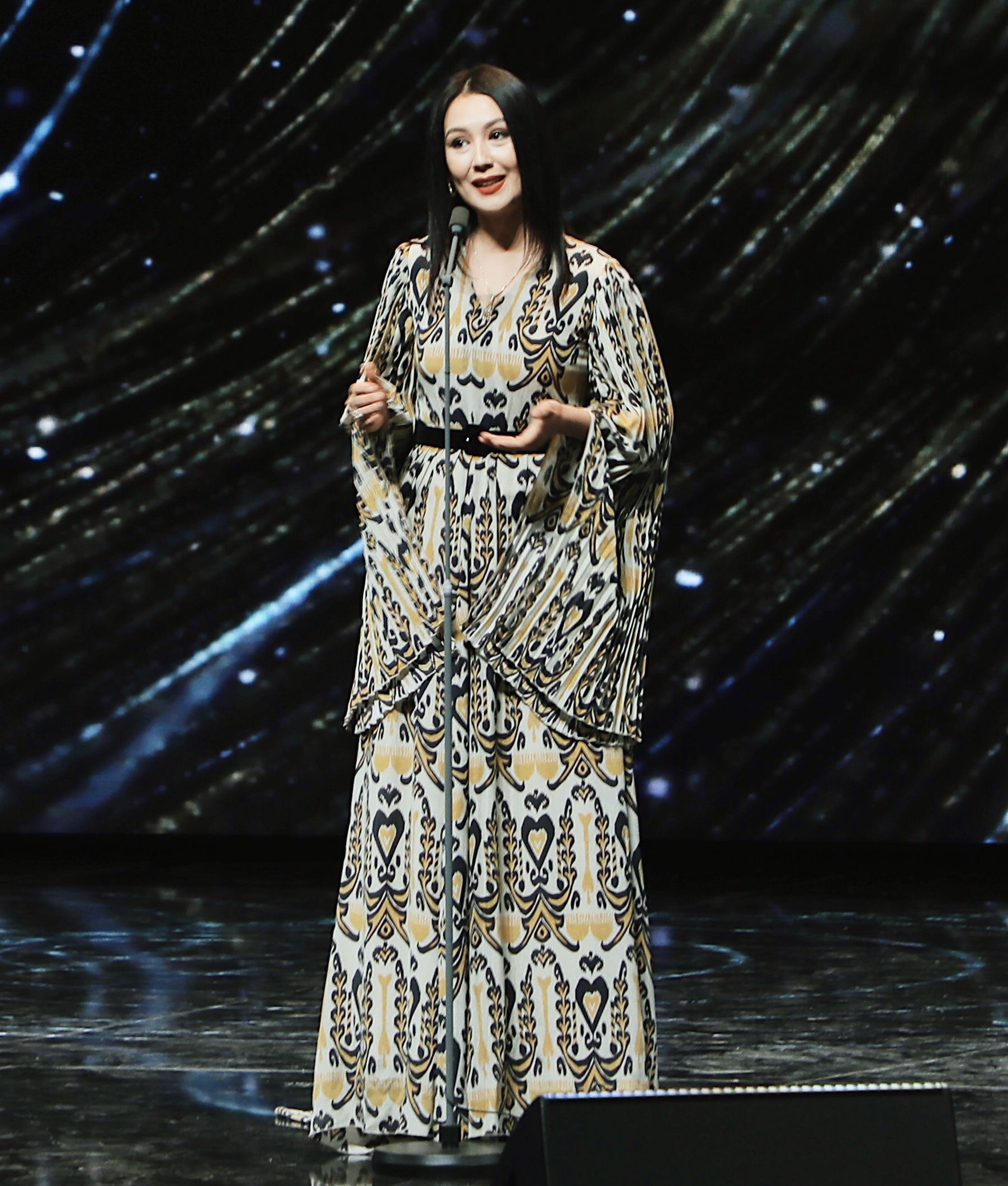
- Born: November 22, 1986 (age 39); Tashkent, Uzbek SSR, USSR
- Education: Tashkent State Institute of Arts (Toshkent davlat san’at instituti)
- Occupations: Actress, singer
- Years active: 2004 - present
- Children: Kubayev Muhammadamin
- Website: dilnozakubayeva.com

Dilnoza Kubayeva (Uzbek: Dilnoza Kubayeva; born November 22, 1986) is an Uzbek theater and film actress. Dilnoza Kubayeva became famous for a number of numerous roles in modern Uzbek films. Kubayeva is best known for her roles in such films as Kelgindi kelin, Telba, Kechikkan hayot, Farzandim, Hijron and Ko'rgim keladi. In 2012, she was awarded the "Shuhrat medali". Since 2007, she has been working at the National Theater of Uzbekistan (Milliy teatr). Kubayeva has played about 30 large and small roles in various theatrical performances. She also takes an active part in public affairs and sincerely approaches every case. In 2010, Kubayeva was awarded the "Oʻzbekiston belgisi".

Honored Artist of Uzbekistan (2023)

== Biography ==
Kubayeva was born on November 22, 1986, in Tashkent in an educated family. She studied at secondary school No.255 of the Yashnabad district in Tashkent from 1993 to 1996, secondary school No.3 of the Sergeli district from 1996 to 2000, and the Republican Lyceum "Fine Arts", named after Alisher Navoi, from 2000 to 2003.

From 2003 to 2007, she studied at the Mannon Uygur Tashkent State Institute of Arts (Department of Drama Theater and Cinema). Upon graduating from this institute, Kubayeva received a bachelor's degree. Since 2007, she has been working as an actress at the Uzbek National Academic Drama Theater. In 2010, Kubayeva was awarded the badge "Oʻzbekiston belgisi", in the same year she took second place in the Republican contest "Eng ulug', eng aziz". Further, in 2012 she was awarded the "Shuhrat medali", and in 2021, she was awarded prizes and commemorative medals in honor of the "30th anniversary of Independence of the Republic of Uzbekistan". Her husband died in 2009. Her son Kubayev Muhammadamin was born on March 28, 2009, in Tashkent. Dilnoza Kubayeva also actively participates in prestigious state events, award ceremonies, cultural and performs at educational evenings and concerts of famous pop singers.

== Acting ==
Her theatrical debut took place in 2004 in the film Andishali kelinchak, and in 2005 in the film Taqdir charxpalagi.

Movies
Year	List of Movies	Roles
2005	Taqdir charxpalagi	Laylo
2005	Kelgindi kuyov	Rayhon
2006	Kelgindi kelin	Charos
2007	Advokatlar	Oydin
2007	Zumrad va Qimmat	Qimmat
2007	Jazo	Zilola
2008	Telba	Robiya
2008	Kichkina odamlar	Zarifa
2008	Afyun girdobi	lieutenant Nazira Shamsiyeva
2010	Hijron	Mahfuza
2010	Oʻgʻrigina keli	Sayyora
2010	Yuzma-yuz	Feruza
2010	Belated life	Shahodat
2011	Er bermoq — jon bermoq	Durdona
2011	Kelganda kelin yohud anjancha muhabbat	Go’yo Maqsadovna
2011	Farzandim)	Nasiba
2012	Baxt uyi	Malika
2013	Farzandim 2	Nasiba
2013	Sensiz	Malika
2014	Koʻrgim keladi	Ziyoda Aliyeva
2016	Baron	Kelin
2016	Er bermoq — jon bermoq 2	Laylo
2016	Baron 2	Kelin
2016	Isnod	Jamila
2018	Vasiyat	Fotima
2018	Merosxo'r	Mother
2019	Said bilan Saida	Major Woman
2019	Yolg'iz bo'ri	Zamira
2020	O'zbekcha ajrashish	Mahalla raisi

TV serials
Year	TV series title	Roles
2005	Qadah	Mohinur
2008	Kaminaning oilasi	Bahora
2008	Muhabbatim-qismatim	Malika
2010	Mehribonginam	Tabassumxon
2018	Omonat	Mastura
2020	Sevgi	Jamila

Roles in the Theater
Year	List of performances	Roles
2005	Andishali kelinchak	Kelin - Olmaxon
2006	Omonat dunyo	Zulayho
2007	Birqanotlilar	Nilufar
2008	Bevalar	Dildora
2010	Sizsiz oʻtmas kunlarim	Iroda
2010	Rustam	Qumri
2010	Ogoh boʻling, odamlar	Mavjuda
2011	Omon boʻlgin azizim	Mehmon ayol
2015	Oʻtkan kunlar	Kumushbibi
2014	Uyqusiz kecha	Shoira
2013	Senga bir gap aytaman	Jurnalist qiz
2015	Quyoshni sen uygʻotasan	Shabnam
2016	Alisher Navoiy	Guli
2016	Mirza Ulugʻbek	Firuza
2017	Oʻjarlar	Qorakoʻz
2017	Semurgʻ	Semurgʻ
2007	Hasrat bog'i	Kotiba
2008	Uvaysiy	Poshaxon
2012	Mehr-u muhabbatli sakkiz ayol	Syuzon
2018	Abay	Hojar
2018	Keldi-yu ketti	Humora
2019	O'n ikki oy	O'gay qiz
2020	Boborahim Mashrab	Tamara

Music videos
Song title	Artist
"Yomgʻir"	Shohjahon Joʻrayev
"Tut qo'limdan"	Yulduz Usmonova
"Dilozor"	Gulsanam Mamazoitova
"Sevgi"	Via Marakand
"Farishtam"	Shuhrat Zokirov

== Discography ==
=== Music videos ===
Year	Song	Director
2022	"Hayot go'zal"	
2022	"Yorijon"	
2022	"Yuragim sezdi" (featuring Shuhrat Zokirov)	
2022	"Sog Inmabmanmi" ( Akbar Atamuhammedov)	

== Most Popular Songs ==
Here are some of the most popular songs by Dilnoza Kubayeva, often in collaboration with other famous artists:

1. Yangi Yil (with Alisher Fayz)
2. Yuragim Sezdi (with Shuxrat Zokirov)
3. Yuragim Sezdi (with Shuxrat Zokirov)
4. Hayot Monolog
5. Hayot Gozal
6. Sog'indim Onamni
7. Elda Bolsin
8. Iltijo Etaman
9. Odam Bolalari

== Awards ==
- 2012 State Prize Shuhrat medal
- Honored artist of Uzbekistan
- 2022 Honored artist of Karakalpakstan
