= Finnick (film) =

- Russian theatrical release poster
- Directed by: Denis Chernov
- Written by: Tatiana Belova; Denis Chernov; Aleksandr Kim; Neil Landau; Lev Murzenko
- Produced by: Elena Chirkova; Mayank Jhalani; Julia Nikolaeva
- Starring: Voice cast
- Edited by: Arkadiy Muratov
- Music by: Sergey Sidorov
- Production companies: Petersburg Animation Studio; Riki Group with support of Cinema Fund Russia
- Distributed by: Central Partnership
- Release dates: 23 March 2022 (Moscow); 24 March 2022 (Russia)
- Running time: 85 minutes
- Country: Russia
- Language: Russian
- Box office: $10.3 million

Finnick (Russian: Финник, also known as Little Monsters) is a 2022 Russian animated feature film produced by the Riki Group and the Petersburg Animation Studio. It was directed by Denis Chernov. The film premiered on 24 March 2022.

== Synopsis ==
The events of the film occur in a fuctional town of Berg, which resembles St. Petersburg. A girl Chirstina and a domovoy (house spirit) who lives in her house are trying to resolve the mystery of strange events terrorising the town.

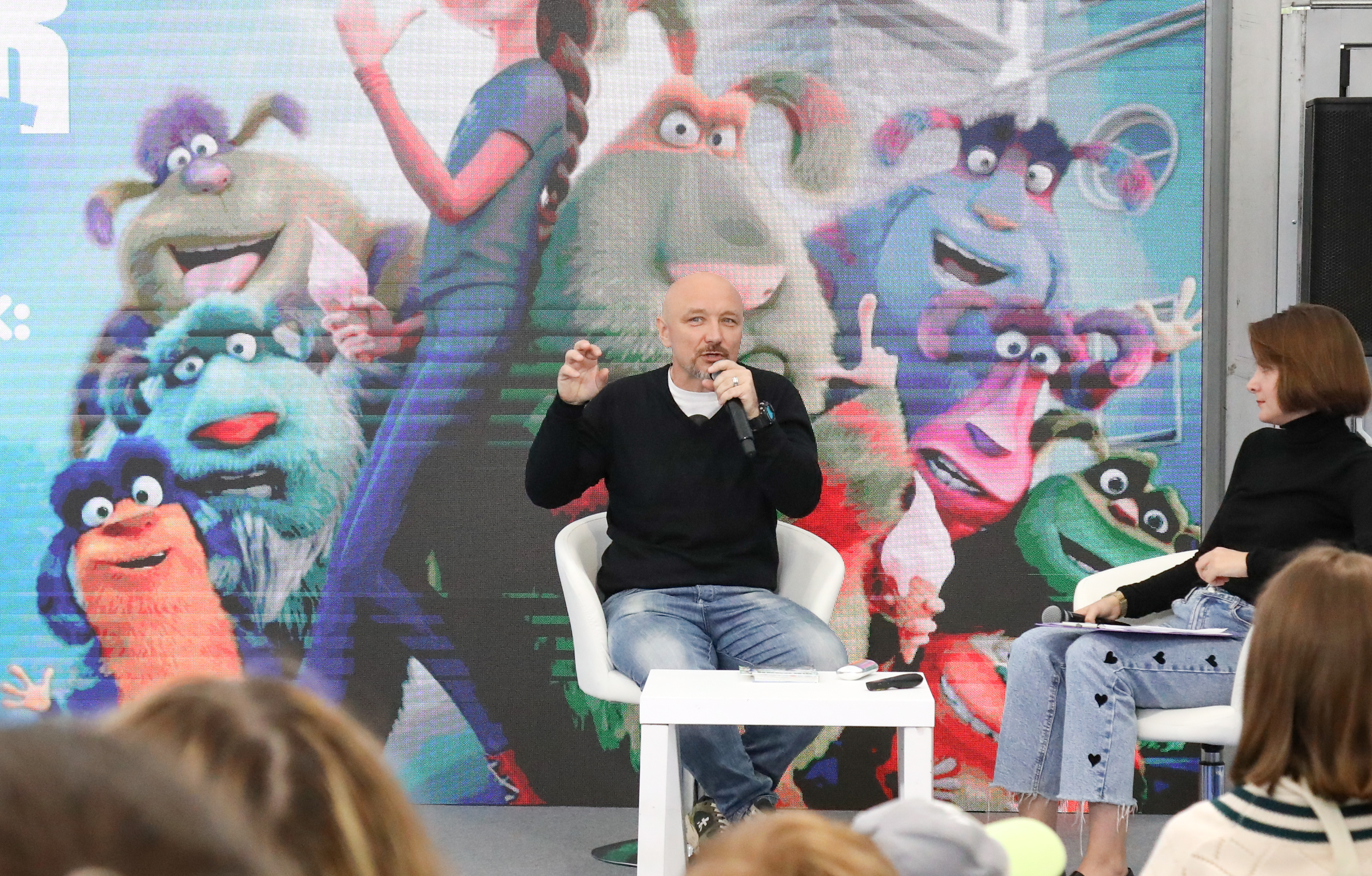
"Finnick: From Film to Book" presentation at the first Moscow International Children's Book Fair (2023). On stage: voice actor Mikhail Khrustalyov (ru) (voice of Finnick).

== Production ==
- Director: Denis Chernov (ru)
- Screenwriter: Tatyana Belova
- Story by: Denis Chernov, Tatyana Belova
- Composer: Sergey Sidorov
- Producers: Elena Chirkova, Ivan Polyakov
- Executive producers: Ilya Popov (ru), Yuliya Nikolayeva
- Writing team: Neil Landau, Lev Murzenko, Aleksandr Kim, Tim Verenko, Jeff Hilton
- Editor: Aleksandr Sinitsyn
- Song "Beautiful Old House": Andrey Knyazev (ru) (KnyaZz) and Helavisa (Melnitsa)
- Production designer: Olga Ovinnikova
- Sound engineers: Igor Yakovel (ru), Denis Dushin
- Character designers: Valeriy Belov, Denis Chernov, Yana Korotayeva
- Production manager: Darya Davydova
- Chief operating officer: Yuliya Nemchina
- Technical director: Oleg Muranov
- Lead line producer: Elena Chugunova
- Line producers: Anastasiya Yakovenko, Dayana Voldiyanova, Mariya Andreyeva
- Executive co-producer: Neil Landau

== Voice cast ==
- Mikhail Khrustalyov (ru) — Finnick
- Veronika Makeeva — Kristina
- Ida Galich (ru) — Kristina's mother
- Boris Dergachyov (ru) — Kristina's father
- Andrey Lyovin (ru) — Jay Bee
- Danya Milokhin (ru) — Tikfin / Hamsterfin / Motyafin
- Aleksandr Gudkov (ru) — Mafyn
- Artur Babich (ru) — Pinkfin / Flyufin
- Lesha Youungeer — Timfin / Tupikfin
- Vlad Levskiy — Punkfin / Finol
- Ten Yujin — Frogfin / Bugfin
- Tyoma Waterfork — Grifin / Alfin
- Ivan Chaban — Mark
- Mikhail Chernyak (ru) — Reporter
- Maksim Sergeev (ru) — Director / Narrator (uncredited)
- Svetlana Kuznetsova-Tsaryova (ru) — Assistant director
- Boris Khasanov (ru) — Grendfazerin
- Vladimir Maslakov (ru) — Blackfin
- Sergey Mardar (ru) — Dogfin
- Valeriy Solovyov (ru) — Detective
- Vladimir Postnikov (ru) — Postman
- Igor Yakovel (ru) — Villain

== Production and release ==
The film was announced in 2018 under the title My Friend Finnick, produced in collaboration with the American company 3Beep and its founder Tim Verenko, with an initial planned release in 2020.

The film premiered on 24 March 2022. Initially, the distributor was set to be Sony Pictures Releasing, but that same month, in response to Russia's invasion of Ukraine, Sony announced it would cease operations in Russia to support humanitarian efforts in Ukraine. The film was eventually distributed by Central Partnership.

The film premiered in Moscow on 23 March 2022, before releasing in cinemas across Russia the next day.

On 28 April 2022, Finnick was released on online streaming platforms Kinopoisk, Okko, and Ivi.

=== Soundtrack ===
For the film's soundtrack, former leader of the band Korol i Shut Andrey Knyazev (ru) and the lead singer of Melnitsa, Helavisa (ru), released the song "Beautiful Old House", a reworking of the song "Cursed Old House" from Korol i Shut's 2001 album As in an Old Tale.

The soundtrack Finnick: Music from the Film was released on 25 March 2022. Music critic Aleksey Mazhayev (ru) reviewed the soundtrack for Intermedia.ru and rated it 8 out of 10.

== Reception ==
=== Critical response ===
- InterMedia, a respected Russian film portal, gave Finnick a score of 8 out of 10 in its review titled "Art Demands Fur". The review praises the film's faithful take on Slavic mythology through the domovoy character, its emotional depth, and the way it thoughtfully modernizes folklore to explore themes of isolation and community.
- TV Mag, in its coverage of the film's release, described Finnick as a "bright family comedy" with a "whimsical detective adventure" setup.

=== Audience response ===
- On KinoCensor, users rate Finnick 7.01 / 10. This positive score reflects appreciation for the film's balance of playful mischief and heartfelt messaging about home and care.
- Afisha.ru user reviews lean favorably: commenters describe the film as "kind and funny", noting that both adults and children can find enjoyment in its humor and design. Many users highlighted the warmth of the story and the charm of its furry protagonist.
- On the review site Otzyv.pro, one user remarked, "the film is full of positivity ... funny, colorful, and kind", recommending it as a perfect pick for quality family time.
- According to IVI, a major Russian streaming service, the film holds a rating of 8.3 / 10. Viewers on the platform praise its "soulful adventure", the depth of the friendship between Finnick and Kristina, and its magical detective storyline.

== Sequels ==
A continuation of the film, an animated TV series titled Detective Finnick, consisting of 26 episodes of seven minutes each, premiered on the channel STS on 25 December 2022.

A sequel to the film, titled Finnick 2, was released nationwide in cinemas on 23 October 2025, three years after the first installment.

== Awards ==
- 2023 – 21st Golden Eagle Awards: winner in the category Best Animated Feature
- 2023 – 28th Open Russian Animation Festival in Suzdal: winner in the category Best Feature Film
- 2023 – Russian National Animation Award Ikar: winner in the Full-Length Feature category
