= Diamond Butterfly =

Russian film award

- Awarded for: Achievements in film from Eurasia and other countries
- Location: Moscow
- Country: Russia
- Presented by: Eurasian Academy of Cinematographic Arts
- First award: 27 November 2025

The Open Eurasian Film Award "Diamond Butterfly" (Russian: Открытая Евразийская кинопремия «Бриллиантовая бабочка») is a Russian film award founded on the initiative of director Nikita Mikhalkov. It is presented by the Eurasian Academy of Cinematographic Arts, which was set up by Russia's Ministry of Culture and the Russian Culture Foundation. The first ceremony took place in Moscow on 27 November 2025.

== History ==
Mikhalkov proposed a Eurasian film award in 2022. That year he presented the idea to the prime minister of Kyrgyzstan, who offered to host the first ceremony at Issyk-Kul.

The academy and the award were presented in Moscow on 22 April 2025. Besides the award, the academy plans master classes, student exchanges and joint projects for young filmmakers. The first ceremony was originally planned for 5 December 2025, but was moved to 27 November and held at Mikhalkov's "12" Workshop theatre.

== Reception ==
Novaya Gazeta nicknamed the award the "Mikhalkoscar". It argued that Mikhalkov accuses Western awards of being political while creating an award that itself follows Russia's political agenda. The Insider noted that one of the first acting prizes went to a long-time friend of Mikhalkov, and reported that the award was funded by Gazprombank and Alfa-Bank.

== Prizes and categories ==
Instead of cash, winners receive a butterfly-shaped statuette and a Yakut diamond. For the best film the diamond is worth the equivalent of $1 million; for each other category it is worth $250,000.

The award has eleven competitive categories: best film, director, screenplay, cinematography, music, actor, actress, supporting actor, supporting actress, production design, and best film from a country outside the Eurasian region. A further prize is given for contribution to world cinema.

Category	Winner	Film	Country	Ref.
Best Film	Xu Zheng (director)	Against the Current	China	
Best Director	Goran Radovanović	The Erl-King	Serbia	
Best Actress	Svetlana Kryuchkova		Russia	
Best Actor	Aleksandr Adabashyan	Two in One Life, Not Counting the Dog	Russia	
Best Supporting Actress	Sonya Hussyn	Termite	Pakistan	
Best Cinematography	Talant Akynbekov	Black, Red, Yellow	Kyrgyzstan	
Best Production Design	Meylis Hudayberenov	Composer	Turkmenistan	
Contribution to world cinema	Majid Majidi		Iran	

== See also ==
- Nika Award
- Golden Eagle Award
- Ikar Award
- Cinema of Russia
- Nikita Mikhalkov
