= Ilhaq =

- Directed by: Jahongir Ahmedov
- Written by: Jahongir Ahmedov, Xasan Toshxo’jayev
- Produced by: Firdavs Abdukhalikov; Zafar Yuldashev
- Starring: Dilorom Karimova; Dilrabo Mirzaeva; Fotik Nasimov; Ma’rifat Ortiqova; Dilnavoz Axmedova; Toxir Saidov; Ra'no Zokirova; Xusan Rashidov; Bunyod Rahmatullaev; Iskandar Elmurodov; Yigitali Mamajonov
- Cinematography: Jahongir Ibragimov
- Music by: Donyor Agzamov
- Production companies: Uzbekistan Cinematography Agency; Ezgu Film
- Release date: May 9, 2020
- Running time: 136 min. / 2ch. 16 min.
- Country: Uzbekistan
- Languages: Uzbek; Russian; English; Kazakh; Tajik; Kyrgyz; Turkish

Ilhaq (rus. Илхак uzb. Ilhaq) is a 2020 Uzbek military drama directed and written by Jahongir Akhmedov. The Film Agency of Uzbekistan acted as the general producer of the film. The film is the first joint project with the "Belarusfilm" studio. According to the creators of the film, the script is based on the work of Zulfiya Zokirova "Life". The picture tells about the resilience of a mother who lost five children during the Great Patriotic War. Starring Dilorom Karimova, Tahir Saidov, Dilrabo Mirzayeva Fotik Nasimov and Husan Rashidov. The tape was released on May 9, 2020.

The premiere of the film "Ilhak", based on the events of life, is dedicated to the 75th anniversary of the Great Patriotic War, took place on May 9, 2020, on all TV channels of Uzbekistan, including «Sevimli TV», «MY5», «Zoʻr TV», «Milliy TV». The film was the first in Uzbekistan to be released in theaters after restrictions due to the COVID-19 pandemic.

== Plot ==
The film "Ilhak" is based on real events. The basis was a story from the life of Zulfiya Zokirova during the Second World War. Zulfiya sends all her sons to war, but they all die. Four of them had wives who later never remarried. Zulfiya will hope for the rest of her life that her children will return, even though she receives black letters.

== Creation ==
The film "Ilhak" was created specifically by order of the Cinematography Agency of Uzbekistan in 2019 for the 75th anniversary of the Great Patriotic War.

The shooting of the film was entrusted to the film company "EZGU Film". The most famous cultural figures of Uzbekistan and Belarus acted as actors.

The atmosphere of the era of that time was revived at the film site "EZGU Film". In cooperation with a creative team from Belarus, scenery was built on 5 hectares of land: cities and battlefields. World War II buildings were erected and houses typical of the period were built.

== Cast ==
- Dilorom Karimova - Zulfiya Zokirova
- Dilrabo Mirzaeva - Hidoyat
- Fotik Nasimov — Muxammajon Xolmatov
- Ma’rifat Ortiqova – Lazokat
- Dilnavoz Axmedova - Hamroniso
- Toxir Saidov - Mardon Rais
- Ra'no Zokirova - Nazira
- Xusan Rashidov - Vahobjon Xolmatov
- Bunyod Rahmatullaev - Yusufjon Xolmatov
- Iskandar Elmurodov - Ahmadjon Xolmatov
- Yigitali Mamajonov - Shokir
- Viktor Bogushevich
- Alla Poplavskaya
- Lolita Toborko
- Ilona Raenko
- Dmitriy Mashko
- Gennadiy Churikov
- Ekaterina Ermalovich
- Konstantin Pronkin
- Mixail Kaminskiy
- Nikita Kratovich
- Aleksandr Orlovskiy
- Aleksandr Tkachenok

== Sound post-production ==
Sound director Anvar Fayzullayev. Sound design Donyor Agzamov. CineLab sound post-production complex. Dolby Digital 5.1

=== Music ===
The music for the film "Ilhaq" was written Donyor Agzamov.

== Awards and nominations ==
- Winner of the Grand Prix of the International Film Festival "Falling Leaves" (for the film "Ilhak") (2021)
- Winner in the nomination "Best Film" of the National Film Festival "Oltin Khumo" (2021)
- Winner in the nomination "Best Sound Engineer" of the National Film Festival "Oltin Khumo" (2021) (Anvar Fayzullaev)
