= Boysun =

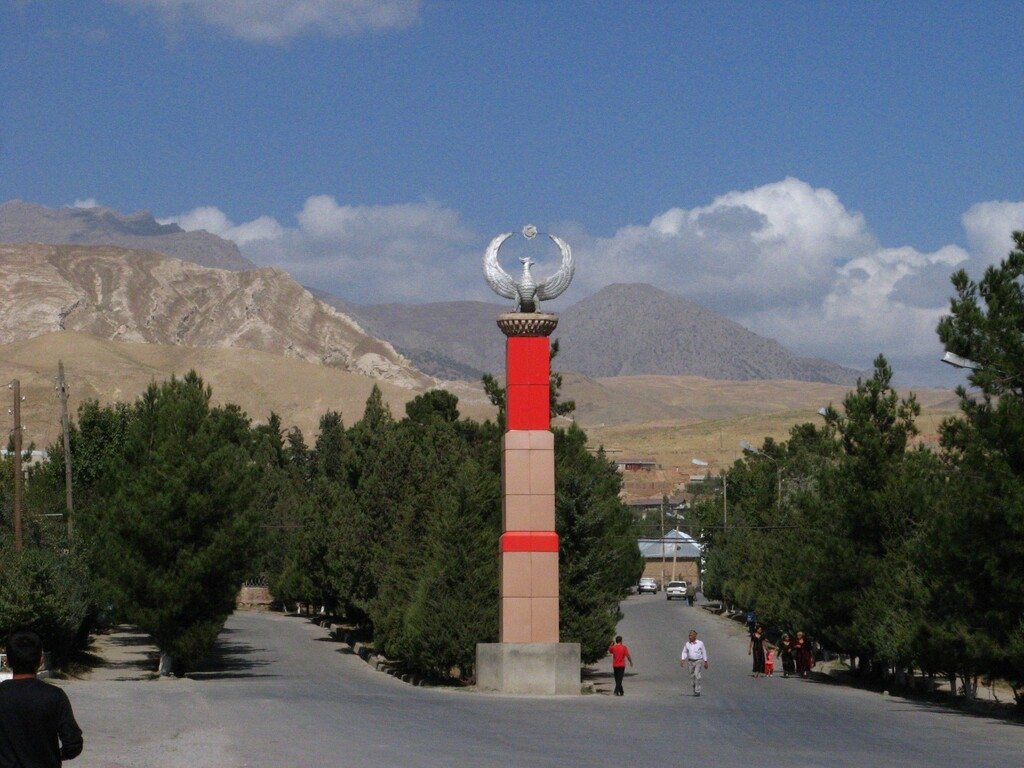
- View of Boysun

- Location in Uzbekistan
- Coordinates: 38°12′N 67°12′E
- Country: Uzbekistan
- Region: Surxondaryo Region
- District: Boysun District
- Elevation: 1,217 m (3,993 ft)

Population (2016)
  - Total: 27,600

Boysun (Uzbek: Boysun, Russian: Байсун, romanized: Baysun) is a city in Surxondaryo Region, Uzbekistan and capital of Boysun District. The population was 16,732 as of the 1989 census, and 27,600 in 2016.

== History ==
Boysun is one of the oldest inhabited places in the Surxondaryo Region of Uzbekistan. It is located to the northwest of Boysun in the Teshiktosh mountains. It is known that people have lived in Boysun for approximately the last 5,000 years. From the 1st century BC to the 1st century AD, Boysun was the location of a fortified city called "Poikalon". From the 6th to 13th centuries, another city, Bosand, was situated in the Boysun area and was one of the cities of Chaghaniyan. Bosand is also mentioned as such in Abu Ishaq al-Istakhri's "Book of Roads and Kingdoms." "Hudud al-'Alam" describes Bosand as a place with a large and militant population. Bosand was strategically located on the trade route between Chaghaniyan and Samarkand, passing through the Iron Gate. The exteriors of the houses are adorned with colorful patterns, and decorated with felt and embroidered hangings. In the streets along the walls, there are large clay dishes and water reservoirs. The Teshik-Tash cave, where Neanderthal remains were found, is world famous. Mesolithic era "magic bull hunt" wall paintings can be seen nearby in the Kugitang Mountains.

According to archaeological sources, life in Bosand has continued from the early centuries until the Islamic period. The city was later reconstructed with a fortification wall. The Boysun treasure is also mentioned in the "Zafarnama." In the 19th century, Boysun was a center of one of the three bekliks in the Bukhara Emirate in the Surxondaryo region, and it was inhabited by the indigenous Uzbek population.

== Etymology ==
The Chig'atoy tribe, a Turkic group, named the place "Boysun." The name "Boysun" is derived from the ancient Turkish words "boy" and "sin," meaning "great mountain" or "big mountain." In ancient Turkic tribes, among various ways of referring to different things, toponyms often included references to mountains, which were considered sacred. According to local traditions, powerful people from ancient Turkic tribes lived in this area, and the name "Biysun" means "the abode of the powerful" or "the settlement of the mighty."

== Geography ==
Boysun lies in a valley running through a hilly region and overlooked by the Boysuntoq Ridge of the Gissar Range, which rises to 3,100 metres (10,200 ft) here and as even higher to the west. The landscape is dramatic but arid, and varies from grassy areas to exposed rock.

== Climate ==
Boysun has a Mediterranean climate (Köppen: Csa), with cool winters and hot summers. Rainfall is generally light and erratic. Autumn is the wettest season, while summers are very dry.

Climate data for Boysun (1991–2020)
Month	Jan	Feb	Mar	Apr	May	Jun	Jul	Aug	Sep	Oct	Nov	Dec	Year
Mean daily maximum °C (°F)	7.3 (45.1)	8.7 (47.7)	13.8 (56.8)	19.5 (67.1)	25.0 (77.0)	30.4 (86.7)	33.2 (91.8)	32.3 (90.1)	27.9 (82.2)	21.2 (70.2)	14.2 (57.6)	9.7 (49.5)	20.3 (68.5)
Daily mean °C (°F)	2.3 (36.1)	3.7 (38.7)	8.5 (47.3)	13.7 (56.7)	18.4 (65.1)	23.3 (73.9)	25.5 (77.9)	24.1 (75.4)	19.5 (67.1)	13.2 (55.8)	7.8 (46.0)	4.2 (39.6)	13.7 (56.7)
Mean daily minimum °C (°F)	−1.8 (28.8)	−0.6 (30.9)	3.9 (39.0)	8.2 (46.8)	12.0 (53.6)	16.0 (60.8)	17.9 (64.2)	16.4 (61.5)	12.2 (54.0)	6.9 (44.4)	2.9 (37.2)	−0.1 (31.8)	7.8 (46.0)
Average precipitation mm (inches)	56.8 (2.24)	73.6 (2.90)	91.2 (3.59)	76.5 (3.01)	54.4 (2.14)	13.1 (0.52)	4.6 (0.18)	0.6 (0.02)	2.4 (0.09)	14.3 (0.56)	42.4 (1.67)	49.7 (1.96)	479.6 (18.88)
Average precipitation days (≥ 1.0 mm)	12	13	13	11	9	4	1	0	1	3	9	10	86
Average relative humidity (%)	77	73	67	57	49	47	48	51	54	59	69	77	61
Mean monthly sunshine hours	116.6	142.3	168.8	220.8	318.8	360.6	374.1	356.0	287.6	219.2	151.2	101.9	2,817.9
Source: NOAA (humidity, sun 1961-1990)

== Population ==
Historical population
Year	1979	1989	2005
Pop.	12,438	16,732	23,700
±%	—	+34.5%	+41.6%

== Transportation ==
The main road through the town is Route P-105. This connects with the M39 to the west near Shorab, leading to Dehqonobod, Gʻuzor, Shahrisabz and Samarkand further north, and to Akkurgon and Termez further south. To the east, P-105 connects to Shoʻrchi and Qumqoʻrgʻon.

== World Heritage Status ==
This site was added to the UNESCO World Heritage Tentative List on 18 January 2008 in the Mixed (Cultural and Natural) category.
