= Tashkent International Film Festival =

Film Festival

- Location: Tashkent, Samarkand
- Founded: 1958
- Founded by: Uzbekfilm
- Directors: Firdavs Abdukhalikov, Shuhrat Rizayev
- Producers: Furkat Usmanov
- Website: https://tiffest.uz/

Tashkent International Film Festival (Toshkent xalqaro kinofestivali) is an annual cinematographic festival held in the format of a "festival of festivals". It was founded in 1958 as an International Festival of Asian and African Countries. Since 1976, it has been an international festival of Asian, African, and Latin American countries. For these reasons, the film festival existed until 1988. After Uzbekistan gained independence, it was held only twice (1992 and 1997) under the name Tashkent International Film Festival. It was revived in 2021 under the name Tashkent International Film Festival "Pearl of the Silk Road". It is held in Tashkent in the second half of the year.

== History ==
The first Tashkent Film Festival was held in 1958. The next film festival took place only in 1968 and became relatively regular until 1988 (in 1970, the film festival did not occur). The film festivals were organized by the State Cinema of the USSR and the Union of Cinematographers of the USSR with the participation of the State Cinema of the USSR and the Union of Cinematographers of the USSR.

The festival was not competitive, according to the results of the screenings, prizes, and commemorative medals of various public organizations were awarded, which were awarded in a solemn atmosphere on the stage of the Tashkent Opera and Ballet Theater named after A. Navoi (for example, there was a Prize of the Soviet Committee of Solidarity of Asian and African Countries). The festival program included screenings of new films of various genres and directions, various information programs, discussion clubs and round tables, and a film market.

The honor of opening the first Tashkent festival fell to the film "Storm over Asia" directed by Kamil Yarmatov.

The first festival was attended by 49 representatives of Asian and African states, by the mid-1980s their number had doubled. The guests of the festival were famous cinematographers, cultural workers, public and political figures. During the years of independence of Uzbekistan, the Film Festival was held in 1992 and 1997.

== Reborn ==
The Film Festival was revived in 2021 in accordance with the decree of the President of Uzbekistan "On the revival and holding of the Tashkent International Film Festival" as the annual Tashkent International Film Festival "Pearl of the Silk Road" under the leadership of the Director General of the film festival Firdavs Abdukhalikov, under the leadership of the XIII-XV festivals from 2021 to 2023. The task of the directorate and the main customer of the Film Festival was the Center for the Development of National Cinematography of Uzbekistan.

Based on the Decree of the President of Uzbekistan No. 5151 "On the revival and holding of the Tashkent International Film Festival", the customer and organizer of the Festival is the Center for the Development of National Cinematography of Uzbekistan.

On 28 September – 3 October 2021, the XIII Tashkent International Film Festival "Pearl of the Silk Road" was held. On 14 – 19 September 2022, the XIV Tashkent International Film Festival was held with the participation of 400 cinematographers from 40 foreign countries and more than 1.5 thousand students.

The revived film festival supports the traditions laid down during the International Film Festival of Asia, Africa, and Latin America. Cinematographers from all over the world come to Tashkent, and new films are shown, including co-production films created with the participation of Uzbek cinema

The main program of the past film festivals, in addition to film screenings, included the competition program "Cinema in 5 days", signing of memoranda of cooperation, presentations of new film projects, as well as innovations in the Cinema House and in the Uzbekfilm studio.

Among the guests who attended the revived film festival in 2021–2023 are Luc Besson, Takeshi Kitano, Armand Assante, Krzysztof Zanussi, Nikita Mikhalkov, Kevin Spacey, Sami Naseri, Burak Ozchivit, Nurgül Yeşilçay, Dilan Çiçek Deniz, Melissa Asly Pamuk, Rustam Sagdullaev, Franco Nero, Mithun Chakraborty, Gerard Depardieu, Sergey Bezrukov, Poonam Dhillon, Timur Bekmambetov, Taukel Musilim, Zinat Aman, Umesh Mehra and many others. In addition to participating in the film festival, the guests gave master classes to the students and held creative meetings.

In 2023, the XV anniversary Film Festival was held

== Awards ==
- 1968 – The Death of a pawnbroker (1966) dir. T. Sabirov – Diploma
- 1976 – The Legend of Siyavush (1976) dir. B. Kimyagarov – Diploma
- 1984 – Hostage (1983) dir. Yu. Yusupov – Diploma
- 2021 – The Return to Dreams (2023 – Uzbekkino, Japan, Spain and Argentina – Jeonju ISFF, Korea finalist with Cannes Queer Palm winner) and NOH Men (2021) dir. Kimi Meguro – New Generation section
- Within the framework of the XIV Tashkent International Film Festival, Takeshi Kitano and Krzysztof Zanussi were awarded prizes for "Their contribution to the development of world cinema"

The XV Film Festival, "For their contribution to the development of world cinema", was awarded to directors Irakli Kvirikadze, Alexander Sokurov and Pietro Marcello.
