= Center for the Development of National Cinematography of Uzbekistan =

Uzbek non-governmental organization

Centre for the Development of National Cinematography of Uzbekistan
- O‘zbekiston Milliy kinematografiyani rivojlantirish markazi
- Abbreviation: CDNC
- Formation: 27 April 2021 (5 years ago)
- Headquarters: Tashkent, Alisher Navoi Street 15
- Region served: Uzbekistan
- Official language: Uzbek
- Director: Furkat Usmanov
- Main organ: The Cinematography Agency of Uzbekistan
- Website: cdnc.uz

The Centre for the Development of National Cinematography of Uzbekistan (Uzbek: O‘zbekiston Milliy kinematografiyani rivojlantirish markazi) is a non-governmental non-profit organization established by decree of the president of Uzbekistan Shavkat Mirziyoyev to develop and support national cinematographers both within the republic and internationally.

== History of creation ==
The proposal to establish the Center for the Development of National Cinematography of Uzbekistan was approved by the president of the Republic under Decree No. 6202 of April 7, 2021, “On measures to raise the film art and film industry to a qualitatively new level and further improve the system of state support for the industry.”. In November 2021, the center was launched under the founding of the Cinematography Agency of Uzbekistan and representatives of the film industry. In November 2021, the center was launched under the founding of the Uzbekistan Cinematography Agency and representatives of film art. The first head of the organization was film critic Barno Ungbaeva. In March 2022, Maruf Mukhtorov became the new director of the center. Ungbaeva remained at the center as an official representative and press secretary. In June 2023, uzbek filmmaker Furkat Usmanov was elected as a director of the center by a decision of the Board of Directors of the Center for the Development of National Cinematography of Uzbekistan.

== Tasks ==
Based on Decree No. 6202 “On Measures to Raise the Film Art and Film Industry to a Qualitatively New Level and Further Improve the System of State Support for the Industry” the main objectives of the center are:

Financial support for the production of national films and serials, as well as the joint creation of film products;

Organizing, on the basis of market principles, the distribution of films produced on the basis of state orders;

Attracting domestic and foreign investors to finance the production, distribution and exhibition of national films;

Financing the subtitling and dubbing of national films into foreign languages and of the best world films into the national language;

Ensuring the participation of national films in international film festivals and the organization of national and international film forums;

Supporting the Creative Union of Cinematographers of Uzbekistan and non-governmental non-profit organizations engaged in protecting the rights of representatives of the film art and film industry through the allocation of grants and social orders.

Based on Presidential Decree No. 5060 ‘On improving the system of state management in the field of cinematography and creating decent conditions for the creative activity of the sphere's representatives’ the centre's responsibilities include:

Improving the system of financing the creation of high-budget national films based on world experience and the creation of multi-part films about historical personalities;

Forming a database for the State Unitary Enterprise ‘Centre for Documentary and Chronicle Films’;

Participation in the work of the film commission and the Oscar Committee of Uzbekistan;

Protection of copyright.

On the basis of Presidential Decree No. 5151 ‘On the revival and holding of the Tashkent International Film Festival’, the centre was entrusted with the tasks of directing and ordering the revived Tashkent International Film Festival ‘Pearl of the Silk Road’.

According to the Presidential Decree of 05.06.2024 ‘On measures for the further development of the cinematography sphere and the creation of a cycle of films dedicated to the history of the country’, a school for the training and retraining of specialists with secondary special education for the cinematography sphere is being created at the centre.

== Projects ==
The following feature films were produced by the Centre in cooperation with private studios based on the results of the pitching competition:

- ‘Say, Daddy!’ (2022)
- ‘The history of a disease’ (2022)
- ‘Dorboz’ (2023)
- ‘Towards the Goal’ (2023)
- ‘September Flowers’ (2023)
- ‘Phenomenon’ (2023)
- ‘I Don't Remember’ (2023)
- ‘Mirage’ (2024)
- ‘Odina’ (2024)
- ‘Pride’ (2024–2025)
- Pearls of archaeological sites of Uzbekistan (2024)
- Magic jug (2024)
- Shakhobiddin Marzhoniy (2024)
- Bahodir Yalangtush (2025)

== See also ==
- Cinema of Uzbekistan
- Tashkent International Film Festival
- Uzbekfilm
