= Korkut Ata Film Festival of the Turkic World =

Annual film festival organized by TÜRKSOY

- Established: 2021
- Founded by: TÜRKSOY
- Website: https://korkutatafilmfestivali.com/

Korkut Ata Film Festival of the Turkic World is an annual film festival hosted by TÜRKSOY since 2021. Its name comes from Korkut Ata, Turkic narrator in the Book of Dede Korkut.

== History ==
The first ever film festival of the Turkic world. It is organized by the Turkish Ministry of Culture and Tourism in 2021. Dozens of filmmakers from 13 countries take part in the Festivals. In addition to Turkey, these are Kazakhstan, Uzbekistan, Kyrgyzstan, Azerbaijan, Turkmenistan, Hungary, Moldova Rep. (Gagauzia), Iran, Ukraine and the Turkish Republic of Northern Cyprus, as well as the Turkic regions of Russia (Bashkortostan, Tatarstan, Yakutia and others).

It is believed that the Festival is intended to preserve the piety, patriotism and feelings of the Turkic peoples, paying tribute to their great ancestors. In a study on the post-COVID-19 period in Turkey, the Film Festival is cited as one of the successful practices aimed at restoring the tourism sector.

== Editions ==
=== 1st Film Festival ===
The first film festival was held in Istanbul, Turkey in 10–12 November 2021, with award ceremony on 12 November.

- Best Film: (Azerbaijan) “In Between Dying” directed by Hilal Baydarov
- Best Documentary:
  1. (Iran) “Twins” directed by Muhammed Alimuradi
  2. (Uzbekistan) “People's Courage” directed by Ali Hamroyev
  3. (Russia) “Linguist directed” by Eduard Novikov
- Best Film Director: (Kyrgyzstan) Artykpai Suyundukov with "Shambala"
- Special Award of the Jury: (Turkey) “Mavzer” directed by Fatih Özcan, (Uzbekistan) “Passion” directed by Rashid Malikov
- Contributions to Turkic Culture:
  - (Azerbaijan) Baku Media Center
  - Cinema Agency of Uzbekistan
  - (Kazakhstan) Kazakhfilm
  - (Kyrgyzstan) Kyrgyz Cinema Film Studios
  - (Turkey) Turkish Radio and Television Corporation

=== 2nd Film Festival ===
Second film festival was held in Bursa, Turkey in 1–5 November 2022. Bursa was the 2022 capital for the Culture and Arts Capital of the Turkic World. The competition was held in two categories: feature films and documentary films. Also, four screening categories were held: historical panorama, contemporary human landscape, turquoise documentary zone and animation.

- Best Film: (Uzbekistan) Kadının Kısmeti directed by Dilmurod Masaidov
- Best Film Director: (Azerbaijan) Vagif Mustafayev with "Life Seems to Be Beautiful"
- Best Scenario: (Turkey) Commitment Hasan by Semih Kaplanoğlu
- Best Documentary:
  1. (Uzbekistan) “Inson” directed by Furkat Usmanov
  2. (Kazakhstan) “Avrasya'nın Hükümranları” script by Aigul Cherendinova
  3. (Turkey) Balkanların Türkçe Hafızası by İsmet Arasan
- Best actress: (Kyrgyzstan) Kalipa Tashtanova
- Best actor: (Kazakhstan) Kayrat Kemalov
- Fidelity Awards: (Turkey) Türkan Şoray, (Turkey) Osman Sınav
- Special Award: (Uzbekistan) Yulduz Rajabova
- Contributions to Turkic Culture: (Kyrgyzstan) Sadyk Sher-Niyaz, (Turkmenistan) Arslan Eyeberdiev, (Uzbekistan) Rano Shodiyeva, (Kazakhstan) Kanat Torebay, (Turkey) Mehmet Bozdağ

=== 3rd Edition ===
Third film festival was held in Baku, Azerbaijan between 8-11 October 2023. A special visit was planned to Shusha, as it was the 2023 capital for the Culture and Arts Capital of the Turkic World.

- Best Film: (Turkey) "Star Dust" directed by Ahmet Sonmez
- Best Director: (Kyrgyzstan) Asel Juraeva for "God Gave"
- Best Screenplay: (Uzbekistan) Abdulla Oripov
- Best Documentary:
  1. (Azerbaijan) "The Last"
  2. (Kazakhstan) "Argau"
  3. (Uzbekistan) "My Apartment"
- Best Actress: (Azerbaijan) Tehmine Rafaella in "Maryam"
- Best Actor: (Turkmenistan) Ahmet Amandurdiyev in "Red Apple"
- Special Award of TURKSOY: (Azerbaijan) Fakhraddin Manafov
- Special Award of the Festival: (Azerbaijan) Hamida Omarova, (Azerbaijan) Ogtay Mirgasimov, (Azerbaijan) Orman Aliyev, (Azerbaijan) Agasi Memmedli, (Kazakhstan) Azamat Satybaldy, (Uzbekistan) Firdavs Abdulhalikov, (Turkey) Serdar Gökhan, (Turkey) Metin Günay, (Turkmenistan) Khodzhakuli Narliev, (Turkmenistan) Maya-Gozel Aimedova and (Turkmenistan) Charlıyar Seyidli
- Special Award of the Jury: (Kazakhstan) "Jambyl" directed by Dosjan Janbotaev and (Turkey) "Always 33 Years Old" directed by Murat Pay

=== 4th Edition ===
Fourth film festival was held in Ashgabat, Turkmenistan between 13-15 November 2024.

- Best Documentary:
  1. (Turkmenistan) "Aleme Belgilidir"
  2. (Turkey) "Vaveyla"
  3. (Kazakhstan) "The Beginning of the Wind"
- Best film: (Uzbekistan) (Turkmenistan) "Magtumguly Fragi"
- Best Director: (Turkey) Hakan Yonat for "Sadık Ahmet"
- Best Actress: (Turkmenistan) D. Melayeva
- Best Actor: (Kazakhstan) D. Urazayev
- Best Screenplay: (Kyrgyzstan) "Error 404"
- Special Award of the Jury: (Turkmenistan) "Composer"
- Special Prize of the Jury: (Uzbekistan) "Right Go, Salametle Gel" and (Bashkortostan) "Monisto"
- Special Award of the Festival: (Turkmenistan) N. Allaberdiyev, (Kazakhstan) S. Tekeyev, (Kyrgyzstan) A. Nazarqulova, (Turkey) E. Konuk and (Uzbekistan) Sh. Rızayev
- Special Award of TURKSOY: (Kyrgyzstan) M. Musayev

=== 5th Edition ===
Fifth film festival was held in Aktau, Kazakhstan in 2025.

=== 6th Edition ===
Sixth film festival was held in İstanbul, Turkey between 3-7 November 2026.

- Best film: Kanto – Ensar Altay (Turkey)
- Best Director: Tağıyev: Mektep – Zaur Gasımlı (Azerbaijan)
- Best Screenplay: Yusuf – Taalaibek Kulmendeev (Kyrgyzstan)
- Best Actress: Amina Salmanova – Farzana Batıya Gidiyor (Bashkortostan)
- Best Actor: Matyokub Matçonov – Farz (Uzbekistan)
- Special Award of the Jury: 38: Son Nokta – Torebek Beisebayev (Kazakhstan)
- Special Award of TURKSOY: Gürgenç Güzeli Törebeg – Vefa Ishangulyev (Turkmenistan)
- Documentary
  1. Isıyah: Yaz Gün Dönümü – Semyon Amanatov, Mikhail Lukachevskiy, Sardaana Barabanova, Radomir Tomskiy, Lubov Borisova (Sakha Republic)
  2. Hayata Susamışlık – Muminjon Tursunov (Uzbekistan)
  3. Sönmeyen Ateş – Tunç Boran (Turkey)
- Special Award of the Jury: Azıh Mağarası: Azerbaycan'ın Beşiği – Atakan Kerküklü (Azerbaijan) – (Turkey)
- Shortfilm
  1. Rehber – Mert Erez (Turkey)
  2. Büyükanne – Temirlan Orısbayev (Kazakhstan)
  3. Güneş Çocuk Yusuf – Suhrob Qodirov and Dilshod Usmonov (Uzbekistan)
