= Yolqin Toʻychiyev =

Uzbek film director

Yalkin Tuychiev (born 1977), also written Elkin Tuychiev, Yolqin Tuychiev, Yolkin Tuychiev, Yolqin Toʻychiyev, is a filmmaker from Uzbekistan. He is known for the award-winning films 2000 Songs of Farida (2020) and P.S. (2010), and both directs films and writes the scripts for them.

== Early life and education ==
Tuychiev was born in 1977 in Tashkent, then a state of the Soviet Union known as the Uzbek Soviet Socialist Republic.

He attended the Uzbekistan State Institute of Arts and Culture in Tashkent, graduating in 1999. The following year he attended the High Courses for Scriptwriters and Film Directors in Moscow, graduating in 2002.

== Films ==
His films have been selected to several film festivals including the Moscow, Tokyo, Tallinn, Busan and Adelaide Film Festivals.

His films (as director and writer unless otherwise indicated) include:

- Teenager (2005)
- Chashma (2006)
- Kechikkan hayot (2010) (writer)
- P.S. (2010)
- Afgʻon (2012)
- Dunyo (2012)
- House for Mermaids (2015)
- Maʼsuma (2016)
- Born Out of the Ashes (2019) (writer)
- 2000 Songs of Farida (2020)
- Evrilish (2022)
- The Grand Amir and Donna Maria" (2025)

== Awards ==
Chasma won "Best Film of the Perspectives Competition" at the Moscow Film Festival in 2006.

Tuychiev was co-winner of the Golden Cyclo Award at the Vesoul International Film Festival of Asian Cinema, for his film P.S. in 2011, sharing the award with Liu Hao.
