= Ikar Award =

Animation award in Russia

- Awarded for: Professional achievement in Russian animation
- Location: Moscow
- Country: Russia
- Presented by: Open Russian Festival of Animated Film; Union of Cinematographers of Russia; Association of Animation Cinema
- Reward: Glass statuette of Icarus
- First award: 2015
- Website: ikaraward.ru

The Ikar Award (Russian: Национальная анимационная премия «Икар», romanized: Nacional'naya animacionnaya premiya Ikar) is a Russian national animation award. It is presented for professional achievements and contributions to the development of the industry. The award is given annually on Russian Animation Day, April 8. The initiator and artistic director of the award is Sergey Kapkov.

== History ==
The award was established in 2014. The first ceremony took place on April 8, 2015, at the Central House of Cinematographers, funded by leading animation studios of the country. Distinctive features of the event from the very beginning were the animated stage and hall decorations in the style of a famous Russian animated film, as well as an animation jam session of collective authorship. The very first experience – the video clip "Tender Owls" (Russian: Совы нежные) – became a viral video on the Internet.

In 2020, due to the pandemic, the ceremony was postponed to September 7 and was held in the Engineering Building of the Tretyakov Gallery. In 2021, the ceremony took place on September 9 at the renovated Khudozhestvenny cinema. In 2022, animators gathered on June 5 at the theater "School of Modern Play".

The award winners are determined by an expert council elected by general voting of the animation community. Initially, it included 35 authoritative representatives of the industry; since 2017, the number has increased to 50.

- Creative producer of the award — director Alyona Oyatyeva
- Executive producer — Alexandra Konstantinova
- General director — producer Alexander Gerasimov

== Founders ==
- Open Russian Festival of Animated Film
- Union of Cinematographers of Russia
- Association of Animation Cinema

== Ikar statuette ==
External image
- Ikar statuette

The prize of the National Animation Award is a glass figurine of Icarus. Its author is art director and stylist of the ceremony, laureate of the Russian Government Prize, Alexander Khramtsov. The character prototype is a stylized hero of Fyodor Khitruk’s animated film "Icarus and the Wise Men" (1976).

== See also ==
- Nika Award
- Golden Eagle Award
- Icarus
- Russian animation
- Open Russian Festival of Animated Films
- Union of Cinematographers of the Russian Federation
- List of animation awards
- Cinema of Russia
