= Oltin humo =

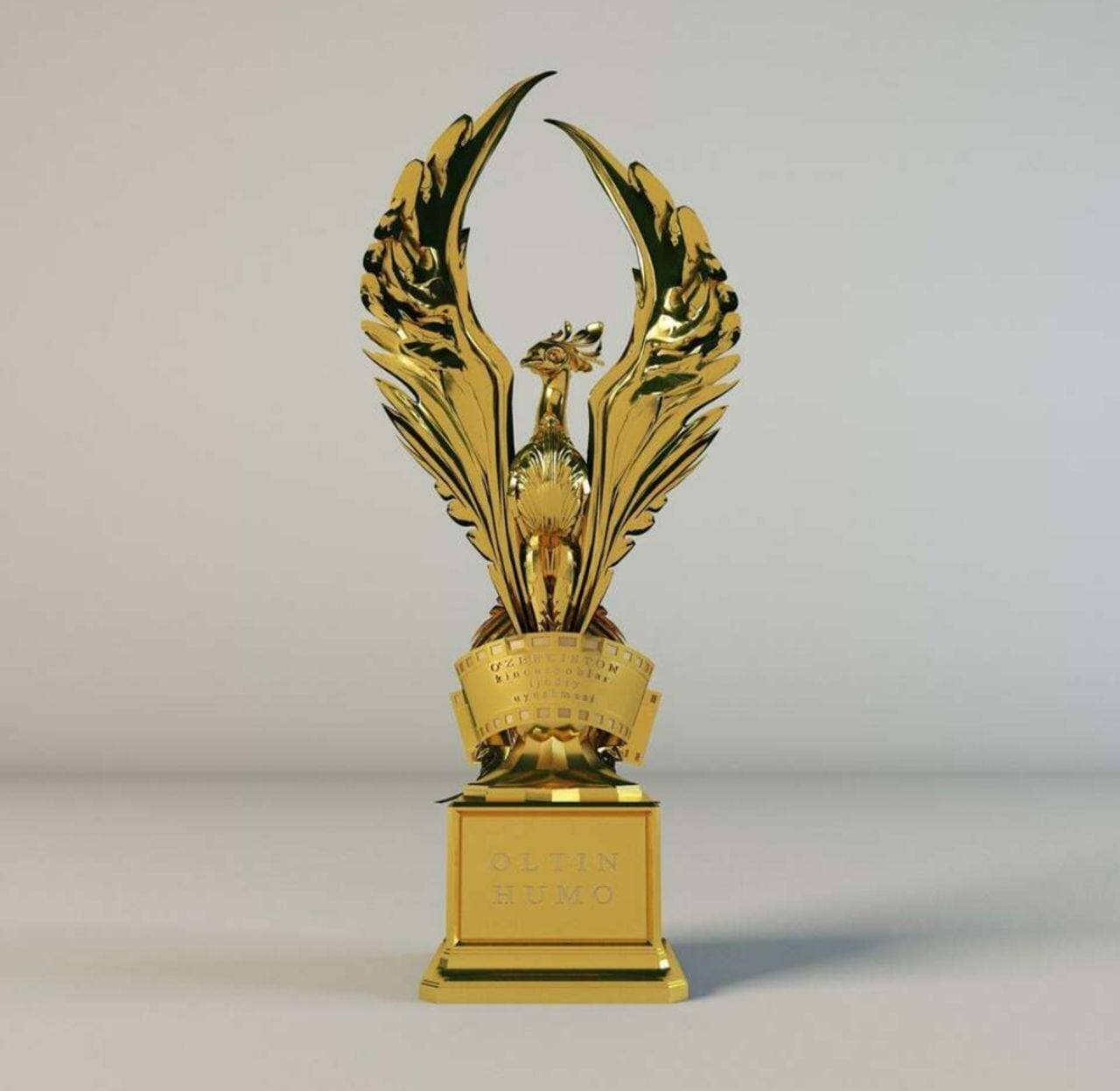
- Statuette presented by "Oltin humo"
- Type: Cinematography
- Country: Uzbekistan
- Presented by: The Union of Cinematographers of Uzbekistan
- First award: 2019

Oltin humo is an annual award presented by the Union of Cinematographers of Uzbekistan. Oltin humo was established as a film presentation and held on April 10, 2019, for the first time. It aims to reward the filmmakers in Uzbekistan.

== History ==
=== Similar awards ===
- Oscar
- BAFTA
- Golden Globe
- Palme d'Or

== Nominations ==
- "Special "Oltin humo" award for the contributions to the Uzbek cinematography"
- "The best documentary"
- "The best animation film"
- "The best computer graphics"
- "The best sound director"
- "The best make-up artist"
- "The best edit"
- "The best costume artist"
- "The best artist"
- "The best composer"
- "The best screenplay"
- "The best cinematographer"
- "The best director"
- "The best female actor"
- "The best male actor"
- "The film that won the love of the audience"
- "The best film"

== "Oltin humo" - 2019 ==
Oltin humo film presentation was held on April 10, 2019, at "Turkistan" art's hall for the first time. In the ceremony, the films made during 2017-2018 were awarded by 17 nominations.

Nomination	Nominee
Special "Oltin humo" award for the contributions to the Uzbek cinematography	Baxtiyot Ikhtiyorov
Special "Oltin humo" award for the contributions to the Uzbek cinematography	Abdurahim Ismoilov
Special "Oltin humo" award for the contributions to the Uzbek cinematography	Qamara Kamalova
Special "Oltin humo" award for the contributions to the Uzbek cinematography	Sayram Isayeva
Special "Oltin humo" award for the contributions to the Uzbek cinematography	Khayrulla Saʼdiyev
Special "Oltin humo" award for the contributions to the Uzbek cinematography	Khabibulla Fayziyev
The best documentary	"Ikki elning suyukli farzandi" by Muzaffar Qoraboyev
The best animation film	"Dovyurak oshpaz" by Nozim Tulakhujayev
The best computer graphics	"Elparvar" by Laziz Ganiyev
The best sound director	Anvar Fayzullayev for „Tinchlik ortida“
The best make-up artist	Valentina Abduqunduzova for „Islomxoʻja“
The best edit	Qudratilla Dadajonov for „Issiq non“
The best costume artist	Nina Dobrina for „Elparvar“
The best artist	Akmal Saidov for „Islomxoʻja“
The best composer	"Omnibus" ensemble for the films „Nazira“ and „Elparvar“
The best screenplay	Umid Hamdamov for „Issiq non“
The best cinematographer	Rustam Murodov for „Elparvar“
The best director	Rashid Malikov for „Sabot“
The best female actor	Muyassar Bediqulova for „Nazira“
The best male actor	Karim Mirkhodiyev for „Sabot“
The film that won the love of the audience	"Vasiyat" by Said Mukhtorov
The best film	"Issiq non" by Umid Hamdamov

== "Oltin humo" - 2021 ==
Oltin humo was broadly held in 2021. As presentation was postponed in 2020 because of the COVID-19 pandemic, 53 films of 2019-2020 (25 feature films, 21 documentaries and 7 animation) were submitted to the selection committee in 2021.

That year "Oltin humo" was held on December 22, 2021, at "House of Cinematographers" for the second time. Following specialists were members of the selection committee for that year:

- People's artist of Uzbekistan, Yoqub Ahmedov
- Cinematographer, Abdurahim Ismoilov
- First Deputy Chairman of the Cinematography Agency of the Republic of Uzbekistan, screenplay writer, Shukhrat Rizayev.
- Film director, Zulfiqor Musoqov
- People's artist of Uzbekistan, Chairman of the Academy of Arts of the Republic of Uzbekistan, Akmal Nur
- Rector of Journalism and Mass Communication University of Uzbekistan, Sherzod Qudratkhujayev
- Director-animator, Bekzod Salomov

Nomination	Nominee
Special "Oltin humo" award for the contributions to the Uzbek cinematography	
The best documentary	"Xalq Jasorati" by Ali Hamroyev
The best animation film	"Avtosarguzashtlar 4", by Abdulatif Haydarov
The best computer graphics	Dilshod Latifkhujayev for „Ibrat“
The best sound director	Anvar Fayzullayev for „Ilhaq“
The best make-up artist	Zilola Sobirova for „Ilhaq“
The best edit	Khurshid Alikhujayev for „Tengiz“
The best costume artist	Zukhra Ganiyeva for „Ilhaq“
The best artist	Isobek Egamberdiyev for „Qoʻqon Shamoli“
The best composer	Ubaydulla Karimov for „Colorless dreams“
The best screenplay	Umid Hamdamov for "Colorless dreams"
The best cinematographer	Jahongir Ibragimov for „Ilhaq“
The best director	Ayub Shahobiddinov for "Colorless dreams"
The best female actor	Dilorom Karimova for „Ilhaq“
The best male actor	Karim Mirkhodiyev, „Ibrat“
The film that won the love of the audience	"Qor yogʻmoqda, oppoq qor", by Rikhsivoy Muhammadjonov
The best film	"Ilhaq" by Jahongir Ahmedov
