= Boysun District =

Coordinates: 38.200°N 67.200°E

Boysun
- District
- Boysun tumani
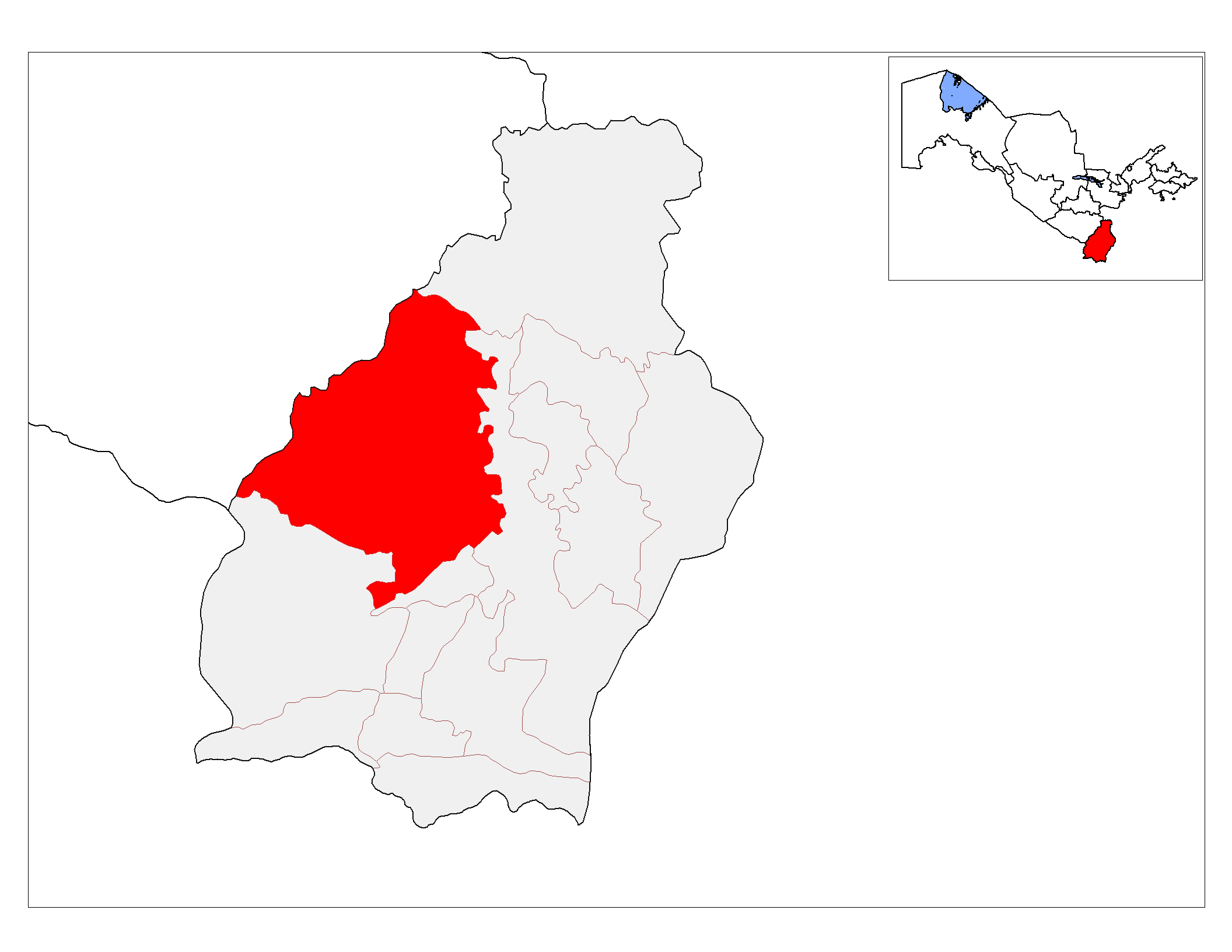
- Country: Uzbekistan
- Region: Surxondaryo Region
- Capital: Boysun
- Established: 1926

Area
  - Total: 3,546 km^{2} (1,369 sq mi)

Population (2021)
  - Total: 117,500
  - Density: 33.14/km^{2} (85.82/sq mi)
- Time zone: UTC+5 (UZT)

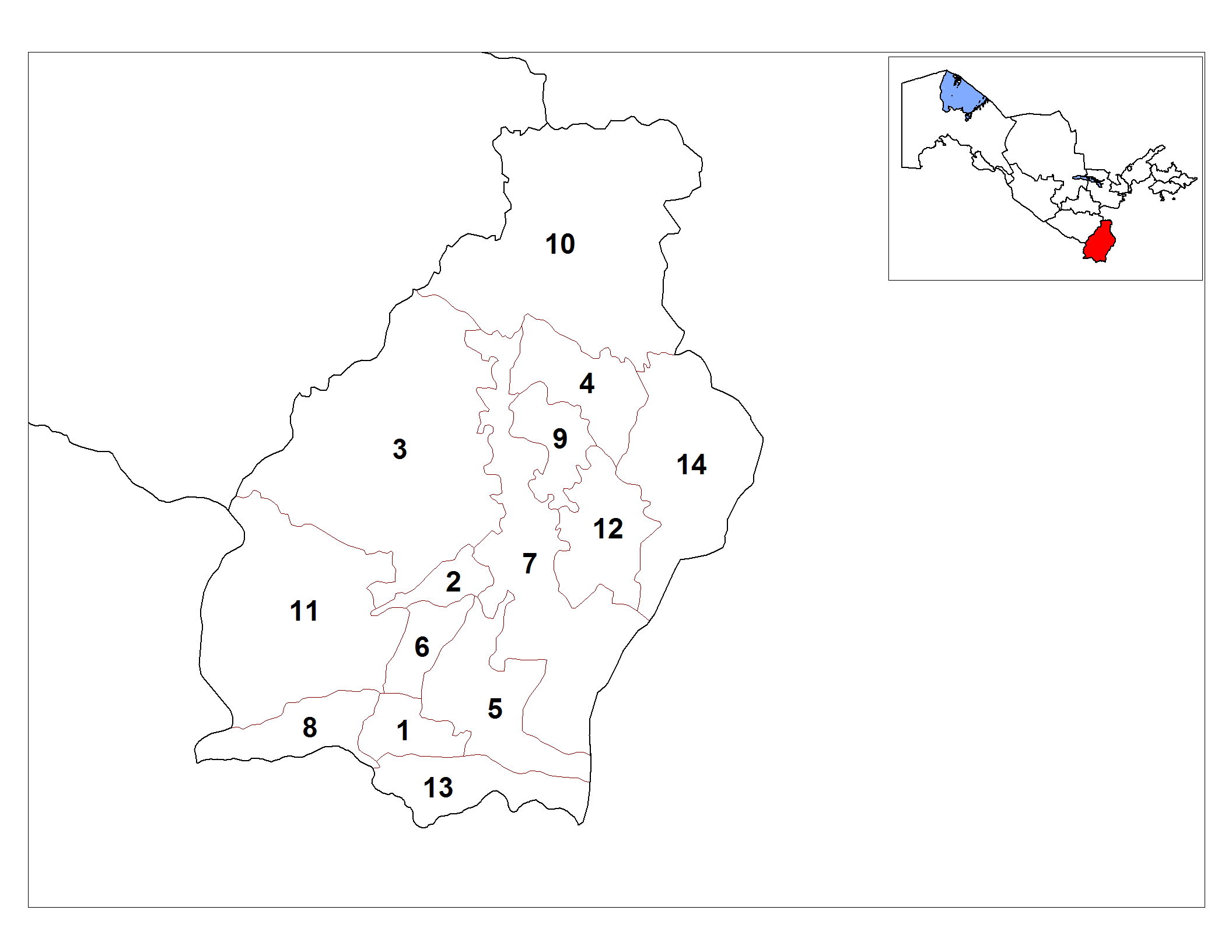
Boysun District is marked as 3.

Boysun district (Uzbek: Boysun tumani / Бойсун тумани) is a district in Surxondaryo Region, Uzbekistan. Its capital is the city of Boysun. It has an area of 3,546 km^{2} (1,369 sq mi) and its population is 117,500 (2021 est.). The district consists of one city (Boysun), 5 urban-type settlements (Kofrun, Tangimush, Pasurxi, Qoraboʻyin, Rabot) and 7 rural communities. In 2019 it lost part (174 km^{2} (67 sq mi)) of its territory to the re-established Bandixon District.

In 2001 the Boysun district was proclaimed as an intangible cultural heritage by UNESCO.
