= Kinoshock =

Film festival in Anapa, Russia

"Kinoshock" Open Film Festival of CIS and Baltic countries
- Location: Anapa, Russia
- Established: 1992
- Language: Russian
- Website: киношок.рф

"Kinoshock" Open Film Festival of CIS and Baltic countries, also spelt Kinoshok, is a film festival staged in the Black Sea resort of Anapa, Russia, each September. "CIS" refers to the Commonwealth of Independent States, comprising nine member states.

== History ==
Kinoshock film festival was established in 1992. In 1997, it changed its name from Kinoshock to "Kinoshock – Open CIS and Baltic Film Festival".

In 2014, the 23rd edition, the festival moved from the outskirts of Anapa to the city centre, and began opening all year round. Russian films screened in 2014 were Alexander Kott's film Test and Arseny Gonchukov 's Son.

== Governance and description ==
The Kinoshock Festival is an independent non-profit organisation. The film festival is held annually, supported and organised by the Government of the Russian Federation, the State Duma of the Federal Assembly of the Russian Federation, the Ministry of Culture of the Russian Federation, the Administration of the Krasnodar Territory, the Anapa city administration, the Union of Cinematographers of Russia, and the State Film Fund of Russia. It focuses on the films of the countries of the Commonwealth of Independent States CIS), along with Latvia, Lithuania and Estonia. CIS states are:

- Armenia
- Azerbaijan
- Belarus
- Kazakhstan
- Kyrgyzstan
- Moldova
- Russia
- Tajikistan
- Uzbekistan

In 2014, the president of the festival was the writer / director Viktor Merezhko (1937–2022).

The festival aims to support and showcase filmmakers of all genres of feature films, "whose work brings spirituality and aesthetic novelty; preservation of a single cinematic space, the revival of the national cultures of Russia and neighbouring states and cooperation between filmmakers from the CIS countries as well as the republics and regions of the Russian Federation", and to increase the popularity of each country's national cinema industry.

== By year ==
=== 2021 ===
In 2021, the festival took place from 25 September to 2 October. There were 12 feature films entered into competition, from Russia, Belarus, Kazakhstan, Uzbekistan, Kyrgyzstan, Tajikistan, Azerbaijan, Estonia, and Armenia. Two Krygz films were included in the feature film competition: The Lake, directed by Emil Atageldiev (Atageldijev), and The Road To Eden (Akyrky koch), directed by Bakyt Mukul and Dastan Zhapar Uulu.

=== 2022 ===
The 2022 edition of the festival runs from 25 September to 2 October.

In 2022, Elvin Adigozal's film Bilasuvar, which is about the residents of Bilasuvar in Azerbaijan, is scheduled to be screened at the festival.

== Competitions and award categories ==
All but the television film prize, which is voted on by audiences, are awarded by jury. Other events and retrospective programs are also held at the festival.

Films are screened in various competitions for:

- Feature films by the national film studios of each country
- Short feature films produced by the national studios
- Television film prize, "TV-Shock"
- Films for children and youth, "Kinomalyshok"
- Short film script

=== Awards ===
As of 2022 the following prizes are awarded:

- The "Golden Vine" main prize (Grand Prix), given to the producer of the best feature film
- Feature films:
  - Best director
  - Best screenplay
  - Alexander Knyazhinsky prize for best cinematography in a feature film
  - Best female role in a feature film
  - Best male role in a feature film
  - Best music for a feature film
- Special Grand Jury Diploma
- Short Film Competition Jury Prizes:
  - Best short film (given to the director)
  - Two special prizes
- "TV-Shock" - first, second and third prizes
- "Kinomalyshok", for children/youth films:
  - Best film
  - Best children's role (2 prizes)
- Special Prizes:
  - "Lady luck", in the name of Pavel Luspekaev, for courage and dignity in the profession
  - Best Producer of National Cinema
  - Other special prizes
- Best Screenplay Award, for shooting a short film based on the winning script with the participation of a professional film crew

== Selected events and winners ==
=== 2000 ===
Georgian tenor Zurab Sotkilava chaired the jury in 2000.

=== 2006 ===
- Kõrini! (Estonian-German, dir. Peeter Simm), best feature film, Grand Prix "Golden vine" award

=== 2008 ===
- Kristina Buožytė, best director, for The Collectress (Kolekcionierė)

=== 2011 ===
- Realtor (Rieltor) (Kazakhstan), dir. Adilkhan Yerzhanov, producer Serik Abishev, special jury prize

=== 2014 ===
- Corn Island, directed by Georgian director Giorgi Ovashvili, Grand Prix "Golden vine" award
