= Cinema of Uzbekistan =

The history of Uzbek cinema can be divided into two periods: the cinema of Soviet Uzbekistan (1924–1991) and the cinema of independent Uzbekistan (1991–present).

== History ==
A Cinematographic Department was created in 1920 in what was then the Turkestan Autonomous Soviet Socialist Republic, and in 1924 the first film studios were created in Bukhara as a cooperative enterprise between the Sevzapkino studio in Russia and the Commissariat of Enlightenment of the Bukharan People's Soviet Republic. Bukhkino, as a Russo-Bukharan cinematographic society, was also founded in 1924 and produced the first feature film in present-day Uzbekistan, The Minaret of Death by Viacheslav Viskovskii (1925), an exotic-themed film that was successful throughout the Soviet Union and was even exported abroad. Later, Bukhkino merged into Uzbekgoskino (Uzbekfilm) in Tashkent, which originally produced mostly Soviet anti-religious propaganda targeting Islam during the USSR anti-religious campaign (1928–1941).

Films of the Soviet period were shot either in Russian or Uzbek. The most critically acclaimed films of the Soviet period include films such as Maftuningman (1958), Mahallada duv-duv gap (1960), and Shum bola (1977).

Two prominent directors in the Soviet era were Nabi Ganiev (1904–1952) and Suleiman Khodjaev (1892–1937). While Ganiev, the first Uzbek director whose movies starred a majority of Uzbek actors (in previous films, most actors were Russian), engaged in Stalinist propaganda through his movies, and survived the purges, Khodjaev became a victim of Stalin's repression. His movie Before Dawn (1933) was ostensibly a criticism of Tsarist Russia, but depicting it as a colonial power, and the Uzbeks who opposed it as anti-colonial freedom fighters, made the authorities suspicious that Khodjaev was alluding to the Soviet Union. In 1937, The Oath by Aleksandr Ulos’stev-Garf was the first talking film produced in Uzebekistan. It also marked the end of an era as, during the Great Purge, very few new films were produced.

Uzbekfilm (Uzbek: O‘zbekfilm, Ўзбекфильм), established in 1925, is the largest and oldest film studio in Uzbekistan. Since 1966, Uzbekfilm has been releasing the republican satirical newsreel "Nashtar" ("Scalpel"), created by Samig Abdukakhkhar and Anatoly Kobulov (six issues per year). These short films were typically shown in cinemas before the main feature.

The Uzbekistan State Institute of Arts and Culture in Tashkent is the major film school.

Few Uzbek films after Uzbekistan became independent have achieved international notability. According to some Russian film critics around 2009, many of the modern Uzbek movies were cheap and of low quality. They suggested that while the quantity of Uzbek films is going up, the quality was not. However, there have been several critically acclaimed films in recent years, such as Scorpion (2018), Hot Bread (2019), and 2000 Songs of Farida (2020). I’m not a terrorist (2021), Sunday (2023).

With the appointment of Firdavs Abdukhalikov as general director of Uzbekkino in 2019, radical reforms in the cinematography of Uzbekistan were launched. In 2020, about 200 well-known filmmakers of the republic, including Ali Khamraev and Kamara Kamalova, published an open appeal in which they called on all representatives of the industry to unite in solving the problems of national cinema and support the ongoing reforms. In April 2021, President of Uzbekistan Shavkat Mirziyoyev actually launched the reforms by signing Decree “On measures to raise the cinematic arts and film industry to a qualitatively new level and further improve the system of state support for the industry”. According to the decree, the National Agency "Uzbekkino" was renamed the Cinematography Agency of Uzbekistan, the House of Cinema was reconstructed, and the annual Tashkent International Film Festival was established, which became the successor to the International Film Festival of Asia, Africa and Latin America and was held in Tashkent in the fall of 2021 year for the first time after a 24-year break. Was founded the Center for the Development of National Cinematography of Uzbekistan was created, which is responsible for the development of cinematography in the country and holding events in the country and abroad. Since 2023, the Center has been headed by Furkat Usmanov.

== Uzbekistani film directors ==
- Ali Hamroyev
- Ayub Shahobiddinov
- Elyor Ishmuhamedov
- Furkat Usmanov
- Georgi Yungvald-Khilkevich
- Jaxongir Ahmedov
- Kamara Kamalova
- Melis Abzalov
- Muhammad Ali Iskandarov
- Rustam Sagdiyev
- Shokir Kholikov
- Shuhrat Abbosov
- Yalkin Tuychiev
- Yoʻldosh Aʼzamov

== Uzbekistan film actors ==
Uzbekistani actors and actresses include:

- Adiz Radjabov
- Azamat Axrorov
- Aziz Rametov
- Radjabova Azisa
- Aleksandr Abdulov
- Akmal Nazarov
- Asal Shodiyeva
- Aysanem Yusupova
- Baxtiyor Ixtiyorov
- Bekzod Tadjiyev
- Botir Khusanbaev
- D.Ditto
- Melis Abzalov
- Shuhrat Abbosov
- Shukur Burkhanov
- Shoxrux Abduxalilov
- Sitora Farmonova
- Ali Hamroyev
- Ergash Karimov
- Dilnoza Kubayeva
- Tohir Sodiqov
- Alisher Uzoqov
- Jamshid Zokirov
- Umid Iskandarov
- Ulugʻbek Qodirov
- Diyor Mahkamov
- Farhad Mahmudov
- Hoshim Arslonov
- Fatxulla Mansudov
- Yodgor Sadiyev
- Yoqub Ahmediv
- Yefim Bronfman
- Rihsitilla Abdullaev
- Lufilla Sadullayeva
- Gulchexra Sadullayeva
- Murod Radjabov
- Mo'min Rizo
- Muhammad Ali Iskandarov
- Nodirbek Primqulov
- Guchehra Eshonqulova
- Umid Zokirov

== List of Uzbekistan films ==
The following are selected critically acclaimed Uzbek films:

- Maftuningman (1958)
- Yor-yor (1964)
- Mahallada duv-duv gap (1960)
- Shum Bola (1977)
- Toʻylar muborak (1978)
- Suyunchi (1982)
- Kelinlar qoʻzgʻoloni (1984)
- Armon (1986)
- Abdullajon (1991)
- Sarvinoz (2004)
- Foyima va Zuxra (2005)
- Telba (2008)
- Yondiradi Kuydiradi (2011)
- Baron (2016)
- Virus (2016)
- Scorpion (2018)
- Islomxoʻja (2018)
- Hot Bread (2019)
- 2000 Songs of Farida (2020)
- Ilhaq — (2020)
- I’m not a terrorist (rus. Я - не террорист). (2021)
- Fragrant melons of Samarkand
- Ael Kismati (The Fate of a Woman)
- 101 Flight
- Fara Tashkentskiy (2021)
- Inson (2021)
- Call Sign "Baron" (2022)
- Meni Sev (2021)
- Oʻzbek qizi (2022)
- Sunday (2022)
- Abdulla Aripov (2023)
- Kazbek (film) (2023)
- Uch Qahramon (film 2023)

== See also ==
- Cinema of Central Asia
- Cinema of the Soviet Union
- Cinema of the world
- List of Uzbekistani submissions for the Academy Award for Best International Feature Film
