= Moʻmin Rizo =

Uzbek actor

Moʻmin Rizo Mumin Rizo Мумин Ризо
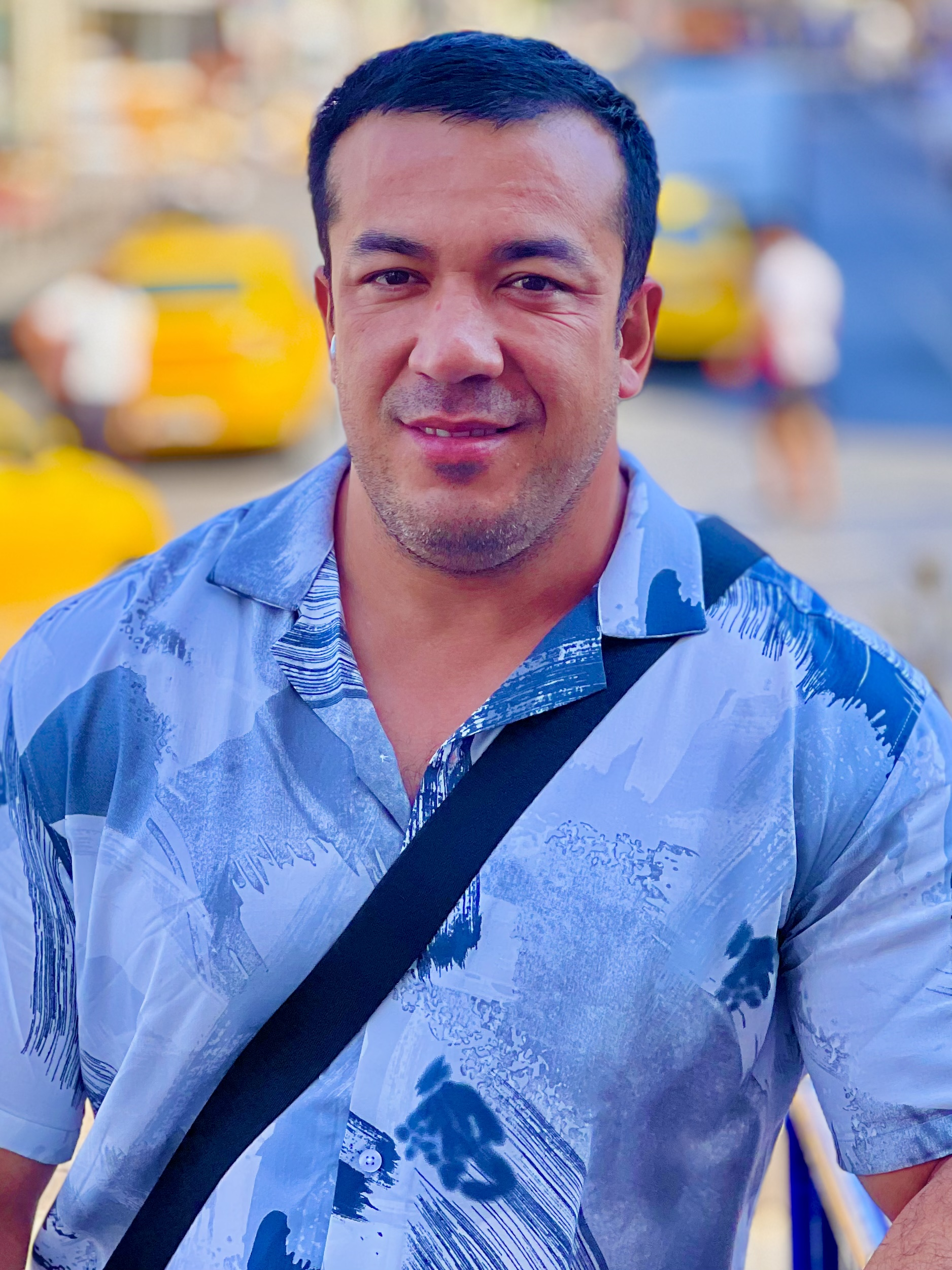
- Born: Möminjon Qöchqorov; November 5, 1983 (age 41); Fargana, Uzbek SSR, USSR
- Occupation: Actor
- Years active: 2005–present
- Children: 3
- Awards: Honored artist of Uzbekistan: 2006 - Laureate of the XXVIII award "Choice of Favorite Actor" in the local nomination "Favorite Uzbek Actor" of the NTT TV channel of Uzbekistan.; 2007 - winner of the non-commercial award of the national cinema of Uzbekistan "M & tv" "The best Uzbek negative character of the year" - for the role of Ulugbek in the series "Spring Months" (2008).; 2017 - for playing the role of Nodyr in the television series Asira.; 2018 - nomination "Best Actor of the Battle of Hearts / Series" for the professional prize of the Association of Film and Television Producers in the field of television cinema.; 2019 - Golden Ribbon! Laureate of the national television award. In the special nomination "Bakht Kushi".

Moʻminjon Qoʻchqorov (born 5 November 1983), most commonly known by his stage name Moʻmin Rizo, is an Uzbek actor. The singer was awarded "Doʻstlik" in 2011, and "Honored Artist of Uzbekistan" in 2017.

Moʻmin Rizo has achieved great success in acting. Moʻmin Rizo received wide recognition in Uzbekistan after his role in the 2005 Uzbek drama Super Team. Since then, he has acted in many Uzbek films. In particular, the films “Super Kamanda” and “Bahor oylarida”, which were released on the big screens in 2017, brought great fame to the actor.

== Life and career ==
Moʻmin Rizo was born on November 5, 1983, in the Ferganá region, into a family of intellectuals. After graduating from high school, Moʻmin Rizo studied at the Kyrgyz-Uzbek International University Faculty of Law and Customs in 2001–2006.

He started his acting career in 2005 with his role in the movie “Super Kamanda”. Although this film was Moʻmin Rizo's first role, it received good ratings. The movie "Super Kamanda" tells the story of an ugly boy whose father abandoned him. After that, he starred in several movies. In 2019 he starred in the film "Egizak oshiqlar", produced by Ruslan Mirzayev. The film was shot in Istanbul, Turkey, and Moʻmin Rizo played one of the leading roles in the film. She then played the lead role in the series "Ishq o'yinlari" (Love Games), shot by Turkish and Uzbek filmmakers from 2020 to 2021. In 2020, he starred in the film "Khuda Haafiz" co-produced by India and Uzbekistan. Then he played the main role in the series "Yur Muhabbat" (Come on love), shot by Turkish and Uzbek filmmakers from 2022.

== Personal life ==
Moʻmin Rizo is married and has 5 children, that is, 4 daughters and a son. His wife Ziyoda Normuradova is also an actress.

== Filmography ==
The following is a chronologically ordered list of films that Moʻmin Rizo has starred in.

| Year | Title | Role | Ref |
|---|---|---|---|
| 2006 | Super Kamanda | Xasan | |
| 2007 | Bahor oylarida | Ulugbek | |
| 2017 | Zuhroxonni sinfi | Fizika o'xtuchisi | |
| 2017 | Menga qorbobo kerak | Marat | |
| 2018 | Egizak oshiqlar | Xasan | |
| 2018 | Dilozorom | | |
| 2018 | Merosxór | | |
| 2018 | Ota Rozi | Oxrana | |
| 2018 | Dilozorim | | |
| 2019 | Sniper | Teraris | |
| 2019 | Qotillar óyni | Killer | |
| 2020 | Khuda Haafiz | I.K Mishra assistant | |
| 2021 | Sevgim, sevgilim | Shuxrat | |

=== TV serials ===
| Year | Title | Role | Ref |
|---|---|---|---|
| 2017 | Asira | Nodir | |
| 2018 | Yuraklar jangi | | |
| 2019 | Baht qushi | Azim | |
| 2019 | Rizo | Rizo | |
| 2020 | Bokira | Xamid | |
| 2020 | Ishq o’yinlari | Bobur | |
| 2022 | Yur Muhabbat | Bakir | |

== Awards and nominations ==
| Year | Reward | Category | Movie | Result |
|---|---|---|---|---|
| 2006 | M & TVA Awards | Best Supporting Actor - Uzbekistan | Super Kamanda | Won |
| 2007 | Film awards | Best Actor - Uzbekistan | Bahor oylarida | Nominated |
| 2017 | Sevimli Awards | Best Actor - Uzbekistan | Asira | Nominated |
| 2017 | M Awards | Best Actor - Uzbekistan | Asira | Nominated |
| 2018 | MY5 Awards | Best Actor - Uzbekistan | Yuraklar jangi | Won |
| 2018 | Film awards | Best Actor in a Negative Role | Yuraklar jangi | Nominated |
| 2018 | M & TVA | Best Actor - Uzbekistan | Yuraklar jangi | Won |
| 2018 | RizaNova Awards | Performance in the main role - Uzbekistan | Yuraklar jangi | Won |
| 2018 | Golden globe | Best Actor - Uzbekistan | Baxt Qushi | Nominated |
| 2018 | Sevimli Awards | Best Actor - Uzbekistan | Baxt Qushi | Nominated |
| 2018 | RizaNova Awards | Best negative actor in 10 years | None | Won |
| 2019 | M Awards | Best Performance in a Leading Role - Uzbekistan | Baxt Qushi | Nominated |
| 2019 | Oltin humo | Best Actor in a Negative Role | Baxt Qushi | Nominated |
| 2019 | GQ Awards | Best Actor - Uzbekistan | | Nominated |
| 2020 | RizaNova Awards | Best Actor - Uzbekistan | Ishq o’yinlari | Won |
| 2020 | Sevimli Awards | Best Actor - Uzbekistan | Ishq o’yinlari | Won |
| 2020 | GQ Awards | Best Actor - Uzbekistan | Ishq o’yinlari | Won |

- 2006 - Laureate of the XXVIII award "Choice of Favorite Actor" in the local nomination "Favorite Uzbek Actor" of the NTT TV channel of Uzbekistan.
- 2007 - winner of the non-commercial award of the national cinema of Uzbekistan "M & tv" "The best Uzbek negative character of the year" - for the role of Ulugbek in the series "Spring Months" (2008).
- 2017 - for playing the role of Nodyr in the television series Asira.
- 2018 - nomination "Best Actor of the Battle of Hearts / Series" for the professional prize of the Association of Film and Television Producers in the field of television cinema.
- 2019 - Golden Ribbon! Laureate of the national television award. In the special nomination "Bakht Kushi".
