= Shahrukh Murtazaev =

Uzbek producer

Shahrukh Murtazaev Russian: Шахрух Муртазаев
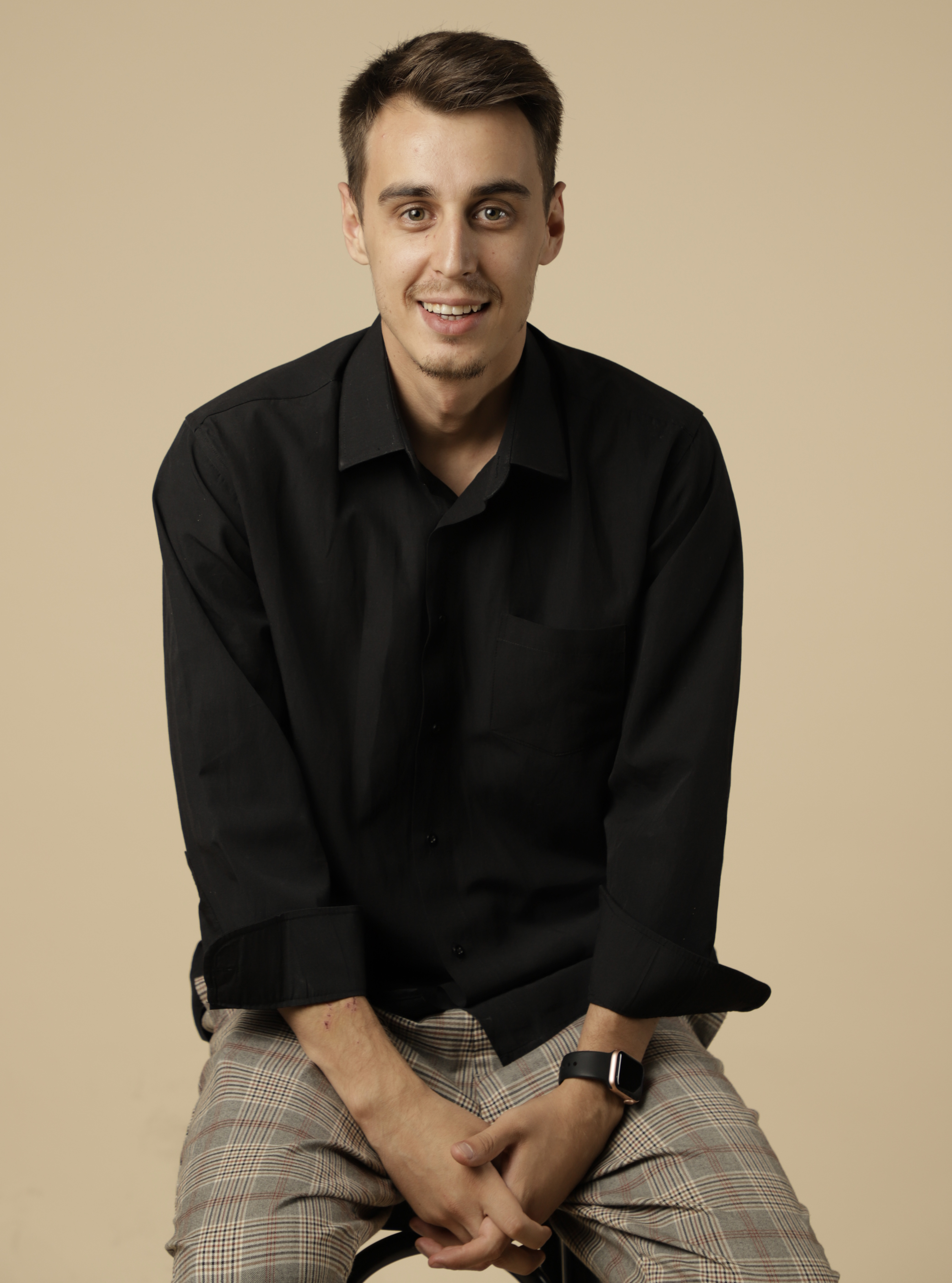
- Born: Shahrukh Murtazaev; June 25, 1994 (age 32); Urganch, Uzbekistan
- Citizenship: Uzbekistan
- Education: Uzbekistan State Institute of Arts and Culture
- Occupation: producer
- Years active: 2010–present
- Spouse: Aziza Murtazaev
- Children: Davud Davronbekov (son)
- Awards: Shuhrat

Shahrukh Murtazaev (Uzbek: Shoxrux Murtazayev, Шахрух Муртазаев) (born June 25, 1994) is an Uzbek producer who has worked in film, theater and television. He has received numerous awards including two RizaNova Awards, two Gold Key Awards, as well as nominations for three Oltin Kabutar Awards.

== Life ==
Shakhrukh Davronbekovich Murtazaev was born on June 25, 1994, in Khorezm in a farming family, and in 2010-2013 he studied at a vocational college in Urganch. After graduating from college, he entered the Tashkent State Institute of Art and Culture.

== Personal life ==
Shokhrukh married Aziza Murtazaev in 2019, and now Shokhrukh has a child, Davud Davronbekov.

== Career ==
In 2007, Shahrukh's childhood dream came true when he was in college. Is this his teacher and mentor Djahongir Poziljonov was familiar with. He joins a group called “West” of the college. As a result of many years of work in the Shokhrukh group, he learned to work at a professional level. In 2013, he entered the Institute of Arts and Culture. In 2015, Shokhrukh produced several shows and many projects on the Milliy TV channel.

=== Professional career ===
During his career at Milliy TV he presented the project "7 - Studio" and this project was very successful and Shahrukh promoted many seasons of it. This project was nominated for the "Qoltin Kalit" award as "Best Show". After several years of successful work on the TV channel, Shokhrukh was invited to the "Salom social media" project as a chief producer. As a result, more than 10 series were created in "Salom social media" under the leadership of Shakhrukh. Among them, the series "Maktab" has become very popular among the youth. In 2021, Kazakhistanlok together with the creators produced the series "Fara Tashkentsky" based on the events of the 90s.Javahir Zakirov invited him to the main character in the series "Fara Tashkentsky" This proposal of Shahrukh brought great success to the series. The TV series "Fara Tashekntisky" won many awards and nominations. In 2022, Shakhrukh launched the TV series "Hello Oijon" and this series was also well received by the Uzbek audience. Another TV series "Meni Sev" was released this year and this series was very popular in Uzbekistan. It brought Shokhrukh great success and received several nominations and awards. Also, the TV series "Oliftaxon", "Surduc", "Maktab 2", "Tashkent 94" occupied a deep place in the hearts of the public.

== Filmography ==
Below is a chronologically ordered list of films in which Shahrukh Murtazaev has appeared.

Year	Title	Original title	Role	Source
2015	7- Studio	7 - Studio	Producer, Director, Writer	
2017	Gold Key	Qoltin Kalit	Producer, Director, Writer	
2018	Oliftakhon	Oliftaxon	Producer	
2019	Billionaire from Istanbul	Istanbullik Milliarder	Producer	
2020	We drove	Surdik	Producer	
2021	School	Maktab	Producer	
2021	Fara Tashkentsky	Fara Tashkentsky	Producer	
2022	Give me Love	Meni Sev	Producer	
2022	Hello mom	Hello Oijon	Producer	
2023	Tashkent 94	Toshkent 94	Producer	
2023	School 2	Maktab 2	Producer	
2023		Salom Uka		
2024		Admin		
2025	Pilaf in the Ambush	Pistirmadagi Osh		
2025	Article 97	97 modda		
2025	Istanbul is to blame for everything.	Hammasiga Istanbul aybdor		
2025	OUT	OUT		
2026	Housewives	Bekalar		

== Awards and nominations ==
- In 2026, they were awarded the "Shuhrat" (Glory) Medal, a state award.

Year	Reward	Category	Movie	Result	Source
2015	Oltin Kabutar	A good TV show producer	7 - Studio	Won	
2015	Premiile M TV	Best Show Producer of the Year	7 - Studio	Won	
2017	Premiile M TV	Best Show Producer of the Year	Oltin kalit	Won	
2018	RizaNova Awards	The best family drama of the year	Oliftaxon	Nominated	
2021	RizaNova Awards	The best crime series of the year	Fara Tashkentsky	Won	
2021	RizaNova Awards	Cel mai bun producător de film al anului	Fara Tashkentsky	Won	
2021	Gold Key Award	Cel mai bun producător de film al anului	Fara Tashkentsky	Nominated	
2021	Film awards	Cel mai bun producător de film al anului	Maktab	Nominated	
2021	Gold Key Award	Cel mai bun producător de film al anului	Maktab	Won	
2021	Film awards	Cel mai bun producător de film al anului	Surdik	Nominated	
2022	Film awards	Cel mai bun producător de film al anului	Hello Oyijon	Won	
2022	RizaNova Awards	Cel mai bun producător de film al anului	Meni Sev	Won	
2022	Gold Key Award	Cel mai bun producător de film al anului	Meni Sev	Won	
