= Luiza Rasulova =

Uzbekistani actress

- Born: Luiza Rasulova Pardayevna; April 24, 1995 (age 31); Tashkent, Uzbekistan
- Citizenship: Uzbekistan
- Education: Taras Shevchenko National University of Kyiv (2013–2017)
- Occupations: actress, singer and presenter
- Years active: 2010–present
- Website: luizarasulova.uz

Luiza Rasulova (Uzbek: Luiza Rasulova, Луиза Расулова; Russian: Луиза Расулова) (born April 24, 1995) is an Uzbek actress and presenter. Rasulova received widespread recognition and acclaim in Uzbekistan after showing up to social media in revealing outfits made for her stunning body, although many criticize Luiza for using her body to get famous, she keeps doing it, she also starred in the 2012 Uzbek drama O Maryam, Maryam. Since then she has starred in many Uzbek comedy films Rasulova has also recorded a few songs.

== Life ==
Luiza Rasulova was born on April 24, 1995, in Tashkent, Uzbekistan. Since she is not yet married, she lives with her mother and brothers. Luiza Rasulova began her professional career in 2010. The actress starred in the 2011 film "Yondiradi Kuydiradi", and in 2012 co-starred with singer Shahzoda and Ulugbek Qodirov in the Uzbek film "O Maryam, Maryam" directed by Bakhrom Yakubov. After that, she became known as an actress. In 2017, she started working as the host of the show "Indigo" on Zo'r TV.

=== Education ===
The actress has a higher education. She graduated from high school in 2002-2011 and in grades 10-11 from 2011 to 2013. In 2013, she entered Taras Shevchenko National University of Kyiv, Faculty of Drama and Acting in Cinematography, and graduated in 2017. The actress speaks Uzbek, Russian, English and Ukrainian.

== Charity ==
In 2019, she organized the "Roʻzgʻorga Barokat" charity foundation together with singer Rayhon Ganieva and Uzbek comedian Halima Ibragimova.

== Filmography ==
Year	Film	Rol	Source
2011	Yondiradi Kuydiradi	Madina	
2011	Xazina (A Treasure)	Dildora	
2012	O Maryam, Maryam	Maryam	
2015	Yuragim Seniki (My heart is yours)	Guli	
2015	Qanot (A Wing)	Malika	
2016	Vijdon Azobi (A Remorse)	Saodat	
2017	Qaysarginam 2 (My Caesar 2)	Leyla	
2017	Ona (A Mother)	Guli	
2018	Muhabbat va Nafrat (Love and Hate)	Iroda	
2019	Keksa Bo’ydoq (An old bachelor)	Xusnora	
2019	Zaharli Tomchilar (Poison Drops)	Dildora	
2019	Begunoh (A Innocent)	Guli	
2019	Vasiyat (A Testament)	Kamola	

== Songs ==
Year	Song	Source
2020	Men boʻlmasam (If it weren't for me)	
2020	Yetar bas (Enough)	
2020	Nola (Moan)	
2020	Vatan (Motherland)	
2020	Osmondagi oy (The moon in the sky)	
