= Umid Irgashev =

Uzbek actor

- Born: March 2, 1987 (age 38); Tashkent, Uzbek SSR, USSR
- Occupation: Actor
- Years active: 2009–present
- Children: 3

Umid Irgashev (uzb: Umid Ergashev, ру: Умид Эргашев, born 2 March 1987 in Tashkent, Uzbekistan) is an Uzbek television and cinema actor and founder of fast-food chain Feed Up He started his professional career as an actor in 2009. Irgashev made his first movie with "Oqpadar" in 2012 and has starred in many movies since then.

== Life and career ==
Umid Irgashev was born on March 2, 1987, in the city of Tashkent. His father worked as a manager in a furniture factory. His mother first worked as a nurse, and then as an economist in a bank. The actor got married in 2009. He has 3 children. He started his acting career in 2009 with his role in the movie "Oqpadar". Although this movie was Umid's first role, it received good ratings. The movie "Oqpadar" tells the story of an ugly boy whose father abandoned him. After that, he starred in several movies. In 2019, he starred in the movie "Istanbullik Milliarder", produced by Ruslan Mirzayev. The film was shot in Istanbul, Turkey, and Umid played one of the lead roles in the film. He then played the lead role in the series "Ishq o'yinlari" (Games of Love), shot by Turkish and Uzbek filmmakers from 2020 to 2021. In addition to acting, Umid Irgashev is also involved in business.

== Filmography ==
Year	Title	Role	Ref
2012	Oqpadar		
2014	Tungi mehmon		
2015	Xiyonat girdobi		
2015	Koʻz yoshim		
2016	Ikki telba		
2017	Sevadi sevmaydi		
2019	Istanbullik milliarder	Aziz	

=== Series ===
Year	Title	Ref
2020	Yuraklar jangi	
2020-2021	Ishq oʻyinlari	
