= Galiya Izmaylova =

Uzbek and Soviet ballerina and choreographer

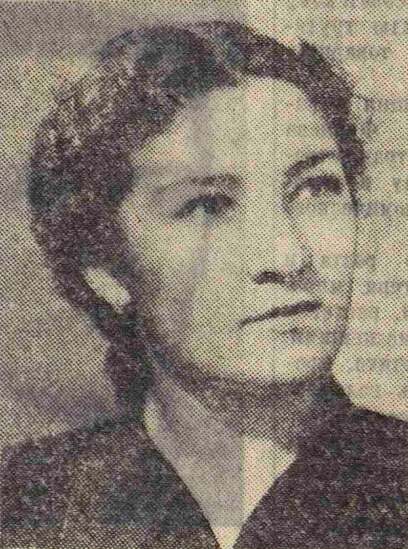
- Born: Galiya Bayazit gizi Izmaylova; 12 February 1923; Tomsk, USSR
- Died: 2 October 2010 (aged 87); Tashkent, Uzbekistan
- Occupations: ballet dancer, choreographer
- Awards: USSR State prize (1950), People’s Artist of Uzbek SSR (1951), The Order of Lenin (twice), Shukhrat Medal (1997), Order of Dustlik (1998), Order of Mehrat Shukhrati (2003).

Galiya Bayazit gizi Izmaylova (Tatar: Галия Баязит кызы Измайлова, romanized: Ğaliä Bayazit qızı İzmaylova 12 February 1923 – 2 October 2010) was an Uzbek and Soviet ballerina of Tatar origin, ballet master, choreographer, teacher, People's Artist of the USSR (1962), and laureate of the Stalin Prize II degree (1950).

== Early life and education ==
Galiya Izmaylova was born on 12 February 1923 in Tomsk into a Tatar family. Izmaylova's father was repressed when she was nine years old. She left Tomsk with her mother after her father's death and from 1931 lived in Tashkent.

Izmaylova began her dance career at the age of 11, and soon she was invited to the newly opened ballet school. In 1935, Izmaylova entered the Uzbek Republican Ballet School. In 1941, she was in the first graduation of the students of the ballet school. After graduation she entered the troupe of the Uzbek Opera and Ballet Theater in Tashkent. Izmaylova was the leading prima ballerina, performing leading roles in the theater troupe.

== Career ==
In 1943, Izmaylova danced her first part – the main role of Semung in the Ak-Bilyak ballet. In 1944, she received the first recognition of the audience as a performer of Fergana and Tajik dances, performing at the concerts of the Second Decade of the musical art of Central Asia Republics (Tashkent).

In 1947, at the World Festival of Youth and Students in Prague, Izmaylova received the first prize for the performance of the Uzbek (Bukhara) dance called "Zang".

In 1958, she graduated from the directing department of the Tashkent State Institute of Culture.

Izmaylova toured abroad (China, Romania, France, Great Britain, India, USA, etc.) as a performer of Uzbek folk dances, as well as Chinese, Arab, Indian, etc. Among the roles of Izmaylova are: Maria and Zarema (The Fountain of Bakhchisarai by Boris Asafiev, 1945, 1961), Gulnara (The Ballerina by Georgi Mushel, 1949), Kitri (Don Quixote by Ludwig Minkus, 1948, 1960, 1970), Tao Hoa (The Red poppy by Reinhold Glier, 1949), Giselle (Giselle by Adolphe Adam, 1957), Carmen (Bolero by Maurice Ravel, 1960), Nargiz (The Kashmir Legend by Georgi Mushel, 1961), Juanita (Don Juan by Leonid Feigin, 1964), Aegina (Spartacus by Aram Khachaturian, 1967), Gulaim (Forty Girls by Leonid Feigin, 1967), Chundari (Amulet of Love by Mukhtar Ashrafi, 1969), etc. In total she had 45 roles, 30 performances she staged as a choreographer.

From 1963 to 1970, she was a deputy of the Supreme Soviet of the Uzbek SSR.

Since 1977, Izmaylova was the chief choreographer of the Uzbek Opera and Ballet Theater named after I. Navoi in Tashkent.

Galiya Izmaylova died on 2 October 2010 in Tashkent. She was buried at the Chigatay cemetery.

== Awards and honors ==
=== Soviet awards ===
- People's Artist of Uzbek SSR (1952)
- People's Artist of the USSR (1962)
- State Hamza Prize (1970)
- Stalin prize 2nd class (1950)
- Honored Artist of the Uzbek SSR (1950)
- Two Order of Lenin (6 December 1951 and 18 March 1959)
- Order of the Badge of Honor

=== Uzbek awards ===
- Medal of Labor Glory (1997)
- Order of Friendship (1998)
- Order of Labor Glory (2003)

=== Other honors ===
In 2012, a film "Galiya Izmaylova. Dance at the cost of life" was released.
