= Yoqub Ahmedov =

Uzbek theatre and film actor (1938–2025)

- Ёқуб Ахмедов
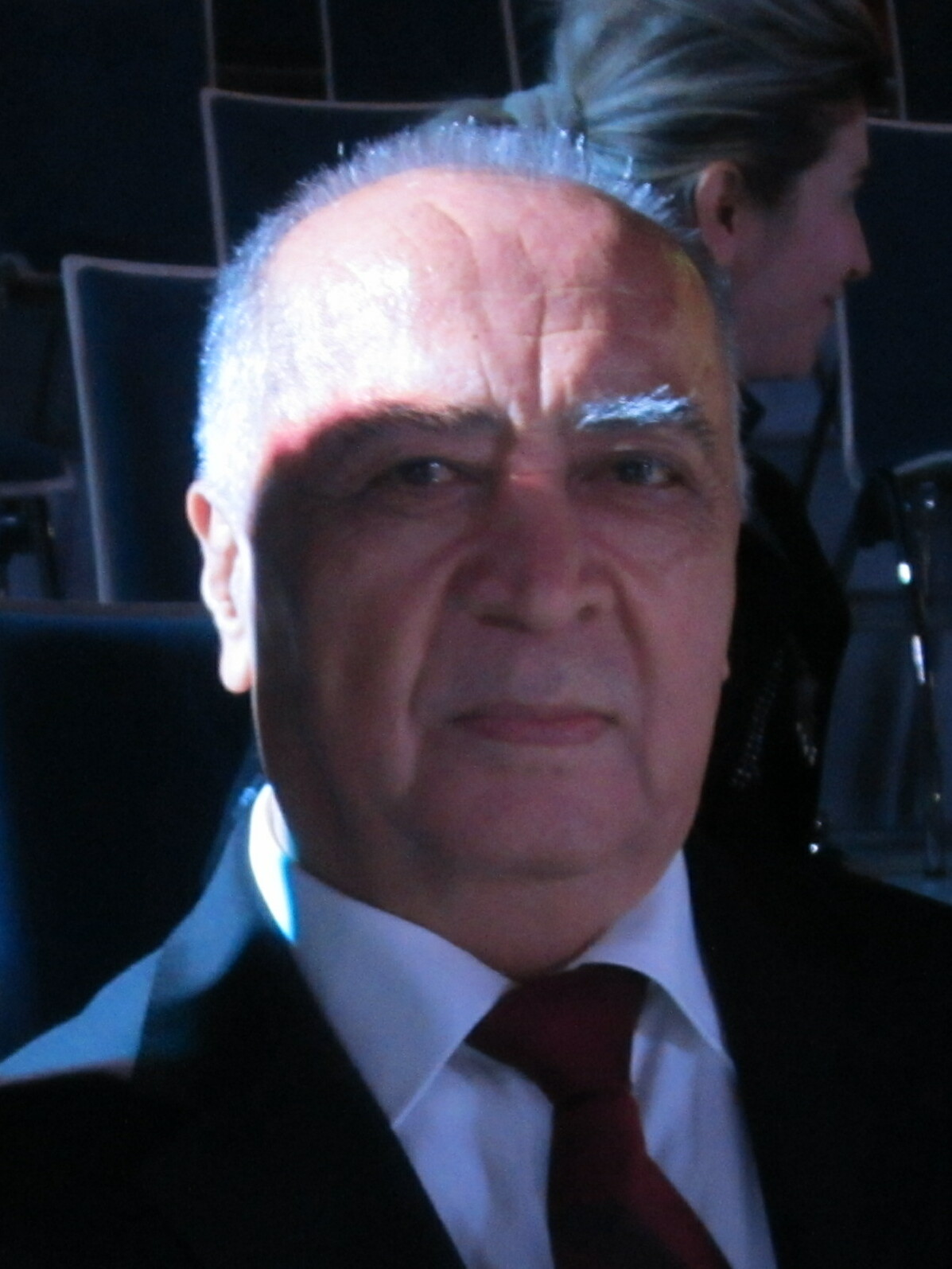
- Ahmedov in 2012
- Born: 3 January 1938; Namangan, Uzbek SSR, Soviet Union
- Died: 30 October 2025 (aged 87); Tashkent, Uzbekistan
- Education: Tashkent Institute of Arts
- Occupation: Actor
- Awards: People's Artist of the USSR (1991)

Yoqub Ahmedov (Note: Uzbek: Yoqub Ahmedov, Ёқуб Ахмедов) (3 January 1938 – 30 October 2025) was an Uzbek theatre and film actor. He was named People's Artist of the USSR in 1991 and People's Artist of Uzbekistan. He was awarded the USSR state prize in 1977.

== Early life and education ==
Ahmedov was born in Namangan on 3 January 1938, and took a degree at Tashkent Institute of Arts 1959.

== Personal life and death ==
His daughter Nadira Abdullayeva is an actress. His son-in-law Rihsitilla Abdullaev is also a film and theatre actor.

Ahmedov died on 30 October 2025, at the age of 87.

== Filmography ==
- 1958 Maftuningman
- 1969 Oʻtgan kunlar
- 1977 The Mischievous Boy
- 1980 Adventures of Ali-Baba and the Forty Thieves
- 1989 Coins
- 1990 The Battle of the Three Kings
- 1991 Au! Ograblenie train
- 1997 Oʻtgan kunlar
- 2003 Destiny
- 2004 The wave of Hearts as Yuldashev
- 2009 Revenge
- 2010 Threatened
- 2014 Come and see
- 2014 Owner
- 2015 The Baron
- 2016 Baron 2
- 2015-2018 Hotel
