= Yur Muhabbat =

- Written by: Ilyos Qosimov
- Directed by: Shuhrat Salomov
- Starring: Ulugʻbek Qodirov; Sitora Alimjanova; Gavhar Zokirova; Shuxrat Umarov; Aziza Halilova; Khamid Nizamov; Mo'min Rizo; Bahshillo Fatullayev
- Composer: Farruh Sobirov
- Country of origin: Uzbekistan
- Original language: Uzbek
- No. of seasons: 1
- No. of episodes: 50

Production
- Producer: Ruslan Mirzayev
- Production locations: Uzbekistan, Turkey
- Cinematography: Umid Malikov
- Running time: 35–40 minutes (Sevimli TV)
- Production company: Star fox

Original release
- Network: Sevimli TV
- Release: 20 July 2022 – present

Yur Muhabbat - Walk Love is an Uzbek television drama that aired on Sevimli TV.

The series, produced by Ruslan Mirzayev, was shot in collaboration with Uzbek and Turkish filmmakers in three countries: Uzbekistan, Turkey and the United States. The main roles in the film were played by Uzbek actors Ulugʻbek Qodirov, Sitora Alimjonova, Gavhar Zokirova and Khamid Nizamov - the brightest examples of Uzbek cinema. Momin Rizo, Bahshillo Fatullayev and Karen Gafurjanov played a supporting role in this film.

== Plot ==
Umar and Zainab, who loved each other very much, got divorced because of Umar's father. Years later, when Umar was about to marry another girl, Zainab came to him as the wife of a new employee, Umar Murad, and they began to work together. How much love from the past affects their fate.

== Creation ==
The series Yur Muhabbat started in 2018 and was stopped for some reason.

== Cast ==
- Ulugʻbek Qodirov as Umar
- Sitora Alimjonova as Zaynab
- Gavhar Zokirova as Rano
- Shuxrat Umarov as Ibrohim
- Aziza Halilova as Sevinch
- Khamid Nizamov as Hamza
- Mirshod Atavullayev as Komron
- Mo'min Rizo as Bakir
- Bahshillo Fatullayev as ?
- Temur Muxammadxojayev as Ali
- Azim Yuldashev as ?
- Muyassar Berdiqulova as ?
- Ganisher Raxmatullayev as ?

== Film crew ==
- Producers — Ruslan Mirzayev
- Director — Shuhrat Salomov
- Script writers — Ozan Ayaz and Oğuz Ayaz
- Director of photography — Umid Malikov
- Production designer — Azizbek Najimov
- Composer — Farruh Sobirov
- Costume Designers — Sanobar Anvarova
- Makeup artist — Galina Geydelbax
- Casting director — Zilola Raxmonberdiyeva
- Editing directors — Hojakbar Nurmuxamdedov

== Sound post-production ==
=== Soundtrack ===
Yur Muhabbat

Soundtrack album by Farruh Sobirov
- Released: 10 January 2022
- Recorded: 2022
- Genre: Film soundtrack
- Length: 4:15
- Language: Uzbek
- Label: RizaNova
- Producer: Ruslan Mirzayev

Farruh Sobirov chronology
Farruh Sobirov (2022)	Yur Muhabbat (2022)	Farruh Sobirov (2022)

Farruh Sobirov was roped in to compose the original soundtrack and score for Yur Muhabbat.
