= Bahshillo Fatullayev =

Uzbek actor

Bahshillo Fatullayev Бахшулло Фатуллаев
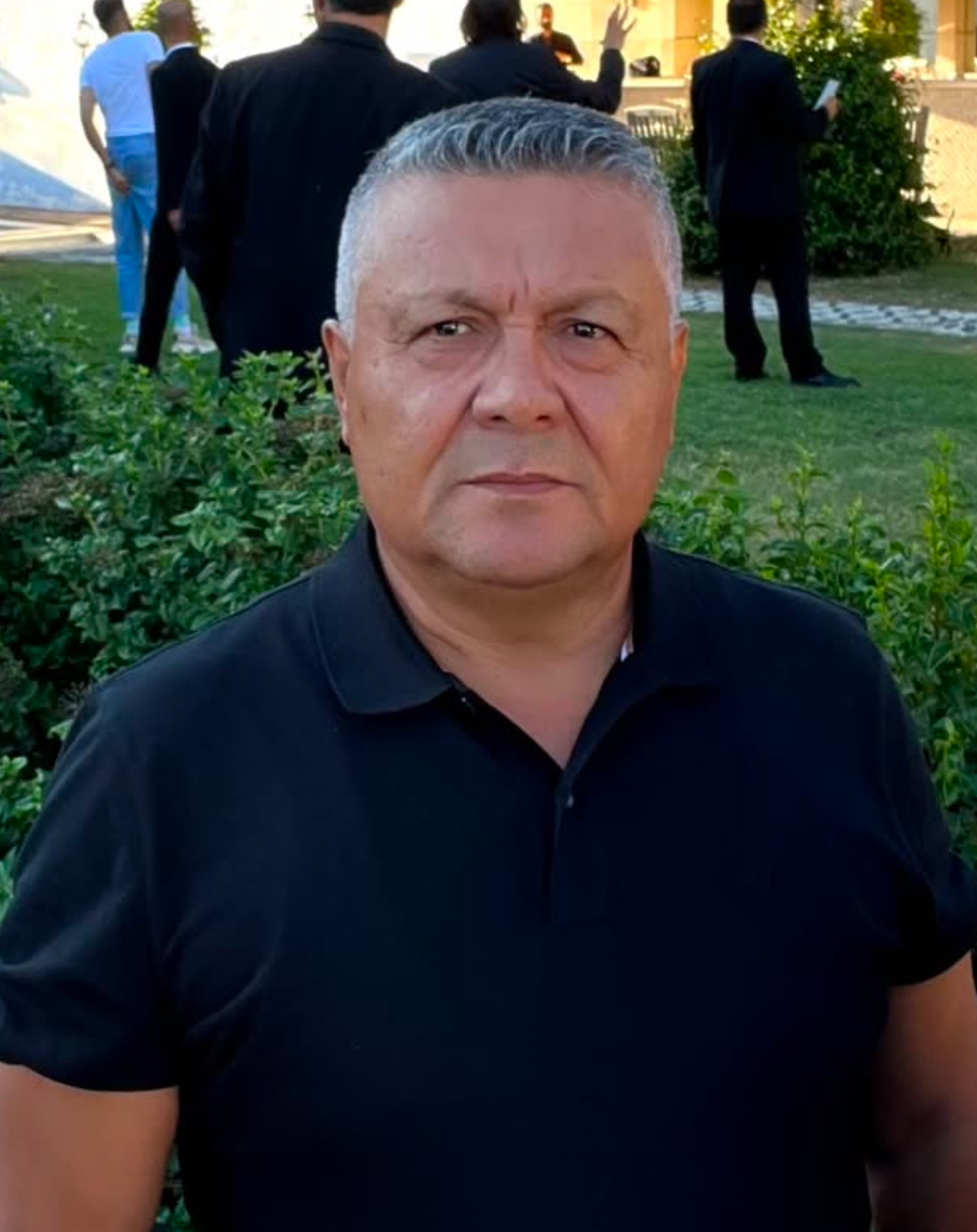
- Born: Fatullayev Bahshillo Ismatovich; September 15, 1964 (age 61); Bukhara Region, Uzbekistan SSR, USSR
- Citizenship: Uzbekistan
- Education: Uzbekistan State Institute of Arts and Culture
- Occupation: Actor
- Years active: 1989–present
- Style: Comedy, drama, melodrama
- Awards: Eng yaxshi ximatlari uchun

Bahshillo Fatullayev (Uzbek: Baxshillo Fatullayev, Бахшулло Фатуллаев; born 15 September 1964) is an Uzbek television and cinema actor.

Bahshillo Fatullayev began his career in the arts in 1989. Fatullayev made his feature film debut in 2012 in Faryod, and has appeared in many TV series and films since then

== Biography ==
Fatullayev Bahshillo Ismatovich was born on September 15, 1964, in the city of Bukhara. After graduating from high school in 1981, he entered the Tashkent Institute of Art and Theater. After graduating from the institute in 1986, he continues his work in the field of art.

== Career ==
From 1986 to 1989, Bakhshillo Fatullayev worked as the head of the cultural center of Bukhara Region. In 2012, he became the father of Said Mukhtorov's film "Faryod". In 2014, her role in "Tears" did not bring her much luck. In 2015, his role in the film "Twin Lovers", in 2016, Farhod and Shirin brought him great success. Producer Ruslan Mirzayev played a role in the film Istanbul billionaire, which brought him success. With the negative protagonist in the film "Panjara", he showed to the public that he is a versatile actor. He starred in Rustam Sadiyev's "Ota Rozi". The series "Battle of Hearts" and "Games of Love", co-produced with Turkey, brought him real fame. In 2021, he appeared in a military role in the film Operation Mercy. Currently, the films awaiting the premiere are directed by Rustam Sadiev, Baron 2 and Producer by Ruslan Mirzayev, Yur Muhabbat.

=== Education ===
- 1970–1981 a student of the 272 nd comprehensive school of Bukhara district of Bukhara Region.
- 1982–1986 a student of the Uzbekistan State Institute of Arts and Culture

== Filmography ==
Below is a chronologically ordered list of films in which Bahshillo Fatullayev has appeared.

Year	Title	Role	Ref
2012	Faryod		
2014	Ko'z yoshim		
2015	Egizak oshiqlar		
2015	Baxt ortidagi dard		
2016	Farxod va Shirin		
2016	Taqdir xazili		
2017	Sevadi sevmaydi		
2018	Panjara		
2019	Ota rozi		
2019	Istanbullik milliarder		
2021	Mehr operatsiyasi	General	
2022	Baron 2		
2024	Sevda		
2025	Egizaklar Turkiyada		

=== Series ===
Year	Title	Ref
2020	Yuraklar jangi	
2020–2021	Ishq oʻyinlari	
2021	Qo’rqma yural	
2022	Yur Muhabbat	
2024	Boj badal	
