= Kazbek (film) =

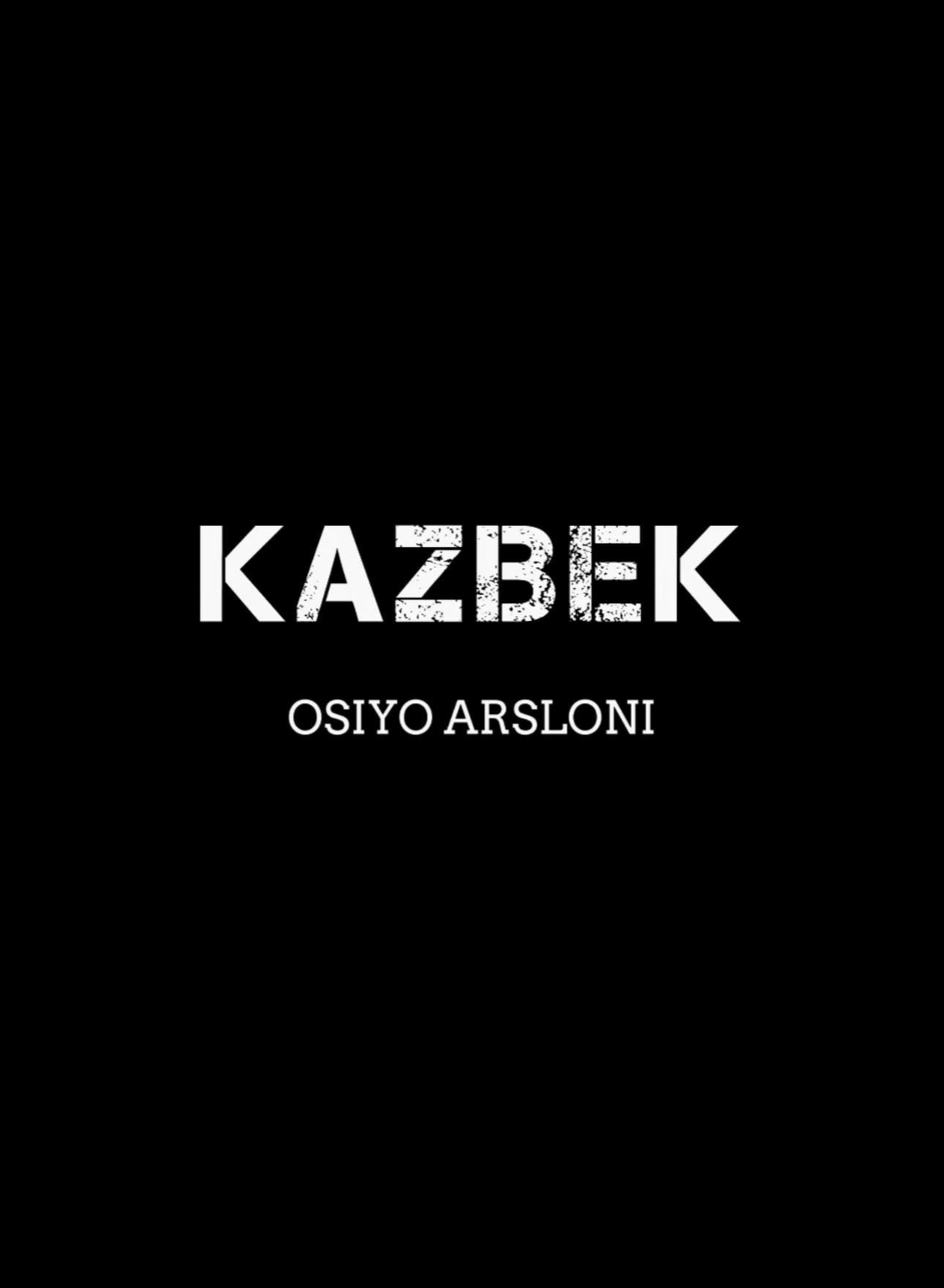
- Uzbek: Osiyo arsloni
- Directed by: Akbar Bekturdiyev
- Written by: Igor Kostyuchenko; Akbar Bekturdiyev
- Starring: Ulugʻbek Qodirov; Fotih Nasimov
- Cinematography: Husan Aliyev
- Music by: Ubaydulla Karimov
- Production company: Cinema of Central Asia
- Distributed by: Cinema of Uzbekistan
- Release date: May 9, 2025
- Running time: 94 minutes
- Countries: Uzbekistan; Belarus
- Languages: Uzbek; Belarusian; Russian; German

Kazbek (Uzbek: Osiyo arsloni, Осиё арслони) is an Uzbek-Belarusian film shot by Akbar Bekturdiyev in cooperation with Uzbekistan and Belarus. The film is based on the life of Mamadali Topivoldiev, Hero of the Soviet Union, and Uzbek actor Ulugʻbek Qodirov played the role.

The film's budget brought in more than $2 million.

== Plot ==
During the Second World War, a group of Uzbek and SSR soldiers organized an assassination attempt on Nazi leaders in the lands of the SSR occupied by the Nazis.

== Cast ==
- Ulugʻbek Qodirov as Mamadali Topivoldiyev (Kazvek)
- Fotih Nasimov
- Dirk Martens
- Vera Kolesnikova
- Elizaveta Shukova
- Aleksandr Ilin
- Nodar Siradze
- Sergey Zhbankov

== Production ==
=== Development ===
The teaser of the project was previously shown on Uzbekistan TV in May 2021. Ulugʻbek Qodirov appears in the film as a soldier living in the forests of Russia. To prepare for the film, Ulugʻbek Qodirov lost 25 kilograms of weight for the film. He also studied wrestling and hand-to-hand combat.

=== Casting ===
In 2021, Adiz Rajabov, Umid Iskandarov, Bekzod Tadjiyev, Shaxrux Xamdamov, YigitAli Mamadjonov and Fatih Nasimov were offered the role of Kazbek, but in the end it was revealed that Ulugʻbek Qodirov will play the main role

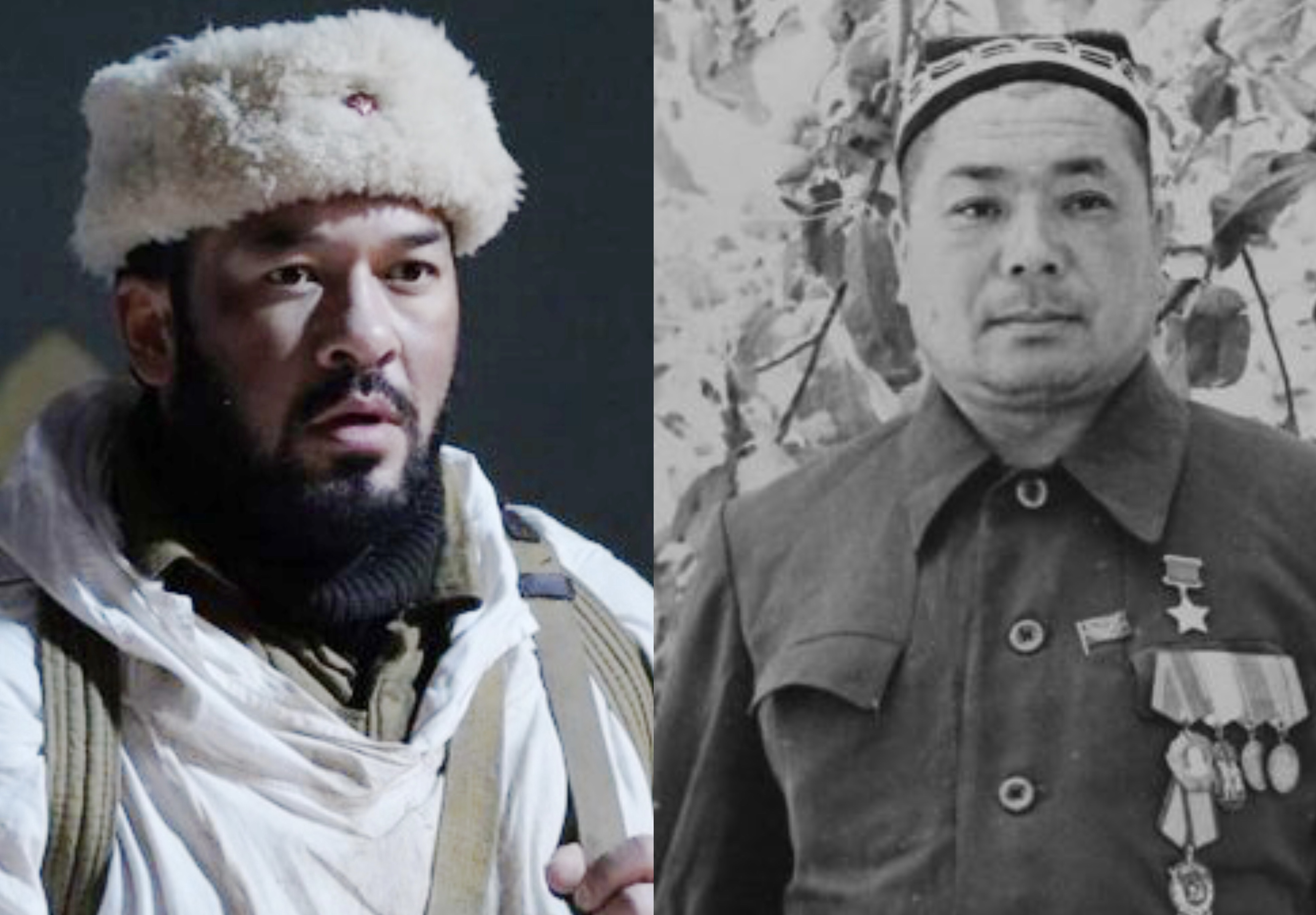
Ulugʻbek Qodirov and Mamadali Topivoldiyev

The principal photography of the film began in March 2022 and the film was predominantly shot and set in Fergana. The shooting of the film was wrapped up in September 2023.

== Creation ==
Before the start of work on the film "Kazbek", an international scientific-practical conference was held in Tashkent in 2021 on the topic "Mamadali Topivoldiyev: her life and artistic expression in films", where the ideological interpretation and script of the film were discussed.

In 2021, the film "Kazbek" was entrusted to director Muhammad Ali Iskandarov. In 2022, Uzbek film changed the director of the film for some reasons. The film "Kazbek" was directed by Akbar Bekturdiyev.

The conference was attended by scientists and historians from Uzbekistan and Belarus, who discussed the biography of Mamadali Topivoldiyev and the interpretation of the events taking place at that time.

Filming of the series was entrusted to the film company Cinema of Central Asia. Famous Uzbek, German and Belarusian actors played in the film.

The atmosphere of that era was revived at the Cinema of Central Asia film site. In cooperation with the Belarusian creative group, city and battlefield landscapes were built on a 50-hectare area. World War II squares, houses, roads, bridges and buildings were created.

== Awards and nominations ==
Year	Premium	Nomination	Result	Source
2026	"Lendoc Film Festival — LEFF"	"Best Actor"	Won	

== Soundtrack ==
Hayot

Soundtrack album by: Ubaydulla Karimov
- Released: 2023
- Genre: Feature Film soundtrack
- Length: 10:16
- Label: Fox Music
- Producer: Firdavs Abduxoliqov

Ubaydulla Karimov chronology
Uzbek Qizi (2022)	Hayot (2023)	Hur Qiz (2011)
