= Rihsitilla Abdullaev =

Uzbek actor

Rihsitilla Abdullaev Russian: Рихситилла Абдуллаев
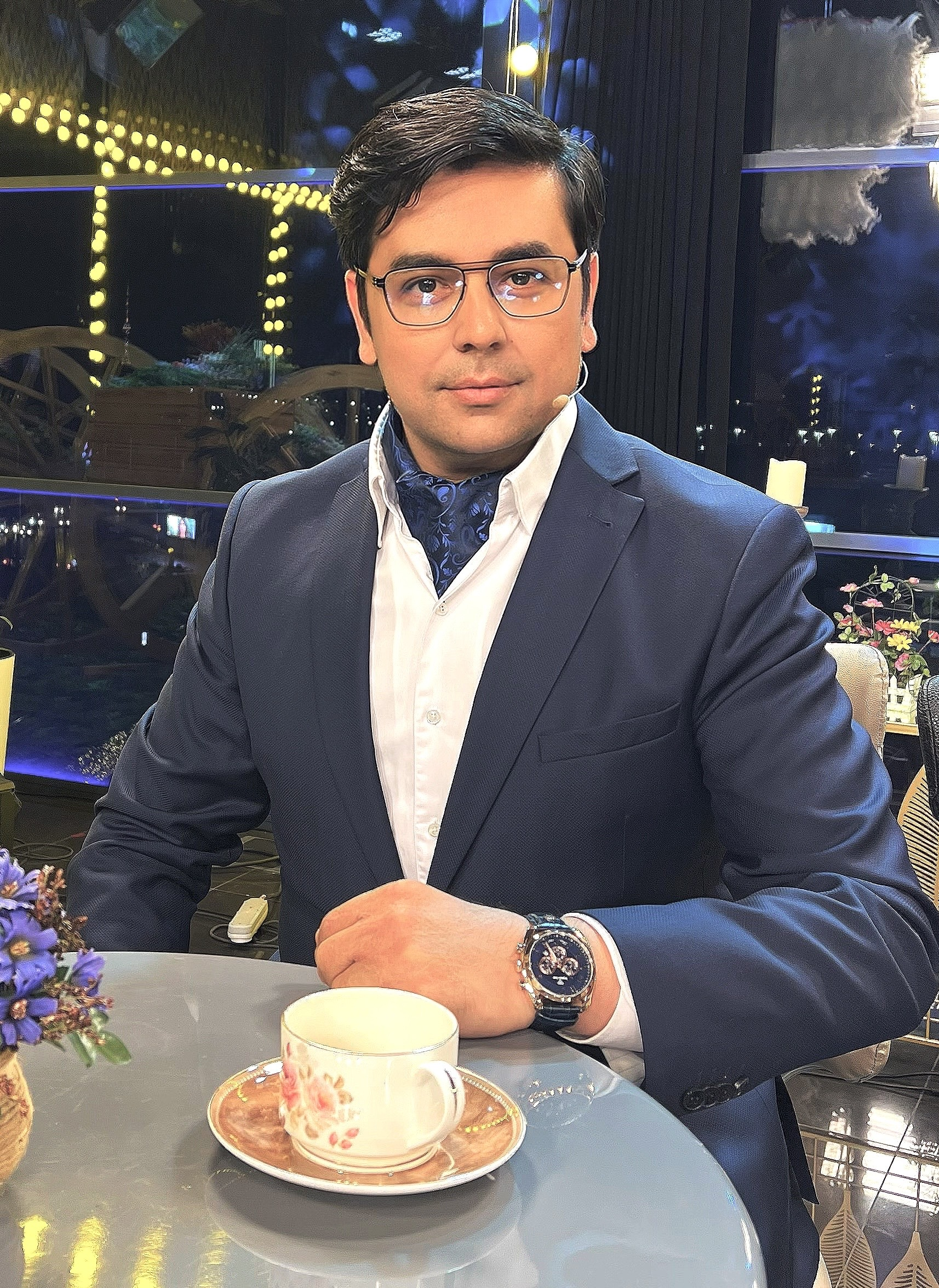
- Born: Rikhsilla Nigmatullaevich Abdullaev; April 5, 1978 (age 48); Tashkent, Uzbek SSR, USSR
- Occupation: Actor
- Years active: 1999–present
- Children: Tojirahmon Negmatullaev: Asilzoda Negmatullaeva; Mohizoda Negmatullaeva

Rihsitilla Abdullaev, (Uzbek: Rihsitilla Abdullaev, Рихситилла Абдуллаев) (born April 5, 1978) is an Uzbek theater and film actor and TV presenter.

== Life ==
Rihsitilla Nigmatullayevich Abdullaev was born on April 5, 1978, in Tashkent, the capital of Uzbekistan. He graduated from school number 272 in Tashkent. In 1995, he entered the Uzbekistan State Institute of Arts and Culture, Department of Drama and Film Acting. He later received a master's degree from the same university. The Uzbek National Academic Drama Theater has been operating since 1999. Rihsitilla created unique images in more than 50 performances between 1999 and 2021. In 2011, he received the "Best TV presenter of the Year" award in Uzbekistan. Rihsitilla Abdullaev gained wide recognition and fame in Uzbekistan in 2006 after starring in the Uzbek drama film "Soʼgʼdiyona".

Sevgi series are based on life events in 2020. The series opened new pages in the Uzbek series and brought a lot of attention to Avdullayev. Abdullayevʻs Ishq o'yinlari series, shot in collaboration with Turkish artists, brought him great fame.

=== Education ===
- 1985–1995—a student of the 272nd comprehensive school of Yunusabad district of Tashkent.
- 1995–1999—a student of the Uzbekistan State Institute of Arts and Culture.
- 2004–2006—he graduated from the Uzbekistan State Institute of Arts and Culture with a master's degree.

== Personal life ==
In 2002, Rihsitilla Abdullaev married Nodira Abdullaeva (Ahmedova), the daughter of People's Artist of Uzbekistan Yoqub Ahmedov. They now have 3 children:

- Tojirahmon Negmatullaev was born on October 19, 2003, in Tashkent.
- Asilzoda Negmatullayeva was born on September 29, 2008 in Tashkent.
- Mohizoda Negmatullaeva was born on November 30, 2009 in Tashkent.

== Filmography ==
Below is a chronologically ordered list of films in which Abdullaev has appeared.

Year	Film	Role
2002	Muhabbat sinovlari	
2005	Kelgindi kuyov	
2006	Soʻgʻdiyona	
2009	Qalbaki dunyo	
2008	Telba	
2009	Ichki kuyov	
2010	Xijron	
2010	Shaddod qiz	
2011	Sarob	
2012	Jigarbandim	
2013	Soddigina qizaloq	
2014	Ayriliq	
2016	Virus	
2016	Meni sev	
2017	Zulmat	
2022	Mening toʻyim	

=== Series ===
Year	Serial	Role
2013	Kaminaning oilasi	
2016	Maftuna	
2020	Zaxarli tomchilar	
2020	Sevgi	
2020-2021	Ishq o'yinlari	
2021-2022	Baxt ovchilari	
2024	Ikkichi ota	

=== Performances ===
Roles in theater
Year	Spectacle	Role
2000	Qirol Lir	Osvald
2000	Joxon otin Uvaysi	Madalixon
2001	Adibning umri	Botir
2001	Enaga	Gofurjon
2002	Navoiy	Alisher
2003	Makr va Muxabbat	Ferdinant
2003	Rusram	Boyto’ra
2004	Uyqusiz kecha	Botir
2004	Tun albatda o’tadi	Eriko
2005	Senga bir gap aytaman	Bobosh
2006	Andishalik kelinchak	Arslon
2006	Xalal	Sharif
2007	Yoz tuni garoyibotlari	Kuyo’v
2007	Tili Asalim	Kuyov
2008	Chegara ustidagi uy	Diplomat
2009	Jodugar kanizak	Shahzoda
2010	Sexrli tanbur	Tanburchi
2011	Faridaning dil daftari	Kamron
2012	Yetti fared	Santelyano
2013	Bir qadam yoʻq	Nabira
2014	Oʻtkan zamon hangomalari	
2014	Dadajon demayman	Alisher
2015	Bir Koshona sirlari	Itboqar
2015	Parimoinot	Misr Shoxi
2016	Qalliq o’yini	Qo’shni
2017	Qirmizi olma	Muxsin
2017	Muqaddas Tahtizat	Klit
2018	Usmon Nosir	Goʻsha
2019	Urmon siri	Qaroqchi
2019	Ali-Shir Nava'i	Mansur
2020	Mirzo Ulugʻbek	Elchi
2020	Revizor	Hlestakov
2021	12 oy	Kansler
2021	Urush odamlari	Mirzaqul Rais

=== Television ===
- Oydin hayot (Oʻzbekiston, 2007–2018)
- Oltin kalit (Milliy TV, 2019–2020)
- Uxlamaysizmi (Zo'r TV, 2024)
- Kim millioner bo'lmoqchi? (Zo'r TV, 2025)

== Awards ==
- In 2010, he was awarded the Badge of Uzbekistan.
- 2011 The best TV presenter of the year
- 30th anniversary of independence of Uzbekistan.
