= Khamid Nizamov =

Professional Uzbek bodybuilder

- Professional bodybuilder
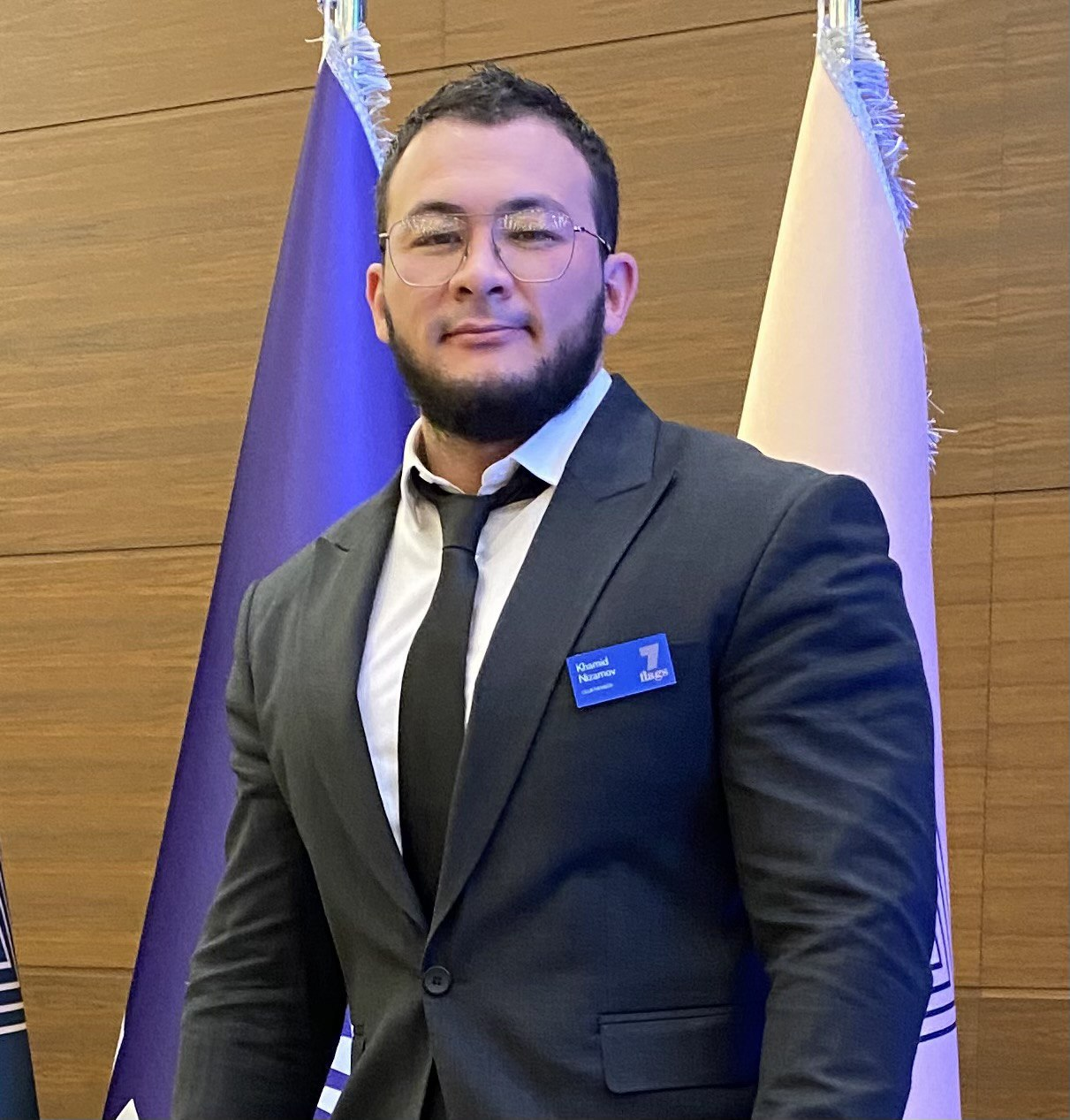

Personal info
- Born: Khamid Nizamov Alimovch; August 15, 1987; Gijduvan, Bukhara Region, Uzbek SSR, USSR

Best statistics
- Height: 173 cm (5 ft 8 in)
- Weight: 95 kg (209 lb)

Professional (Pro) career
- Pro-debut: Uzbekistan Open Championship; 10 December 2011
- Best win: Champion of Kazakhstan and Central Asian Championships in Body Building and Fitness; 2015
- Active: 2010–present

Khamid Nizamov (uzb: Hamid Nizomov, ru: Хамид Низамов; born August 15, 1987) is an Uzbek professional bodybuilder, actor and Master of Sports of Uzbekistan in bodybuilding. In 2016, the Bukhara Region Bodybuilding Federation was founded under the leadership of Khamid Nizamov who is the current president.

== Biography ==
Khamid Nizamov Alimovch was born on August 15, 1987, in the city of Gijduvan in the Bukhara Region. He started his professional career in bodybuilding in 2010. In 2013, he graduated from Tashkent State University of Economics. His best result as a bodybuilder is 14th place at the WBPF World Championship, 1st place at the Central Asian and Kazakhstan Championships, 1st place twice in the Uzbekistan Open Championship. The athlete is married and has 4 children.

== List of competitions ==
Khamid Nizamov in Bodybuilding Competitions
Year	Competition	Result
2011	Uzbekistan Open Championship	1st
2012	IFBB Asian Championship	5th
2014	WBPF World Championship	14th
2014	Uzbekistan Open Championship	1st
2014	Central Asia and Kazakhstan Championship	1st, 2nd in athlet-physique
2015	Central Asia and Kazakhstan Championship	1st
2015	Tashkent Cup	2nd
2016	Central Asia and Kazakhstan Championship	3rd
2016	Tashkent Cup	4th, 1st up to 80 kg among men

== Filmography ==
- 2019 Sniper — Azamat
- 2020 Ishq o'yinlari — Said
- 2022 Yur Muhabbat — Hamza

== See also ==
- List of male professional bodybuilders
- List of female professional bodybuilders
