= Yuraklar jangi =

- Also known as: Battle of Hearts
- Written by: Saida Vahabova; Feruza Fattohova
- Directed by: Ozod Shams
- Starring: Umid Irgashev; Saida Rametova; Sitora Alimjonova; Ozod Shams; Rayhon Ulasenova; Bahshillo Fatullayev; Sardor Zoirov; Aleksandr Bekjanov; Mömin Rizo
- Theme music composer: Farruh Sobirov
- Country of origin: Uzbekistan; Turkey
- Original language: Uzbek
- No. of episodes: 73

Production
- Producer: Ruslan Mirzayev
- Running time: 31 minutes

Original release
- Network: Sevimli TV
- Release: 5 December 2018 – 6 August 2019

Yuraklar jangi - Battle of hearts is an Uzbek drama series produced by Ruslan Mirzayev that premiered on Sevimli TV on December 5, 2018. The series consists of two seasons and aired from October 5, 2018 to August 6, 2019.

The series was shot in collaboration with Turkish filmmakers in Turkey and Uzbekistan. The filmmakers, who initially announced the filming of the series "Güneşim benim", later told to media that they did not have the funds to shoot the series. The filmmakers have agreed to co-produce "Yuraklar jangi" instead of "Güneşim benim".

== Cast ==
- Umid Irgashev as Tohir
- Saida Rametova as Nozima, Tohir's mother
- Azim Yo'ldoshev as Ali
- Rayhon Ulasenova as Sanam
- Sitora Alimjonova as Shirina
- Ozod Shams as Ahror
- Zuhra Nasrullayeva as Zuhra
- Azamat Qodirov as Ravshan, Ali's friend
- Baxshillo Fatullayev as Jasur
- Jahongir Muhtorov as Husayn
- Mömin Rizo as Bobur
- Sardor Zoirov as Doniyor
- Gulruh Pirnazarova as Zanjabila
- Akmal Mirzo as Shukur
- Muhlisa Sohibova as Shukur's mother
- Fotima Nazarova as maidservant Munira
- Dilbar Ikromova as Umida hola
- Begzod Inog'omov as Botir
