= Ishq o'yinlari (TV series) =

Uzbek TV-Series

- Also known as: Games of Love
- Written by: Saida Vahabova; Ozan Ayaz
- Directed by: Ozod Shams
- Starring: Umid Irgashev; Сардор Зоиров; Khamid Nizamov; Saida Rametova; Rihsitilla Abdullaev; Gürkan Uygun; Sefa Zengin; Jamila Gafurova; Bahshillo Fatullayev
- Theme music composer: Farruh Sobirov
- Country of origin: Uzbekistan; Turkey; United States
- Original language: Uzbek
- No. of episodes: 48

Production
- Producer: Ruslan Mirzayev
- Running time: 33 minutes

Original release
- Network: Sevimli TV
- Release: 7 December 2020 – 18 January 2021

Ishq o'yinlari - Games of Love is an Uzbek television drama that aired on Sevimli TV.

The series, produced by Ruslan Mirzayev, was shot in collaboration with Uzbek and Turkish filmmakers in three countries: Uzbekistan, Turkey and the United States. The main roles in the film were played by Uzbek actors Umid Irgashev, Saida Rametova, Jamila Gafurova and Turkish actors Gürkan Uygun, Beran Ozel and Sefa Zengin.

== Plot ==
The protagonist of the series, Said's wife Nigina, could not have children. The childless family adopts Said's brother's newborn baby. However, Said's daughter-in-law eventually changed her mind. She suffers for giving her child to others, Said returns the baby to his daughter-in-law. The film shows the events that took place in this family.

== Cast ==
- Umid Irgashev as Shohrux
- Jamila Gafurova as Nigina
- Сардор Зоиров as Kamol
- Khamid Nizamov as Said
- Shokhrullo Abdullaev as Shokhrullo
- Saida Rametova as Oydin opa
- Rihsitilla Abdullaev as Sanjar
- Gürkan Uygun as Iskandar
- Sefa Zengin as Kadir
- Umid Zokirov as Jovlon
- Beran Ozel as Ozlem
- Emre Kerem as Serdar
- Muyassar Berdiqulova as Shahzoda Sobirovna
- Bahshillo Fatullayev as Ravshan aka
- Murat Aydin as Aziz
- Barchin Gafurova as Lola
- Azim Yoldoshev as Sharif
- Tahsin Lale as Mustafa
- Kemal Balibas as Jengiz
- Ekrem Ispir as Murat
