= Sairam Isaeva =

Tajik actress

Sairam Negmatovna Isaeva (born 24 November 1942) is a Tajik actress. People's Artist of the Tajik SSR (1986).

== Early life and education ==
Sairam Isaeva was born on 24 November 1942 in Stalinabad, Tajik SSR (now Dushanbe, Tajikistan). She is Tajik by nationality. In 1964, she graduated from the Tashkent Theatre and Artistic Art Institute, named after Alexander Ostrovsky.

== Career ==
Since 1964, Isaeva was an actress in the Leninabad Music and Drama Theater named after Alexander Pushkin (since 1991 - the Khujand Theater of Musical Comedy named after Kamal Khujandi). In the 2000s, she was the chief director of this theater for seven years. Then Isaeva continued to work there as a stage master.

Since 1962, Isaeva has been acting in films at the film studios "Tajikfilm" and "Uzbekfilm". Since 1973, she is a member of the Union of Cinematographers of the USSR.

In 1971, Isaeva was awarded the title of Honored Artist of the Tajik SSR, and in 1986 - People's Artist of the Tajik SSR.

== Selected filmography ==
- 1962 - There will be no silence - Lutfiya
- 1966 - White, white storks - Malika
- 1971 - Rustam and Sukhrab - Gurdofarid
- 1973 - Meetings and partings - Hafiz's wife
- 1974 - One life is not enough - Saida
- 1977 - House under the hot sun - Zainab
- 1980 - What are our years! - Aminahon, Maya's mother
- 1981 - Criminal and lawyers - headteacher
- 1982 - Two chapters from the family chronicle - Sairam
- 1982 - If you love ... - Malika
- 1982 - Coup according to instructions 107 - Halima Atajanova
- 1983 - Family Secrets - Zumrad
- 1987 - Incident at the airport - Saidov's mother
