= Mamadali Topivoldiyev =

Soviet soldier

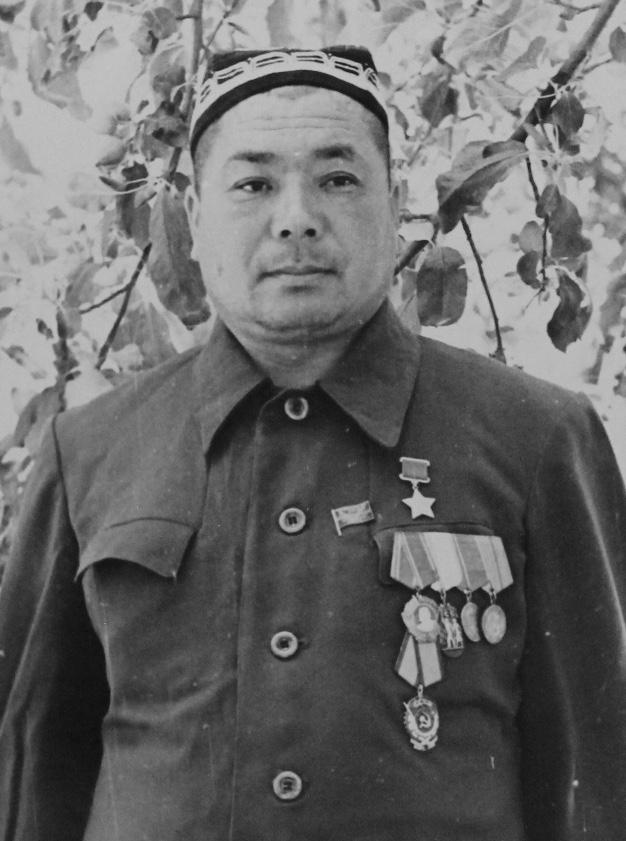
- Born: 20 September 1919; Pandigon, Rishton volost, Kokand uezd, Fergana Oblast, Turkestan ASSR
- Died: 6 May 1969 (aged 49); Zoxidon, Rishton District, Fergana Region, Uzbek SSR, USSR
- Burial place: Zoxidon cemetery
- Military career
- Allegiance: Soviet Union
- Nicknames: "Osiyo arsloni" (English: "Asian lion"), "Osiyo yoʻlbarsi" (English: "Asian tiger”), "Kazbek" "Tolya Kazbek", "Tolik"
- Commands: Reconnaissance unit of the 5th detachment of the "Chekist" partisan brigade
- Conflicts: World War II; Belarusian resistance
- Awards: Hero of the Soviet Union
- Other work: Head of “Communism" kolkhoz in Rishton District

Mamadali Topivoldiyev (Note: His name is alternatively spelled as Topvaldyev (Топвалдыев), Topiboldiyev (Топиболдиев), and Topyvoldiyev (Топыволдиев)) (20 September 1919 – 6 May 1969) was a Soviet soldier who became commander of the reconnaissance unit of the 5th detachment of the Chekist Partisan Brigade of the Belorussian resistance. For his partisan activities he was awarded the title Hero of the Soviet Union on 15 August 1944, and the Nazis offered a reward of 50,000 Reichsmarks for his capture.

== Early life ==
Topivoldiyev was born on 20 September 1919 (Note: Some sources indicate he was born on 3 September 1919) to an Uzbek peasant family in the village of Pandigan, located in what is now the Rishton District of present-day Uzbekistan. His father Topvoldi was a farmer and his mother Melibuva was a housewife. Mamadali was the eldest of their four children. After completing primary school in 1934 he initially worked as a postman before becoming a tractor driver on a kolkhoz and working at the Serovo railway station. When he was drafted into the Red Army in 1939 and stationed in Babruysk as a driver in the 130th Artillery Regiment, he knew no Russian, but by 1941 he had developed a limited understanding of the language, which improved over time.

== World War II ==
After the German invasion of the Soviet Union in 1941, he participated in the battles to defend Belarus from the onslaught of Nazi invaders. However, his unit soon became encircled by the Germans near Barysaw, and he sustained a severe leg injury. Only Topvaldiyev and his comrade Ivan Rylkov managed to escape the encirclement, so they left for the village of Pisarevo where Ivan’s mother lived. Ivan’s mother sheltered both of them in her house, but another villager informed the Germans of their whereabouts. As result, German soldiers broke into her house, beat her, and burned the house down, but Topivoldiyev survived the fire, hiding in the cellar under a pile of potatoes. Soon Topivoldiyev and Rylkov joined the local partisan detachment led by Aleksandr Simdyankin.

In November 1941 Topivoldiyev and fellow partisan Nikolai Pakhota attacked a prisoner-of-war camp in Barysaw, freeing 146 prisoners from the camp.

In February 1942, Topivoldiyev was captured by the Hilfspolizei and became a prisoner-of-war.; (Note: Sources differ as to the reason he was captured by the auxiliary police in 1942; some indicate that it was because he helped villagers hide grain from the Nazis, but others indicate it was because he was captured during a reconnaissance mission) however, he soon escaped, killing a guard in the process. He then banded up with thirteen soldiers who were scattered amongst local villages, and then they joined the partisan detachment led by Gerasim Kirpich.

The detachment was very diverse, containing people of numerous ethnicities including Russian, Ukrainian, Belorussian, Mordvin, Jewish, Kumyk, Ossetian, Chuvash, Udmurt, Kazakh, and Uzbek.

The detachment soon united with several other local detachments to form a brigade in July 1942. Topivoldiyev then became the commander of the 5th detachment reconnaissance unit. His first task was to attack an enemy train heading to Minsk. In October executed a plan to lure German soldiers to an ambush by herding livestock that the Nazis had taken from villagers. The brigade continued to expand in size, but it still did not maintain communication with the Central Command. Topivoldiyev was tasked with delivering important information about Nazi military activities to Moscow. He successfully reached Moscow, where he went on to attend training in sabotage before returning to his brigade in spring 1943.

After returning to the brigade, Topivoldiyev continued to lead partisan operations, teaming up with Nikolai Kayanov to conduct operations. Their operations included missions on 27 September 1943 he and Kayanov killed three enemy soldiers and wounded seven others in near Sviryana village, and when on 12 October 1943 they fire to German barracks. In November that year they engaged in many operations, blowing up an enemy truck on 3 November killing a junior officer and seven enemy soldiers. Three days later they blew up a truck transporting weapons, killing five enemy soldiers, and on 9 November they set fire to a warehouse, and then three days after that they blew up an enemy car killing 6 enemy soldiers. In June 1944 Topivoldiyev participated in his last battle, after which Belarus was liberated from Nazi occupation. He was then released from military service later that year. His last task was delivering a package of important documents to the mainland, which he completed successfully. For his bravery in battle he was awarded the title Hero of the Soviet Union.

Throughout the war Topivoldiyev would carve his nickname Kazbek on a tree after an operation as a calling card, and it became his nickname. During the war he personally killed 76 German soldiers and captured a German general.

== Postwar ==
After being released from military service he briefly lived in Minsk, where he worked as a driver, but soon returned to the Uzbek SSR. His friends from the war Nikolai Apanasenko and Ivan Kurushev moved to Uzbekistan with him. They visited Belarus every year on the anniversary of the liberation of Belarus from the Nazi occupation.

He served as a deputy in the Supreme Soviet of the Uzbek SSR. He held several jobs before becoming chairman of the "Communism" collective farm in 1954. He was stabbed to death by a madman on 6 May 1969 (Note: Many sources incorrectly indicate that he died on 7 May 1969; however, his obituary published in the 7 May 1969 issue of the newspaper Sovet Oʻzbekistoni specifically said that he died on 6 May 1967.) and was buried in the cemetery in Zoxidon next to his partisan comrades Nikolai Apanasenko and Ivan Kurushev.

== Family ==
During his military service, Mamadali Topivoldiyev formed a familial bond with Lidia Kornelova, an intelligence officer. Nevertheless, Lydia was apprehended by the German forces while carrying out her designated military responsibilities. Lydia, who successfully evaded imprisonment, afterward affiliated herself with another group and, with their assistance, arrived in the urban center of Petropavl in Kazakhstan. It is worth noting that during her time in Petropavl, Lydia encountered Valentina, the daughter of Topivoldiyev, who was born during this period. In the year 1946, Mamadali Topivoldiyev entered into matrimony with Donokhan Usmonkhojayeva, a resident of Uirat village in the Rishton area. The individual in question had a total of eight children, namely Mubarakkhan (1946-2010), Ahmadali (1949-2009), Hamidjon (1956-2009), Mavludakhon (1959), Hasanboy (1962), Matlubakhon (1962), Farhodjon (1963), and Kahramon (1965). The topic at hand is Topivoldiyev. It's worth noting that Ahmadali Topivoldiyev chose to bestow his father's name onto one of his offspring.

== Awards ==
- Hero of the Soviet Union (15 August 1944)
- Medal "For Battle Merit" (13 November 1942)
- Medal "To a Partisan of the Patriotic War" 1st class (29 June 1944)
- Order of the Red Star (15 August 1944)
- Medal "For Courage"
- Order of the Red Banner of Labour
- Order of the Badge of Honour (30 April 1966)
- campaign and jubilee medals

== Remembrance ==
A bust of Topivoldiyev is in the Alley of Heroes in Kruhlaye, Belarus and there is a bust of him in the village of Zoxidon; there are streets named after him in several cities in Uzbekistan. There is an exhibit at a museum of the Vorontsevich secondary school in Talachyn District dedicated to him and a museum dedicated to him in Pandigon village.

== In film ==
Topivoldiyev’s life was the inspiration for plot of the movie Unforgotten song (Russian: Незабытая песня; the Uzbek language version of the film was titled Kazbek). The role of Mamadali was played by Rustam Sagdullayev.

He was also the subject of the 2003 documentary Son of Two Nations (Russian: Сын двух народов directed by Mukim Yuldashev, the 2019 documentary They Liberated Belarus (Russian: Они освобождали Беларусь, an episode titled Partisan Mamadali Topvoldiyev (Uzbek: Partizan Mamadali Topvoldiyev) of the film series Unforgettable Heroes in 2021. That year, plans were made at the 13th Tashkent International Film Festival to shoot a film about him. Filming for it began in Fergana in 2022, with Ulugʻbek Qodirov playing the role of Topivoldiyev; originally the title of the film was intended to be Kazbek but later the name of the film was changed to Asian Lion (Uzbek: Osiyo arsloni).

== Awards ==
- Hero of the Soviet Union
- Order of Lenin
- Order of the Red Banner of Labour
- Order of the Red Star
- Medal "For Courage"
- Medal "To a Partisan of the Patriotic War"
- jubilee medals

== Literature ==
- Zohidov, Toʻlqinjon (2019). "Kazbek" — rishtonlik partizan (in Uzbek). Fergana: „Fargʻona“ nashriyoti.
- Apanasenko, Vyacheslav (2008). Семья Апанасенко из кубанского хутора Братского (PDF) (in Russian). Kuban.
