= Shokhrullo Abdullaev =

Uzbek singer, composer, actor

- Uzbek: Shokhrullo Abdullaev
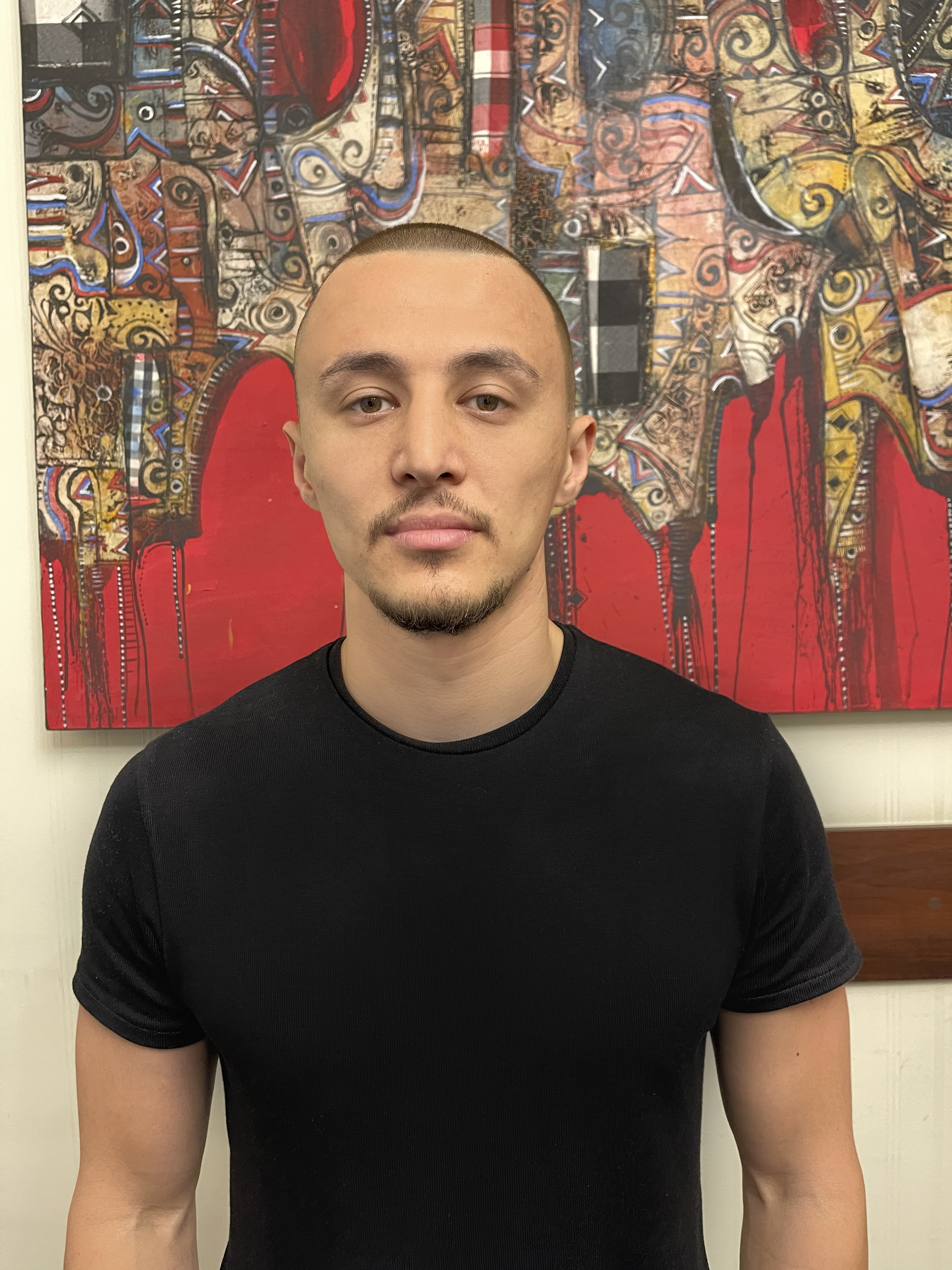
- Born: Shokhrullo Abdullaev Sagdulla O’g’li; 14 January 1993 (age 33); Tashkent, Uzbekistan
- Citizenship: Uzbekistan
- Education: American Academy of Dramatic Arts; Westminster International University in Tashkent
- Occupations: Singer, actor, composer
- Years active: 2010–present
- Style: Pop, Soul music
- Awards: Golden Pen Award

Shokhrullo Abdullaev (sometimes spelled Шохрулло Aбдуллаев in Uzbek) (Uzbek: Shokhrullo Abdullaev, Абдуллаев Шохрулло) is an Uzbek singer and actor.

== Personal life ==
Shokhrullo Abdullaev was born on 14 January 1993, in Tashkent. Shokhrullo graduated from American Academy of Dramatic Arts with a degree in acting / directing, as well as with a degree in law from Westminster International University in Tashkent. He is unmarried.

== Career ==
Shokhrullo has had a great interest in the arts since childhood. There was no art-related person in his family whose father was an entrepreneur and his mother a pulmonologist. Family members thought Shokhrullo would take over his father's profession. He first entered Westminster International University in Tashkent. He then went to the United States and secretly entered the American Academy of Dramatic Arts. Shokhrullo is also known as an actor in addition to singing. He started his acting career at a young age and got his first big and important role in 2010 in the movie "Game within game". Due to his studies, his acting career was suspended for 7 years and then he starred in "Hamroh" in 2017 and "Istanbullik Milliarder" in 2019. The main role played by Shokhrullo as an actor is a film about the emergency landing of the plane by Captain Zarif Saidazimov on 11 September 2001. In the film 101 Flight filmed in 2020, Shokhrullo played one of the main roles, passenger Shohrux.

== Discography ==
=== Music videos ===
Year	Title	Director
2017	"You"	
2019	"Tun"	
2019	"Bu kecha"	
2019	"Moviy ko'zlar"	
2020	"Lola"	
