= Bakhrom Yakubov =

Uzbek filmmaker (born 1961)

- Born: Bakhrom Yakubov; 1 April 1961; Tashkent, Uzbek SSR, USSR
- Died: 11 March 2021 (aged 59); Tashkent, Uzbekistan
- Citizenship: Uzbekistan
- Education: Uzbekistan State Institute of Arts and Culture
- Occupations: Film director; screenwriter
- Years active: 1989–2021

Bakhrom Yakubov (Uzbek: Bahrom Yoqubov, Russian: Бахром Якубов; 1 April 1961 – 11 March 2021) was an Uzbek film director and screenwriter. He is known for directing the films Sarvinoz (2004), Baxt uchun million (2005), Fotima and Zuhra (2006), Super Daughter-in-Law (2008), Ichkuyov (2009), Majruh (2010), and Yondiradi Kuydiradi (2011).

== Biography ==
Bahrom Yaqubov was born in 1961 in the city of Tashkent in a family of intellectuals. He graduated from the acting faculty of the Tashkent Theater and Art Institute named after A.N. Ostrovsky. He worked as an assistant director at Uzbekfilm and Uzbektelefilm studios. His first work as a director was the short feature film "Diary of a Young Writer", which was shot in 1989. Then he shot documentaries for many years. He entered the big cinemas in 2003 with the full-length film "Sarvinoz".

He began his creative career in 1989 by shooting a short film called "The Diary of a Young Writer". During his career, "Romeo and Juliet", "Sarvinoz" (2004), "Sarvinoz-2 - a million for happiness", "Fatima and Zuhra" (2005), "Sogdiana" (2006), "Super Daughter-in-Law" (2008), " Taslandiq", "Ichkuyov" (2009), "Majruh" (2010), "Yondiradi — kuyudiradi" (2011), "O Maryam, Maryam" have filmed the films.

== Filmography ==
Below is a chronologically ordered list of films in which Bakhrom Yakubov has appeared.

Year	Film	Role	Ref
1989	Yosh yozuvchining kundaligi		
2004	Sarvinoz	Director Writer	
2005	Baxt uchun million	Director Writer	
2006	Fotima and Zuhra	Director Writer	
2006	Sogdiana	Director Writer	
2007	Zumrad and Qimmat	Director Writer	
2008	Tashlandiq	Director Writer	
2008	Super Daughter-in-Law	Director Writer	
2009	Ichkuyov	Director Writer	
2010	Majruh	Director Writer	
2011	Yondiradi Kuydiradi	Director Writer	
2011	Jodugar	Director Writer	
2012	Men yulduzman	Director Writer	
2012	O Maryam, Maryam	Director Writer	
2013	Fotima and Zuxra 2	Director Writer	
2014	Tungi mehmon	Director Writer	
2015	Qochqin	Director Writer	
2016	Boyvachcha kuyov	Director Writer	
2017	Majruh 2	Director Writer	
2020	Oʻzbekcha ajrashish	Director Writer	
