= Sevginator =

Uzbek film

- Directed by: Abduvohid Gʻaniyev
- Screenplay by: Shoira Gʻiyosova
- Produced by: Rustam Saʼdiyev
- Starring: Manzura Yoʻldosheva; Ulugʻbek Qodirov; Murod Rajabov; Shafoat Rahmatullayeva; Botir Muhammadxoʻjayev
- Music by: Doniyor Aʼzamov
- Production company: „Davr“
- Distributed by: Oʻzbekkino
- Release date: 2007
- Running time: 102 minutes
- Country: Uzbekistan
- Language: Uzbek

Sevginator is a 2007 Uzbek comedy film directed by Abduvohid Gʻaniyev and produced by Rustam Saʼdiyev. Actors such as Manzura Yoldosheva, Ulugʻbek Qodirov, Murad Rajabov, Shafoat Rahmatullayeva, and Aziz Rametov played the main roles in the film based on the script of Shoira Giyosova

== Plot ==
A graduate student named Akmal creates a robot girl. But in order not to arouse the interest of other people and the executive aunt, she introduces him as "Malamat". Akmal makes the robot's face look like a teacher named Maftuna, whom he has a crush on, and sets it up against athletes to test its skills. And the robot bites them. After that, he sends "Malohat" to teach the worst group of the institute, who threw him and Maftuna into the sewer in the rain, and insulted all the teachers in the institute. He mocked them with nicknames while he organized the worst group in the institute. The dean of the institute, Hashim Sokiyevich, Akmal, Maftuna, and all the teachers of the institute will be happy about this.

Meanwhile, "Malomat" falls in love with Akmal, but Akmal insults her by saying that she is not a human, but a robot. "Malomat" can make a robot that looks like the one he gave to Akmal, and when Akmal sees it, he falls in love. And the film ends with the following sentences of 2 robots:

- "Thank you, I love you!"
- I love you too...

== Cast ==
- Manzura Yoʻldosheva — Maftuna Sodikova, a young teacher, and Malomat, a female robot;
- Ulugʻbek Qodirov — Akmal, inventor and engineer
- Murod Rajabov — Hashim Sokiyevich, dean of the institute;
- Shafoat Rahmatullayeva — Tenant Aunt or "Anaconda";
- Botir Muhammadxoʻjayev — Borbi, Saruhan's husband;
- Yulduz Hamidova — Saruxan;
- Aziz Rametov — Otabek, student;
- Qahramon Abdurahimov — Maftuna's father;
- Bosit Rahmatov — Shokir Samadov, student;
- Dildora Hoshimova — Vasila, friend of Maftuna;
- Farruh Komilov — Qodirov, student;
- Lola Ergasheva — Hadicha, Maftuna's mother;
- Ahmad Berdimurodov — coach;
- Farrux Soipov — Farruh

=== Epizodlarda ===
- Shuhrat Ulliyev — „Shrek“, student
- Durdona Tursunboyeva
- Rixsivoy Aliyev — teacher;
- Barno Jalolova;
- Feruza Roʻziyeva;
- Zuhra Soliyeva — bus ticket clerk;
- Ozoda Abdullayeva
- Dilbek Toʻrayev — Dilbek, student;
- Umida Norboyeva;
- Alina Mamadaliyeva;
- Alina Sayfulina;
- Hilola Toshmuhamedova;
- Shahlo Karimova;
- Nilufar Ergasheva.

== Taking pictures ==
Manzura did not want to appear in the film, and the director told her that "there is no other cold face like you"

== Film music ==
The music in the film was written by the composer Daniyor Azamov.
