= Uch Qahramon =

- Directed by: Shoxrux Rasulov
- Written by: Shoxrux Rasulov
- Produced by: Firdavs Fridunovich Abduxoliqov Muzifa Sultonova Gayrat Muminov Furkat Usmanov
- Starring: Ulugʻbek Qodirov; Shoxrux Xamdamov; Taukel Musilim; Mohlaroy Sobirova
- Cinematography: Azizbek Normatov
- Edited by: Timur Kiyasov
- Music by: Aleksey Izvolskiy
- Production company: Spectre studio
- Distributed by: Cinema of Uzbekistan
- Release date: November 29, 2024
- Running time: 158 minutes
- Country: Uzbekistan

Uch Qahramon – Three heroes (Uzbek: Уч Кахрамон) is an Uzbek film shot by Shahrukh Rasulov in cooperation with the Department of Public Security of the Ministry of Internal Affairs of Uzbekistan and the Cinematography Agency of Uzbekistan.

== Plot ==
Three detectives fight against a large criminal gang. Reveals the secrets of the largest criminal gangs in Tashkent. The film talks about the difficulties of internal affairs officers.

== Cast ==
- Ulugʻbek Qodirov
- Shaxrux Xamdamov
- Taukel Musilim
- Muxammad Ali Maxmadov
- Sirojiddin Sattarov
- Uchqun Tillayev
- Mohlaroy Sobirova

== Production ==
=== Development ===
The film was announced in January 2022 with a motion poster by Uzbekfilm. Principal photography began in March 2022 in Tashkent and was completed in December 2022.

=== Casting ===
The film was reported by mass media of Uzbekistan. At the beginning of 2021, Ulugʻbek Qodirov, In addition, casting director Firuza Ashurova announced that Shaxrux Xamdamov and Kazakh actor Taukel Muslim will participate in the film.

The main shooting of the film began in 2022, and the film was shot mainly in Tashkent and the Tashkent Region. The filming of the film was completed in 2023.

== Creation ==
According to the order of the Cinematography Agency of Uzbekistan, the film "Three Heroes" will begin its organizational work in 2021.

The filming of the film was entrusted to the "Spectre studio" film company. The most famous cultural figures of Uzbekistan and Kazakhstan were involved in the film as actors.

The team of film creators was advised by specialists from the Ministry of Internal Affairs of Uzbekistan. They ensured safety on land, on water and in the air using special equipment.

At the same time, in the city of Tashkent, local residents were a little confused during the filming process. Because of this, many buses, cars and road traffic lights were turned on, some of them were in a state of emergency. The Ministry of Internal Affairs and the Film Studio informed mass media that this incident was being carried out by the Film Studio.

== Sound post-production ==
Sound director Aleksey Izvolskiy. Sound design Aleksey Izvolskiy. CineLab sound post-production complex. Dolby Digital 5.1

=== Music ===
The music for the film "Uch Qahramon" was written Aleksey Izvolskiy.

== Awards and nominations ==
Year	Prize	Category	Recipients	Result	Ref.
2024	Oltin humo	Best Cinematography	Azizbek Normatov	Won	
2024	Oltin humo	The best actor	Shoxrux Xamdamov	Nominated	
2024	Oltin humo	The best montage	Timur Kiyasov	Won	
2024	Oltin humo	The best director	Shoxrux Rasulov	Nominated	
2024	Oltin humo	The best movie	Uch qahramon	Nominated	
