= Hot Bread =

2018 film

- Theatrical release poster
- Directed by: Umid Khamdamov
- Written by: Umid Khamdamov
- Starring: Zarina Ergasheva; Feruza Saidova; Munavvara Abdullayeva
- Release date: 18 December 2018 (Tashkent)
- Running time: 87 minutes
- Country: Uzbekistan
- Language: Uzbek

Hot Bread (Uzbek: Issiq non) is a 2018 Uzbekistani drama film directed by Umid Khamdamov. It was selected as the Uzbekistani entry for the Best International Feature Film at the 92nd Academy Awards, but it was not nominated. It was the first time that Uzbekistan had submitted a film for the Best International Feature Film Oscar.

== Plot ==
A teenage girl longs to move away from her village to live with her mother in the city.

== Cast ==
- Zarina Ergasheva as Zulfiya
- Feruza Saidova as Zulfiya's mother
- Munavvara Abdullayeva as Zulfiya's grandmother

== See also ==
- List of submissions to the 92nd Academy Awards for Best International Feature Film
- List of Uzbekistani submissions for the Academy Award for Best International Feature Film
