= Dance in Uzbekistan =

Overview of folk dance traditions in Uzbekistan

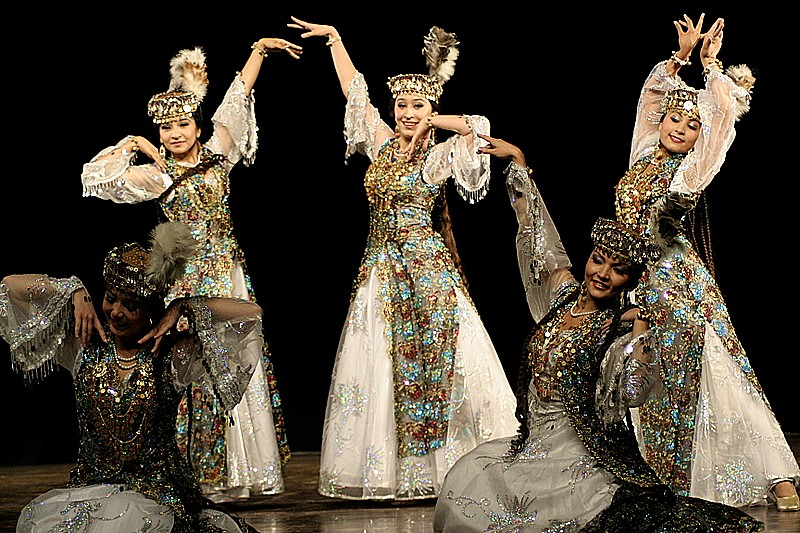
Sabo, Uzbek national dance ensemble

There are three schools of dance in Uzbekistan: Khorezm, Fergana, and Bukhara. Each one has its peculiarities and specific features.

== Khorezm dance ==
Khorezm dance is known for its fiery nature. The most popular style of dance is "Lazgi", which has been included in the Representative List of the Intangible Cultural Heritage of Humanity by the Intergovernmental Committee for the Safeguarding of Intangible Cultural Heritage of UNESCO in 2019. The music consists of an introduction and main body including folk melodies. First, slow and simple dance movements are made with the fingers, wrists, and shoulders, and then the whole body starts to move. The pace accelerates and becomes increasingly energetic. Men and women dance it very differently.

== Fergana dance ==
In contrast to Khorezm, Fergana is fluent and lyrical, with smooth rounded movements of dancers' hands.

== Bukhara dance ==
Bukhara dance is complex and measured. Some local monuments of the early Middle Ages portray this original art and its place in the life and culture of the residents of Bukhara Region.
