= Yondiradi Kuydiradi =

Uzbek film

- Directed by: Bakhrom Yakubov
- Screenplay by: Bakhrom Yakubov
- Produced by: Ruslan Mirzayev
- Starring: Ulugbek Kadirov; Lola Yoʻldosheva; Saida Rametova; Sardor Zoirov; Luiza Rasulova
- Release date: 2011
- Running time: 93 minutes
- Country: Uzbekistan
- Language: Uzbek

External videos
- «Yondiradi Kuydiradi» - official trailer

Yondiradi Kuydiradi is a 2011 Uzbek comedy film directed by Bakhrom Yakubov and produced by Ruslan Mirzayev. The film stars Ulugbek Kadyrov, Saida Rametova and Lola Yoʻldosheva - the brightest examples of Uzbek cinema. Luiza Rasulova played a supporting role in this film. It was after this film and films "O Maryam, Maryam" that the actress became known to the world of cinema.

== Plot ==
An Uzbek comedy, the plot of which revolves around our two main characters. Beautiful Lola, who graduated from a foreign university and returned to her homeland, and about Azamat, a typical Uzbek guy, whose life spends more time on the streets of Tashkent.

== Cast ==
- Ulugbek Kadirov: Azamat
- Lola Yoʻldosheva: Lola
- Saida Rametova: Saodat
- Luiza Rasulova: ?
- Sardor Zoirov: Asatbek
- Elyor Nosirov: Jamshid
- Umid Zokirov: Bekzod
- Feruza Yusupova:

== Sound post-production ==
Sound director Sarvar Karimov. Sound design Donyor Agzamov. CineLab sound post-production complex. Dolby Digital 5.1

=== Music ===
The music for the film "Yondiradi Kuydiradi" was written Donyor Agzamov.
