= 101 Flight =

Uzbek film

- Directed by: Akrom Shohnazarov
- Written by: Akrom Shohnazarov; Shohsanam Sufiyeva
- Produced by: Ravshan Norbayev
- Starring: Hoshim Arslonov; Umid Iskandarov
- Music by: Muinzoda
- Production companies: NA Uzbekkino; Norbayev Pictures
- Release date: 2 June 2022
- Running time: 110 minutes
- Country: Uzbekistan
- Language: Uzbek

101 Flight (Uzbek: 101 Reys) is an Uzbek biographical dramatic film directed by Akrom Shakhnazarov and producer Ravshan Norbaev about flight HY101 and captain Zarif Saidazimov, based on his autobiography about the last flight before retirement.

== Plot ==
In the early morning of September 11, 2001, a Boeing 757 aircraft belonging to Uzbekistan Airways takes off from the Uzbek capital of Tashkent. This is the final flight of Zarif Saidazimov, a highly experienced and veteran pilot, before his retirement. Flight 101 is in transit through Birmingham International Airport in the UK to John F. Kennedy International Airport in New York, USA.

Approaching New York, Captain Saidazimov receives a sudden command from an air traffic controller to divert to a landing at Logan International Airport. The captain announces this change to the passengers and heads for Boston. With only a short distance to the airport, another air traffic controller informs the flight crew that the plane now needs to land at Gander International Airport in Newfoundland, Canada. Captain Saidazimov has no choice but to follow instructions. Warning the cabin crew about the changes, he asks them to keep the passengers calm.

When news of the diversion reaches the passengers, confusion and disbelief ensue with many feeling panicked. As events unfold in the U.S., passengers and crew members alike find themselves in a frightening and uncertain situation.

== Cast ==
- Hoshim Arslonov as chief pilot Zarif Saidazimov
- Umid Iskandarov as co-pilot Botir Makhmudov
- Oleg Galahov as pilot Fyodor Denisov
- Lola Eltoyeva as flight attendant Nigora Yusupova
- Khurshid Tuhtayev as pilot Rashid Nizomov
- Erkin Bozorov as passenger Jahongir
- Bahora Arslonova as stewardess Aziza
- Farhod Abdullayev as passenger Farhod
- Nigina Anarbayeva as stewardess Sevara
- Shokhrullo Abdullaev as passenger Shoxrux
