= Mahallada duv-duv gap =

1960 Uzbek SSR, USSR film

Mahallada duv-duv gap Маҳаллада дув-дув гап
- A screenshot from the movie (in Russian)
- Directed by: Y. Stepchuk
- Written by: O. Razamzonov; B. Rest
- Produced by: Shuhrat Abbosov
- Starring: H. Isʼhoqova; R. Rizamuhamedova; R. Madrahimova; Hamza Umarov; T. Tojiyev; A. Aliyev; L. Sarimsoqova; M. Yoqubova; I. Boltayeva; R. Hamroyev; R. Pirmuhamedov
- Edited by: I. Gordon
- Music by: M. Leviyev
- Production company: Uzbekfilm
- Release date: 1960
- Running time: 80 minutes
- Countries: Uzbek SSR, USSR
- Languages: Uzbek and Russian

Mahallada duv-duv gap (The Talk of the Neighborhood or The Whole Neighborhood is Talking about It) (Uzbek: Mahallada duv-duv gap, Маҳаллада дув-дув гап; Russian: Об этом говорит вся махалля) is a 1960 Soviet black-and-white Uzbek musical comedy. The film was directed by Y. Stepchuk and produced by Shuhrat Abbosov, a prominent Uzbek filmmaker. Mahallada duv-duv gap is considered to be one of the best Uzbek films of all time and Shuhrat Abbosov, who received a National Artist of the USSR award for his works, is celebrated as one of the founders of the Uzbek film making industry.

== Plot ==
The events in Mahallada duv-duv gap occur in a mahalla — a traditional Uzbek neighborhood — in an old part of Tashkent at a time when big-scale construction works are taking place. The movie humorously depicts the relationships between traditional parents and their modern children.

== Script ==
The script for the film was originally written in Russian. However, Shuhrat Abbosov wanted to make the film in Uzbek. Just one day before the start of production, he asked the renowned Uzbek author Abdulla Qahhor to translate the script. Qahhor was in hospital at the time. He translated the dialogues in the script in two hours sitting on a bench in front of the hospital. Abdulla Qahhor is credited as a translator and an editor in the movie.
