= Istanbullik Milliarder =

Uzbek film

- Directed by: Ozod Shams
- Written by: Bahrom Yakubov
- Produced by: Ruslan Mirzayev; Shahrukh Murtazaev
- Starring: Muhammad Iso Abdulhairov; Sitora Alimjanova; Sardor Zoirov; Zuhra Soliyeva; Umid Zokirov; Umid Irgashev; Asqar Hikmatov; Bahshillo Fatullayev
- Music by: Jamshid Gafarov
- Release date: November 29, 2019
- Running time: 84 minutes
- Countries: Uzbekistan; Turkey
- Language: Uzbek

Istanbullik Milliarder (English: Billionaire from Istanbul) — Is a comedy movie, filmed in Istanbul, Turkey by Turkish and Uzbek filmmakers. The characters in the movie were played by Uzbek actors, and the filming was carried out by Turkish and Uzbek cameramen. The movie premiered on November 29, 2019, in Uzbekistan. This film was one of the most watched films in Uzbekistan. The budget and gross earnings of the film have not been announced.

== Cast ==
- Muhammad Iso Abdulhairov: Qobil
- Sitora Alimjanova: Sitora
- Umid Irgashev: Aziz
- Zuhra Soliyeva: Farida
- Asqar Hikmatov : Muzaffar
- Sardor Zoirov : Azizbek
- Umid Zokirov: Umid
- Bahshillo Fatullayev as Erkin
