= Kamara Kamalova =

Uzbek filmmaker

- Камара Камалова
- Born: December 9, 1938; Bukhara
- Occupation: Film director

Kamara Shadmanova Kamalova (Uzbek: Қамара Шодмоновна Камолова, romanized: Qamara Shodmonovna Kamolova; born December 9, 1938) is an Uzbek filmmaker. She has been called "the most celebrated woman film-maker of Central Asia."

Kamara Kamalova was born in Bukhara, the daughter of a philosophy professor and a schoolteacher. After studying physics at Moscow State University, she entered the prestigious All-Union State Institute of Cinematography (VGIK). After graduating in 1964, she worked for Uzbekfilm making animated films, then began making feature films starting with Gorkaya yagoda/Bitter Berry (1975). Most of her films are about children, coming of age stories, or young lovers.

== Filmography ==
- Neobychnoe Prkluchenie (A Remarkable Adventure), 1966 (animated)
- Kto sdelal oblako? (Who Made a Cloud?), 1967 (animated)
- Rakhim I Zhuk (Rakhim anda Beetle), 1967 (animated)
- Poprygunchik (A Fidget), 1968 (animated)
- Gorkaya yagoda/Bitter Berry, 1975
- Chuzhoye shchastye/Other People's Happiness 1978
- Zavtra vyydesh'?/Will You Go Out Tomorrow?, 1980
- Nash vnuk rabotayet v militsii/My Grandson Working in Police 1984
- O tom, chego ne bylo/About the Thing which never happened, 1986
- Dikar/The Savage 1988
- Atrof Qorga Burkandi/All Around Was Covered by Snow 1995
- Jol Budsin/Happy Journey 2006
- Dorogapod Nebesami /The Road Under the Skies, 2006
- Unitma meni/Don't Forget Me, 2014
- Kim deya seni/TheRoad to Nowhere, 2022
