= Meni Sev =

2022 Uzbek TV drama

- Written by: Davron Hidoyatov; Anel Sartaeva; Ilyos Kukanov; Bagrat Arutyunyan
- Directed by: Ikhtiyor Tulyaganov
- Starring: Sardor Nozimov; Mahliyo Asqaraliyeva; Sardor Salyamov; Narminjon; Madina Odilova
- Composers: Ulmas Olloberganov; Jasur Umirov
- Country of origin: Uzbekistan
- Original language: Uzbek
- No. of seasons: 1
- No. of episodes: 12

Production
- Producers: Shahrukh Murtazaev; Bekzod Mirmqxmudov
- Production location: Uzbekistan
- Cinematography: Ixtiyor To'laganov
- Running time: 35–40 minutes
- Production company: Salom Social Media

Original release
- Release: 14 February 2022

Meni Sev (Give me Love) is an Uzbek television drama that aired on Yoshlar TV. Series of 2022 directed by Ikhtiyor Tulaganov. Starring Mahliyo Askaraliyeva and Sardor Nozimov. The series grossed more than 700 million soms at the Uzbek box office.

The premiere of the series will take place in Uzbekistan on February 14, 2022. The world premiere took place on February 20, 2022.

== Plot ==
Anvar and Afruza were engaged by their parents when they were young, and when they grew up, Afruza fell in love with another boy. Despite Afuza's resistance to Anvar's marriage, her parents forced her to marry Anvar. She overcomes many difficulties and falls in love with Anvar.

== Creation ==
Before the start of work on the "Meni Sev" series in Tashkent in September 2021, the scientific and practical conference "Meni Sev: Life and Artistic Incarnation in Films" was held to discuss the ideological interpretation and script of the film.

At the conference, Uzbek scientists and psychologists talked about the character and work of today's youth, the events that happen in the lives of young people and the interpretation of the events that happened.

The filming of the series was carried out by the film company Salom Social Media. The series starred popular Uzbek actors.

The atmosphere of that era lived in the location of the movie Salom. Together with a creative group from Uzbekistan, the city square stage was built on an area of 10 hectares. A model of a multi-storey residential building, 5.5 meters high and with an area of 2,500 square meters, was built in Toshkent, employing 200 workers.

== Cast ==
- Sardor Nozimov — Anvar
- Mahliyo Asqaraliyeva — Afruza
- Sardor Salyamov —Jasur
- Narminjon — Sevara
- Madina Adilova — Malika
- Mirkamol Karabayev — Otabek
- Baxtiyor Musayev
- Zuhra Ashurova
- Abror Yo'ldashev
- Muzaffarbek Mirzabekov

== Awards and nominations ==
- Best camera work of 2022.

== Sound post-production ==
The music for the film "Meni Sev" was written by Anvar Anorkulov. Sound director Jasur Umirov.

Sound post-production complex of the CineLab company Dolby Digital 5.1. Sound design by Bekzod Mirmqxmudov.

=== Soundtrack ===
Meni Sev

Soundtrack album by Ulmas Olloberganov
- Released: 2022
- Recorded: 2022
- Genre: Film soundtrack
- Length: 4:15
- Language: Uzbek
- Label: Fox music

Ulmas Olloberganov chronology
Jasur Umirov (2022)	Meni Sev (2022)	Jasur Umirov (2022)

Jasur Umirov was roped in to compose the original soundtrack and score for Meni Sev.

Jasur Umirov was hired to compose the original soundtrack and music by Meni Sev.
