= 97 modda =

2026 Uzbek TV drama

- Written by: Azim Yuldashev; Elshan Namazly; Rasul Karimov
- Directed by: Abduazim Ilhomjonov
- Starring: Bobur Yuldashev; Feruza Saidova; Mashkhura Zulfikorova; Ulugbek Khalikov; Baurjan Аytbagambetov
- Composer: Elbek Hamdamov
- Country of origin: Uzbekistan
- Original language: Uzbek
- No. of seasons: 1
- No. of episodes: 9

Production
- Producers: Shahrukh Murtazaev; Ixtiyor Baxtiyorov
- Production location: Uzbekistan
- Cinematography: Javohir Turg'unov
- Running time: 30-35 minutes
- Production company: Salom TV

Original release
- Release: 5 December 2025

97 modda (Article 97) is an Uzbek television drama that aired on Salom TV. Series of 2025 directed by Abduazim Ilhomjonov. Starring Bobur Yuldashev and Feruza Saidova. The series grossed more than 700 million soms at the Uzbek box office.

The premiere of the series will take place in Uzbekistan on December 3, 2025. The world premiere took place on December 5, 2025.

== Plot ==
Before retiring, an investigator takes on a final case. A crime mystery about the twists and turns of fate.

Lieutenant Colonel Ergash, who is due to retire soon, investigates the murder of his daughter and uncovers evidence that reminds him of a personal tragedy. In his search for the truth, he faces a choice between personal pain and responsibility to society.

== Cast ==
- Bobur Yuldashev as Ergash Sayidov
- Feruza Saidova as Lobar
- Mashkhura Zulfikorova as
- Ulugbek Khalikov as
- Baurjan Аytbagambetov as
- Mohlaroy Sobirova as
- Ganisher Raxmatillaev as
- Sanjar Sattorov as Donyor Murodov

== Sound post-production ==
The music for the film "97 modda" was written by Elbek Hamdamov. Sound director Ulugʻbek Yulchiyev.

Sound post-production complex of the CineLab company Dolby Digital 5.1. Sound design by Dilshod Allayorov.

=== Soundtrack ===
97 modda

Soundtrack album by Ulugʻbek Yulchiyev
- Released: 2026
- Recorded: 2026
- Genre: Film soundtrack
- Length: 4:15
- Language: Uzbek
- Label: Fox music

Ulugʻbek Yulchiyev chronology
Elbek Hamdamov (2026)	97 modda (2026)	Elbek Hamdamov (2026)

Ulugʻbek Yulchiyev was roped in to compose the original soundtrack and score for 97 modda.

Ulugʻbek Yulchiyev was hired to compose the original soundtrack and music by 97 modda.
