= Umid Iskandarov =

Film director, Actor, Producer

- Born: Umidjon Iskanderov Kurbanaliyevich; September 24, 1980 (age 46)
- Origin: Tashkent, Uzbek SSR, USSR
- Occupations: Actor and film director
- Years active: 2005–present

Umid Iskandarov (sometimes spelled Umidjon Iskanderov in English) (Uzbek: Umid Iskandarov, Умид Искандаров, (born September 24, 1980) — Uzbek actor and film director.

Umid Iskandarov started his professional career as an actor in 2005. Iskandarov made his first movie with "Tuzoq" in 2008 and has starred in many movies since then.

== Life ==
Umid Iskandarov was born on September 24, 1980, in Tashkent in a creative family. In 2009 he studied at the Tashkent State Institute of Arts named after Mannon Uyghur. He was a student at the Faculty of Television and Radio Directing. Today, he continues his creative career as an actor. He has been appearing in commercials, music videos and shows since 2005. In 2011 he received the award "Best Young Actor of the Year" in Uzbekistan. Umid Iskandarov became widely known in Uzbekistan in 2010 after starring in the Uzbek drama "O’yin ichida o’yin".

=== Family ===
- Father: Qurbonali Maqsudxonzoda Iskandariy was born 1952 in Tashkent.
- Mother: Sanoatxon Iskandarova was born 1957 in Tashkent.
- Brother: Muhammad Ali Iskandarov Qurbonalievich was born 1983 in Tashkent.
- Brother: Anvar Iskandarov Qurbonalievich was born 1985 in Tashkent.
- Wife: The actor married Renata Iskandarova in 2009. But they divorced in 2015.

== Filmography ==
=== Film ===
Below is a chronologically ordered list of films in which Umid Iskandarov has appeared.

Year	Film	Role	Ref
2008	Tuzoq	Muzrap	
2008	Qasd		
2009	Arzanda		
2009	Qaroqchilar		
2009	Xayotim Orzusi		
2010	O'yin ichida o'yin		
2010	Burilish		
2010	Kuzning songi notasi		
2011	Ming bir jon		
2011	Hiyonat		
2011	Oqibat	Shohrux	
2011	Nafs		
2012	OSuper qaynona	Anvar	
2012	Janob qorovul	Farruh	
2012	O'jar kelin	Dilnoza's husband	
2012	Yollangan Sovchi	Akbar	
2012	Oqibat 2	Shohrux	
2012	Xay xay qizaloq	Holida's husband	
2012	Aldangan Ko'ngil	Farhod	
2013	Sabr	Jamshid	
2013	Xasta		
2013	"Fotima va Zuxra 2"	Shoxrux	
2013	Lavz		
2013	Qo'chqor akani koptogi	Umid	
2013	Faryod 2		
2013	Qudamni ko'rmadingizmi	reporter	
2014	Zarb	O'lmas	
2014	Farhod va Shirin	Farhod	
2014	Yetti olam		
2015	Ayg'og'chi kampir	Davron	
2015	Men Toshkentni sevaman		
2015	Telba emasman		
2017	Hamroh		
2012–2021	Ishq va andux ogushida		
2021	101 Flight	co-pilot Botir Makhmudov	
2023	Patience (Sabr)		
2025	Marjona		

=== Miniseries ===
Year	Miniseries	Role	Ref
2021	Ayol Qasosi		
2021	The Bestchefuz		
2021	Bardosh		

=== Music videos ===
Year	Title	Artist	Role
2006	Yor-yor	G'ayrat Usmonov	Actor
2007	Muhabbat	G'ayrat Usmonov	Actor
2007	Bahor kelsa	Jamshid Abduazimov	Actor
2012	Kuzning so'ngi no'tasi	Asal Shodieva	Actor
2012	Qaniydi	Zamzama	Actor
2013	Bevafo yor	Botir Yaminov	Actor
2013	Chaqaloqlar	Ulug'bek Rahmatullayev	Actor
2014	Devonalarmız	Yulduz Usmonova	Actor
2014	Begim sog'inasiz	Dilso'z	Actor
2015	Masxaraboz	Radio	Actor
2015	Hayotım	Manzura	Actor
2015	Yomondan	Botir Yaminov	Actor
2017	Istadingmu	Shohjahon Jo'rayev	Actor
2018	Armondan so'ra	Rayhon	Actor
2018	101	Parizoda	Actor
2018	Oq gulim	Ummon	Actor
2019	Nega sendan kechib bo'lmaydi	Xurshid Rasulov	Actor
2019	Ovora	Milena Madmusayeva	Actor
2019	Ota duası	Shaxriyor	Actor
2019	Qaytmayman	Lola Yo'ldosheva	Actor
2019	Ona faryodi	Dildora Niyozova	Actor
2020	Самый лучший день (cover version)	Умид Искандаров и Prime band	Actor
2021	Erkak bo'l	O'ktam Kamalov	Actor
2021	Jigarlar	O'ktam Kamalov	Actor
2021	Bemorman	Mango guruhi	Actor
2021	Opa singillar	Jasurbek Mavlonov	Actor
2021	Taqdirim	Nilufar Usmonova	Actor
2022	Sevmaganimda	Ulug'bek Raxmatullayev	Actor
2022	Yomg'ir	Ozoda Nursaidova	Actor
