= 2000 Songs of Farida =

2020 film

- Theatrical release poster
- Directed by: Yalkin Tuychiev
- Written by: Yalkin Tuychiev
- Produced by: Shavkat Rizaev: Doniyor Agzamov
- Starring: Sanobar Haqnazarova; Bahrom Matchanov; Ilmira Rahimjanova; Yulduz Rajabova; Marjona Uljayeva
- Cinematography: Bahadir Yuldashev
- Edited by: Hurshid Alihodjaev
- Production company: Fox Music Cinema
- Distributed by: Fox Music Cinema
- Release date: 9 October 2020 (Busan)
- Running time: 110 minutes
- Country: Uzbekistan
- Language: Uzbek

2000 Songs of Farida (Uzbek: Faridaning ikki ming qoʻshigʻi), also translated as Farida's 2000 Songs, is a 2020 Uzbekistani drama film directed by Yalkin Tuychiev. It is set in Central Asia in 1920.

The film premiered at the Adelaide Film Festival on 17 October 2020, and was shown a couple of weeks later at the 2020 Busan International Film Festival. It was selected as the Uzbekistani entry for the Best International Feature Film at the 93rd Academy Awards, but was disqualified owing to the correct format of the film not being submitted by the deadline. However, it was resubmitted for the following year.

== Plot ==
The film is set in a rural location in Central Asia (present-day Uzbekistan) during the civil war following the 1917 Russian Revolution, which spread into the Russian colonies in the region. Set in 1920, the Bolshevik forces are closing in, close to victory in taking over the republic.

The story centres on a landowner in a rural location, who already has three wives, and has his life disrupted when a fourth wife arrives at his home. He has married the new, younger wife because his other wives had not produced an heir for him, but he treats his wives poorly, and the women forge close relationships among themselves. The coming of the Bolsheviks means that women's roles in society will change.

== Crew ==
- Director: Yalkin Tuychiev
- Producer: Shavkat Rizaev, Doniyor Agzamov
- Writer: Yalkin Tuychiev
- Cinematography: Bahadir Yuldashev
- Editing: Hurshid Alihodjaev
- Costume designer: Shamshetdin Ibraymov

== Cast ==
- Sanobar Haqnazarova as Kamil's wife
- Bahrom Matchanov as Kamil
- Ilmira Rahimjanova as Kamil's wife
- Yulduz Rajabova as Kamil's wife
- Marjona Uljayeva as Kamil's wife

== Themes ==
One reviewer described the film as "a story about the changes in local women’s lives under patriarchy and the war going on around them. Using the example of one local family, the film analyzes how the historical events of the beginning of the last century in Turkestan, affected the life of the population of this region".

The director said "This film is neither a historical decoration nor a museum exhibition,... but the exploration of a real-life, real people, their reality, dignity and truth... that gets over the borders of history, mentality, nationality and race in order to reach a real sense of humaneness".

World Film Reviews called it a "deceptively clever film", with the final 20 minutes particularly exciting.

== Production ==
2000 Songs of Farida was directed by Yalkin Tuychiev, a director from Tashkent, born in 1977 when Uzbekistan was still a Soviet Republic, whose earlier films had been selected for international film festivals before. It was produced by Shavkat Rizayev.

Called Faridaning ikki ming qoʻshigʻi in the Uzbek language, the film title has also been translated as Farida's 2000 Songs. The film makes use of long takes, showing the dry and rural landscape around the house where all of the action takes place.

== Release ==
The film premiered at the Adelaide Film Festival on 17 October 2020, and was also selected for the 2020 Busan International Film Festival, where it was shown a couple of weeks later.

Its German premiere was at the GoEast festival, based in Wiesbaden but much of it online, in April 2021, and it was shown at the 6th Ulju Mountain Film Festival, a film festival held in the Yeongnam Alps in South Korea dedicated to films about mountains and mountaineering. It was listed as the first of twelve films not to be missed at the festival.

== Reception ==
The film was submitted for the Golden Globes in 2020, but was not nominated. The website reviewer called it a rare film:

It was selected as the Uzbekistani entry for the Best International Feature Film at the 93rd Academy Awards. However, the film was disqualified, because the Uzbek Film Commission did not submit the required format of the film to the academy in time. It was resubmitted for the following year.

At the 6th edition of the annual Asian World Film Festival in Los Angeles in 2021, 2000 Songs of Farida won the Snow Leopard Audience Award.

== See also ==
- List of submissions to the 93rd Academy Awards for Best International Feature Film
- List of submissions to the 94th Academy Awards for Best International Feature Film
- List of Uzbekistani submissions for the Academy Award for Best International Feature Film
