= Ulugʻbek Qodirov =

Uzbek actor (born 1983)

- Born: Ulugbek Nasirovich Kadirov; Uzbek: Улугбек Насирович Кадиров; August 3, 1983 (age 43); Tashkent, Uzbek SSR, USSR
- Occupation: Actor
- Years active: 2001–present
- Children: 3
- Awards: Order of Friendship

Ulugbek Nasirovich Kadirov (Uzbek: Улугбек Насирович Кадиров) (born August 3, 1983) is an Uzbek Actor.

== Life ==
Ulugbek Kadirov was born on August 3, 1983, in Tashkent, the capital of Uzbekistan. He graduated from school number 34 in Tashkent. He also graduated from the Art Institute of Uzbekistan. In 2005, he received the "Best Young Actor of the Year" award in Uzbekistan. Ulugbek Kadirov gained wide recognition and fame in Uzbekistan in 2009 after starring in the Uzbek drama film "Shabbona".

Today, the actor lives and works in the USA. One of the films that brought the actor the most popularity was the 2016 film Baron. This film was recognized as the film that opened new pages in Uzbek cinema. In addition, the film "Traitor", dedicated to the events in Andijan in 2005, brought a great reputation to the actor.

=== Family ===
- Father: Nasir Kadirov
- Mother: Farida Kadirova
- Brother: Islombek Kadirov Nasirovich
- Sister: Feruza Kadirova Nasirovna
- Sister: Aziza Kadirova Nasirovna
- Sister: Dilfuza Kadirova Nasirovna
- Wife: Azizaxon Kadirova

==== Children ====
- Imona Kadirova Ulugbekovna April 1, 2014.
- Amirbek Kadirov Ulugbekovich July 21, 2016.
- Zubayda Kadirova Ulugbekovna September 13, 2021

== Filmography ==
Below is a chronologically ordered list of films in which Ulugbek Kadirov has appeared.

Year	Film	Role	Ref
200...	Akademiya		
200...	Shayton bilan oʻynashma		
2004	Devona	Shodi	
2004	Sarvinoz	Odil	
2005	Baxt uchun million	Odil	
2005	Oʻyin	Jamshid	
2006	Fotima va Zuhra	Shohrux	
2006	Shabbona	Bahrom	
2007	Sevginator	Akmal	
2007	Jazo	Jasur	
2007	Panoh	Elyor	
2008	Shabnam	Bobur	
2008	Iztirob	Ruslan	
2008	Telba	Rustam	
2008	Oshiqlar	Yodgor	
2010	Oʻgʻrigina kelin	Jasur	
2010	Sevginator 2: Qaynona operatsiyasi	Akmal	
2010	Majruh	Farrux	
2010	Dada	Zafar	
2011	Hur qiz	?	
2011	Nafs	Ulugbek	
2011	Qasos	Bahrom	
2011	Er bermoq — jon bermoq	Otabek	
2011	Yondiradi Kuydiradi	Azamat	
2011	Jodugar	Farxod	
2012	Jannatdagi boʻri bolasi	?	
2012	Men yulduzman	?	
2012	O Maryam, Maryam	?	
2012	Akajon xizmatingizdamiz	Shuhrat	
2013	Panjara	?	
2013	O’lim farishtasi	?	
2013	Rashk	Otabek	
2013	Oʻkinch	Sherzod	
2013	Arslon izidan	?	
2014	Gunoh	Azamat	
2014	Erkatoy	Jamol	
2014	Sotqin	?	
2015	Aka	?	
2015	Baron	Botir (Chempon)	
2015	Majnun	Majnun	
2018	Sarvqomat dilbarim	Baytemir	
2019	Sniper (2019 film)	Yunusbek	
2023	Uch Qahramon		
2025	Kazbek	Kazbem (Mamadali Topivoldiyev)	
2025	Azartnik	?	

=== TV serials ===
Year	Title	Role
2000	Akademiya	
2016	Sodat	
2022	Yur Muhabbat	Umar
2023-2024	Alfons	Sadiy Sadullayevich

=== Music videos ===
Year	Title	Artist	Role
2002	Zuxrom kelmadi	Abdurashid Yuldashev	Actor
2004	Ne bo’ldi	Sevich Mo’minova	Actor
2005	Hamon yuragimda	Bunyod	Actor
2016	Ket	Shahzoda feat. Shoxrux	Actor
2017	Yomgʻir	Shahzoda	Actor

=== Advertising ===
Year	Company/product
2006	To'xtaniyoz ota
2006	Ucell
2016	Ucell
2023–2024	InBazar
2024–present	Iskander Buildings
2025	Adamari
2025	Dinay

== Discography ==
=== Album ===
- Xoxlasang agar (2015)

=== Solos and duets ===
- Oʻlganiz yoʻq (duet with Uktam Kamalov 2024)
- Onajon (2025)
- Moxigul (2026)
- Ot dushi (2026)
- Bu yoʻllar(2026)
- Baurim (duet with Abdizhappar Alkozha 2026)
- Toʻy jura (2026)
- Xonimey (2026)
- Doʻst deb (2026)
- Jigarimsan (2026)
- Do‘st ekan (duet with Ulugʻbek Yulchiyev 2026)

== Awards ==
- Order of Friendship (2026)

Year	Premium	Film	Nomination	Result	Source
2005	Actor of the Year	Fotima and Zuhra	"Best Young Actor of the Year"	Won	
2008	M&TVA	Telba	“Best Actor of 2008”	Won	
2026	"Lendoc Film Festival — LEFF"	Kazbek	"Best Actor"	Won	
