= Ruslan Mirzayev =

Uzbek film producer

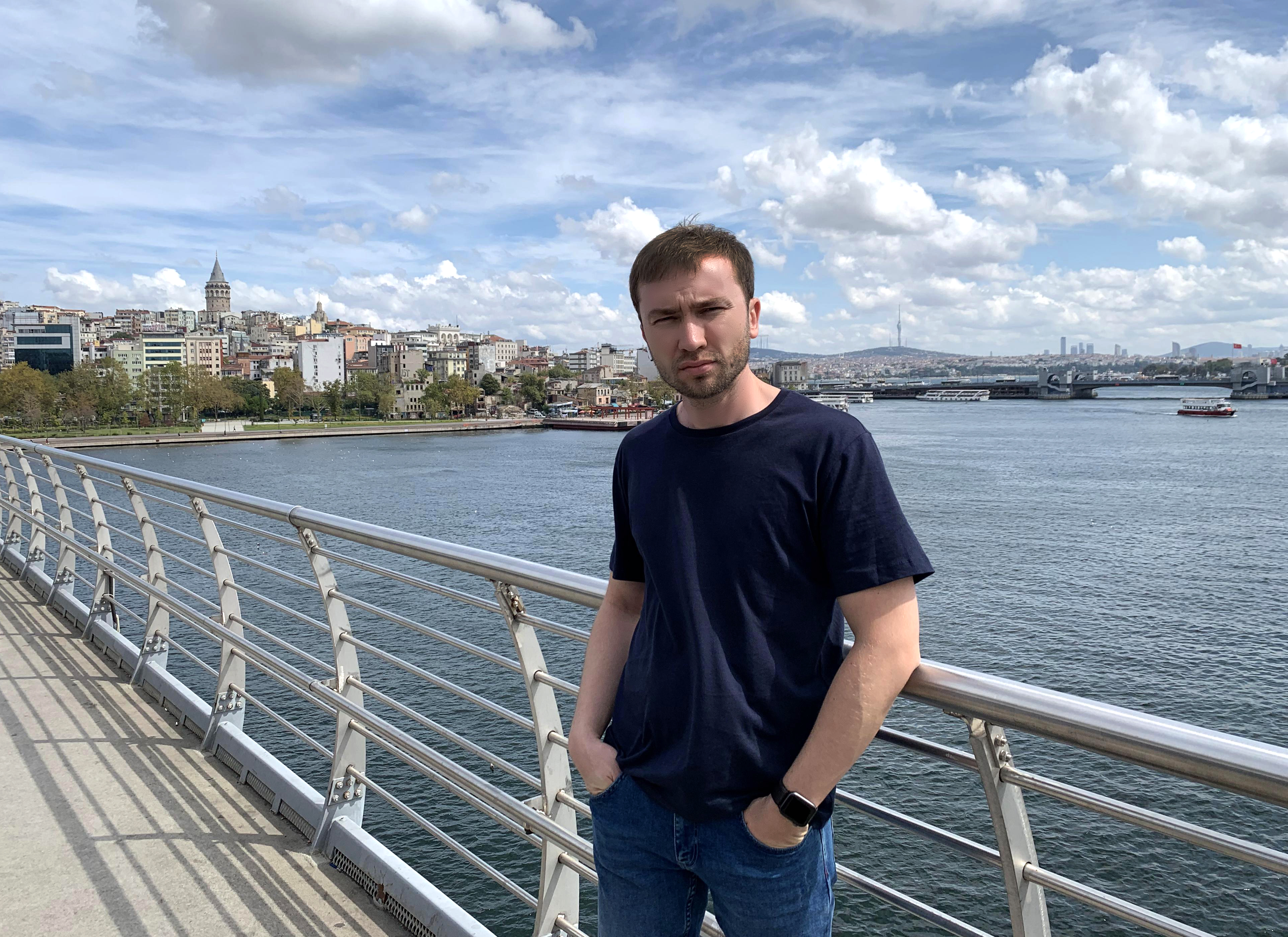
- Born: Mirzayev Ruslan Ozodovich; March 30, 1989 (age 36); Gomel, Belarus SSR, Soviet Union
- Citizenship: Uzbekistan
- Education: Uzbek State Institute of Arts and Culture
- Occupations: Film producer; Director
- Years active: 2011–present
- Notable work: Sniper
- Style: comedy, drama, melodrama
- Spouse: Nozima Mirzayeva (2020)

Ruslan Mirzayev (Uzbek: Ruslan Mirzayev, Russian: Руслан Мирзаев) (born March 30, 1989) is an Uzbek film producer and director. Mirzayev began his film production career in 2011 by shooting the film Yondiradi Kuydiradi.

== Life ==
Ruslan Mirzayev was born on March 30, 1989, in Gomel, Belarus SSR, Soviet Union. He studied cinematography at the College of Cinema, Video and Technology. After graduating from college, he studied at the Faculty of Cinematography of the Uzbek State Institute of Arts and Culture. He began his film production career in 2011 by shooting the film Yondiradi Kuydiradi. He is best known in the movie world through his film Sniper.

== Career activities ==
=== Collaboration with Turkish filmmakers ===
The collaboration with Turkish filmmakers began with the shooting of Sniper. The film was directed by Ozod Shams and produced by Ruslan Mirzayev, starring Uzbek and Turkish actors. After that, there were rumors on the Internet that a film called My Sun (Güneşim benim) would be shot in collaboration with the Turks, and that the film could receive high ratings. However, shortly afterwards, the film's producer, Ruslan Mirzayev, announced that they had not been able to raise enough money to make the film and began filming the series Battle of the Hearts (Yuraklar jangi) instead. Then, under the leadership of Mirzayev, the team began filming the series Games of Love in collaboration with the screenwriter of the film Valley of the Wolves. After that, Ruslan Mirzayev began working with the Turks on the film Billionaire from Istanbul.

== Filmography ==
Below is a chronologically ordered list of films in which Ruslan Mirzayev has appeared.

=== As a film producer ===
Year	Film	Source
2011	Yondiradi – kuydiradi	
2011	Jodugar (film) (Sorcerer)	
2012	Men yulduzman (I am a star)	
2014	Xiyonat girdobi (The whirlpool of betrayal)	
2014	Tungi mehmon (Night guest)	
2015	Koʻz yoshim (My tears)	
2015	Farxod va Shirin (Farhod and Shirin)	
2015	7 olam (7 worlds)	
2015	Qochqin (film) (Refugee)	
2016	Vaxshiy (Wild)	
2016	Boyvachacha kuyov (The rich groom)	
2017	Sevadi, sevmaydi (Loves, doesn't love)	
2017	Majruh 2	
2018	Egizak oshiqlar (Twin lovers)	
2018	Istanbullik milliarder (Billionaire from Istanbul)	
2019	Snayper (Sniper)	

==== Series ====
Year	Film	Source
2016	Doʻkonda (In the shop)	
2018	Yuraklar jangi (Battle of the Hearts)	
2020	Ishq oʻyinlari (Games of Love)	
2021	Qoʻrqma yural	
2022	Yur Muhabbat	

=== As director ===
Year	Film	Source
2016	Doʻkonda (In the shop)	
2016	Taqdir hazili (The joke of fate)	
2017	Hech kim bilmasin (Let no one know)	

=== As actor ===
Year	Film	Source
2012	Men yulduzman (I am a star)	
2018	Yuraklar jangi	
