= Uzbekistan State Institute of Arts and Culture =

Higher education institution in Tashkent, Uzbekistan

- Ўзбекистон Давлат санъат ва маданият институти
- Established: 1945
- Rector: Bakhtier Sayfullaev
- Location: Tashkent, Uzbekistan
- Website: dsmi.uz/en/home

Uzbekistan State Institute of Arts and Culture (UzSIAC), based on the original Ostrovsky Institute and created by merging the Uzbekistan Institute of Arts and Tashkent State Institute of Culture in 2012, is a state-run higher education institution in Tashkent, Uzbekistan. It is Central Asia’s major training school in the fields of cinema, television, theatre and design.

== History ==
The institute was founded in June 1945 as theatre and artistic art institute named after Alexander Ostrovsky, with the aim of creating a training centre for theatre for the Central Asian Republics, which included the former Soviet Union states of Uzbekistan, Kazakhstan, Kyrgyzstan, Turkmenistan, Tajikistan and Karakalpakstan. The Uzbekistan State institute of Arts and Culture was established on 4 June 2012 by the presidential decree, merging the Uzbekistan Institute of Arts and the Tashkent State Institute of Culture, which was named after Abdullah Kadiri (Kadiri Institute?).

== Description ==
There are more than 1600 students enrolled at both bachelor and master level; and 225 teaching staff providing tuition in both visual arts and performing arts (including cinema).

The institute consists of 3 faculties:

- Dramatic art
- Art of film, television and radio
- Folk art

== Notable alumni ==
- Timur Bekmambetov, (born 1961), Russian-Kazakh filmmaker
- Andrei Boltnev, (1946–1995), Russian actor
- Leonid Bronevoy, (1928–2017), Russian actor
- Sitora Farmonova, (born 1984), Uzbek film actress
- Sairam Isaeva (born 1942), Tajik actress
- Galiya Izmaylova, (1923–2010), Uzbek ballerina
- Oydin Norboyeva, (born 1944), Uzbek actress
- Alvina Shpady, (1935–2019), Uzbek artist and restorer
- Yalkin Tuychiev, (born 1977), Uzbek film director
