= List of Uzbekistani film actors =

This is a list of notable actors from the Uzbek SSR and Uzbekistan.

(Persons are listed alphabetically by their first name.)

== A ==
- Aleksandr Abdulov
- Ali Hamroyev
- Alisher Uzoqov
- Asal Shodiyeva
- Adiz Radjabov
- Azmat Axrorov
- Aziz Rametov

== B ==
- Baxtiyor Ixtiyorov
- Bohodir Yuldashev

== D ==
- Dilnoza Kubayeva
- Diyor Mahkamov
- D.Ditto
- Dilmurod Agzamov

== E ==
- Ergash Karimov
- Elbek Fayziyev

== F ==
- Feruza Jumaniyozova
- Feruza Normatova

== J ==
- Jamshid Zokirov
- Jamshid Abdazimov

== L ==
- Lola Yoʻldosheva

== M ==
- Melis Abzalov
- Mömin Rizo
- Matyoqub Matjonov
- Miyassar Berdiqulova
- Mirza Azizov
- Mirzabek Xolmedov
- Murod Rajabov

== N ==
- Nodirbek Primqulov

== O ==
- Otabek Mahkamov
- Otabek Madraximov
- Otanek Mutalxojayev
- Obid Asomov
- Obid Yunusov

== P ==
- Park Solomon

== R ==
- Rayhon Gʻaniyeva
- Ravshana Kurkova
- Rano Shodiyeva
- Ravshan Sobirov

== S ==
- Shahzoda
- Sherali Joʻrayev
- Shirin Abdullaeva
- Shohruhxon
- Shohjohon Joʻrayev
- Shuhrat Abbosov
- Shukur Burxonov
- Sitora Farmonova

== T ==
- Tohir Sodiqov

== U ==
- Ulugʻbek Qodirov
- Umid Iskandarov
- Umid Irgashev
- Ulugʻbek Yulchiyev

== Y ==
- Yefim Bronfman
- Yoʻldosh Aʼzamov
- Yulduz Usmonova

== Z ==
- Ziyoda Qobilova
- Zoxirshox Joʻrayev

== See also ==
- Uzbekistan
- List of Uzbekistan films
- List of Uzbekistan people
