= List of Uzbekistan people =

The following is a list of notable and historically significant people from Uzbekistan.

== Historical figures ==
- Amir Timur – (1320-1408) military commander and statesman
- Alisher Navoi – (1441–1501) poet and philosopher
- Muhammad al-Khwarizmi – (780-850) one of the founders of algebra
- Abu Ali ibn Sina (Avicenna) – (980–1037) physician and philosopher
- Muhammad al-Bukhari – (810–870)
- Abu Rayhan al-Biruni – (973-1048) polymath and scholar
- Mirzo Ulugbek – (1394–1449) astronomer
- Zahiriddin Muhammad Babur – (1526-1530) statesman and poet

== Politicians ==
- Islam Karimov – (1938–2016) First President of Uzbekistan
- Shavkat Mirziyoyev – (born 1957) President of Uzbekistan

== Religious ==
- Ziyauddinkhan ibn Ishan Babakhan – (1908–1982)
- Muhammad Sadik Muhammad Yusuf – (1952–2015)

== Businesspeople ==
- Alisher Usmanov – (born 1953) businessman
- Jakhongir Artikkhodjayev – (born 1975) businessman
- Zafar Khoshimov – (born 1968) businessman
- Murod Nazarov – (born 1980) businessman

== Musicians ==
- Botir Zokirov – (1936–1985) singer
- Ozodbek Nazarvekov – (born 1974) Minister of Culture of Uzbekistan and singer
- Farrukh Zokirov – (born 1946) singer
- Sherali Joʻrayev – (1947–2023) singer
- Yulduz Usmanova – (born 1963) singer
- Tohir Sodiqov – (born 1973) singer
- Sevara Nazarkhan – (born 1976) singer
- Shahzoda – (born 1979) singer
- Khamdam Sobirov – (born 1989) singer
- Ozoda Nursaidova – (born 1974) singer
- Ulugʻbek Yulchiyev – (born 1989) singer
- Sagdiyana – (born 1984) singer

== Sports ==
- Oksana Chusovitina – (born 1975) gymnast
- Murod Khanturaev – (1987–2021) mixed martial artist
- Nursulton Ruziboev – (born 1993) mixed martial artist (UFC)
- Makhmud Muradov – (born 1990) mixed martial artist

=== Football ===
- Ravshan Irmatov – (born 1977) football referee
- Abdukodir Khusanov – (born 2004), football player
- Eldor Shomurodov – (born 1995), football player
- Abbosbek Fayzullaev – (born 2003), football player
- Odil Ahmedov – (born 1978), football player

=== Boxers ===
- Rufat Riskiyev – (1949–2026) boxer
- Ruslan Chagaev – (born 1978) boxer
- Hasanboy Dusmatov – (born 1993) boxer
- Bakhodir Jalolov – (born 1994) boxer
- Israil Madrimov – (born 1995) boxer
- Murodjon Akhmadaliev – (born 1994) boxer

=== Chess players ===
- Rustam Qosimjonov – (born 1979) Chess prodigy
- Nodirbek Abdusattorov – (born 2004) Chess prodigy
- Javohir Sindarov – (born 2005) Chess prodigy

== Actors and directors ==
=== Actors ===
- Ulugʻbek Qodirov – (born 1983) actor
- Yodgor Saʼdiyev – (born 1946) actor
- Rihsitilla Abdullaev – (born 1978) actor
- Erkin Komilov – (born 1946) actor
- Murod Rajabov (born 1949) actor
- Alisher Uzoqov (born 1984) actor
- Farhod Maxmudov – (born 1972) actor

== Writers ==
- Ekin Vohidov – (1936–2016) poet, playwright, literary translator, and statesman
- Abdulla Oripov – (1941–2016) poet and politician

== See also ==
- Uzbekistan
- List of Uzbekistani film actors
