= Yuldashev =

Yuldashev or Yoʻldoshev (Cyrillic: Юлдашев, also Йўлдошев) is the surname of the following persons:

- Akram Yuldashev (1963–2010/2011), founder of Akromiya, an Islamist organization operating in Uzbekistan
- Daniyar Yuldashev (born 1996), Kazakhstani karate fighter
- Dilshod Yuldashev (born 1976), Uzbekistani boxer
- Ibrokhimkhalil Yuldashev (born 2001), Uzbekistani footballer
- Muhammad Ali Yuldashev (born 1991), Uzbek actor, screenwriter, producer and singer
- Nigmatilla Yuldashev (born 1962), Uzbek lawyer and politician
- Ramil Yuldashev (born 1961), Soviet and Ukrainian ice hockey winger
- Shohruxxon, (born in 1985 as Shohrux Yoʻldoshev), Uzbek actor and singer
- Takhir Yuldashev (1967–2009), Uzbek Islamist militant, cofounder of the Islamic Movement of Uzbekistan
- Tolibboy Yuldashev (born 2003), Uzbekistani Paralympic athlete
- Ulugbek Yuldashev (born 1985), entrepreneur from Kyrgyzstan
