= List of Uzbekistani films =

This is a list of films produced in the Uzbek SSR and Uzbekistan. Some of the films made during Soviet times were released in Russian and others were released in Uzbek. Still others were released both in Uzbek and Russian.

Films in this list are arranged according to their original title. If a film was released both in Uzbek and Russian, both titles are given. At the end of each entry is an unofficial English translation of the original title.

== Uzbek films ==
=== Films of the Soviet era ===
==== 1930s ====
- Клыч (Klych) (1935)

==== 1940s ====
- Узбекский киноконцерт (Uzbek Cinema and Concert) (1941)
- Tohir va Zuhra (Tohir and Zuhra) (1945)
- Alisher Navoiy (Ali-Shir Nava'i) (1947)

==== 1950s ====
- Во имя счастья (In the Name of Happiness) (1956)
- Abu Ali ibn Sino (Avicenna) (1957)
- Рыбаки Арала (The Fishers of the Aral) (1957)
- Maftuningman (Delighted by You) (1958)
- Furqat (Furqat) (1959)

==== 1960s ====
- Mahallada duv-duv gap (The Whole Neighborhood is Talking about It) (1960)
- Маленькие истории о детях, которые... (Short Stories about Children Who...) (1961)
- Отвергнутая невеста (The Rejected Bride) (1961)
- Salom, Bahor! (Hello, Spring!) (1962)
- Sen yetim emassan (You are Not an Orphan) (1962)
- Дорога за горизонт (A Road Beyond the Horizon) (1963)
- Пятеро из Ферганы (Five from Ferghana) (1963)
- Yor-yor (Yor-yor) (1964)
- Любит - не любит?/Первое признание (Does He/She Love or Not?/The First Confession) (1964)
- Osiyo ustida boʻron (A Storm above Asia) (1965)
- Листок из блокнота (A Page from a Notebook) (1965)
- Прозрение (Enlightenment) (1965)
- Белые, белые аисты (The White Storks) (1966)
- Колокол Саята (The Bell of Sayat) (1966)
- Круг (The Circle) (1966)
- Формула радуги (The Formula of a Rainbow) (1966)
- Dilbarim (My Darling) (1967)
- Dilorom (Dilorom) (1967)
- Toshkent — non shahri (Ташкент — город хлебный) (Tashkent — A City of Bread) (1967)
- Бабушка пяти тысяч внуков (The Grandmother of Five Thousand Grandchildren) (1967)
- Нежность (Tenderness) (1967)
- Ikki qalb navosi (The Melody of Two Hearts) (1968)
- Красные пески (The Red Sands) (1968)
- Oʻtgan kunlar (Days Gone By) (1969)
- Влюбленные (The Lovers) (1969)
- Внимание, цунами! (Attention, Tsunami!) (1969)
- Опасные гастроли (Dangerous Tours) (1969)
- Улица тринадцати тополей (The Street with Thirteen Poplars) (1969)

==== 1970s ====
- Qora konsul oʻlimi (Russian: Чрезвычайный комиссар) (The Extraordinary Commissar) (1970)
- Без страха (Fearless) (1971)
- Горячие тропы (The Hot Paths) (1971)
- Дерзость (Impudence) (1971)
- Драма любви (A Love Drama) (1971)
- Ленин и Туркестан (Lenin and Turkestan) (1971)
- Седьмая пуля (The Seventh Bullet) (1972)
- Uchrashuv (The Meeting) (1972)
- Встречи и расставания (Meetings and Partings) (1973)
- Побег из тьмы (The Escape from Darkness) (1973)
- Поклонник (The Worshiper) (1973)
- Чинара (The Chinar) (1973)
- Abu Rayhon Beruniy (Russian: Абу Райхан Беруни) (Abū Rayḥān Bīrūnī ) (1974)
- Узбекистан и Ленин (Uzbekistan and Lenin) (1974)
- Ты, песня моя (You, My Song) (1975)
- Человек уходит за птицами (The Man is after Birds) (1975)
- Годы братства и испытаний. Узбекистан 1941-1945 (The Years of Brotherhood and Trials. Uzbekistan in 1941-1945) (1976)
- Далекие близкие годы (Far, Near Years) (1976)
- Птицы наших надежд (The Birds of Our Hopes) (1976)
- Ради других (For Others) (1976)
- Shum Bola (Russian: Озорник) (The Mischievous Boy) (1977)
- Буйный Лебедь (The Wild Swan (1977)
- Транссибирский экспресс (Trans-Siberian Express) (1977)
- Это было в Коканде (This was in Kokand) (1977)
- Toʻylar muborak (Happy Wedding!) (1978)
- Д'Артаньян и три мушкетёра (D'Artagnan and Three Musketeers) (1978)
- Огненные дороги (Fiery Roads) (1978) (Series)
  - Сердце поэта (A Poet's Heart) (1978) (Episodes 1–4)
  - В поисках истины (In Search of the Truth) (1979) (Episodes 5–8)
  - Певец революции (The Singer of the Revolution) (1982) (Episodes 9–12)
  - Борющийся Туркестан (Fighting Turkestan) (1984) (Episodes 13–14)
  - Моя республика (My Republic) (1984) (Episodes 15–17)
- Триптих (Triptych) (1978)
- Chinor tagidagi duel (Russian: Дуэль под чинарой) (A Duel under a Plane Tree) (1979)
- Телохранитель (The Bodyguard) (1979)
- Ах, водевиль, водевиль... (Ah, Vaudeville, Vaudeville ...) (1979)
- Отцовский наказ (A Father's Order) (1979)
- Подготовка к экзамену (Preparation to the Exam) (1979)
- Фрак для шалопая (A Tail-Coat for an Idler) (1979)

==== 1980s ====
- Каждый третий (Every Third) (1980)
- Какие наши годы! (What Years!) (1980)
- Ленинградцы, дети мои... (The People of Leningrad, My Children...) (1980)
- Большая короткая жизнь (Big Short Life) (1981)
- Куда он денется! (Where Will He Go?) (1981)
- Любовь моя (My Love) (1981)
- Смотри в оба! (Keep Your Eyes Open!) (1981)
- Suyunchi (Russian: Бабушка-генерал) (Grandma General) (1982)
- Инспектор ГАИ (The Traffic Officer) (1982)
- Юность гения (The Childhood of the Genius) (1982)
- Двое под одним зонтом (Two Under One Umbrella) (1983)
- Жаркое лето в Кабуле (A Hot Summer in Kabul) (1983)
- Пароль — «Отель Регина» (Password: The Hotel Regina) (1983)
- Стрелять сгоряча не стоит (Shooting Rashly is not Good) (1983)
- Уроки на завтра (Lessons for Tomorrow ) (1983)
- Kelinlar qoʻzgʻoloni (Russian: Бунт невесток) (The Rebellion of the Brides) (1984)
- Vuodillik kelin (Russian: Невеста из Вуадиля) (A Bride from Vuodil) (1984)
- Маленькое одолжение (A Small Favor) (1984)
- Наедине (In Private) (1984)
- Туфли с золотыми пряжками (The Shoes with Golden Buckles) (1984)
- Прощай, зелень лета... (Farewell, Summer's Greens) (1985)
- Сезон чуд (The Season of Marvels) (1985)
- Я тебя помню (I Remember You) (1985)
- Armon (Russian: Уходя, остаются) (Sorrow) (1986)
- Выше радуги (Higher than a Rainbow) (1986)
- Кто войдет в последний вагон (Who will Board the Last Car) (1986)
- Объятие мечты (The Embrace of a Dream) (1986)
- Секунда на подвиг (A Second for a Feat) (1986)
- Pushaymon (Russian: Горечь падения) (Regret) (1987)
- Визит к Минотавру (A Visit to Minotavr) (1987)
- Клиника (The Clinic) (1987)
- Сад желаний (The Garden of Desires) (1987)
- Западня (The Trap) (1988)
- Колка (The Chopping) (1988)
- Приключения Арслана (Arslan's Adventures) (1988)
- Узник замка Иф (The Count of Monte Cristo) (1988)
- Чудовище или кто-то другой (A Monster or Somebody Else) (1988)
- Шок (Shock) (1988)
- Katta urushdagi kichkina odam (Russian: Маленький человек в большой войне) (A Small Man in a Big War) (1989)
- Бархан (The Dune) (1989)
- Восточная плутовка (The Eastern Rogue) (1989)
- Искусство жить в Одессе (The Art of Living in Odessa) (1989)
- Кодекс молчания (The Code of Silence) (1989)

==== 1990 ====
- Tangalik bolalar (Children from Tanga) (1990)
- Temir xotin (Russian: Чудо-женщина) (The Iron Woman) (1990)
- Сто дней до приказа (One Hundred Days Before the Command) (1990)

=== Post-Soviet films ===
==== 1990s ====
- Abdullajon (Abdullajon) (1991)
- Roʻzi mahshar (Russian: Судный день) (The Judgement Day) (1991)
- Temir erkak (Russian: Железный мужчина) (The Iron Man) (1991)
- Kim jinni? (Russian: Кто сумасшедший?) (Who is Insane?) (1992)
- Olov qaʼridagi farishta (Russian: Ангел в огне) (An Angel on Fire) (1992)
- Qirqquloq siri (The Secret of the Fern) (1992)
- Кодекс молчания 2 (The Code of Silence 2) (1992)
- Маклер (The Broker) (1992)
- Мушкетёры 20 лет спустя (The Musketeers 20 Years Later) (1992)
- Нулевой вариант (Option Zero) (1992)
- В Багдаде всё спокойно (Everything is Quiet in Baghdad) (1993)
- Не стреляйте в пассажира (Do not Shoot the Passenger) (1993)
- Счастье мое, ты оплачено кровью (My Happiness, You're Paid with Blood) (1993)
- Тайна королевы Анны, или Мушкетёры тридцать лет спустя (The Secret of Queen Anna or Musketeers 30 Years Later ) (1993)
- Трам-тарарам, или бухты-барахты (Hullabaloo, or Off the Cuff) (1993)
- Хагги Траггер (Hagi-Tragger) (1994)
- Великий Туран (The Great Turan) (1995)
- Otamdan qolgan dalalar (Russian: Отчие долины) (Fields Which Remained from My Father) (1997)
- Аферы, музыка, любовь... (Scams, Music, Love...) (1997)
- Bo Ba Bu (1998)
- Луна папа (Moon Father) (1999)

==== 2000s ====
- Alpomish (Alpomish) (2000)
- Tohir va Zuhra (Tohir and Zuhra) (2000)
- Voiz (The Orator) (2000)
- Женское царство (The Kingdom of Women) (2000)
- Dilhiroj (The Dancing Men) (2002)
- Osmondagi bolalar (Russian: Мальчики в небе) (Kids in the Sky) (2002)
- Osmondagi bolalar 2 (Russian: Мальчики в небе 2) (Kids in the Sky 2) (2003)
- Qor qo'ynida lola (Tulip in the snow) (2003)
- Sevinch (Sevinch) (2004)
- Sarvinoz (Sarvinoz) (2004)
- Ko'rgilik (2005)
- Erkak (The Man) (2005)
- Kelgindi kuyov (The Immigrant Bridegroom) (2005)
- Orzu ortida (Following a Dream) (2005)
- Sarvinoz 2 (Sarvinoz 2) (2005)
- Kelgindi kelin (The Alien Bride) (2006)
- O'tov (The yurt) (2007)
- Boyvachcha (The Rich Guy) (2007)
- Jazo (Punishment) (2007)
- Panoh (Succor) (2007)
- Zumrad va Qimmat (Zumrad and Qimmat) (2007)
- Telba (Insane) (2008)
- Boyvachcha 2: Amakivachchalar (The Rich Guy 2: The Cousins) (2008)
- Jannat qaydadir (Where is Paradise) (2008)
- Nortoy (Nortoy) (2008)
- Shabnam (Shabnam) (2008)
- Sukunat (Silence) (2008)
- Super kelinchak (The Super Bride) (2008)
- Tashlandiq (The Foundling) (2008)
- Telba (Russian: Иной) (Insane) (2008)
- Achchiq hayot (A Bitter Life) (2009)
- Challari (Challari) (2009)
- Chol va nabira (The Old Man and His Grandson) (2009)
- Faryod (The Cry) (2009)
- Ichkuyov (The Groom who Lives with his In-Laws) (2009)
- Janob hech kim (Russian: Мистер Х) (Mr. Nobody) (2009)
- Kirakash (The Gypsy Cab Driver) (2009)
- Oshiqlar (The Beloved) (2009)
- Oʻzimdan oʻzimgacha (From Me to Myself) (2009)
- Qalbaki dunyo (A Fake World) (2009)
- Soʻnggi lahza (Russian: Последнее мгновение) (The Last Moment) (2009)
- Tundan tonggacha (Russian: От заката до рассвета) (From Dusk to Dawn) (2009)
- Uylanish (Getting Married) (2009)

==== 2010s ====
2010

- Kechikkan hayot (Belated life) (2010)
- Farishta (An Angel) (2010)
- Hijron (The Separation) (2010)
- Majruh (The Sick Man) (2010)
- Men talabaman! (I'm a Student!) (2010)
- Nazar (The Look) (2010)
- Oʻgʻrigina kelin (The Light-Fingered Bride) (2010)
- Qalb koʻzi (The Eye of the Soul) (2010)
- Qorakoʻz (Qorakoʻz) (2010)
- Sahahrlik olifta (The Stylish Urban Boy) (2010)
- Sevginator 2: Qaynona operatsiyasi (Sevginator 2: Operation: mother-in-law) (2010)
- Shomurod va Durdona (Shomurod and Durdona) (2010)
- Tango yoxud adashgan sovchilar (Tango or the Errant Matchmakers) (2010)
- Uchar qiz (The Flying Girl) (2010)
- Xavfli sarguzasht (A Dangerous Adventure) (2010)
- Yuma-yuz (Face to Face) (2010)

2011

- Aldangan ayol (A Misled Woman) (2011)
- Bekochilar makoni (The Land of the Lazybones) (2011)
- Farzandim (My Child) (2011)
- Baxt izlab (Seeking Happiness) (2011)
- Er bermoq — jon bermoq (Giving Your Husband — Giving Your Life) (2011)
- Hay-fay bolakay (The Hi-Fi Kiddo) (2011)
- Ishonch (Trust) (2011)
- Jigarbandim (My Kin) (2011)
- Jodugar (The Witch) (2011)
- Kelgindi kelin 2: Anjancha muhabbat (The Alien Bride 2: Love, Andijan Style) (2011)
- Kichkina xoʻjayin (The Small Boss) (2011)
- Mening akam boʻydoq! (My Brother is a Bachelor) (2011)
- Oling quda, bering quda (Take and Give, My In-Laws) (2011)
- Omadli yigitlar (The Lucky Boys) (2011)
- Oʻxshatmasdan uchratmas (She's Just Like Him) (2011)
- Uchrashuv (The Meeting) (2011)
- Yondiradi, kuydiradi (My Love, My Pain) (2011)
- Zamonaviy sovchilar (The Modern Matchmakers) (2011)

2012

- Parizod (Heaven - my abode) (2012)
- Aql va yurak (The Mind and the Heart) (2012)
- Endi dadam boʻydoq? (Now My Father is Bachelor?) (2012)
- Hay, hay, qizaloq! (Hey, Girl!) (Former title: Manzil (Destination)) (2012)
- Oʻgay ona (The Stepmother) (2012)
- Salom sevgi, xayr sevgi (Hello Love, Good-Bye Love) (2012)
- Sevgi farishtasi (The Angel of Love) (2012)
- Soʻnggi qoʻngʻiroq (The Last Bell) (2012)
- Super qaynona (The Super Mother-in-Law) (2012)
- Tundan tonggacha davom etadi... (From Dusk to Dawn Continues...) (2012)
- Vafodorim (My Faithful) (2012)
- Visol (The Encounter) (2012)
- Yolgʻizginam (My Only) (2012)

2013

- Bevalar (The Widows) (2013)
- Ishonch (Trust) (2013)
- Turist (Tourist) (2013)

2014

- Amerikanets
- Chilla
- Geologist - Stronger than Death (Геолог Сильнее Смерти)
- Heart of Snow
- Nae Pasaran
- Silk Road Ghosts

2018

- Scorpion (2018)

2019

- Hot Bread (2019)

==== 2020s ====
2020

- Colorless dreams (2020)
- 2000 Songs of Farida (2020)

2021

- Hayot afsunlari (2021)
- I’m Not a Terrorist (rus Я - не террорист. (2021)
- Fara Tashkentskiy (2021)

2025

- In Pursuit of Spring

== See also ==
- Cinema of Uzbekistan
- List of Uzbekistani film actors
- Culture of Uzbekistan
- List of Uzbekistan people
