= Khabibulla Nizamov =

Professional Uzbek bodybuilder

- ♂ professional bodybuilder
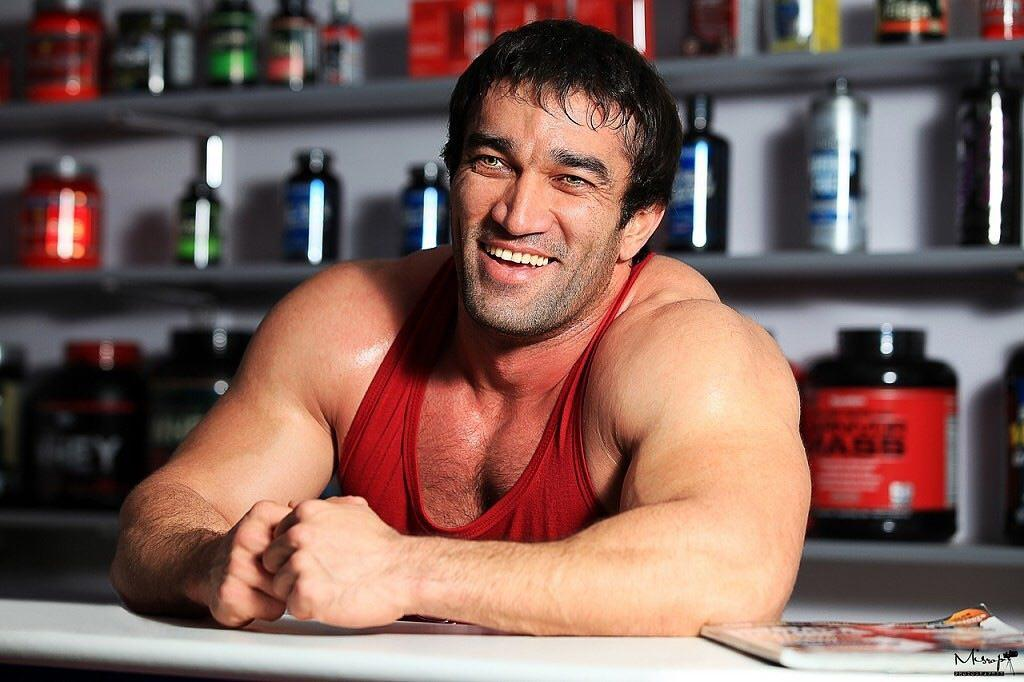

Personal info
- Born: 1 September 1978 (age 46); Tashkent, Uzbek SSR, USSR

Best statistics
- Weight: Contest: 105 kg Off season: 115 kg

Professional (Pro) career
- Pro-debut: Arnold – IFBB, Light-HeavyWeight; 2010
- Best win: 11th WBPF Championship; 2012
- Successor: Dilshod Niyazov

Khabibulla Nizamov (uzb. Xabibulla Nizamov Xamidullayevich born 1 September 1978) is an Uzbek professional bodybuilder, mas wrestling athlete and actor. He is the President of Bodybuilding and Fitness Federation of Tashkent, honoured worker of UzFBF and a multiple medallist in national and international bodybuilding competitions.

== Biography ==
Khabibulla Nizamov was born in Tashkent and he started his sports career in Karate. In 2006, he started his bodybuilding career and he began participating at bodybuilding tournaments when he was 26 years old. His first international competition was World Amateur Championships – IFBB that was held in Doha, Qatar. He graduated from Tashkent State University of Economics. He is married and he has 4 children; 3 daughters and 1 son.

== Filmography ==
Khabibulla Nizamov started appearing in Uzbek movies at late 2010 as a bodyguard, coach and trainer. He gained wide recognition and fame in Uzbekistan in 2010–2012 after starring in the Uzbek drama films "Dada" and "Dilor".

Film
Year	Film	Role	Notes
2010	Dada (Father)	Boxing Coach	Melodrama
2011	Qasos (The Revenge)	Episode	Comedy, Drama
2012	Dil va Or (Soul and Honor)		Drama
2016	Baron	Prisoner	Action, Crime
2016	Virus (Virus)		Crime, Drama

== Competitions ==
2009 World Amateur Championships – IFBB, Light-HeavyWeight, Doha, Qatar.

2010 Arnold Amateur – IFBB, Light-HeavyWeight, OHIO, USA

2012 Asian Amateur Championships – IFBB, Super-HeavyWeight, 6th

2012 Uzbekistan Cup Bodybuilding -Tashkent, Uzbekistan 1st

2013 Proform Classic Festival – Night of Champions Tashkent, Uzbekistan

2013 – Asian Bodybuilding Amateur Championship Almaty, Kazakhstan 2nd

2019 11th WBPF Championship South Korea, Cheju

2020 Arnold Classic Championship International MAS Wrestling, CA, US
