= Virus (2016 film) =

- Directed by: Akbar Bekturdiyev
- Written by: Mansur Vasati
- Produced by: Diyor Mahkamov
- Starring: Diyor Mahkamov; Shahzoda Matchanova; Yulduz Rajabova; Shokira Mahkamova; Akbarxo'ja Rasulov
- Music by: Donyor Agzamov
- Release date: November 29, 2016
- Running time: 115 minutes
- Country: Uzbekistan
- Language: Uzbek

Virus is a 2016 Uzbek Drama film directed by Akbar Bekturdiyev and produced by Diyor Mahkamov. The film stars Diyor Mahkamov Shahzoda Matchanova and Yulduz Rajabova.

== Plot ==
Bahtiyor was the campaign manager and head of the family, and Bakhtiyor's affairs were going well until Nargiza, Bakhtiyor's wife Lola's friend, came to their house. One day Nargiza comes to Bahtiyor's house. Nargiza and Lola talk and don't notice that time has passed. Nargiza tells her to go home, and Bahhtiyor takes Nargiza home because it's late. Nargiza takes this opportunity to invite Bahtiyor to her house. Bahtiyal is dissatisfied at first and then agrees and enters Nargiza's house. Nargiza adds medicine to Bahtiyor's coffee. Bahtiyor, who drank coffee, felt dizzy and fainted, and when he opened his eyes he saw Nargiza lying next to him. From that day on, unhappy days began in Bahtiyor's life. Avaliga tells Bahtiyor that Nargiza has videotaped everything that happened to Bahtiyor, threatens Bahtiyor and demands money from Bakhtiyor. Bahtiyor agrees to pay and pays. Nargiza's demands are growing. Nrgiza asked Bahtiyor to give her house. Bahtiyor said no and told police to report, and Nargiza hired street thugs and started beating Bahtiyor. Bahtiyor had no choice but to give Nargiza a house. Nargiz's demands were to share Bahtiyor's company shares. Bahtiyor gave part of his shares to Nargiza. Bahtiyor was under pressure from all sides. Hooligans, realizing Bahtiyor's weakness, demanded money. Lola asked why she sold the house. The company's shareholders were looking for Bahtiyor. Unable to withstand the pressure, Bahtiyor climbed to the top of the building and, realizing that he had no choice but to lower himself, threw himself down the building.

== Cast ==
- Diyor Mahkamov as Bohodir
- Shahzoda Matchanova as Nargiza
- Yulduz Rajabova as Lola
- Shokira Mahkamova
- Akbarxo'ja Rasulov
- Khabibulla Nizamov as aka
- Nurmuxammadxon Xusniddinov as aka
- Iso To'rayev
- Qahramon Sharipov
- Rixsitilla Abdullayev
- Mirmuhammad Husniddinov
- Manuchehra Qalandarzoda
- Radjabova Azisa

== Soundtrack ==
Virus

Soundtrack album by Donyor Agzamov
- Released: 4 September 2016
- Recorded: 2016
- Genre: Film soundtrack
- Length: 4:15
- Language: Uzbek
- Label: Navo Music
- Producer: Donyor Agzamov

Donyor Agzamov chronology
Donyor Agzamov (2016)	Virus (2016)	Jasur Badalbayev (2016)

Donyor Agzamov was roped in to compose the original soundtrack and score for Virus.

== Budget ==
The film's producer, Diyor Mahkamov, spoke about the budget of the film "Virus" in one of the programs of Zoʻr TV channel in 2016. Diyor Mahkamov said that the film brought him a good income. He declined to say the exact amount. It has been shown in 12 regional cinemas of Uzbekistan and in all cinemas in Tashkent. It has also been shown in cinemas in some Central Asian countries.
