= Dilshod =

Dilshodjon
- Gender: Male

Origin
- Origin: Persian
- Meaning: "Of Mars, Warlike, Warrior, The heart of joy "
- Region of origin: Persia

Other names
- Alternative spelling: Delshad; Dilshad

Dilshodjon is a Central Asian masculine given name derived from Persian (دلشاد, Delshad). Notable people with the name include:

- Dilshod Aripov (born 1977), Uzbekistani Greco-Roman wrestler
- Dilshod Choriev (born 1985), Uzbekistani judoka
- Dilshod Juraev (born 1992), Uzbekistani footballer
- Dilshod Komilov (born 1999), Uzbekistani football defender
- Dilshod Mahmudov (born 1982), Uzbekistani boxer
- Dilshod Mansurov (born 1983), Uzbekistani freestyle wrestler
- Dilshod Mukhtarov (born 1975), Uzbekistani sport shooter
- Dilshod Nazarov (born 1982), Tajikistani hammer thrower
- Dilshod Niyazov (born 1988), Uzbekistani bodybuilder
- Dilshod Rakhmatullaev (born 1989), Uzbekistani football midfielder
- Dilshodbek Ruzmetov (born 1999), Uzbekistani boxer
- Dilshod Saitov (born 1999), Uzbekistani football midfielder
- Dilshod Sharofetdinov (born 1985), Uzbekistani footballer
- Dilshod Turdiev (born 1991), Uzbekistani wrestler
- Dilshod Vasiev (born 1988), Tajikistani football midfielder
- Dilshod Yarbekov (born 1974), Uzbekistani boxer
- Dilshod Yuldashev (born 1976), Uzbekistani boxer
