= OVoz =

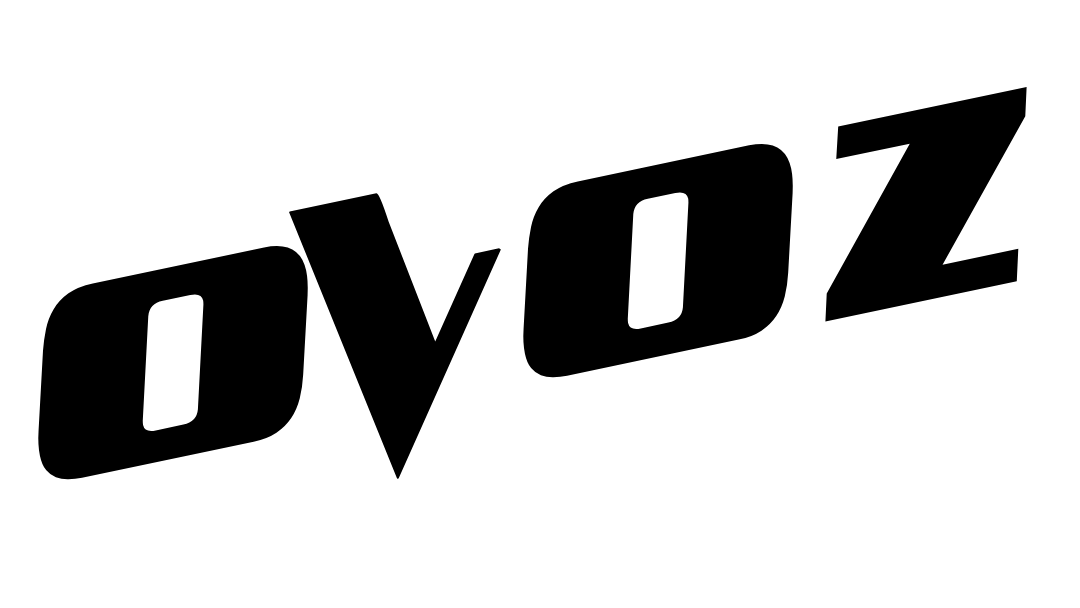
- Genre: Reality television
- Created by: John de Mol Jr.
- Presented by: Mirshakar Fayzulloyev, Jahongir Xo’jayev, Khusnora Shadiyeva
- Judges: Farrukh Zokirov; Ozodbek Nazarbekov; Sevara Nazarkhan; Tohir Sodiqov; Anvar Juraev; Nasiba Abdullaeva; Shohruxxon
- Country of origin: Uzbekistan
- No. of seasons: 2
- No. of episodes: 17

Production
- Producer: ITV Studios
- Production location: Tashkent

Original release
- Network: Zo'r TV
- Release: 20 April 2024 – present

Related
- The Voice (franchise)

Ovoz (Uzbek for The Voice) is an Uzbek singing reality competition television series broadcast on Zo'r TV. Created by John de Mol Jr., it premiered on 20 April 2024. Based on the original The Voice of Holland, and part of The Voice franchise, it aims to find unsigned singing talent (solo or duets, professional and amateur) contested by aspiring singers, age 16 or over, drawn from public auditions.

Presentation ceremony was held on 16 March 2024 on the Zo'r TV channel. At the press conference held on the same day, it was said that Uzbekistan is the 74th country in the world that has received the right to show this TV project. At the ceremony, Farrukh Zokirov, Sevara Nazarkhan, Tohir Sodiqov and Ozodbek Nazarbekov were introduced as the first coaches of the "Voice" musical project.

== Series overview ==
| Season | Aired | Winner | Runner-up | Third place | Fourth place | Winning coach | Presenter | Coaches (chair's order) | | | |
| Season | Aired | Winner | Runner-up | Third place | Fourth place | Winning coach | Presenter | 1 | 2 | 3 | 4 |
|---|---|---|---|---|---|---|---|---|---|---|---|
| 1 | 2024 | Shohruxmirzo Ganiyev | Umida Qozoqboyeva | Anna Gurjiyeva | Zafar Gofurov | Sevara Nazarxon | Mirshakar Fayzulloyev | Ozodbek | Tohir | Sevara | Farrukh |
| 2 | 2026 | Diyora Jafarova | Kurash Sheroz | Saban Sardor | Sukunat Shukurullo | Nasiba Adullaeva | Mirshakar Fayzulloyev | Anvar | Nasiba | Farrukh | Shohruhxon |

== OVoz Bolalar ==
OVoz Bolalar is the children’s edition of the television project OVoz. This musical show is the Uzbek adaptation of the vocal competition format The Voice Kids, originally created by Dutch producer John de Mol Jr. It premiered on Zoʻr TV on October 12, 2024.

| Season | Aired | Winner | Runner-up | Third place | Winning coach | Presenters | | Coaches (chair's order) | | |
| Season | Aired | Winner | Runner-up | Third place | Winning coach | Presenters | | 1 | 2 | 3 |
|---|---|---|---|---|---|---|---|---|---|---|
| 1 | 2024 | Qodirjon Valijonov | Sevara Narzullayeva | Yasmina Khusniddinova | Botir Qodirov | Jahongir Xo’jayev | Khusnora Shadieva | DJ Piligrim | Sevara | Botir |
| 2 | 2026 | | | | | | | | | |

== OVoz 50+ ==
Ovoz 50+ is the Uzbek adaptation of the musical television project OVoz designed for senior participants. It is based on the format of The Voice Senior a vocal competition originally created by Dutch producer John de Mol Jr. The show premiered on May 3, 2025, on the Zoʻr TV channel.

| Season | Aired | Winner | Runner-up | Third place | Winning coach | Presenter | Coaches (chair's order) | | |
| Season | Aired | Winner | Runner-up | Third place | Winning coach | Presenter | 1 | 2 | 3 |
|---|---|---|---|---|---|---|---|---|---|
| 1 | 2025 | O'lmas Olloberganov | Guljahon Baizova | Zohida Umarova | Farrukh Zokirov | Mirshakar Fayzulloyev | DJ Piligrim | Kumush | Farrukh |

== OVoz O'smirlar ==
Ovoz O’smirlar is the teenage edition of the television project OVoz. This musical show is the Uzbek adaptation of the vocal competition format The Voice Teens, originally from Colombia which is created by Dutch producer John de Mol Jr. The show premiered on July 26, 2025, on the Zoʻr TV channel.

| Season | Aired | Winner | Runner-up | Third place | Winning coach | Presenter | Coaches (chair's order) | | |
| Season | Aired | Winner | Runner-up | Third place | Winning coach | Presenter | 1 | 2 | 3 |
|---|---|---|---|---|---|---|---|---|---|
| 1 | 2025 | Laylo | Zarima | Shaydoxon | Shohruhxon | Mirshakar Fayzulloyev | Anvar | Kumush | Shohruhxon |
