= Nodirbek =

Nodirbek is an Uzbek masculine given name. Notable people with the name include:

- Nodirbek Abdusattorov (born 2004), Uzbek chess player
- Nodirbek Primqulov (born 1998), Uzbek singer and actor
- Nodirbek Yakubboev (born 2002), Uzbek chess player
