= Zafar Khashimov =

Uzbek businessman, athlete, and philanthropist

- Zafar Hoshimov
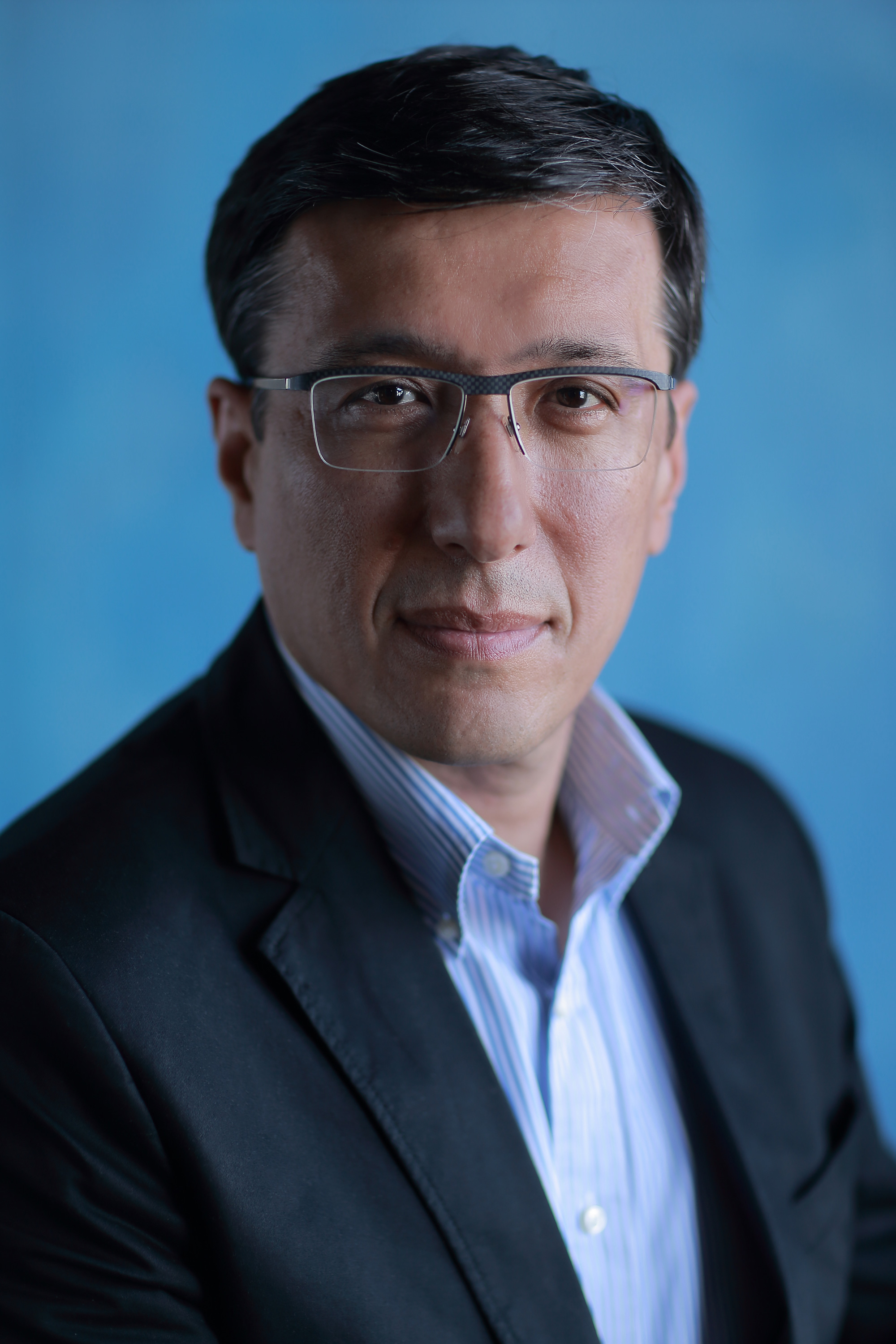
- Khashimov in 2020
- Born: Zafar Karimovich Khashimov; June 29, 1968 (age 58); Tashkent, Uzbek SSR, Soviet Union
- Education: National University of Uzbekistan (1992); University of Sussex (1994)
- Awards: Order of Friendship

Zafar Khashimov (Uzbek: Zafar Karimovich Hoshimov, Зафар Ҳошимов; born June 29, 1968) is an Uzbek businessman , founder of the Korzinka supermarket chain, Uzbekistan's largest food retail networks. Korzinka was established in 1996 and operates more than 190 stores across 12 regions of Uzbekistan.

== Biography ==
Zafar Khashimov was born on June 29, 1968, in the city of Tashkent, into a family of intellectuals. After Hashimov finished school in 1992, he studied probability theory and mathematical statistics at Tashkent University. From 1992 to 1994, he studied at the University of Sussex (Brighton, England).

From 1992 to 1995, he worked as the general director of "UzEX" limited liability company.

From 1995 to 1997, he worked as a director of business development at Balton Trading (Asia).

In December 1996, he founded the Anglesey Food brand. In 1997, the entrepreneur opened the first store under the Anglesey Food brand and laid the foundation for the development of the supermarket chain in Uzbekistan.

In 2005, the network was rebranded. Since then, supermarkets have started to develop under the "korzinka.uz" brand. In 2010, the company divided Smart home stores, and in 2016, Korzinka.uz Discount wholesale supermarkets into separate departments, and began to diversify the forms of service.

In 2018, he founded the multi-brand Turkish shoe store "FLO" for the first time in Uzbekistan.

In 2019, Five opened a food court in Tashkent, considered to be the first food court opened not as an addition to a shopping and entertainment center, but as a separate gastronomic project.

In November 2019, it became known that the European Bank for Reconstruction and Development will directly invest up to 40 million US dollars in the share capital of Anglesey Food LLC, the operator of the supermarket chain "korzinka.uz". Investments will be directed to support the network expansion program from the current 50 supermarkets to 140 supermarkets by 2025, as well as to improve operational efficiency and corporate governance standards in line with international standards. In February 2020, an agreement was signed with the European Bank for Reconstruction and Development.

In May 2020, Khashimov became the founder and member of the Board of Trustees of TEAM University, the first entrepreneurial university in Uzbekistan.

== Filmography ==
Below is a chronologically ordered list of films in which Zafar Khashimov has appeared.

=== TV serials ===
| Year | Title | Role |
|---|---|---|
| 2020–2021 | Start-up | |
| 2020–2021 | InSight | |
| 2023 | Xalqaro Press Club | |

== Business views ==
The following quotes by Zafar Khashimov in his interviews about business express his views:

- "The most important thing in business is not knowing the good answers, but asking the right questions."
- "I always make purchases from korzinka.uz. You definitely need to get a taste of your business."
- "My advice to my 20-year-old self: 'It's important to be an expert. Don't be like a duck—it can fly, swim, and walk, but does everything else badly. Better fly, swim, or walk: just one service'."

== In social networks ==
Zafar Khashimov commented on Shavkat Mirziyoyev's task to reduce the value-added tax (VAT) rate, saying that tax rates, first of all, the reduction of the VAT rate in the process of parallel expansion of the taxpayer base and cancellation of all benefits related to this tax, will help reduce the shadow economy sector and tax taxation. Expressed his opinion about making it fairer for business, and this caused a lot of discussion in the social network.

== Awards ==
- "Sign of Uzbekistan" badge
- Badge of the Ministry of Defense "For Exemplary Services".
- Commemorative badge "25 years of Independence of Uzbekistan".
- Commemorative badge "25 years to the Constitution of Uzbekistan".
- "30 years of Independence of Uzbekistan" commemorative badge
- Commemorative badge "30 years to the Constitution of Uzbekistan".
- 2021 Order of Friendship
- 2025 Honored Entrepreneur of the Republic of Uzbekistan
