= Mening toʻyim =

2022 war film

- Directed by: Muhammad Ali Navruzov
- Written by: Muhammad Ali Navruzov
- Produced by: Muhammad Ali Navruzov
- Starring: Muhammad Ali Navruzov; Sitora Alimjanova; Alsal Shodiyeva; Shohruhxon; Rikhsitilla Abullaev; Umidaxon; Moʻmin
- Production company: 23 tv
- Release date: August 22, 2022
- Running time: 70 min.
- Country: Uzbekistan
- Language: Uzbek
- Budget: 500,000 soʻm

Mening Toʻyim is a 2022 Uzbek comedy mystery film directed by Muhammad Ali Navruzov and written by Muhammad Ali Navruzov and Muhammad Ali Navruzov, who also stars. The main characters Sitora Alimjanova and Muhammad Ali Navruzov about the problems of the wedding. About the events of Uzbek weddings in the 1990s. The film also stars Shohruhxon and Asal Shodiyeva.

== Plot ==
The film was shot in the 1990s about Uzbek weddings.

== Creation ==
At the conference, Uzbekistan, screenwriters and historians spoke about the biography of 1990, the interpretation of the events that occurred in that period.

The filming of the film was conducted by the film company "23 Film". Famous Uzbek actors starred in the film.

The atmosphere of that time has been recreated on the site of the movie "23 TV". In cooperation with Uzbek filmmakers, urban and wedding scenes were created on 10 hectares of land. A model of the Toshkenet buildings in 1990 has been created.

The soundtrack for the film was sung by Munisa Rizayeva.

== Cast ==
- Muhammad Ali Navruzov
- Sitora Alimjonova
- Shohruhxon
- Munisa Rizayeva - Munisa
- Rihsitilla Abdullaev
- Asal Shodiyeva
- Oybek Teshboev
- Umidaxon
- Otabek Mirzaxolov
- Muyassar Berdiqulova
- Feruza Sobitova
- Moʻmin
- Abduvali Radjabov
- Tolib Mo‘minov
