= Majnun (film) =

- Directed by: Jahongir Ahmedov
- Screenplay by: Jahongir Ahmedov
- Produced by: Diyor Mahkamov
- Starring: Ulugʻbek Qodirov; Asal Shodiyeva; Rano Shodiyeva; Muhammad Iso Abdulhairov; Diyor Mahkamov
- Music by: Doniyor Agzamov
- Release date: 2016
- Running time: 102 minutes
- Country: Uzbekistan
- Language: Uzbek

Majnun (rus. Мажнун uzb. Majnun) is a 2016 Uzbek melodrama film directed by Johongir Ahmedov and produced by Diyor Mahkamov. The film stars Ulugʻbek Qodirov, Asal Shodiyeva and Elyor Mahkamov.

== Plot ==
Majnun The film is about the life of a famous football player named Sardor Kamilov. All the journalists are interested in the whereabouts of the footballer, whose fans thought he was dead. A beautiful young journalist searches for Sardor for an interview. Sardor, who initially refuses, agrees on condition that she does not publish in the newspaper. The journalist who interviewed Sardor tells Sardor's secret to her friend, who publishes the information in a newspaper. Upon learning of this, the original interviewer is offended, and Sardor is very upset when he sees the information about him in the newspaper. The upset Sardor returns to his mountain hideaway. A family in the mountains is attacked by a pack of wolves; Sardor rushes to their aid and is killed by the wolves.

== Cast ==
- Ulugʻbek Qodirov: Sardor Komilov
- Asal Shodiyeva: Iroda
- Elyor Mahkamov: Nodir
- Matyoqub Matjonov: Asat cho’pon
- Rano Shodiyeva:?
- Diyor Mahkamov: Shokirjon
- Muhammad Iso Abdulhairov: Qilich
- Shorira Ismoilova:?
- Anjela Esimbetova: Zebo
- Asqar Hikmatov: Qodir
- Mirshod Atavullayev: Jamshid
- Elyor Nosirov: ustoz
- Radjabova Azisa : Afruza

== Sound post-production ==
Sound director Doniyor Agzamov. Sound design Doniyor Agzamov. CineLab sound post-production complex. Dolby Digital 5.1

=== Music ===
The music for the film "Majnun" was written Doniyor Agzamov.

The soundtrack of the film "Majnun" was performed by the famous Uzbek singer uz:Shohruhxon

== Income ==
The film premiered on February 19, 2016, in Uzbekistan. This film was one of the most watched films in Uzbekistan.The budget and gross of the film have not been announced.
