= Awok =

E-commerce Company

Awokawik Awok
- Area served: Middle East
- Key people: Ulugbek Yuldashev (Founder & CEO)
- Employees: 350+
- Website: www.awok.com
- Commercial: Yes
- Registration: Required
- Current status: Closed

Awok was an e-commerce company headquartered in Dubai, UAE. The company used to sell items such as clothing, fashion accessories, kitchenware, home appliances, consumer electronics and beauty products. Awok closed in 2020 despite receiving large investments.

== History ==
Awok was founded in 2013 by Ulugbek Yuldashev. The company was headquartered in Dubai, UAE.

In April 2019, the company raised $30 million in funding, the company was also planning to launch its own private label. It was reported that in 2020, the company had stopped paying its creditors including suppliers, logistics providers as well as the staff.
