= Alisher Uzoqov =

Alisher Uzoqov Alisher Uzakov
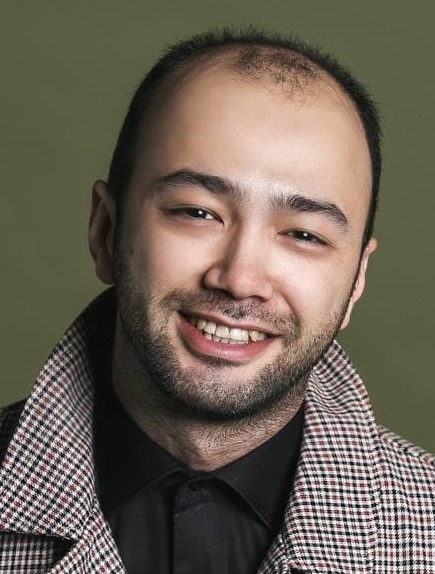

Background information
- Born: Alisher Uzoqov; August 25, 1984 (age 42)
- Origin: Tashkent, Uzbek SSR, USSR
- Occupations: Actor, director, singer, and footballer
- Years active: 2001–present
- Award: Order of Friendship

Alisher Uzoqov (Note: Uzbek: Alisher Uzoqov, Алишер Узоқов; Russian: Алишер Узаков, romanized: Alisher Uzakov.) (born August 25, 1984) is an Uzbek actor, film director, singer, and professional footballer. Uzoqov received widespread recognition and acclaim in Uzbekistan after starring in the 2009 Uzbek drama Janob hech kim (Mr. Nobody). Since then he has starred in many Uzbek comedy films. Uzoqov has also recorded a few songs.

Uzoqov has also tried his hand at directing. He has directed three films, namely, Mening akam boʻydoq! (My Brother is a Bachelor!) (2011), Endi dadam boʻydoq? (Now My Father is a Bachelor?) (2012), and Kuzda gullagan daraxt (The Tree That Blossomed in the Fall) (2015). In 2013, the actor announced his plans to quit acting, but has appeared in several films since.

Since 2012, Uzoqov has played for Istiqlol Football Club which competes in the Uzbekistan First League Akrom FC. In 2016, he became vice president of the Andijan Province Football Federation.

== Life ==
Alisher Uzoqov was born on August 25, 1984, in Tashkent, Uzbek SSR, USSR. He is a grandson of the celebrated Uzbek folk singer Maʼmurjon Uzoqov. His father, Muhammadjon Uzoqov, is a singer and actor. His mother, Shohida Uzoqova, is also a movie actress and has appeared alongside Uzoqov in several films, most notably in Soʻnggi lahza (The Last Moment) (2009), Tundan tonggacha (From Dusk to Dawn) (2009), Mening akam boʻydoq! (My Brother is single!) (2011), Uchrashuv (The Meeting) (2011), Soʻnggi qoʻngʻiroq (The Last Call) (2012), and Tundan tonggacha davom etadi... (From Dusk to Dawn Continues...) (2012). Uzoqov is married and has a son (Firdavs 2012) and a daughter (Soliha 2014).

== Filmography ==
=== Actor ===
Film
Year	Film	Role	Notes
1984	Kunda (Every Day)	Infant	Home video
2003	Великан (The Giant)		Short film
2006	Seni sevdim (I Love You)	Akrom	
2006	Xoʻja Nasriddin: Oʻyin boshlandi (Nasreddin Hodja: Game begins)		Voice only
2007	Faqat gʻalaba (Only Victory)	Schoolboy	
2007	Kechir (I'm Sorry)		Voice only
2008	Kichkina odamlar (Little Men)	Gʻozivoy	
2008	Telba (Insane)	Moʻmin	
2009	Mister hech kim (Mr. Nobody)	Alisher	
2009	Keragimsan (I Need You)	Davron	
2009	Kirakash (The Gypsy Cab Driver)	Bobur	
2009	Qalbaki dunyo (A Fake World)	Samad	
2009	Soʻnggi lahza (The Last Moment)	Akmal	
2009	Tundan tonggacha (From Dusk to Dawn)	Umid	
2009	Uylanish (Getting Married)	Javohir	
2009	Xavfli sarguzasht (A Dangerous Adventure)	Jamol	
2009	Challari		
2010	Farishta (Angel)	Rustam	
2010	Kichkina xoʻjayin (The Small Boss)	Rustam	
2010	Men talabaman! (I'm a Student!)	Sherzod	
2010	Qorakoʻz (Qorakoʻz)	Sarvar	
2011	Hay-fay bolakay (The Hi-Fi Kiddo)	Aziz	
2011	Ishonch (Trust)	Sobir	
2011	Mening akam boʻydoq! (My Brother is a Bachelor!)	Shamshod	
2011	Nafs (Craving)	Himself	Uncredited cameo
2011	Oling quda, bering quda (Take and Give, My In-Laws)	Gʻanisher	
2011	Omadli yigitlar (The Lucky Guys)	Avaz	
2011	Oʻxshatmasdan uchratmas	Aziz / Farhod	
2011	Uchrashuv (The Meeting)	Alisher	
2011	Zamonaviy sovchilar (The Modern Matchmakers)	Sanjar	
2012	Aql va yurak (The Mind and the Heart)	Farhod	
2012	Akajon xizmatingizdamiz (Brother, We're at Your Service)	Davron	
2012	Dunyo (The World)		
2012	Endi dadam boʻydoq? (Now My Father is a Bachelor?)	Shamshod	
2012	Oʻgay ona (The Stepmother)	Elnur	
2012	Sevgi farishtasi (The Angel of Love)	Jasur	
2012	Soʻnggi qoʻngʻiroq (The Last Bell)	Said	
2012	Super qaynona (The Super Mother-in-Law)		
2012	Tundan tonggacha davom etadi... (From Dusk to Dawn Continues...)	Umid	
2012	Uch, ikki, bir. Doʻst, dunyo, imkon (Three, Two, One. A Friend, the World, an Opportunity)	Javohir	
2012	Vafodorim (My Faithful)		
2012	Yolgʻizginam (My Only)	Jamshid	
2013	Bevalar (The Widows)	Akbar	
2013	Jannatdagi boʻri bolasi (A Wolf Cub in Paradise)		
2013	Lafz (A Promise)	Ulugʻbek	
2013	Mening doʻstim jin (My Friend the Genie)	Himself	Uncredited cameo
2013	Sen ketma (Don't Leave)	Himself	Cameo appearance
2013	Sensiz (Without You)		
2013	Sevgi farishtasi 2 (The Angel of Love 2)	Jasur	
2013	Tasodif (Fortuity)	Yodgor	
2013	Zamonaviy sovchilar 3 (Modern Matchmakers 3)	Sanjar	
2014	Angel of Death		Shot in Uzbekistan and the U.S.
2014	Sensiz hayot zerikarli (Life is Boring Without You)		
2014	Qorbobo Korporeyshn (Santa Corporation)		
2015	Kuzda gullagan daraxt (The Tree That Blossomed in the Fall)	Doniyor	
2016	Hayotda (In Life)		
2016	Yolgʻizlar (~)	Aziz	Voice only
2017	Muzlagan (~)		
2026	Chempion		

Television
Year	Title	Role	Notes
2001	Ostona (The Threshold)	Doston	3-4 episodes
2007	Застава (The Outpost)	Ismailov	Shot in Uzbekistan and Russia
2007	Dil payvandi (Soul Connection)	Ahror	
2008	Tutash taqdirlar (The Linked Destinies)	Jahongir	
2008	Zebuzar (Zebuzar)	Mahmud	

=== Music video appearances ===
Year	Song title	Artist
2008	"Bilaman"	Manzura
2008	"Ota-ona"	Mirjamol
2009	"Leylam"	Shohruhxon
2010	"Sensiz yashay olaman ishon"	Ulugʻbek Rahmatullayev
2010	"Yor-yor"	Sardor Rahimxon
2011	"Nima uchun?"	Sardor Rahimxon
2012	"Aylanib ketoyin"	Sardor Rahimxon
2012	"Nega endi?"	Rayhon
2013	"Qani?"	Rayhon
2013	"Judayam sogʻindim"	Manzura
2013	"Oʻzingda"	Ziyoda Qobilova
2016	"Chin sevaman"	Nilufar Usmanova
2016	"Otamdan yodgorim onam"	Sardor Rahimxon
2016	"Xalos et"	Rayhon
2018	Baxtli bo'l	Benom guruhi
2020	Yolg'on dunyo	Janob Rasul
2020	Qo'shnilar	VIA Marokand va Ziyoda
2020	Tanara	Ziyoda
2021	Kumush nolasi	Jasmin & Eski shahar
2022	Sevgiga vaqt yo'q	Maftuna & Imona
2022	Bekor sevdim	(Maftuna & Imona
2022	Do'st	Ozoda Nursaidova

=== Director ===
Year	Title	Notes
2008	Ota-ona (Mirjamol) (Parents)	Music videos
2011	Mening akam boʻydoq! (Now Brother is a Bachelor!)	Music videos
2012	Endi dadam boʻydoq? (Now My Father is a Bachelor?)	Music videos
2015	Kuzda gullagan daraxt (The Tree That Blossomed in the Fall)	Music videos
2016	Otamdan yodgorim onam (Sardor Rahimxon) (~)	Music videos
2017	Malina (Kaniza) (Raspberry)	Music videos
2017	Aladdin (Nilufar Usmanova) (Aladdin)	Music videos
2017	Muzlagan (~)	Music videos

=== Television ===
Year	TV show	Channel
2018 2021	This is TheCoverUp	Zoʻr TV
2022	We are talking about Tashkent (Tashkentdan gapiramiz)	Sevimli tv
2022	Who's who (Kim ekan)	Sevimli tv
2023	Xon Saroy Music	MY5

=== Screenwriter ===
Year	Title	Notes
2015	Kuzda gullagan daraxt (The Tree That Blossomed in the Fall)	

== Awards ==
Although he does not have more awards, most people enjoy his starring films and appreciate his acting talent.

Order of Friendship (2026)

Year	Festival	Film title	Category	Result
2012	M&TVA		Best actor	Won
2012	M&TVA	Endi dadam boʻydoq	Best film	Won

== Discography ==
=== Music videos ===
Year	Song	Director
2009	"Nahotki"	
2010	"Qorakoʻzim"	
2010	"Kichkina xoʻjayin" (featuring Ziyoda Qobilova)	
2011	"Hay-fay bolakay"	
2011	"Oshno"	
2011	"Oshiq yurak"	
2011	"Yonimda"	
2012	"Yonayoturman"	
2013	"Tilim qursin" (featuring Nilufar)	
2022	O'tgusidir	

== Football career ==
Since 2012, Uzoqov has played for Istiqlol Football Club which competes in the Uzbekistan First League. In 2016, he became vice president of the Andijan Province Football Federation.
