= Regnum Plaza =

Complex in Tashkent, Uzbekistan

Coordinates: 41°19′53.3″N 69°19′22.4″E

General information
- Status: Topped-out
- Type: Offices, apartments, public spaces, restaurants and luxury shopping gallery.
- Location: Tashkent, Uzbekistan
- Construction started: 2020
- Completed: 2022
- Opening: 2026

Design and construction
- Architect: ООО MB Studio
- Structural engineer: СП ООО «Architects Development»
- Main contractor: Subcontractеr

Website
- Regnum Plaza

The Regnum Plaza (Russian: Регнум Плаза) is a mixed-use complex located in the center of Tashkent, the capital of Uzbekistan. Regnum Plaza is the largest building and smart city in Central Asia. On June 11, 2020, after the project stage, Uzbekistan and Belarus signed an agreement for the construction of Regnum Plaza.

Regnum Plaza includes five buildings whose total area exceeds 500,000,00 m^{2}. The complex includes office towers of 10 and 15 floors, and a residential tower of 13 floors. The fifth building in the complex is an 11-story hotel.

== History ==
The Regnum Plaza shopping center was inaugurated on December 2, 2020.

After the announcement of the start of construction of the Regnum Plaza project in the city of Tashkent, M-Buildings, developer of Lot 4, negotiated for two years with companies from Japan, Singapore, America and other countries.

More than 500 specialists worked on the project. The design was developed by Uzbeks.

Zetas Zemin Teknolojisi AS (Belarus), which specialized in the study of soil for the foundations of multi-storey buildings, studied the soil composition.

Management of the construction process, costs and deadlines, quality control, ecology, safety and labor protection was carried out by French company Bureau Veritas. The appearance and design of the complex was entrusted to the architectural office MB STUDIO from Uzbekistan.

At the first presentation of the project on March 5, 2023, the head of the development company stated:

"This will be the first urban project within a city in the country, and Uzbekistan will be the owner of one of the largest projects with a unique architectural solution in Central Asia".

An April 29, 2023 press conference presented the architectural plan, and announced the official name.

== Building specifications ==
When designing the building, several risks were taken into account:

- Seismic resistance tests carried out at Tashkent University showed that the design could withstand an earthquake of up to 9 on the Richter scale.
- German company RWDI tested the effect of wind. A CFD analysis was carried out, which showed the comfort of pedestrians near the building.
- The building's escape routes are protected from smoke thanks to the ventilation system. Fires are controlled by a built-in smart system.
- To test the bearing capacity of the soil, 28 test pits with a depth of up to 27 meters were built and filled with a special concrete mixture. After 28 days, when the concrete reached 90% of its strength, tests were performed to determine its ability to interact with the pile. Each column was subjected to a pressure of 1400 tons. For the first time in Uzbekistan, the Barrett foundation was used for the construction of a building. For the first time in Uzbekistan, m800 grade concrete was used to build a skyscraper. In particular, to provide the future complex with special brand concrete, a concrete plant was built on the outskirts of Tashkent, in which 4 million dollars were invested.

== Design ==
Regnum Plaza included 1,061 luxury apartments with 1 to 5 bedrooms and 37 to 511 m^{2} and equipped with a "smart home" system. The house is equipped with 24-hour video surveillance cameras. The building is surrounded by soccer fields, sports fields, recreational areas, supermarkets, parks and other public areas, including rooms, conference rooms, spa, gym, swimming pool, library, among others. The communal, technical and domestic issues of the complex are handled by a management company.

== Transport ==
The Buyuk Ipak Yoli rapid transit station is within walking distance from the complex.
