= Osmondagi bolalar =

- Directed by: Zulfiqor Musoqov
- Written by: Zulfiqor Musoqov; Rikhsiboy Mukhamadjonov
- Produced by: Uzbekfilm
- Starring: Muzaffar Sadullaev; Timur Musoqov; Kristina Toirova; Aziz Sultonov; Davron Gulomov; Malika Alimova; Nozim Tulakhodjaev; Saida Rametova
- Cinematography: Norkhoja Sodiqov; Aziz Orziqulov
- Music by: Anvar Ergashev, Tohir Sodiqov, Sevara Nazarxon
- Release date: 2002
- Running time: 88 minutes
- Country: Uzbekistan
- Language: Uzbek

Osmondagi bolalar (Russian: Мальчики в небе, romanized: Malchiki v nebe; transl. Kids in the Sky) is a 2002 Uzbek film. The film has had success and has received acclaim as one of the best modern Uzbek films.

A sequel, Osmondagi bolalar 2, was released in Uzbekistan in 2003.
