= Malikam =

- Written by: Zebo Navruzva; Muhammad Ali Gusainov
- Directed by: Zebo Navruzva
- Starring: Muhammad Ali Navruzov; Farqngiz Xalikova; Xusnora Shodieva; Muhammad Ali Gusainov; Murod Nasimov; Komola Alimova
- Country of origin: Uzbekistan
- Original language: Uzbek
- No. of seasons: 1
- No. of episodes: 50

Production
- Producers: 23 TV; Muhammad Ali Navruzov
- Production locations: Uzbekistan, Turkey
- Cinematography: Ravshan Musaev
- Running time: 35–40 minutes (Zoʻr TV
- Production company: 23 film

Original release
- Network: Zoʻr TV
- Release: 20 September 2020 – present

Malikam - My princess is an Uzbek television drama that aired on Zoʻr TV. The series, produced by Muhammad Ali Navruzov, was shot in collaboration with Uzbek filmmakers in three countries: Uzbekistan the United States. The main roles in the film were played by Uzbek actors Muhammad Ali Navruzov, Farqngiz Xalikova, Xusnora Shodieva and Muhammad Ali Gusainov - the brightest examples of Uzbek cinema. Murod Nasimov, Komola Alimova and Nodira Muxammadova played a supporting role in this film.

The series has grossed over 600 million soms at the box office in Uzbekistan.

== Plot ==
Uzbek melodrama, the plot unfolds around our two main characters. It's about the beautiful Nakhiza, who graduated from a foreign university and returned to her homeland, and Ali, an ordinary Uzbek guy who spends most of his life on the streets of Tashkent.

== Creation ==
In September 2019, before the start of work on the "Malikam" series in Tashkent, work on the scripting of the "Malikam" series began, devoted to discussing the interpretation of ideas and drama. version of the film, as well as the casting process began.

The filming of the series was entrusted to the film company "23 Film". Famous young Uzbek actors and artists starred in the series.

The atmosphere of that time was revived on the website of the 23rd TV cinema. Over a period of time, Ubek's creative team will cover 30 hectares of landscape. 15 buildings in 45 offices and magazines were surveyed.

== Cast ==
- Muhammad Ali Navruzov — Ali
- Farqngiz Xalikova — Nargiza
- Xusnora Shodieva — Samira
- Parviz Kayumov — Asad
- Muhammad Ali Gusainov — Ganja
- Murod Nasimov — Olim
- Nodira Muxammadova — Komila
- Komola Alimova —

== Post-production ==
The music for the movie "Malikam" was written by Shohruhxon Karimov. Sound engineer Shohruhxon Karimov. Sound design by Shohruhxon Karimov.

CineLab Dolby Digital 5.1 audio post-production complex. The joint producer is Muhammad Ali Navruzov

== Sound post-production ==
=== Soundtrack ===
Malikam

Soundtrack album by Jasur Badalbaev
- Released: 2020
- Recorded: 2022
- Genre: Film soundtrack
- Length: 4:15
- Language: Uzbek
- Label: JB media
- Producer: 23 TV

Jasur Badalbaev chronology
Jasur Badalbaev (2022)	Malikam (2020)	Jasur Badalbaev (2022)

Jasur Badalbaev composed the original soundtrack and score.

== Awards and nominations ==
- On November 20, 2020, the "Malikqm" series won the "Zor TV" award in the "Best telenovela of the year" category.
- In 2020, Zor TV won the series Malikam in the nomination of the best cinematography of 2020.
- In 2020, the series Malikam was nominated for the best screenplay of 2020 by Zor TV.
