= Ulugbek Yuldashev =

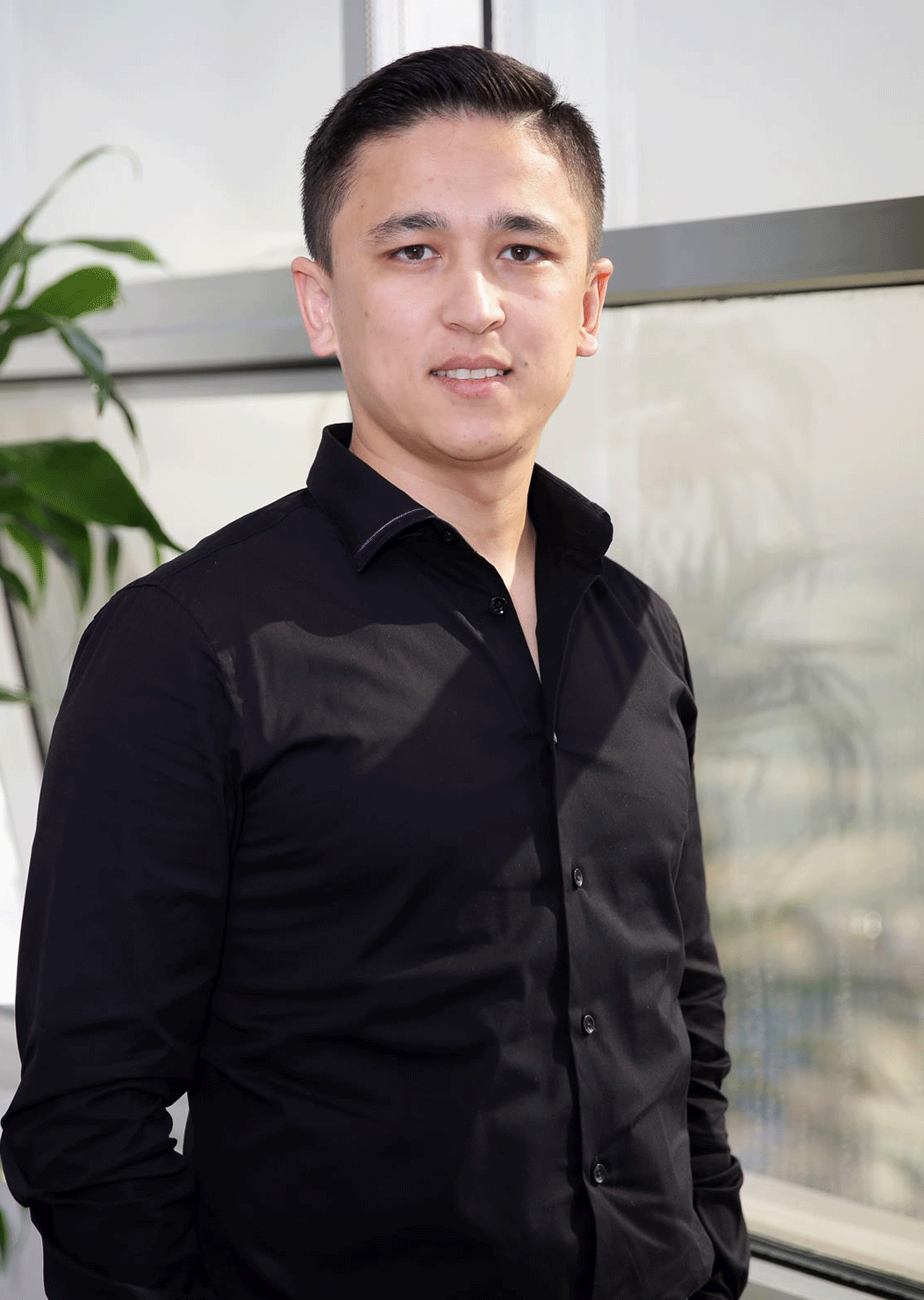
- Born: 1985 (age 40–41); Osh, Kyrgyzstan
- Known for: Founder & CEO of Awok.com

Ulugbek Yuldashev is an entrepreneur best known as founder of Awok.com, one of the largest e-commerce retailers in the Arab World. He founded the online store in 2013, which commenced operations, by selling electronics and gadgets and closed down by May 2020 due to lack of funds.

== Early life ==
Ulugbek Yuldashev was born in Osh, Kyrgyzstan.

== Career ==
Yuldashev has had a flair for business since an early age and started his first company in 2003 when he was 18 years old. It was a retail and wholesale business in Kyrgyzstan. In 2006, Yuldashev moved to Dubai and found a wholesale company called Alifco LLC followed by entering the e-commerce industry in the region with brand name AWOK.com in 2013.
