= Shohruxxon =

Uzbekistani singer-songwriter and actor

Shohruhxon

Background information
- Born: Shohrux Alisherovich Yoʻldoshev; May 29, 1985 (age 41); Tashkent, Uzbekistan
- Genre: Pop folk
- Occupations: Singer; actor
- Instruments: Vocals; guitar
- Years active: 2005–present
- Labels: Tarona, RizaNova, Xonsoroy Media
- Spouse: Asal Shodiyeva (m. 2016)
- Award: Honored Artist of Uzbekistan

Shohrux Yoʻldoshev (Uzbek: Shohrux Yoʻldoshev; born 29 May 1985), commonly known by his stage name Shohruhxon, is an Uzbek singer and actor. Honored Artist of the Republic of Uzbekistan (2026)

== Biography ==
Yoldoshev was born in 1985 in the city of Tashkent, to actor Alisher Yoldoshev and Zebo Navrozhva. He has two brothers, one of whom is actor and singer Muhammad Ali Navruzov. In 2003, after graduating from high school, he entered the Tashkent State Theater and Art Institute. He graduated in 2007. Yoldoshev married Uzbek actress Asal Shodieva in 2016. They have two children.

== Career ==
=== Singing career ===
He began his singing career in 2004, and released his first songs in 2006, including "sms" and "Fashion". He has released many more since, which have become very popular.

=== Acting career ===
Yoldoshev started acting in 2006. After several films, In he had a leading role in "Wolves" in 2007 which brought him great popularity. In 2008, he starred in the film "Wolves 2", and has continued to have leading roles in films subsequently.

== In the media ==
Yoldoshev was included in the list of the 10 most desirable people in Uzbekistan in 2009 and 2010 by Bella Terra Uzbekistan magazine. UzDaily named him one of the 5 Most Powerful Male Singers and the Most Popular Singers in 2012 and 2013 respectively. In 2018, he was included in the list of "The Best Central Asia Singers".

== Concert ==
| Year | The name of the concert. | Concert hall | Source |
|---|---|---|---|
| 2015 | Men seni sevaman | People's Friendship Palace | |
| 2016 | Yulduzlar | People's Friendship Palace | |
| 2017 | Zo’rsan | People's Friendship Palace | |
| 2018 | Yoningdaman | People's Friendship Palace | |
| 2022 | Ey yor | People's Friendship Palace | |

== Video clips ==
| Year | Name of the song | Director |
|---|---|---|
| 2006 | „Sms“ | |
| 2006 | „Nigorim“ | |
| 2006 | „Senda edi qalbim“ | |
| 2006 | „Sensiz“ | |
| 2006 | „Moda“ | |
| 2007 | „Boʻrilar“ (Shahriyor bilan) | |
| 2007 | „Qalam qoshli“ | |
| 2007 | „Aprel-may…“ | |
| 2007 | „Yana sogʻinay“ | |
| 2008 | „Quvgʻin“ (Shahriyor bilan) | |
| 2009 | „Leylam“ | |
| 2009 | „Parvona“ | |
| 2010 | „Cancion Del Mariachi (Los Lobos qoʻshigʻiga kaver)“ (Ulugʻbek Rahmatullayev bilan) | |
| 2010 | „Gulilolam“ | Nozim Jumayev |
| 2010 | „Keldim“ | |
| 2010 | „Dajonam“ | Nozim Jumayev |
| 2010 | „Manzillar“ (Dineyra bilan) | Nozim Jumayev |
| 2011 | „Muhabbatnoma“ | Nozim Jumayev Narimon Sultonxoʻjayev |
| 2011 | „Chorla“ | Narimon Sultonxoʻjayev |
| 2011 | „Soʻnggi qoʻngʻiroq“ | |
| 2011 | „Qasos“ (Shahnoz bilan) | |
| 2011 | „Zoʻrsan“ | |
| 2011 | „Alvido“ | Nozim Jumayev Nurimon Sultonxoʻjayev |
| 2012 | „Yigʻlar osmon“(Lola bilan) | |
| 2013 | „Shoshma“ (Shahzoda bilan) | Sarvar Isaev |
| 2014 | „Mening qoʻshigʻim“ | Baxtiyor Latifxoʻjayev Rustam Murodov Yolqin Toʻychiyev |
| 2014 | „Qoʻgʻirchoq“ | Yodgor Nosirov |
| 2014 | „Men seni sevaman“ | Timur Primqulov |
| 2014 | „Mening qoʻshigʻim“ | |
| 2015 | „Yulduzlar“ | Yodgor Nosirov |
| 2015 | „Komila qiz“(Muhriddin Xoliqov qoʻshigʻiga kaver) | Sarvar Isaev |
| 2015 | „Arazlama“ | |
| 2016 | „Yigʻlama“ | |
| 2016 | „Darak yoʻq“ | |
| 2016 | „Yaxshi koʻraman“ | |
| 2016 | „Allo“ (Shahzoda bilan) | Leibniz |
| 2016 | „Aldamadim“ | Rustam Murodov Dilmurod Agzamov |
| 2017 | „Yigʻlama muhabbat“ (Shahriyor va Jahongir Foziljonov bilan) (Shuhrat Hakimov qoʻshigʻiga kaver) | |
| 2017 | „Parizod“ (Muhriddin Xoliqov qoʻshigʻiga kaver) | |
| 2017 | „Yoningdaman“ | Dilmurod Agzamov |
| 2017 | „Jonim dadam“ | |
| 2017 | „Menga farqi yoʻq“ | |
| 2018 | Malikam | |
| 2018 | Yoningdaman | |
| 2018 | Ayamay | |
| 2020 | Unamaydi | |
| 2020 | Achinmayman | |
| 2020 | Yurak | |
| 2021 | Tik-Tok | |
| 2021 | Devona | |
| 2021 | Oddiy bola | |
| 2022 | Telba | |
| 2022 | Kino | Nurimon Sultonxoʻjayev |
| 2022 | Barpo etaman | Nurimon Sultonxoʻjayev |
| 2022 | Qahramon | |
| 2022 | Salom Sevgi | |
| 2023 | Oq libos | |
| 2023 | Oy jamol | |
| 2023 | Esingdami ayt (Afruza) | |
| 2023 | Devona (VIA Marokand) | |
| 2023 | Sevmading | |

== Filmography ==
Below, in chronological order, is a list of movies Yoldoshev appeared in.

Film
| Year | Movie | Role | Explanation | Source |
|---|---|---|---|---|
| 2006 | Romeo va Julʼetta yoxud laʼnatlangan sevgi | Ravshan / Romeo | | |
| 2006 | Yarim baxt | Shohruxxon | | |
| 2006 | Voy dod sumalak | Shohruxxon | Musical film | |
| 2007 | Aprel-may… | | | |
| 2007 | Boʻrilar | Baxtiyor | Crime drama | |
| 2008 | Quvgʻin | Baxtiyor | Crime drama | |
| 2009 | Shaharlik olifta | | | |
| 2010 | Oxirgi qarz | Baxtiyor | Crime drama | |
| 2010 | Ada emas, dada! (Tohir va Zuhra 2 yangi talqin) | Shohruxxon | Musical film | |
| 2010 | Sogʻinch | Ozod | | |
| 2012 | Erka kuyov | Toshpoʻlat | | |
| 2013 | Yor-yor qani? | Shohruxxon | | |
| 2013 | Sen ketma | Shohruxxon | | |
| 2017 | Sayl | Shohruxxon | Musical film | |
| 2022 | Mening toʻyim | | | |
| 2023 | Supper dada | | | |
| 2025 | OVoz O'smirlar | Coach | Winning coach | |

== Awards and nominations ==
| Year | Premium | Nomination | Result |
|---|---|---|---|
| 2010 | "M&TVA" | "The best singer of the year" | Won |
| 2010 | "Star hit parade" radio "Uzbegim taronasy" | Golden disc | Won (Victory for the song "Omoney") |
| 2011 | "M&TVA" | "Best singer of the year" | Singer of the year |
| 2011 | "M&TVA" | "Best music video of the year" | Singer of the year |
| 2011 | Radio "Star Hit Parade" "Uzbegim Taronasi" | "Golden disc" | Won (for the song "Chorla") |
| 2012 | Radio "Star Hit Parade" "Uzbegim Taronasi" | "Golden disc" | Won (for the song "Zoʻrsan") |
| 2015 | "CityTV" | "Best Music Video of the Year" | Won (for the song "Komila qiz") |
| 2016 | "CityTV" | "Best Music Video of the Year" | for the song "Darak yoʻq!" |
| 2016 | "CityTV" | "Best Music Video of the Year" | for the song "Darak yoʻq!" |
| 2016 | "Hits of the season" | "Best Music Video of the Year" | for the song "Darak yoʻq!" |
| 2017 | "Car radio" | "Avrtiv top" | Won |
| 2018 | RizaNova award | | Won |
| 2019 | My5 | Hit singer of the year | Won |
| 2022 | Hits of the season | | Won |

=== State awards ===
Yoldoshev has received many awards. Most notably "Nihol", an Uzbek award to recognize excellence in the music and film industries. He was awarded the "Nihol State Prize" in 2008. He was also awarded the "Etirof" state award in 2017, and Uzbekistan's 30-year independence award.

- Honored Artist of the Republic of Uzbekistan (2026)
