= Murod Nazarov =

Uzbek- businessman, athlete and philanthropist

- Мурад Назаров
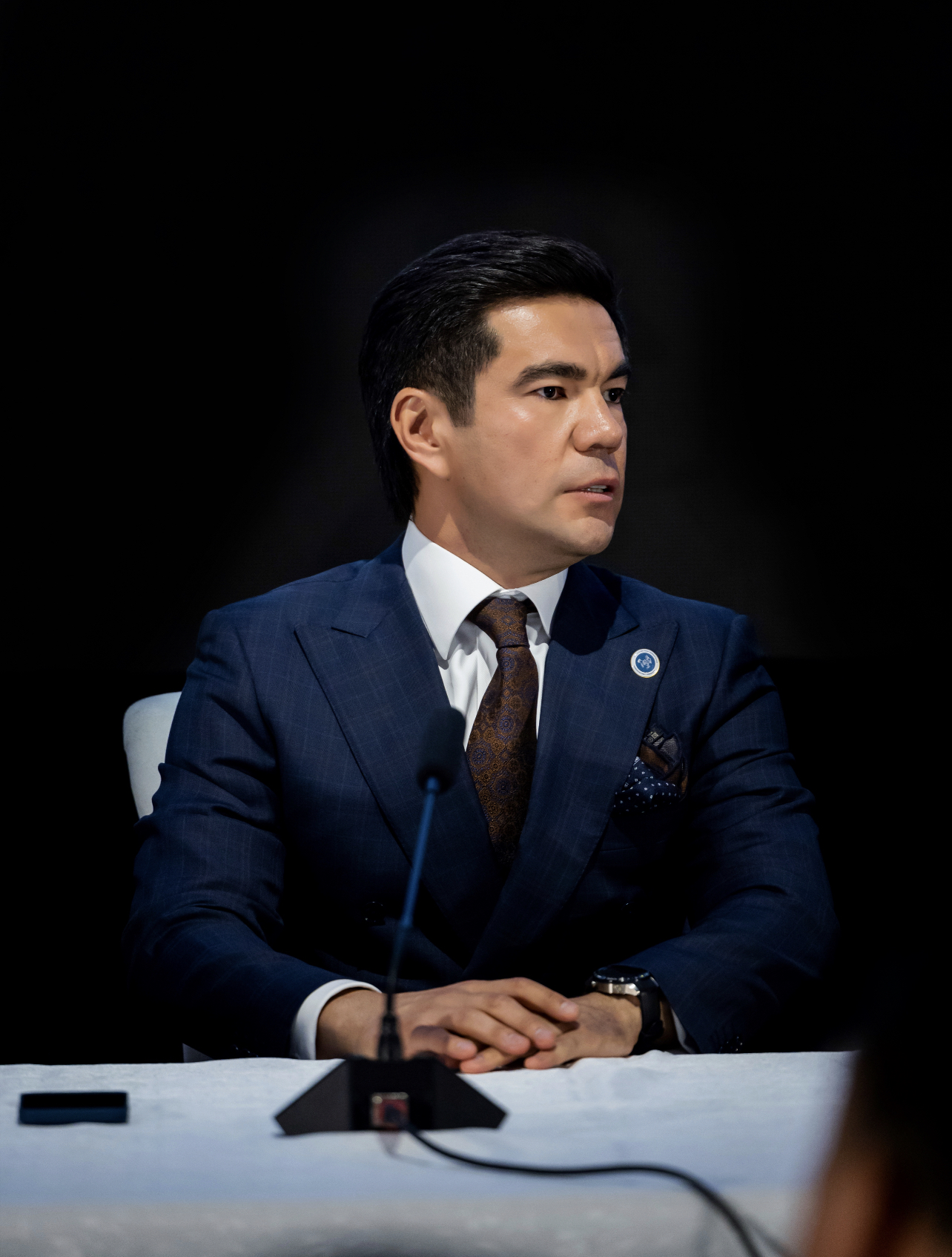
- Born: Murod Nazarov; 16 November 1980 (age 45); Toshkent, Uzbek SSR, USSR
- Citizenship: Uzbekistan
- Education: TSIOS; University of Tsukuba; TSEU
- Known for: Uzbek businessman Vice-president of the polo federation of Uzbekistan
- Spouse: Umida Nazarova
- Awards: 2011 Commemorative plaque "20 years of Independence of Uzbekistan".; Sign "Uzbekistan"; Medal "Shukhrat"; Badge "Mehr-Saxovat" (Generosity and Mercy)

Murod Nazarov (Uzbek: Murod Nazarov, Мурад Назаров; born 16, November, 1980) is an Uzbekistani businessman and vice-president of the polo federation of Uzbekistan

== Biography ==
Murod Nazarov was born on November 16, 1980, in the city of Tashkent. After graduating from high school, in 2001 he graduated from the Tashkent State Institute of Oriental Studies with a bachelor's degree; in 2000–2001 he studied at the University of Tsukuba (Japan). In 2005 he received a master's degree from the Tashkent State Economic University

=== Career ===
Murod Nazarov started his career as a program assistant (Japanese Technical Cooperation Agency) at the JISA office in Uzbekistan. he worked at this position until 2003 and then established his own company. Throughout 2003–2017, Nazarov founded a number of companies in the investment and construction business.

In 2019, Murod Nazarov ran for Tashkent city deputy at the invitation of Tashkent Mayor Jahongir Ortikhojaev. With 70% of the vote, Nazarov won the election. He has been a member of the Tashkent City Council since 2019. In 2019 he signed a contract with the Turkish company Özgüven Mimarlık to build the tallest building in Uzbekistan – NEST ONE.

In 2020, Nazarov opened a joint venture with Kazakh investors. As of 2021, he was the chairman of the venture's board of directors.

In 2022, Nazarov was appointed a member of the supervisory board of the University of World Economy and Diplomacy, and Vice President of the Equestrian Polo Federation of Uzbekistan.

== Personal life ==
Murad Nazarov is married and has 14 children. In 2002 he married Umida Nazarova, with whom he has 3 daughters and 2 sons. In December 2021, Nazarov adopted 9 children (2 boys and 7 girls) from the House of Mercy in Tashkent.

== Awards ==
- 2011 Commemorative plaque "20 years of Independence of Uzbekistan".
- Sign "Uzbekistan" in 2017.
- Medal "Shukhrat" in 2017.
- Badge "Mehr-Saxovat" (Generosity and Mercy) in 2020.
