= Asal Shodiyeva =

- Born: Asal Shodiyeva; April 6, 1992 (age 33)
- Origin: Tashkent, Uzbekistan
- Occupation(s): Actress and singer
- Years active: 2006–present
- Spouse: Shohruxxon (m. 2016)

Asal Shodiyeva (Note: Uzbek: Asal Shodiyeva, Асал Шодиева; Russian: Асал Шодиева, romanized: Asal Shodieva.) (born April 6, 1992) is an Uzbek film actress and singer.

Asal Shodiyeva started her art career in 2006. Asal Shodiyeva became famous in 2008 through the movie "Janob Xech kim".

== Life ==
Asal Shodiyeva was born on April 6, 1992, in Tashkent. In 2003-2008, Shodiyeva studied at the V. A. Uspensky Special Music Academic High School. She studied at the Kamoliddin Behzod Institute of Painting and Design at the Faculty of Interior Design.

== Personal life ==
In 2016, Asal Shodiyeva married the singer Shoxrux Yuldashev, known by his nickname Shohruxxon. Currently, they have children named Muhammad Yusuf and Muhammad Amin.

== Career ==
Asal Shodiyeva started her creative career in 2006. She played her debut role in director Ravil Botirov's film "Paradise is the rule". In 2008, Shodiyeva played one of the main characters in the film "Janob Xech kim", this role brought her great fame and increased the demands for Asal's creativity. In 2009, Shodiyeva started acting in several films. Among them: "Poyma-poy" (Incoherent), "Tango or Lost Suitors", "Dangerous Adventure" and "Marriage" deserved great recognition. In 2010, he starred in the films "The Last Note of Autumn", "Eye of the Heart", "Flying Girl". In 2011, "Jigarbandim", in 2012 "Hay-hai girl", "My mother's dream", "Hello love, goodbye", "Angel of love", "Destiny" films. In 2013, he starred in the films "Panjara", "Race", "Angel of Love 2", "Vafodorim", and "Odnoklassniki.ru". In 2014, Asal Ko'yoshim, "Life Without You Is Boring" and "Until My Last Breath" were released. In 2015, Asal started acting in a single film "Uchrashguncha". In 2016, Asal began to work in the series "Artist" directed by Ayub Shakhobiddinov. In addition, Asal acted in the films "Majnun", "Vakhshiy" and "Courageous Lovers". In 2017, Asal gained momentum in the series called "Saodat". In 2018, the historical film Islamkhoja gained momentum. In 2021, he started acting in the series called Kadir Khan.

== Filmography ==
Below is a chronologically ordered list of films in which Asal Shodiyeva has appeared.

Film
Year	Film	Role	Notes
2006	Jannat qaydadir? (Where is Paradise?)	Luiza	
2008	Mister hech kim (Mr. Nobody)	Oydin	
2009	Poyma-poy (Incoherent)	Asal	
2009	Uylanish (Getting Married)	Durdona	
2009	Tango yoxud adashgan sovchilar (Tango or Errant Matchmakers)	Dilnoza	
2009	Xavfli sarguzasht (A Dangerous Adventure)		
2010	Kuzning soʻnggi notasi (The Last Note of the Fall)		
2010	Qalb koʻzi (The Eye of the Soul)	Nilufar	
2010	Uchar qiz (The Flying Girl)	Alien	
2011	Jigarbandim (My Kin)	Mahbuba	
2012	Hay-hay, qizaloq! (Hey, Hey, Girl!)	Yulduz	
2012	Onaginam orzusi (My Mother's Dream)	Matluba	
2012	Salom sevgi, xayr sevgi (Hello Love, Good-Bye Love)		
2012	Sevgi farishtasi (The Angel of Love)	Dilnoza	
2012	Taqdirlar (Destinies)	Barno	
2013	Panjara (The Grid)		
2013	Poyga (The Race)		
2013	Sevgi farishtasi 2 (The Angel of Love 2)	Dilnoza	
2013	Vafodorim (My Faithful)	Hurliqo	
2013	Odnoklassniki.ru (Odnoklassniki.ru)	Barno	
2014	Koʻz yoshim (My Tears)	Munis	
2014	Sensiz hayot zerikarli (Life is Boring Without You)	Laylo	
2014	Soʻnggi nafasimgacha (Until My Last Breath)	Aziza	
2015	Uchrashguncha (See You Later)		
2016	Majnun (Majnun)	Asal	
2016	Vahshiy (Savage)	Zilola	
2016	Qaysar oshiqlar (Stubborn Lovers)	Shahlo	
2018	Islomxodja	Azizaposhshabika	
2022	Mening toʻyim	?	

Television
Year	Series	Role	Notes
2016	Artist (Artist)	Asal	Cameo
2017	Saodat		
2021	Qodirxon		
2022	Baxt ovchilari		

Music videos
Year	Song title	Artist
2013	"Qani?"	Rayhon
2014	"Masqaraboz"	Radio
2014	"Men seni sevaman"	Shohruhxon
2014	"Mening qoʻshigʻim"	Shohruhxon
2014	"Tanhoginam"	Sardor Rahimxon
2014	"Yana manda, yana sanda"	Sardor Rahimxon
2015	"Sanamjon"	Sardor Rahimxon
2015	"Malikam endi qara"	Sardor Rahimxon
2015	"Yaxshi qol"	Ziyoda Qobilova
2015	"Erkatoy"	Ali Iskandariy
2016	"Qalaysizlar qizlar"	Jasur Umirov
2016	"Yigʻlama"	Shohruhxon
2016	"Darak yoʻq"	Shohruhxon
2019	"Yurak"	Shohruhxon
2020	"Gulim"	Shohruhxon
2020	"Ilk sevgim"	Shohruhxon
2021	"Qaniydi"	Ozoda
2022	"Qahramon"	Shohruhxon

== Discography ==
=== Music videos ===
Year	Title	Director
2014	"Yolgʻizim"	Muhammad Ali Iskandarov
2015	"Chegarasiz"	

== Awards ==
- A new generation, the voice of the future.
- State Recognition Award (Etirof)
- The best actress of 2014
