= Munisa Rizayeva =

Uzbekistani singer and actress (born 1986)

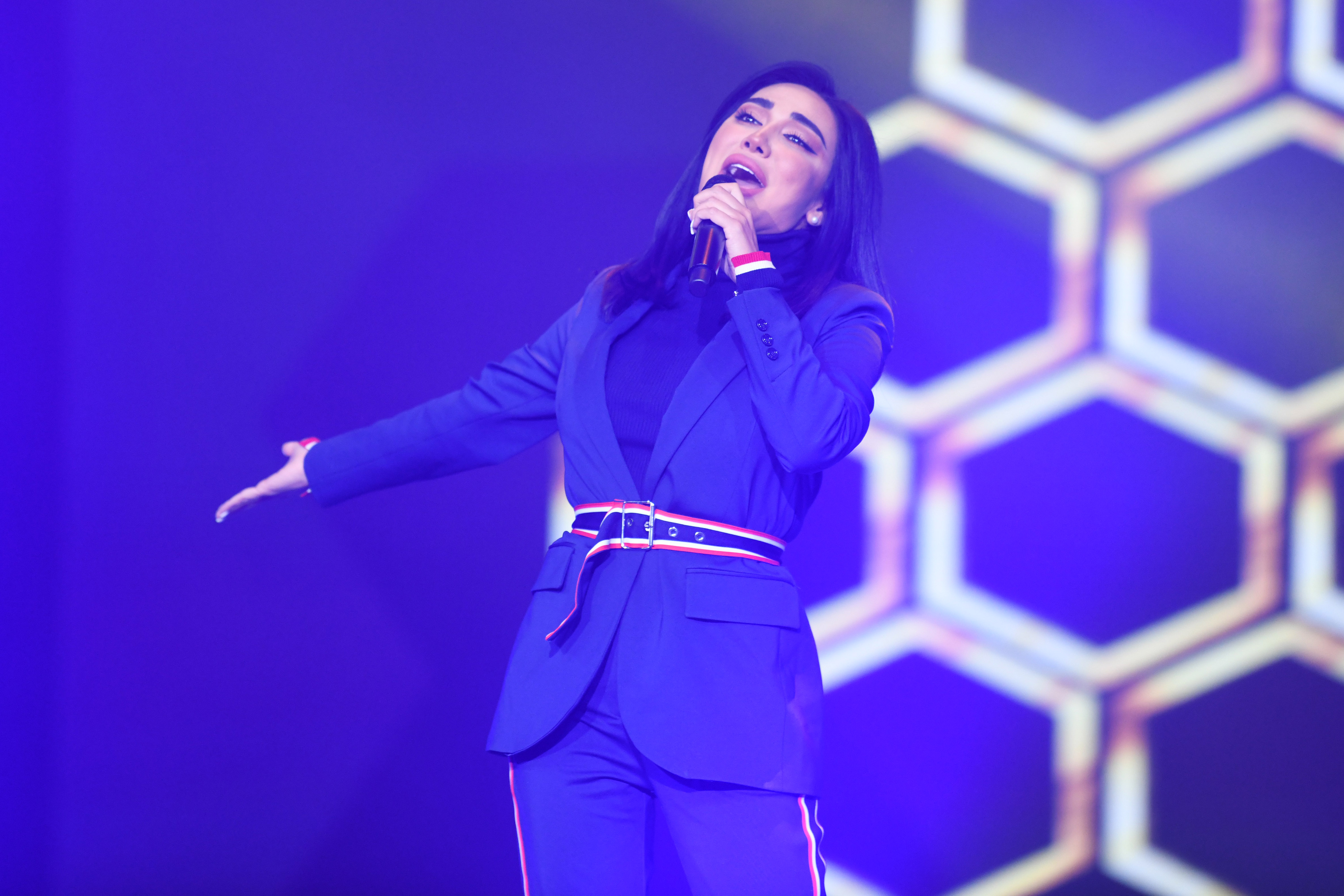
- Munisa in 2022

Background information
- Born: 21 October 1986 (age 39); Tashkent, Uzbek SSR, USSR
- Genres: Pop; Uzbek music
- Occupations: Singer, actress
- Years active: 2007–present

Munisa Rizayeva (Uzbek: Муниса Ризаева; born 21 October 1986) is an Uzbek singer and actress. She is known for the songs "Koʻzlarim yana", "Aha-oho", "Hollywood", "Sekin-asta" and "Ey samo".

== Early and personal life ==
Munisa Rizayeva was born on 21 October 1986 in Tashkent. She was interested in music and dance since childhood. Her mother gave her to the famous dancer, People's Artist of Uzbekistan Malika Ahmedova as an apprentice. Her father did not want her to become a singer, but she also attended other music courses. While she was still in school, she moved with her family to London. Later, Rizayeva studied music at Thames Valley University in London. Then, as a second major, she studied Hotel Business and Tourism at another prestigious university in England. She owns a hotel in Tashkent.

In July 2023, Rizayeva announced her engagement to Belarusian Arseniy Moroz. The wedding ceremony took place on 7 September 2023 in Tashkent. On 24 November 2024, she experienced the joy of motherhood for the first time and gave birth to a son.

== Career ==
Rizayeva, who returned to Uzbekistan in 2010, began performing on stage in 2011. Her first successful song was "Ayrilma, yor", which attracted the attention of a wide audience. In 2012, she presented her first album.

Rizayeva gained popularity in Uzbekistan and neighboring countries with her songs such as "Ko'zlarim yana", "Aha-oho", "Hollywood", "Ey samo", and "Sekin-asta".

She has also acted in several films, including 2012's Hay hay, qizaloq! (Hey, Hey, Girl!) and Salom Natasha from 2014.
