= Hayot afsunlari =

2022 film by Khasan Alijonov

- Directed by: Khasan Alijonov
- Written by: Abduqayum Yuldoshev
- Produced by: Djavlon Kamolov
- Starring: Tohir Saidov: Shoxrux Hamdamov; Lola Eltoyeva; Ilmira Rahimjonova, Nigina Anorboyeva
- Cinematography: Iste’dod Usmonov
- Music by: Doniyor Agzamov
- Distributed by: Uzbekfilm
- Release date: 6 December 2021
- Running time: 108 minutes
- Country: Uzbekistan
- Language: Uzbek

Hayot afsunlari is a 2021 Uzbek drama film directed by Khasan Alijonov. It brings together actors Tahir Saidov and Shoxrux Hamdamov, who play the role of a professional fraudster who is forced to work together on a job, despite the fact that they prefer to work as people who endure life's trials. The film also stars Lola Eltoyeva, Ilmira Rahimjonova and Nigina Anorboyeva.

== Premise ==
The movie "HAYOT AFSUNLARI" is about the activities of the neighborhood, and based on the events, the work being done to develop the neighborhood institution is described.

== Cast ==
- Tohir Saidov
- Shoxrux Hamdamov
- Lola Eltoyeva
- Ilmira Rahimjonova
- Nigina Anorboyeva
- Gulruh Pirnazarova
- Bahodir Murodov.

== Production ==
Djavlon Kamolov announced the film in 2019. He also confirmed via Instagram that the film would star his brother-in-law Tohir Saidov and would be directed by Khasan Alijonov. Saidmalik Kadirov was confirmed as the second director.

The film's principal photography commenced with Tohir Saidov in November 2019, and Shoxrux Hamdamov joined the sets in December 2019 and the second schedule in 2021. Filming was wrapped up in 2021, but later Shohrux's some more scenes were added-on to the movie and Shohrux shot that scenes in the first week of May 2021.
