= Muhammad Ali Navruzov =

Actor

MukhammadAli Nuruzov
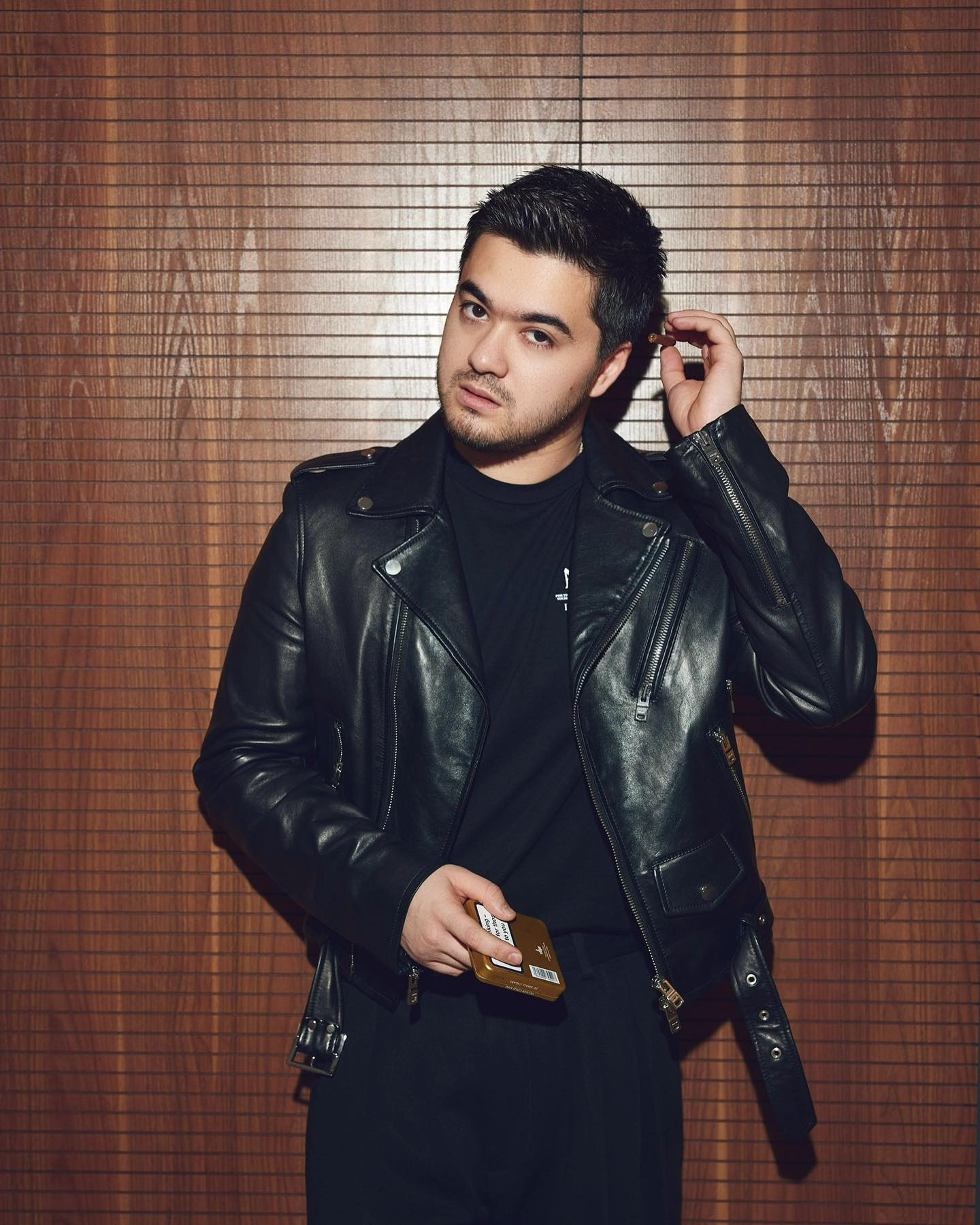

Background information
- Born: Mukhammad Ali Nuruzov; August 23, 1991 (age 34); Tashkent, Uzbekistan
- Occupations: Singer, actor
- Years active: 2006–present
- Label: RizaNova

MukhammadAli Nuruzov (Uzbek: Muhammad Ali Navroʻzov, Мухаммад Али Наврўзов; born August 23, 1991, Tashkent, Uzbekistan), most commonly known by his stage name Mukhammad Ali, is an Uzbek singer and actor. Ali achieved great success in the field of acting. Muhammad Ali gained widespread recognition and recognition in Uzbekistan after starring in the 2008 Uzbek drama "Yigitlar". Since then, he has starred in many Uzbek comedy films. In particular, the films "Shaharlik olifta", which was released on the big screens in 2010, and "Oxirgi qarz" brought the actor great popularity.

Muhammad Ali became famous in Uzbekistan in 2009 with the song "Xato" as a singer. Since 2015, Muhammad Ali has written songs in Uzbek, Russian and English languages.

== Biography ==
Muhammad Ali Yuldashev was born on August 23, 1991, in Tashkent. His mother, Zebo Navruzova, is a film director, and his brothers Shohruhkhon and Shuhrat are singers. Muhammad Ali graduated from the Khamza Music School No. 3 and the Tashkent Variety and Circus School, then entered the Tashkent State Institute of Culture named after Abdulla Qadiri.

In 2006, he made his debut role in the film "The Oath" (Qasamyod). He started his professional career in 2009.

Muhammad Ali Navruzov is known as a singer under the pseudonym Ali.

== Discography ==
=== Singles ===
- 2009 Xato
- 2018 Lambo
- 2019 Do Utra (feat. Massa)
- 2020 Yana-Yana
- 2020 Bon appetite
- 2020 Dekabr
- 2021 Onam
- 2021 Yuragim
- 2021 Xop- xop
- 2023 Necha Bora Ketarding(feat Shohruhxon)

== Filmography ==
Year	English name	Original name	Role
2008	Guys	Yigitlar	
2008	Persecution	Quvg'in	
2009	Error	Xato	
2010	The City Fop	Shaharlik olifta	
2010	Last debt	Oxirgi qarz	
2012	Dear	Mehribonim	
2012	The groom	Erka kuyov	
2012	Onaizor	Onaizor	
2014	Yigitali	Yigitali	
2014	Wolf	Qashqir	
2015	In my sliceless tongue	Tilimdamas dilimda	
2019	Jackal	Shoqol	
2020	Malikam	Malikam	
2022	Mening toʻyim		
2023	Malikam 2		
2023	Supper dada		
