= Shahzoda =

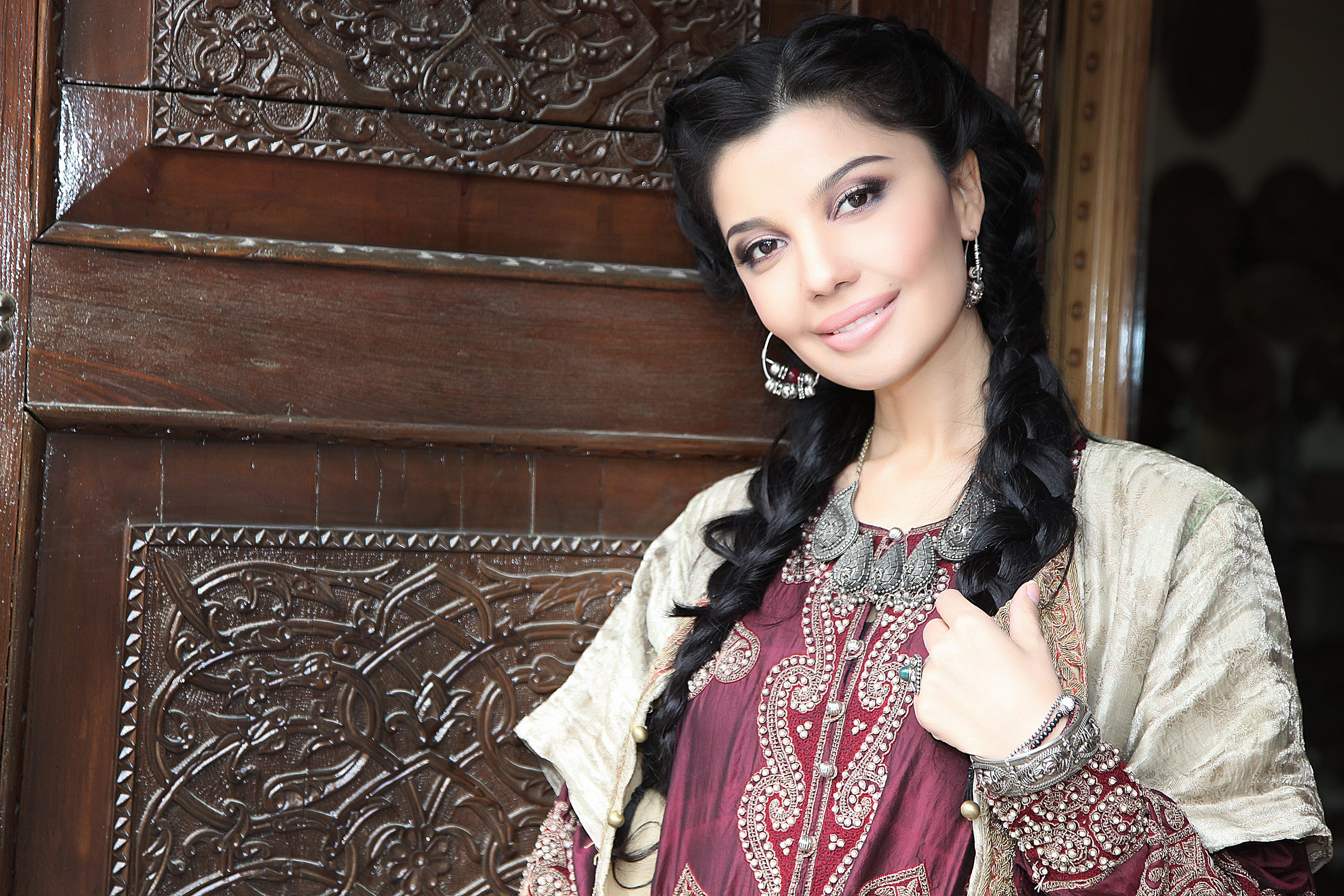
- Shahzoda

Background information
- Born: Zilola Bahodirovna Musayeva; 28 July 1979 (age 47); Fergana, Uzbek SSR, Soviet Union
- Origin: Tashkent, Uzbekistan
- Genres: Pop; Uzbek music
- Occupations: Singer, actress
- Years active: 1998–present
- Label: RizaNova
- Formerly of: Jonim
- Website: shahzoda.uz

Zilola Bahodirovna Musaeva (Uzbek: Zilola Bahodirovna Musayeva, Зилола Баҳодировна Мусаева; born 28 July 1979), most commonly known by her stage name Shahzoda, is an Uzbek singer and actress. Shahzoda has become a highly popular singer in Uzbekistan and other neighboring countries.

In the early 2010s, Shahzoda gained some fame in Russia. She has recorded songs in Uzbek, Russian, Persian, Kazakh, Tajik, and English.

== Personal life ==
Zilola Musaeva was born on 28 July 1979, in Fergana. She is married to Ravshanbek Yuldashev and she has two children.

== Music career ==
Before her solo career, Shahzoda was one of two members of the pop band "Jonim". They came to fame with their song "Qarama koʻzlarimga" ("Don't Look at My Eyes") in 1998. The band separated two years later and both Shahzoda and Aziza launched successful solo careers.

Shahzoda's first single "Bor ekan" became a hit in Uzbekistan and she gained fame in pop culture. Following the success of "Bor ekan" Shahzoda released her first album with the same title in 2002. The album became one of the best selling albums of the year.

Shahzoda's second album Baxt boʻladi was released in 2003 and became another hit album for her. Shahzoda's third album Keragimsan was released in 2004 and sold more than 25,000 copies in its first week. Album's first single "Keragimsan" was released in May 2004 on Vodiy Sadosi radio. It became a hit in Uzbekistan. Singles such as "Baxtliman", "Sevgi", "Tamannozi" became hits on radio and TV channels. "Qayt", which is a duet with the well-known Uzbek rapper Shohruh, also became a hit and received positive views from critics. Album's single "Hayot ayt" was chosen as a soundtrack to the Uzbek movie Fotima va Zuhra in which Shahzoda played the lead role.

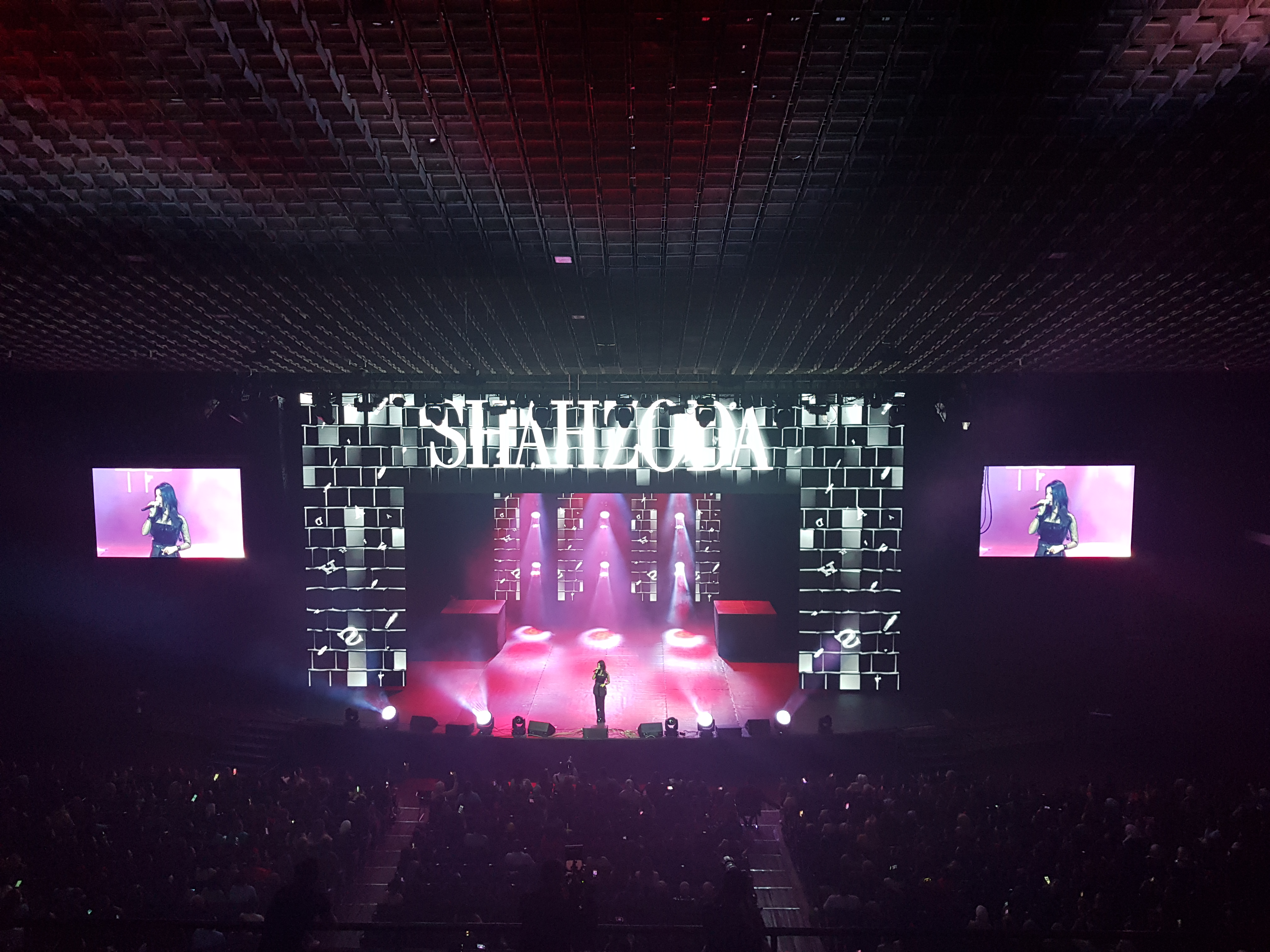
Shahzoda performing in Bishkek in 2019

Shahzoda's fourth album Baxtliman, which was released in 2005, sold more than 50,000 copies in its first week. The album's first single "Keragimsan" was released on radio channels and was received well by fans. Singles such as "Baxtliman", "Faqat sen", "Layli va Majnun" also became hits.

Shahzoda has sung a few songs in the Tajik language, such "Manu tanho" and "Naghz mebinam", and they have been received well by Tajik fans. Her song with Shahriyor, another well-known rapper, "Birinchi sevgi" did well in charts on Uzbek TV channels.

Shahzoda has gained some fame in Russia. Her first single "1000 i Odna Noch (Russian: 1000 и одна ночи)" and "Mezhdu Nebom I Zemley" (Feat. Dj Smash) were received well by Russian fans. The video of the song has been played by many Russian Music Channels, including RU-TV.

Shahzoda's studio album entitled Qora koʻzlaring was entirely written and produced by the band Benom (Nameless).

In December 2011 Shahzoda was recognized as "The Best Artist in Central Asia and Caucasus" at Big Apple Music Awards held in New York City.

In 2012, Shahzoda started releasing songs in English, such as "Afghana", "All Alone feat Akcent", and "Flying Tonight." "Flying Tonight", which was produced by DJ Sean Bay, was uploaded to YouTube on 12 January 2012.

While it was initially revealed on 12 November 2013 that Shahzoda would represent Uzbekistan at the Turkvision Song Contest 2013 with the song "Medlenno", she was later replaced by Nilufar Usmonova with the song "Unutgin".

== Acting career ==
Shahzoda has portrayed main characters in several Uzbek movies., in which Shahzoda played the lead role, did well in box office and Shahzoda received positive reviews for her role. She also played the leading role in the 2007 Uzbek movie "Zumrad va Qimmat". The soundtrack for the movie "Orzular" was sung by Shahzoda herself. Shahzoda played at movie celled O Maryam, Maryam which was popular among uzbek people.

|align="left"|Unutmadim |- |2010 |align="left"|Tilayman |- |2011 |align="left"|Qora koʻzlaring |- |2013 |align="left"|Bu muhabbat |- |2014 |align="left"|Sen menga kerak |- |2015 |align="left"|Rahmat hayot |- |}

== Filmography ==
This is a chronologically-ordered list of films in which Shahzoda has appeared.

Year	Title	Role	Notes
2000	Tohir va Zuhra yangi talqin	Zuhra	Musical
2004	Sevinch	Nargiza	
2004	Xavfli burilish	Herself	guest appearance
2004	Sarvinoz	Sarvinoz	
2006	Fotima va Zuhra	Zuhra	
2006	Voy dod sumalak	Zilola	Musical
2007	Zumrad va Qimmat	Zumrad	
2010	Majruh	Sevara	
2011	Nafs	Herself	Cameo
2012	O Maryam, Maryam	Maryam	
2016	Sharofatxonning kelinlari yoxud Navro′z muborak	Herself	guest appearance

== Music videos ==
Year	Song	Director
2002	"Yurak sezar"	
2002	"Baxt boʻladi"	
2005	"Hayot ayt"	Yodgor Nosirov
2005	"Qayt" (feat. Shoxrux)	
2005	"Umidvor"	
2005	"Oʻkinch"	
2005	"Sevgi"	
2006	"Birinchi sevgi" (feat. Shahriyor)	Yodgor Nosirov
2006	"Faqat sen"	Yodgor Nosirov
2006	"Kechalar"	Jasur Shametov
2006	"Yoʻq-yoʻq"	Jasur Shametov
2007	"Arman"	
2007	"Assalomu alaykum"	Yodgor Nosirov
2007	"Ayirma"	
2007	"Orzular"	Jasur Shametov
2007	"Paxtakor"	Yodgor Nosirov
2007	"Огни Алматы"	Jasur Shametov
2008	"Тысяча и одна ночь"	Bakhodir Yuldashev
2009	"Erkala"	Bahrom Berdiev
2009	"Quchgin"	Jasur Shametov
2009	"Unutmadim"	Jasur Shametov
2009	"Между небом и землей" (feat. DJ Smash)	Jasur Shametov
2010	"Layli va Majnun"	Jasur Shametov
2010	"Nagʻzme binam"	Jasur Shametov
2010	"Ol yuragimni"	Jasur Shametov
2010	"Tilayman"	
2010	"Toʻrt qadam"	Abduvohid Ganiev
2010	"Люблю тебя"	Pavel Khudyakov
2011	"Biz yagona"	
2011	"Qora koʻzlaring"	Yodgor Nosirov
2011	"Yoqasan"	Jasur Shametov
2011	"Все только начинается"	
2012	"Bahor"	Jasur Shametov
2012	"Flying Tonight" (feat. Sean Bay)	Mustafa Makhdi
2012	"Ayt"	Calin Moraru
2013	"Bu muhabbat"	Aleksandr Syutkin
2013	"Chicco"	Sanjar Matkarimov; Javlon Turdikhodjaev
2013	"Habibi" (feat. Ruxshona Matkarimova)	Yodgor Nosirov
2013	"Hands in the Air"	Yodgor Nosirov
2013	"Ishon"	
2013	"Tirikmanmi?"	Yodgor Nosirov
2013	"Qoʻllar tepaga"	
2013	"Shoshma"	
2013	"Toʻkilib"	Yodgor Nosirov
2013	"Давай до свидания"	
2013	"Как без тебя"	
2013	"Медленно"	
2013	"Мой золотой" (feat. Dr. Costi)	
2014	"Qaynona"	
2014	"Sen menga kerak"	
2014	"Yor-Yorlar"	Yodgor Nosirov
2014	"Yurak"	Javlon Turdikhodjaev
2014	"Мало ли"	
2014	"Shunchaki"	Benom Media
2014	"Habibi (Улыбнись и все ОK)" (feat. Faydee and Dr. Costi)	
2015	"Super Lady (Bari Gal)" (feat. Jasur Gaipov)	Yodgor Nosirov
2015	"Ayrilamiz"	Benom Media
2015	"Chiccita (Chicco 2)"	Javlon Turdikhodjaev; Sarvar Isaev; Izzatulla Lutfullaev
2015	"Mon cheri"	Timur Primkulov
2015	"Rashk" (feat. Ulugʻbek Rahmatullayev)	Yodgor Nosirov
2015	"Maqtanchoq" (feat. Bojalar)	
2015	"Déjà vu"	Yodgor Nosirov
2015	"Мое чудо"	
2015	"Hırka" (feat. Sinan Akçıl)	Timur Primkulov
2015	"Layli va Majnun" (feat. DJ Piligrim)	
2016	"Sirdoshim"	
2016	"Ket" (feat. Shoxrux)	
2016	"Oʻzbegim"	Benom Media
2016	"Linda" (feat. TWO)	
2016	"Xasta"	Benom Media
2016	"Pari"	
2016	"Allo" (feat. Shohruhxon)	Yodgor Nosirov
2016	"Ming shukur"	
2017	"Kuyov va kelinchak"	
2017	"Billionaire" (feat. Dr. Costi)	
2017	"Yomgʻir"	
2017	"Чинара" (fear. Farrukh Zokirov)	
2018	"Aldagan sen"	
2018	"Jajji qizaloq"	
2018	"Men oʻsha”	

== Awards ==
Shahzoda has received many awards. Most notably "Nihol" which is an Uzbek award given to recognize excellence of professionals in the music and film industries. She has received many Tarona Records Awards, including Best Female Singer, Best Song, Best Lyrics, Best video, Best Collaboration, and Best Design.
