= Dilshod Niyazov =

Professional Uzbek bodybuilder (born 1988)

- ♂ Professional bodybuilder
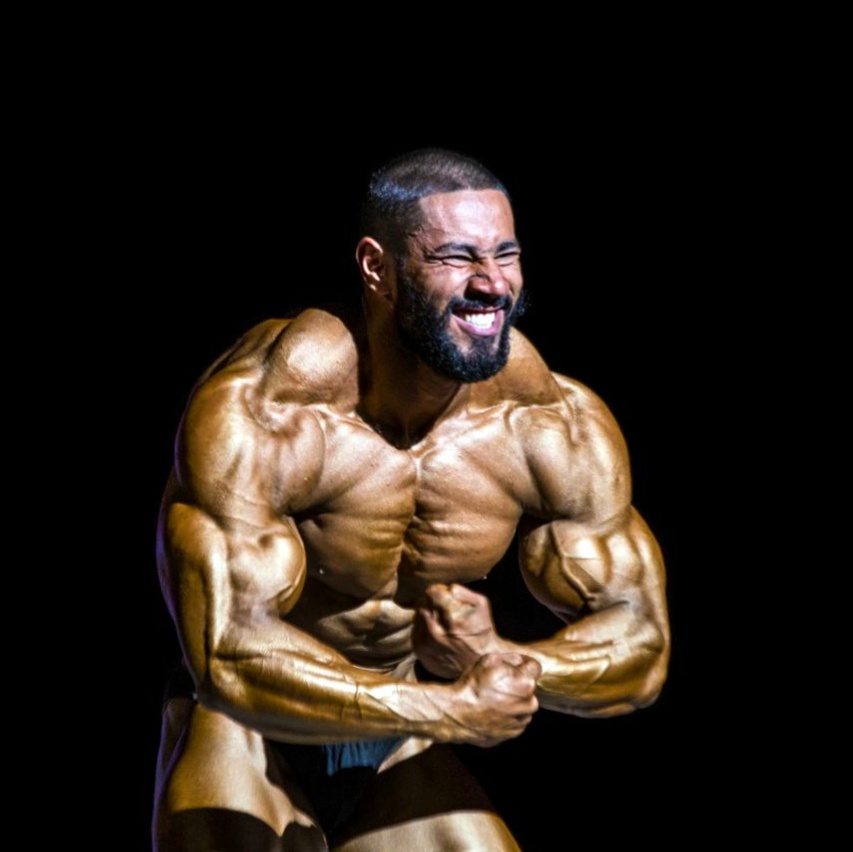

Personal info
- Born: 9 March 1988 (age 38); Kokand, Fergana Region, Uzbek SSR, USSR

Best statistics
- Height: 175 cm (5 ft 9 in)
- Weight: Contest: 85 kg 187 lb Off season 95 kg 209 lb

Professional (Pro) career
- Pro-debut: IFBB MEN'S WORLD CHAMPIONSHIPS; 2010
- Best win: Arnold Classics NPC; 2019
- Active: 2009

Dilshod Niyazov (Russian: Дильшод Ниязов; born 9 March 1988) is an Uzbek professional bodybuilder, trainer and Master of Sports of Uzbekistan in bodybuilding. 2013–2015 years President of Andijan Region Bodybuilding Federation and 2015–2017 years President of Bodybuilding Association of Fergana region. In 2012 he graduated Andijan State Medical Institute.

== Biography ==
Niyazov started his bodybuilding career in 2009, by participating in the National Championships of Uzbekistan. His first international championship held in Baku, Azerbaijan and he took 5th place of Asian Amateur Fitness and Bodybuilding Championships. In 2017 he showed better results at 9th World Bodybuilding and Fitness Championships in Ulaanbaatar. He achieved his best result at Arnold Classics by getting 3rd place of tournament at Classic Physique Class B.

== Competitions ==
2008 - Uzbekistan Open Championships 2nd (Tashkent, Uzbekistan)

2010 - Asian Amateur Championships - IFBB - Welterweight - 5th (Baku, Azerbaijan)

2009 - Mr.Asia 3rd Asian Bodybuilding Championship - 3rd (Aurangabad, India)

2010 - World Amateur Championships - IFBB - WelterWeight - (Budapest, Hungary)

2012 - Uzbekistan Cup Bodybuilding up to 80 kg 2nd (Tashkent, Uzbekistan)

2017- 9th World Bodybuilding and Fitness Championships - 5th (Ulaanbaatar, Mongolia)

2017 - 51st Asian Bodybuilding and Physique Sports Championships - 2nd (Seoul, Korea)

2019 - Arnold Classics: AMATEUR NPC USA Classic Physique – Class B 3rd (Columbus, USA)
