= Nodirbek Primqulov =

Uzbek singer and actor (born 1998)

Nodirbek Primqulov Нодирбек Примкулов
- Born: September 18, 1998 (age 27); Namangan, Uzbekistan
- Citizenship: Uzbekistan
- Occupations: Singer, actor
- Years active: 2012–present
- Style: Folk rock, Pop
- Awards: Orders, decorations, and medals of Uzbekistan

Nodirbek Primqulov (Uzbek: Нодирбек Примкулов; born September 18, 1998) is an Uzbek pop singer and actor.

Primqulov became widely known in 2016 with his song "Yomg’irlar".

== Early life ==
Primqulov was born on September 18, 1998, in the city of Namangan. From 2005 to 2008, he studied at school no. 34 in Namangan. From 2014 to 2017, he studied at the Namangan academic lyceum.

== Career ==
In early 2016, Primqulov released his first song, "Chiroilisan". At the end of 2016, he released a song called "Yomgirlar". In 2017, Primqulov released "Maryamjon". In 2018, Primqulov's song "Ramozan" was released. At the beginning of 2019, Primkulov released his song "Valley of Legends," which was received well by fans. At the end of 2019, he released "Namangon", and in 2022, he released a song called "Heart". In 2022, he also released the songs "Onamni Kelini" and "Gozal".

== Singles ==
- "Yomg’irlar"
- "Chiroylisan"
- "Marjona"
- "Ramozon"
- "Afsonalar vodisi"
- "Qadri osmonim"
- "Namangan"
- "Xodisa"
- "Yurak"
- "Go’zal-go’zal"
- "Onamning kelini"

== Discography ==
=== Studio albums ===
Year	Albums
2022	Qadri osmonim

== Filmography ==
Movies
Year	Title in Russian	Name in Uzbek	Role	Notes
2014	Сумалак	Sumalak sayli	Nodirbek	Musical film
2015	Канун Нового года	Yangili Oqshomi	Murod
2016	Навроз	Navroz sayli	Bek	Musical film
2017	Любимый новый год	Sevimli yangi yil	Aziz	Musical film
2018	С Новым Годом	Zo’r yangi yil	Nodir	Musical film
2019	Прекрасная новогодняя ночь	Sevimli yangi yil oqshomi	Nodirbek
2021	С Новым Годом	Zo’r yangi yil	Singer	Musical film
