= Order of Friendship (Uzbekistan) =

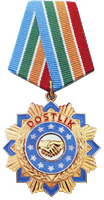
- Type: Individual/Organizational Award
- Presented by: Uzbekistan
- Established: May 6, 1994
- Ribbon

Precedence
- Next (higher): Shon-Sharaf Order

The Order of Friendship (Uzbek: Doʻstlik ordeni), also known as the Dustlik Order, is a state order awarded by the government of Uzbekistan. It is restricted to non‑nationals. The order was established on the initiative of the President of Uzbekistan Islam Karimov at a session of the Supreme Council of Uzbekistan held on 5–6 May 1994. It is awarded to individuals for achievements in strengthening friendship, brotherhood, and mutual agreement between representatives of all nations and peoples, and for their contribution to the development of friendship and cooperation between the peoples of Uzbekistan.

== Recipients ==
Recipient	Date	Citizenship	Ref
Chinghiz Aitmatov	30 August 1995	Kyrgyzstan	
Sepp Blatter	29 March 2007	Switzerland	
Trent Kelly	29 August 2019	United States	
Sergey Lavrov	28 March 2020	Russia	
Raşit Meredow	26 August 2022	Turkmenistan	

== See also ==
- Orders, decorations, and medals of Uzbekistan
