= Diyor Mahkamov =

Uzbek singer, producer, actor

- Uzbek: Diyor Mahkamov
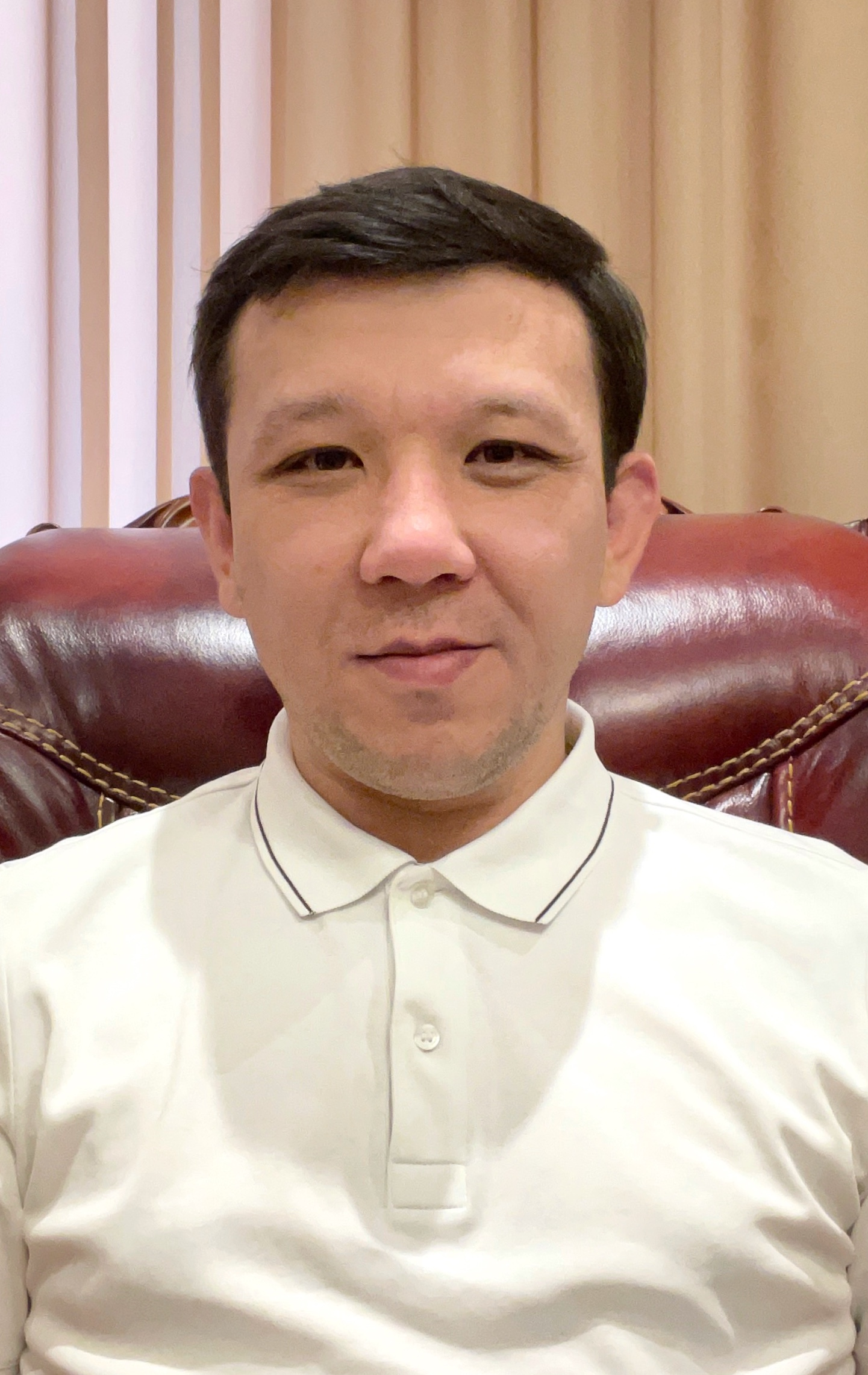
- Born: Diyor Makhkamov Daniyarovich; 3 November 1987 (age 38); Tashkent, Uzbekistan
- Citizenship: Uzbekistan
- Education: Tashkent State University of Economics
- Occupations: Singer, actor, producer
- Years active: 1998–present
- Style: Folk rock, Pop
- Spouse: Nigora Mahkamova
- Children: 3
- Relatives: Elyor Mahkamov (brother)
- Awards: Nihol-2006, "Barkamol avlod", "30th anniversary of independence of Uzbekistan

Diyor Mahkamov (sometimes spelled Diyor Makhkamov in English; Uzbek: Diyor Mahkamov, Диёр Махкамов; born 3 November 1987) is an Uzbek pop singer and actor. The singer was awarded "Badge of Uzbekistan", 30th anniversary of independence of Uzbekistan.

In addition to singing, Diyor also play roles in films. Diyor played his first starring role in the 1999 film "Muhabbat Sinovlari 1".

== Biography ==
Diyor Mahkamov was born on 3 November 1987 in Tashkent. From 1994 to 2005, he studied at the secondary school in Tashkent. He then in 2005, entered the university and graduated from the Tashkent State University of Economics in 2009. The singer married Nigora Mahkamova in 2006 and today they have 3 children.

== Career ==
=== Singing career ===
Diyor Mahkamov began his singing career in 1998 and continues to this day. Diyor released his first songs in 1998. His song about orphans caused a great deal of controversy. There were rumors that the singer was an orphan. Diyor later said in an interview that the rumors were false. In 2001, the singer released his debut albom "Kutaman". In the same year, he gave a solo concert at the Turkestan Palace of Arts in Tashkent.

In 2003, he released the album "Bolaligim hayr endi" (Goodbye My Childhood). Then he gave his second solo concert in 2003 in the winter hall of the Turkestan Palace of Arts in Tashkent. After that, there was a break in the singer's career. He studied at the university and got married. But he was photographed in the films this period.

=== Acting career ===
Diyor has portrayed main characters in several Uzbek movies. Muhabbat Sinovlari 1 and Muhabbat Sinovlari 1, in which Diyor played the lead role, did well in box office and Diyor received positive reviews for his role, despite being his debut films. He then starred in several other films, including Yigitlar (Guys) in 2008, Baxt ortidan (After happiness) in 2014, Kunlardan bir kun (One of the days) in 2016, Majnun (Crazy) and Virus (Virus) in 2017.

== Discography ==
=== Studio albums ===
- Kutaman (2001)
- Bolaligim hayr endi (2003)

== Music videos ==
Year	Song	Director
2004	"Xalq uchun"	
2004	"Vatan" (feat. Shuhrat Qayumov, Dilfuza Rahimova)	
2004	"Gururim" (feat. Lola, Munisa Rizayeva and Jurabek)	
2008	"Bilmaysan"	Dilmurod Turdiboyev
2008	"Imkon"	Bekzod Tojiyev
2009	"Ketaman"	Rustam Sagdiev
2010	"Balki" (feat. Madina Mumtoz)	
2012	"Yolgizim"	Dilmurod Turdiboyev
2012	"Bolalarning onasi" (feat. Shuhrat Qayumov)	
2013	Shoshilmagin (feat. Manzura)	
2015	"Devonang" (feat. Shahzoda Muhammedova)	Muhammad Ali Iskandarov
2015	"Ket" (feat. Faridam)	
2015	"Sevgimiz" (feat. Aziza Nizomova)	
2016	"Sen kerak"	
2016	"Sevar edim"	Jahongir Ahmedov
2017	"Mustahkam oila" (Shuhrat Qayumov)	

== Filmography ==
In addition to singing, Diyor Mahkamov also tried his hand at acting and starred in several films. This is a chronologically-ordered list of films in which Diyor has appeared.

Film
Year	Film	Source
1999	Muhabbat Sinovlari 1	
2002	Muhabbat sinovlari 2	
2008	Yigitlar	
2014	Baxt ortidan	
2016	Kunlardan bir kun	
2017	Majnun	
2017	Virus	

== Awards ==
- Winner "Istiqlol umidlari-2005"
- Winner "Nihol-2006".
- Winner "Barkamol avlod-2008"
- 30th anniversary of independence of Uzbekistan
