= Sevara Nazarkhan =

Uzbek singer, songwriter, and musician (born 1976)

Sevara Nazarkhan Sevara Nazarxonova Anvarjonovna
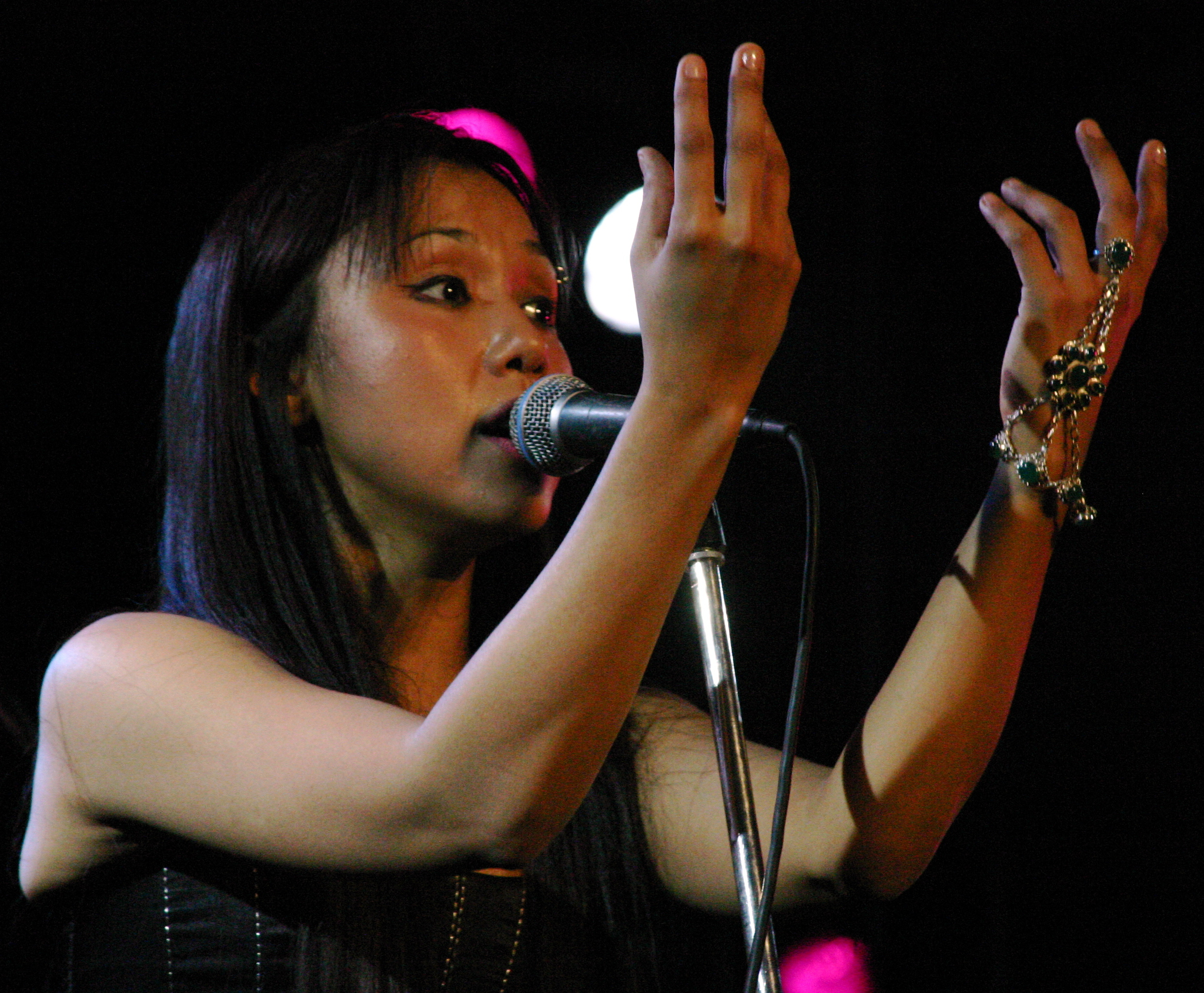
- Sevara Nazarkhan (2006)

Background information
- Born: 23 December 1976 (age 49)
- Origin: Asaka, Uzbek SSR, USSR
- Genre: Uzbek music
- Occupations: Singer, songwriter, musician
- Labels: Real World Records, Sevaramusic
- Website: www.sevara.uz

Sevara Nazarkhan (Uzbek: Sevara Nazarxon, Севара Назархон) is an Uzbek singer, songwriter, and musician. She is awarded as People's artist of Uzbekistan. Her musical style incorporates Uzbek folk and contemporary music. Nazarkhan has achieved worldwide fame and has collaborated with high-profile international artists. In 2004, Nazarkhan received the BBC Radio 3 World Music Award in the category "Best Asian Artist".

== Work ==
Nazarkhan started her solo career in 2000. In 2003, she released her critically acclaimed album Yoʻl boʻlsin on the UK label Real World Records. The album was produced by French producer Hector Zazou. Following the release, she extensively toured Europe and Asia with her band. She also was the support act in Peter Gabriel's Growing Up Tour 2004. The same year, she received the BBC Radio 3 World Music Award in the category "Best Asian Artist".

In 2004, Sevara recorded Goʻzal dema – a collection of folk songs. It was a limited edition CD. In 2007, Real World Records releases her album Sen. Most of the music of that album was composed by Sevara. She brought two producers to work on this album – Bruno Ellingham and Victor Sologoub. In 2009, Sevara released a hit song titled "А Он Не Пришёл" in Russian, which became a major hit throughout the CIS countries.

Sevara's Tortadur – a collection of Uzbek traditional/classical songs – was released in the US on 11 October 2011, on her own record label, Sevaramusic. Sevara invited "the old school" instrumentalists for the live recording sessions. This album is not electronically treated.

In 2012 Sevara participated in the Russian version of "The Voice" show.

Sevara Nazarkhan appears on the following tracks/albums:

1. Peace Song (Halla Bassam/Sevara Nazarxon) From the album Lullabies from the Axis of Evil;
2. In Your Eyes (Peter Gabriel), Peter Gabriel – Growing Up Live (2003) DVD;
3. My Secret Bliss (Iarla Duet With Sevara Nazarxon) – AfroCelt Sound System. From the album Volume 5: Anatomic (2005);
4. Everything Comes From You (feat. Richard Evans, Joji Hirota, Sevara Nazarxon, Sinéad O'Connor, Guo Yue) – From the album Big Blue Ball by Peter Gabriel.

In 2024, Nazarkhan was awarded the Order of Friendship by decree of Russian President Vladimir Putin.

== Filmography ==
Film
Year	Film	Role	Notes
2000	Tohir va Zuhra yangi talqin (Tohir and Zuhra new interpretation)	Zuhra	Musical
200...	Maysara super yulduz (Maysara Superstar)	Maysara	Musical theatre
2014	Ko'rgim keladi	Ziyoda Aliyeva	Singing

== Discography ==
- Yoʻl boʻlsin (Where are you Headed?) (2003)
- Goʻzal dema (Don't Say I'm Beautiful) (2004)
- Sen (You) (2007)
- Tortadur (It Attracts) (2011)
- Maria Magdalena (2012)
- Pisma (2013)
- 2019 (2019)
- Humo Arena (Live) (2021)
- Otajonimsiz (2023)
- Gul Ochilsa (2024)
- Bahtimdan (2024)
- Ruh(Live) (2026)
