= Ziyoda Qobilova =

Ziyoda Зиёда
- Born: Ziyoda O’tkirovna Qobilova; January 7, 1989 (age 37); Tashkent, Uzbek SSR, USSR
- Genres: Pop, ska, pop rock, electropop, R&B
- Occupations: Singer–songwriter and actress
- Years active: 2005–present
- Labels: RizaNova

Ziyoda O’tkirovna Qobilova (Uzbek: Ziyoda O’tkirovna Qobilova, Зиёда Ўткировна Қобилова) (born 7 January 1989), most commonly known by her stage name Ziyoda, is a popular Uzbek singer, actress and honored artist of Uzbekistan. She sings in Uzbek, Hindi and Persian. She has also become famous outside of Uzbekistan thanks to a cover of Ruslana's song Wild Dances. Ziyoda has also acted in a number of Uzbek drama films.

== Life ==
Ziyoda O’tkirovna Qobilova was born on January 7, 1989, in Tashkent. While her official birth year is 1989, other sources claim it is 1987. She has a brother named Asadbek and a sister named Aziza.

Later on, she married a man named Eldor, and had a son by the name of Komron by him.

== Career ==
=== Music career ===
Ziyoda rose to stardom in Uzbekistan for the first time with the song "Sevmaganman", a cover of Ruslana's Wild Dances, in 2004. Her debut album was released in Uzbekistan in 2008. Her music has been described as "a flawless and modern mix between Central-Asia, Arabia and the Western world." In 2007, Ziyoda was voted the best female singer of the year in Uzbekistan.

=== Music videos ===
Year	Title	Director
	"Ichim yonar"	
	"Begonaman"	
	"Dugonalar"	
	"Bahor"	
	"Tinch qoʻygin meni"	
	"Darding"	
	"Dekaram tu"	
	"Khatouba"	
	"Ota"	
	"Pepsi (gimn)" (feat. Ulugʻbek Rahmatullaev and Munisa Rizaeva)	
	"Dukur—dukur"	
2006	"Hay layli"	
2006	"Hayotim bu" (Uzbek version of Armenian Eurovision song 2006)	Yodgor Nosirov
2006	"Sevmaganman"	Yodgor Nosirov
2007	"Goʻzalim (Seni men sogʻinganda)" (feat. Nigora and Bojalar)	
2007	"Parvona"	
2008	"Yuragimsan"	
2008	"Zardalaringni"	
2008	"Zormande" (feat. Jahongir Foziljonov)	
2008	"Sabbai sayyod (Sayding qoʻyaber sayyod)"	Sardor Rasulov
2008	"Ey muhabbat"	Sardor Rasulov
2008	"Talpinadi yuragim" (feat. Jahongir Foziljonov)	soundtrack "Nortoy"
2008	"Xayolimni olma" (feat. Ulugʻbek Rahmatullaev)	Rustam Murodov
2008	"Super kelinchak"	soundtrack "Super kelinchak"
2008	"Yoʻllarim"	
2008	"Har soniya"	
2009	"Negadir"	soundtrack "Ichkuyov"
2010	"Sevib qol"	
2010	"Oʻynaganda janon"	
2010	"Soʻrab koʻr" (feat. Davron Ergashev)	
2010	"Kichkina xoʻjayin" (feat. Alisher Uzoqov)	soundtrack "Kichkina xoʻjayin"
2010	"Erka oshiqlar" (feat. Otabek Mutalxoʻjaev)	
2010	"Dunyo" (feat. Sirojiddin Xojiev)	soundtrack "Firibgar"
2010	"Baxt toʻla"	
2010	"Shaddod qiz"	soundtrack "Shaddod qiz"
2010	"Khatouba, I Am A Disco Dancer" (feat. Aziz Rametov and Otabek Mutalxoʻjaev)	Alibaba Aur 40 Chor, Disco Dancer (soundtrack "Ada emas dada! Tohir va Zuhra 2 yangi talqinda")
2011	"Oʻrgilay oʻzim" (feat. Mirjamol)	Narimon Sultonxoʻjaev soundtrack "Mening akam boydoq"
2011	"Vatan"	Sarvar Karimov, Izatulla Lutfullaev
2011	"Sevaman"	
2011	"Onajonim"	
2011	"Sevmasam boʻlmaydida"	
2011	"Kun tong"	
2011	"Nega-nega"	
2011	"Seni sevaman" (feat. Ruhshona and Marka)	soundtrack "Uchrashuv"
2011	"Orzularim"	
2011	"Andijonlik mehmon" (feat. Ruhshona and Umidaxon and Jahongir Foziljonov)	soundtrack "Andijonlik mehmon"
2011	"Qora koʻzlar"	
2011	"Sodda qiz"	
2012	"Mazim"	
2012	"Bolalar uyining bolasi"	
2012	"Gul edim"	soundtrack "Tubanlik"
2012	"Oqibat"	soundtrack "Oqibat"
2012	"Qaynona"	soundtrack "Super qaynona"
2012	"Hali-hali"	
2013	"Sevadi yorim mani"	Sarvar Karimov
2013	"Oʻzingda-oʻzingda"	Rustam Murodov
2013	"Olaver" (feat. Jahongir Foziljonov)	
2014	"Assalomu aleykum"	Narimon Sultonxoʻjaev
2014	"Xayolim"	Yodgor Nosirov
2014	"Asalim"	Sarvar Karimov
2014	"Kim bilar"	soundtrack "Erkatoy"
2015	"Yaxshi qol"	Sarvar Karimov
2015	"Ana hey"	soundtrack "Onasini bolasi"
2015	"Oʻyna-oʻyna"	
2016	"Ikkimiz"	
2016	"Jononim mani"	Sarvar Karimov
2016	"Jim"	Jonrid Sagdiyev

== Filmography ==
=== Actress ===
Film
Year	Film	Translation	Role	Notes
2006	Asal qopqog'i			Supporting role
2007	Boyvachcha	Rich Guy		Supporting role
2008	Nortoy	Nortoy		Leading role
2008	Madagaskar 2	Madagascar: Escape 2 Africa	Dubbing voice	Voice role
2009	Achchiq hayot	Bitter Life		Leading role
2009	Qalbaki dunyo	A Fake World	Herself	Special guest appearance
2010	Ada emas, dada! Tohir va Zuhra 2 yangi talqin	Tohir and Zuhra 2. New Interpretation	Herself	Supporting role
2010	Bekorchilar makoni	The Land of Lazybones	Feruza	Leading role
2010	Kichkina xo'jayin	The Small Boss	Herself	Special guest appearance
2011	Enagalar	Babysitters		Leading role
2011	Uchrashuv	Meeting	Ziyoda	Leading role
2013	Ijarachilar		Shahnoza	Leading role

Music videos
Year	Song title	Artist
2008	"Qora choy"	Bojalar
2010	"Oʻzbegim"	Jahongir Foziljonov
2011	"Sen meni sevasanmi?"	Oybek & Nigora

== See also ==
- Zulayho Boyhonova
- Nasiba Abdullaeva
- Madina Mumtoz
