= Dilbar Abdulazizova =

Uzbek actress (1951–2019)

- Born: Dilbar Sabitovna Abdulazizova; September 12, 1951; Qibray District, Uzbek SSR, USSR
- Died: March 15, 2019 (aged 67)
- Occupations: theater actress, film actress
- Years active: 1972-2019
- Awards: Honored artist of Uzbekistan; People's Artist of Uzbekistan

Dilbar Abdulazizova (September 12, 1951, Dorman, Tashkent Region, Uzbek SSR - March 15, 2019) was an Uzbek theater and film actress who received the People's Artist of Uzbekistan award in 2013.

== Biography ==
Abdulazizova graduated from the Tashkent State Theater and Art Institute (later called the Uzbekistan State Institute of Arts and Culture) in 1972. That same year she began working at the Samarkand Regional Musical Drama Theater named after Hamid Olimjon. In 1973 she became an actress at the Republic of Uzbekistan's Youth Theater.

In 2000 Abdulazizova became an Honored Artist of Uzbekistan, and in 2013 a People's Artist of Uzbekistan.

Abdulazizova died on March 15, 2019, after a prolonged illness.

== Theater works ==
Her main roles were in the following productions:

- "Qor malikasi"
- "Qoʻngʻiroqli ayyor"
- "Mening otam qahramon"
- "Otlar yigʻlaganda"
- "Qizil qalpoqcha"

== Film work ==
She was in the following films:

- "Bahor qaytmaydi" — played the role of Lobar (1970).
- "Sarvinoz" — played the role of Ilhom's mother in his youth (2004).
- "Sehrgar" — played the role of an aunt(2011).

== See also ==
- Munavvara Abdullayeva
- Tamara Shakirova
- Zaynab Sadriyeva
