= Lutfulla Sadullayev =

Soviet and Uzbek actor and director (1940–2022)

Lutfulla Sadullayev (Uzbek: Lutfulla Saʼdullayev; 1940–2022) was a Soviet and Uzbek actor and director who was named the People's Artist of Uzbekistan (2001).

== Early life and education ==
Sadullayev was born on 18 December 1940 in Tashkent. In 1965, he graduated from the Uzbekistan State Institute of Arts and Culture.

== Career ==
In 1963, Sadullayevhe began acting in films. Between then and 2007, he worked as an actor at the Abdulla Qahhor Theatre of Satire. He played leading roles in the films Ҳayot tunda ўtib ketdi (1968), Caravan (1973), and House under the Hot Sun (1977). In 2008, he started working at the Republican Theatre of Young Spectators of Uzbekistan.

During his career, he played roles in about 200 plays, and has also appeared in more than 500 films, videos and television miniatures.

== Honours and awards ==
- People's Artist of Uzbekistan (2001)

== Personal life ==
In 1968, Sadullayevhe married his colleague, Honoured Artist of Uzbekistan Gulchehra Sadullaeva. They have two daughters, both of whom are actresses: Gulirano Sadullaeva and Muqaddas Sadullayeva. He is also father-in-law to Honoured Artist of Uzbekistan Fathulla Masudov and film actor Yigitali Mamadjanov.
