= Ismoil (name) =

Ismoil is both a given name and a surname. Notable people with the name include:

- Ismoil Jalilov (born 1948), Uzbek-Soviet opera singer
- Ismoil Mahmadzoir (born 1995), Tajik sports administrator
- Ismoil Talbakov (1955–2016), Tajik politician
- Eyad Ismoil (born 1971), Jordanian terrorist
