= Fotima Borukhova =

Uzbek Soviet opera singer

- Born: 9 November 1916
- Died: August 2009 (aged 92)
- Known for: opera singer, katta ashula
- Awards: Honored Artist of Uzbekistan (1942), People’s Artist of the USSR (1950), 2 Orders of the Red Banner

Fotima Borukhova, also Fatima Borukhova (Uzbek: Фотима Борухова, romanized: Fotima Boruxova; 9 November 1916 – August 2009) was an Uzbek Soviet opera singer (mezzo-soprano), Honored Artist of Uzbekistan (1942), People's Artist of the USSR (1950). She is best known for singing a part of Zebuniso in the first Uzbek opera "Buran" (The Storm) by Mukhtar Ashrafi and Sergei Vasilenko, as well as for singing katta ashula songs.

== Early life ==
Fotima Borukhova was born on 9 November 1916. She grew up in a large Jewish family of Dzhura and Mazol Borukhov. At the age of 12 Borukhova first appeared on the stage of her native Andijan. In 1930, she began her scenic activity in the Andijan and Drama Music Theater, and from 1935, she was a soloist of the Tashkent Opera and Ballet Theater named after Alisher Navoi.

== Career ==
In 1937, Borukhova participated in the first Decade of the Arts of Uzbekistan in Moscow.

In 1939, she sang the part of Zebuniso on the premiere of the first Uzbek opera “"Buran" by M. Ashrafi and S. Vasilenko. Borukhova's singing full of sorrow perfectly underlined the director's intention.

Borukhova's other parts include: Parts: Leili ("Leili and Majnun" by Reinhold Glière and Tolibjon Sadikov), Akzhunus ("Yor-Targyn" by Yevgeny Brusilovsky), Shirin ("Farhad and Shirin" by Viktor Uspensky and Georgy Mushel), Polina, Nyanya ("The Queen of Spades", "Eugene Onegin"), Fortune Teller ("Almast" by Alexander Spendiaryan) and others.

She was also one of few female singers who sang katta ashula songs. Katta ashula genre takes origins in ancient folk-ritual chants and songs of “praise”.

In 1940–1942, Borukhova studied in Uzbek opera studio at Moscow conservatory. In 1941, when German forces approached Moscow, Borukhova was a part of the front-line concert brigade: she spoke in front of the soldiers leaving for battle and in front of the wounded in hospitals near Moscow.

In 1979, Borukhova ended her creative career at the Opera and Ballet Theater, however she remained active and participated in the evening of friendship organized by Bukhara-Jewish community as a guest of honor.

Fotima Borukhova died in August 2009 at the age of 93.

== Awards ==
Fotima Borukhova was awarded two Orders of the Red Banner, a title of an Honored Artist of Uzbekistan (1942) and a People's Artist (1950).

== See also ==
- Ismoil Jalilov
- Jenisbek Piyazov
