= Zulayho Boyhonova =

Uzbek singer

- Born: April 28, 1963 (age 63); Namangan, Andijan Region, Uzbek SSR, USSR
- Occupations: singer, actress
- Years active: 1990–present
- Awards: Oʻzbekiston xalq artisti(People's Artist of Uzbekistan); Oʻzbekistonda xizmat koʻrsatgan artist(Honored artist of Uzbekistan)

Zulayho Boyhonova (born April 28, 1963, Namangan, Namangan Region, Uzbek SSR, USSR) is an Uzbek singer, performing songs in the Uzbek language, and was named People's Artist of Uzbekistan (2003).

== Biography ==
Zulayho Boyhonova was born on April 28, 1963, in the Namangan Region of Uzbekistan. In 1980, she completed secondary school and, in 1981 enrolled at the Uzbekistan State Institute of Arts and Culture in the Department of Musical Drama.

After graduating from the institute in 1986, she started working at the Uzbek State Musical Drama Theater named after Muqumiy. In the theater, she played several leading roles in performances. For her significant contributions to theatrical arts and creative achievements, she was awarded the title of "Honored artist of Uzbekistan" in 1996 and in 2003 was honored with the title of "People's Artist of Uzbekistan".

In 2005, Zulayho Boyhonova was awarded by the Ministry of Culture and Sports of the Republic of Uzbekistan with the nomination "Sahnamiz farishtasi" ("Angel of the Stage"). The singer has been on tour in several countries: the United States, France, Belgium, Poland, Germany, Pakistan, India, China, Turkey, Russia, South Korea, Egypt, Saudi Arabia. Currently, she works as a singer in the national ensemble "Ofarin," led by her teacher, the "People's Artist of Uzbekistan", Abduhashim Ismailov.

== Awards ==
- Oʻzbekiston xalq artisti(People's Artist of Uzbekistan)(1996)
- Oʻzbekistonda xizmat koʻrsatgan artist(Honored artist of Uzbekistan)(2003)

== Family ==
- Husband – Shukhrat
- Daughter – Madina
- Son – Firdavs

== Filmography ==
- Шайтанат (series)

== Roles on stage ==
- "Mashrab"
- "Alpomishning qaytishi"
- "Quduq tubidagi faryod"
- "Nodirabegim"
- "Fotima va Zuhra"
- "Taqdir"
- "Aka-uka sovchilar"
