= Jalilov =

Jalilov is a surname. Notable people with the surname include:

- Ismoil Jalilov (born 1948), Uzbek-Soviet opera singer
- Jeyhun Jalilov (born 1987), Azerbaijani economist
- Jakhongir Jalilov (born 1989), Tajikistani footballer
- Kamil Jalilov (1938–2022), Azerbaijani musician
- Romish Jalilov (born 1995), Tajik footballer
- Toʻxtasin Jalilov (c. 1895–1966), Uzbek composer
- Tural Jalilov (born 1986), Azerbaijani footballer
