= Abduhashim Ismailov =

Kurdish musician

- Абдухошим Исмоилов
- Born: June 9, 1952 (age 74); Chaman, Kuva District, Fergana Region, Uzbek SSR, USSR
- Awards: Oʻzbekistonda xizmat koʻrsatgan artist(Honored artist of Uzbekistan); Oʻzbekiston xalq artisti(People's Artist of Uzbekistan)

Abduhashim Ismailov (Абдухошим Исмоилов; born June 9, 1952, Chaman, Kuva District, Fergana Region, Uzbek SSR, USSR) is a Uzbek musician from Uzbekistan. His music is included in the Smithsonian Institution's Uzbekistan: Echoes of Vanished Courts as part of their Smithsonian Folkways collection. Educated at the Fergana College of Music and the Tashkent State Conservatory, he is a composer and plays the ghidjak, rubāb, and violin. In 1980 he was named an Honoured Artist of Uzbekistan. He has released six albums on the Melodiya record label and won the Golden Gramophone Award in 1987. In 1990 he was named a People's Artist of Uzbekistan. His repertoire is broad ranging from his own original compositions to traditional Uzbekistan music to Indian classical music and Western classical music. He is particularly celebrated for composing music for the ghidjak, and for performances on that instrument in many styles and genres.
