= Munavvara Abdullayeva =

Uzbekistani actress

- Born: April 5, 1950 (age 75); Margilan, Uzbek SSR, USSR
- Occupations: actress, director, teacher
- Awards: "Oʻzbekiston Respublikasida xizmat koʻrsatgan yoshlar ustozi unvoni"(The title of "Honored youth teacher in the Republic of Uzbekistan"); "Mehnat shuhrati ordeni"("Order of Labor Glory")

Munavvara Abdullayeva (born April 5, 1950, in Margilan) is an Uzbek actress, director, teacher, and a master of national theater art.

== Biography ==
Munavvara Abdullayeva was born on April 5, 1950, into a working family. She completed secondary school in 1966 and in 1971 graduated from the Margilan Vocational Economic College. As a prospective actress, in 1975 she graduated from the faculty of "Theater and Film Actors" at the Tashkent Theater and Art Institute named after A.N. Ostrovsky (now: Uzbekistan State Institute of Arts and Culture).

Abdullayeva worked as an actress at the Sirdaryo Regional Musical Theater from 1975 to 1976. From 1976 to 1978, she was a postgraduate student at the Moscow State Institute of Theater Arts named after Lunacharsky(now: Russian Institute of Theatre Arts), and from 1978, she became first a teacher, later an associate professor at the Tashkent State Art Institute named after M. Uygur(now: Uzbekistan State Institute of Arts and Culture). In 1985, she became an actress at the Uzbek Youth Theater "Yosh Gvardiyasi".

In 2000, Munavvara Abdullayeva was awarded the title of "Young Teacher of the Republic of Uzbekistan".

In 2023, she was honored with the "Order of Labor Glory". During her student years, Abdullayeva studied together with current artists in the Republic of Uzbekistan such as Mirzabek Kholmedov, Madina Mukhtarova, Abduraim Abduvahobov, Behzod Mukhammadkarimov, and others.

== Works ==
In addition to teaching students, M. Abdullayeva also works as a professional director. He staged about 30 plays in various theaters of the Republic of Uzbekistan. The plays he staged individually were awarded with awards and prizes from Uzbekistan and foreign countries:

- "Chegaradagi uy" (Fergana Russian Theater, 1995) - award for original direction.
- "Chimildik" (National Theater of the Republic, 1997) - Order of Friendship of Peoples, winner of the World Theater Festival held in Egypt.

Some performances are included in the fund of theater art of the Republic of Uzbekistan:

- Uyg‘un's performance "Alisher Navoiy"
- Qodiriy's performance "Mehrobdan chayon".
- Xushvaktov's performance "Chimildik"
- Xushvaktov's performance "Mashrab"

=== Acting career ===
She also played many roles in movies:

- In 1972– "Hayqirgan togʻlar" - Maluka
- In 1986– "Zumrasha" - cleaning woman
- In 1986– "Oq bino oqshomlari" - mother
- In 1987– "Qaldirgʻoch" - women
- In 1996– "Domla" – Hadichaxon
- In 1998– "Kichkina tabib" - Xayriniso
- In 1999– "Oppoq qushlar" - mother
- In 2000– "Meros dalalar" - judge
- In 2000– "Fazli" - suitor
- In 2001– "Ayol" - Chinnigul
- In 2002– "Kalish" - women
- In 2002– "Nomaʼlum qahramon" - mother
- In 2004– "Osmondagi bolalar"
- In 2006– "Narigi olam" - Elyor's mother is Rozia
- In 2006– "Osmon yaqin" - Kadir's mother
- In 2008– "Oʻyin" - Jamshid's mother
- In 2009– "Yoʻqolgan odam" - Salahiddin's mother
- In 2010– "24 soat" - Sanjar's mother
- In 2011– "Aldangan ayol"
- In 2012— "Qovun"
- In 2012– "Tubanlik" - doctor
- In 2015— "Koʻz yoshim"
- In 2018— "Issiq non"

== See also ==
- Dilbar Abdulazizova
- Tamara Shakirova
- Zaynab Sadriyeva
