= Nasiba Abdullaeva =

Soviet singer (born 1961)

- Uzbek: Nasiba Abdullayeva
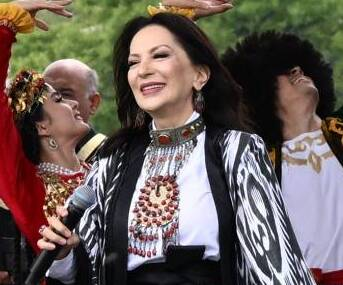
- Born: Abdullayeva Nasiba Melikovna; November 15, 1961; Samarkand, Uzbek SSR
- Citizenship: Soviet Union, Uzbekistan
- Education: Uzbekistan State Institute of Arts and Culture
- Occupation: Singer
- Years active: 1980–present
- Known for: "Bari gal"
- Style: Pop music Folk
- Spouse: Eldar Abdullaev (m. 1979)
- Children: Anvar Abdullaev (b. 1981); Akbar Abdullaev (b. 1987)
- Awards: Order "Mehnat Shuhrati"; Order "Fidokorona xizmatlari uchun"; People's Artist of Uzbekistan

Nasiba Abdullaeva (Uzbek: Nasiba Abdullayeva) is a Soviet and Uzbek pop singer, People's Artist of Uzbekistan (1993), People's artist of Azerbaijani (2022). She has performed songs in Uzbek, Persian, Azerbaijani, Arabic, Tajik, Russian and other languages.

== Biography ==
Nasiba Abdullaeva was born on November 15, 1961, in Samarkand in a family of workers, father Melik Yarmukhamedov and mother Khalchuchuk Halimakulova, was the youngest seventh child. As a child, she studied at a music school, accordion class. After an unsuccessful attempt to enter the Institute of Architecture and Civil Engineering, she worked as a music teacher at school.

In 1980, Nasiba was invited as a soloist to the newly organized vocal-instrumental ensemble "Samarkand". In the same year, two albums were released with songs performed by her – "Bari Gal" and "Samarkand". Upon graduation in 1989 from the Uzbekistan State Institute of Arts and Culture she began to work at the Uzbek State Philharmonic.

In 1990 she released her first solo album "Ayriliq (Separation)". After a divorce from her husband in 2000, she left the stage for two years.

In 2002 she returned to the stage. Since 2004 she has been teaching a course at the State Conservatory at the Department of Variety Performing Arts.

In 2018, a fragment from the song "Farida", was used in a commercial for the Fendi fashion house.

On August 30, 2022, Nasiba Abdullayeva was awarded the honorary title of People's Artiste of Azerbaijan by the decree of the President of Azerbaijan.

== Awards ==
- Honored Artist of the Uzbek SSR (1987)
- People's Artist of Uzbekistan (1993)
- Order "Mehnat Shuhrati" (1999)
- Order "Fidokorona xizmatlari uchun" (2018)
- People's Artiste of Azerbaijan (2022)

== Discography ==
- 1980 — "Bari gal"
- 1980 — "Samarkand"
- 1990 — "Ayriliq"
- 2000 — "Sog'inch"
- 2002 — "Umr bahori"
- 2006 — "Eslanar"
- 2014 — "Baxt oʻzi nimadur?"

== See also ==
- Madina Mumtoz
- Zulayho Boyhonova
