= Andijan =

Andijan Andijon / Андижон Андижан
- City
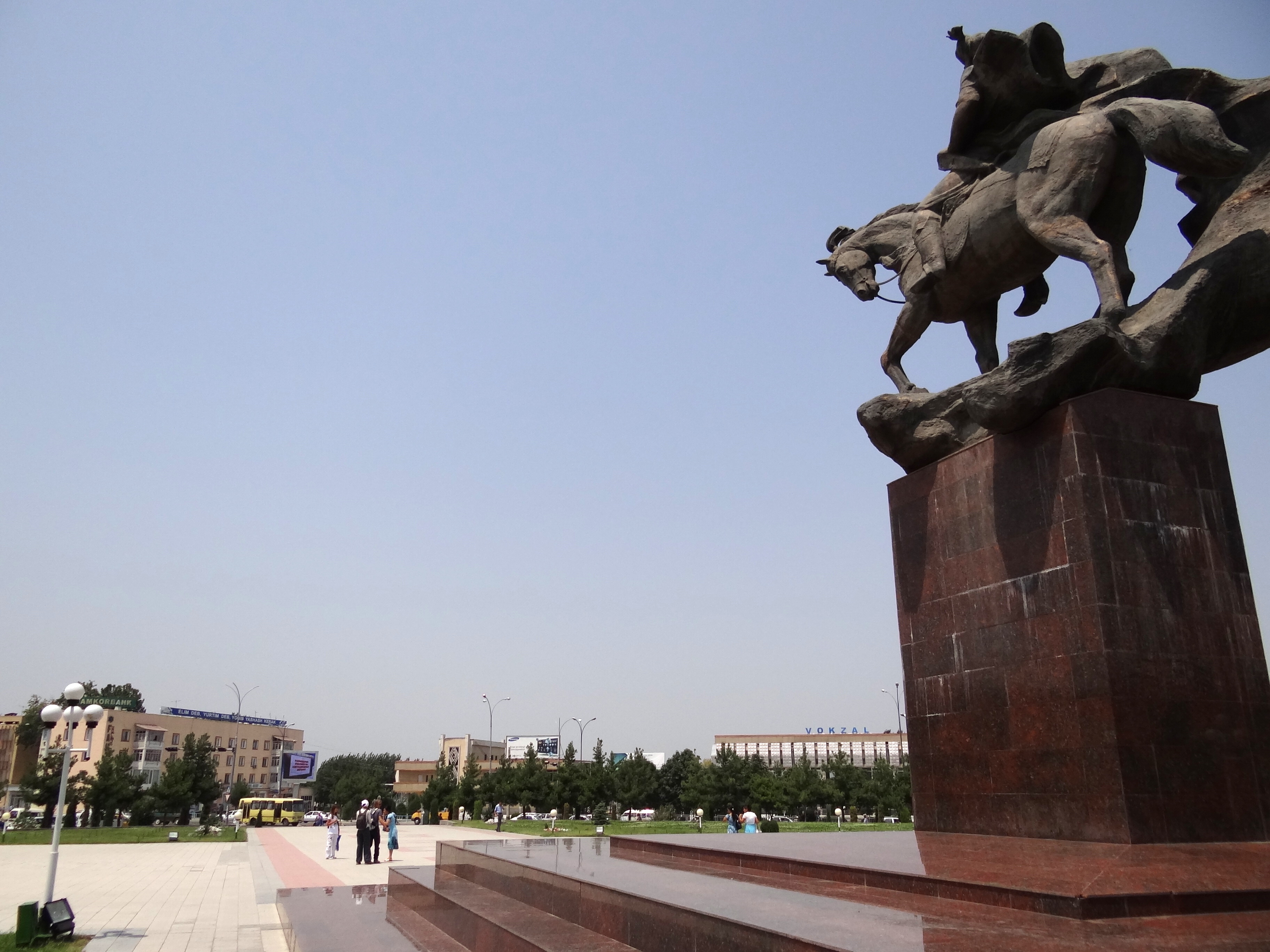
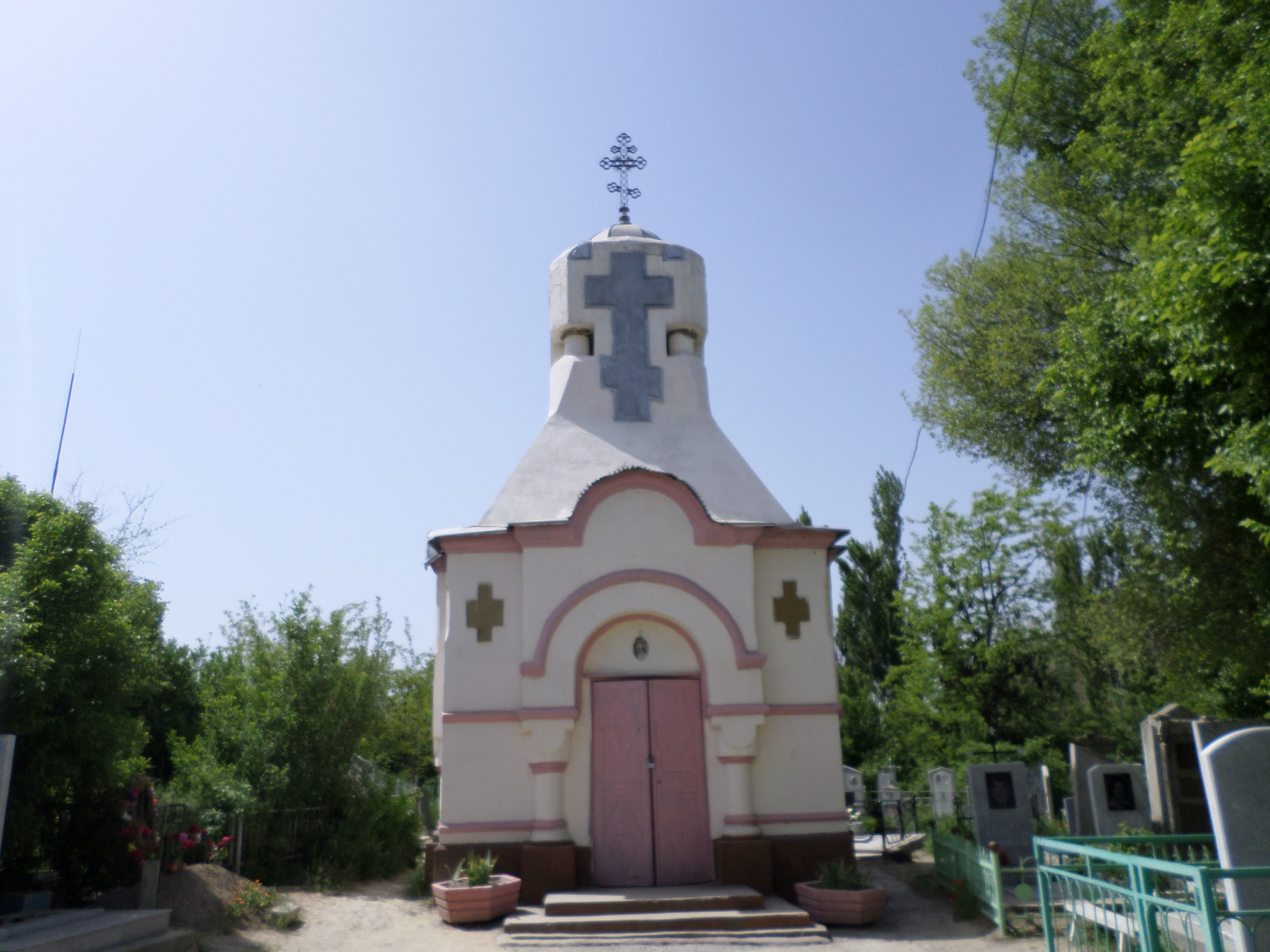
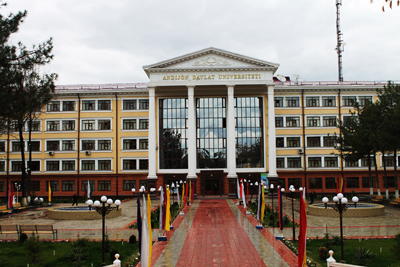
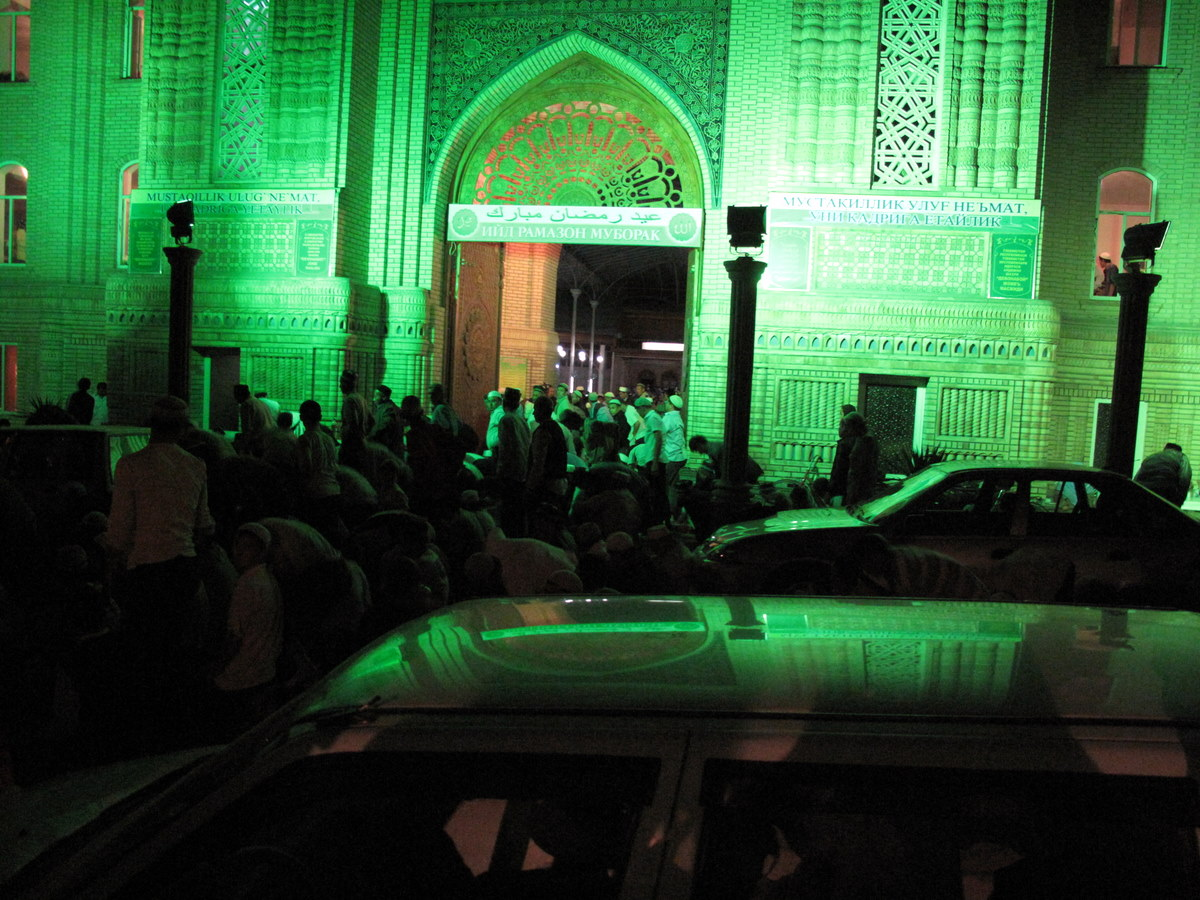
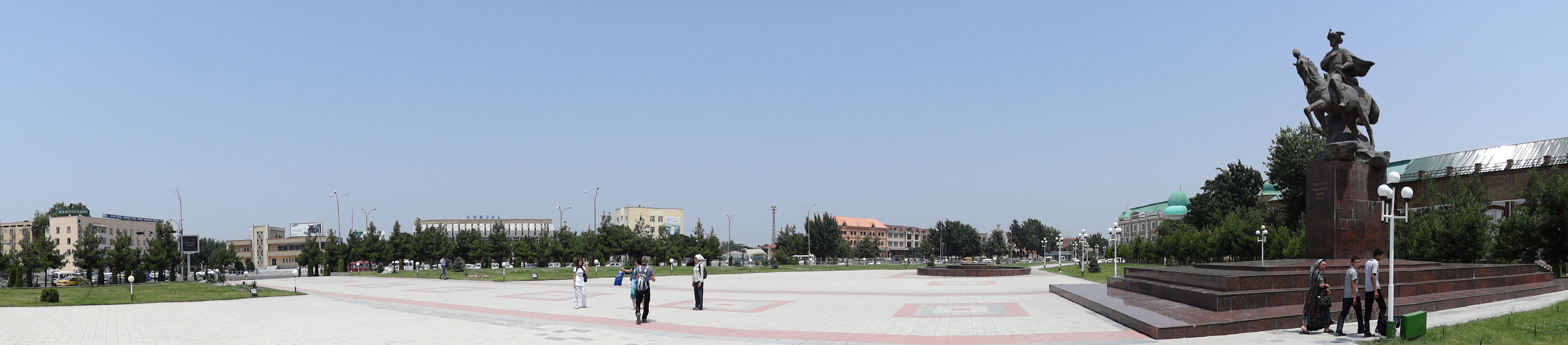
- Above: Devonaboy Jome Mosque, Second: Statue of Z.M. Babur, Andhjan Chapel of Saint George, Third: Andijan State University, Zubayr Ibn Avvom Jame Mosque, Bottom: Panoramic view of Navoi Square (all relative items are left to right)

- Location in Uzbekistan
- Coordinates: 40°47′0″N 72°20′2″E
- Country: Uzbekistan
- Region: Andijan Region
- First mention: V-IV BC

Government
  - Hokim: Shukhratbek Abdurakhmonov Kushakbaevich

Area
  - Total: 74.3 km^{2} (28.7 sq mi)
- Elevation: 500 m (1,600 ft)

Population (2024)
  - Total: 501,131
  - Density: 6,740/km^{2} (17,500/sq mi)
- Time zone: UTC+5 (UZT)
  - Summer (DST): UTC+5 (not observed)
- Postal code: 170100
- Area code: +998 74
- Website: www.andijan.uz

Andijan (/ˌændɪˈdʒæn, -ˈdʒɑːn/ AN-dih-JAN, -JAHN), also spelt Andijon (Uzbek: [ˌændɪˈdʒɒn]) and formerly romanized as Andizhan (Russian: Андижан [əndʲɪˈʐan]), is a city in Uzbekistan. It is the administrative, economic, and cultural center of Andijan Region. Andijan is a district-level city with an area of 74 km^{2} (29 sq mi). Andijan is the most densely populated city with density of 10,000 people/km^{2} and it had 747,800 inhabitants in 2024. Andijan is located in a tense border region at the south-eastern edge of the Fergana Valley near Uzbekistan's border with Kyrgyzstan.

At more than 2,500 years in age, Andijan is the oldest city in Uzbekistan and one of the oldest cities in the Fergana Valley. In some parts of the city, archeologists have found items dating back to the 7th and 8th centuries B.C.E. Historically, Andijan was an important city on the Silk Road.

The city is perhaps best known as the birthplace of Babur who, following a series of setbacks, finally succeeded in laying the basis for the Mughal dynasty in the Indian subcontinent and became the first Mughal emperor. Andijan also gained notoriety in 2005 when government forces opened fire on protestors, killing hundreds in what came to be known as the Andijan Massacre.

Andijan was developed into an important industrial city during the Soviet era. Manufactured goods produced in the city include chemicals, domestic appliances, electronics, foodstuffs, furniture, plows, pumps, shoes, spare parts for farming machines, various engineering tools, and wheelchairs.

Andijan experiences frequent seismic activity and was destroyed by a large earthquake in 1902. This was the worst earthquake to occur in Uzbekistan in the 20th century.

== History ==
=== Toponymy ===
The origin of the name of the city is uncertain. Arab geographers of the 10th century referred to Andijan as "Andukan," "Andugan," "Andegan" or "Andigan." The traditional explanation links the name of the city to the Turkic tribal names Andi and Adoq/Azoq.

=== Early history ===
Andijan is one of the oldest cities in the Fergana Valley. In some parts of the city, archeologists have found items dating back to the 7th and 8th centuries. Historically, Andijan was an important city on the Silk Road.

The city is perhaps best known as the birthplace of Babur who, following a series of setbacks, finally succeeded in laying the basis for the Mughal dynasty in the Indian subcontinent and became the first Mughal emperor.

After the formation of the Khanate of Kokand in the 18th century, the capital was moved from Andijan to Kokand. In the mid-19th century, the Russian Empire began occupying the area of present-day Central Asia. In 1876, the Russians conquered the Khanate of Kokand and the city of Andijan along with it.

Andijan was the center and flashpoint of the Andijan Uprising of 1898 in which the followers of Sufi leader Madali Ishan attacked the Russian barracks in the city, killing 22 and injuring 16-20 more. In retaliation, 18 of the participants were hanged and 360 exiled.

=== 20th century ===
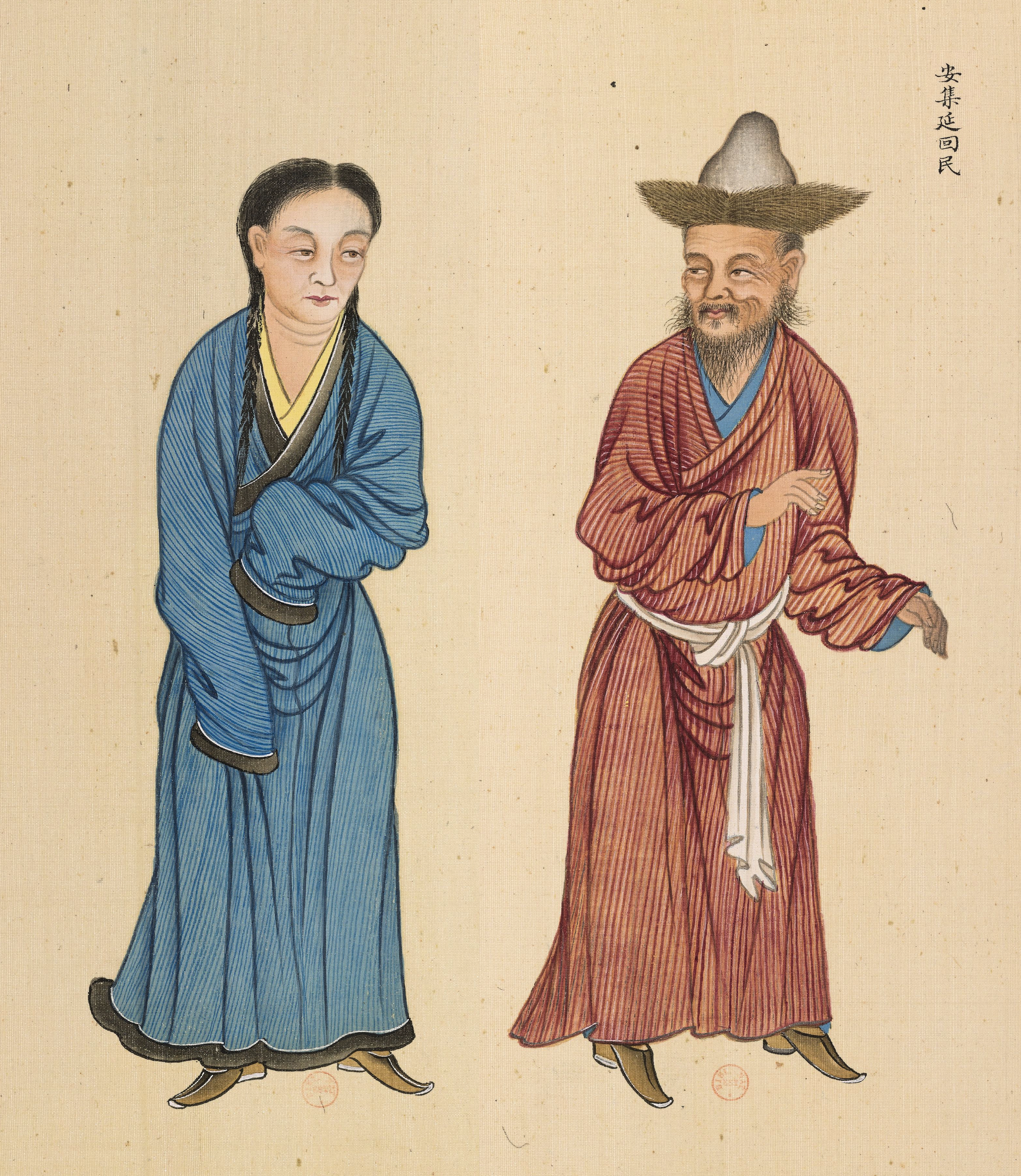
Muslim commoners from Andijan (安集延). Huang Qing Zhigong Tu, 1769

==== 1902 earthquake ====
On 16 December 1902, much of the city was leveled by a severe earthquake which destroyed up to 30,000 homes in the region and killed as many as 4,500 residents. After Soviet rule was established in Andijan in 1917, the city quickly became an important industrial city in the Uzbek SSR.

==== Soviet era ====
During the Soviet demarcation of Central Asia, Andijan was separated from its historical hinterland as the Ferghana Valley was divided among three separate Soviet republics. Andijan itself became part of the Uzbek SSR.

During World War II, many Soviet citizens were evacuated to Andijan and the surrounding towns. Of the Jewish refugees fleeing Nazi-occupied Poland and banished by the Soviets to Siberia and Central Asia, some relocated to Andijan starting in 1941.

==== Post-Soviet Islamic fundamentalism ====
In the 1990s, Andijan and the surrounding region became politically unstable. Poverty and an upsurge in Islamic fundamentalism produced tensions in the region. The town, and the region as a whole, suffered a severe economic decline following the fall of the Soviet Union in 1991. Repeated border closures badly damaged the local economy, worsening the already widespread poverty of Andijan's inhabitants.

===== May 2005 massacre =====
On 13 May 2005, Uzbekistan's military opened fire on a mass of people who were protesting against poor living conditions and corrupt government. The estimates of those killed on 13 May range from 187, the official count of the government, to several hundred. A defector from the SNB alleged that 1,500 were killed. The bodies of many of those who died were allegedly hidden in mass graves following the massacre.

The Uzbek government at first stated that the Islamic Movement of Uzbekistan organized the unrest and that the protesters were members of Hizb ut-Tahrir. Critics have argued that the radical Islamist label has been just a pretext for maintaining a repressive regime in the country.

Whether troops fired indiscriminately to prevent a colour revolution or acted legitimately to quell a prison break is also disputed. Another theory is that the dispute was really an inter-clan struggle for state power. The Uzbek government eventually acknowledged that poor economic conditions in the region and popular resentment played a role in the uprising.

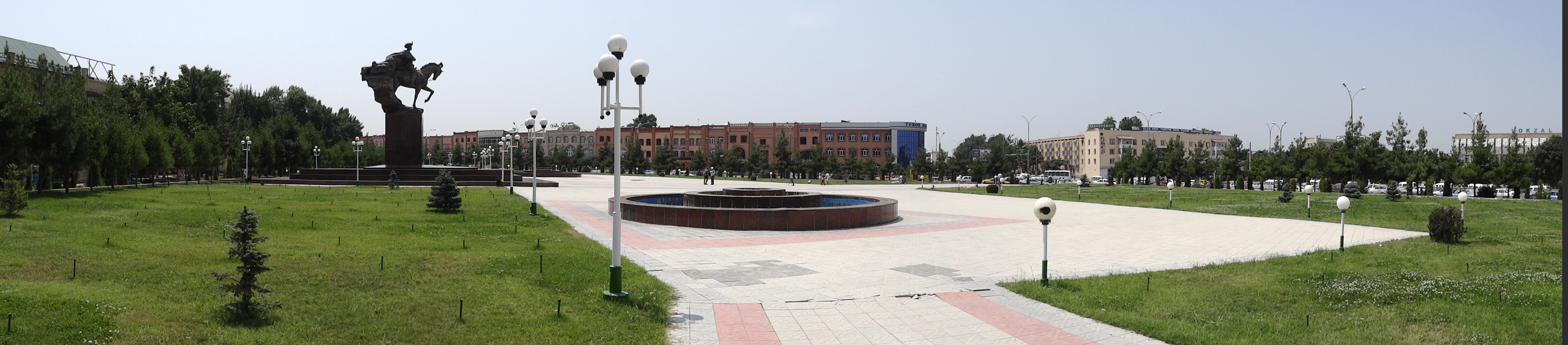
Panorama of Navoi Square where the 2005 massacre took place

== Geography ==
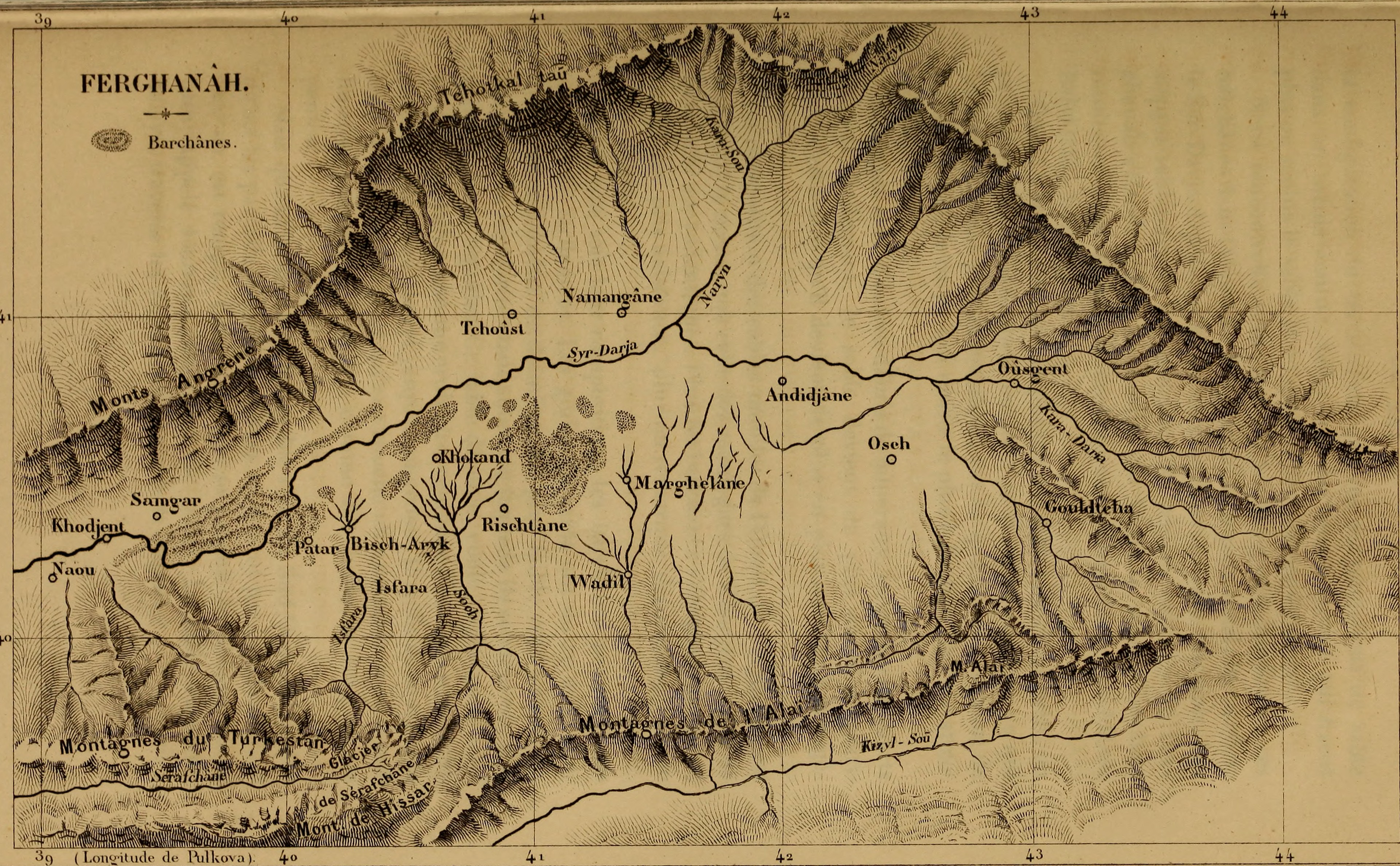
Detailed French map of 1882, showing position of Andijan (here spelled "Andidjâne", slightly right of centre) in the Fergana valley

Andijan is located 450 metres (1,480 ft) above sea level on the southeastern edge of the Fergana Valley, near Uzbekistan's border with Kyrgyzstan. By road it is 22 kilometres (14 mi) northeast of Asaka and 68.6 kilometres (42.6 mi) southeast of Namangan.

=== Climate ===
Andijan has a cold semi-arid climate (Köppen climate classification BSk) with cold winters and hot summers, with a very continental climate, although winters are milder than one might expect for a location in Central Asia. Rainfall is generally light and erratic, and summers are particularly dry.

Climate data for Andijan (1991–2020)
Month	Jan	Feb	Mar	Apr	May	Jun	Jul	Aug	Sep	Oct	Nov	Dec	Year
Mean daily maximum °C (°F)	4.2 (39.6)	7.9 (46.2)	15.8 (60.4)	23.0 (73.4)	28.4 (83.1)	33.4 (92.1)	35.0 (95.0)	33.4 (92.1)	28.9 (84.0)	21.5 (70.7)	12.8 (55.0)	5.6 (42.1)	20.8 (69.4)
Daily mean °C (°F)	−0.1 (31.8)	2.8 (37.0)	9.8 (49.6)	16.4 (61.5)	21.6 (70.9)	26.2 (79.2)	27.9 (82.2)	26.0 (78.8)	21.0 (69.8)	13.9 (57.0)	6.8 (44.2)	1.3 (34.3)	14.5 (58.1)
Mean daily minimum °C (°F)	−3.3 (26.1)	−1.2 (29.8)	4.8 (40.6)	10.6 (51.1)	15.1 (59.2)	19.0 (66.2)	20.6 (69.1)	18.9 (66.0)	14.0 (57.2)	7.9 (46.2)	2.3 (36.1)	−1.8 (28.8)	8.9 (48.0)
Average precipitation mm (inches)	21.7 (0.85)	31.9 (1.26)	32.9 (1.30)	26.8 (1.06)	25.0 (0.98)	12.8 (0.50)	4.8 (0.19)	4.1 (0.16)	3.4 (0.13)	17.5 (0.69)	30.3 (1.19)	32.6 (1.28)	243.8 (9.60)
Average precipitation days (≥ 1.0 mm)	8	10	10	9	10	8	5	3	3	6	7	9	88
Average relative humidity (%)	84	81	72	62	54	46	50	57	60	68	77	86	66
Mean monthly sunshine hours	62.1	95.1	153.2	217.1	291.2	331.0	357.7	339.0	282.9	210.8	116.4	64.4	2,520.9
Source: NOAA (humidity 1961-1990)

Fertile soils, abundance of heat and light, long frost-free period (about 210 days a year) favor the cultivation of heat-loving crops - cotton, mulberry, citrus and other subtropical crops in the vicinity of the city.

Andijan is surrounded by the foothills of the Pamir and Tian Shan mountains, which in summer are covered with snowy peaks, and in the lower reaches are enveloped by forest groves of walnut and coniferous forests.

Winters are usually mild and short. Winds are weaker than in the western parts of the valley, averaging 5 m/s, and average annual precipitation is 232 mm per year. Summers are comparatively less hot than in Central Asia.

=== Canals and rivers ===
Main water arteries of Andijan city:

- "Andijonsoy" canal, which crosses Andijan from south-east to north-west (urban length of the canal is 20 km with stream bed width from 5 to 10 meters);
- 2 rowing canals in the north-west suburb of Andijan (according to the new site plan they are not included in the city limits) are parallel and have a length of about 2.8 km with a width of 35-45 meters;
- The Kara Darya River flows from the north-east to the north-west of Andijan and its suburbs 3-5 km from the city limits.

Despite the fact that in some places the urban neighborhoods of Andijan's suburbs and the buildings of the Tashkent State Agrarian University are adjacent to the river, the waterfront was not included in the new general plan of Andijan (adopted and approved in 2017) and in the city limits.

=== Vegetation ===
The vegetation of Andijan is diverse and rich. The city itself is decorated with exotic, ornamental, subtropical, fruit, citrus, nut, coniferous and deciduous crops of trees and shrubs. Floriculture and horticulture are widely developed.

In the years of Uzbekistan's independence, great importance was attached to planting exotic and subtropical crops to replace the year-round weedy chinar.

In the city streets, squares, alleys and near administrative buildings began to be planted:

- exotic palm trees;
- ornamental trees;
- deciduous trees.

Conifers have been well established in Andijan for many decades, and over the last 25 years firs and other coniferous trees have become very popular in the city (especially Picea abies and blue spruce, juniper, cypress, pine and cedar).

Chestnuts and walnuts are also being planted in Andijan, almonds, pistachios, Diospyros, Elaeagnus angustifolia, jujube, pomegranate trees, wine trees (yellow and black figs), laurus and various fruit trees are grown in courtyards.

== Demographics ==
In 2022, Andijan had a population of 458,500. Representatives of many ethnic groups can be found in the city. Uzbeks are the largest ethnic group.

Historical population
Year	Pop.	±% p.a.
1897	57,000	—
1939	105,000	+1.47%
1959	161,000	+2.16%
1970	188,000	+1.42%
1985	275,000	+2.57%
2000	333,400	+1.29%
2010	373,800	+1.15%
2022	458,500	+1.72%

== Economy ==
Andijan has been an important craft and trade center in the Fergana Valley since the 15th century. After annexation by the Russians in 1876, the economy of the city started to grow significantly. Several industrial plants were built in Andijan after the city was connected with Russia with a railway line in 1889. Several hospitals, pharmacies, banks, and printing houses were established in the city during that period. After Soviet rule was established in late December 1917, both light and heavy industries developed significantly. Andijan became the first city in Uzbekistan to be fully supplied with natural gas.

Andijan remains an important industrial city in independent Uzbekistan. There are 48 large industrial plants and about 3,000 small and medium enterprises in the city. Manufactured goods produced in the city include chemicals, domestic appliances, electronics, foodstuffs, furniture, plows, pumps, shoes, spare parts for farming machines, various engineering tools, and wheelchairs. Andijan is also home to over 50 international companies, five of which produce spare parts for GM Uzbekistan.

== Etymology ==
The etymology of the name of the city of Andijan is complex and yet to be fully determined, involving as it does not only the speculation of certain scholars but also the cautious interpretation of several local folk legends:

- The emergence of the city is associated with the name of the Turanian princess Adinajan, daughter of Afrosiab, the legendary ruler of ancient Turan. In search of a cure for her chronic ill-health, the ailing princess sought and found healing in one of the mountain valleys of the foothills of Takht-e Soleymān. To commemorate her miraculous recovery, Afrosiab built for his beloved daughter a castle, surrounded by a great and wondrous garden, in the lush valley which had restored her to health. Consequently this area, located in the lower reaches of the mountain river Oshsay, was named Adinajan, after the princess, and the city, which later grew up around her castle, was given the name Andijan, a modified form of her name. To do her further honour, the doting Afrosiab made Andijan the capital of his majestic kingdom of Turan.
- The origin of the toponym is directly connected with the Turkic-speaking peoples "Adok", "Azok" and "Andi". Folk rumor says that in ancient times these lands were inhabited by the Andi tribe, i.e. Hindus, and therefore the area was called "Andukan" (or "Hindu refuge").
- The name of the city is connected with the name of the so-called "discoverer" of the region, who laid the foundation of the future city. His name was Andi. So, in honor of the ancient builder-architect the city was named "Andijan".
- Russian historian V. P. Nalivkin supposes that the toponym "Andigan" appeared due to the name of the Turkic tribe Andi. The fact is that until some time residents of neighboring regions often called Andijan Uzbeks by the name of Andi, and claimed that Andi were of the same origin as those Turks who lived in the cities of Central Asia.
- According to Vasily Bartold, Andijan was founded by Mongol Khans at the end of the XIII century. Turks from different tribes and clans were transferred here. At the end of the XV century Andijan was considered a predominantly Turkic city in Fergana.
- The state of Andia existed in the southern part of the Caspian Sea.
- Andi is a place of meeting and kurultais of Turkic tribes to solve friendly and important issues.

== Education ==
There are four higher education institutions in Andijan City. Andijan state university, Andijan medical institute, Andijan machine-building institute and Andijan branch Tashkent state agrarian university. The Andijan Medical Institute is the largest of the four. In 2022, Andijan state institute of foreign languages was founded, being the only state institute where foreign languages are taught. The city is also home to four colleges, one academic lyceum, 21 vocational schools, 47 secondary schools, three music and art schools, nine sports schools, and 86 kindergartens.

== Main sights ==
Andijan Jame Mosque Complex architectural monument (late 19th century). It consists of a mosque, a madrasa, and a minaret. In the mid-19th century, the city status was granted to settlements with a mosque in Uzbekistan. The construction of the Mosque Complex took place from 1883 to 1890 and it covers a total area of 1.5 hectares.

Devonaboy Jome Masjid, built in 1899 in Andijan's old town (Eski Shahar in Uzbek). It was built by the wealthy merchant Devonaboy, and was Andijan's Friday Mosque until the beginning of the Soviet era, where most mosques in the Turkestan ASSR and later the Uzbek SSR were closed for namaaz. However, the mosque opened again in 1944, and has been continuously operating since then, with major restoration works occurring in 2014. It is built right in the center of Andijan, and the dome is the traditional Timurid style onion dome.

== Notable people ==
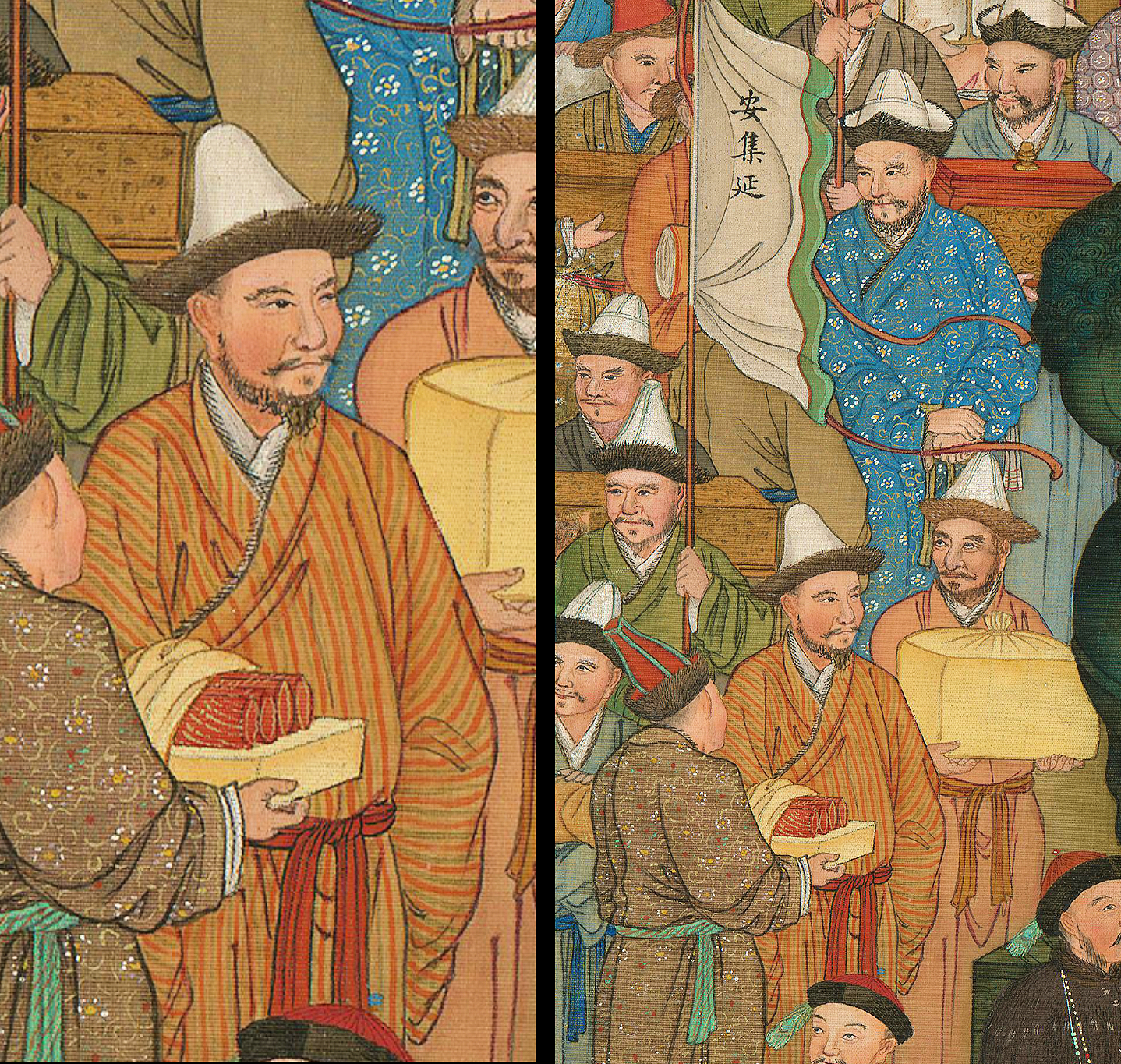
Andijan (安集延) delegates in Peking in 1761. 万国来朝图

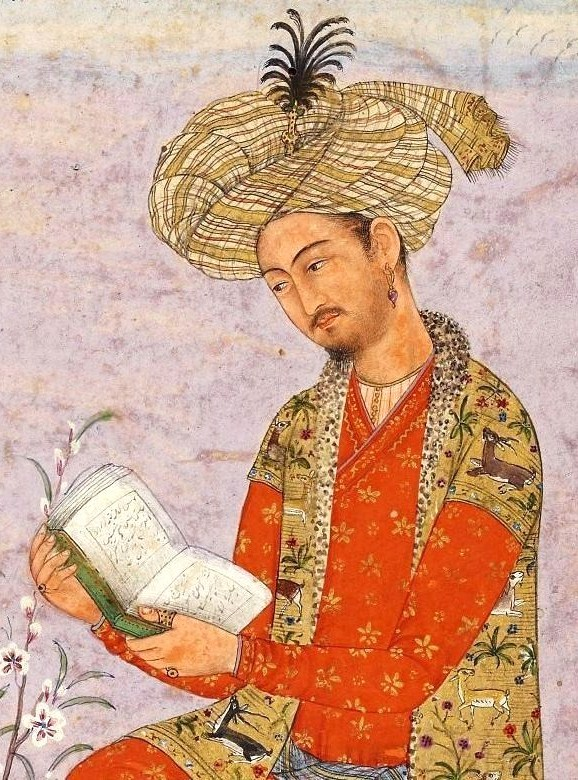
Portrait of Babur, the founder of the Mughal Empire

- Babur (1483–1530) — an emperor and founder of the Mughal Empire in Medieval India
- Nodira (1792–1842) — a poet and stateswoman
- Choʻlpon (1897–1938) — an influential poet, playwright, novelist, and literary translator
- Abbos Bakirov (1910–1974) — a film actor and director, People's Artist of Uzbekistan (1939)
- Halima Nosirova (1913–2003) — an influential opera singer, People's Artist of Uzbekistan (1937)
- Khadicha Sulaimanova (1913-1965) — law professor, Chair of the Supreme Court of the Uzbek SSR
- Mukarram Turgʻunboyeva (1913–1978) — dancer, People's Artist of Uzbekistan (1937); generally regarded as the founder of modern Uzbek stage dance
- Fotima Borukhova (1916–2009) — opera singer, People's Artist of Uzbekistan (1950)
- Shahodat Rahimova (1919–1979) — singer and actress, People's Artist of Uzbekistan (1940)
- Muhammad Yusuf (1954–2001) — poet and a member of the Supreme Assembly of Uzbekistan, People's Poet of Uzbekistan (1998)
- Robert Ilatov (born 1971) — Israeli politician and member of the Knesset for Yisrael Beiteinu.
- Ruslan Chagaev (born 1978) — WBA heavyweight boxing champion
