= Tamara Shakirova =

Soviet actress (1955–2012)

- Tamara Halimovna Shokirova
- Born: October 16, 1955; Tashkent, Uzbek SSR, USSR
- Died: February 12, 2012 (aged 56); Tashkent, Uzbekistan
- Education: Uzbekistan State Institute of Arts and Culture
- Occupation: Actress
- Years active: 1970-1988
- Organization: Uzbekfilm
- Spouse: Otabek Hotamovich Gʻaniev
- Children: Rayhon, Nasiba Nigʻmonova
- Awards: Artist of the Uzbek SSR

Tamara Halimovna Shokirova (born November 26, 1955, in Tashkent, Uzbek SSR) was a Soviet and Uzbek film actress. She was an Honored Artist of the Uzbek SSR (1983) and a laureate of the State Prize of the Uzbek SSR Named After Hamza (1983).

== Biography ==
Tamara Ganieva (formerly Shakirova) was born on November 26, 1955, in Tashkent, Uzbek SSR. She began her career in cinema at the age of 14, playing a minor role as a student in the 1970 film "Slepoy dojd" directed by Anatoly Kabulov[10]. She appeared in numerous films, creating several memorable female characters, including roles in "Eto bilo v Kokande,"Xorezmiyskaya legenda," "Semurg," and "Fiery Roads".

From 1973, she worked as an actress at the "Uzbekfilm" film studio. She completed her studies in the correspondence department of the acting faculty at the A. Ostrovsky Tashkent Theater and Art Institute (1974-1976), now the Uzbekistan State Institute of Arts and Culture.

She died from cancer on February 22, 2012.

== Family ==
Her husband was Otabek Khatamovich Ganiev (deceased in 1985), the grandson of the renowned Soviet and Uzbek film director Nabi Ganiev. They had two children, Rayhon was born in 1978 and the younger one, Nasiba Nigmanova was born in 1994.

== Awards ==
- State Prize of the Uzbek SSR named after Hamza (1983)
- People's Artist of the Uzbek SSR (1983)

== Filmography ==
During her career, she played roles in many films:

- 1970 - "Slepoy dojd" - (Minor role)
- 1970 - "Под палящим солнцем"
- 1970 - "Integral" - Bride
- 1971 - "Bez straxa" - Gulshara
- 1971 - "Zdes proxodit granitsa" - Aman's Bride
- 1972 - "Semurg" - Zubeida
- 1973 - "Moy dobriy chelovek" - Saida
- 1973 - "Pobeg iz tmi" - Rano (dubbed by Valentina Tezhik)
- 1974 - "Abu Rayhan Beruni" - Zarrin Gis, daughter of Kabus
- 1974 - "Glavniy den" - Tamara
- 1975 - "Vishe tolko oblaka"
- 1975 - "Kratkiye vstrechi na dolgoy voyne" - Gulshod
- 1976 - "Yettinchi jin" - Firuza, daughter of the Padishah
- 1977 - "Dom pod jarkim solnsem" - Oydin
- 1977 - "Eto bilo v Kokande" - Halima
- 1978 - "Xorezmiyskaya legenda" - Malika
- 1978-1984 - "Fiery Roads" - Yulduzhon, stepmother of Zubeida (voiced by Natalia Gvozdikova)
- 1979 - "Seroye dixaniye drakona" (GDR) - Sathanasai
- 1979 - "Vozdushnie peshexodi" - Zamira
- 1980 - "Leningradsi, deti moyi" – Khadicha
- 1980 - "Sedmaya pyatnitsa" - Aziza
- 1981 - "Nepokornaya" - Jumagul
- 1983 - "Na perevale ne strelyat!" - Fatima, the niece of Aunt Khafiyat
- 1983 - "Parol — «Otel Regina»" - Kholniso
- 1983 - "Semeynie tayni" (Tajikfilm) - Dilbar
- 1985 - "Bəyin oğurlanması" (Azerbaijanfilm) - Nigar
- 1986 - "Almazniy poyas" - Vazira
- 1988 - "Peyzaj glazami sprintera" - Damira
- 1988 - "Chudovishe ili kto-to drugoy"
- 1989 - "Kodeks molchaniya"
- 1989 - "Sin"
- 1990 - "Ultugan"
- 1991 - "Temir erkak"
- 1991 - "Smert prokurora" - Halima Bazieva, prosecutor
- 1992 - "अलिफ़ लैला"(Alif Leyla)(Uzbekistan, India)
- 1992 - "Dallol" (Uzbekistan)
- 1993 - "Olov ichidagi farishta" (Uzbekistan)
- 1993 - "Qırmızı qatar" (Azerbaijanfilm)
- 1997 - "Men xohlayman" (Uzbekistan, Japan)
- 1998 - "Tilsimoy, gʻaroyib qizaloq" (Uzbekistan)

== See also ==
- Dilbar Abdulazizova
- Munavvara Abdullayeva
