= Muyassar Temirova =

Uzbek jeweler

- Born: Muyassar Temirova; February 2, 1941 (age 85); Bukhara, Uzbek SSR, Soviet Union
- Occupation: Jeweler
- Years active: 1959–present
- Known for: Gold embroidery
- Notable work: Panels for the 525th anniversary of Alisher Navoi, gilded portraits of historical figures of Uzbekistan, curtains for the palaces of “Friendship of Peoples” and “Turkestan”

Muyassar Temirova (Uzbek: Muyassar Temirova; born February 2, 1941, Bukhara) is an Uzbek jeweler. In 1972, she was awarded the title People's Artist of Uzbekistan, and in 1995 she received the title of Hero of Uzbekistan.

== Biography ==
Muyassar Temirova was born in 1941 in the city of Bukhara. After graduating from school in 1959, she became an apprentice at a gold embroidery factory. Her first teacher was the People's Artist of the Republic, Maxsuma Ahmedova. Talented and hardworking, Muyassar successfully mastered the technical and artistic techniques of gold embroidery.

Muyassar was one of the leading masters of the gold embroidery factory of Bukhara. In 1970, by order of the Republican House of Models for the EXPO-70 exhibition in Japan, she created a women's gold embroidery set. Temirova actively participated and directly supervised the production of a unique panel for the 525th anniversary of Alisher Navoi. She also took part in the production of panels of the mausoleum of Ismail Samani, the Minaret of Kalon, the Flag and the Coat of Arms of Uzbekistan. Muyassar created gilded portraits of historical figures of Uzbekistan and took part in sewing curtains for the palaces of “Friendship of Peoples” and “Turkestan”.

Since 1972, Temirova has participated in republican and international exhibitions, her works are stored in museums and collections of the republic and abroad. In 1972, she was awarded the high title of “People’s Artist of Uzbekistan” (Uzbek: Ўзбекистон халқ рассоми).

The creative works of Muyassar Temirova were exhibited at various international exhibitions, organized in more than ten countries. Her works in France, Germany, USA, Italy, Switzerland were highly appreciated by specialists and awarded diplomas and valuable prizes.
