= Maryam Yakubova (actress) =

- Born: 9 October 1909
- Died: 2 February 1987 (aged 77)
- Awards: People's Artist of the Uzbek SSR

Maryam Yakubova (Uzbek: Maryam Yoqubova; 9 October 1909 – 2 February 1987) was an Uzbek actress of the Soviet era.

Yakubova was born in Bukhara, the daughter of a worker in a cotton factory. In her childhood she lived in the household of the emir of Bukhara. Early in life she was forced into an arranged marriage, but soon she escaped and traveled to Moscow to study, graduating in 1928. Returning home, she began a career as a stage actress. She also began to work in film, her first role in the medium coming in 1925. During World War II she performed for soldiers at the front with other artists from the Uzbek SSR. She continued her film career, working with Tajikistani and Uzbekistani directors. She also appeared often on radio, and made many appearances on television as well. For her work, she was awarded the title of People's Artist of the Uzbek SSR in 1955; during her career she also received two of the Order of the Badge of Honour, as well as numerous medals, diplomas, and other awards. She died in Tashkent.
