= Samandar Hamroqulov =

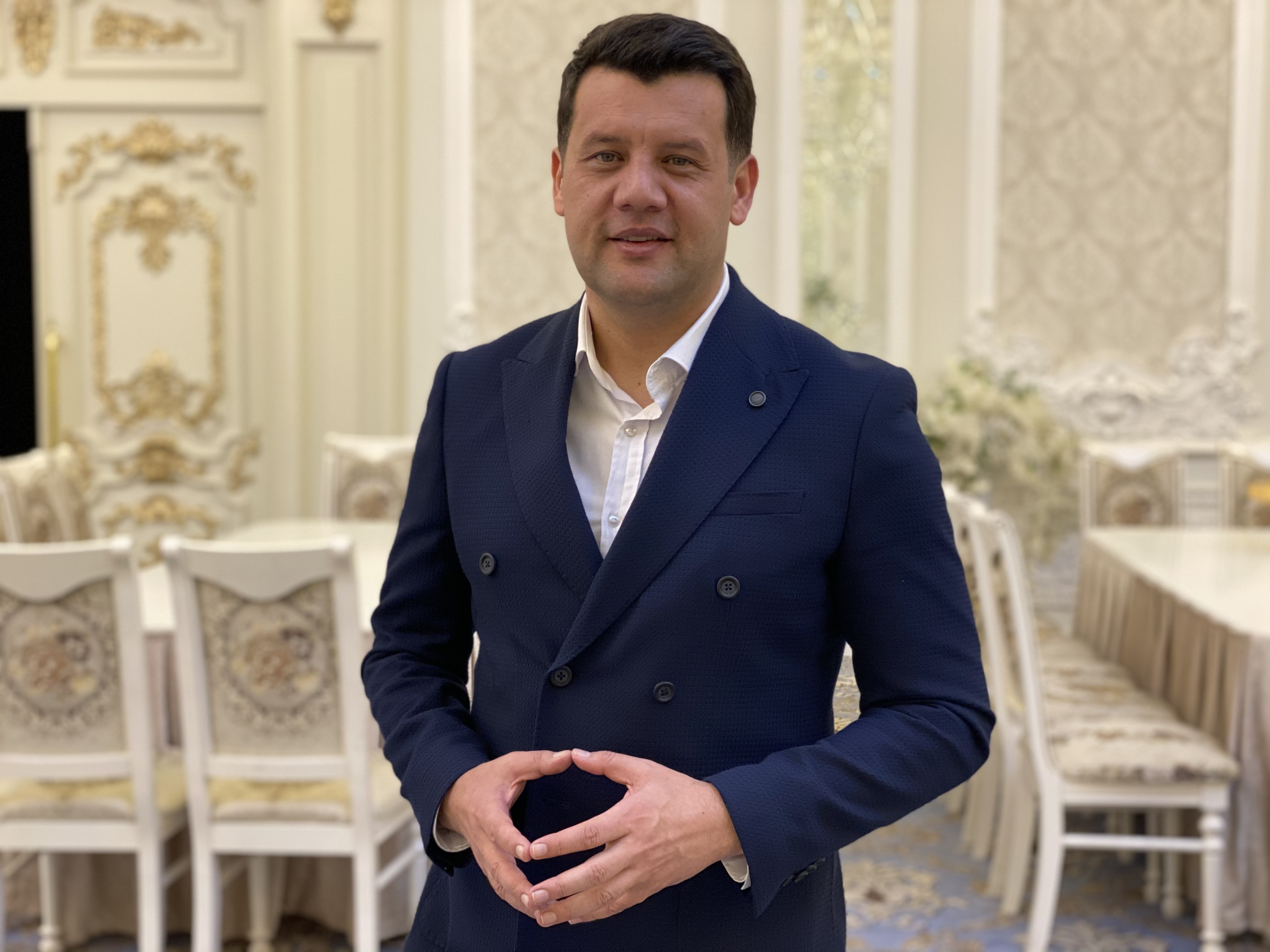

Background information
- Born: Samandar Rustamalievich Khamrakulov; 23 December 1978 (age 47); Namangan, Uzbek SSR, Soviet Union
- Origin: Namangan, Uzbekistan
- Genres: Pop, Uzbek music
- Occupations: Singer, actror
- Years active: 1999–present
- Label: RizaNova
- Website: samandarhamraqulov.com

Samandar Hamroqulov (sometimes spelled Samandar Khamrakulov in English) (Uzbek: Samandar Hamroqulov, Russian: Самандар Хамрокулов) born 23 December 1978), is an Uzbek pop singer, actor, Honored Artist of Uzbekistan (2007). Samandar became famous in Uzbekistan in 2002 with the song "Sevgi fazosi". He sings in both Uzbek and Russian.

In addition to singing, Samandar also plays a role in films. Samandar played his first starring role in the 1999 film "Chayon Gul". His role in the 2005 film "Yarim baxt" brought Samandar even more popularity. After these successes, Samandar starred in several films.

== Biography ==
He was born on December 23, 1978, in Namangan in the family of Rustam Hamroqulov. He went to school No. 2 named after Farobi in Namangan. From 1996 to 2000 he studied at the Faculty of Musical Drama of the Tashkent State Institute of Arts. The main reason Samandar entered the arts was because he was born into a comedian family. The singer is best known for his song "Sevgi fazosi", which is the first work of the singer. Later, the soundtrack "Sen o'zing" from "Muhabbat sinovlari" by Rustam Sadiev, shot in 2002, became very popular and became a hit. The singer also tried his hand at acting and had some success. Samandar married Dilnoza Mamatova on August 10, 2007.

=== Family ===
- Father, Hamroqulov Rustamali Ikromalievich (1953-1989) — Laureate of the Order of Lenin of the USSR, Honored Artist of the Uzbek SSR.
- Mother, Yuldasheva Mavluda Mamadaliyevna (1953) — philologist (teacher of native language and literature of the highest category).
- Brother, Hamroqulov Iskandar Rustamalievich (1977) — actor, comedian.
- Sister, Hamroqulova Sevara Rustamaliyevna (1981) — satire theater actress.
- Wife, Hamroqulova (Mamatova) Dilnoza Alisherovna (1989) — philologist (French teacher).

== Acting career ==
Samandar has portrayed main characters in several Uzbek movies. Yarim baxt, in which Samandar played the lead role, did well in box office and Samandar received positive reviews for his role. He also played the leading role in the 2017 Uzbek movie "Notanish yulduzlar". The soundtrack for the movie "Sevgi fazosi" was sung by Samandar himself. Samandar played at movie celled Yangi boy which was popular among uzbek people.

== Discography ==
=== Studio albums ===
- "Sevgi fazosi" (2002)
- "Samandar tangosi" (2005)

== Filmography ==
This is a chronologically-ordered list of films in which Samandar has appeared.

Year	Title	Role	Ref
1999	Chayon gul	Ashur	
2002	Muhabbat sinovlari	Bobur	
2003	Taqdir	Jamshid	
2004	Muhabbatimsan		
2005	Yarim baxt		
2007	Yangi boy	Qobiljon	
2010	Arzanda	Jasur	
2013	Gumroxlar		
2017	Notanish yulduz	Samandar	

== Awards ==
- Winner in the nomination "Tarona Taqdimoti - 2002" - "Novelty of the Year in Music".
- Winner "Nihol-2003".
- Winner in the nomination "Tarona Taqdimoti - 2004" - "Singer of the Year".
- In 2007 he was awarded the title of "Honored Artist of Uzbekistan".
