= Andijan State University =

University in Andijan, Uzbekistan

- Zahiriddin Muhammad Bobur nomidagi Andijon davlat universiteti
- Former names: Andijan State University
- Established: 1939
- Rector: Yuldashev Akramjon Sultanmuradovich
- Administrative staff: 524
- Students: 7,054
- Undergraduates: 6,905
- Postgraduates: 149
- Location: Andijan, Andijan Region, Uzbekistan; 40.78811°N 72.37256°E
- Language: Uzbek, Russian
- Website: http://www.adu.uz

Andijan State University (named after Z. M. Bobur, and often abbreviated as ASU or ADU) is a university in Andijan, eastern Uzbekistan. It was founded in 1939 as a branch of Fergana Pedagogical Institute. Today, 6905 undergraduate students and 149 postgraduate students are enrolled at the university. According to the information provided by the Ministry of Higher and Secondary Specialized Education of the Republic of Uzbekistan there are 31 Professors, 151 PhD, 144 assistant professors and 198 assistant teachers.

== Faculties ==
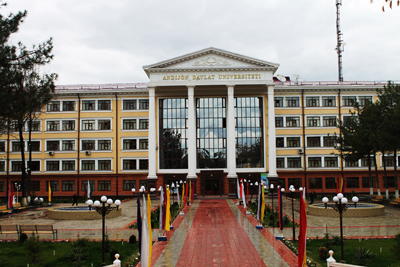
Andijan State University

University faculties

- Physics-Mathematics
- Philology
- History
- Natural and Geography
- Foreign Languages
- Physical Education
- Pedagogy
- Primary Education Methodology
- Social and Economic Sciences
