= Andijan Jame Mosque Complex =

Islamic complex in Andijan, Uzbekistan

- Andijon jome masjidi majmuasi (Uzbek)
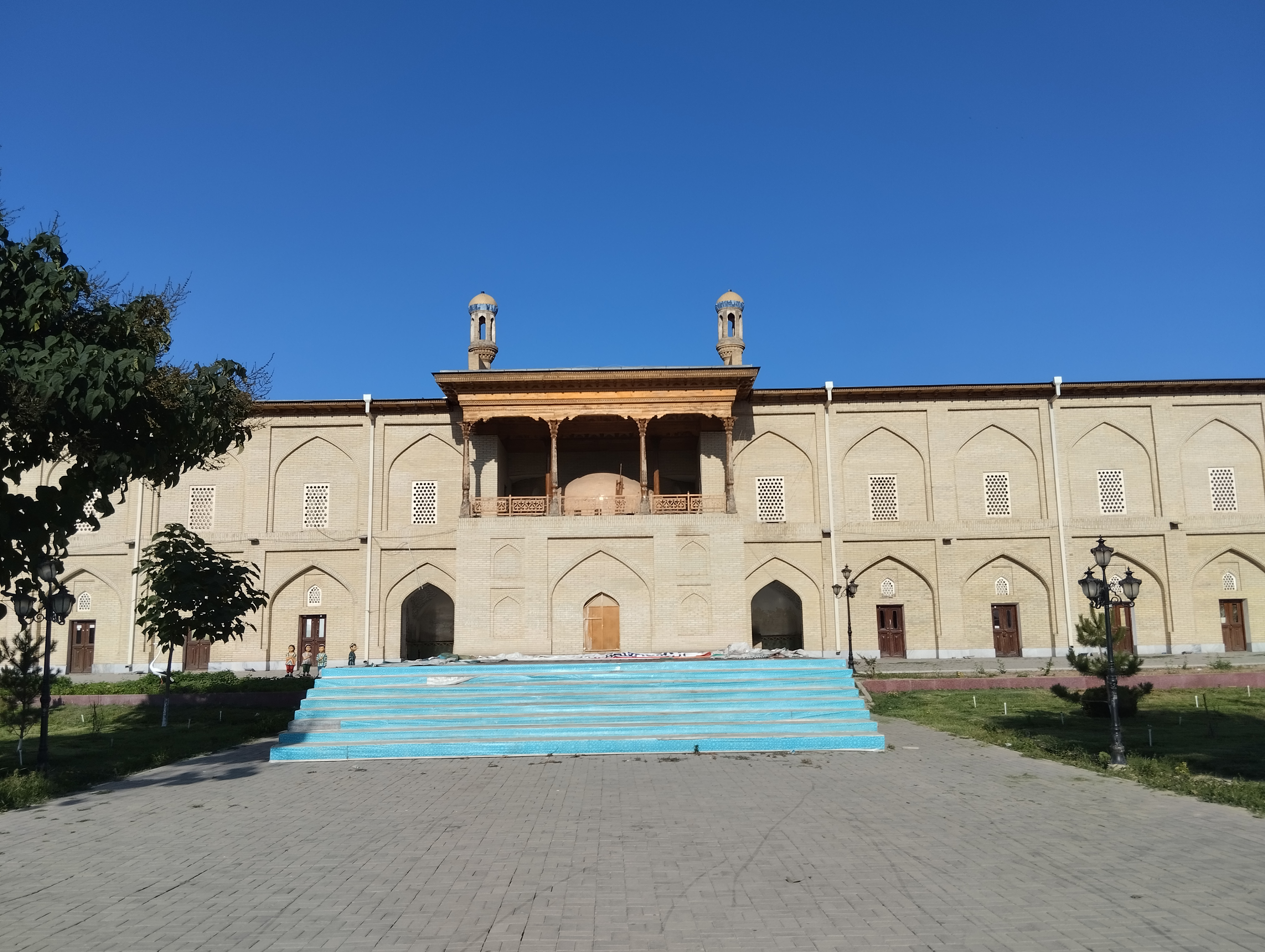
- Andijan Jame Mosque
- Interactive map of Andijan Jame Mosque Complex
- 40.7882°N 72.3453°E
- Location: Andijan, Uzbekistan
- Nearest city: Andijan

History
- Built: 1883-1890
- Built for: Mosque, Madrasa

Site notes
- Restored: 1971—1974, 1999 — 2000, 2018
- Current use: Mosque

Andijan Jame Mosque Complex is an architectural monument (late 19th century). It consists of a mosque, a madrasa, and a minaret. In the mid-19th century, the city status was granted to settlements with a mosque in Uzbekistan. Complex Jami took place from 1883 to 1890. The total area of the complex is 1.5 hectares. Within the complex, the Andijon Region Literary and Art Museum is located.

== Madrasa ==
The length of the madrasa is 123 meters. The central entrance of the madrasa is adorned with traditional arched portals in the shape of a dome. Decorative pointed small minarets are elevated on either side of the entrance section of the facade. The walls of the building are adorned with patterns and mosaics in traditional blue and green colors, typical for the architecture of the Fergana Valley. Initially, the madrasa was built in the shape of the letter 'U' and was open-air. The main elements of the internal design of the madrasa are geometric patterned lattice screens, niches, and alcoves. The Jame Mosque complex, like the madrasa, has a unique scale – it is located in the western part of the architectural ensemble, and its main facade consists of 26 arches. At the top of the minaret, a dome-like base and a small octagonal dome are installed, with a crescent moon on top. The central and upper parts of the minaret are adorned with decorative domes and a carved girdle. The building's facade is a masterpiece with scenic-decorative and fruit trees around it. The main entrance of the madrasa is facing east and is constructed with an elevated porch. A pointed arch is elevated on each side of it. Corner minarets with domes are located on either side. Gazebos with domes are in the corners of the walls of the first floor. The altar arches of the second-floor cells add charm to the main entrance.

== Mosque ==
Jame Mosque in Andijon is an active congregational mosque in the city. The mosque is located in the western part of the complex. Its architecture features a correctly angled courtyard with three sides of a row of elevated, arched, and domed Iwans. The minaret is situated in the courtyard. With a height of 32 meters, the minaret is the tallest in the entire Fergana Valley, featuring an octagonal first-tier gallery built above an eight-sided base wall. The mosque has five entrances (one in the south and two each from the north and east). The Andijon Jame Mosque complex was constructed with the participation of architects such as Isaxon, Yusufali Musayev, and other craftsmen. It suffered damage in the earthquake of 1902. The buildings underwent renovations in 1971–1974 and 1999–2000. The complex is included in the list of cultural heritage sites and the UNESCO World Heritage List.

== The new building of the mosque ==
The construction of the new building of the Jame Mosque began in 2018 and was completed in May of the same year. The new building is constructed in the style of ancient four-Iwans and four-entrance structures. On each of its two sides, there are 54-meter minarets and a dome with a diameter of 18 meters is built at the top of the main building. While the previous mosque was designed for 5,000 worshippers, the new building can accommodate more than 15,000 prayer attendees. The opening ceremony of the new building of the Jome Mosque was attended by Shavkat Mirziyoyev.

== Gallery ==
Gallery

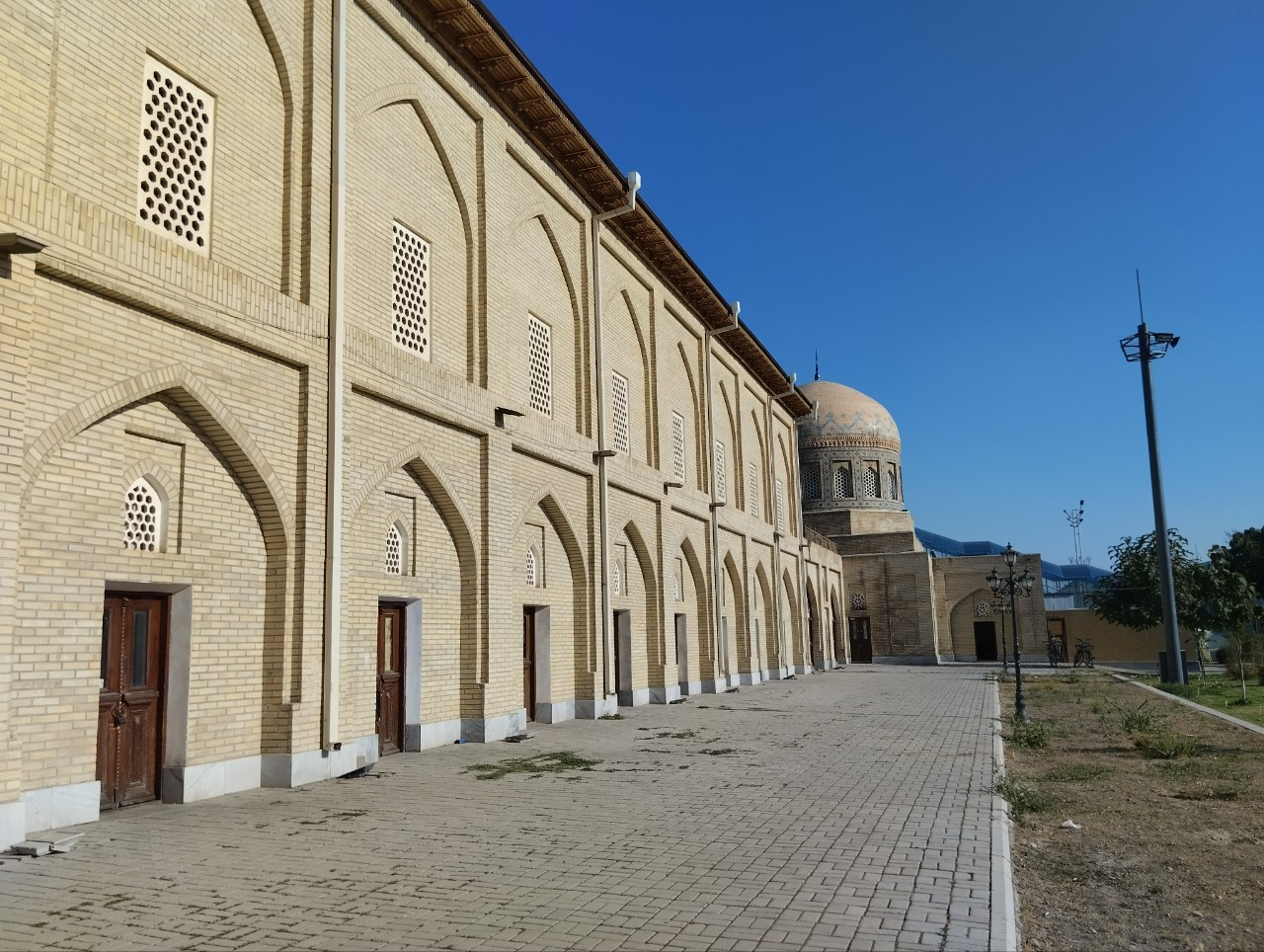

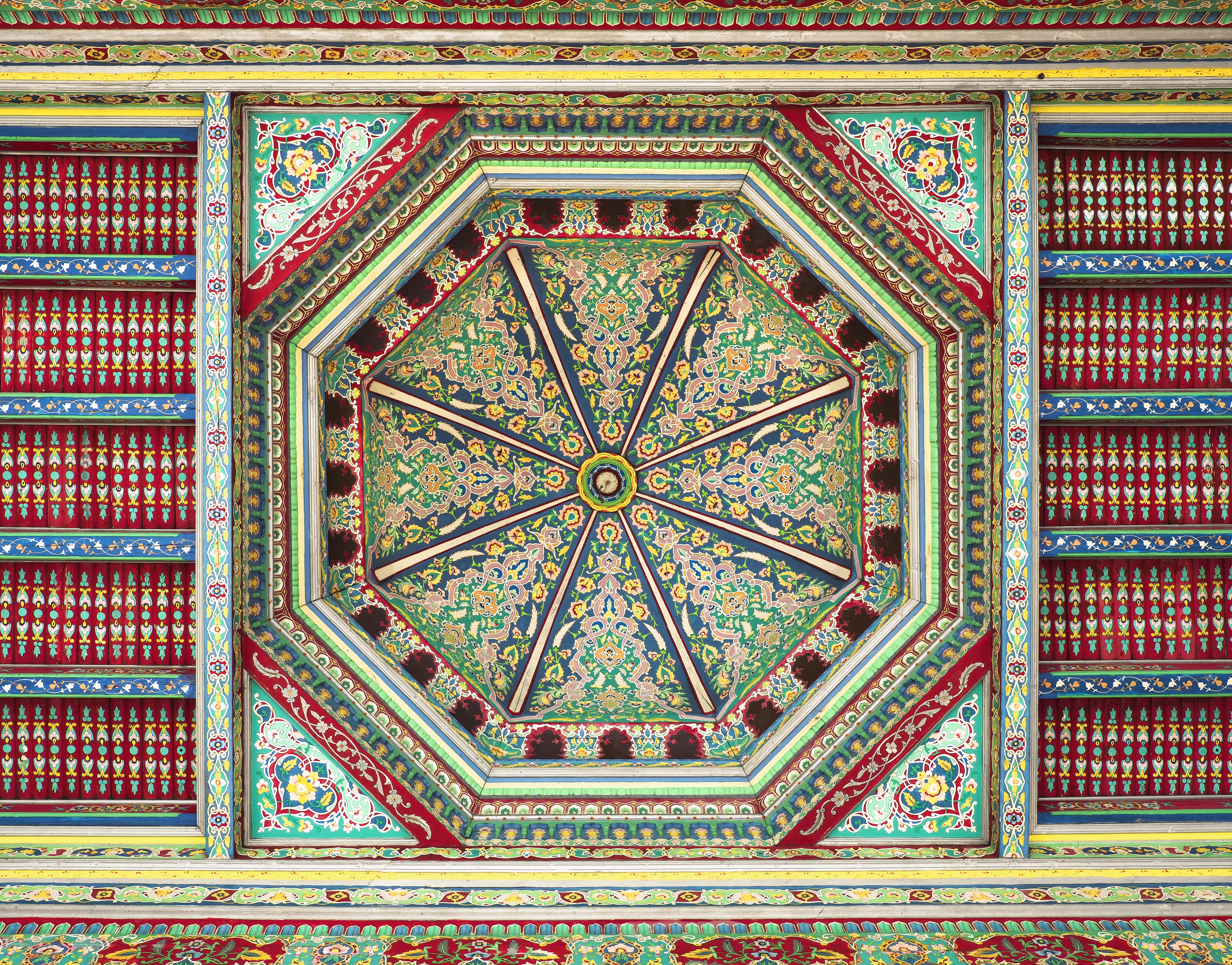

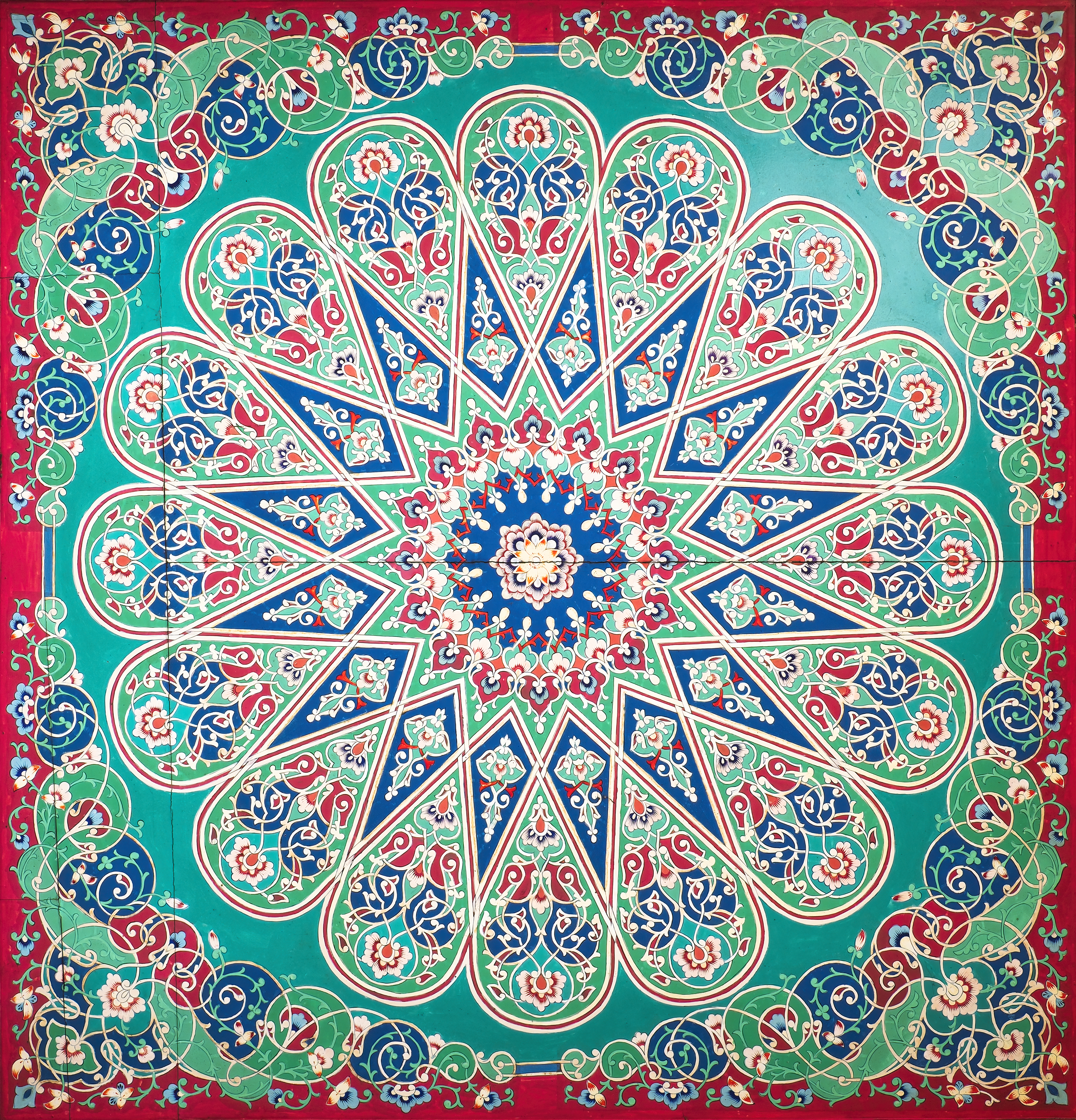

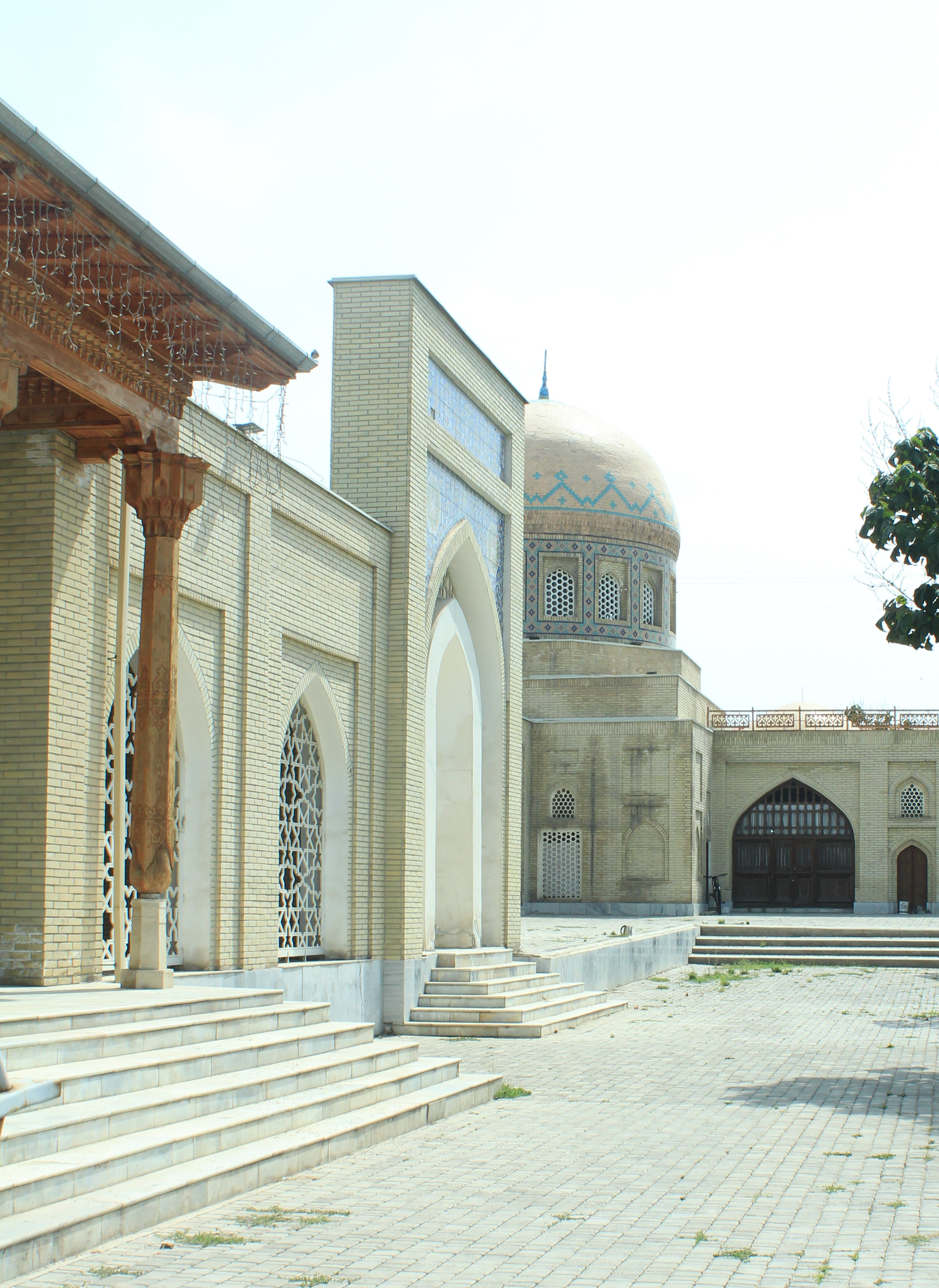

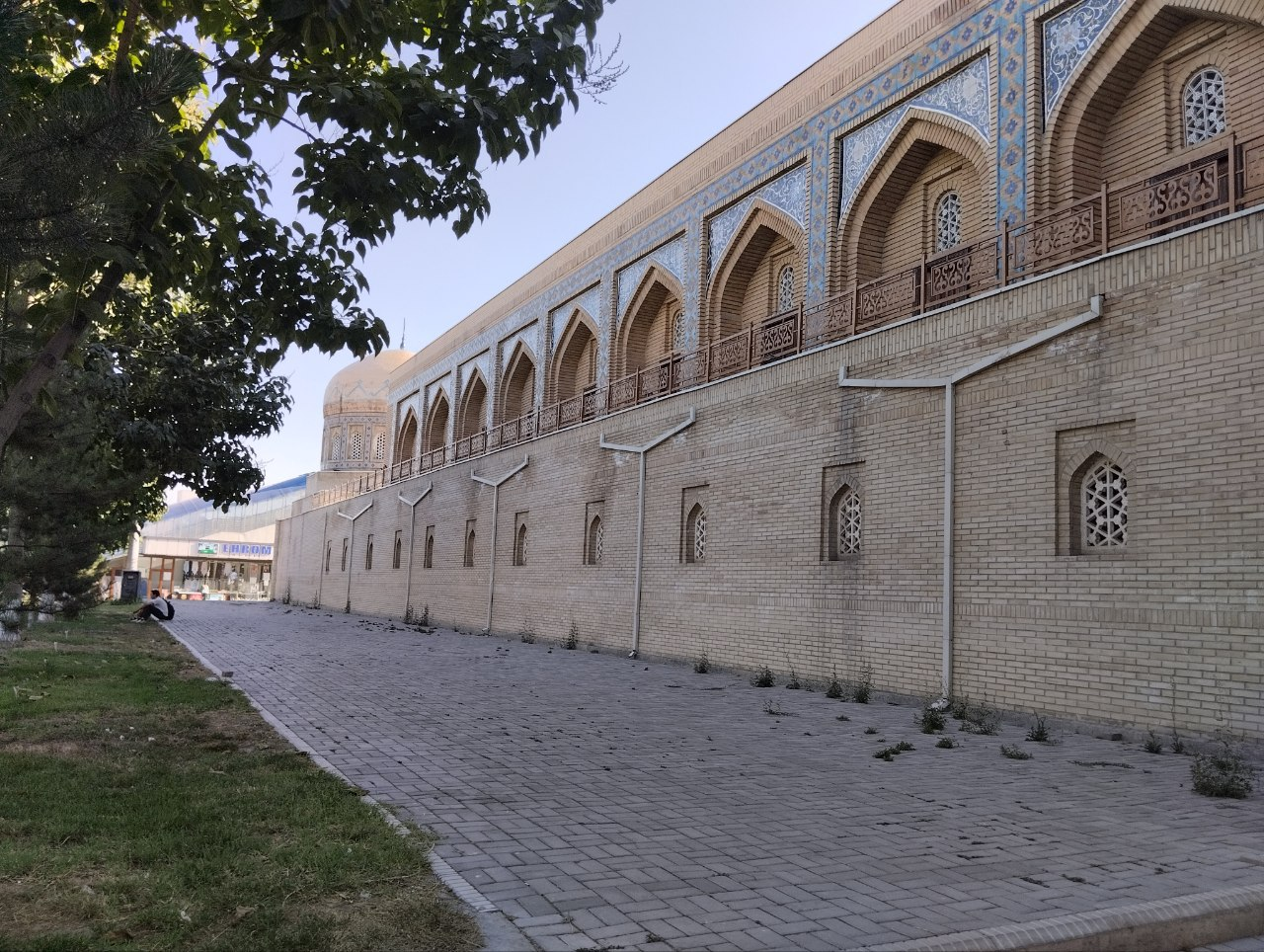
