= Bernara Karieva =

- Bernora Qoriyeva
- Born: 28 January 1936 (age 90); Tashkent, Uzbek SSR, Soviet Union
- Occupations: Ballet dancer; choreographer; teacher
- Years active: 1955–present
- Political party: Communist Party of the Soviet Union
- Children: 2

Bernara Rakhimovna Karieva (Note: Uzbek: Bernora Rahimovna Qoriyeva; Russian: Бернара Рахимовна Кариева, romanized: Bernara Rakhimovna Kariyeva) (born 28 January 1936) is a Soviet and Uzbekistani former ballet dancer, prima ballerina, choreographer and politician. She was prima ballerina of the Navoi Theater from 1956 to 1996 and its artistic director between 1994 and 2002. Karieva ran the Youth Ballet of Uzbekistan community from 1979 to 1983 and chaired both the Union of Theater Workerds and the Coordinating Council for South-East Asian theaters. She was an elected deputy of the Congress of People's Deputies of the Soviet Union from 1989 to 1991 and was on the Committee of the Commission of the Council of Nationalities on the Development of Culture, Language, National and International Traditions, Protection of Historical Heritage. Karieva has received various state awards such as the Order of the Badge of Honour, the People's Artist of the USSR, the USSR State Prize and the Order of the Red Banner of Labour.

== Early life ==
She was born on 28 January 1936, in Tashkent, Uzbek Soviet Socialist Republic. She is the daughter of the former director of the Perm Opera and Ballet Theatre and she was brought to view his productions. Karieva had her stage debut in the ballet Ak-belyak although her mother opposed her daughter being on stage. From 1947 to 1951, she studied at the Uzbek Choreographic School (today the Tashkent State Higher School of National Dance and Choreography). Karieva is a 1955 graduate of the Moscow Choreographic School (today the Moscow State Academy of Choreography) and was taught by Maria Kozhukhova. This came after she was recommended to the school by the dancer Raisa Struchkova and Karieva lived away from her parents.

== Career ==
Following graduation, Karieva was accepted into the Navoi Uzbek Theater of Opera and Ballet in Tashkent. She had rejected offers to remain in Moscow, and she was prima ballerina between 1956 and 1996 before going on to be artistic director from 1994 to 2002. Karieva opened the Youth Ballet of Uzbekistan community in 1979, which she ran until 1983. She combined classical choreography and Uzbek folk dance, allowing choreographers to create their own compositions. Karieva established the private choreographic school called "Style and Dance from Bernarda Karieva" in Tashkent in 2004. She was artistic director rof the opera and choreographic project "Prince Igor. Polovtsian Camp" that was set to Alexander Borodin's music and held at the Navoi Theater in 2021. Karieva is the Professor of the Department of Choreography of the State Academy of Choreography of Uzbekistan. She persuaded the Uzbek government to establish the Union of Theater Workers that she was chair of and was also chair of the Coordinating Council for South-East Asian theaters.

Karieva has performed the roles of Odette-Odile in Tchaikovsky's Swan Lake, Maria in The Fountain of Bakhchisarai by Asafyev, the title role in Anna Karenina by Shchedrin, Mekhri in Leviev's Sukhail' and Mekhri, and Sonni in Ashrafi's The Amulet of Love. She was also a performer as Phrygia in Spartacus, Parasha in The Bronze Horseman, Nina in the Masquerade, the title role in Cinderella, Semurg in Semurg, Rano in Tanovar, Juliet in Romeo and Juliet, Ophelia in Hamlet, Desdemona in The Moor's Pavane, the title role in Madame Bovary, Maryamkhon in The Poisoned Life, the Stranger in The Stranger and the heroine in Elegy among others. Karieva has performed in more than 55 ballet productions.

In 1967, Karieva became a member of the Communist Party of the Soviet Union. She was chair of the board of the Union of Theater Workers of the Uzbek Soviet Socialist Republic/Republic of Uzbekistan from 1985 to 1998. Between 1989 and 1991, Karieva was an elected deputy of the USSR in the Congress of People's Deputies of the Soviet Union. She was on the committee of the Commission of the Council of Nationalities on the Development of Culture, Language, National and International Traditions, Protection of Historical Heritage. Karieva has advised the Minister of Culture of the Republic of Uzbekistan on issues relating to theatre since 2002. She lobbied Uzbek authorities to give the Russian language state status in 2019, and is a representative of the theatres in all four Central Asia republics.

== Personal life ==
Karieva has been twice married and has two children.

== Awards ==
She has been the recipient of various state awards. She was the recipient of a silver medal at the Moscow Choreographic School in 1957, and in 1959, she was awarded the Order of the Badge of Honour, named People's Artist of the Uzbek SSR in 1964, the State Hamza Prize in 1970. She was made a People's Artist of the USSR in 1973. In 1982, Karieva was awarded the USSR State Prize in the literature, art and architecture field and the Order of the Red Banner of Labour four years later. She was given the Certificate of Honor of the Republic of Uzbekistan by President Islam Karimov in 1992. Two years later, Karieva was given the Shukhrat Medal, People's Artist of the Kyrgyz Republic from President Askar Akayev in 1996 and the Fidokorona Hizmatlari Uchun in 2020.
