= People's Artist of Uzbekistan =

- Oʻzbekiston xalq artisti
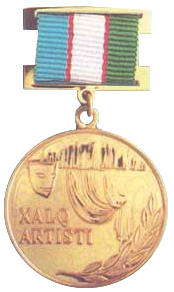
- Type: State award
- Awarded for: Citizens and non-citizens of Uzbekistan for their contribution to art
- Country: Uzbekistan
- Formerly called: People's Artist of the Uzbek SSR

People's Artist of Uzbekistan (Uzbek: Oʻzbekiston xalq artisti) is an honorary title of the Republic of Uzbekistan. It is presented to the prominent artists of theatre, music, film, pop music, circus, TV and radio broadcast who contributed to the development of the art in the republic.

== List of recipients (partial list) ==
- Nasiba Abdullaeva
- Chingiz Akhmarov
- Turgʻun Azizov
- Oybarchin Bakirova
- Fotima Borukhova
- Berta Dovidova
- Reinhold Glière
- Yury Grigorovich
- Razzoq Hamroyev
- Galiya Izmaylova
- Ismoil Jalilov
- Toʻxtasin Jalilov
- Sherali Joʻrayev
- Bernara Karieva
- Tamara Khanum
- Galina Melnikova
- Malik Qayumov
- Nabi Rahimov
- Yunus Rajabiy
- Zaynab Sadriyeva
- Tolib Sodiqov
- Muyassar Temirova
- Mukarram Turgunbaeva
- Maryam Yakubova (actress)
- Akrom Yusupov
- Farrukh Zokirov
- Benjamin Zuskin
- Lyudmila Zykina
