= Jenisbek Piyazov =

Uzbek opera singer (born 1988)

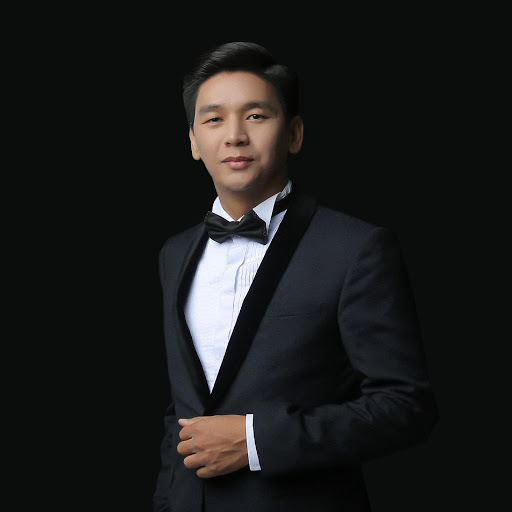
- Jenisbek Piyazov
- Born: Jeńisbek Burkitovich Piyazov; May 9, 1988 (age 38); Nukus, Karakalpak ASSR, Uzbek SSR, Soviet Union
- Occupation: Opera singer (bass-baritone)
- Awards: People's Artist of Uzbekistan (2021); Order "Mehnat shuhrati" (2026)

Jenisbek Burkitovich Piyazov (Karakalpak: Jeńisbek Burkitovich Piyazov; born 9 May 1988) is an Uzbek and Karakalpak opera singer (bass-baritone) from Nukus. He was named People's Artist of Uzbekistan in 2021 and People's Artist of Bashkortostan in 2022. He won the Grand Prix of the second Muslim Magomayev International Vocalists' Competition in 2012.

== Early life and education ==
Piyazov was born in Nukus. He graduated from the vocal department of the Nukus college named after Japaq Shamuratov (class of A. N. Kaliev) in 2004 and entered the State Conservatory of Uzbekistan, where he studied academic singing in the class of Professor S. A. Tsoy.

== Career ==
In 2009 Piyazov joined the Navoi Opera and Ballet Theatre in Tashkent as a trainee. Between 2008 and 2009 he took part in folklore festivals in France, Spain, Malaysia and Portugal; in 2010 he attended master classes in Minsk organised by the International Music Academy of the CIS countries, and in 2011–2012 he was invited to an opera festival in Germany.

In 2014 he took part in the third season of the television project Bolshaya Opera on the Russian channel Kultura. In 2018 he performed at the Chaliapin International Opera Festival in Kazan, and in November of that year took part in a programme of the Accademia d'arte lirica in Osimo, Italy. In 2019 he received the "Best Bass" prize at the Giulio Neri competition.

In an interview published by Radio Ozodlik (RFE/RL Uzbek Service) on 13 November 2019, Piyazov said he had become the first singer from Uzbekistan to perform on the stage of La Scala in Milan.

Piyazov teaches at the State Conservatory of Uzbekistan. In 2022 UzReport described him as an adviser to the Minister of Preschool Education on the development of culture and art.

== Competitions ==
- 2012 – Grand Prix, second Muslim Magomayev International Vocalists' Competition, Moscow.
- 2010 – Second prize and special prize "Hope of Azerbaijan", fifth Bülbül International Vocalists' Competition, Baku.
- First prizes at the 12th International "Kazakh Romansiada" and the 13th Moscow International Competition of Young Performers of Russian Romance.
- 2019 – "Best Bass", Giulio Neri competition.

== Honours ==
- 2010 – Medal "Shuhrat".
- 2012 – Honored Artist of the Republic of Karakalpakstan.
- 2014 – Honored Artist of Uzbekistan.
- 27 November 2020 – Badge of the CIS Interparliamentary Assembly "For merits in the development of culture and art" (Council resolution No. 23).
- 24 August 2021 – People's Artist of Uzbekistan.
- 2022 – People's Artist of the Republic of Bashkortostan.
- 22 August 2026 – Order "Mehnat shuhrati" (decree for the 35th anniversary of independence).
