= Ismoil Mahmadzoir =

Tajik sports administrator

- Исмоил Маҳмадзоир
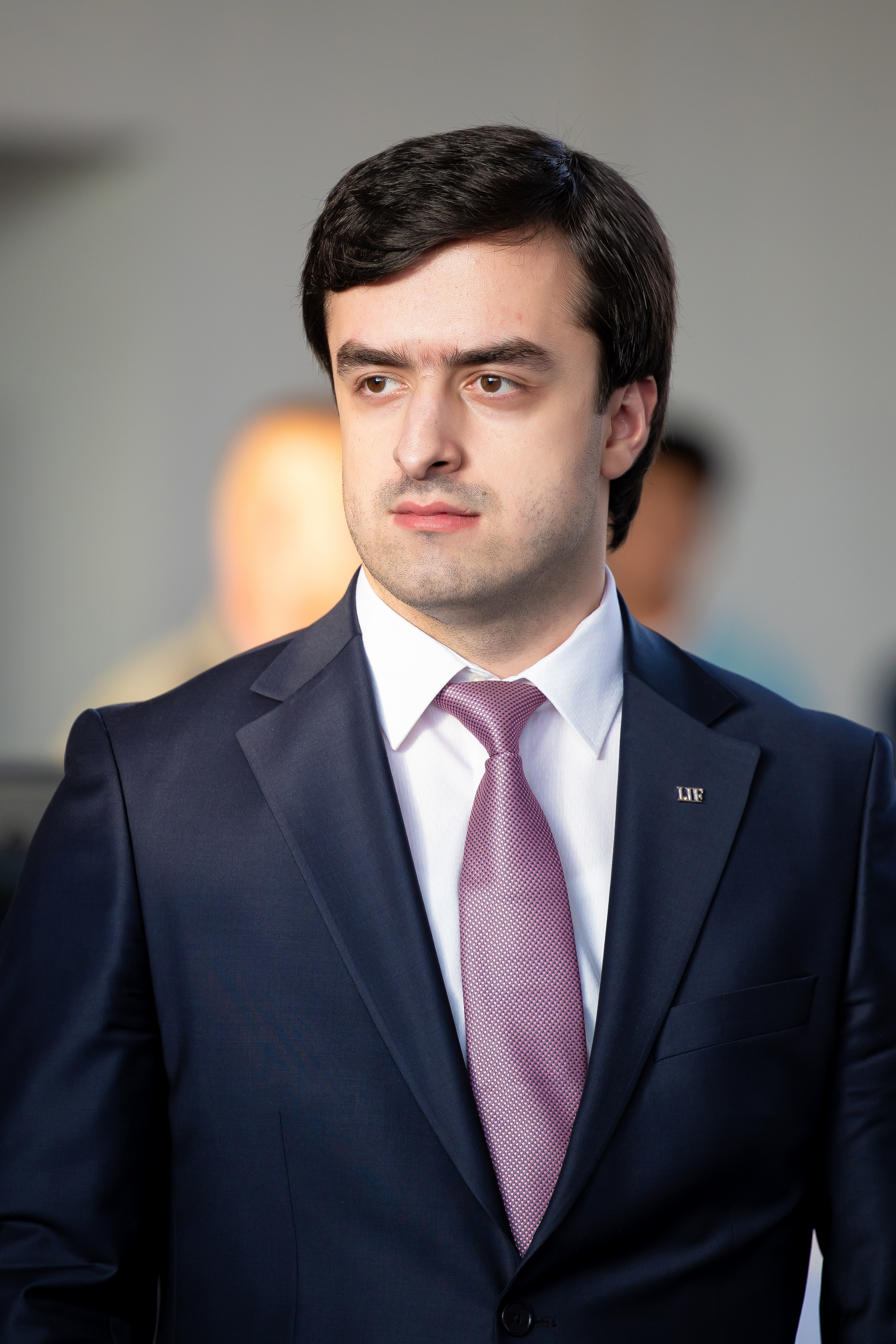
- Ismoil Mahmadzoir in 2022

President of the Judo Federation of Tajikistan
- Incumbent
- Assumed office 19 November 2022

Personal details
- Born: Исмоил Маҳмадзоир; Ismoil Mahmadzoir; 11 July 1995 (age 31) Dushanbe, Tajikistan
- Parent(s): Mahmadzoir Sohibov (father); Firuza Rahmon (mother)
- Education: Tajik National University

Ismoil Mahmadzoir (Tajik: Исмои́л Маҳмадзои́р, romanized: Ismoil Mahmadzoîr/Ismoil Mahmadzoīr; born July 11, 1995, Dushanbe, Tajikistan) In November 2022, he became the new president of the Judo Federation of Tajikistan IJF, and is also the general sponsor of Ravshan Football Club, and a sponsor of eSports of the Republic of Tajikistan. Ismoil is the eldest grandson of the current President of the Republic of Tajikistan, Emomali Rahmon.

== Biography ==
Born on July 11, 1995, in Dushanbe. Ismoil is the son of Firuza Rakhmonova, the eldest daughter of the President of the Republic of Tajikistan and his first son-in-law Mahmadzoir Sokhibov. He studied at the Presidential Lyceum of the city of Dushanbe. In 2018, he graduated from Tajik National University with a degree in Finance and Credit.

== Early life and career ==
In November 2022, he was elected President of the Judo Federation of Tajikistan(IJF). It became known that Ismoil received a new position during an extraordinary pre-election meeting. It was attended by the leadership of the National Olympic Committee, members of the executive committee of the federation, coaches, judges and athletes. The candidacy was supported by all those present. First he created, raised and expanded his activities and when he already had a heritage and a reputation he dedicated himself to financing and sponsoring cultural and sports activities. On the one hand, he builds sports infrastructure, while on the other, he offers material and financial support to Tajik athletes because he has understood that to compete on equal terms, resources must be available.

Ismoil replaced Nurullo Loikov in this position, who resigned at his own request. He expressed gratitude for his trust and added that he would do everything possible to develop judo in the country, support athletes and further increase the sports authority of the state.

He is the founder of the holding company IM GROUP Holding, which is one of the largest private companies in Tajikistan, founded in 2016. He supports the Kulob football team Ravshan and sponsors "Haji Sharif".

== Charity ==
Ismoil provides significant support for the development of sports in Tajikistan, invests and supports various events, tournaments and championships.
