= Berta Dovidova =

Uzbek and Soviet singer

- Born: 20 December 1922; Yazyavan, Uzbekistan
- Died: 1 August 2007 (aged 84); Tashkent, Uzbekistan
- Occupation: singer
- Awards: People’s Artist of the Uzbek SSR, Uzbek State Order of El-Yurt

Berta Dovidova (Uzbek: Берта Довидова; 20 December 1922, Yozyovon – 1 August 2007, Tashkent) (sometimes referred to as Berta Davidova or Davydova) was an Uzbek and Soviet singer and music teacher, and recipient of the People's Artist of the Uzbek SSR (1964). She is best known as the first female performer of maqams, the traditional musical style of Central Asia.

== Life ==
Berta Dovidova was born on 20 December 1922 in Yozyovon, Uzbek SSR. Her parents were Bukharan Jews. When Dovidova was 11 or 12 years old her father died, and she moved with her family to Tashkent to live with her uncle, her mother's brother.

When Dovidova graduated from the 4th grade of school, she was admitted to the Medical College named after Y. Akhunbabayev, and after graduating in 1938 worked until 1941 as a nurse in the old town polyclinic. With the outbreak of the World War II she worked at the Tashkent military hospital for three years.

In 1943, an ensemble led by the noted Uzbek musician and composer Yunus Rajabiy visited the hospital where Dovidova worked, and after hearing Dovidova sing, invited her to work at Tashkent Radio. Davidova joined the choir under the Uzbek Radio and Television Committee in 1943 and became a member of the Uzbek ensemble in 1945.

== Career ==
In 1958, the Maqam ensemble under the State Committee on Television and Radio Broadcasting of Uzbekistan under the leadership of Yunus Rajabiy was created. Dovidova was a leading singer in the Maqam ensemble of the State Committee for Radio and Television beginning in 1960.

Dovidova was the first female performer of maqams, the traditional music style of Central Asia.

In 1964, Dovidova was awarded a title of People's Artist of Uzbek SSR.

Dovidova's repertoire consisted of maqams and classical songs: “Munojot”, “Bayot II”, “Bayot V”, “Nasri bayot”, “Talkini bayot”, “Taronai bayot”, “Samarkand ushshoghi”, “Figon”, “Dugoh”, “Khayolim senda”, classical and modern songs such as "Yor Armugoni", "Dilnavozim", "Gulistonim mening", "Bakht", "Kuylagaiman", "Yodimdasiz". Her songs were included to the “Golden Fund” of Uzbek radio.

In 1975, a TV film “Munojot” (“A prayer”) was shot about Davidova.

In 1999, she was awarded Uzbek State Order of El-Yurt (Honor of Country).

Berta Dovidova died on 1 August 2007 in Tashkent.

In 2013, a Dovidova commemoration meeting took place at the Center for National Arts in Tashkent organized by the Fund Forum and the State Conservatory.

== Personal life ==
In 1948, Dovidova married military doctor Rakhim Makhmudov, but they got divorced soon afterwards. She raised their son alone.

== Awards ==
- Order "El-yurt hurmati" (1998)
- Medal "For Distinguished Labour" (1959)
