= Madina Mumtoz =

Uzbek singer and actress

- Birth name: Musaeva Madinabonu Bahriddin qizi
- Born: 10 October 1990 (age 34); Tashkent, Uzbek SSR, Soviet Union
- Origin: Tashkent, Uzbekistan
- Genres: Pop, Uzbek music
- Occupation(s): Singer, actress
- Years active: 2005–2019

Musaeva Madinabonu Bahriddin qizi (Uzbek: Musayeva Madinabonu Bahriddin qizi, Мусаева Мадинабону Баҳриддин қизи; born 10 October 1990), most commonly known by her stage name Madina Mumtoz, is an Uzbek singer and actress. The singer was awarded the Nihol State Prize in 2010.

Madina has also achieved great success in acting. Madina received widespread recognition and acclaim in Uzbekistan after starring in the 2009 Uzbek drama "Janob hech kim" (Mr. Nobody). Since then she has starred in many Uzbek comedy films. In particular, the films "From myself to myself", which were shown on the big screens in 2010, and "Now My Dad is Single" brought great fame to the actress.

== Biography ==
Madina Mumtoz was born on October 10, 1990, in Tashkent. The singer's father is Musaev Bahriddin Jo'rayevich. Madina is the daughter of well-known actress, Honored Artist of Uzbekistan Rano Yarasheva. The singer studied at the Uzbek Conservatory. The singer has appeared with her mother Rano Yarasheva in several films, including "From Myself to Myself" (2009), "Ichkuyov" (2009), "My Brother is Single" (2011), "Widows" (2012) and "Now My Dad Is Single" (2012). The singer was married in 2012 to businessman Murad Chusti. Today they have three sons. The singer gave birth to children named Muhammad Yusuf in 2013, Muhammad Yunus in 2015 and Yahya in 2020.

== Filmography ==
This is a chronologically ordered list of films in which Madina Mumtoz has appeared.

Year	Title	Role	Source
2007	Lola	Zilola	
2008	Mr Hech kim	Gulzoda	
2009	Achchiq hayot	Madina	
2009	Ichkuyov	Madina	
2009	Oʻzimdan oʻzimgacha	Oysha	
2010	Muhabbatnoma	Zulfiya	
2010	Yuzma yuz	Gulruh	
2011	Mening akam boʻydoq	Zumrad	
2012	Endi dadam boʻydoq	Zumrad	
2012	Qudajonlar	?	
2012	Bevalar	Dildora	

== Discography ==
Year	Album
2013	Bolajon

== Music videos ==
Year	Song
2007	„Fargʻona Ruboiysi“
2010	„Balki“ (with Diyor Mahkamov)
2010	„Qoʻshchinor“
2010	„Qora ko'zima“ (with Samandar Hamraqulov)
2012	„Sallamno“
2013	„Baxtli boʻl“
2014	„Bolajon“
2015	„Ey Yor Jonim“
2015	„Sevishin aytolmadi“
2017	„Nedan“ (with Bahodir Nizomov)

== Awards ==
Madina Mumtoz has received many awards. Most notably "Nihol" which is an Uzbek award given to recognize excellence of professionals in the music and film industries. The singer was awarded the "Nihol State Prize" in 2010.
