= Galina Melnikova =

Uzbek television announcer (born 1936)

- Born: December 23, 1936 (age 89); Tashkent
- Occupation: Television Announcer
- Years active: 1956–present
- Known for: Hosting "Ahborot" and ceremonial events, People's Artist of Uzbekistan
- Notable work: Hosting information program "Ahborot," interviews with prominent figures, charitable activities

Galina Melnikova (born December 23, 1936) is an Uzbek television announcer. She has been working on television since 1956. For many years, she hosted the program "Ahborot", as well as ceremonial and festive events. She is a People's Artist of Uzbekistan.

== Biography and career ==
Galina Melnikova was born on December 23, 1936, in Tashkent. In 1961, she graduated from the Pedagogical Institute of Foreign Languages.

On December 26, 1956, at the age of 20, Melnikova made her first live appearance on the Republican Television and Radio Company. For 55 years, she worked in the staff of the television and radio company, hosted the information program "Ahborot", was the presenter of festivals, interviewed Maya Plisetskaya, then Edita Piekha, Galina Vishnevskaya, Shostakovich, Khachaturian, Genrikh Borovik, artists of the "Sovremennik" theater, film actors: Lia Akhedzhakova, Lyudmila Kasatkina, Oleg Kvasha, Oleg Yefremov.

Galina Vitalyevna was at the origins of Uzbek television, hosted many popular programs, read the most important official documents and New Year's greetings to the people from the screens of Uzbek television during the period of independence. She interviewed many Soviet figures and even met with Yuri Levitan himself.

For many years, she represented Uzbek art and literature in Moscow - she was the host of concerts with the participation of Uzbek artists in the Kremlin Palace of Congresses, in Star City. Despite repeated invitations to work in Moscow, she remained working on Uzbek television. For many years, she hosted the information program "Ahborot", now "Uzbekistan-24". Galina Melnikova was awarded the title of "Honored Artist of the Uzbek SSR" in 1975, awarded the orders "Dustlik" (1996), "Fidokorona khizmatlar uchun" (2014), the order "Friendship" (Russia, 2017), medals A. S. Pushkin (Russia), "Mehnat fakhrisiy" 1st degree (2019), honored with the national award "Oltin kalam". In 2016, she was awarded the title of "People's Artist of Uzbekistan".

Galina Melnikova has been a member of the board of trustees of "Mehrjon" since 1990 and conducts marathons of children's creativity for pupils of orphanages and boarding schools, adapts orphans to social life, developing their creative abilities. For her charitable activities, Galina Melnikova was awarded a high Christian award - the medal of the Order of St. Nicholas, Archbishop of Myra, the Wonderworker for merits in charity. The award was presented by Metropolitan of Tashkent and Central Asia Vikenty.

In 2020, a book about Melnikova was published under the title - "Galina Melnikova. A living symbol of the era". The presentation of the book took place at the National Library of Uzbekistan named after Alisher Navoi.

On the day of her eightieth birthday, December 23, 2016, Galina Melnikova was awarded the title of "People's Artist of Uzbekistan". The title was awarded by the Decree of the President of the Republic of Uzbekistan Shavkat Mirziyoyev:

On November 28, 2017, the head of Russia Vladimir Putin issued a decree on awarding the "Order of Friendship" to the People's Artist of Uzbekistan, the announcer of the national television, a member of the board of trustees of the charitable foundation "Mehrjon" Galina Melnikova. The text of the decree says that Melnikova received the award for her merits in strengthening friendship and cooperation between the peoples of Russia and Uzbekistan.
