= Tolib Sodiqov =

Uzbek composer

- Толиб Содиқов; Tolib Sodiqov
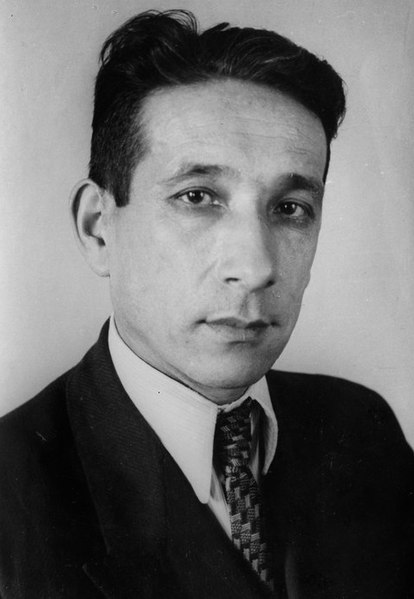
- Born: 12 March 1907; Tashkent, Syr-Darya Oblast, Russian Empire
- Died: 5 September 1957 (aged 50); Tashkent, Uzbek SSR, Soviet Union
- Occupations: Composer, conductor

Tolib Sodiqov (12 March [O.S. 27 February] 1907 – 5 September 1957) was among the founders of professional music in Uzbekistan, as well as the composer of musical dramas, quartets, operas, and romances.

Sodiqov was born in Tashkent. From 1924 to 1928, he studied at the Institute of Music and Choreography in Samarkand, where his teachers included leading Uzbek poets and composers, such as Sadriddun Ayni, Sergey Mironov and Viktor Uspensky. He then studied at the Tchaikovsky Conservatory in Moscow from 1934 to 1941, where he graduated as a composer and conductor in the class of Reinhold Glière.

His many honors included the People's Artist of the Uzbek SSR and the Stalin Prize. Sodiqov also founded the Uzbek Composers Union in 1934 and served as its director for the following 14 years.

In 1939, he wrote the first Uzbek opera, Leili and Mejnun, based on the poem by Alisher Navoi and libretto by Khurshid. The opera was given its first performance by the Alisher Navoi State Academic Bolshoi Theatre of Opera and Ballet in 1940. Among his other operas are Gulsara, Zainab and Omon. His more than 100 songs include Bul-bul (Song-bird), Bakhor (Spring), Sarvi-Gul (Flower), and Johon kurnur (I see such beauty). He also wrote the string quartet Eastern Dances, many film scores (Alisher Navoi, Yigit [Young Man], etc.) and choral works.

He died on 5 September 1957.

== Awards and honors ==
- People's Artist of the Uzbek SSR (1939)
- Stalin Prize, 3rd class (1951)
- Order of the Red Banner of Labour (6 December 1951)
- Two Orders of the Badge of Honour (31 May 1937, 16 January 1950)
- Order of Outstanding Merit (25 August 2003; posthumous)
