= Zaynab Sadriyeva =

Soviet-Uzbek actress (1941–1991)

- Born: 25 October 1914; Astrakhan, Russian Empire
- Died: 31 October 1991 (aged 77); Tashkent, Uzbekistan
- Occupation: Actress
- Years active: 1936–1991
- Awards: Order of the Red Banner of Labour; State Hamza Prize; People's Artist of Uzbekistan

Zaynab Sadriyeva (25 November 1914, Astrakhan – 31 October 1991, Tashkent) was a Soviet Uzbek theater and film actress. She was honored with the title People's Artist of the Uzbek SSR in 1952 and awarded the State Hamza Prize in 1979.

== Biography ==
She was born into a Kazan Tatar family. In 1920, her father, Sadridin, moved the family to the town of Kaunchi near Tashkent, where he started working at a sugar factory (now the city of Yangiyul). From childhood, she absorbed the Uzbek language, which became her second language and shaped her entire stage of life. She also mastered the Russian language. While studying at a pedagogical college, she performed in amateur theatrical productions. In 1929, she joined the Workers' Mobile Theater, gaining her initial theatrical experience.

From 1932 onwards, she was an actress at the Hamza Theater (now the Uzbek National Academic Drama Theater). She created vivid, significant, and sharply dramatic characters, portraying strong-willed women facing challenging destinies: Vassa Zheleznova, Kruchinina, Lyubov Yarovaya, Glafira in "The Last Sacrifice," Feklusha in "The Storm," among others. Zaynab Sadriyeva's deep temperament and emotional power gave a romantic-tragic resonance to her characters. The works of Gorky played a significant role in shaping the actress's mastery. She died on 31 October 1991.

== Selected theater roles ==
- "Intrigue and Love" Shillera, 1936
- "Poshsho-aim" («Bay i batrak» Hamza, 1939)
- "Mat" («Mat» Uygun, 1943)
- "Xaritonova" («Za tex, kto v more!» B. Lavrenyova, 1947)
- "Kseniya" («Yegor Bulichov i drugiye» M. Gorkogo),
- "Farmon-bibi" («Bunt nevestok» S. Xusanxodjayeva,1976)
- "Emiliya"(Otello,1941)

== Selected filmography ==
- 1991 — "Jelezniy mujchina"-grandmother
- 1989 — "Kamenniy idol"
- 1987 — "Uxodya, ostayutsya"-Zainab opa
- 1982 — "Suyunchi"
- 1961 — "Otvergnutaya nevesta"-grandmother Anzirat
- 1961 — "Doch Ganga"-Hemonkori
- 1953 — "Bay i batrak"-Poshshaoim, the rich's first wife

== Awards ==
- Order of the Red Banner of Labour (18 March 1959)
- State Hamza Prize (1979)
- People's Artist of the Uzbek SSR (1952)
