= Ismoil Jalilov =

Uzbek-Soviet opera singer (born 1948)

Ismoil Toʻlaganovich Jalilov
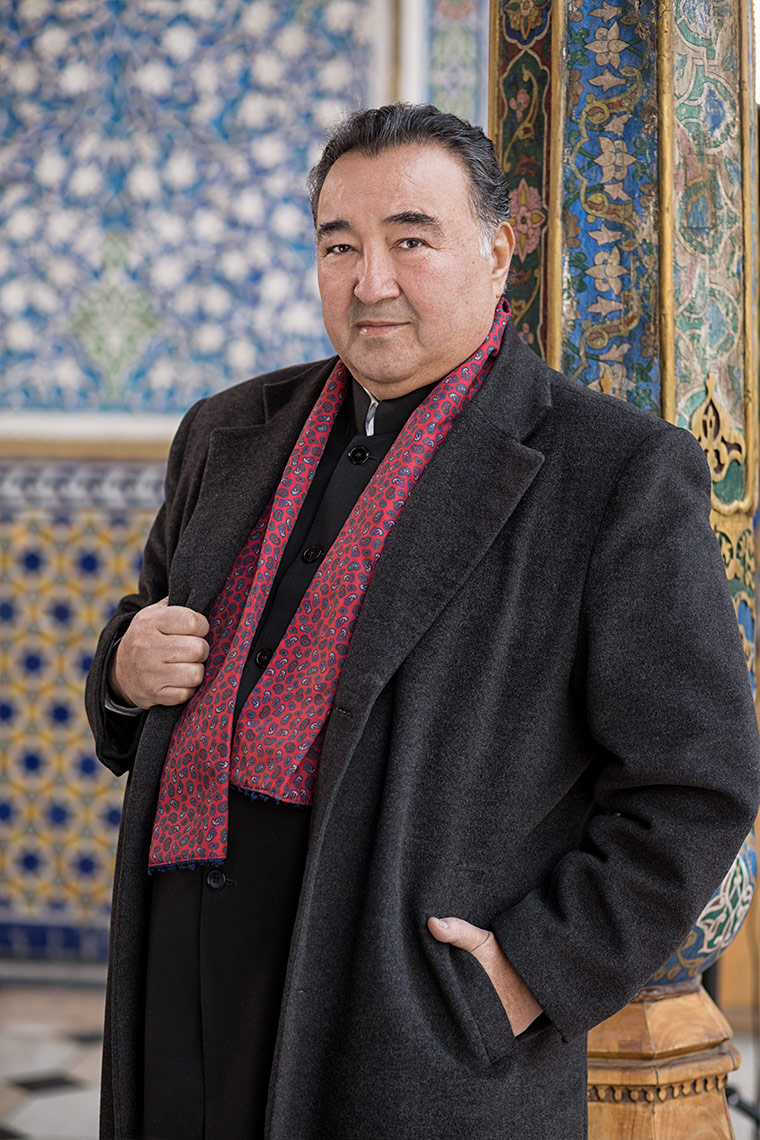
- Ismoil Jalilov
- Born: 29 January 1948 (age 78); Tashkent
- Education: Moscow Conservatory (1976)
- Occupations: Opera singer, dramatic tenor, artistic director
- Employer: National Symphony Orchestra of Uzbekistan
- Title: Honored Artist of the Uzbek SSR (1982), People's Artist of Uzbekistan (1999)
- Awards: Villa-Lobos Gold Medal (1979)

Ismoil Toʻlaganovich Jalilov (born 29 January 1948, Tashkent) is an Uzbek-Soviet opera singer and dramatic tenor. He was awarded the title of Honored Artist of the Uzbek SSR (1982) and People's Artist of Uzbekistan (1999). Jalilov's repertoire was extensive and mainly included pieces from the world classics. He was an honorary professor of the Italian Music Academy Concordia-Roma and the State Conservatory of Uzbekistan, as well as the director of the National Symphony Orchestra of Uzbekistan.

== Life ==
Ismoil Jalilov was born in a working-class family. As a child, he attended a boarding school with a focus on Russian and literature. He started singing in a vocal club at the Kirovsky Club and soon became a soloist. In 1976, Jalilov was admitted to the Moscow Conservatory and studied in the class of Professor Surab Sotkilava (People's Artist of the USSR). During his audition at the Russian State Academy of the Bolshoi Theatre, Jalilov sang the aria of Rodolfo from Giacomo Puccini's opera La bohème. Between 1979 and 1981, he performed at the Bolshoi Theatre of the USSR (Moscow).

He participated in an international vocal competition in Rio de Janeiro where he won the first place and was awarded the Villa-Lobos Gold Medal (1979). He also received the title of the second-place winner at the All-Union Competition of Singers in honor of Glinka in 1977 in Tashkent.

From 1981, he was a soloist at the Navoi Theater. He was the artistic director of the National Symphony Orchestra of Uzbekistan since 1998. In 2003, he completed his postgraduate studies at the Uzbek State Conservatory and taught as a professor of academic singing and opera.

Four of Jalilov's students are winners of the State Prize "Nikhol" established by the president of Uzbekistan, three are soloists of the Bolshoi Theatre: Alisher Navoi, Angelina Ahmedova, a fellow of the Atkins Program at the Mariinsky Theater, Barno Ismatullayeva, a finalist of the BBC Cardiff Singer of the World Competition and since 2016 a soloist at the Stanislavsky and Nemirovich-Danchenko Music Theater in Moscow.

== See also ==
Jenisbek Piyazov
