= Honored Artist of Uzbekistan =

- Oʻzbekistonda xizmat koʻrsatgan artist
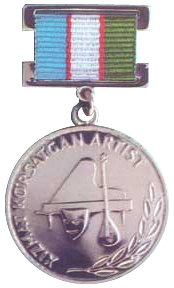
- Awarded for: Contribution to the development of art
- Date: 26 April 1996
- Country: Uzbekistan

Honored Artist of the Republic of Uzbekistan (Uzbek: Oʻzbekiston Respublikasida xizmat koʻrsatgan artist) is an honorary title given to those who contributed to the development of art in the republic. It is mainly presented to the artists of theatre, film, pop music, circus, TV and radio broadcast, film directors, musicians, singers, ballet masters, the conductors of orchestra and choir, the representatives of music or other artistic teams.

== Description ==
- The badge is 30 mm in diameter and is made of 925 sterling silver. The thickness of the badge is 2.2 millimeters.
- A dombra, mask and grand piano are depicted on the framed flat face of the badge, with a laurel branch in the lower right corner. Around the circle of the badge, the inscription "HONORED ARTIST" is written.
- The national coat of arms of the Republic of Uzbekistan is depicted on the back of the badge. Images and text are bubble.
- A silk ribbon in the colors of the National flag of the Republic of Uzbekistan is attached to the inside of the badge with a loop.
