= List of recipients of the State Hamza Prize =

This is a list of the recipients of the State Hamza Prize.

Year	Recipient	For
1964	Oybek	for the novella Bolalik (Russian: Детство)
1964	Shukur Burkhanov	for portraying Ulugh Beg in the theatrical production Mirzo Ulugʻbek
1964	Malik Qayumov	for the documentary film Ot vesny do vesny (Russian: От весны до весны)
1964	Dmitry Ryabichev	for the sculpture Fourteen Turkestan Commissars in Tashkent (taken down in 1996)
1964	Nikolay Milovidov	for the sculpture Fourteen Turkestan Commissars in Tashkent (taken down in 1996)
1964	Sergey Ozhegov	for the sculpture Fourteen Turkestan Commissars in Tashkent (taken down in 1996)
1966	Abdulla Qahhor	for the novella Oʻtmishdan ertaklar (Russian: Сказки о былом)
1966	Rashid Hamroyev	for the opera Zulmatdan ziyo (Russian: Свет из мрака)
1966	Galina Pugachenkova	for the book Oʻzbekiston sanʼati tarixi (Russian: История искусств Узбекистана с древнейших времен до XIX в.)
1966	Lazar Rempel	for the book Oʻzbekiston sanʼati tarixi (Russian: История искусств Узбекистана с древнейших времен до XIX в.)
1966	Vladimir Berezin	for designing the Palace of Arts and the administrative building of the Central Committee of the Communist party of Uzbekistan in Tashkent
1966	Aleksandr Faynleyb	for designing the Palace of Arts and the administrative building of the Central Committee of the Communist party of Uzbekistan in Tashkent
1966	Sergo Sutyagin	for designing the Palace of Arts and the administrative building of the Central Committee of the Communist party of Uzbekistan in Tashkent
1966	Dmitry Shuvaev	for designing the Palace of Arts and the administrative building of the Central Committee of the Communist party of Uzbekistan in Tashkent
1966	S. Eshonxo‘jaev	for designing the Palace of Arts and the administrative building of the Central Committee of the Communist party of Uzbekistan in Tashkent
1966	Yuri Khaldeev	for designing the Palace of Arts and the administrative building of the Central Committee of the Communist party of Uzbekistan in Tashkent
1966	Aleksei Asanov	for designing the Palace of Arts and the administrative building of the Central Committee of the Communist party of Uzbekistan in Tashkent
1966	David Antman	for designing the Palace of Arts and the administrative building of the Central Committee of the Communist party of Uzbekistan in Tashkent
1966	Aleksandr Braslavsky	for designing the Palace of Arts and the administrative building of the Central Committee of the Communist party of Uzbekistan in Tashkent
1966	Evald Lenneshmidt	for designing the Palace of Arts and the administrative building of the Central Committee of the Communist party of Uzbekistan in Tashkent
1967	Uygʻun	for three-volumed selected works and the poetry collections Hayot chorlaydi and Qalbimda bahor
1967	Komil Yashin	for the plays Yoʻlchi Yulduz and Nurxon
1967	Rahim Ahmedov	for a series of portraits depicting contemporaries
1967	Olim Xoʻjayev	for the production of King Lear at the Uzbek State Academic Drama Theater
1967	Sora Eshontoʻrayeva	for the production of King Lear at the Uzbek State Academic Drama Theater
1967	Nabi Rahimov	for the production of King Lear at the Uzbek State Academic Drama Theater
1967	Yayra Abdullayeva	for the production of King Lear at the Uzbek State Academic Drama Theater
1967	Saʼdixon Tabibullayev	for the production of King Lear at the Uzbek State Academic Drama Theater
1967	Nikolai Ladigin	for the production of King Lear at the Uzbek State Academic Drama Theater
1967	Komil Yormatov	for the film Osiyo ustida boʻron (Russian: Буря над Азией)
1967	Mukarram Turgunbaeva	for choreographing dance sequences for the Bahor state dance troupe on occasion of the 50th anniversary of the October Revolution
1968	Sergey Borodin	for the novel Samarqand osmonida yulduzlar (Russian: Звезды над Самаркандом)
1968	Nozir Safarov	for the novella Koʻrgan-kechirganlarim (Russian: О прожитом и пережитом) and collection of literary sketches Bir tomchi qon (Russian: Капля крови)
1968	Chingiz Akhmarov	for large paintings and murals of Ali-Shir Nava'i
1968	Halima Nosirova	for her performance of Uzbek traditional songs during Uzbek culture weeks in neighboring countries as well as her performance of songs set to Navai's poems
1970	Zulfiya	for the poetry collections Oʻylar and Shalola
1970	Quddus Muhammadiy	for the children's poetry collection Qanotli doʻstlar
1970	Sobir Muhamedov	for the film Oʻtgan kunlar
1970	Yoʻldosh Aʼzamov	for the film Oʻtgan kunlar
1970	Abbos Bakirov	for the film Oʻtgan kunlar
1970	Razzoq Hamroyev	for the film Oʻtgan kunlar
1970	Hamza Umarov	for the film Oʻtgan kunlar
1970	Mikhail Krasnyansky	for the film Oʻtgan kunlar
1970	Toshxoʻja Xoʻjayev	for the production of Oltinchi iyul at the Uzbek State Academic Drama Theater
1970	Mukhtar Ashrafi	for the production of the ballet Sevgi tumori at the Alisher Navoi State Academic Grand Theatre
1970	Galiya Izmaylova	for the production of the ballet Sevgi tumori at the Alisher Navoi State Academic Grand Theatre
1970	Meli Musayev	for the production of the ballet Sevgi tumori at the Alisher Navoi State Academic Grand Theatre
1970	Bernara Karieva	for the production of the ballet Sevgi tumori at the Alisher Navoi State Academic Grand Theatre
1970	Klara Yusupova	for the production of the ballet Sevgi tumori at the Alisher Navoi State Academic Grand Theatre
1970	Vitaly Vasilev	for the production of the ballet Sevgi tumori at the Alisher Navoi State Academic Grand Theatre
1970	Mutal Burhonov	for the symphonic poem Alisher Navoiyga qasida (set to an Abdulla Oripov poem) and the romance Qalb ovozi (set to a Turob Toʻla poem)
1970	Leon Adamov	for designing the layout of Lenin Avenue in Tashkent
1970	Vil Muratov (Note: Newspapers of the time, including Sovet Oʻzbekistoni, spelled his name as V. D. Muratov. His full name, including the patronymic, is Muratov Vil Aslemovich (spelled Asliamovich in some sources). Thus, his shortened named is V. A. Muratov, as reported correctly in later books.)	for designing the layout of Lenin Avenue in Tashkent
1970	V. S. Grishin	for designing the layout of Lenin Avenue in Tashkent
1970	Yevgeny Rozanov	for the design of the Tashkent branch of the Lenin Museum
1970	Vsevolod Shestopalov	for the design of the Tashkent branch of the Lenin Museum
1970	Vladimir Krichevsky	for the design of the Tashkent branch of the Lenin Museum
1970	Igor Lentochnikov	for the design of the Tashkent branch of the Lenin Museum
1970	Yuri Boldychev	for the design of the Tashkent branch of the Lenin Museum
1970	Aleksandr Rochegov	for the design of the Ts-1 and Ts-2 residential areas in Tashkent
1970	Vladimir Steyskal	for the design of the Ts-1 and Ts-2 residential areas in Tashkent
1970	Vladimir Ginzburg	for the design of the Ts-1 and Ts-2 residential areas in Tashkent
1970	Yuli Raninsky	for the design of the Ts-1 and Ts-2 residential areas in Tashkent
1970	Mikhail Firsov	for the design of the Ts-1 and Ts-2 residential areas in Tashkent
1970	Viktor Khandzhi	for the design of the Ts-1 and Ts-2 residential areas in Tashkent
1970	Roman Feygelman (Note: Full name: Roman Semyonovich Feygelman. His initials, usually written as "R. S. Feygelman,", were incorrectly given as "V. R. Feygelman" in Sovet Oʻzbekistoni.)	for the design of the Ts-1 and Ts-2 residential areas in Tashkent
1970	Mahmud Usmonov	for the interior decorations of the Tashkent branch of the Lenin Museum
1970	Qodirjon Haydarov	for the interior decorations of the Tashkent branch of the Lenin Museum
1971	Sobir Abdulla	for the poetry collection Devon
1971	Tolepbergen Qayibergenov	for the children's novella Rahmat, muallim
1971	Odelsha Agishev	for writing the script of the film Favqulodda komissar (Russian: Чрезвычайный комиссар)
1971	Ali Hamroyev	for directing the film Favqulodda komissar
1971	Hotam Fayziyev	for shooting Favqulodda komissar
1971	Emonuel Kalantarov	for designing the production set of Favqulodda komissar
1971	Yunus Rajabiy	for the six-volume vinyl set Shoshmaqom
1971	Galina Zagurskaya	for portraying the character of the mother in the production of Chingiz Aitmatov's Momo yer (Russian: Материнское поле) at the Gorky Russian Drama Theatre
1973	Asqad Muxtor	for the novel Chinor
1973	Aleksey Kozlovsky	for composing the ballet Tanovar
1973	Nikolai Markaryants	for choreographing Tanovar
1973	Dilbar Abdurahmonova	for conducting Tanovar
1973	Ural Tansykbayev	for the paintings Jonajon Oʻzbekiston, Kuz tongi, 1971-yil oqshomida, and Mening qoʻshigʻim
1973	Vohid Zohidov	for the collection of articles Donolar davrasida
1973	Georgy Vladimirov	for the collection of articles Buyuk birlik (Russian: Великое единство: Сборник)
1973	Laziz Qayumov	for the monograph Hamza and the collection of articles Zamondoshlar
1974	Hamid Gʻulom	for the novel Toshkentliklar
1974	Mirmuhsin	for the novel Umid
1974	Shuhrat Abbosov	for directing the films You are Not an Orphan (Uzbek: Sen yetim emassan; Russian: Ты не сирота) and Abu Rayhon Beruniy (Russian: Абу Райхан Беруни)
1974	Bayram Matjonov	for their contributions to the development of musical arts in Karakalpakstan
1974	Otajon Xudoyshukurov	for their contributions to the development of musical arts in Karakalpakstan
1974	Najimaddin Muhammaddinov	for their contributions to the development of musical arts in Karakalpakstan
1974	Poʻlat Madreimov	for their contributions to the development of musical arts in Karakalpakstan
1974	Bayramgeldi Murodov	for their contributions to the development of musical arts in Karakalpakstan
1974	Gulparshin Srimbetova	for their contributions to the development of musical arts in Karakalpakstan
1974	Obid Zaynutdinov	for the project to restore the Registan
1974	Konstantin Kryukov	for the project to restore the Registan
1974	Mirumar Asadov	for research, design, and restoration work on the project to restore the Registan
1974	Anvar Quliyev	for research, design, and restoration work on the project to restore the Registan
1974	Toshmuqum Qurbonov	for research, design, and restoration work on the project to restore the Registan
1977	Said Ahmad	for the trilogy Ufq
1977	Odil Yoqubov	for the novel Ulugʻbek xazinasi
1977	Hafiz Abdusamatov	for the monographs Traditsiya va novatorlik problemasi (Russian: Проблемы традиций и новаторства) and Estetika va hayot (Russian: Эстетика и жизнь)
1977	Matyoqub Qoʻshjonov	for the monographs Talant qirralari (Russian: Грани таланта) and Maʼno va meʼzon (Russian: Содержательность и своеобразие)
1977	Salohiddin Mamajonov	for the monographs Shoir dunyosi (Russian: Мир поэта) and Ulugʻ Vatan urushi davrida oʻzbek adabiyoti (Russian: Узбекская литература периода Великий Отечественной войны)
1977	Valentin Klevantsov	for the statue of Al-Biruni in the town of Beruniy
1977	Ruvim Nemirosvky	for the statue of Al-Biruni in the town of Beruniy
1977	Karim Molutov	for the statue of Al-Biruni in the town of Beruniy
1977	Abdulhaq Abdullayev	for a series of portraits of contemporaries
1977	Muhiddin Rahimov	for his ceramic artworks
1977	Fazilat Saydaliyeva	for embroidered portraits of Vladimir Lenin
1977	Zohid Sobitov	for directing the film Ikki jangchi haqida qissa (Russian: Повесть о двух солдатах)
1977	Oʻlmas Umarbekov	for writing the script of Ikki jangchi haqida qissa
1977	Nikolai Figurovsky	for writing the script of Ikki jangchi haqida qissa
1977	Leonid Travitsky	for shooting Ikki jangchi haqida qissa
1977	Valentin Sinchenko	for designing the production set of Ikki jangchi haqida qissa (awarded posthumously)
1977	Gʻani Rasulov	for producing the documentary film From Congress to Congress: Soviet Uzbekistan (Russian: От съезда к съезду. Советский Узбекистан)
1977	Hojimurod Ibrohimov	for directing From Congress to Congress: Soviet Uzbekistan
1977	Kim Gym Nian	for shooting From Congress to Congress: Soviet Uzbekistan
1977	Mirsobit Salimov	for shooting From Congress to Congress: Soviet Uzbekistan
1977	Turdi Nodirov	for shooting From Congress to Congress: Soviet Uzbekistan
1977	Qahramon Hasanov	for shooting From Congress to Congress: Soviet Uzbekistan
1977	Ikrom Akbarov	for the choral symphony Hamsa set to Ali-Shir Nava'i's poems and the symphony Samarqand
1977	Solomon Yudakov	for the cantata Muborakbod set to a Hamid Gʻulom poem and the choral symphony Alyor
1977	Isahar Akilov	for choreographing the dances Buxoro yulduzi, Dil kuylasin, Uzum terimi (Russian: Сбор винограда), Eron (Russian: Иранский), Tojik (Russian: Таджикский) and Xorazm (Russian: Хорезмский)
1977	Ilya Merport	for the blueprint of Hotel Uzbekistan in Tashkent
1977	Lyudmila Ershova	for the blueprint of Hotel Uzbekistan in Tashkent
1977	Lev Gorlitsky	for the blueprint of Hotel Uzbekistan in Tashkent
1977	Saydulla Ortiqov	for the blueprint of Hotel Uzbekistan in Tashkent
1977	Pyotr Kavtarov	for the blueprint of Hotel Uzbekistan in Tashkent
1977	Vladimir Minakov	for the blueprint of Hotel Uzbekistan in Tashkent
1977	Nikolai Saninkov	for the blueprint of Hotel Uzbekistan in Tashkent
1977	Botir Usmonov	for the blueprint of the Uzbekistan Health Resort in Sochi, Russia
1977	Dilshod Latipov	for the blueprint of the Uzbekistan Health Resort in Sochi, Russia
1977	Igor Yaroshevsky	for the blueprint of the Uzbekistan Health Resort in Sochi, Russia
1977	Anatoly Zhuzhukin	for the blueprint of the Uzbekistan Health Resort in Sochi, Russia
1977	Ilya Sonn	for the blueprint of the Uzbekistan Health Resort in Sochi, Russia
1977	Ofeliia Aidinova	for the architecture and design of the Bukhara Hotel in Bukhara (nowadays called Grand Bukhara Hotel)
1977	Einulla Alieva	for the architecture and design of the Bukhara Hotel in Bukhara (nowadays called Grand Bukhara Hotel)
1977	Nodar Bandzeladze	for the architecture and design of the Bukhara Hotel in Bukhara (nowadays called Grand Bukhara Hotel)
1977	Vasily Degtiarev	for the architecture and design of the Bukhara Hotel in Bukhara (nowadays called Grand Bukhara Hotel)
1977	Anzor Dzhishiashvili	for the architecture and design of the Bukhara Hotel in Bukhara (nowadays called Grand Bukhara Hotel)
1977	Sofya Rakova	for the architecture and design of the Bukhara Hotel in Bukhara (nowadays called Grand Bukhara Hotel)
1977	Nikolai Praschenko	for the architecture and design of the Bukhara Hotel in Bukhara (nowadays called Grand Bukhara Hotel)
1977	Nozir Rajabov	for the architecture and design of the Bukhara Hotel in Bukhara (nowadays called Grand Bukhara Hotel)
1977	Qodir Ochilov	for the architecture and design of the Bukhara Hotel in Bukhara (nowadays called Grand Bukhara Hotel)
1979	Mirtemir	for the poetry collections Togʻday tayanchim and Yodgorlik (awarded posthumously)
1979	Qutlugʻ Basharov	for his easel paintings and book illustrations
1979	Neʼmat Qoʻziboyev	for his paintings and portraits
1979	Uchqun Nazarov	for directing the three-part film Qoʻqon voqeasi (Russian: Это было в Коканде)
1979	Abdurahim Ismoilov	for shooting Qoʻqon voqeasi
1979	Sadriddin Ziyamuhamedov	for designing the production set of Qoʻqon voqeasi
1979	Sayfi Jalilov	for the symphony Samarqandnoma and a series of concertos for the cello and orchestra
1979	Manas Leviyev (Note: Spelled as "Minasay Leviyev" in Sovet Oʻzbekistoni.)	for the music of the production of Toshkent goʻzali at the Muqimiy Theatre and Qizil durrachali sarvqomat dilbarim (based on a Chinghiz Aitmatov novella) at the Andijan Theatre
1979	Ikroma Boltayeva	for portraying mothers in stage productions at the Hamza Theatre from 1977 to 1979
1979	Zaynab Sadriyeva	for portraying mothers in stage productions at the Hamza Theatre from 1977 to 1979
1979	Toshxon Sultonova	for portraying mothers in stage productions at the Hamza Theatre from 1977 to 1979
1979	Samira Hidoyatova	for portraying mothers in stage productions at the Hamza Theatre from 1977 to 1979
1979	Xolida Xoʻjayeva	for portraying mothers in stage productions at the Hamza Theatre from 1977 to 1979
1981	Abdulla Oripov	for the poetry collection Najot qalʼasi and the poem Hakim va ajal
1981	Hakim Nazir	for the five-volume collection of his works
1981	Pirimqul Qodirov	for the novel Babur: Starry Nights (Uzbek: Yulduzli tunlar)
1981	Yuri Surovtsev	for translating Babur: Starry Nights into Russian
1981	Asil Rashidov	for the monograph Oʻzbek qissalarida mehnat tasviri
1981	Faruk Kagarov	for a series of political art pieces
1981	Mikhail Stepaniants	for the panoramic painting Lenin with Us and artwork in Qashqadaryo Region
1981	Hakimxoʻja Husniddinxoʻjayev	for the statue of Avicenna in Afshona Village in Bukhara Region
1981	Rafail Toʻxtaganov	for the statue of Avicenna in Afshona Village in Bukhara Region
1981	Latif Fayziyev	for producing the film Vatanga xizmat qilaman (Russian: Служа Отечеству)
1981	Artur Makarov	for writing the screenplay of Vatanga xizmat qilaman
1981	Firudin Safarov	for directing the production of Andrei Petrov's opera Peter the Great at the Alisher Navoi State Academic Grand Theatre
1981	VIacheslav Grinchenko	for portraying Peter the Great in the production of the eponymous opera at the Alisher Navoi State Academic Grand Theatre
1981	Laut Rozalinda	for portraying Sophia in the production of Peter the Great at the Alisher Navoi State Academic Grand Theatre
1981	Qoʻrqmas Muhiddinov	for portraying Macarius in the production of Peter the Great at the Alisher Navoi State Academic Grand Theatre
1981	Akrom Xudoyqulov	for restoration work on the Registan
1981	Iosif Pinkhasov	for restoration work on the Registan
1981	Yakov Aradovsky	for restoration work on the Registan
1981	Aleksandr Stupin	for restoration work on the Registan
1981	Shamsi Sayfiyev	for restoration work on the Registan
1983	Erkin Vohidov	for the poetry collection Sharqiy qirgʻoq
1983	Ibrohim Rahimov	for the novel Oqibat
1983	Aleksandr Udalov	for the novel Vatan farzandi (Russian: Родина-Родина)
1983	Vladimir Derzhavin	for Qadimgi yoʻl (Russian: Древний путь), a translated volume of classic Uzbek (i.e. Turkic) poems into Russian
1983	Roʻzi Choriyev	for portraits of contemporaries
1983	Anatoly Kabulov	for directing the film Oʻjar qiz (Russian: Непокорная)
1983	Grigory Marianovsky	for writing the script of Oʻjar qiz
1983	Davron Abdullayev	for shooting Oʻjar qiz
1983	Damir Salimov	for directing the film Leningradliklar, jigarbandlarim (Russian: Ленинградцы, дети мои…)
1983	Temur Qayumov	for shooting Leningradliklar, jigarbandlarim
1983	Evgeny Pushin (Note: Spelled "Pushchin" in Sovet Oʻzbekistoni.)	for designing the production sets of Oʻjar qiz and Leningradliklar, jigarbandlarim
1983	Rumil Vildanov	for composing music for Leningradliklar, jigarbandlarim and Oʻjar qiz
1983	Tamara Shakirova	for portraying Xadicha in Leningradliklar, jigarbandlarim and Jumagul in Oʻjar qiz
1983	Suluv Ollamuratova	for portraying Gulbeka in Oʻjar qiz
1983	Ulugʻbek Musayev	for the production of the ballet Hind dostoni (Russian: Индийская поэма) at the Bolshoi Theatre in Moscow
1983	Yury Grigorovich	for the production of the ballet Hind dostoni (Russian: Индийская поэма) at the Bolshoi Theatre in Moscow
1983	Yury Papko	for the production of the ballet Hind dostoni (Russian: Индийская поэма) at the Bolshoi Theatre in Moscow
1983	Yumaley Skott	for the production of the ballet Hind dostoni (Russian: Индийская поэма) at the Bolshoi Theatre in Moscow
1983	Aleksandr Kopylov	for the production of the ballet Hind dostoni (Russian: Индийская поэма) at the Bolshoi Theatre in Moscow
1983	Nikolay Zolotaryov	for the production of the ballet Hind dostoni (Russian: Индийская поэма) at the Bolshoi Theatre in Moscow
1983	Alla Mikhalʹchenko	for the production of the ballet Hind dostoni (Russian: Индийская поэма) at the Bolshoi Theatre in Moscow
1983	Alexei Lazerev	for the production of the ballet Hind dostoni (Russian: Индийская поэма) at the Bolshoi Theatre in Moscow
1983	Boris Petrov	for the sports show at Pakhtakor Stadium to celebrate the 2000th anniversary of Tashkent City
1983	Abdurashid Rahimov	for the sports show at Pakhtakor Stadium to celebrate the 2000th anniversary of Tashkent City
1983	Islom Ismoilov	for the sports show at Pakhtakor Stadium to celebrate the 2000th anniversary of Tashkent City
1983	Dmitry Genkin	for the sports show at Pakhtakor Stadium to celebrate the 2000th anniversary of Tashkent City
1983	Lev Nemchik (Note: Spelled "Nenchik" in Sovet Oʻzbekistoni.)	for the sports show at Pakhtakor Stadium to celebrate the 2000th anniversary of Tashkent City
1983	Mamajon Rahmonov	for the monograph Qadimiy davrlardan 1917 yilgacha oʻzbek teatri
1983	Roziya Karimova	for the monograph Bahor ansambli raqslari
1983	Feruz Ashrafi	for the architecture and design of the Aviation Workers Palace in Tashkent
1983	Anatoly Onishchenko	for the architecture and design of the Aviation Workers Palace in Tashkent
1983	Rahim Nasriddinov	for the architecture and design of the Aviation Workers Palace in Tashkent
1983	Muhammad Vohidov	for the architecture and design of the Aviation Workers Palace in Tashkent
1983	Viktor Kolyberdin	for the architecture and design of the Aviation Workers Palace in Tashkent
1983	Abdulla Yusupov	for the architecture and design of the Aviation Workers Palace in Tashkent
1983	Viktor Mikhailov	for the architecture and design of the Aviation Workers Palace in Tashkent
1983	Hojimurod Kalagov	for the architecture and design of the Aviation Workers Palace in Tashkent
1983	Robert Avakian	for the architecture and design of the Aviation Workers Palace in Tashkent
1983	Albert Ovsepian	for the architecture and design of the Aviation Workers Palace in Tashkent
1986	Temur Poʻlatov	for the novel Buxoro xonadonining kechmishlari and the novellas Gʻoyibning ikkinchi sayohati, Mulk, and Kunda-shunda
1986	Oʻtkir Hoshimov	for the novel Ikki eshik orasi
1986	Marat Fayziev	for the graphic artworks Xronika and Mirzachoʻlning oʻzlashtirilishi
1986	Tilab Mahmudov	for the book Oʻzbekiston rang tasvir estetikasi and the monograph Abdulhaq Abdullayev
1986	Elyor Eshmuhamedov	for directing and writing the script of the film Alvido, goʻr yoshligim...
1986	Jasur Ishoqov	for writing the script of Alvido, goʻr yoshligim...
1986	Yuri Lyubshin	for shooting Alvido, goʻr yoshligim...
1986	Igor Gulenko	for designing the production set of Alvido, goʻr yoshligim...
1986	Ravil Batyrov (Note: Spelled "Roald Botirov" in Sovet Oʻzbekistoni.)	for directing the war films 41-yil olmalari (Russian: Яблоки сорок первого года), 26-oltilmasin (Russian: В 26-го не стрелять!), Unutilmagan qoʻshiq (Russian: Незабытая песня, Leytenant Nekrasovning aybi (Russian: Вина лейтенанта Некрасова)
1986	Rustam Abdullayev	for composing the music for the ballet Quyoshga taʼzim
1986	Yaroslavl Afanasyev	for the Harbiy Yodgorlik memorial complex in Tashkent
1986	Leonid Ryabtsev	for the Harbiy Yodgorlik memorial complex in Tashkent
1986	Vladimir Lunev	for the Harbiy Yodgorlik memorial complex in Tashkent
1986	Anvar Rahmatullayev	for the Harbiy Yodgorlik memorial complex in Tashkent
1986	Naum Zisman	for the Harbiy Yodgorlik memorial complex in Tashkent
1986	Shamsiddin Islomov	for the Harbiy Yodgorlik memorial complex in Tashkent
1989	Omon Matjon	for the poetry collection Gaplashadigan vaqtlar
1989	Xudoyberdi Toʻxtaboyev	for the novel Shirin qovunlar mamlakati
1989	Umarali Normatov	for the book Qalb inqilobi
1989	Norboy Xudoyberganov	for the book Oʻz dunyosi, oʻz qiyofasi
1989	Ibrohim Gʻafurov	for the book Oʻttiz yil izhori
1989	Shomahmud Muhammadjonov	for series of works reviving traditional book design and miniatures
1989	Yigitali Tursunnazarov	for the series of paintings Uygʻonish, Veteran-chekistlarning oqshom suhbati, Inson va sayyora, Sokinlik, and Orol koʻz yoshlari
1989	Turgʻun Poʻlat	for the novella Ichkuyov written in 1975 and adapted to film later (posthumously)
1989	Maqsud Yunusov	for directing the four-part television film Ichkuyov
1989	Toʻlqin Qurbonov	for shooting Ichkuyov
1989	Yodgor Sa’diyev	for playing the main role in Ichkuyov
1989	Rustam Hamidov	for directing the production of Qutlugʻ qon at the Hamza Theatre and the Peoples' Friendship Palace
1989	Gʻani A’zamov	for playing the main roles in Qutlugʻ qon
1989	Gavhar Zokirova	for playing the main roles in Qutlugʻ qon
1989	Tolibjon Karimov	for playing the main roles in Qutlugʻ qon
1989	Baxtiyor Qosimov	for playing the main roles in Qutlugʻ qon
1989	Tesha Moʻminov	for playing the main roles in Qutlugʻ qon
1989	Zikir Muhammadjonov	for playing the main roles in Qutlugʻ qon
1989	Oydin Norboyeva	for playing the main roles in Qutlugʻ qon
1989	Shukur Xolmirzayev	for the play Qora kamar (Note: Misspelled "Qora kampir" in Sovet Oʻzbekistoni.)
1989	Bahodir Yoʻdoshev	for directing the production of Qora kamar at the Yosh Gvardiya Theatre
1989	Georgy Brim	for designing the production set of Qora kamar
1989	Farhod Aminov	for playing the main roles in Qora kamar
1989	Mirhosil Oripov	for playing the main roles in Qora kamar
1989	Obidjon Yunusov	for playing the main roles in Qora kamar
1989	Farrukh Zokirov	for his work as the lead singer of Yalla
1989	Abbos Aliyev	for their work as members of Yalla
1989	Javlon Toʻxtayev	for their work as members of Yalla
1989	Alisher Toʻlaganov	for their work as members of Yalla
1989	Rustam Ilyosov	for their work as members of Yalla
1989	Alla Kozhenkova	for designing stage outfits for members of Yalla
1989	Toʻlqinoy Qodirova	for the monograph Sovet Oʻzbekistoni arxitekturasi
1990	Murod Muhammad Doʻst	for the novel Lolazor
1990	Nosir Fozilov	for the book Ustozlar davrasida
1990	Halima Xudoyberdiyeva	for the poetry collection Muqaddas ayol
1990	Akram Ikromjonov	for the paintings Ona yer ohanglari, Chaqmoq, Sukunat and the triptych Orol—mening dardim
1990	Sharof Boshbekov	for the production of the play Temir xotin at the Maxim Gorky Theatre in Fergana Region
1990	Olimjon Salimov	for the production of the play Temir xotin at the Maxim Gorky Theatre in Fergana Region
1990	Viktor Mikhaylichenko	for the production of the play Temir xotin at the Maxim Gorky Theatre in Fergana Region
1990	Oykaram Halimova	for the production of the play Temir xotin at the Maxim Gorky Theatre in Fergana Region
1990	Muhammadsoli Yusupov	for the production of the play Temir xotin at the Maxim Gorky Theatre in Fergana Region
1990	Matniyoz Yusupov	for the volumes Xorazm maqomlari and Oʻzbek xalq muzikasi
1990	Mirzohid Ashirov	for the carving art Peshayvon
1990	Adham Ashirov	for the carving art Peshayvon
