= Fiery Roads =

- Genre: Drama
- Written by: Kamil Yashin; Boris Privalov; Shuhrat Abbosov
- Directed by: Shuhrat Abbosov
- Composer: Rumil Vildanov
- Country of origin: Soviet Union
- Original language: Russian
- No. of seasons: 5
- No. of episodes: 17

Production
- Production company: Uzbekfilm

Original release
- Release: 1977 – 1984

Fiery Roads (Russian: Огненные дороги, Uzbek: Olovli yoʻllar) was an Uzbek television series running from 1977 to 1984 based on the life of Uzbek enlightener Hamza Hakimzade Niyazi.

== Plot ==
The series was closely based on the novel "Hamza" by Kamil Yashin, who was also the screenwriter, as well as the storybook "Furious Hamza" (Russian: Неистовый Хамза) by Lyubov Voronkova. It depicts Hamza's struggles to promote the revolution and modernization against a background of feudalism and Basmachi terror.

== Episodes ==
- 1978: Season 1 "Heart of a Poet", episodes 1-4
- 1979: Season 2 "In Search of Truth", episodes 5-8
- 1982: Season 3: "Singer of the Revolution", episodes 9-12
- 1983: Season 4: "Fighting Turkestan" episodes 13-14
- 1984: Season 5: "My Republic" episodes 15-17

== Cast (partial list) ==
The diverse crew of the production consisted of various high-profile actors and actresses from across the Soviet Union, featuring cast members from Uzbek, Tajik, Russian, Kartvelian, Tatar, Ossetian, and other backgrounds.

- Oʻlmas Alixoʻjayev as Hamza
- Nabi Rahimov as Ibn Yamin
- Poʻlat Saidqosimov as Zavqiy
- Yoqub Ahmedov as Sheikh Ismail-Kohja
- Abdulhayr Qosimov as Ahmadbai
- Dilorom Qambarova as Zubeida
- Tamara Shakirova as Yulduzkhon
- Bahodir Yoʻldoshev as Alchinbek
- Bimbolat Batayev as Sadykjan Salikhbayev
- Razzoq Hamroyev as Sheikh Khazrat
- Javlon Hamroyev as Matkaul
- Igor Dmitriev as Viktor Medynsky
- Danuta Stolarska as Mariya Medynskaya
- Yuri Dubrovin as Nikolai Grigorievich
- Yuri Gusev as Stepan Sokolov
- Sergey Yakovlev as Russian doctor
- Shavkat Abdusalomov as Umid Abdusalamov
- Murod Rajabov as Gafur
- Timofey Spivak as Richardson
- Botir Zokirov as Rabindranath Tagore
- Shuhrat Ergashev as editor of "Kingash" magazine
- Vsevolod Safonov as Comrade Andrey
- Nikolai Barmin as N. Barshin
- Otar Koberidze as Dundar
- Tamara Yandiyeva as Rabia
- Viktor Saitov as Mikhail Frunze
- Lev Prygunov as Dmitry Furmanov
- Rasim Balayev as Emir of Bukhara
- Natalya Varley as Mariya Kuznetsova
- Sanʼat Devonov as Fayzulla Xoʻjayev
- Genrikh Ostashevsky as Anton Petrovich
- Gʻani Aʼzamov as a mullah
- Zikir Muhammadjonov as Shavkat
