= Toʻxtasin Jalilov =

Soviet Uzbek composer (1895–1966)

- Тўхтасин Жалилов; Toʻxtasin Jalilov
- Born: c. 1895 (Note: Sources vary as to when he was born. His obituary in Sovet Oʻzbekistoni states he was born in 1894; OʻzME indicates he was born on 13 December 1895; and various other sources say he was born in 1896.); Andijon, Russian Turkestan, Russian Empire
- Died: 11 May 1966; Tashkent, Uzbek SSR, USSR
- Occupation: composer

Toʻxtasin Jalilov (Uzbek: Toʻxtasin Jalilov, Тўхтасин Жалилов; Russian: Тохтасын Джалилов, romanized Tokhtasyn Dzhalilov; c. 1895 — 11 May 1966) was an Uzbek composer and musician. One of the founders of the Uzbek drama musical genre and an early contributor to Uzbek opera, he received many prestigious awards for his work, including the title People's Artist of the Uzbek SSR, the Order of Lenin, and Order of Outstanding Merit.

== Life and career ==
Toʻxtasin Jalilov was born c. 1895 in Andijon. He came from an impoverished peasant family. His father was a farmworker, and due to extreme poverty, he sold Toʻxtasin to a baker to work in his bakery, who then resold him. Despite his young age, Jalilov was forced to work all day while being badly abused and given very little food to eat. A lover of music, in the very little time he had to spare he played music and sang, gaining a reputation for his good singing voice. After the October Revolution he started building his music career. He took lessons from famous musicians in the region, but never graduated from any formal music school.

In the late 1910s, in the midst of the Basmachi movement, Jalilov helped Hamza Hakimzade Niyazi form a mobile musical ensemble, which travelled on a car decorated with red banners. He personally helped found the Andijan Theater and the Uzbek State Philharmonic, where he worked for many years. He then worked at the Muqimiy Theater from 1940 until his death in 1966.

As his career took off in the 1920s and 30s, he worked with many different musical groups, including the National Music Circle, Uzbek Ethnographic Troupe, Andijan Musical Drama Theater, the Uzbek State Musical Theater in Tashkent named after Ya. M. Sverdlov, and the Uzbek State Philharmonic. He also worked with many celebrated musical artists. In 1935, Jalilov participated in an international music festival in London with other famous artists of the Uzbek SSR including Usta Olim Komilov and Tamara Khanum.

Jalilov died on 11 May 1966 in Tashkent. His children followed in his footsteps and also worked in the theater industry.

== Works ==
Jalilov composed the music for classic Uzbek plays, operas, and songs based on the works of Soviet poets. He mastered many different instruments including the tanbur, dutar, ghijak, and dulcimer. He composed the opera Tohir and Zukra, working with Boris Brovtsyn, and created melodies, albeit without using sheet music.

Among the musical dramas he collaborated in composing music for were Oʻzbekiston qilichi along with Nabijon Hasanov, Muqimiy by Sobir Abdulla, Ravshan and Zulhumor by Komil Yashin, Alpomish by Sobir Abdulla, Gʻunchalar by Zinnat Fatxullin, and Fargʻona hikoyasi by Hamid Gʻulom.

== Accolades ==
- Order of Lenin (18 March 1959)
- Two Orders of the Red Banner of Labour (31 May 1937 and 16 January 1950)
- Order of the Badge of Honour (23 December 1939)
- People's Artist of the Uzbek SSR (1937)
- Order of Outstanding Merit (23 August 2002)
