= Shuhrat Abbosov =

Uzbekistan actor and film director

- Шуҳрат Аббосов
- Born: 16 January 1931; Kokand, Uzbek SSR, Soviet Union
- Died: 25 April 2018 (aged 87); Tashkent, Uzbekistan
- Other name: Shukhrat Salikhovich Abbasov
- Occupations: Actor, film director, screenwriter, film producer
- Awards: Meritorious Artist of the Uzbek SSR (1965); People's Artist of the Uzbek SSR (1975); State Hamza Prize (1974); People's Artist of the USSR (1981); Shuhrat Medal (1994); Order of People's Honor (1998)

Shuhrat Abbosov (Note: Uzbek: Shuhrat Abbosov, Шуҳрат Аббосов; Russian: Шухрат Салихович Аббасов, romanized: Shukhrat Salikhovich Abbasov) (16 January 1931 – 25 April 2018) was an Uzbek actor, film director, screenwriter, and film producer. Abbasov was named People's Artist of the USSR in 1981, later he was also named People's Artist of Uzbekistan. Abbosov was celebrated as one of the founders of the Uzbek film industry.

== Life and career ==
Shuhrat Solihovich Abbosov was born in 1931 in Kokand, Uzbek SSR.

He graduated from the Tashkent Medical Vocational School in 1949. In 1954, Abbosov graduated from the Ostrovsky Tashkent Theater Arts Institute. Later he took graduate courses in film directing at Mosfilm, which he graduated in 1958. Abbasov's diploma film was the short The Filipino and the Drunkard (1958), adapted from a story by William Saroyan. His feature film debut, The Entire Makhalia Is Talking about This (1961), was shot at Uzbekfilm Studio. The comedic tale about the tensions between the younger and older generations became a hit with viewers and critics; it remains his best known work and is considered to be one of the best Uzbek films of all time. He is also known for writing the screenplay for the highly-popular 1977 adventure film The Mischievous Boy.

You Are Not an Orphan (1963) was hailed as a new page in the history of Uzbek cinema. The film tells the true story of a couple who adopted and raised fourteen orphaned children of different nationalities during the Great Patriotic War.

His film Tashkent Is a City of Bread (1968), from a semifictional novel by Aleksandr Neverov, set in 1921, tells the story of two peasant boys who are escaping the starved Russian countryside, hoping to find food in Central Asia. Abbasov then helmed the large-scale, two part biopic Abu-Raikhan Beruni (1975), produced on the occasion of the 1,000th anniversary of the medieval scholar, and Fiery Paths (1977–1985), a biographical television miniseries about the life and tragic fate of Uzbek author Hamza Hakimzade Niyazi.

As a director, he also staged many plays, including Abdulla Qahhor's Ogʻriq tishlar (Hurting Teeth) and Komil Yashin's Nurxon.

He received many honorary titles and awards, including the titles People's Artist of the Uzbek SSR in 1975 and People's Artist of the USSR in 1981. Many of Abbosov's films have been included into the Russian Cinema Academy's Golden Fund of Soviet Cinema's Classics.

=== Death ===
He died on 25 April 2018, aged 87, in Tashkent, Uzbekistan.

== Family ==
He had four kids: Nazim Abbasov, Eldjohn Abbasov, Asal Abbasova. His youngest daughter, Stefaniya Abbasova, is an artist and now lives in Poznań, Poland.

== Filmography ==
=== As director ===
- Васисуалий Лоханкин (Vasisualiy Lokhankin) (1959) (short film)
- Филиппинец и пьяный (The Filipino and the Drunkard) (1958) (short film)
- Mahallada duv-duv gap (Russian: Об этом говорит вся Махалля) (The Makhalla Rumors) (1960)
- Sen yetim emassan (Russian: Ты не сирота (You are Not an Orphan) (1962)
- Qalbingda quyosh (Russian: Прозрение) (The Enlightenment) (1965)
- Toshkent — non shahri (Russian: Ташкент — город хлебный) (Tashkent: The City of Bread) (1967)
- Sevgi fojeasi (Russian: Драма любви) (A Love Drama) (1971)
- Abu Rayhon Beruniy (Russian: Абу Райхан Беруни) (Abū Rayḥān Bīrūnī) (1974)
- Olovli yoʻllar (Russian: Огненные дороги) (The Roads of Fire) (1978–1984) (series)
- Katta urushdagi kichkina odam (Russian: Маленький человек в большой войне) (A Little Man in a Big War) (1989)
- Kamolot choʻqqisi sari (Toward the Peak of Perfection) (1995) (documentary series)
- Otamdan qolgan dalalar (Russian: Отчие долины) (Fields Which Remained from My Father) (1997)

=== As screenwriter ===
- Васисуалий Лоханкин (Vasisualiy Lokhankin) (1959) (short film)
- Sevgi fojeasi (Russian: Драма любви) (A Love Drama) (1971)
- Abu Rayhon Beruniy (Russian: Абу Райхан Беруни) (Abū Rayḥān Bīrūnī) (1974)
- Shum bola (Russian: Озорник) (The Mischievous Boy) (1977)
- Olovli yoʻllar (Russian: Огненные дороги) (The Roads of Fire) (1978–1984) (series)
- Счастье мое, ты оплачено кровью (My Happiness, Paid with Blood) (1993)
- Otamdan qolgan dalalar (Russian: Отчие долины) (The Fields Which Remained from My Father) (1997)

=== As actor ===
- Птицы наших надежд (The Birds of Our Hopes) (1976) (not credited)
- Goʻzallik siri (Russian: Тайна красоты) (The Secret of Beauty) (2006) (bit part)
