= Quddus =

Quddus (Quddūs قدوس) is one of the names of God in Islam, meaning "The Most Holy". It may also serve as a name, typically in construct form with "abd". See:

- Abdul Quddus, Male theophoric given name
- Ruhul Quddus (disambiguation), Male theophoric given name
- Quddus (TV personality) (born 1980), Canadian television personality

== People ==
- Quddús (1820–1849), title of the most prominent disciple of the Báb
- Quddus Fielea (born 1967), Tongan rugby union footballer
- Quddus Khojamyarov (1918–1994), Uyghur Kazakhstani composer and musical performer
- Quddus Mirza (born 1961), Pakistani artist and critic
- Quddus Muhammadiy (1907–1997), Uzbek writer
- Shahrukh Quddus (born 1996), Kuwaiti cricketer
- S. Mohammad Quddus Zaman (born 1960), Bangladeshi High Court justice
