= Yoʻldoshev =

Yoʻldoshev (feminine Yoʻldosheva) is a surname. Notable people with the surname include:

- Akrom Yo‘ldoshev (1963–2010/11), Uzbekistani Islamist
- Bahodir Yoʻldoshev (1945–2021), Uzbek actor
- Ibrohimxalil Yoʻldoshev (born 2001), Uzbek footballer
- Lola Yoʻldosheva (born 1962), Uzbekistani singer and actress
