= Uygʻun =

Uzbek poet, dramatist, writer, and politician (1905–1990)

Uyg‘un
- Born: Rahmatulla Otaqoʻziyev; 14 May [O.S. 1 May] 1905; Merki, Russian Empire
- Died: 24 April 1990 (aged 84); Tashkent, Uzbek SSR, USSR
- Awards: Hero of Socialist Labour; State Hamza Prize

Uyg‘un (Birth name Uzbek: Rahmatulla Otaqoʻziyev, Russian: Рахматулла Атакузиев, romanized Rakhmatulla Atakuziev, Уйгун (Uighun/Uyghun/Uygun), 14 May [O.S. 1 May] 1905 – 22 April 1990) was an Uzbek poet, dramatist, writer, and politician. He received many high honors for his work including Hero of Socialist Labour and People's Poet of the Uzbek SSR.

== Early life ==
Uyg‘un born on 14 May [O.S. 1 May] 1905 as Rahmatulla Otaqoʻziyev in the village of Merki, (located in present-day Jambyl oblast, Kazakhstan) to a working-class family. He enrolled in the Tashkent Pedagogical College in 1925 and graduated in 1925. He then worked as a teacher of literature at an Agricultural College. In 1927 his first poems were published in several magazines. That year he entered the Pedagogical Academy in Samarkand, graduating in 1930. Previously in 1929 a collection of his poems “Joys of Spring” (Uzbek: Bahor sevinchlari) was published. After graduating he went back to working as a teacher before his writing career took off.

== Career ==
From 1930 to 1931 he worked at the magazine Qurilish, then he worked as a researcher at the Institute of Language and Literature from 1933 to 1943. Meanwhile, he worked at the Institute of Culture from 1932 to 1933 and from 1947 to 1948 he worked as a deputy artistic director at the drama theater named after Hamza. He then started working at the magazine "Sharq yulduzi", becoming its editor-in-chief in 1950. However, he did not hold the post for long, as he became the chairman of the Board of the Union of Writers of the Uzbek SSR in 1951, and served as chairman there until 1954. In 1974 he became a corresponding member of the Academy of Sciences of the Uzbek SSR.

In 1939 he wrote the liberetto for the first Uzbek ballet Gulandom. During the early 1940s his poetry focused on themes tied to World War II, such as his Songs of Victory collection in 1942. One of the most famous works of Uyg‘un's career was the drama Alisher Navoi that he co-wrote as a screenwriter. He also worked as a screenwriter on Lenin yo‘llanmasi bilan (With Lenin's Guide). After going through a period in 1946 to 1948 of being attacked and expected to make public confessions of wrongdoing in his writings, he became much more careful in what he wrote, and focused more on simpler works appealing to the political climate; as result, most of his works from the 1950s emphasized the values of patriotism and hard work, such as the drama Navbahor that emphasizes the value of women workers in a collectivized economy and a play celebrating the construction of the Farhad hydroelectic power plant. His later works were somewhat critical of the Soviet government, such as his drama Shubha in 1961 which emphasized the problems with the cult of personality surrounding the Stalin era, especially in rural areas. Other dramas he wrote reflected the conditions of rural areas of Uzbekistan, such as the drama Qotil that brought up the problems arising from the high demand for cotton; however, it was censored and accused of distorting reality. He also wrote comedies, such as Parvona in addition for various historically themed works dramatizing the lives of famous people from Central Asia such as al-Biruni, Ibn Sina, and Zeb-un-Nissa. He received various accolades for his work, including the titles Honored Artist of the Uzbek SSR in 1956, People's poet of the Uzbek SSR in 1965 and Hero of Socialist Labour in 1985. In addition to authoring Uzbek literature he worked on translations into Uzbek of major works of English and Russian literature including The Seagull by Anton Chekhov, Julius Caesar by William Shakespeare, Hadji Murat by Leo Tolstoy, and many works of Alexander Pushkin.

He died of a long illness in Tashkent on 22 April 1990.

== Awards and honours ==
- Hero of Socialist Labor (14 May 1985)
- Three Orders of Lenin (6 December 1951, 2 July 1971, 14 May 1985)
- Order of the October Revolution (13 May 1975)
- Two Orders of the Red Banner of Labour (16 January 1950 and 18 March 1959)
- Order of Friendship of Peoples (4 March 1980)
- Two Orders of the Badge of Honor (25 December 1944 and 1 March 1965)
- Honored Worker of Art of the Uzbek SSR (14 May 1956)
- People's Poet of the Uzbek SSR (17 May 1965)
- State Hamza Prize (1967)
