= Sora Eshontoʻrayeva =

Soviet and Uzbek actress

- Сора Эшонтўраева
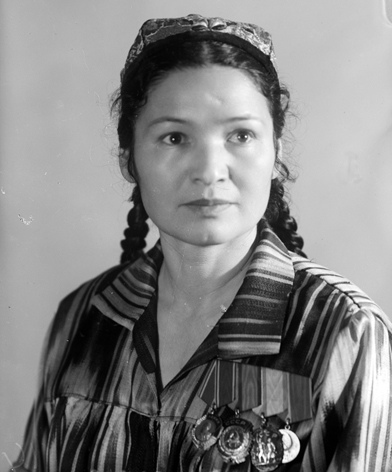
- Born: November 8, 1911; Beshbuloq, Russian Empire (present-day Uzbekistan)
- Died: September 8, 1998 (aged 86); Tashkent, Uzbekistan
- Spouse: Abror Hidoyatov
- Awards: People's Artist of the USSR (1951); Order of Lenin (1945, 1971); State Hamza Prize (1967)

Sora Abdurahmonovna Eshontoʻrayeva (Note: Uzbek: Sora Abdurahmonovna Eshontoʻrayeva, Сора Абдураҳмоновна Эшонтўраева; Russian: Сара Абдурахмановна Ишантураева, romanized: Sara Abdurakhmanovna Ishanturayeva) (8 November [O.S. 26 October] 1911 – 8 September 1998) was a Soviet and Uzbek actress. She was one of the first actresses of the Uzbek SSR to gain national prominence. She was described as a "pearl of the Uzbek scene".

== Early life ==
Sora Abdurahmonovna Eshontoʻrayeva was born on 8 November [O.S. 26 October] 1911 to an Uzbek peasant family in Beshbuloq village. After the death of her father when she was very young, her mother gave away her and two of her siblings to be raised by foster parents. In her youth she attended the Zeb-un-Nissa boarding school for girls in Tashkent, where she began acting in plays. When she was only nine years old she had to start wearing a paranja, and later was bethrothed to a neighbor, but she soon abandoned wearing the face-veil and eventually married fellow artist Abror Hidoyatov.

She left Uzbekistan in 1924 as part of a group of 24 Uzbek theater students chosen to study in Moscow. The students would later form the Hamza Drama Theater. The group returned to Uzbekistan in 1927, where they were in danger of being attacked by religious fanatics for their encouragement of unveiling. Several of Eshontoʻrayeva's colleagues were murdered by religious fanatics, including Tursunoy Saidazimova who was killed when the group was on tour in Bukhara in 1928, followed by the murder of Hamza in Shohimardon in 1929.

== Career ==
Having graduated theater school and relocated to Samarkand in 1927, Eshontoʻrayeva's acting career took off by the 1930s. She played lead roles in major plays, including Tursunoy in the play Hujum and Beatrice in The Servant of Two Masters. She went on to act as the lead female protagonist in many more productions at the theater, which included both new Uzbek plays by playwrights such as Hamza and Komil Yashin as well as old classics such as Hamlet by Shakespeare, in which she played the role of Ophelia. From 1946 to 1955 and 1981 to 1985, she served as chairman of the board of the Theater Society of the Uzbek SSR. She also appeared in several films.

In addition to her work as an actress, Eshontoʻrayeva was active in politics. She became a member of the Communist Party in 1939. She was also a member of the Supreme Soviet of the Uzbek SSR, a member of the Central Committee of the Communist Party of the Uzbek SSR, a delegate to the 19th Congress of the Communist Party, and a deputy in the Supreme Soviet of the USSR from the 2nd to 4th convocations (1946 to 1958). She also served as chairman of the board of the Uzbek branch of the Soviet Peace Foundation.

Eshontoʻrayeva died in Tashkent on 8 September 1998 and was buried in the Chigatoy cemetery.

== Family ==
Her husband Abror Hidoyatov was theater actor who received the title People's Artist of the USSR in 1945. Her son Goga Hidoyatov wasa historian, professor, and doctor of historical sciences who received the title Honored Worker of Science of the Republic of Uzbekistan. Her granddaughters Nigora Gogovna Hidoyatova and Nodira Gogovna Hidoyatova are entrepreneurs.

== Awards ==
- People's Artist of the Uzbek SSR (1937)
- People's Artist of the USSR (6 December 1951)
- Stalin Prize (1949)
- USSR State Prize (1977)
- State Hamza Prize (1967)
- Two Order of Lenin (24 March 1945 and 15 December 1971)
- Order of the October Revolution (22 March 1991)
- Order of the Red Banner of Labor (31 May 1937, 16 January 1950, 6 December 1951, 1957, and 18 March 1959)
- Order of Friendship of Peoples (6 November 1981)
- Order of the Badge of Honor (1939)
- Medal "For Distinguished Labour" (1944)
- Sogʻlom Avlod Uchun Order (1993)
- Order of Outstanding Merit (23 August 2004, posthumously)

== See also ==
- Iroda Aliyeva
- Rano Yarasheva
