= Laziz Qayumov =

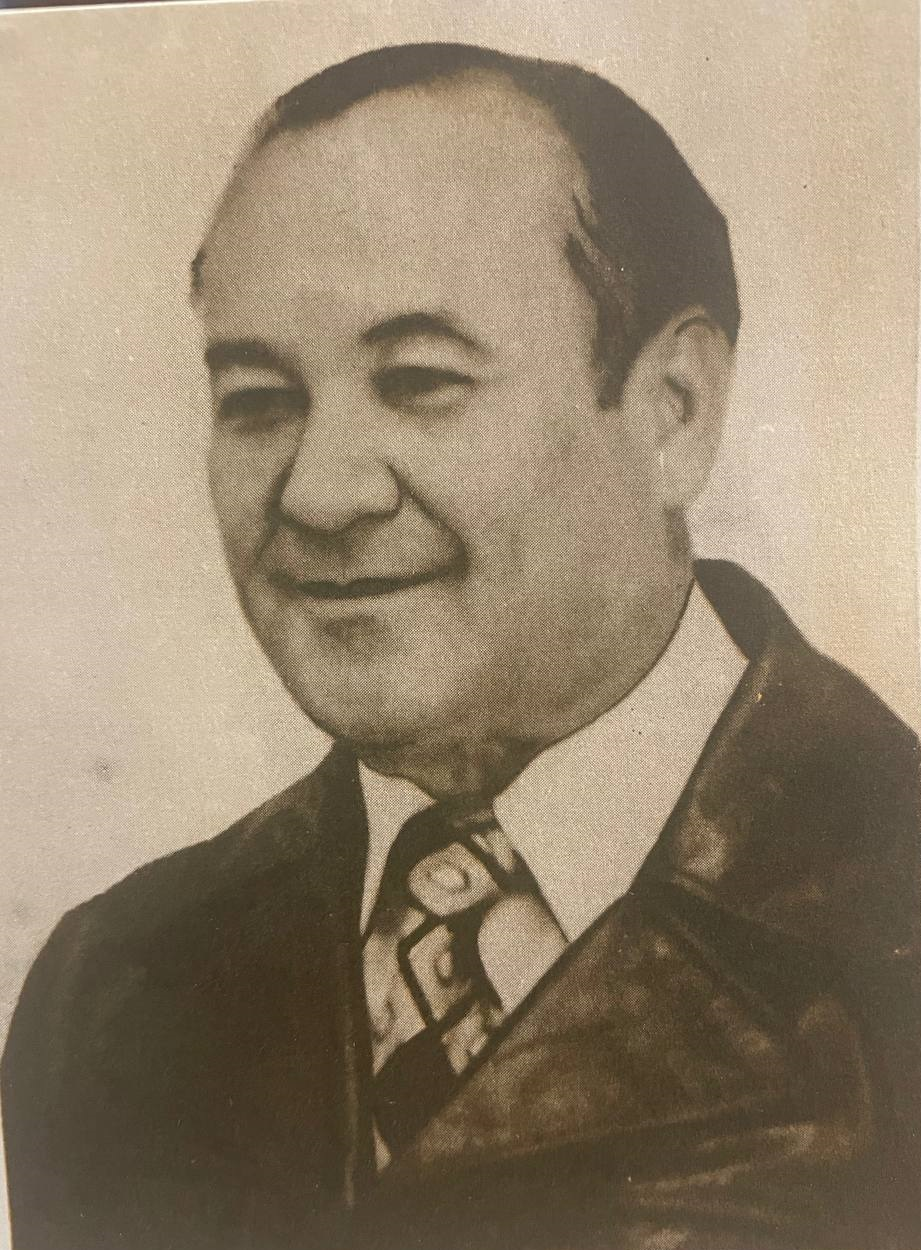
- Born: 23 April 1930; Kokand
- Died: 11 January 2004 (aged 73); Tashkent
- Citizenship: Soviet Union; Uzbekistan
- Education: National University of Uzbekistan

Laziz Qayumov (Uzbek: Laziz Poʻlatovich Qayumov, April 23, 1930, in Kokand – January 11, 2004, in Tashkent) was a Soviet and Uzbek literary critic and academic. He held many high titles including Honored Scientist of Uzbekistan (1980), Doctor of Philology (1963), and professor (1965).

== Life and career ==
Laziz Qayumov was born on April 23, 1930, in Kokand, in the family of teacher Po'latjon Qayumov. He graduated from the Central Asian State University, Faculty of Philology (1952). At the same university he was a teacher (1953–56), associate professor (1956–65), dean (1960–62), head of the department of literature of the peoples of the USSR (1963–85; since 1988), "Culture of Uzbekistan" (1962–81), "Soviet Uzbekistan" (1984–88) was the editor-in-chief of the newspaper.

In addition to his main job, he was involved in social activities. In particular, he was the chairman of the Society for Friendship with the Countries of Asia and Africa, a member of the International Association of Literary Critics, the chairman of the language and literature section of the Knowledge Society of the UzSSR, a member of the presidium of the Writers' Union of Uzbekistan and a member of the Writers' Union of the USSR. In 1974, he was awarded the All-Union Prize of the Union of Writers and Journalists of the USSR for the best critical works of the year.

He died in 2004.

== Literary works ==
Laziz Qayumov authored 25 scientific and artistic works dedicated to the work and life of Hamza Hakimzade Niyazi and other figures of Uzbek literature.

He also wrote books, under his authorship "Революционная песня" ("Revolutionary Song") (biography of Hamza) (1962), "Революция и творчество" ("Revolution and Creativity") (1964), "Революционная драма" ("Revolutionary Drama") (1970), "Hamza" (1973, 1989), "Shoira Zulfiya" (1965, 1975), "Алмазный талант" ("Diamond Talent") (1965), "Современники" ("Contemporaries") (1972), "Век и проза" ("Century and Prose") (1975). Laziz Qayumov was also the author of the collections of stories "Учитель" ("Teacher") (1954), «Гулистонинг Сенин» ("Gulistoning Senin"), "Мехри Дарьё" ("Mehri river") (1975), "Встречи на меридиане" ("Meetings on the Meridian") (1976).

== Awards ==
- Medal "For Distinguished Labour"
- Order of the Badge of Honour
- State Hamza Prize (1973)
- Honored Scientist of the Uzbek SSR (22 April 1980)
