= Firudin Safarov =

Azerbaijani theatre director (1933–2024)

- Firudin Səfərov
- Born: 1 August 1933; Baku, Azerbaijan SSR, Transcaucasian SFSR, USSR
- Died: 26 July 2024 (aged 90)
- Occupation: Theatre director
- Spouse: Franghiz Ahmadova
- Awards

Firudin Sattar oghlu Safarov (Azerbaijani: Firudin Səttar oğlu Səfərov, 1 August 1933 – 26 July 2024) was an Azerbaijani theatre director, Professor of Tashkent State Conservatory, and a People's Artist of the Uzbek SSR (1986), People's Artiste of Azerbaijan (1992).

== Biography ==
Firudin Safarov was born in Baku on 1 August 1933. He studied percussion at the Hajibeyov Azerbaijan State Conservatoire, then graduated from the faculty of musical theater directing at the N. A. Rimsky-Korsakov Saint Petersburg State Conservatory.

After working as a musician in the Hajibeyov Azerbaijan State Symphony Orchestra, led by the famous conductor Niyazi, he continued his career as a production director at the Azerbaijan State Academic Opera and Ballet Theater.

In 1977, Firudin Safarov was invited to the Alisher Navoi State Academic Big Theatre and worked there from that year. He was a professor of the opera training faculty of the Tashkent State Conservatory.

Safarov died on 26 July 2024, at the age of 90.

== Awards ==
- People's Artist of the Uzbek SSR (1986)
- People's Artiste of Azerbaijan (10 September 1992)
- State Hamza Prize (1981)
- Taraggi Medal (13 March 2006)
