= Ruhul Quddus (disambiguation) =

Ruhul Quddus is a Bengali masculine given name of Arabic origin. It may refer to:

== People ==
- Ruhul Quddus, first and only secretary general of the Bangladesh Cabinet and the first Principal Secretary of the Prime Ministers' Office
- Ruhul Quddus Talukdar (born 1962), Bangladeshi politician and former minister
- Shah Md. Ruhul Quddus, Bangladeshi politician

== Other uses ==
- Ruh al-Qudus (magazine), Persian journal

== See also ==
- Ruh
- Quddus
