= Quddus Muhammadiy =

Uzbek writer, poet, and playwright (1907–1997)

Quddus Muhammadiy Куддус Мухаммади
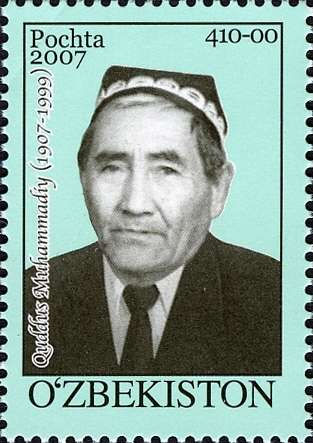
- Uzbek stamp commemorating Quddus Muhammadiy
- Born: 25 October 1907; Tashkent, Russian Empire
- Died: 21 June 1997 (aged 89); Tashkent, Uzbekistan
- Occupations: Playwright; academic writer; poet
- Writing career
- Notable awards: State Hamza Prize (1970); People's Poet of Uzbekistan (1977)

Quddus Muhammadiy (25 October 1907 – 21 June 1997) was an Uzbek writer of children's literature, a poet, academic writer, and playwright.

== Biography ==
Quddus Muhammadiy was born to a family of farmers in Tashkent on 25 October 1907. After secondary-agricultural school, he studied at the faculty of biology at the University of Central Asia.

His first works were published in the newspaper East and in the Journal of the Face of the Earth. From 1928, his poems were published in the press under the pseudonym 'Jerusalem'. His best-known poems, such as "Sandals and stove" and "Self-criticism", were written between 1936 and 1937. He also worked as a translator. Muhammadiy died in Tashkent on 21 June 1997.

== Awards and honours ==
Muhammadiy was awarded the State Hamza Prize in 1970 and the title of People's Poet of Uzbekistan in 1977. In 2025, he received a posthumous presidential award for "selfless service".

== Selected works ==
- Surprise the Reader (1946)
- Test (1947)
- The Reader Memorable (1947)
- Poetry and Fairy Tales (1947)
- Dream (1948)
- Spring (1950)
- The Most Powerful in the World? (1951)
- Forty Girls (1951)
- Our friends (1952)
- Your Birthday (1952)
- The New House (1953)
- Good Friends (1953)
- The Beetle and the Little Mouse (1955)
- Button (1956)
- What Ought I to Do? (1960)
- Very Interesting, Very Beautiful (1961)
- Mother-Child Love (1963)
- The Beginning of the Child
- The Age of Boys (1964)
- Inspiration (1967)
- Little Friends (1978)
- The Song of the Shepherd (1979)
- The Book and the Sun (1986)
- I Want You to Speak Wisdom (1987)

== See also ==
- Abdulla Qahhor
- Abdulla Oripov
- Cho'lpon
- G'afur G'ulom
- Khudoyberdi Tuktaboyev
- Tohir Malik
