= Pirimqul Qodirov =

Uzbek writer (1928–2010)

- Born: Pirimqul Qodirov; October 25, 1928; Kengkol Village, Uzbek SSR, USSR
- Died: December 10, 2010 (aged 82); Tashkent, Uzbekistan
- Occupation: Novelist; short story writer; translator
- Education: Tashkent State University
- Genres: Historical fiction and adventure fiction
- Literary movement: Socialist realism
- Notable awards: State Hamza Prize (1966); National Writer of the Uzbek SSR (1988); Order of Outstanding Merit (2006)

Pirimqul Qodirov (Note: Uzbek: Pirimqul Qodirov, Пиримқул Қодиров; Russian: Пиримкул Кадыров, romanized: Pirimkul Kadyrov.) (25 October 1928 – 20 December 2010) was an Uzbek novelist, short story writer, and literary translator. His best known work is Babur: Starry Nights (Uzbek: Yulduzli tunlar), a fictionalized account of the life and conquests of the Mughal emperor Babur. Babur is one of the most widely read novels in Uzbekistan, and Qodirov receiving many awards for it, including the State Hamza Prize.

Qodirov is also known for translating the works of many Russian authors, including Leo Tolstoy, Mikhail Lermontov, and Konstantin Fedin. He died in Tashkent in 2010.

== Life and work ==
Pirimqul Qodirov was born on 25 October 1928 in Kengkol Village, Uzbek SSR, located in what is now the Istaravshan District of Tajikistan. He entered the preparatory department of the Central Asian State University in 1945, and the next year he started studying at the Eastern Faculty of the university. He graduated in 1951 before moving to Moscow, where he attended the Gorky Institute of World Literature. In 1954, he successfully defended his dissertation, the subject of which was the writings of Abdulla Qahhor.

From 1954 to 1963, Qodirov worked at the Union of Soviet Writers where he consulted on matters of Uzbek literature. Later on in his career he became a senior researcher at the Institute of Language and Literature of the Academy of Sciences of the Uzbek SSR.

Over the course of many decades Qodirov wrote numerable works ranging from nonfiction educational books to novels with moral and spiritual themes. His most celebrated work is the 1978 novel Starry Nights, which has been translated into a dozen languages, including Russian, English and Turkish. His other historical novels include Avlodlar dovoni (Pass of Generations) (1988) and Ona lochin vidosi (Farewell of the Falcon's Mother) (2001).

Qodirov died in Tashkent in 2010.

== Awards and accolades ==
Qodirov received many Soviet awards including the State Hamza Prize in 1981, the title People's Writer of the Uzbek SSR in 1988, and the title Honored Worker of Culture of the Uzbek SSR in 1978. After Uzbekistan became independent, he received many Uzbek state awards for his work, including the Order of Outstanding Merit in 2006.
