= Gʻani Aʼzamov =

Soviet-Uzbek actor (1909–2001)

G‘ani Aʼzamov
- Born: Gʻani Aʼzamov; January 7, 1909; Tashkent, Old Sirdaryo region, Uzbek SSR, USSR
- Died: 2001; Tashkent, Uzbekistan
- Occupation: actor
- Awards: O‘zbekiston SSR xalq artisti (People's Artist of the Uzbek SSR); State Prize of the Uzbek SSR Named After Hamza

G‘ani Aʼzamov (7 January 1909 – 2001) was a Soviet Uzbek actor of theater and cinema. People's Artist of the Uzbek SSR (1961). He was a laureate of the State Prize of the Uzbek SSR Named After Hamza.

== Biography ==
After completing the preparatory teacher training courses named after F. Dzerzhinsky in 1928, he worked as an educator at a school. In 1930, he appeared on the stage of the Hamza Theater in Tashkent (now Uzbek National Academic Drama Theater). He performed in small episodes, various roles in crowd scenes, and eventually became interested in the art.

Throughout his 60-year creative career, Gani Aʼzamov consistently learned from great masters. Alongside elegant portrayals, Gani Aʼzamov crafted solid, decisive characters, such as the portrayal of Munajjim in Uygur and Izzat Sultanov's drama "Alisher Navoi," Arslonsher in the play "Chin muhabbat" by S. Azimov, Yusuf in the play "Soʻnggi nusxalar" by Abdulla Qahhor, Launce in William Shakespeare's comedy "The Two Gentlemen of Verona". From the inception of the film magazine "Nashtar," he played Hodja Nasreddin in it.

Starting in 1953, Gani Agzamov acted in movies, creating a series of vivid characters in films produced at the "Uzbekfilm" film studio.

== Theatrical roles ==
During his career, he played many roles in theater:

- ("Bay i batrak" Hamza Hakimzoda Niyoziy), Domla Imam
- ("Alisher Navoi" I. Sulton and Uygun), Astrologer
- ("The Government Inspector" N. Gogol), Bobchinskiy
- ("Nastoyashaya lyubov" S. Azimova), Arslonsher
- ("Ayadjonlarim" A. Qahhara), Ashuraliev
- ("Zolotaya stena" E. Vohidova), Mumin

== Awards ==
- People's Artist of the Uzbek SSR (1961)
- State Hamza Prize (1989)

== Filmography ==
He also played many roles in films:

- In 1953 — "Bay i batrak" — Domla Imam
- In 1956 — "Svyashennaya krov" — groom
- In 1956 — "Avitsenna" — librarian
- In 1958 — "Maftuningman" — hairdresser
- In 1958 — "Po putyovke Lenina"
- In 1960 — "Mahallada duv-duv gap"
- In 1964 — "Yor-yor (film)"
- In 1966 — "Poema dvux serdes" — Kara Shah
- In 1967 — "Tashkent — gorod xlebniy" — headman
- In 1969 — "Zaveianiye starogo mastera" — Yusup the loser
- In 1969 — "Vlyublennie"
- In 1971 — "Drama lyubvi"
- In 1972 — "Semurg"
- In 1972 — "Etot slavniy paren"
- In 1973 — "Moy dobriy chelovek" — watchman
- In 1973 — "Vstrechi i rasstavaniya"
- In 1974 — "Trebuyetsya tigr"
- In 1974 — "Abu Rayxan Beruni" — peasant
- In 1975 — "Vkus xalvi" — resident of noble Bukhara
- In 1978-1984 — "Fiery Roads" — mullah
- In 1978 — "Toʻylar muborak" — tightrope walker
- In 1978 — "Povar i pevitsa" — Grandpa Ziyo
- In 1982 — "Babushka-general" — Kholmat
- In 1990 — "Chudo-jenshina" — Dasaev
- In 1991 — "Perviy potseluy"
- In 1991 — "Jelezniy mujchina"
