= Zikir Muhammadjonov =

- Born: 1 January 1921; Tashkent, Turkestan ASSR, RSFSR
- Died: 23 August 2012 (aged 91); Tashkent, Uzbekistan
- Citizenship: RSFSR → USSR → Uzbekistan
- Education: Uzbekistan State Institute of Arts and Culture
- Occupation: Actor
- Years active: 1938–2012
- Notable work: Sohni Mahiwal

Zikir Muhammadjonov (Uzbek: Zikir Muhammadjonov, Зикир Муҳаммаджонов; 1921 – 23 August 2012) was a Soviet and Uzbek theater and film actor. He received numerous prestigious awards, including the title People's Artist of the USSR in 1977, and USSR State Prize in 1977. He is recognized as a People's Artist of Uzbekistan.

== Biography ==
Zikir Muhammadjonov was born on 1 January (according to other sources – 14 August) 1921 in Tashkent. He played on the stage of the school amateur theater, where he played all the main roles. In 1938, he joined the State Uzbek Drama Theater named after Hamza. He worked in the theater for the rest of his life. He played over three hundred roles, including Ulugh Beg, Abu-Reyhan Biruni, Ali-Shir Nava'i, Husayn Bayqarah, Amir Temur. The war prevented him from starting his studies, during which (1941–1943) he worked at an aircraft factory, in Tashkent, where he mastered plumbing.

Muhammadjonov graduated from the Tashkent State Institute of Theater Arts named after I. A. N. Ostrovsky in 1949. He studied during the day, worked in the theater in the evening.

Muhammadjonov began appearing in films in 1956, and has starred in more than 40 films. He dubbed a large number of films for the "Uzbekfilm" studio. He was a member of the Union of Cinematographers of the Uzbek SSR.

=== Family ===
Muhammadjonov was married for 70 years. He had five sons and a daughter, Feruza (deceased), as well as 17 grandchildren.

== Awards ==
- Hero of Uzbekistan (2003)
- Honored Artist of the Uzbek SSR (1956)
- People's Artist of the Uzbek SSR (1964)
- People's Artist of the USSR (1977)
- USSR State Prize (1977) — for playing the role of Lenin in the performance "Dawn of the Revolution"
- State Hamza Prize (1989)
- Order of Lenin (1986)
- Two Orders of the Red Banner of Labor (1970, 1975)
- Order Dostlik Uzbekistan (1994)
- Order of Outstanding Merit Uzbekistan (1998)
- Certificate of honor of the Republic of Uzbekistan (1991)

== See also ==
- Iroda Aliyeva
