= Isohor Oqilov =

Soviet artist, dancer, ballet master, and choreographer

Isohor Xaimovich Oqilov (14 July 1914, Samarkand – 27 September 1988, Tashkent) was a Soviet artist, dancer, ballet master, choreographer and a People's Artist of the Uzbek SSR (1970). He was also a recipient of the State Hamza Prize.

== Biography ==
He was born in Samarkand on 14 July 1914.

Growing up in the family of a dancer, from childhood he showed interest in art. Initially engaged in singing, had, according to some estimates, a very good voice.

He began his creative career in the Samarkand amateur group "Kuk Kuylak", organised by ballet master Ali Ardobus. In 1928-1929, he studied at the Samarkand Research Institute of Music and Choreography, simultaneously performing as a dancer. In 1929-1932, he studied in the studio at the Uzbek State Musical Theatre. In 1929, at the invitation of Muhitdin Qoriyoqubov, he joined the troupe of the Experimental Musical Drama Theatre in Samarkand as an actor and dancer.

In 1930, he took part in the All-Union Olympiad of Theatres and Arts of the Peoples of the USSR as a dancer in the troupe of the Uzbek State Musical Theatre of the People's Commissariat of the Uzbek SSR, which brought to the Olympiad a large concert programme and two performances ("Halima" and "Urtoklar").

He worked as a ballet master of the troupe of the Bukhara Jewish State Theatre under the People's Commissariat of Education of the Uzbek SSR.

Being in search of young talents on the assignment of the theatre management, he first saw his future wife Margarita on the stage of the theatre named after Lakhuti. In 1935, Isahar and Margarita were married.

For some time he taught at the Lakhuti State Theatre Technical School of the People's Commissariat of the Uzbek SSR (which existed in Tashkent from 1932 to 1939), being, at the same time, one of its first graduates.

From 1935 to 1978 he was the chief ballet master of the Uzbek Song and Dance Ensemble (since 1956 - ensemble "Shodlik").

From 1937 he worked as a ballet master at the Uzbek State Philharmonic.

During the Great Patriotic War he participated in front-line concert brigades under the call "All for the front, all for the victory!".

He trained at the State Academic Folk Dance Ensemble under the mentorship of Igor Moiseyev.

He died on 27 September 1988 in Tashkent. He is buried in the Bukhara-Jewish cemetery "Chigatai".
