= Olim Xoʻjayev =

Uzbek stage and film actor (1910–1977)

- Born: 24 September 1910; Bukhara, Emirate of Bukhara
- Died: 14 February 1977 (aged 66); Moscow, RSFSR, USSR
- Citizenship: Russian Empire; Soviet Union

Olim Xoʻjayev (Note: Uzbek: Olim Xoʻjayev, Олим Хўжаев; Russian: Алим Ходжаев, romanized: Alim Khodzhaev.) (24 September 1910 – 14 February 1977) was a celebrated Uzbek stage and movie actor. Over a career that spanning nearly five decades, Xoʻjayev received numerous accolades. Some of his most notable roles in theater include Hamlet and Othello in Soviet productions of Shakespeare's plays and the role of Hamza Hakimzade Niyazi in the 1960 film Hamza directed by Zagid Sabitov.

== Life and work ==
Olim Xoʻjayev was born on 24 September 1910 in Bukhara. After graduation from the Bukhara Institute of Education in 1929, he worked at the Hamza State Theater, where he worked for the rest of his life. In 1955, he became the chairman of the Union of Theater Actors of Uzbekistan.

Xoʻjayev was a member of the Central Committee of the Communist Party of Uzbekistan from 1966 to 1971 and then from 1976 to 1977.

== Awards ==
- People's Artist of the Uzbek SSR (1948)
- People's Artist of the USSR (18 March 1959)
- Stalin Prize 2nd class (1949)
- USSR State Prize (1977)
- State Hamza Prize (1967)
- Order of Lenin (6 October 1970)
- Order of the Red Banner of Labour (6 December 1951)
- Two Order of the Badge of Honour (24 March 1945 and 16 January 1950)
- Medal "For Labour Valour" (1 March 1965)
- Order of Outstanding Merit (23 August 2002)
