= Xudoyberdi Toʻxtaboyev =

Uzbek children's writer (1932–2021)

- Born: 17 December 1932; Fergana, Uzbek SSR, Soviet Union
- Died: 21 March 2021 (aged 88)
- Occupations: Playwright; writer; literary translator

Xudoyberdi Toʻxtaboyev (17 December 1932 – 21 March 2021) was an Uzbek writer of children's stories.

== Life and career ==
Toʻxtaboyev was born in the city of Fergana in 1932. After he finished primary and secondary school, he studied at the department of philology at the University of Central Asia from 1950 until 1955. He worked for a time as a newspaper journalist, including at Toshkent haqiqati and Qizil Oʻzbekiston, and he was the editor of the monthly magazine Guliston. From 1972 until 1977, he worked as chief editor at the Yosh Gvardiya publishing house and as assistant to the chief editor at the Sharq Yulduzi magazine. In those days, he also worked as chief of editing at the Yosh Kuch newspaper.

Toʻxtaboyev began his career as a children's writer in 1958. He created the collection of stories Shoshqoloq in 1962, followed by other collections: Yosh Gvardiya, Sir Ochildi, and Sehrli Qolpoqcha (1965). His writing was popular throughout Uzbekistan, and many children read his books as part of their school studies.

Toʻxtaboyev worked at the Kamalak publishing house as an editor, and then as lead editor. From 1960 until 1970, his most popular books were translated into other languages.

== Works ==
Toʻxtaboyev is famous for his humorous novels. His books touch on themes including honesty, love, loyalty, and kindness. His stories include: Sariq devni minib (1969) and Sariq devning oʻlimi (1973). Other works include Besh bolali yigitcha, Qasoskorning oltin boshi, Yillar and yoʻllar (1983), and Sehrgarlar jangi. For his contribution to literature, Toʻxtaboyev received the State Hamza Prize in 1989 and became a National Writer of Uzbekistan in 1991, when the country gained its independence from the Soviet Union.

== See also ==
- Tohir Malik
- Hamid Olimjon
