= Komil Yashin =

Uzbek Soviet writer and poet (1909–1997)

- Комил Яшин; Komil Yashin
- Born: Komil Noʻmonov; 25 December [O.S. 12 December] 1909; Andijan, Russian Turkestan
- Died: 25 September 1997 (aged 87); Tashkent, Uzbekistan
- Citizenship: Russian Empire; Soviet Union; Uzbekistan
- Spouse: Halima Nosirova
- Writing career
- Notable awards: State Hamza Prize (1967); People's Writer of the Uzbek SSR (1972); Hero of Socialist Labor (1974); Order of the October Revolution (1979); Order of Friendship of Peoples (1984)

Komil Yashin (Note: Uzbek: كاميل يشين, romanized: Komil Yashin, cyrillized: Комил Яшин, pronounced [kɔˈmɪl jɐˈʃɪn]; Russian: Камиль Яшен, IPA: [kɐˈmʲilʲ jɐˈʂɨn]) (25 December [O.S. 12 December] 1909 — 25 September 1997) was a Soviet-Uzbek author, poet, dramatist, and screenwriter. Ogonyok magazine described him as "the greatest modern Uzbek playwright".

Yashin held many high-level political offices in the Soviet Union and served as a deputy in the Supreme Soviet of the USSR. He received numerous awards and titles, including the title People's Writer of the Uzbek SSR in 1972, (Note: Great Soviet Encyclopedia incorrectly lists his People's Writer of the Uzbek SSR award as having been issued in 1969.) the Stalin Prize in 1951, and the title Hero of Socialist Labor in 1974.

== Early life and career ==
Komil Noʻmonov was born on 25 December [O.S. 12 December] 1909 in Andijan to an Uzbek family. From 1921 to 1925, he attended a Russian secondary school. After graduating high school he started his literary activity, taking on the pen name Yashin in 1925. He entered the Leningrad Forestry Institute that year but was forced to return to Andijan in 1928 due to illness. He taught literature and physics in Andijan from then until 1930. Yashin then became the head of the literary department initially at the Andijan Regional Theater and later the Uzbek State Musical Theater, where he worked until 1936.

Yashin became a member of the Communist Party in 1943. He held many high-level political offices. He served as head of the General Directorate of Arts under the Council of Ministers from 1946 to 1949. From 1958 to 1980, he served as the chairman of the Writers' Union of Uzbekistan. He was also the chairman of the Soviet Liaison Committee for Afro-Asian Writers and served as a deputy in the Supreme Soviet of the USSR. Yashin was also the editor-in-chief of the magazine Oʻzbek tili va adabiyoti from 1969 to 1980.

Yashin was married to Halima Nosirova, a famous Uzbek opera singer. He died in Tashkent after a long illness on 25 September 1997 at the age of 87.

== Works ==
Much of Yashin's work are dramas with political themes. His earliest dramas include Kar quloq, Teng tengi bilan, Lolaxon, and Quyosh. Some of his major works from the 1930s include the plays Oʻrtoqlar, Yondiramiz, and Nomus va muhabbat. The play he wrote originally titled Ichkarida was later reworked into a musical drama under the title Gulsara, with Muzaffar Muhamedov as co-author, and in 1934 he reworked the play Ikki kommunist into Tor-mor. In 1940, he wrote the musical Nurxon based on the like of honor killing victim Nurkhon Yuldashkhojayeva, showing her as a martyr of women's liberation.

In the years leading up to World War II, Yashin wrote librettos for the first national operas in the Uzbek SSR, such as Boʻron and Ulugʻ kanal. He continued to write plays during the war, which included Oʻlim bosqinchilarga (co-authored with Sobir Abdulla), Davron ota (co-authored with Sobir Abdulla), Farod va Shirin and Oftobxon, some of which were focused on themes relating to the struggles against the Nazi invaders to boost the morale of Soviet troops.

After the war Yashin wrote the script for the play General Rakhimov (1949) based on the real life of the Uzbek general Sobir Rakhimov. He authored and co-authored numerous other plays with political and cultural themes including Ravshan va Zulxumor and Inqilob tongi.

=== Influence of Hamza Hakim-zade Niyazi ===
Yashin had been friends with the famous Uzbek writer Hamza Hakim-zade Niyazi, who was stoned to death in Shohimardon by religious fanatics in 1929 for alleged blasphemy. He dedicated many works to Hamza. In 1960, Yashin wrote a musical about him titled Hamza. He was one of the screenwriters of the TV series Fiery Roads, where Hamza was featured as the main protagonist. Yashin also wrote a two-volume novel about Hamza, with the first volume being published in 1979 and the second in 1980.

Yashin also reworked many original plays by Hamza. In 1939, he created a new version of Hamza's play Boy ila xizmatchi. Another play by Hamza he reworked was Paranji sirlaridan bir lavha, which focused on the plight of women in pre-Soviet Uzbekistan.

== Legacy ==
Yashin has been widely praised for his contributions to Uzbek literature tradition. The Soviet writer Nikolai Tikhonov described him as one of the most famous students of Hamza Hakim-zade Niyazi. The Ogonyok magazine described him as "the greatest modern Uzbek playwright". There are streets bearing his name in Tashkent and Andijan.

== Accolades ==
- Honored Artist of the Uzbek SSR (1939)
- Stalin Prize 3rd class (1951)
- State Hamza Prize (1967)
- People's Writer of the Uzbek SSR (1972)
- Hero of Socialist Labor (27 September 1974)
- Three Orders of Lenin (18 March 1959; 16 January 1970; 27 September 1974)
- Order of the October Revolution (29 December 1979)
- Three Orders of the Red Banner of Labor (16 January 1950; 6 December 1951; 1 March 1965)
- Order of Friendship of Peoples (16 November 1984)
- Three Order of the Badge of Honor (31 May 1937; 24 March 1945; 11 January 1957)
- Medal "For Distinguished Labour" (25 December 1944)
