= Mirtemir =

- Born: Mirtemir Umarbekovich Tursunov; May 30, 1910; Village Ikan, Turkistan, Russian Turkestan
- Died: January 1978 (aged 67); Tashkent, Uzbek SSR
- Occupations: Poet and literary translator
- Writing career
- Notable awards: People's Poet of the Uzbek SSR (1971); State Berdaq Prize (1977); State Hamza Prize (1979); National Order of Merit (2001)

Mirtemir Tursunov (Uzbek: Mirtemir Tursunov, Миртемир Турсунов) (30 May 1910 — January 1978) most commonly known simply as Mirtemir, was an Uzbek poet and literary translator. In addition to writing his own poetry, Mirtemir translated the works of many famous foreign poets, such as Abai Qunanbaiuli, Aleksandr Pushkin, Heinrich Heine, Magtymguly Pyragy, Maxim Gorky, Mikhail Lermontov, Nâzım Hikmet, Nikolay Nekrasov, Pablo Neruda, Samad Vurgun, and Shota Rustaveli into the Uzbek language.

Mirtemir became a National Poet of the Uzbek SSR in 1971. He received many other awards for his works, including the State Berdaq Prize (1977) and the State Hamza Prize (1979). In 2002, Mirtemir was posthumously awarded the National Order of Merit (Uzbek: Buyuk xizmatlari uchun), one of independent Uzbekistan's most prestigious awards.

== Life and work ==
Mirtemir Umarbekovich Tursunov was born on May 30, 1910, in the village of Ikan, Turkistan. In 1932, Mirtemir graduated from the Pedagogical University of Samarkand with a degree in literature.

Mirtemir's first collection of poems, Shuʼlalar qoʻynida (Under the Lights) was published in 1928. His other collections of poetry include Zafar (Victory) (1929), Qaynashlarim (My Rages), Bong (The Clamor) (1932), and Poytaxt (The Capital) (1936).

Mirtemir translated the works of many famous foreign poets, such as Abai Qunanbaiuli, Aleksandr Pushkin, Berdaq, Heinrich Heine, Magtymguly Pyragy, Maxim Gorky, Mikhail Lermontov, Nâzım Hikmet, Nikolay Nekrasov, Pablo Neruda, Samad Vurgun, and Shota Rustaveli into Uzbek. In particular, he translated Who is Happy in Russia? of Nikolay Nekrasov and The Man in the Panther's Skin of Shota Rustaveli into Uzbek. He also translated the Kyrgyz epic poem Manas.

Mirtemir died in Tashkent in January 1978, at the age of 67.

== Awards ==
- People's Poet of the Uzbek SSR (1971)
- Order of the Red Banner of Labor
- Order of the Badge of Honor (18 March 1959)
- State Hamza Prize (1979)
- State Berdaq Prize (1977)
- Order of Outstanding Merit (22 August 2001)
