= Bahodir Yoʻldoshev =

Uzbek actor

Bahodir Tursunovich Yoldoshev
- Born: Bahodir Tursunovich Yoʻldoshev; September 7, 1945; Kattakurgan, Samarkand region, Uzbek SSR, USSR
- Died: May 16, 2021 (aged 75); Tashkent, Uzbekistan
- Occupations: actor, theater teacher,
- Years active: 1971-2003

Bahodir Tursunovich Yoldoshev (born September 7, 1945, Kattakurgan, Samarkand Region, Uzbek SSR - May 16, 2021) was an Uzbek and Soviet theater and film actor.

== Biography ==
He was born on September 7, 1945, in the city of Kattakurgan in the Samarkand Region of the Uzbek SSR, to the family of People's Artist of the Republic of Uzbekistan Shirin (Sorakhan) Melieva and actor Tursun Yuldashev. After completing the directing department of the Tashkent Theater and Art Institute in 1970, he interned at the Bolshoi Drama Theater (BDT) under Georgy Tovstonogov. Starting in 1970, he worked as a director at the Hamza Academic Theater in Uzbekistan. He had been associated with the theater since 1968 when he worked as a stage manager for six months while still a student, and then as a lighting technician.

In 1974, at the age of 28, he was appointed as the chief director of the theater.

In 1983, he established the Republican Satire Theater named after A. Kakhkhar, and became its artistic director.

From 1984, he worked as the chief director of the "Yosh Gvardiya" Theater (Young Guard), which was later renamed the A. Khidoyatov Theater and then the Uzbek Dramatic Theater named after Abror Khidoyatov. There, he directed plays such as "The Antics of Maysara" (Hamza), "Farmonbibi Got Offended" ("Farmonbibi Arazladi"), "The Secrets of the Parandja," "The Black Belt," "Iskander," "Firidun," "Nodirabegim," "The Silk Road". From 1992, he was the chief director and producer for the international music festival "Sharq Taronalari" on several occasions. In 1994, he participated as a director and producer in the celebrations for the 600th anniversary of the birth of Mirzo Ulugbek. In 1995, he directed the celebration of Nowruz, and in 1996, the 660th anniversary of the birth of Tamerlane. In 2009, he established the theater studio "Diydor," where many future masters of Uzbek art learned the foundations of theater arts. He continued to serve as its artistic director until his passing.

He died on May 16, 2021, at the age of 76.

== Filmography ==
He played many roles as an actor and there are dramatic works that have been staged:

- 1971 — "Kogda ostanovilas melnitsa" — Gaib
- 1977—1984 — TV series "Fiery Roads" — Alchinbek
- 1981 — "Vstrecha u vыsokix snegov" — Mukhtarov
- 1981 — "Zolotoye runo" — Kurkmas
- 1982 — "Perevorot po instruksii 107" — Investigator
- 1985 — "Dolgoye exo v gorax" — Umarkul
- 1986 — "Oxota na drakona" — Carlos
- 1986 — "Almazniy poyas" — Sherzod
- 1987 — "Gorech padeniya" — Usmanov
- 1989 — "Oxota na yedinoroga"
- 2003 — "Velikan i korotishka"

He also directed the comedy "Neputeviy muj" (1999—2000).

== Awards ==
- Honored Artist of the Uzbek SSR (1979)
- Honored Artist of Uzbekistan (1995)
- State Hamza Prize (1989)
- Order of Mehnat Shuhrati (1998)
- Order of Outstanding Merit (2019)
- Order For Selfless Services
- Order of Respect of the Country

== See also ==
Abror Hidoyatov
