= Oʻzbekiston Ovozi =

Oʻzbekiston ovozi
- Owner: Government
- Founded: 21 June 1918 (as Ishtirokiyun)
- Language: Uzbek language
- Headquarters: Tashkent
- Website: uzbekistonovozi.uz

Oʻzbekiston ovozi (Uzbek pronunciation: [ɵzˌbekɪsˈtɔn ʔɔʋɔˈzɪ]) or Voice of Uzbekistan is an Uzbek-language newspaper published in the Republic of Uzbekistan. It is run by the government and is a mouthpiece of the pro-government People's Democratic Party of Uzbekistan.

The name of the newspaper has been changed many times throughout history; it was originally founded in 1918 with the name Ishtirokiyun (The Communists), then was renamed to Qizil bayroq (Red Banner) in 1920, Turkiston (Turkistan) in 1922, Qizil Oʻzbekiston (Red Uzbekistan) in 1924, then Sovet Oʻzbekistoni (Soviet Uzbekistan) from 1964 to 1991.
