= Hamza Hakimzade Niyazi =

Uzbek playwright, poet and activist

- حمزہ حکیم زادہ نیازی; Ҳамза Ҳакимзода Ниёзий; Hamza Hakimzoda Niyoziy
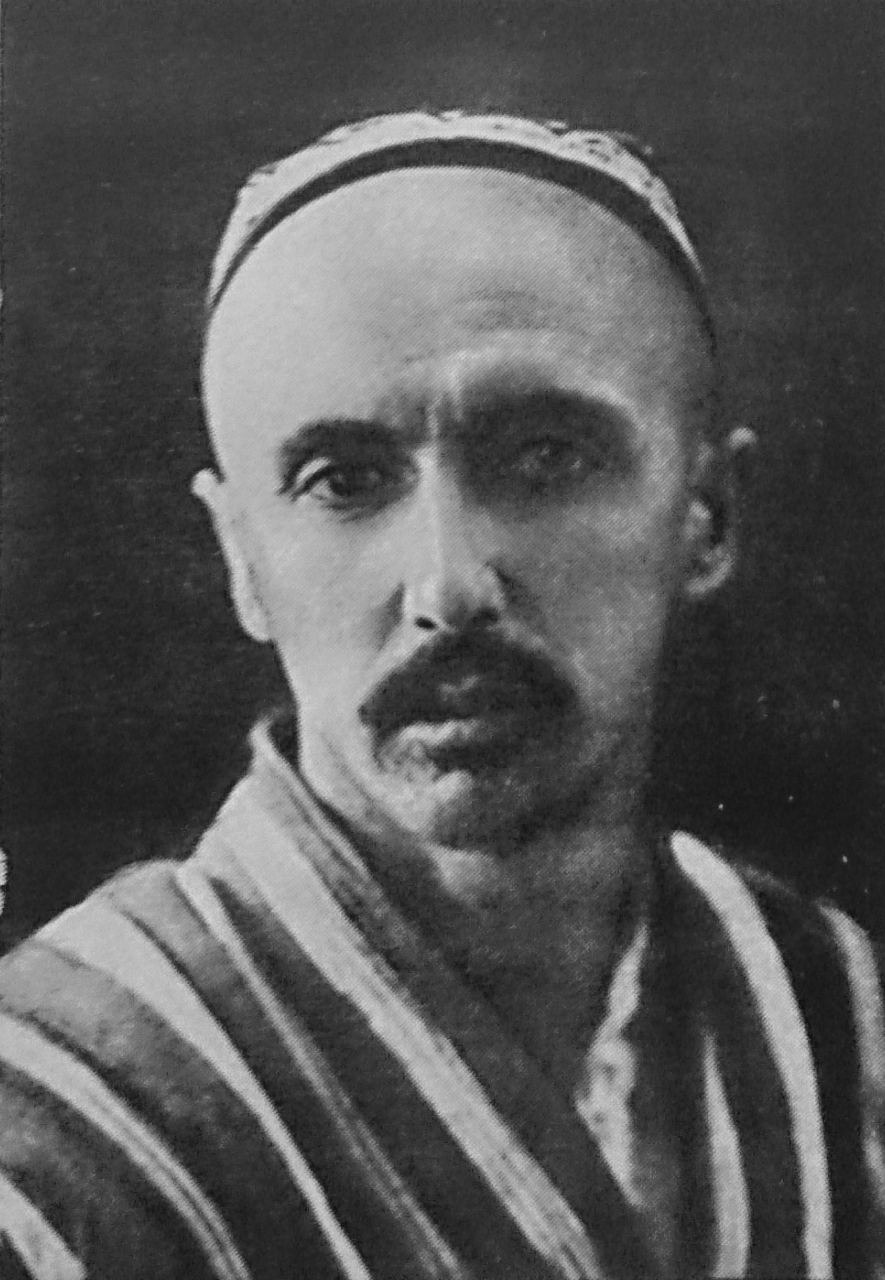
- Hamza Hakimzade Niyazi in the 1920s
- Born: 6 March [O.S. 22 February] 1889; Kokand, Russian Turkestan
- Died: 18 March 1929 (aged 40); Shohimardon, Uzbek SSR, Soviet Union
- Cause of death: stoned to death
- Occupations: author, composer, playwright, poet, scholar, and political activist
- Writing career
- Notable awards: People's Writer of the Uzbek SSR (1926)

Hamza Hakimzade Niyazi (Note: Uzbek: حمزہ حکیم زادہ نیازی, romanized: Hamza Hakimzoda Niyoziy, cyrillized: Ҳамза Ҳакимзода Ниёзий, IPA: [ɦɐmˈza ɦɐˌkɪmzɔˈda nijɔˈzi]) (6 March [O.S. 22 February] 1889 – 18 March 1929) was an Uzbek author, composer, playwright, poet, scholar, teacher, and political activist. Niyazi is widely seen as one of the leading figures in the early development of modern Uzbek literature. He is generally considered the first Uzbek playwright, the founder of modern Uzbek musical forms, as well as the founder of Uzbek social realism. During the Russian Revolution, he supported the Bolsheviks, as they strongly opposed the system of feudal rule that was prevalent in much of Central Asia. He was one of the first Uzbeks to join the Communist Party of the Soviet Union and dedicated his life to promoting literacy and education in his homeland, opening schools and orphanages.

Apart from Uzbek, Niyazi was fluent in several other languages, including Arabic, Persian, Russian, and Turkish. In addition to writing textbooks, non-fiction works, and newspaper articles, Hamza wrote plays, musicals, poetry, and novels. His prominent works include the novelette Yangi Saodat, the song Yasha, Shoʻro, and the poem memorializing honor killing victim Tursunoy Saidazimova as a martyr. His works generally dealt with social issues, such as women's rights, social inequality, and the prevalence of superstition.

Born to a devout Muslim family, he became an atheist over time, supporting measures to control religious fanaticism and superstition in Central Asia. Traveling village by village, he tried to help teach people to read the Uzbek language as well as discourage violence against women and superstitious practices and promoted the hujum by organizing rallies. Stationed in Shohimardon to help with the five-year plan, he knew that the shrine in Shohimardon to Ali was not the actual resting place of Ali and intended to remove it, as the local elites used it to extort the local peasants by demanding they pay alms to it. However, the local clergy was outraged by his activities of promoting the hujum and trying to educate the populace about the dubious nature of the shrine. Consequently, Hamza was stoned to death on 18 March 1929.

After his death, Hamza was hailed as a martyr in the struggle against feudalism and religious fanaticism. Streets, a station of the Tashkent metro (later renamed), the theater in Tashkent where he taught drama, and a literature prize were named in his honor. Statues built in his likeness were installed in numerous cities in the Uzbek SSR, and his character was the main protagonist in the 1961 movie Hamza and the 1970s TV series Fiery Roads. However, after independence, Hamza became significantly less revered, as his political views supportive of the Soviet Union and opposition to religious activities were seen as un-Uzbek and anti-Muslim, despite the fact that many of the customs he pushed to abolish were derived from pre-Islamic practices.

== Life ==
=== Early life ===
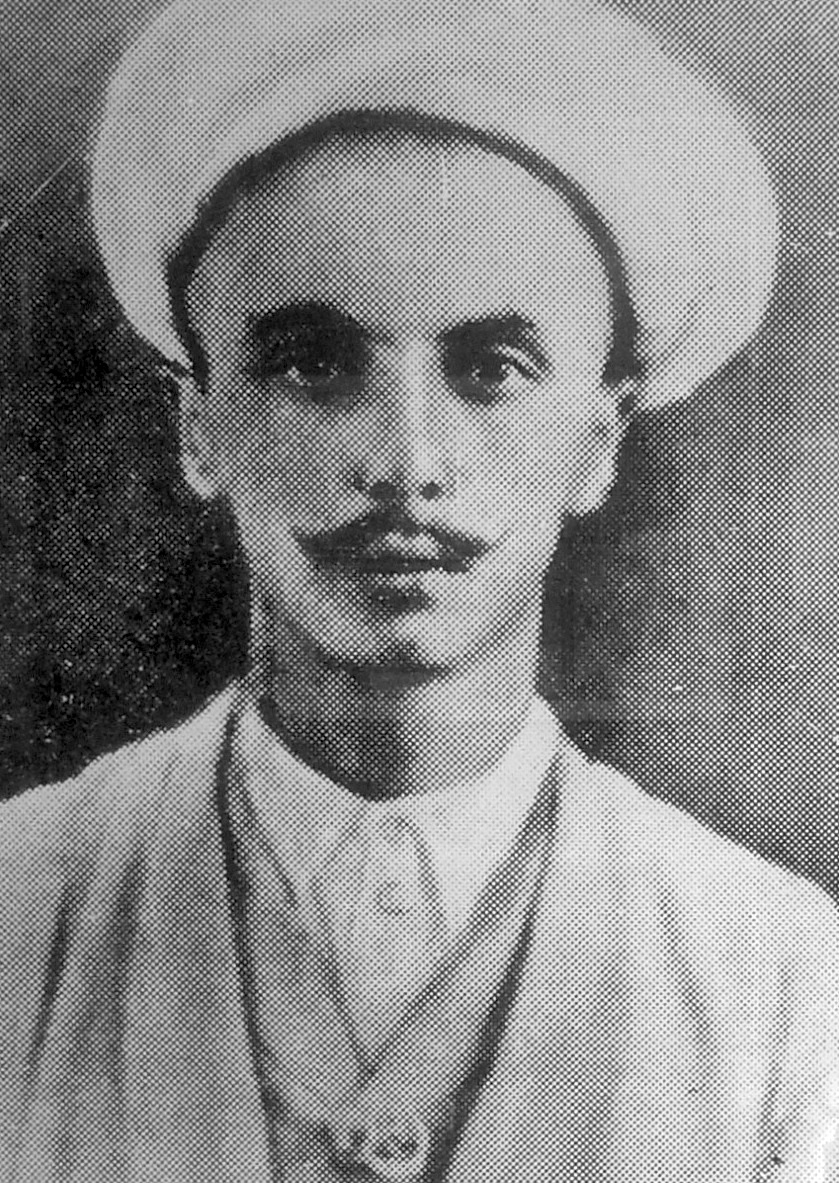
Niyazi in 1906

Hamza Hakimzade Niyazi was born to an Uzbek family on 6 March [O.S. 22 February] 1889 in Kokand, the youngest of four children. His father, Ibn Yamin Niyoz oʻgʻli (1840—1922), was a wealthy apothecary. His father was educated in Bukhara, fluent in Uzbek and Persian, had travelled to India and Xinjiang, but was very religious. His mother Jahonbibi was also very religious. As a child, Hamza started his education in a maktab, then attended a madrassah for seven years. However, as his family's wealth declined, he found work at a cotton mill. He started writing poetry at age 16, commenting on social issues facing Uzbeks, although he did not start publishing his poetry until much later. From around 1906 to 1907, Hamza was an avid reader of the Crimean Tatar newspaper Terciman, which inspired him to start questioning the social norms of Uzbek society and develop an interest in major social changes.

During Tsarist times, Hamza tried to promote education and founded secular schools for orphans and poor children to teach them how to read free of charge. However, he faced many setbacks, as local authorities would frequently try to close the schools. The school he opened in Kokand in 1911 was soon closed after the clergy accused him of promoting atheism, but he reopened it and went on to try to open schools in other towns such as Margilan. However, the local clergy was strongly opposed to the existence of secular schools and tried to stop the schools from functioning. Working as a teacher, he authored Uzbek-language primers and textbooks for children, such as Yengil adabiyot (Easy Literature) (1914), Oʻqish kitobi (Reading Book) (1914), and Qiroat kitobi (Reading with Intonation) (1915).

=== Post-revolution period ===
Niyazi ardently supported the Russian Revolution of 1917. He joined the Communist Party in 1920, becoming one of the first Uzbeks in the Party, and frequently engaged in Soviet politics. While Hamza wore Western-style clothes in 1915, he went back to wearing traditional Uzbek dress in 1920.

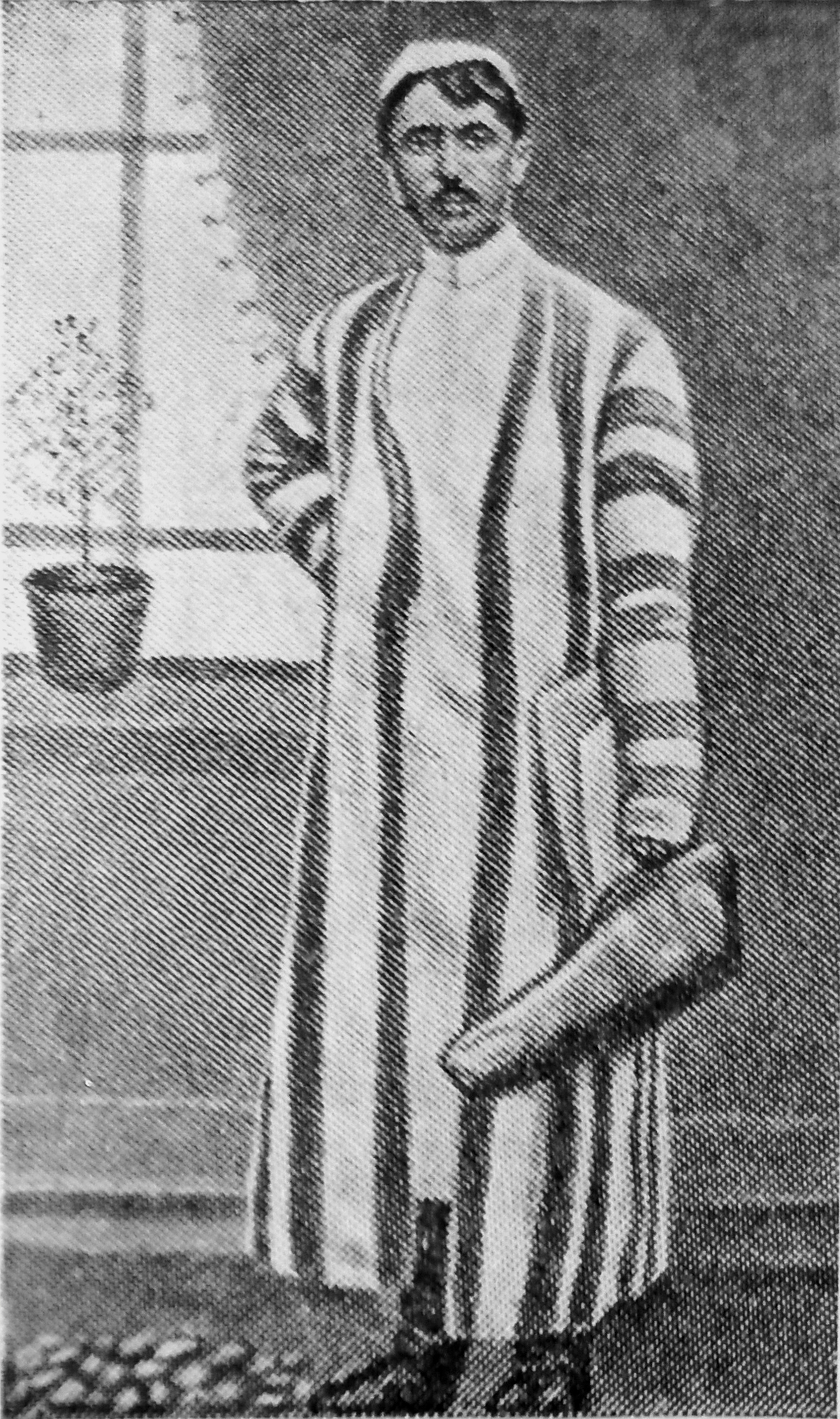
Niyazi in 1918

In the course of his work, Hamza often met with the Tajik writer Sadriddin Ayni, who was also an advocate of the Jadid movement before the revolution, later becoming a supporter of the Soviet Union.

In 1918, Hamza co-founded an Uzbek theater troupe along with Muhitdin Qoriyoqubov. He went on to work on founding other theater troupes, such as the Kokand troupe. For his work and contributions to Uzbek-Soviet literature, he was awarded the title People's Writer of the Uzbek SSR in 1926.

=== Marriages and children ===
In 1912, Hamza married his first wife was Aksinya (in some sources Zoya) Uvarova, a Russian woman who had worked as a nanny to a wealthy family in Kokand. Uvarova converted to Islam for their marriage to be legal and took the new name Zuhra. However, they did not stay together for long, as she and their son Gʻiyos fled to Tambov for their safety after being threatened by fanatics. The couple also had a daughter, but the girl died at a young age. Gʻiyos also died when he was only ten.

In 1923 (in some sources 1922), Hamza married Zaynab (Zina) Ahmadjonova (in some sources Fayzullina), with whom he had a son, Abbos. His second marriage was also short-lived. Abbos was killed in action during World War II in Karachevsky District, then part of Oryol Oblast, Russian SFSR.

=== Travels ===
Hamza worked as a scribe in the office of Obidjon Mahmudov, one of the early Uzbek Jadids, before moving to Bukhara in 1910 to improve his Arabic language skills. He soon left the city and briefly worked in a printing press office in Kogon before moving to Tashkent, where he became acquainted with Jadid-style schools. Although his parents wanted him to become a mullah, he chose a more secular path, gaining interest in the Jadid movement and eventually communism.

Hamza first visited Samarkand in 1909 and also visited Turkmenistan in his travels.

After getting significant pushback from the clergy for his activities, Hamza performed the Hajj in February 1913, which somewhat improved his standing with local religious figures. On the journey he travelled to Mecca via Afghanistan and India before boarding a ship to Arabia, and then visiting Lebanon, Syria, Turkey, and Ukraine before finally returning to Central Asia. What he saw in his travels further made him question local customs and beliefs. For instance, at the time electric lighting in mosques was accepted in Arab Muslim countries but even kerosene lamps were frowned upon as too modern in Bukhara.

=== Later years and death ===
In August 1928, Hamza dropped out of the music school where he was studying to move to Shohimardon to assist with the implementation of the five-year plan. Shohimardon was a very conservative village, home to a shrine that local legend claimed to be the tomb of Ali, which made the village a place of pilgrimage, although there is a strong consensus among Muslim scholars that Ali was not buried in Shohimardon. The shrine was protected by dozens of caretakers and clergy. Yuldash Akhunbabaev and other Uzbek politicians were well aware of the dubious nature of the shrine and wanted to convert it into a resort, and chose Hamza to lead the initiative of educating the populace about the nature of the shrine as part of his work to implement the five-year plan. Before his death, Hamza opened a school, a teahouse, organized a collective, had a monument to Vladimir Lenin installed, and gave a fiery speech at a veil-burning ceremony he organized in celebration of International Women's Day on 8 March, much to the outrage of the local clergy.

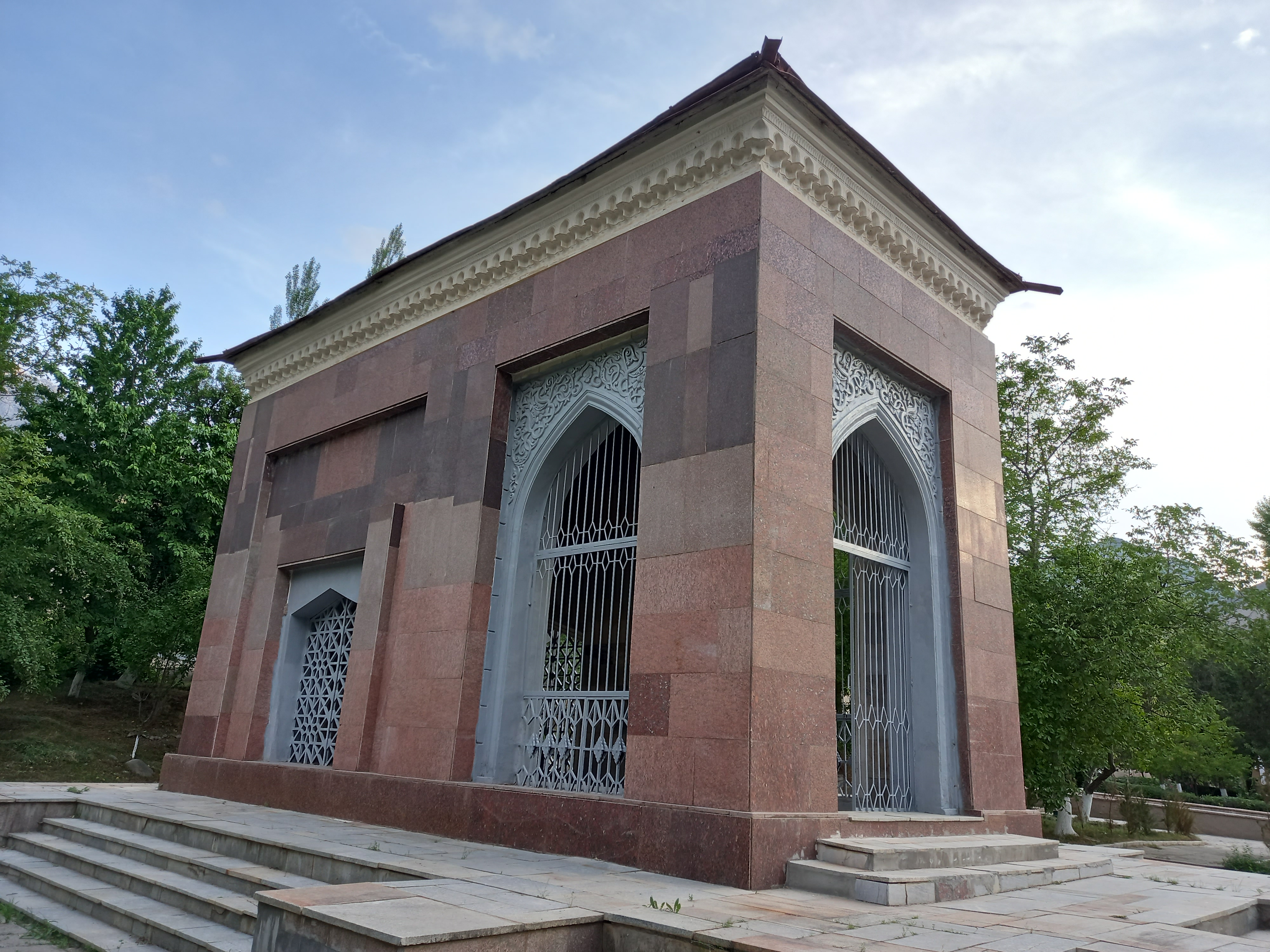
Niyazi's mausoleum in Shohimardon

On 18 March 1929, while leading a group to try to dismantle the shrine in Shohimardon, Hamza was stoned to death by an angry crowd of villagers. Five people were executed for the murder of Hamza. After he was murdered, the government destroyed the fake shrine to Ali that he had tried to disassemble, but soon local villagers tried to rebuild it. It was demolished in 1940, and the government replaced it with a museum of atheism. A museum dedicated to Hamza was built in the area in 1952.

Although Hamza was initially buried in a garden near where he was killed, his remains were moved ten years later to a mausoleum near a memorial for fallen Red Army soldiers.

== Works ==
Niyazi's early writings exhibit sharp condemnations of social injustice. His works generally dealt wish social issues, such as women's rights, social inequality, and the prevalence of superstition. He wrote his earliest poems under the pen name Nihoniy. His earliest collection of poems, Devoni Nihoniy (Nihoniy's Diwan), was found in 1949 and had 197 poems that he had written from 1903 to 1904.

His first major work, the novelette Yangi saodat (New Happiness) (1915), extols the benefits of education through a Jadid lens, where the main protagonists seek out education and enjoy the benefits of literacy in the setting of a feudal society, but credit the lack of education in society to a shortage of schools, not religion itself. Hamza said that the purpose of the book was to provide a source of fiction literature that did not promote superstition.

In Zaharli hayot yoxud Ishq qurbonlari (Poisonous Life or the Victims of Love), published in 1916, he portrays a young couple, the 18-year-old son of a well-to-do family and the 17-year-old daughter of a craftsman. The couple's love is thwarted by the inflexible attitudes of the boy's parents who stick closely to their rigid ideas about social structure. The young people eventually commit suicide — they become victims of the feudal class system.

Niyazi also wrote Boy ila xizmatchi (The Bey and The Servant) in 1918 which deals primarily with the revolutionary upheaval in Western Turkestan and with the institution of arranged marriage. In the story, the young heroine commits suicide after being forced to marry a man she does not love. Much of the text was lost, but was later reworked by Komil Yashin.

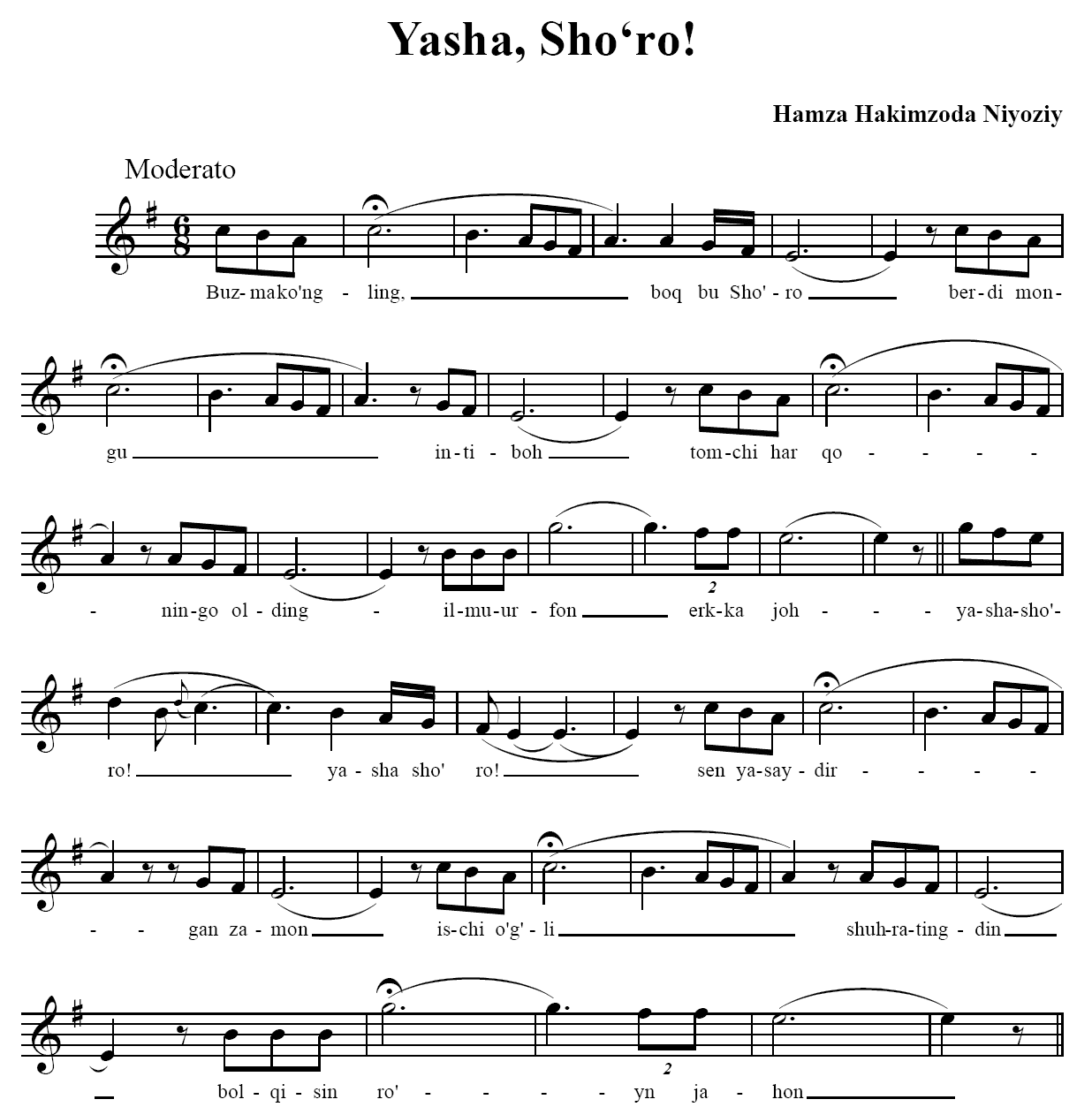
"Yasha, Shoʻro!" ("Hail to the Soviets!") — an Uzbek folk song composed and written by Niyazi

One of his final works was Paranji sirlaridan bir lavha Yoki yallachilar ishi (One Episode from the Secrets of the Veil or the Case of Yalla Singers) (written in 1927), which describes cruelty Uzbek woman faced at the hands of religious authorities and their mahrams. Less than a year before his death, Hamza wrote the poem "Тursunoy marsiyasi" honoring singer and honor killing victim Tursunoy Saidazimova.

In addition to his explicitly political novels, Hamza is also known for his anthologies of folk songs and melodies, and wrote folksongs promoting the revolution. He also wrote two comedies: Tuhmatchilar jazosi (The Punishment of Slanderers) in 1918 and Burungi qozilar yoxud Maysaraning ishi (Old Judges or the Case of Maysara) in 1926.

Niyazi also participated in the controversial Uzbek language reforms of the 1920s which were meant to codify a literary Uzbek language in place of the older, fading Chagatai. Chagatai had been the dominant written form for several centuries. The reforms eventually resulted in a significant shift in spelling and pronunciation.

Hamza's complete works were published twice during the Soviet period. The four-volume Hamza Hakimzoda Niyoziy. Mukammal asarlar toʻplami (Uzbek: Ҳамза Ҳакимзода Ниёзий. Мукаммал асарлар тўплами) edited by Komil Yashin et al. was published in 1981. The five-volume Hamza Hakimzoda Niyoziy. Toʻla asarlar toʻplami (Uzbek: Ҳамза Ҳакимзода Ниёзий. Тўла асарлар тўплами) edited by Naim Karimov et al. was published in 1989.

== Political views ==
By the time of the October Revolution, Hamza was strongly supportive of the communist cause, and saw communism as the only path to modernization. It is widely recognized that he was one of the first Uzbeks to profess support of communism, and he came to be described as the "singer of the revolution" and a wholehearted supporter of it.

He extolled the Russian Revolution and was directly connected with the struggle for social justice and liberation in Uzbekistan. Many of Niyazi's works, including his poems, dramas, and other writings were often written in the turmoil of revolution and describe his view of the awakening of Uzbek class consciousness. Niyazi's novels are generally moralistic and focus on showcasing and condemning those aspects of Uzbek society the author considered backward and detrimental to both individual and national development.

Some Uzbek emigrees view Hamza negatively, considering him a "reformed jadid". However, some of Hamza's works were changed over time during the Soviet era to reduce emphasis on Jadid themes.

== Religious views ==
While widely considered to have been an atheist in his later years, Hamza was initially a Jadid Muslim, arguing in favor of reform of religion as opposed to control of it. Hamza's social commentaries focused on the backwardness of society of the time and the need for better education and modernization, and pointed out the major differences in Islam as practiced by Central Asians compared to the beliefs of Turks and Arabs. However, over time he grew much more radical and secular, outwardly condemning the clergy for using their power to exploit the poor through fear. Distancing himself from Jadid positions in favor of a Leninist worldview, he eventually became the head of the Uzbek Society of the Godless (Xudosizlar jamiyati), part of the Soviet Society of Atheists.

== Legacy ==
After Hamza's death, the government tried to rename Shohimardon to Hamzobod, but the name never gained much traction. Statues of him were erected throughout the Uzbek SSR. To honor his memory, in 1967 the Central Committee of the Communist Party of Uzbekistan established the State Hamza Prize to recognize outstanding achievement in literature, arts, and architecture. Many institutions in Uzbekistan, including a station of Tashkent Metro (renamed in 2015), the Uzbek State Academic Drama Theater, as well as schools, clubs, farms and streets were named after him. In 1989, a Soviet coin featuring an image of Hamza was issued in honor of his 100th birthday.

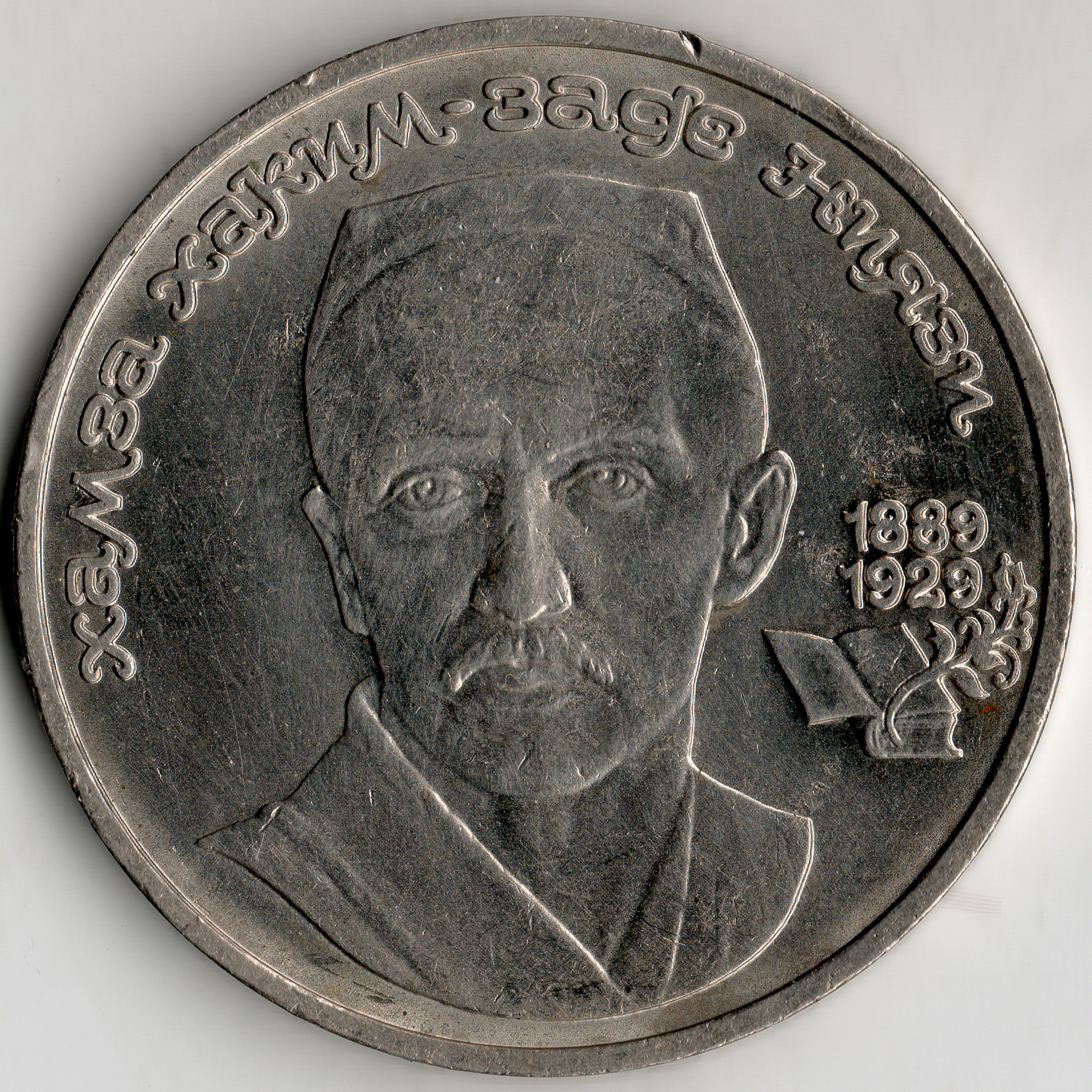
Niyazi on a 1989 Soviet commemorative coin

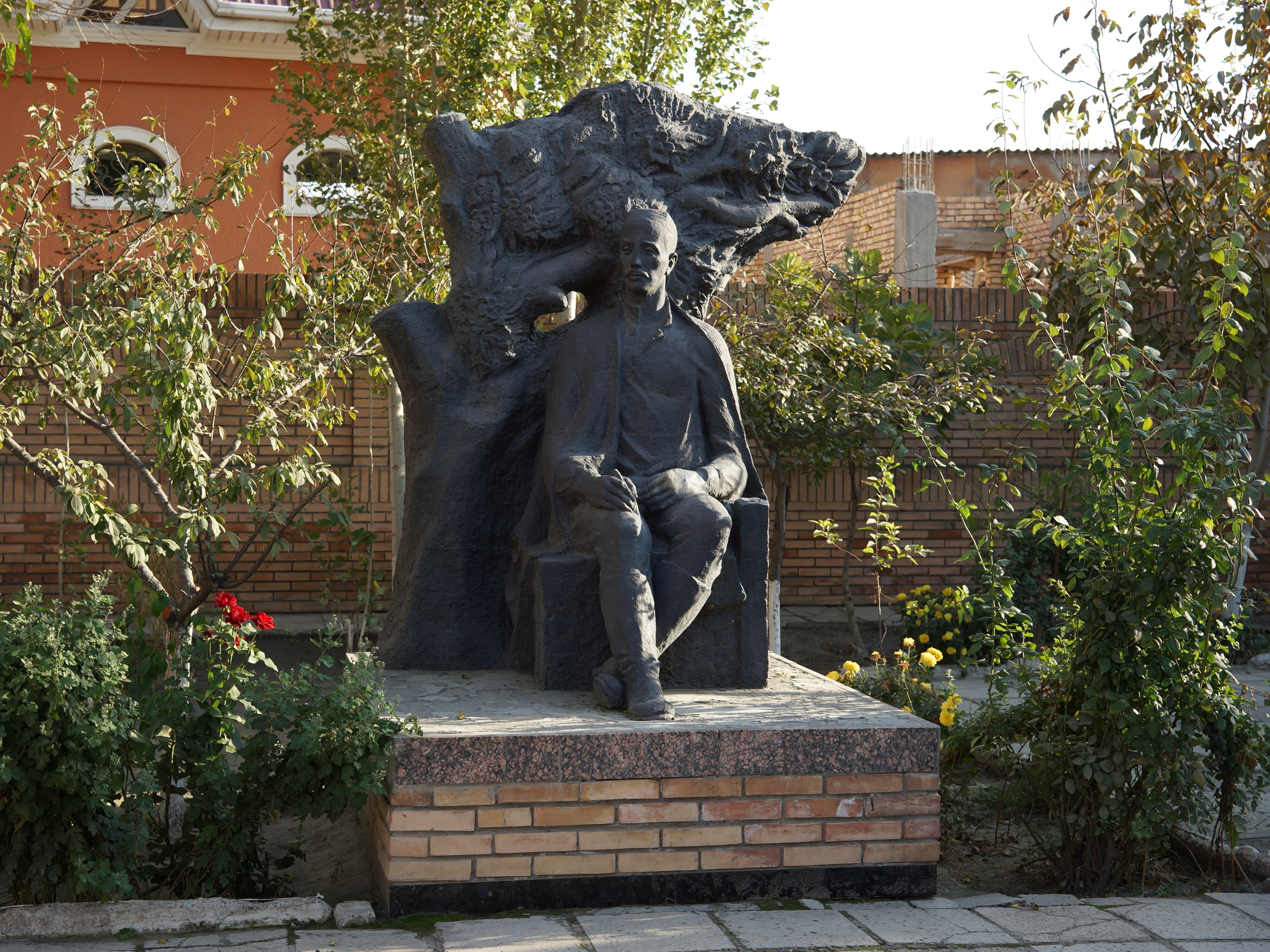
Monument to Hamza Hakimzade Niyazi in the courtyard of the poet's House-Museum in Kokand

Hamid Olimjon wrote the poem Shohimardon to commemorate Hamza. Hamza is depicted as the main protagonist in the 1960 film Hamza directed by Zagid Sabitov, where he was played by Olim Xoʻjayev and later in the TV series Fiery Roads, where he was played by Oʻlmas Alixoʻjayev. Komil Yashin, who frequently wrote about Hamza in Soviet newspapers and contributed to writing the script for Fiery Roads, also wrote a two-volume novel about him, with the first volume being published in 1979 and the second in 1980. In his 1998 book The Politics of Muslim Cultural Reform: Jadidism in Central Asia, Adeeb Khalid, whose research focuses on Central Asian history, wrote that it is difficult to imagine the history of modern Central Asian literature without Niyazi.

Edward A. Allworth postulated that Hamza was more useful to the Soviets in death, since his death contributed to the story of a Soviet martyr. Some even went as far as to claim that Hamza would have been killed during Great Purge if he had not been stoned to death in 1929. However, Soviet academics vehemently rejected this, pointing out the work Hamza did while he was alive to promote social advancement. Many former Jadids that Hamza worked closely with, such as Sadriddin Ayni, outlived Joseph Stalin.

Although Hamza held folk hero status in the Uzbek SSR, he has been significantly less celebrated in independent Uzbekistan. Many things named in his honor in the Soviet era have since been renamed. Shortly after Uzbekistan became independent in 1991, the State Hamza Prize was discontinued. In 2001, the State Drama Theater named after Hamza was renamed to omit his name. In 2015, the metro station in Tashkent named after him was renamed to Novza.

== See also ==
- Chagatai language
- Jadidism
- Uzbek language

== Bibliography ==
- Adle, Chahryar (2005). History of Civilizations of Central Asia: Towards the contemporary period : from the mid-nineteenth to the end of the twentieth century. UNESCO. ISBN 978-92-3-103985-0.
- Allworth, Edward (1964), Uzbek Literary Politics, The Hague: Mouton & Co.
- Allworth, Edward (1994), Central Asia, 130 Years of Russian Dominance, Durham: Duke University Press, ISBN 978-0-8223-1521-6
- Allworth, Edward (1990), The Modern Uzbeks: From the Fourteenth Century to the Present: A Cultural History, Stanford: Hoover Institution Press, ISBN 978-0-8179-8732-9
- Kasymov, S. S. (1956), 'Узбекская Социалистическая Советская Республика in Great Soviet Encyclopedia. Volume XIII. (in Russian), The Hague: Literatura.
- Beliaev, Viktor M. (1975), Slobin, Mark (ed.), Central Asian Music. Essays in the History of the Music of the Peoples of the USSR, Middletown: Wesleyan University Press.
- Kamp, Marianne (2011), The New Women in Uzbekistan. Islam, Modernity, and Unveiling under Communism, Seattle - London: University of Washington Press, ISBN 978-0-295-98644-9.
- Khalid, Adeeb (1998), The Politics of Muslim Cultural Reform. Jadidism in Central Asia, Berkeley, LA - London: University of Washington Press, ISBN 0-520-21356-4
- Khalid, Adeeb (1999). The Politics of Muslim Cultural Reform: Jadidism in Central Asia. University of California Press. ISBN 978-0-520-92089-7.
- Khalid, Adeeb (2015). Making Uzbekistan: Nation, Empire, and Revolution in the Early USSR. Cornell University Press. ISBN 978-1-5017-0134-4.
- Klein Michel, Sigrid (1993), Aufbruch aus orientalischen Dichtungstraditionen Studien zur usbekischen Dramatik und Prosa zwischen 1910 und 1934 [Departure from Oriental poetry traditions. Studies of Uzbek drama and prose from 1910 to 1934] (in German), Budapest: Akadémiai Kiadó, ISBN 963-05-6316-9
- MacFadyen, David (2006), Russian culture in Uzbekistan, London: Routledge, ISBN 978-0-415-34134-9
- Malcolmson, Scott (1995), Empire's Edge: Travels in South-Eastern Europe, Turkey and Central Asia, London: Verso, ISBN 978-1-85984-098-6
- Niyoziy, Hamza Hakimzoda (1988–1989), Karimov, N. (ed.), Hamza Hakimzoda Niyoziy: Toʻla asarlar toʻplami (in Uzbek), Tashkent: Fan.
- Northrop, Douglas (2016). An Imperial World: Empires and Colonies Since 1750. Routledge. ISBN 978-1-315-50815-3.
- Soucek, Svatopluk (2000), A History of Inner Asia, Cambridge: Cambridge University Press, ISBN 978-0-521-65704-4
- Weber, Harry Butler; Gutsche, George J.; Rollberg, P. (1977). The Modern Encyclopedia of East Slavic, Baltic, and Eurasian Literatures. Academic International Press. ISBN 978-0-87569-038-4.
- Witkowitsch, Viktor (1954), A Journey Through Soviet Uzbekistan, Moscow: Foreign Languages Press, ISBN 978-0-521-65704-4
- Ниёзий, Ҳамза Ҳакимзода (1989), Ҳамза Ҳакимзода. Тўла асарлар тўплами, vol. 5, Tashkent: Фан, ISBN 5-648-00450-8

=== Further reading ===
- Abdulla, Sobir (9 March 1969). "Устоз". Sovet Oʻzbekistoni (in Uzbek). p. 3.
- Adamovich, V. (4 October 1949). "В Хамза-Абаде". Pravda Vostoka (in Russian). p. 2. Archived from the original on 19 January 2025.
- Akbarov, Ilyos (6 March 1964). "Мангу қушиқлар". Qizil Oʻzbekiston (in Uzbek). p. 3.
- Akbarov, K. (19 March 1954). "Страстный борец за раскрепощение женщин". Pravda Vostoka (in Russian). p. 3. Archived from the original on 19 January 2025.
- Bozorov, Ubaydulla (10 March 1989). "Қўлга қизил туғ олиб". Oʻzbekiston adabiyoti va sanʼati (in Uzbek). p. 3.
- Hamroyev, Razzoq (1969). "Режиссёр". Guliston (in Uzbek) (10): 9.
- Ibrohimova, R. (12 March 1986). "Ёдгор". Sovet Oʻzbekistoni (in Uzbek). p. 3.
- Jalilov, Toʻxtasin (4 October 1949). "Огромно было его влияние на молодежь". Pravda Vostoka (in Russian). p. 2. Archived from the original on 19 January 2025.
- Karomatov, Fayzulla (1969). "Бастакор". Guliston (in Uzbek) (10): 8.
- Kerbabayev, Berdi (1969). "Ҳамза қардошлар ҳаётида". Guliston (in Uzbek) (10): 9.
- Kostyrya, Vyacheslav (1970). "Пламенный Хамза". Ogonyok (in Russian) (51): 25.
- Mahkamova, M. (19 May 1989). "Ҳамза ва замона". Oʻzbekiston adabiyoti va sanʼati (in Uzbek). p. 7. Archived from the original on 19 January 2025.
- Mamajonov, Salohiddin (12 March 1986). "Унутилмас Уйғунлик". Sovet Oʻzbekistoni (in Uzbek). p. 3.
- Medvedev, Feliks (1979). "Нестовый Хамза". Ogonyok (11): 8.
- Miroqilov, Mirshohid; Kuznetsova, Mariya (4 October 1949). "Наш первый режиссер и учитель". Pravda Vostoka (in Russian). p. 2. Archived from the original on 19 January 2025.
- Mirtursunov, Z. (1969). "Педагог". Guliston (in Uzbek) (10): 8–9.
- Moʻminov, Gʻafur (6 March 1964). "Шеърият новатори". Qizil Oʻzbekiston (in Uzbek). p. 3.
- Nishonov, Rafiq (23 May 1989). "Уроки Хамзы". Pravda Vostoka (in Russian). p. 4. Archived from the original on 19 January 2025.
- Qayumov, Laziz (1969). "Адабиё тимиз ялов бардори". Guliston (in Uzbek) (3): 8.
- Qodirov, Muhammadjon (19 May 1989). "Халқнинг овози". Oʻzbekiston adabiyoti va sanʼati (in Uzbek). p. 5. Archived from the original on 19 January 2025.
- Qoraboyev, Usmonjon; Mahmudova, Klara (16 March 1989). "Шарқ кечалари". Oʻzbekiston adabiyoti va sanʼati (in Uzbek). p. 5. Archived from the original on 19 January 2025.
- Sultonov, I. (19 June 1960). "Хамза и современность". Pravda Vostoka (in Russian). p. 3.
- Sultonov, Yusuf (19 March 1954). "Основоположник узбекской советской литературы". Pravda Vostoka (in Russian). p. 3. Archived from the original on 19 January 2025.
- Sultonov, Yusuf (6 March 1964). "Куйчи ва курашчи". Qizil Oʻzbekiston (in Uzbek). p. 3.
- Sultonov, Yusuf (5 March 1989). "Служение народу". Pravda Vostoka (in Russian). pp. 1, 3. Archived from the original on 19 January 2025.
- Vohidov, Sodirxon (19 May 1989). "Мусиқавий тафаккур". Oʻzbekiston adabiyoti va sanʼati (in Uzbek). p. 5. Archived from the original on 19 January 2025.
- Xolliyev, Nurmuhammad (16 March 1990). "Ҳамза: Ўтмиш эмас, истиқбол". Oʻzbekiston adabiyoti va sanʼati (in Uzbek). p. 3.
- Xudoyberdieva, M. (12 March 1986). "Илмий сессия ва конференция". Sovet Oʻzbekistoni (in Uzbek). p. 3.
- Yashin, Komil (4 October 1949). "Выдающийся деятель узбекской советской культуры". Pravda Vostoka (in Russian). p. 2. Archived from the original on 19 January 2025.
- Yashin, Komil (1969). "Драматург". Guliston (in Uzbek) (10): 4–5.
- Yashin, Komil (6 March 1964). "Хамза с нами! К 75-летию поэта, патриота, гражданина". Pravda Vostoka (in Russian). p. 3. Archived from the original on 19 January 2025.
- Yashin, Komil (19 May 1989). "Шоирнинг тўйи - элнинг тўйи". Oʻzbekiston adabiyoti va sanʼati (in Uzbek). p. 1. Archived from the original on 19 January 2025.
- "Он был первым". Ogonyok (in Russian) (12): 2. 1964.
- "Революциянинг оташин жарчисига бағишлаб". Oʻzbekiston adabiyoti va sanʼati (in Uzbek). 17 March 1989. p. 1.
- "Убийцы Хаким-заде перед судом". Pravda Vostoka (in Russian). 30 May 1929. p. 3.
