= Halima Nosirova =

Soviet opera singer

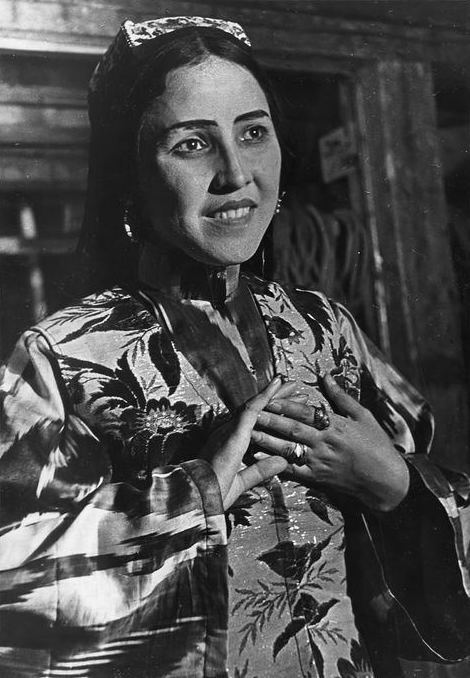

Background information
- Born: Ҳалима Носирова; December 29, 1913; Taglyk, Fergana Oblast, Russian Empire
- Died: January 3, 2003 (aged 89) Tashkent, Uzbekistan
- Genres: Opera, drama
- Occupations: Singer, actress
- Years active: 1929—1986

Halima Nosirova or Halima Nasyrova (Uzbek: Halima Nosirova, Ҳалима Носирова; Russian: Халима Насырова, Khalima Nasyrova) was a Soviet and Uzbek singer of Uzbek music. She also started her creative activities as a drama actress in 1927 and was a popular artist of the USSR.

== Biography ==
She was born on December 29, 1913 (according to other sources, December 7, 1912) in the village of Taglyk, near Kokand (now in the Fergana Region of Uzbekistan). She was the ninth child in the family and was raised in an orphanage.

From 1924 to 1927, she studied at the Baku Theater Technical College (now the Azerbaijan State University of Culture and Arts) along with a group of young people from Uzbekistan. From 1934 to 1937, she studied at the Uzbek Opera Studio of the Moscow Conservatory. Starting in 1927, she was an actress in the Central State Uzbek Theater in Samarkand (from 1929, the State Uzbek Drama Theater named after Hamza in Tashkent, and from 2001, the Uzbek National Academic Drama Theater).

From 1930 to 1986, she was a soloist in the Uzbek Music and Drama Theater (from 1939, the State Uzbek Opera and Ballet Theater, now the Navoi Theater) in Tashkent. She became a leading soloist in 1939. She performed in both classical repertoire and Uzbek national operas. She also performed as a concert singer, singing Uzbek folk songs as well as songs from other nations, including Tajik, Kazakh, Armenian, Azerbaijani, Chinese, Russian, Ukrainian, and others.

She toured abroad, including in East Germany, China, India, Indonesia, Iran, and other countries. From 1979 to 1986, she taught at the Department of Eastern Music at the Tashkent Conservatory. She was a deputy of the 5th convocation of the Supreme Soviet of the USSR.

She died on January 3, 2003, in Tashkent, and was buried in the Chigatay Cemetery.

== Creative work ==
During her career, Nasirova played many roles and participated in parties and films:

=== Roles ===
- "The Government Inspector" by N. Gogol - Maria Antonovna
- "Turandot (Gozzi)" by K. Gozzi - Adelma
- "Arshin Mal Alan" by U. Hajibekov - Gyulchohra
- "Ichkarida" by M. Mukhamedov and K. Yashen - Gyulsara
- "Farhad and Shirin" by V. Uspensky - Shirin
- "Xalima" by G. Zafari - Khalima

== Parties ==
- 1939 - "Buran" by M. A. Ashrafi and S. N. Vasilenko - Nargyul
- 1940 - "Leyli and Majnun" by T. S. Sadykov and R. M. Glière - Leyli
- 1942 - "Ulugbek" by A. F. Kozlovsky - Sin Dun-fan
- 1944 - "Carmen" by G. Bizet - Carmen
- 1949 - "Gyulsara" by T. S. Sadykov and R. M. Glière - Gyulsara
- 1949 - "Taxir i Zuxra" by T. Jaliilov and B. Brovtsyn - Zuhra
- 1962 - "Hamza" by S. Babaev - Saodat
- "Prodelki Maysari" by S. A. Yudakov - Maysara
- "Zaynab i Omon" by B. I. Zeydman, T. S. Sadykov, Yu. Radzhaby, D. Zakirov - Zaynab
- "Pesnya Xorezma" by M. Yusupov - Bakhor
- "Vozvrasheniye" by Ya. R. Sabzanov - Khatidzhe-khanum

== Filmography ==
- 1940 - "Asal" - Asal
- 1943 - "Podarok Rodini" (musical film)
- 1944 - "Konsert pyati respublik" (musical film)
- 1958 - "Maftuningman" - Cameo
- 1960s - "Halima Nasyrova" (documentary)

== Honours and awards ==
- People's Artist of the USSR (31 May 1937)
- Two Orders of the Red Banner of Labour (31 May 1937, 18 March 1959)
- Four Orders of the Badge of Honour (1939, 1944, 1957, 1965)
- Two Stalin Prizes:
  - Stalin Prize 2nd class (1942) — for performing the title role in the opera "Leyli and Majnun" by U. Hajibeyov,
  - Stalin Prize 3rd class (1951) — for performing the title role in the opera "Gulsara" by T. S. Sodiqov and R. M. Glière)
- Two Orders of Lenin (16 January 1950, 6 December 1951)
- State Hamza Prize (1968)
- Order of the October Revolution (29 September 1973)
- Order of Friendship of Peoples (16 January 1984)
- Order of Outstanding Merit (28 August 2000)
- Jubilee Medal "In Commemoration of the 100th Anniversary of the Birth of Vladimir Ilyich Lenin"
- Medal "For Valiant Labour in the Great Patriotic War 1941–1945"

== Publications ==
- Солнце над Востоком. Записки актрисы. М., 1962. (in Russian)
- Мен ўзбек қизиман. Т., 1968. (in Uzbek)

== Literature ==
- НАСЫ́РОВА ХАЛИМА́ // Большая Российская Энциклопедия
- Саидов А. Х. Насырова. Таш., 1974
- Юлдашбаева Т.А. Х. Насырова. Таш., 1971; она же. Певцы узбекского оперного театра. Таш., 1985
- Франк Е.В. Х. Насырова. М.; Л., 1950
