= Sobir Abdulla =

Uzbek writer (1905–1972)

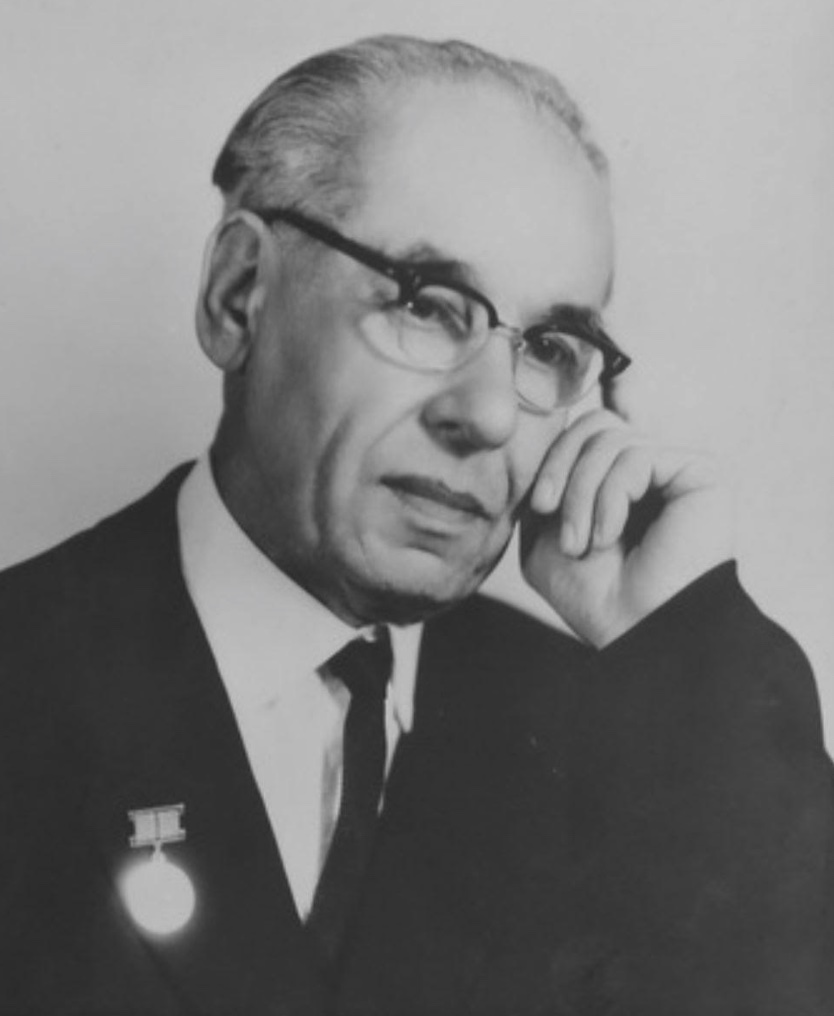
- Born: Sobir Abdullayev; 18 September [O.S. 5 September] 1905; Kokand, Fergana Oblast, Russian Empire
- Died: October 24, 1972 (aged 66); Tashkent, Uzbekistan
- Occupations: Writer; poet; playwright; literary translator
- Writing career
- Notable awards: Order of the Red Banner of Labour (1959); People's Poet of the Uzbek SSR (1965); State Hamza Prize (1971)
- Literary movement: Socialist realism

Sobir Abdullayev, known by the name Sobir Abdulla, (Note: Uzbek: Sobir Abdulla, Собир Абдулла; Russian: Cабир Абдулла, romanized: Sabir Abdulla.) (18 September [O.S. 5 September] 1905 – 24 October 1972) was an Uzbek-Soviet writer, poet, playwright, and literary translator. Abdulla received many prestigious awards for his works, including the State Hamza Prize and the titles Honored Artist of the Uzbek SSR and the People's Poet of the Uzbek SSR.

== Life ==
Sobir Abdullayev was born on 18 September [O.S. 5 September] 1905 in Kokand to an Uzbek family. He received his primary education from an Islamic school and then attended a secular Soviet school.

Abdulla became a member of the Communist Party in 1945. He died on 24 October 1972 in Tashkent.

== Work ==
From 1925 to 1948, Abdulla worked at the editorial offices of various periodical publishers in the Uzbek SSR. His first poetry collections were published in the 1930s, starting with Erk ilhomlari (Inspiration of Freedom) in 1931 and followed by works such as Koʻklam naʼrasi (The Cry of Spring) published in 1932 and Gulshan (Flower Garden) published in 1939. He also wrote story collections, such as Ulfat (Friendship), which was published in 1937.

Abdulla went on to experiment with other genres, writing the script for the drama Tohir and Zuhra and later a movie and an opera based on the same story. Over his career, he wrote numerous other prose works.

== Awards and accolades ==
- Honored Worker of Art of the Uzbek SSR (1944)
- People's Poet of the Uzbek SSR (6 September 1965)
- State Hamza Prize (November 1971)
- Order of the Red Banner of Labour (18 March 1959)
- two Orders of the Badge of Honour (31 January 1939 and 16 January 1950)
