= State Hamza Prize =

Former Soviet-era Uzbek award

State Prize of the Uzbek SSR Named After Hamza
- Uzbek: Hamza nomidagi Oʻzbekiston SSR Davlat mukofoti / Ҳамза номидаги Ўзбекистон ССР Давлат мукофоти
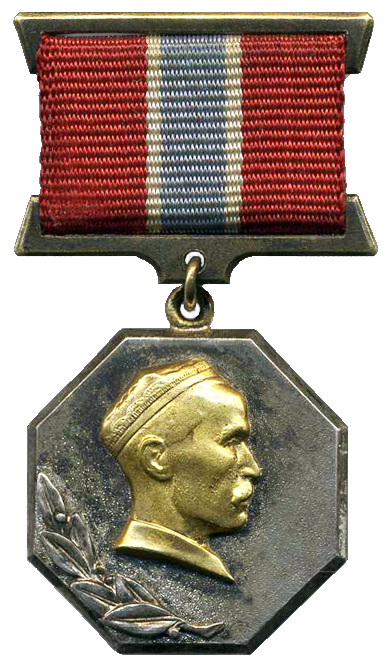
- Awarded for: outstanding achievement in literature, arts, and architecture
- Date: 1964–1991
- Country: Uzbek SSR
- Related: Alisher Navoiy State Prize

The State Hamza Prize or simply the Hamza Prize, officially the State Prize of the Uzbek SSR Named After Hamza (Uzbek: Hamza nomidagi Oʻzbekiston SSR Davlat mukofoti, Ҳамза номидаги Ўзбекистон ССР Давлат мукофоти; Russian: Государственная премия Узбекской ССР имени Хамзы) was a state prize established in the Uzbek SSR in 1964 to recognize outstanding achievement in literature, arts, and architecture. The prize was named in honor of Hamza Hakimzade Niyazi, an early pioneer of literature in the Uzbek SSR.

== Background ==
The award was established in 1964. In later years, the prize was awarded on 27 October, the date of the establishment of the Uzbek SSR. The medal was to be worn on the right side.

The prize was discontinued after Uzbekistan gained independence in 1991. The State Prizes of the Republic of Uzbekistan in the Field of Science and Technology, Literature, Art, and Architecture (Uzbek: Oʻzbekiston Respublikasining fan va texnika, adabiyot, sanʼat va meʼmorchilik sohasidagi Davlat mukofotlari / Ўзбекистон Республикасининг фан ва техника, адабиёт, санъат ва меъморчилик соҳасидаги Давлат мукофотлари), established in 2006, corresponds to the State Hamza Prize.

== Recipients ==
From its inception in 1964 until 1989, a total of 277 individuals received the State Hamza Prize. The award was presented every one to three years during this period. Prominent recipients of the award include Abdulla Oripov, Ali Hamroyev, Chingiz Akhmarov, Erkin Vohidov, Halima Nosirova, Komil Yormatov, Malik Qayumov, Oybek, Mirtemir, Sobir Abdulla, Sora Eshontoʻrayeva, and Yoʻldosh Aʼzamov.

== See also ==
- Alisher Navoiy State Prize
- Shota Rustaveli Prize
