= Islam in Uzbekistan =

Islam is the dominant religion in Uzbekistan. Islamic customs were broadly adopted by the ruling elite, and they began patronage of scholars and conquerors such as Muhammad al-Bukhari, Al-Tirmidhi, Ismail Samani, al-Biruni, Avicenna, Tamerlane, Ulugh Begh, and Babur. Despite its predominance and history, the practice of Islam has been far from monolithic since the establishment of the Uzbek Soviet Socialist Republic.

The Muslim Board of Uzbekistan holds the Mushaf Othmani, the earliest existing copy of the Quran.

== Demographics ==
Almost 90% of the population is Muslim. The CIA Factbook estimates 88%, mostly Sunni. The country is regarded a cultural and religious hub in the Central Asian region.

Another estimate states that Muslims constitute 87% of the population while 9% of the population follow Russian Orthodox Christianity, 4% other religious and non-religious. An estimated 93,000 Jews were once present.

According to a 2009 Pew Research Center report, Uzbekistan's population is 96.3% Muslim, around 54% identifies as non-denominational Muslim, 18% as Sunni and 1% as Shia. Around 11% say they belong to a Sufi order.

== History ==
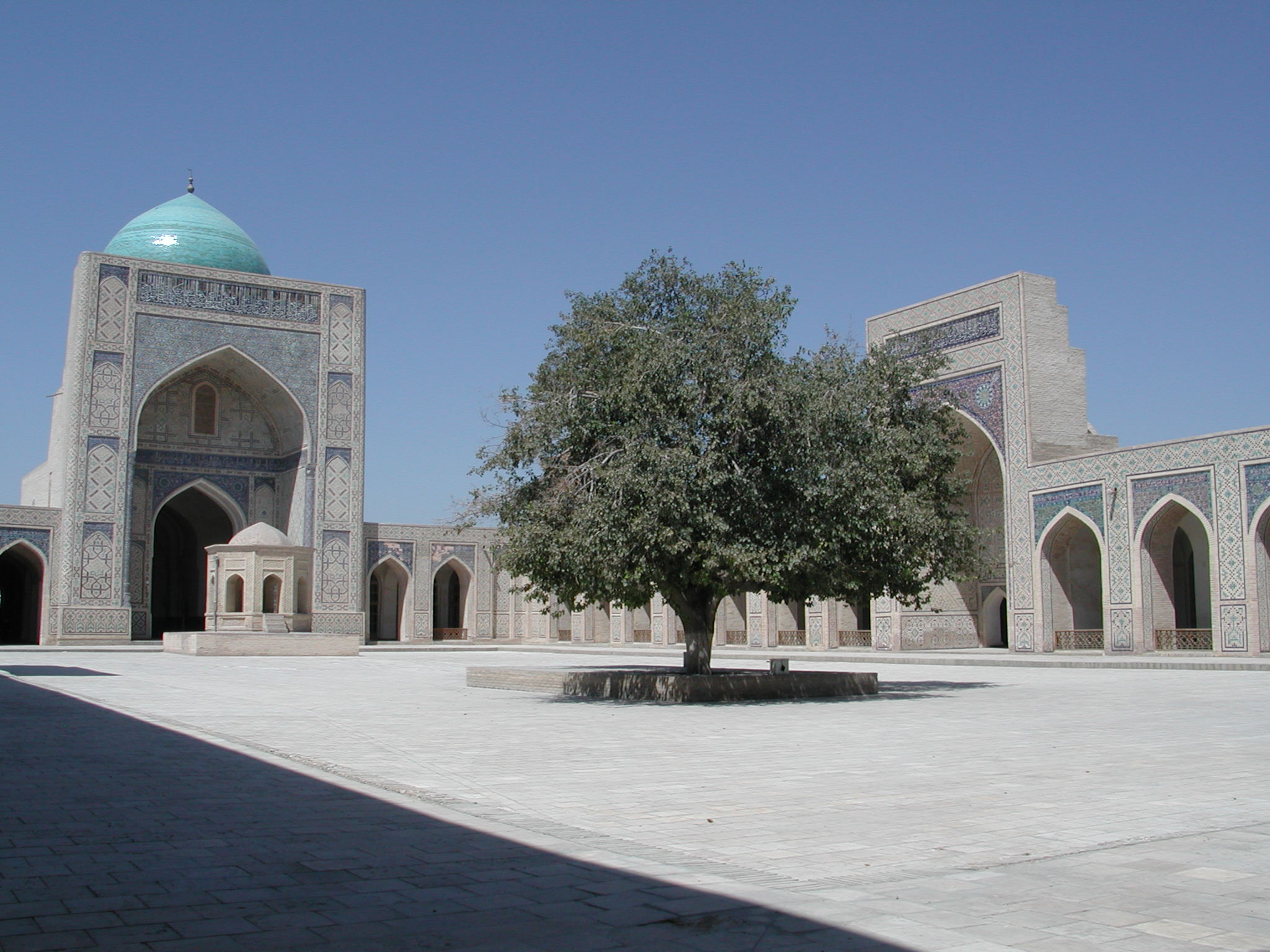
The Po-i-Kalyan Mosque in Bukhara.

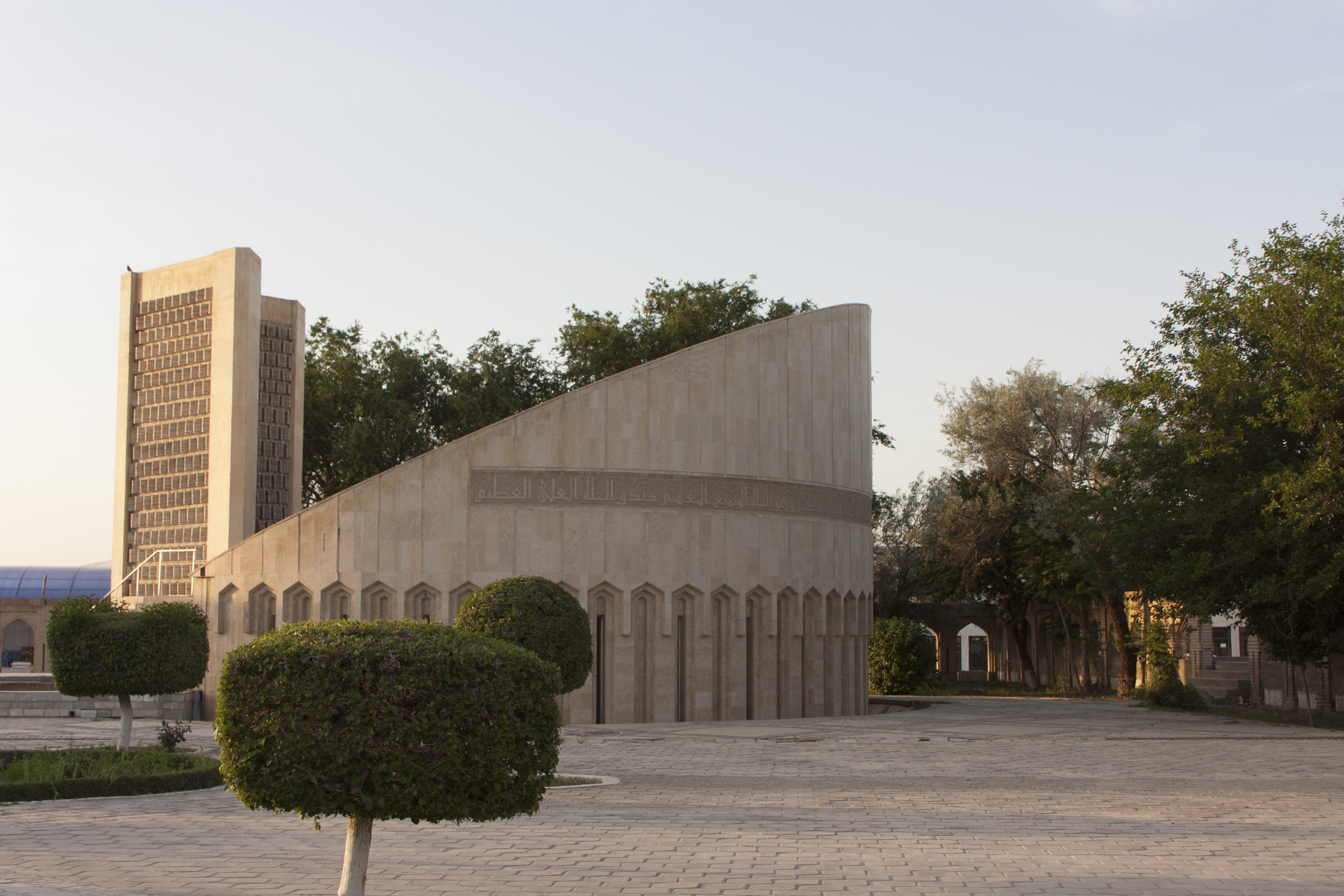
Imam Al Bukhari Memorial.

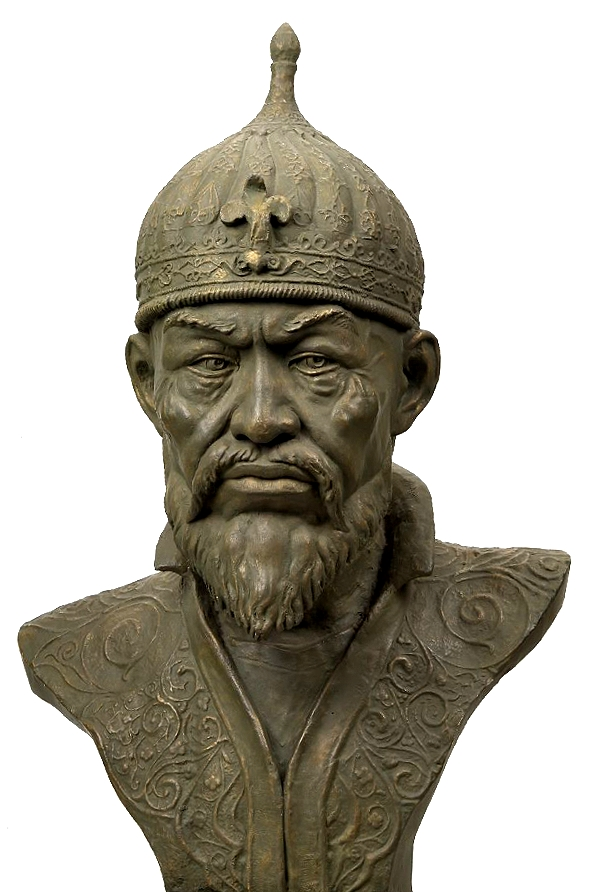
Amir Tamerlane converted nearly all the Borjigin leaders to Islam.

=== Medieval Islam ===
Islam was brought to ancestors of modern Uzbeks during the 8th century when the Arabs entered Central Asia. Islam initially took hold in the southern portions of Turkestan and thereafter gradually spread northward. Islam also took root due to the zealous missionary work of the Iranian Samanid rulers as a significant number of Turkic peoples accepted Islam. The territory became a world leading center of science, medicine, philosophy and invention, ushering in the period of the Golden Age of Islam. In the 14th-century, Tamerlane constructed many religious structures, including the Bibi-Khanym Mosque. He also constructed one of his finest buildings at the tomb of Ahmed Yesevi, an influential Turkic Sufi saint who spread Sufism among the nomads. Omar Aqta, Timur's court calligrapher, is said to have transcribed the Qur'an using letters so small that the entire text of the book fit on a signet ring. Omar also is said to have created a Qur'an so large that a wheelbarrow was required to transport it. Folios of what is probably this larger Qur'an have been found, written in gold lettering on huge pages. Islam also spread amongst the Uzbeks with the conversion of Uzbeg Khan. Converted to Islam by Ibn Abdul Hamid, a Bukharan sayyid and sheikh of the Yasavi order, Uzbeg Khan promoted Islam amongst the Golden Horde and fostered Muslim missionary work to expand across Central Asia. In the long run, Islam enabled the khan to eliminate interfactional struggles in the Horde and to stabilize state institutions.

Notable scholars from the area today known as Uzbekistan include Imam Bukhari whose book, Sahih Bukhari is regarded by Sunni Muslims as the most authentic of all hadith compilations and the most authoritative book after the Qur'an. Other Muslim scholars from the region include Imam Tirmidhi and Abu Mansur Maturidi who was one of the pioneers of Islamic Jurisprudence scholars and his two works are considered to be authoritative on the subject. In Samarqand, the development of sciences in the Muslim world greatly prospered, waving the Timurid Renaissance. The work of Ali Qushji (d. 1474), who worked at Samarqand and then Istanbul, is seen as a late example of innovation in Islamic theoretical astronomy and it is believed he may have possibly had some influence on Nicolaus Copernicus due to similar arguments concerning the Earth's rotation. The astronomical tradition established by the Maragha school continued at the Ulugh Beg Observatory at Samarqand. Founded by Ulugh Beg in the early 15th century, the observatory made considerable progress in observational astronomy.

=== Under the Russian Empire ===
The immediate founder of Jadidism was Crimean Tatar educator and politician Ismail Gasprinsky, which in 1883 began to publish the newspaper "Translator - Terjiman" in the Crimean Tatar and Russian languages. In the same year he opened the first Jadid school in Bakhchysarai. Gasprinsky paid great attention to the education of women.

On August 15, 1905, the Jadidists of Gasprinsky managed to create Ittifaq al-Muslimin (اتفاق المسلمين: "Union of Muslims"), whose first congress was held in Nizhny Novgorod on the steamer "Gustav Struve" and included 150 delegates from Crimea, Transcaucasia, Urals, Turkestan and Siberia. This party was presented in the Russian State Duma. The Samarkand mufti Mahmudhoja Behbudi took an active part in the work of the party. an example of an enlightened ruler was Tamerlane. Another representative of the Ittifak party Musa Bigeyev translated the Koran into Tatar in 1912 for which he received the nickname “Muslim Luther”. Another party representative Abdurashid Ibragimov suggested overcoming the strife between Shiites and Sunnis and suggested focusing on the Japanese Empire. In 1905, an associate of Gasprinsky Nasib-bek Usubbekov created an underground organization Difai in Elizavetpole.

The Young Turk Revolution of 1908 gave a certain impetus to the development of Jadidism and contributed to their final politicization. In 1908, the Jadids began in Orenburg to publish the magazine Shuro (شورا, "Council"), where Rizaitdin Fakhretdinov pursued the idea of succession Volga Bulgaria, Golden Horde and Kazan Khanate. In 1917, on the wave of disintegration of the Russian Empire, Shura-i-Islam ("Council of Islam") was formed in Tashkent, and in Kokand was proclaimed the Turkestan Autonomy, a secular Republic. The local version of the Jadidists were the Young Bukharians, who professed similar ideas on the territory of Bukhara Emirate, as well as the Young Khivans in the Khivan Khanate.

In relation to the Soviet regime, the Jadids took a contradictory position. Some entered into an alliance with the Bolsheviks took part in the formation of Central Asian socialist nations (Fayzulla Khodjaev. Abdurauf Fitrat, Sadriddin Aini, Mirzo Mukhiddin Mansurov, Majid Qadiri), and others joined the anti-Soviet Basmachi movement (Usman Khoja).

=== Soviet Era ===
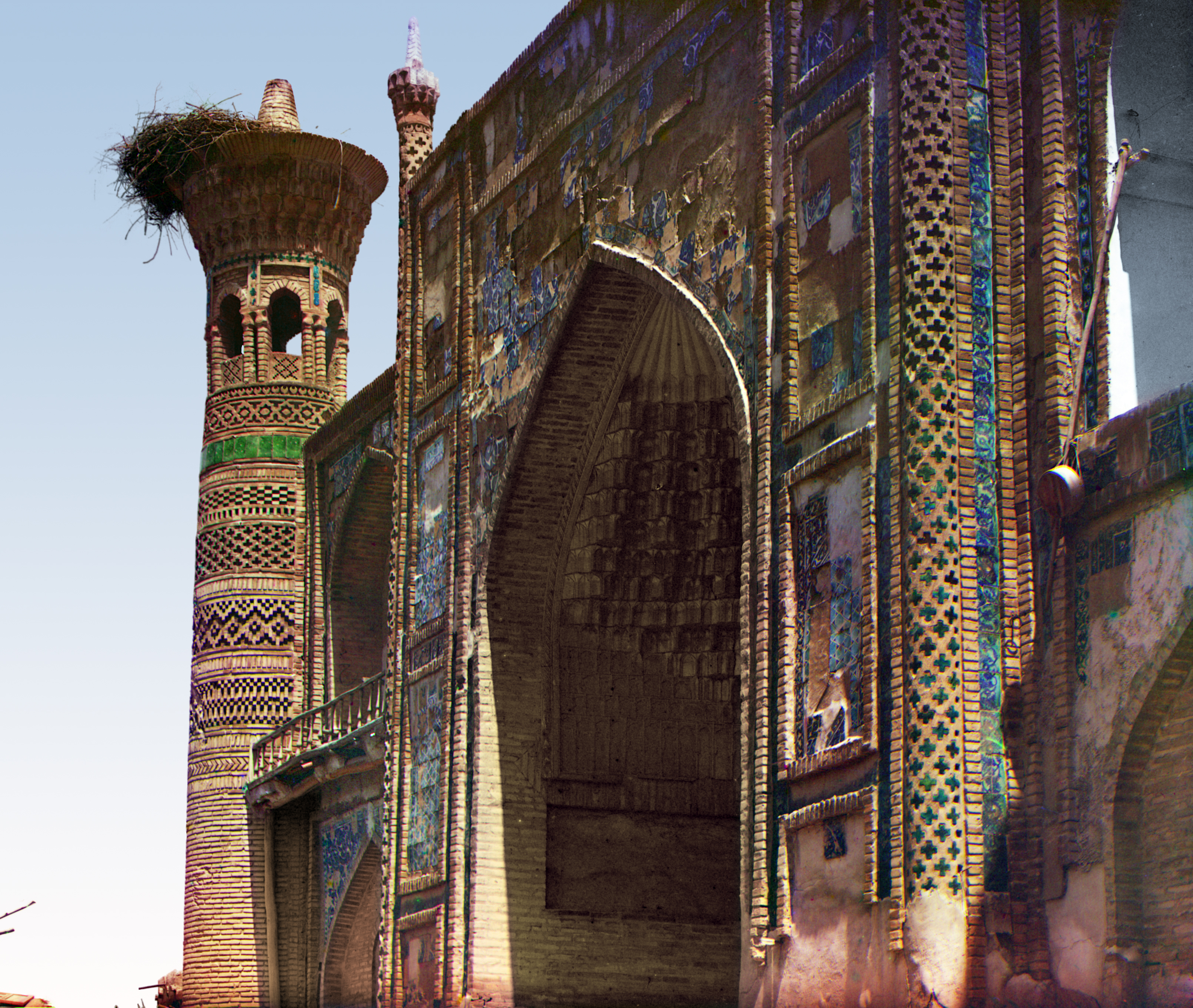
Madrassa in Bukhara (photo taken in 1911)

The grand mufti who headed the board met with hundreds of foreign delegations each year in his official capacity, and the board published a journal on Islamic issues, Muslims of the Soviet East. However, the Muslims working or participating in any of these organizations were carefully screened for political reliability. Furthermore, as the government ostensibly was promoting Islam with the one hand, it was working hard to eradicate it with the other. The government sponsored official anti-religious campaigns and severe crackdowns on any hint of an Islamic movement or network outside of the control of the state. Many mosques were closed.

=== Post-independence ===
==== 1990s ====
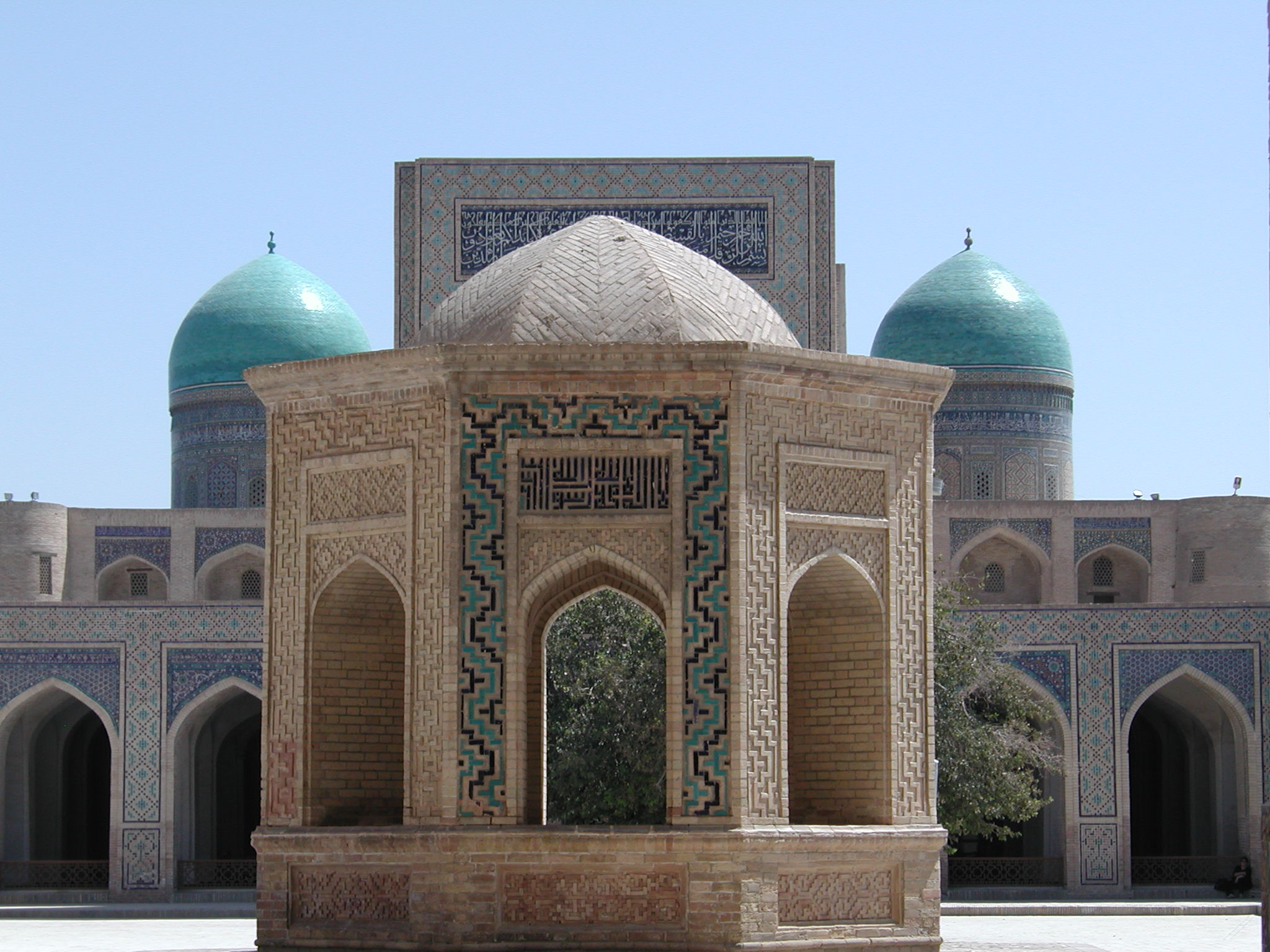
Mosque in Bukhara

In the early 1990s with the end of Soviet power large groups of Islamic missionaries, mostly from Saudi Arabia and Turkey, came to Uzbekistan to propagate Sufi and Wahhabi interpretations of Islam. In 1992, in the town of Namangan, a group of radical Islamists educated at Islamic universities in Saudi Arabia took control of a government building and demanded that president Karimov declare an Islamic state in Uzbekistan and introduce shari‛a as the only legal system. The regime, however, prevailed, and eventually struck down hard on the Islamic militant groups, leaders of which later fled to Afghanistan and Pakistan and were later killed in fights against coalition forces. In 1992 and 1993 around 50 missionaries from Saudi Arabia were expelled from the country. The Sufi missionaries too were forced to end their activities in the country. For the most part, however, in the years after the independence Uzbekistan saw a resurgence of a traditional form of Islam. According to a public opinion survey conducted in 1994, interest in Islam is growing very rapidly. Very few people in Uzbekistan were interested in a form of Islam that would participate actively in political issues. Thus, the first years of post-Soviet religious freedom seem to have fostered a form of Islam related to the Uzbek population more in traditional and cultural terms than in political ones.

==== 2000s ====
The government is against the Hizb ut-Tahrir and the followers of Said Nursî of Turkey.

The government blames the May 2005 unrest in Uzbekistan on an aim to overthrow the government of Uzbekistan in order to make it a Central Asian theocratic republic. Uzbek President Islam Karimov "placed blame for the unrest on Islamic extremist groups, a label that he has used to describe political opponents in recent years and that his critics say is used as a pretext for maintaining a repressive state." Hizb ut-Tahrir have denied involvement in the unrest, but expressed sympathy and solidarity with the victims of the unrest, firmly laying blame on the repressive practices and corruption of the government.

==== 2010s ====
After the death of president Karimov there was a significant rise of the Islamic piety among the population in Uzbekistan.

== See also ==
- Religion in Uzbekistan
- Islam by country
- Jadidism

== Sources ==
- Johan Rasanayagam (8 November 2010). Islam in Post-Soviet Uzbekistan: The Morality of Experience. Cambridge University Press. ISBN 978-1-139-49526-4.
- Vitaliĭ Vi͡acheslavovich Naumkin (2005). Radical Islam in Central Asia: Between Pen and Rifle. Rowman & Littlefield. pp. 37–. ISBN 978-0-7425-2930-4.
- Rob Johnson (15 October 2007). Oil, Islam, and Conflict: Central Asia Since 1945. Reaktion Books. pp. 114–. ISBN 978-1-86189-339-0.
- Shahram Akbarzadeh (4 July 2013). Uzbekistan and the United States: Authoritarianism, Islamism and Washington's Security Agenda. Zed Books Ltd. ISBN 978-1-84813-799-8.
- Rohan, Gunaratna; Yee, Kam Stefanie Li (22 June 2016). Handbook Of Terrorism In The Asia-pacific. World Scientific. pp. 404–. ISBN 978-1-78326-997-6.
