= Lazgi =

Khwarazm traditional dance and song

- Etymology: From a word meaning ‘tremble’
- Genre: Folk dance
- Time signature: Energetic movements of the body, wrists, fingers, neck and shoulders
- Instrument(s): Dutar, surnay, doira, chang, garmon
- Origin: Khorezm region of Uzbekistan

Khorazm dance, Lazgi
- UNESCO Intangible Cultural Heritage
- Country: Uzbekistan
- Reference: 01364
- Region: Asia and the Pacific

Inscription history
- Inscription: 2019 (14th session)
- List: Representative

Lazgi is a folk music and dance of Khorezm. It has different styles for men (heroic and courageous) and women (lyrical and humorous).

== International recognition ==
Lazgi was inscribed on the UNESCO Representative List of the Intangible Cultural Heritage of Humanity under the name “Khorezm dance – Lazgi” on December 13, 2019.

The President of the Republic of Uzbekistan Shavkat Mirziyoyev decreed on September 28, 2020, that a “Lazgi” International Dance Festival will be held every two years from 2022 in Khiva city.

The documentary film “Lazgi” by Ixtiyor Baxtiyorov depicts the history and skill of the dance form, and was awarded the “Best Documentary Film on Dance” at international festivals such as “Art Stream”, “Fifflondon”, “Blackboards”, “Lift-Off Season Awards”, and “IFFT”.

The international premiere of the ballet production “Lazgi – The dance of heart and love” was held at the Dubai Opera.

Uzbek dancers Tamara Khanum, Mukarrama Turgunbayeva and Gavhar Matyakubova have performed Khorezm folk dances to global world stage.

== Performance style ==
The music consists of a small introduction and 3 parts. It is performed in a 6/8 meter with a lively rhythm. The dance starts with slow and simple movements; first the fingers, wrists, elbows and then the whole body comes to life. This is followed by complex movements of the hands, feet and body. The dance movements alternate with the repetition of one part of the music. The character of the music changes and the speed increases, and the dance becomes more intense and ends abruptly.

== Origin ==
There are various legends and stories in the oral tradition of Khorezm about the origin of Lazgi. For example, it is said that it expresses the process of the soul entering the body, or that it was created to help stay warm in the cold climate. There is a legend about the ancient Lazgi. The human body was made of separate parts of clay. They were ordered to “enter the body” and the soul entered and then came out scared. They ordered again, “enter the body”. It said “I’m afraid”. Then a music came from the divine. The soul was enchanted by this music and entered the body without knowing how. First the fingers, toes, wrists, elbows came to life, and the human was formed. This music from the divine was “Lazgi”.

== Types ==
There are 8 types of Lazgi dance in Khorezm:

- “Qayroq lazgi”
- “Dutor lazgi”
- “Surnay lazgi”
- “Masxaraboz lazgi”
- “Saroy lazgi”
- “Changak lazgi”
- “Khiva lazgi”
- “Garmon lazgi”

In addition, since the mid-20th century, various performers have created yalla lazgis with lyrics, such as “Kimni sevar yorisan” (K. Otaniyozov), “Loyiq” (A. Otajonov and M. Rahimov), “Sani oʻzing bir yona” (O. Hayitova, B. Jumaniyozov), “Gal-gal” (B. Hamdamov), “Parang roʻmol” (O. Khudoyshukurov), “Xorazmning lazgisi” (O. Otajonov), “Oʻyna-oʻyna” (K. Rahmonov), “Ajoyib” (T. Shomurodov) and others. The music and rhythm of Lazgi have been used effectively in Sh. Ramazonov's “Khorezm Suite”, M. Yusupov's “Khorezm Song” opera and “Gulsanam” ballet, B. Giyenko's “Suite on Khorezm Themes”, S. Yudakov's “Khorezm Festival March”, M. Bafoyev's “Khorezm Capriccio”.

== Contribution of Komiljon Otaniyozov ==
The musician Komiljon Otaniyozov, with Abdusharif Otajonov and Matniyoz Yusupov, have worked to spread and modernise Lazgi.

In 1958, based on the Khorezm Surnay lazgi, the composer Otajanov added his own style and variations and created an ashula version with the ghazal “Loyiq” by the poet Khushnud Abdulla. Inspired by this, Otaniyozov reworked the instrumental part of Lazgi and created his own unique style that was different from the previous version. He added an introduction to the song in the style of chorlov, with the words “Omon-ey, omon!”, and used the words of Komil Khorezmi for the lyrics, creating a non-repetitive yalla version.

At the initiative of Otaniyozov, the notes of Lazgi and Surnay Lazgi were included in the seventh volume of “Uzbek Folk Music” published in 1960 by his colleague and friend Matniyoz Yusupov (in collaboration with I. Akbarov).

To promote Lazgi, Otaniyozov suggested the inclusion of the “Lazgi” dance in the 1958 film Maftuningman.
