= Order of Outstanding Merit =

- Type: Honorary Award
- Awarded for: Awarded to citizens of the Republic of Uzbekistan and citizens of foreign countries for their great achievements in the development of science and technology, economics and culture, a significant contribution to the development of interstate cooperation and the implementation of domestic and foreign policies aimed at enhancing the international prestige of Uzbekistan
- Presented by: Uzbekistan
- Eligibility: Citizens of Uzbekistan and Non-citizens
- Status: Active
- Established: 29 August 1996
- First award: 29 August 1996
- Final award: 30 September 2020

Highlights
- Total: 120
- Ribbon

Precedence
- Next (higher): Order of Jaloliddin Manguberdi
- Next (lower): Order of El-Yurt Khurmati

The Order of Outstanding Merit (Uzbek: Buyuk xizmatlari uchun) is an order that is currently awarded by the Republic of Uzbekistan.

== Design ==
The Order of Outstanding Merit is made from a 925‑grade silver alloy plated with 0.25‑micron‑thick gold.

The order itself is a ruby‑coloured eight‑pointed star, with scattered green‑coloured triangles between the points of the star. In the centre is a blue‑coloured globe bearing the outline of Uzbekistan. The globe is surrounded by a white‑coloured circle inscribed with the words "for great services" at the top and a laurel wreath at the bottom.

The gilded intermediate block depicts Uzbekistan's national symbol: a Huma bird spreading its wings against the background of a rising sun.

The order weighs 65 grams and has a height of 7 millimetres.

== Recipients by year ==
=== 1996 ===
- (Spain) Juan Antonio Samaranch – President of the IOC (awarded on August 29, 1996)
- Erkin Vohidov – National Poet of Uzbekistan (awarded on November 30, 1996)

=== 1997 ===
- (Uzbekistan) Turgun Alimatov – Uzbek folk music player (awarded on August 26, 1997)
- (Uzbekistan) Said Ahmad - Playwright and writer (awarded on August 26, 1997)

=== 1998 ===
- Leonid Kuchma – President of Ukraine (awarded on February 16, 1998)
- Ismail Dzhurabekov - First Deputy Prime Minister of Uzbekistan (awarded on August 27, 1998)
- (Uzbekistan) Kozim Tulyaganov – mayor (Hokim) of Tashkent (awarded on August 27, 1998)
- Rakhim Akhmedov – People's Artist of Uzbekistan (awarded on August 27, 1998)
- (Uzbekistan) Mutal Burhonov – musical composer (awarded on August 27, 1998)
- (Uzbekistan) Zikir Muhammadjonov – actor (awarded on August 27, 1998)
- Nursultan Nazarbayev – President of Kazakhstan (awarded on October 31, 1998)
- (Kyrgyzstan) Chinghiz Aitmatov – Kyrgyz writer (awarded on December 11, 1998)

=== 1999 ===
- (Uzbekistan) Ozod Sharafiddinov – editor-in-chief of the magazine Jahon adabiyeti (awarded on March 22, 1999)
- (Russia) Salizhan Sharipov – Russian cosmonaut of Kyrgyz descent (awarded on July 29, 1999)
- (Uzbekistan) Buribay Akhmedov – Uzbek scientist (awarded on August 25, 1999)
- (Uzbekistan) Fazila Sulaimonova – leading researcher at the Academy of Sciences (awarded on August 25, 1999)

=== 2000 ===
- (Soviet Union) Gʻafur Gʻulom – Soviet Uzbek academician (awarded posthumously on August 25, 2000)
- (Soviet Union) Musa Tashmukhamedov – Soviet Uzbek poet and writer (awarded posthumously on August 25, 2000)
- (Soviet Union) Abdulla Qahhor – Soviet Uzbek playwright (awarded posthumously on August 25, 2000)
- (Soviet Union) Tuychi Tashmukhamedov – Soviet Uzbek folk musician (awarded posthumously on August 25, 2000)
- (Soviet Union) Mukhitdin Kari-Yakubov – Soviet Uzbek actor and singer (awarded posthumously on August 25, 2000)
- (Soviet Union) Yunus Rajabiy – Soviet Uzbek composer and academician (awarded posthumously on August 25, 2000)
- (Soviet Union) Abror Hidoyatov – Soviet Uzbek theater actor (awarded posthumously on August 25, 2000)
- (Soviet Union) Jurahan Sultanov – Soviet Uzbek actor, singer, and composer (awarded posthumously on August 25, 2000)
- (Soviet Union) Mamurjon Uzakov – Soviet Uzbek singer (awarded posthumously on August 25, 2000)
- (Soviet Union) Komiljon Otaniyozov – Soviet Uzbek singer and musician (awarded posthumously on August 25, 2000)
- (Soviet Union) Botir Zokirov – Soviet Uzbek singer, writer, and actor (awarded posthumously on August 25, 2000)
- (Soviet Union) (Uzbekistan) Malik Nabiev – Soviet Uzbek artist (awarded on August 25, 2000)
- (Soviet Union) (Uzbekistan) Halima Nosirova – Soviet Uzbek opera singer (awarded on August 28, 2000)

=== 2001 ===
- (Soviet Union) Lutfi Sarimsoqova – Soviet Uzbek actress (awarded posthumously on August 22, 2001)
- (Soviet Union) Mukarram Turgunbaeva – Soviet Uzbek ballet dancer (awarded posthumously on August 22, 2001)
- (Soviet Union) Shukur Burkhanov – Soviet Uzbek actor (awarded posthumously on August 22, 2001)
- (Soviet Union) Tamara Khanum – Soviet Uzbek actress of Armenian descent (awarded posthumously on August 22, 2001)
- (Soviet Union) Sadriddin Ayni – Soviet Tajik writer and scholar (awarded posthumously on August 22, 2001)
- (Soviet Union) Maqsud Shayxzoda – Soviet Uzbek poet and playwright (awarded posthumously on August 22, 2001)
- (Soviet Union) Mirtemir Tursunov – Soviet Uzbek poet (awarded posthumously on August 22, 2001)
- (Soviet Union) Mirkarim Osimov – Soviet Uzbek writer (awarded posthumously on August 22, 2001)
- (Soviet Union) Ural Tansykbayev – Soviet Uzbek painter of Kazakh descent (awarded posthumously on August 22, 2001)
- (Soviet Union) (Uzbekistan) Chingiz Akhmarov – Soviet Uzbek artist of Tatar descent (awarded posthumously on August 22, 2001)
- (Soviet Union) Khoji Abdurasulov – Soviet Uzbek artist (awarded posthumously on August 22, 2001)
- (Soviet Union) Mannon Uyghur – Soviet Uzbek actor and playwright (awarded posthumously on August 22, 2001)
- (Soviet Union) Maria Kuznetsova – Soviet Uzbek artist (awarded posthumously on August 22, 2001)
- (Soviet Union) Abbas Bakirov – Soviet Uzbek actor and theater director (awarded posthumously on August 22, 2001)
- (Soviet Union) Usta Shirin Murodov – Soviet Uzbek artist (awarded posthumously on August 22, 2001)
- (Soviet Union) Nabi Ganiev – Soviet Uzbek actor, film director, and screenwriter (awarded posthumously on August 22, 2001)
- (Soviet Union) Murojon Akhmedov – Soviet Uzbek artist (awarded posthumously on August 22, 2001)
- (Soviet Union) (Uzbekistan) Edvard Rtveladze – Soviet Uzbek academician of Georgian descent (awarded on August 22, 2001)
- (Soviet Union) (Uzbekistan) Saodat Kabulova – Soviet Uzbek opera singer and actress (awarded on August 24, 2001)
- (Soviet Union) (Uzbekistan) Oʻtkir Hoshimov – Soviet Uzbek writer (awarded on August 24, 2001)

=== 2002 ===
- (Soviet Union) Khabib Abdullaev – Soviet Uzbek academician (awarded posthumously on August 23, 2002)
- (Soviet Union) Sodiq Azimov – Soviet Uzbek physicist (awarded posthumously on August 23, 2002)
- (Soviet Union) To‘xtasin Jalilov – Soviet Uzbek composer (awarded posthumously on August 23, 2002)
- (Soviet Union) Ubay Oripov – Soviet Uzbek academician (awarded posthumously on August 23, 2002)
- (Soviet Union) Igor Savitsky – Soviet Russian painter and archaeologist (awarded posthumously on August 23, 2002)
- (Soviet Union) (Uzbekistan) Tashmukhamed Sarymsakov – Soviet Uzbek mathematician (awarded posthumously on August 23, 2002)
- (Soviet Union) Sagdy Sirazhdinov – Soviet Uzbek politician and academician (awarded posthumously on August 23, 2002)
- (Soviet Union) Abid Sadykov – Soviet Uzbek chemist and politician (awarded posthumously on August 23, 2002)
- (Soviet Union) Hamid Sulaimonov – Soviet Uzbek scientist (awarded posthumously on August 23, 2002)
- (Soviet Union) Olim Xoʻjayev – Soviet Uzbek actor and theater director (awarded posthumously on August 23, 2002)
- (Soviet Union) Sabir Yunusov – Soviet Uzbek chemist (awarded posthumously on August 23, 2002)
- (Soviet Union) Tashmuhamed Kara-Niyazov – Soviet Uzbek mathematician (awarded posthumously on August 23, 2002)
- (Soviet Union) Yahya Gulyamov – Soviet Uzbek archaeologist (awarded posthumously on August 23, 2002)
- (Soviet Union) Galina Pugachenkova – Soviet archaeologist and art historian (awarded on August 26, 2002)
- (Soviet Union) (Uzbekistan) Abdukodir Khayitmetov – Soviet Uzbek scientist (awarded on August 26, 2002)
- Valdas Adamkus – President of Lithuania (awarded on September 27, 2002)

=== 2003 ===
- Juan Carlos I of Spain – King of Spain (awarded on January 24, 2003)
- Queen Sofía of Spain – Queen of Spain (awarded on January 24, 2003)
- Aleksander Kwaśniewski – President of Poland (awarded on June 30, 2003)
- (Soviet Union) Vasit Vakhidov – Soviet Uzbek surgeon and scientist (awarded posthumously on August 25, 2003)
- (Soviet Union) (Uzbekistan) Makhmud Mirzaev – Soviet Uzbek scientist (awarded posthumously on August 25, 2003)
- (Soviet Union) (Uzbekistan) Askad Mukhtar – Soviet Uzbek writer and poet (awarded posthumously on August 25, 2003)
- (Soviet Union) Ibrohim Moʻminov – Soviet Uzbek scientist (awarded posthumously on August 25, 2003)
- (Soviet Union) Rahim Pirmuhamedov – Soviet Uzbek actor (awarded posthumously on August 25, 2003)
- (Soviet Union) Tolib Sodiqov – Soviet Uzbek composer and conductor (awarded posthumously on August 25, 2003)
- (Soviet Union) Saib Khojaev – Soviet Uzbek actor (awarded posthumously on August 25, 2003)
- (Russian Empire) (Soviet Union) Richard Schroeder – Russian and Soviet scientist (awarded posthumously on August 25, 2003)
- (Soviet Union) Shuhrat – Soviet Uzbek poet and playwright (awarded posthumously on August 25, 2003)
- (Soviet Union) Razzoq Hamroyev – Soviet Uzbek actor (awarded posthumously on August 25, 2003)
- (Georgia (country)) Eduard Shevardnadze – President of Georgia (awarded on October 9, 2003)
- Georgi Parvanov – President of Bulgaria (awarded on November 18, 2003)
- (Uzbekistan) Matyakub Koshchanov – Uzbek academician (awarded on December 18, 2003)
- (Uzbekistan) Zhura Musaev – Uzbek academician (awarded on December 18, 2003)
- (Soviet Union) (Uzbekistan) Yalkin Turakulov – Uzbek scientist (awarded on December 18, 2003)

=== 2004 ===
- (Soviet Union) Khozhikhon Boltaev – Soviet Uzbek artist (awarded posthumously on August 23, 2004)
- (Soviet Union) Muhammadzhon Mirzaev – Soviet Uzbek composer (awarded posthumously on August 23, 2004)
- (Soviet Union) Hamid Olimjon – Soviet Uzbek writer and poet (awarded posthumously on August 23, 2004)
- (Soviet Union) Nabi Rahimov – Soviet Uzbek actor (awarded posthumously on August 23, 2004)
- (Soviet Union) Vsevolod Romanovsky – Soviet Russian mathematician (awarded posthumously on August 23, 2004)
- (Soviet Union) Ayimkhan Shamuratova – Soviet Uzbek actress of Karakalpak descent (awarded posthumously on August 23, 2004)
- (Soviet Union) (Uzbekistan) Sora Eshontoʻrayeva – Soviet Uzbek actress (awarded posthumously on August 23, 2004)

=== 2005 ===
- (Soviet Union) Batyr Valikhodzhaev – Soviet Uzbek academician (awarded posthumously on August 24, 2005)
- (Uzbekistan) Shavkat Rakhmatullaev – Uzbek academician (awarded on August 24, 2005)
- (Uzbekistan) Mamadzhan Rakhmanov – Uzbek academician (awarded on August 24, 2005)
- (Uzbekistan) Yulduz Usmonova – Uzbek actress and singer (awarded on August 24, 2005)
- (Uzbekistan) Zokir Almatov – Uzbek politician (awarded on August 24, 2005)

=== 2006 ===
- (Uzbekistan) Pirimqul Qodirov – Uzbek writer (awarded on August 25, 2006)
- (Uzbekistan) Rakhima Mavlanova – Uzbek academician (awarded on August 25, 2006)

=== 2007 ===
- (Uzbekistan) Ruslan Chagaev – Uzbek professional boxer (awarded on April 17, 2007)
- (Uzbekistan) Timur Atakuziev – Uzbek scientist (awarded on August 27, 2007)
- (Uzbekistan) Albert Ataliev – Uzbek surgeon (awarded on August 27, 2007)
- (Uzbekistan) Orkhon Makhmudov – Uzbek politician (awarded on August 27, 2007)
- (Uzbekistan) Mahmud Salokhiddinov – Uzbek academician (awarded on August 27, 2007)
- (Uzbekistan) Abdulla Ubaidullaev – Uzbek politician (awarded on August 27, 2007)
- Gurbanguly Berdimuhamedow – President of Turkmenistan (awarded on October 17, 2007)

=== 2008 ===
- Vladimir Putin – President of Russia (awarded on February 20, 2008)
- (Uzbekistan) Suyima Gʻaniyeva – Uzbek scholar (awarded on August 25, 2008)
- (Uzbekistan) Hashimjon Ismailov – Uzbek director (awarded on August 25, 2008)
- (Uzbekistan) Mirzaatham Rakhimov – Uzbek scientist (awarded on August 25, 2008)
- (Russia) (Uzbekistan) Artur Taymazov – Russian and Uzbek wrestler and politician of Ossetian descent (awarded on August 25, 2008)
- Valdis Zatlers – President of Latvia (awarded on October 1, 2008)

=== 2011 ===
- (Uzbekistan) Munojot Yoʻlchiyeva – Uzbek singer (awarded on August 24, 2011)
- (Uzbekistan) Muyassar Razzokova – Uzbek singer (awarded on August 24, 2011)

=== 2012 ===
- (Japan) Haruhiko Kuroda – president of the Asian Development Bank (awarded on February 16, 2012)

=== 2013 ===
- Andris Berzins – President of Latvia (awarded on October 18, 2013)

=== 2014 ===
- (Uzbekistan) Azizxon Qayumov – Uzbek scientist (awarded on August 22, 2014)

=== 2015 ===
- (Uzbekistan) Ravshan Irmatov – Uzbek FIFA referee (awarded on December 31, 2015)

=== 2019 ===
- (Uzbekistan) Bahodir Yoʻldoshev – Uzbek artistic director (awarded on August 28, 2019)

=== 2020 ===
- (Uzbekistan) Abdulla Avloniy – Uzbek Jadid poet, playwright, journalist, and scholar (awarded on September 30, 2020)
- (Uzbekistan) Mahmudkhodja Behbudiy – Uzbek Jadid activist, writer, and journalist (awarded on September 30, 2020)
- (Uzbekistan) Munawwar Qari – Uzbek Jadid author, poet, teacher, and journalist (awarded on September 30, 2020)

== See also ==
- Orders, decorations, and medals of Uzbekistan
