= Abror Hidoyatov =

Uzbek actor (1900–1958)

- Born: August 27 1900 [O.S. August 14] Tashkent, Syr-Darya Oblast, Russian Empire
- Died: 3 October 1958 (aged 58); Tashkent, Uzbek SSR, Soviet Union
- Occupations: Actor; singer
- Spouse: Sora Eshontoʻrayeva
- Children: Goga Hidoyatov; Timur Hidoyatov

Abror Hidoyatov (Note: Uzbek: Abror Hidoyatov; Russian: Абрар (Аброр) Хидоятов, romanized: Abrar (Abror) Khidoyatov) (August 27 1900 [O.S. August 14] – 3 October 1958) was a Soviet, Uzbek actor of theater and cinema and a singer. He was honored with the title of People's Artist of the USSR in 1945.

== Biography ==
Hidoyatov was born on 27 August 1900 (according to other sources, December 31 ) in the Degrez Mahalla in Tashkent. At the age of ten, he learned to play the dutar and soon became a singer. He began his stage career in 1918, working in the theatrical group "Turan," led by Mannon Uygʻur (from 1919, the K. Marx Troupe, and from 1920, the Exemplary Regional Drama Troupe).

In 1927, he graduated from the Uzbek State Drama Studio at the Uzbek House of Enlightenment (later the I. V. Stalin Uzbek Institute of Enlightenment) in Moscow, where he studied under Ruben Simonov, Lev Sverdlin, and Iosif Tolchanov. Graduates of this studio formed the core of the Hamza Uzbek Drama Theater. From 1927 until the end of his life, he was an actor in the Central State Exemplary Uzbek Troupe in Samarkand (from 1929, the Hamza State Uzbek Drama Theater in Tashkent, and from 2001, the Uzbek National Academic Drama Theater). He portrayed over 70 roles. He embodied on stage the finest examples of Russian, European, and Uzbek dramatic art. While being a theater actor, he performed folk songs at concerts and appeared in musical dramas and comedies. In 1936, he wrote a play titled "Avaz". He was a member of the Communist party (Bolsheviks) from 1922. He died from a stroke on 3 October 1958, in Tashkent. He was buried at the Chigatai Memorial Cemetery.

=== Family ===
Hidoyatov was married to Sara Ishanturaeva (1911–1998), a dramatic actress. Like her husband, she became a People's Artist of the USSR (1951). Together, they had two sons: Goga Hidoyatov (1930 – 2015), a historian, professor, doctor of historical sciences, and Honored Scientist of the Republic of Uzbekistan, as well as Timur (1932 – 2024), an architect, professor, and lecturer in various disciplines at the Tashkent Architecture and Civil Engineering Institute.

== Awards ==
- People's Artist of the Uzbek SSR (1937)
- People's Artist of the USSR (24 March 1945)
- Stalin Prize 2nd class (1949) – for his performance in the leading role in the play "Alisher Navoi" by Uygur and Sultanov
- Order of Lenin (24 March 1945)
- Two Order of the Red Banner of Labor (31 May 1937 and 16 January 1950)
- Order of Outstanding Merit (25 August 2000)

== Roles in the theater ==
He performed more than thirty roles in theater throughout his career:

- 1921 – "Intrigue and Love" by Friedrich Schiller – Wurm
- 1926 – "The Government Inspector" by Nikolai Gogol – The Mayor
- 1928 – "Zagmuk" by A. G. Glebov – Zer Sibane
- 1929 – "Dva kommunista" by K. Yashen – Arslan
- 1929 – "Myatej" based on Dmitry Furmanov – Kokumbay
- 1930 – "Chelovek s portfelem" by A. M. Faiko – Granatov
- 1930 – "Vrediteli xlopka" by U. Ismailov – Aman
- 1931 – "Istoriya zagovorila" by J. Said and Nazir Safarov – Aripov
- 1932 – "Sojjem" by K. Yashen – Sarymsak
- 1932 – "Maska sorvana" by Zinnat Fatxullin – Toigbek
- 1934 – "Razgrom" by K. Yashen – Arslan
- 1934 – "Intervention" by L. I. Slavin – Brodsky
- 1934 – "Moy drug" by Nikolai Pogodin – Gai
- 1935 – "Hamlet" by William Shakespeare – Hamlet
- 1937 – "Lyubov Yarovaya" by Konstantin Trenyov – Shvandya
- 1939 – "Bay i batrak" by Hamza Hakimzade Niyazi – Gafur
- 1941 – "Othello" by William Shakespeare – Othello
- 1943 – "Mukanna" by Hamid Olimjon – Mukanna
- 1945 – "Alisher Navoi" by Uygʻun and Izzat Sulton – Alisher Navoi
- "The Miser" by Molière – Harpagon
- "Turandot (Gozzi)" by Carlo Gozzi – Calaf
- "Ovechiy istochnik" by Lope de Vega – Frondoso
- "Xalima" by G. Zafari – Negmat
- "Yarkin-oy" by Chulpan – Ahmad-batyr
- "Arshin Mal Alan" by Uzeyir Hajibeyov – Asker
- "Leyli and Majnun" by Uzeyir Hajibeyov – Majnun
- "Yeshyo raz jenyus" by Chulpan – Nasreddin
- "Exo" by V. N. Bill-Belotserkovsky – Bob
- "Rustam" by U. Ismailov – Rustam
- "Farxad i Shirin" by Khurshid, based on the poem by Ali-Shir Nava'i
- "Djalaleddin" by Maqsud Shayxzoda – Timur-Malik

=== Filmography ===
1945 – "Tohir va Zuhra" – Sardor.

== Memory ==
In 1967, a documentary film dedicated to the life and work of the actor was released (directed by Bobo Xoʻjayev).

In Tashkent, the name of A. Hidoyatov is given to the State Drama Theater (Uzbek State Drama Theater named after Abror Hidoyatov) (1991) and One of the Streets (1986).

== See also ==
Bahodir Yoʻldoshev
