= Ubay Orifov =

- Убай Арифов

President of the Academy of Sciences of the Uzbek SSR
- In office 23 January 1962 – 26 February 1966
- Preceded by: Habib Abdullayev
- Succeeded by: Obid Sodiqov

Personal details
- Born: Ubay Orifovich Orifov; 15 June 1909 Kokand, Ferghana Oblast, Russian Turkestan, Russian Empire
- Died: 24 December 1976 (aged 67) Tashkent, Uzbek SSR, Soviet Union
- Citizenship: Soviet Union
- Education: Uzbek State Pedagogical Academy
- Occupation: Physicist, academician
- Awards: Order of Lenin

Ubay Orifovich Orifov (Russian: Убай Арифович Арифов; 15 June [O.S. 2 June] 1909 – 24 December 1976) was a Soviet Uzbek physicist and academician who served as the President of the Academy of Sciences of the Uzbek SSR from 1962 to 1966. He was also a participant in the Great Patriotic War.

== Early life and education ==
Ubay Orifov was born in the city of Kokand in the Ferghana Oblast of Russian Turkestan. He graduated from the Uzbek State Pedagogical Academy in 1931.

== Career ==
He worked at the Central Asian University as an assistant from 1935 to 1941. He join the Communist Party of the Soviet Union in 1944. From 1945 to 1956, Orifov was the Director of the Physicotechnical Institute of the Academy of Sciences of the Uzbek SSR, a position he would serve in again from 1963 to 1967. He was then the Director of the Institute of Nuclear Sciences of the Uzbek SSR from 1956 to 1962. He assumed the position of President of the Academy of Sciences of the Uzbek SSR on January 23, 1962 and served until February 26, 1966. He was then the Director of the Institute of Electronics of the Academy of Sciences of the Uzbek SSR. He was also the editor-in-chief of the Reports of the Academy of Sciences of the Uzbek SSR (1962-1966) and Heliotekhnika (1965-1976) magazines.

Orifov's scientific works mainly focused on physical electronics, solid-state surface physics, nuclear and radiation physics, mass spectrometry, and solar technology. He explored the non-stationary processes on the surface of metals and developed methods for determining coefficients of ionization surfaces and the heats of adsorption and desorption. He also explored the patterns of electron emission during the bombardment of metal crystals and film systems by atomic particles. In addition, he developed the mechanisms of potential and kinetic electron emission of various classes of the surface of a solid body; established the possibility of a strong increase in the yield of negative ions from the sprayed surface and laid the foundation for the development of spray sources of negative ions; proved the possibility of directional changes in surface properties using beams of charged particles and developed methods of ion nitriding, passivation, ion-beam treatment, etc.; and designed solar furnaces with a diameter of up to 3 meters, solar photo converters, solar concentrators, etc.

== Death ==
Ubay Orifov died at the age of 67 in Tashkent.

== Awards ==
- Order of Lenin
- Order of the Red Banner of Labour (1 March 1965)
- Order of the Red Star
- Two Order of the Badge of Honour (16 January 1950,?)
- Order of Outstanding Merit (23 August 2002)
- State Biruni prize (1968)

== See also ==
- Academy of Sciences of the Uzbek SSR
