= Yunusov =

Yunusov (Russian: Юнусов) is an Azerbaijani and Central Asian masculine surname slavicised from Yunus, its feminine counterpart is Yunusova. It may refer to

- Choʻlpon (Abdulhamid Yunusov, 1893–1938), Uzbek poet, playwright, novelist, and literary translator
- Anvar Yunusov (born 1987), Tajikistan boxer
- Arif Yunusov (born 1955), Azerbaijani author, historian, and human rights activist
- Khalim Yunusov (born 1997), Russian football player
- Sabir Yunusov (1909–1995), Soviet chemist
- Timati (born Timur Yunusov in 1983), Russian artist
