= Mahmud Salohiddinov =

- Born: 23 November 1933; Namangan, Uzbek SSR, USSR
- Died: 27 April 2018 (aged 84); Tashkent, Uzbekistan
- Citizenship: Soviet Union; Uzbekistan
- Education: Central Asia State University
- Awards: Biruni State Prize (1974)

Mahmud Salohiddinovich Salohiddinov (Uzbek Cyrillic: Маҳмуд Салоҳиддинович Салоҳиддинов, Russian: Махмуд Салахитдинович Салахитдинов; 23 November 1933 – 27 April 2018) was a Soviet-Uzbek mathematician, academic, and politician. From 1988 to 1994 he was the head of the Academy of Sciences of Uzbekistan.

== Biography ==
He was born in Namangan on 23 November 1993. His father was the director of a local canning factory, and his mother was a housewife. He had three siblings. In 1958 he graduated from the Mathematics Department of Central Asia State University.

In 1959 he began working at the V.I. Romanovsky Institute of Mathematics as a junior research fellow, and he became the director of it 1967.

He was admitted to the Communist Party in 1962. He became a corresponding member of the Academy of Sciences of the Uzbek SSR in 1968 and a full member in 1974. From 1985 to 1988, he was the minister of higher and secondary specialized education of the Uzbek SSR. In 1988 he became the head of the Academy of Sciences of the Uzbek SSR, and he continued to serve in the position after Uzbekistan gained independence until 1994.

He died on 27 April 2018 at the age of 85.

== Awards ==
- Biruni State Prize (1974)
- Order of the Badge of Honor (1976)
- Order of Outstanding Merit (27 August 2007)
- Order of Labor Glory
- Order "For selfless services"
