= Shuhrat =

Uzbek writer (1918–1993)

- Born: G‘ulom Aminjonovich Alimov; 19 April 1918
- Died: 20 June 1993 (aged 75)
- Citizenship: USSR, Uzbekistan
- Writing career
- Pen name: Shuhrat
- Language: uzbek
- Genres: Prose, poetry, dramaturgy

Shuhrat (given name: Gulom Aminjonovich Alimov; 19 April 1918 – 20 June 1993) was an Uzbek and Soviet writer, poet, playwright, and translator. He has been awarded People's Writer of the Uzbek SSR (1983) and Honored Artist of the Uzbek SSR (1978).

== Biography ==
Shuhrat was born 19 April 1918 in Tashkent. His father was a craftsman. After high school, he studied at a transportat technical school (1932–1933). Then, from 1934 to 1936, he studied at the Central Asian Institute of Transport Engineers (now the Tashkent State Transport University), working as an Assistant Secretary of the Writers' Union of Uzbekistan at the same time. From 1936 to 1940, he attended the Tashkent State Pedagogic University named after Nizami.

Shuhrat served in the military from November 1940 to 15 July 1943, attaining the rank of senior lieutenant. He served in the 164th Brigade of the North Caucasus Front. He was awarded the Order of the Patriotic War, Second Class, in honor of the 40th anniversary of Victory Day.

From 1945 to 1948, he worked for the youth magazine Sharq yulduzi, where he later served as a department head from 1948 to 1950.

In 1951, he was arrested along with Maqsud Shayxzoda, Shukrullo, and Said Ahmad for "nationalist activities" and sentenced to 25 years in prison. He was imprisoned in various camps in Kazakhstan. He was rehabilitated in 1955.

From 1955 to 1958 and from 1960 to 1970, he served as a literary adviser to Uzbek national newspapers and magazines. In 1958, he served as director of the literary fund, and from 1960 to 1970, he was executive secretary of the Writers' Union of Uzbekistan.

Shuhrat died at the age of 76 on 20 June 1993 in Tashkent.

== Literary works ==
Shuhrat made his debut as a poet in 1936 with the collection of poems Mehrol. Several more collections of his poetry were published between 1936 and 1940.

Shuhrat is the author of poetry collections Breath of Life (1949), Ballads (1959), Immortality (1961), Great Love (1966), Lyrics (1973), Poems (1977), and Enamored Heart (1979). He has written the short stories Family (1946), Rustam (1947), Tragedy of One Night (1976), and Man to Man (1980). He also authored the novels Years in Overcaots (1959), Gold Doesn't Rust (1965), and In Search of Paradise (1968). Many of his works have been translated into other languages.

He was engaged in translating works into Uzbek, including those of Heinrich Heine, Alexander Pushkin, Mikhail Lermontov, Adam Mickiewicz, and Taras Shevchenko, as well as poems by Japanese, Vietnamese, and Azerbaijani poets.

== Selected works ==
=== Poetry ===
- "Bizning koʻcha", 1947;
- "Hayot nafasi", 1948;
- "Qardoshlar", 1950;
- "Balladalar", 1958;
- "Mardlik afsonasi" 1959;
- "Guldursin" 1960;
- "Sening sevging", 1961;
- "Soʻlmas chechaklar";
- "Jamila" 1962;
- "Quvgʻindi" 1963;
- "Ishqingda yonib", 1964;
- "Buyuk muhabbat", 1966;
- "Lirika", 1973;
- "Shaydo koʻngil", 1976;
- "Hali tun uzoq", 1984

=== Prose ===
- "Oila", 1946;
- "Rustam", 1947;
- "Balogʻat", 1958;
- "Shinelli yillar" 1958;
- "Bir kecha fojiasi", 1976

== Awards ==
- The Order of the Patriotic War, Second Class
- National writer of Uzbekistan (1983)
- Meritorious Artist of the Uzbek SSR (1978)
- Order of Outstanding Merit (Uzbekistan) (2003, posthumous)
- Order of "El-yurt hurmati"
- Certificate of Honor from the Republic of Uzbekistan (1993)

== Literature ==
- Яковлев Б. В. Шухрат // Краткая литературная энциклопедия / Гл. ред. А. А. Сурков. — М. : Советская энциклопедия, 1975. — Т. 8. Флобер — Яшпал. — С. 814.

== Links ==
- Archived copy from 1 March 2019, on the Wayback Machine.
- Shuhrat
