= Scientific Research Institute of Irrigation and Water Problems =

Research institute in Tashkent, Uzbekistan

- Founder: Vladimir Zhurin
- Established: 1925
- Focus: Water research
- Director: Abduvokhid Urazkeldiev
- Formerly called: Central Asian Experimental Research Institute for Water Management; Central Asian Scientific and Research Institute of Irrigation
- Location: Tashkent, Uzbekistan
- Website: https://ismiti.uz/

The Scientific Research Institute of Irrigation and Water Problems (Uzbek: Irrigatsiya va suv muammolari ilmiy-tadqiqot instituti; Russian: Научно-исследовательский институт ирригации и водных проблем) (SRIIWP), formerly known as the Central Asian Scientific and Research Institute of Irrigation (Russian: Среднеазиатский научно-исследовательский институт ирригации, САНИИРИ), is a research institution based in Tashkent, Uzbekistan, specializing in irrigation, water management, and land reclamation. The institute is commonly referred to by the transliteration of its former Russian acronym, SANIIRI, in English-language sources.

The institute was established in 1925 as an experimental research organization at the initiative of Soviet hydraulic engineer Vladimir Zhurin, who also served as the institute's first director. In 1932, it was officially renamed as the Central Asian Scientific and Research Institute of Irrigation. In 1960, it was merged with the Institute of Water Problems and Hydraulic Engineering of the Academy of Sciences of Uzbekistan. In 1973, Viktor Dukhovny became the head of the SANIIRI. The Scientific Information Center of the Interstate Commission for Water Coordination (SIC ICWC) was first established as part of the SANIIRI, but in 1996 became an independent entity. In 2012, the SANIIRI was merged with the Institute of Water Problems, forming the present-day Scientific Research Institute of Irrigation and Water Problems.

In 2025, a conference was held in Tashkent on the occasion of the 100th anniversary of the institute.
