= Suyima Gʻaniyeva =

Soviet-Uzbek literary scholar (1932–2018)

Suyima Gʻaniyeva (1932-2018) was a Soviet and Uzbek literary scholar, a professor, and a Hero of Uzbekistan (2015).

== Early life and education ==
Suyima Gʻaniyeva was born in Tashkent to a family of workers. She engaged in the study of Uzbek classical literature. Gʻanieva graduated from the Faculty of Oriental Studies of the Central Asian State University (1952) and postgraduate studies at the Leningrad State University (1953-1956). In 1956 Gʻanieva defended her thesis on the work of Alisher Navoi.

== Career ==
In 1956, Gʻaniyeva became a junior researcher at the Institute of Language and Literature of the Academy of Sciences of Uzbekistan. Subsequently, she was a scientific secretary of the Institute of Language and Literature of the Academy of Sciences of Uzbekistan, head chair at the Tashkent State Conservatory, and professor at the Tashkent State Institute of Oriental Studies.

Gʻaniyeva found and published the work of Alisher Navoi Munojot, which remained unknown to science for many years.

Gʻaniyeva is an author of fundamental research on Uzbek classical literature and its role in world culture, and an author of 14 monographs, more than 350 scientific and theoretical articles, and more than 20 teaching manuals.

== Works ==
- "Life and work of Alisher Navoi"
- "The ideas of humanism in the work of Alisher Navoi"
- "Motives of nobility in the gazelles of Navoi"
- "Testament of Navoi"
- "Autograph of Navoi"

== Awards ==
Gʻaniyeva is a laureate of the State Prize of the Republic of Uzbekistan, awarded with the orders El-yurt khurmati (1999) and Order of Outstanding Merit (2008). In 2015 she was awarded the title of Hero of Uzbekistan.

== Commemoration ==
The documentary film "The Way" is dedicated to the scientific work and creative life of Suyima Gʻaniyeva
