= Fundamental Library of Uzbekistan Academy of Sciences =

Coordinates: 41.30673°N 69.286652°E

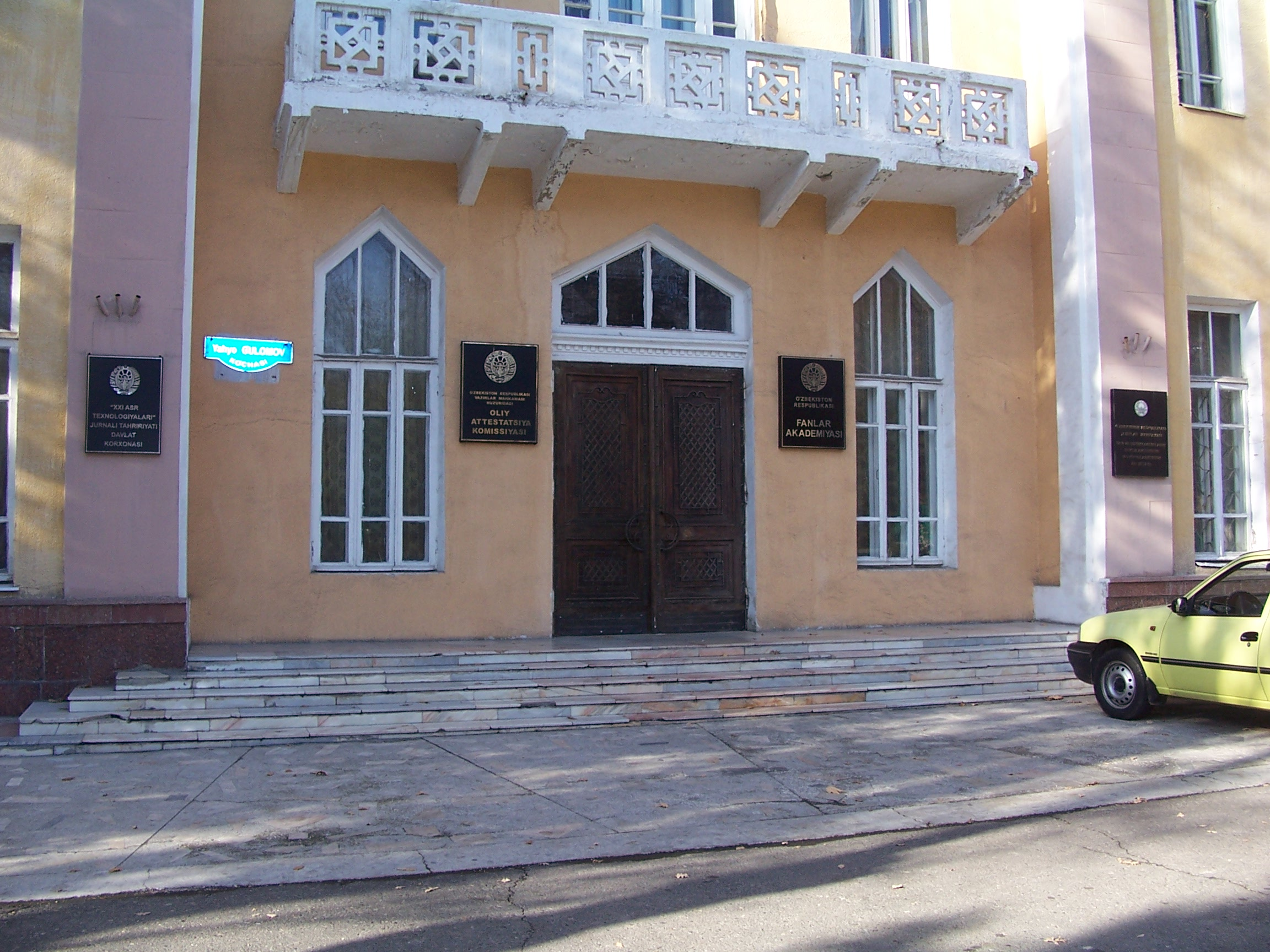
- Location: Tashkent city, Uzbekistan, Uzbekistan
- Established: 1933 Tashkent city

Collection
- Size: 5 million

Other information
- Director: Berdieva Zukhra Shukurovna
- Website: http://www.academy.uz/uz/publications/libraries.php

The Fundamental Library of Uzbekistan Academy of Sciences is one of the key parts of "Academy of Sciences of Uzbekistan" and plays significant role in development of sciences in the Republic of Uzbekistan.

== About ==
Fundamental Library of Uzbekistan Academy of Sciences supports the researches and scientific workers of Academy of Sciences of Uzbekistan with information recourses and is the coordinator of information among the members of Academy of Sciences of Uzbekistan. The "Fundamental Library of Uzbekistan Academy of Sciences" supplies the visitors with the Internet access and it consists of 5 departments, which are given as follows:

- Fund of the library
- Serving department
- Scientific methodic and biographic recourses department
- International department
- Information technologies department

The fund of the “Fundamental Library of Uzbekistan Academy of Sciences” consists of more than 5 million different books, and the library is nowadays used by more than 45 thousand subscribers.

== History of development ==
- 1933 – “Fundamental Library of Uzbekistan Academy of Sciences” was founded
- 1994 – first electron catalog of books was created at the “Fundamental Library of Uzbekistan Academy of Sciences”
- 1998 –technological operations are held at the “Fundamental Library of Uzbekistan Academy of Sciences”
- 2001 – the first innovational project was held at the “Fundamental Library of Uzbekistan Academy of Sciences” among the libraries of Central Asia, about 150 library workers raised their qualifications at the library
- 2002 – new academic project held at the “Fundamental Library of Uzbekistan Academy of Sciences”
- 2007 – information recourse center was established at the “Fundamental Library of Uzbekistan Academy of Sciences”, which gave the opportunity of usage of the software tools like “YEVSSO” and “PMT8”.

== International affairs ==
“Fundamental Library of Uzbekistan Academy of Sciences” currently cooperates with many international and local libraries, as well as many Academy of Sciences of different countries.

== Location ==
“Fundamental Library of Uzbekistan Academy of Sciences” is located in Tashkent city, Uzbekistan, I.Muminova street, house 13.

== Director ==
Currently, the director of the "Fundamental Library of Uzbekistan Academy of Sciences" is Berdieva Zukhra Shukurovna.

== See also ==
- National Library of Uzbekistan
- Academy of Sciences of Uzbekistan
