= Obid Sodiqov =

Soviet chemist and politician

- Абид Садыков (Russian); Obid Sodiqov (Uzbek)

President of the Academy of Sciences of the Uzbek SSR
- In office 1966–1984
- Preceded by: Ubay Orifov
- Succeeded by: Po‘lat Habibullayev

Chairman of the Supreme Soviet of the Uzbek SSR
- In office 1963–1967
- Preceded by: Mirzamahmud Musakhanov
- Succeeded by: Sagdy Sirzahdinov

Personal details
- Born: Obid Sodiqovich Sodiqov; 15 November 1913 Tashkent, Russian Turkestan, Russian Empire
- Died: 21 July 1987 (aged 73) Tashkent, Uzbek SSR, Soviet Union
- Citizenship: Soviet Union
- Party: CPSU
- Education: Central Asian University of Tashkent
- Awards: Hero of Socialist Labour

Obid Sodiqovich Sodiqov (Uzbek: Obid Sodiqovich Sodiqov; Russian: Абид Садыкович Садыков; 15 November 1913 – 21 July 1987) was a Soviet Uzbek organic chemist, academician, and politician.

== Early life and education ==
Obid Sodiqov was born in Tashkent, Russian Turkestan, Russian Empire on November 15, 1913. He graduated from the Central Asian University of Tashkent in 1937 with a Doktor nauk.

== Career ==
After graduating, he taught at the Tashkent Institute of Textile and Light Industry from 1937 to 1939. From 1941, he worked at the Central Asian University of Tashkent and became a Rector at the university in 1958. He simultaneously worked as the Director of the Institute of Chemistry of the Academy of Sciences of the Uzbek SSR. From 1963 to 1967, he served as the Chairman of the Supreme Soviet of the Uzbek SSR. From 1966 to 1984, Sodiqov served as the President of the Academy of Sciences of the Uzbek SSR. He became a full member of the Academy of Sciences of the Soviet Union on November 28, 1972. In 1973, Sodiqov became the Head of the Department of Bio organic Chemistry of the Academy of Sciences of the Uzbek SSR. He was awarded the Hero of Socialist Labour in 1973.

Sodiqov was a member of the 9th Convocation of the Supreme Soviet of the Soviet Union.

== Death ==
Sodiqov died in Tashkent, Uzbek SSR, Soviet Union on 21 July 1987. He was buried at the Chigatai Cemetery.

== Awards ==
- Hero of Socialist Labour (16 November 1973)
- Order of Outstanding Merit (23 August 2002, posthumous)
- Four Order of Lenin (15 September 1961, 1 March 1965, 16 November 1973, 17 September 1975) (Note: His obituary said that he got five Order of Lenin, but warheroes.ru reports he got only four Order of Lenin.)
- Order of the October Revolution (20 July 1971)
- Order of the Red Banner of Labour (16 January 1950)
- Order of Friendship of Peoples (15 November 1983)
- Order of the Badge of Honour (23 January 1946)
- Biruni State Prize

== See also ==
- National University of Uzbekistan
- Hero of Socialist Labour
- Ubaydulla Uvatov
