= Behzod Yoʻldoshev =

Uzbek physicist (1945–2024)

Behzod Yo‘ldoshev
- Беҳзод Йўлдошев
- Born: 9 May 1945; Tashkent, Uzbek SSR, USSR
- Died: 28 August 2024 (aged 79)
- Occupation: Physicist

Behzod Sodiqovich Yo‘ldoshev (Russified form Bekhzod Sodiqovich Yuldoshev; 9 May 1945 – 28 August 2024) was an Uzbek physicist, a science organizer, and a public figure. He served as the president of the Academy of Sciences of the Republic of Uzbekistan from 2000 to 2005 and again from 2017 onwards. He was an academician of the Academy of Sciences of Uzbekistan (2000) and held a Doctor of Physical and Mathematical Sciences degree. He died on 28 August 2024, at the age of 79.

== Early life ==
Born on 9 May 1945 in Tashkent, Yoʻldoshev initially worked as a junior researcher at the Institute of Nuclear Physics of the Academy of Sciences of the Uzbek SSR after he graduated from Tashkent State University in 1968. After defending his thesis in 1971, he went on to work as a senior researcher at the Budker Institute of Nuclear Physics.

== Career ==
Having defended his thesis for his doctorate of physical and mathematical sciences in 1981, he went on to be head of a laboratory Physicotechnical Institute of the Academy of Sciences of Uzbekistan, holding that post from 1984 to 1990. In June that year, he became the director of the Institute of Nuclear Physics, where he remained until 2006. Meanwhile, he became a corresponding member of the Academy of Sciences in 1994, and then a full member in 2000. That year, he was made president of the Academy of Sciences, but he was removed from the post on 21 November 2005. Earlier that year on 24 January, he had been appointed a member of the Oliy Majlis by decree of Karimov. In 2006 he was demoted to laboratory head in the Institute of Nuclear Physics. In the course of his work, he conducted research outside Uzbekistan, becoming a visiting professor at both Stanford University and the University of Washington as well as working on projects with Fermilab and TRIUMF. In addition, he worked as a consultant for the IAEA for four years. Eventually, on 10 January 2017, he was elected to be the president of the Academy of Sciences of Uzbekistan again, and in 2022 he was elected as a member of the Russian Academy of Sciences. As of 2022 he has authored over 400 papers, trained 9 doctoral students, and 30 candidates of sciences.

== Scientific works ==
The author of over 300 scientific works, including 3 monographs and 20 inventions, has supervised the research of 9 doctoral candidates and more than 30 candidates for scientific degrees. He experimentally proved for the first time the existence of a unified mechanism of quark hadronization in interactions between neutrinos (leptons) and high-energy hadrons with nuclei. He was the first to obtain and interpret experimental evidence for the existence of a new type of hadronic matter - narrow dibaryon resonances (dibaryon). He discovered the presence of local properties within nuclear matter.

== Awards and honors ==
- Beruni State Prize (1983)
- Foreign member of the National Academy of Sciences of Kazakhstan
- Member of the American Physical Society, fellow of the State University of Indiana and Cambridge University, and honorary professor at Samarkand State University
- Member of the Islamic World Academy of Sciences in Amman, Jordan
- Honorary Doctorate from the United Institute for Nuclear Research (2005)
- Order of Labor Glory (22 August 2003)
- ESO International Prize (2004)
- Order of Honored People and Homeland (28 August 2011)
- Honoured Scientist of the Republic of Uzbekistan (28 August 2018)
