= Shura-i-Islam =

Political party in Turkestan

Shura-i-Islam شورى الإسلام
- Leader: Munawwar Qari
- Founded: 15 March 1917
- Dissolved: 22 February 1918
- Merged into: Basmachi movement
- Headquarters: Kokand
- Ideology: Jadidism; Islamic modernism; Turkestani autonomism; Anti-communism
- Religion: Sunni Islam

Shura-i-Islam (Arabic: شورى الإسلام, lit. 'Council of Islam, Islamic Council') was a socio-political organization in Turkestan that existed during the Russian Revolution and Russian Civil War. The organization was founded in early March 1917 in Tashkent and was ideologically connected with the national democratic educational movement of Jadidism. The organization was headed by Munawwar Qari. Mustafa Shokay, A.V. Kori, M. Muminbaev, A. Temirbekov, Mirjalilov Saidnasyr, and others played an active role in the organization. By the end of March 1917, branches of Shura-i-Islam appeared in almost all cities of Turkestan Samarkand branch of the Shura-i-Islam" was founded and led by Qazi-Kalyan of the Samarqand RegionIsohon Shirinkhuzhaev.

One of the main political demands of the organization was the creation of a national-religious autonomy for Turkestan within Russia. The organization advocated the preservation of private property, including land.

On April 16–23, 1917, the Shura-i-Islam congress was held, which was attended by delegates from 42 of its branches. The congress made a decision on the cultural and political self-government of Turkestan and expressed confidence in the Provisional Government. The "Regional Council of Turkestan Muslims" was elected at the congress.

Since the inception of the organization, two main wings of the Jadids and Ulemists have emerged. The former advocated the implementation of bourgeois democratic reforms, the latter were supporters of orthodox Islam, demanded observance of Sharia norms, opposed the educational reform in the European manner. In June 1917, the Ulemists withdrew from Shura-i-Islam and formed their own organization, Shura-i-Ulema.

Members of the organization negatively greeted the October Revolution in Russia and the Armed Uprising in Tashkent in October 1917. In response to the proclamation of the Turkestan Soviet Republic in Tashkent, members of the organization took part in the creation of a national government in Kokand (see Turkestan Autonomy). After the defeat of the government in Kokand, members of the organization participated in the Basmachi movement against Soviet power in Turkestan.

== Books ==
- Гражданская война и военная интервенция в СССР. Энциклопедия. М.: Советская энциклопедия, 1983
- Победа Советской власти в Средней Азии и Казахстане. Ташкент: 1967
- Иноятов Х. Ш., Октябрьская революция в Узбекистане. М.: 1958;
- Житов К. Е., Победа Великой Октябрьской социалистической революции в Узбекистане, Ташкент: 1957.
