= Abdulla Avloniy Memorial Museum =

Memorial museum in Tashkent, Uzbekistan

- Abdulla Avloniy yodgorlik muzeyi
- Main exhibition hall (2024)
- Established: 1968
- Location: 6 Ziyo Street, Olmazor District, Tashkent, Uzbekistan
- Coordinates: 41.3545°N 69.2144°E
- Type: Memorial museum
- Collection size: About 400 items on display (2024)
- Owner: National Institute of Pedagogical Excellence named after A. Avloni
- Website: avloniymuseum.uz

The Abdulla Avloniy Memorial Museum (Uzbek: Abdulla Avloniy yodgorlik muzeyi; also rendered Abdulla Avloni Memorial Museum) is a memorial museum in Tashkent, Uzbekistan, dedicated to the life and work of the Jadid educator, writer and public figure Abdulla Avloniy (1878–1934). It is housed in the building of the National Institute of Pedagogical Excellence named after A. Avloni. It is listed in the UMAC Worldwide Database of University Museums and Collections, maintained by a committee of the International Council of Museums (ICOM).

== History ==
The museum was established in 1968 in the house where Avloniy had lived with his family from 1910 to 1934. On the initiative of the Uzbekistan Society of Book Lovers, it was officially opened as the Avloniy House Museum in December 1988, on the 110th anniversary of his birth.

In 1993 the museum was moved to the building of the Abdulla Avloniy Central Institute for the Retraining and Advanced Training of Public Education Staff, the predecessor of the present institute, and was reopened there on 26 December 1993 as the Avloniy Memorial Museum. According to the 2009 encyclopedia Toshkent, the museum then held 682 items and consisted of a memorial section, with Avloniy's household and personal belongings and his books in Uzbek and Russian, and a literary section with photographs, documents, books and journals relating to his educational, journalistic, theatrical, literary and public activities.

After the institute's buildings were renovated and new ones were built, a new exhibition was created in 2024 to mark the 90th anniversary of the institute, which was founded in 1934. On 30 September 2024 the President of Uzbekistan, Shavkat Mirziyoyev, visited the institute and toured the museum and its library.

== Exhibition ==
According to the museum, about 400 items are on display. The exhibition presents the Jadids' attention to education, the education system founded by Avloniy, textbooks and stage works of the period, and the stages in the development of general education; portraits of Jadid enlighteners have been recreated with the help of artificial intelligence.

The museum's holdings include books from Avloniy's personal library; printed and manuscript works of the 18th and 19th centuries, among them works by Alisher Navoi, Bedil and Shams Tabrizi; newspapers and journals published in Turkestan, Turkey and Azerbaijan in the early 20th century; and early textbooks written for the Jadid new-method schools. Among the exhibits is a 1913 edition of Padarkush, a play by Mahmud Khoja Behbudiy.

From the museum's collection

Issue no. 5 of Shuhrat, the newspaper published by Avloniy (8 January 1908)

Poster of the Turon troupe's performances in Khujand (June 1915)

Avloniy's Ikkinchi muallim, second edition (AH 1333)

Avloniy's poetry collection Adabiyot, part 2 (1917)
