= Abdulla Avloniy =

Uzbek poet, playwright, journalist, scholar (1878–1934)

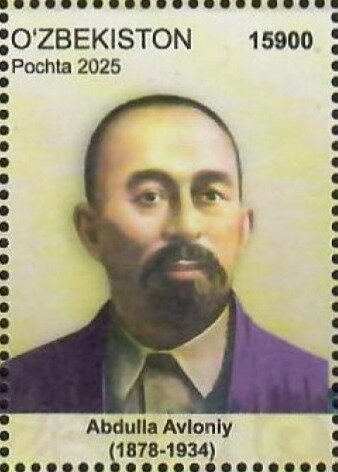
- Avloniy on a 2026 stamp of Uzbekistan
- Born: 12 July 1878; Tashkent, Russian Turkestan (now Uzbekistan)
- Died: 25 August 1934 (aged 56); Tashkent, Uzbek SSR, Soviet Union (now Uzbekistan)
- Spouse: Salomatxon Islomova
- Children: Savriniso Avlonova, Karima Avlonova, Kunduz Avlonova, Hakima Avlonova, Asadilla Avlonov
- Awards: Hero of Socialist Labour; Order of Outstanding Merit
- Scientific career
- Fields: teacher, poet, playwright, journalist

Abdulla Avloniy (12 July 1878 – 25 August 1934) was an Uzbek poet, playwright, journalist, scholar, and community leader active during the early 20th century.

== Early life ==
Avloniy was born on 12 July 1878, in the Mergancha neighborhood of Tashkent. Due to economic difficulties in his family, he engaged in various occupations from a young age, such as farming, hide tanning, blacksmithing, carpentry, and gardening. During his childhood, he began his education at the Madrasa in O`qchi neighborhood at the age of 12. He started writing poetry according to the prevailing fashion from the age of 14. He initially attended an old-style school and later continued his education in the madrasa (1885–1895). After completing his studies at the madrasa, he became a teacher. He closely followed newspapers and journals while he was living in Orenburg, Kazan, and Tiflis.

== Activity ==
At the beginning of the 20th century, Avloniy became involved in the Jadidist movement. In 1904, Avloniy opened a Jadid school in Mirabad. He started publishing his poetry in 1906. Avloniy learned Arabic, Persian, and Russian, and translated works by thinkers and writers such as Leo Tolstoy and Konstantin Ushinsky into Uzbek. In 1906, he founded the "Taraqqiy" magazine, and in 1907, he published the "Shuhrat" newspaper from his home. After these publications were shut down, he started the "Osiyo" newspaper in a clandestine manner in 1908. However, the government later suppressed this newspaper as well. Avloniy was the first to suggest teaching subjects like chemistry, geography, physics, and astronomy in schools. He worked to promote education by establishing a school for local children in the Mirobod neighborhood of Tashkent in 1908. He also taught subjects like language and literature. In 1909, he founded the "Jamiyati xayriya" to educate orphans. In the same year, he published the first volume of a collection of his poetic works titled "Adabiyot yoxud milliy sheʼrlar" (Literature or National Poems). In 1912, Avloniy opened a two-grade school in Tashkent's "Degrez mahalla." This school differed from conventional schools in that it offered worldly subjects.

Avloniy wrote textbooks and teaching materials for new schools and published them, including "Birinchi muallim" in 1911, "Ikkinchi muallim" in 1912, "Turkiy guliston yoxud axloq" in 1913, "Adabiyot yoxud milliy sheʼrlar" collection from 1909 to 1915, "Maktab gulistoni" in 1915, "Mardikorlar ashuvlasi" in 1917, and others. He, along with intellectuals like Munawwar Qari, Muhammadjon Podshoxoʻjayev, Tavallo, Rustambek Yusufbekov, Nizomiddin Xoʻjayev, Shokirjon Rahimiy, co-founded the "Nashriyot" (Publishing) company in 1914 and the "Maktab" (School) company in 1916. Avloniy also used his theatrical knowledge to uplift the people, forming the "Turkiston" theater troupe in 1913. He translated and staged several plays from 1910 to 1916. His plays were performed in cities like Tashkent, Fergana, Andijon, Kokand, and Khujand, offering a vivid portrayal of Turkestan's life in the early 20th century. Avloniy's theater troupe included talented actors like Mannon Uygʻur, Hamza, and Azerbaijani playwrights Uzayr Hojibekov, and Ruhullo. However, after the October Revolution, the promise of freedom and independence for the people was not fulfilled, which led to a sense of disillusionment reflected in his poem "Xafalik soatda" (In the Time of Trouble) in 1919.

In 1917, Avloniy published the "Turon" newspaper, which covered political and social events. In 1918, he played a key role in establishing the "Ishtirokiyun" newspaper and became its editor. From 1919 to 1920, he served as the political representative and consul of the Soviet government in Afghanistan. He also worked as the Minister of Public Education in Afghanistan. He was the chief editor of the "Kasabachilik harakati" (Craftsmen's Movement) journal in 1921. From 1921, Avloniy dedicated himself to opening schools, educating the people, teaching Uzbek girls, and training teachers. He served as the head of women's and men's educational institutions (inpros) in Eski Shahar from 1923 to 1924, a teacher at the Tashkent Military School from 1924 to 1929, and the head of the Language and Literature Department at the Central Asian State University (now the National University of Uzbekistan) from 1930 to 1934. During this time, he compiled and published an "Adabiyot xrestomatiyasi" (Literary Reader) for the 7th grade of Uzbek schools in 1933. Avloniy has around 4,000 lines of poetry, characterized by his critical and scholarly approach, written under pen names like Hijron, Nabil, Indamas, Shuhrat, Tangriquli, Surayyo, Shapaloq, Chol, Ab, Chigʻaboy, and Abdulhaq.

Avloniy passed away in Tashkent on 25 August 1934, at the age of 56, and was buried in the Botkin Street Cemetery.

== Works ==
"Advokatlik osonmi" (1914), "Pinak" (1916), "Biz va siz" (1917), "Portugaliya inqilobi", "Ikki muhabbat", "Boʻron", parables like "Tulki ila qargʻa," "Mardikorlar ashulasi", "Vatan"(1916), "Maktab", "Bogʻcha", "Yalqov shogird tilidan", "Togʻlardan bir manzara", "Millatga xitob", "Ishchilara tortuq", "Koʻklam keldi", "Tovush", and other poems, as well as articles like "Maqsad va maslak"(9 April 1908), "Holimizga doir" (14 February 1908), and the allegorical story "Hasad balosi".

== Published works ==
- Avloniy. "Toshkent tongi" (Tashkent), 1978.
- Avloniy. "Oʻson millat" (Tashkent), 1993.
- Avloniy. "Turkiy guliston yohud axloq" (Tashkent), 1992.
- Avloniy. "Afgʻon sayohati. Kundaliklar." "Sharq yulduzi," 1990, Issue 7.
- "Milliy uygʻonish" (National Revival), (Tashkent), 1993.
- Avloniy. "Tanlangan asarlar," Two volumes, "Maʼnaviyat," (Tashkent), 1998.

== Family ==
In 1900, Avloniy married a girl named Salomatxon from a merchant family in Tashkent. They had seven children together, namely Savriniso, Karima, Kunduz, Hakima, Asadilla, Otaliq, and Kenja.

== Awards ==
- In 1927, he was awarded the title of "Hero of Labor".
- In 1930, he was awarded the title of "Uzbekistan is a master of public education"
- In 2020, he was honored with the "Order of Outstanding Merit" Order.

== Memory ==
While Avloniy was not imprisoned or treated as an enemy of the people, his works remained unpublished until 1966. It was after his death that Begali Qosimov researched and wrote the book "Abdulla Avloniy" to uncover his literary legacy. In 1968, the Abdulla Avloniy Memorial Museum was established. In Tashkent, there is a street named after Avloniy, as well as two neighborhoods, a cultural center, and a national research institute dedicated to his name. In 2019, a film titled "Avloniy" was premiered, depicting Avloniy's missions in Afghanistan. The poet Muhammad Ali portrayed Abdulla Avloniy as one of the characters in his epic novel "Boqiy dunyo" (The Eternal World) in 1979. In the Writers' Garden in Tashkent, there is a statue of Avloniy.

== Literatures ==
- N. Toʻxliyev va boshqalar (2009). Toshkent ensiklopediyasi. Toshkent: „Oʻzbekiston milliy ensiklopediyasi" davlat ilmiy nashriyoti. p. 784.
- Oltinbek Olim (2022). Jadid adabiyoti namoyondalari: Abdulla Avloniy. „Zabarjad media". p. 432.
- Abdulla Avloniy, "Toshkent tongi" (Prepared for publication by B. Qosimov). Toshkent: G'afur G'ulom named Literature and Art Publishing House, 1979.
- Abdulla Avloniy. "Afg'on sayohati" (Afghan Journeys). "Sharq yulduzi" journal, 1990, Issue 7.
- Abdulla Avloniy. "Turkiy guliston yoxud axloq" (Turkestan or the People) (Prepared for publication by M. Maxsumov). Toshkent: O'qituvchi, 1992.
- Abdulla Avloniy. "O'son, millat" (Easy, Nation). Toshkent: Sharq, 1993.
- Abdulla Avloniy. "Muxtasar tarixi anbiyo va tarixi Islom" (A Brief History of Prophets and the History of Islam). Toshkent: Fan, 1994.
- Abdulla Avloniy. "Tanlangan asarlar" (Selected Works). Two volumes (Prepared for publication by B. Qosimov). Toshkent: Ma'naviyat, 1998.
- Abdulla Avloniy. "Turkiy guliston yoxud axloq" (Turkestan or the People) (Translated to modern Uzbek by O. Oltinbek). Toshkent: Sano-standard, 2012.
- Qosimov B. "Abdulla Avloniy, Toshkent," 1979.
- Qosimov B. "Milliy uyg'onish" (National Revival). Toshkent: Manaviyat, 2002.
- Qosimov B. "Uyg'ongan millat ma'rifati" (The Knowledge of the Enlightened Nation). Toshkent: Ma'naviyat, 2011.
- Qosimov B., Dolimov U. "Ma'rifat darg'alari" (Knowledge Treasures). Toshkent: O'qituvchi, 1990.
- Dolimov U. "Turkistonda jadid maktablari" (Jadid Schools in Turkestan). Toshkent: Universitet, 2006.
- Rizayev Sh. "Jadid dramasi" (Jadid Drama). Toshkent: Sharq, 1997.
- Do'stqorayev B. "O'zbekiston jurnalistikasi tarixi" (History of Journalism in Uzbekistan). Toshkent: G'afur G'ulom named Literature and Art Publishing House, 2009.
- Barakayev R. "O'zbek bolalar adabiyoti va Abdulla Avloniy ijodi" (Uzbek Children's Literature and the Literary Works of Abdulla Avloniy). Toshkent: Fan, 2004.
- Karim, Bahodir. "Avloniy ziyosi." "Til va adabiyot ta'limi jumali," 2020, Issue 7.
- Saidov U, "Yevropa maʼrifatchiligi va Milliy uyg'onish" (European Enlightenment and National Revival). Toshkent: Akademiya, 2004.
- Said, Ziyo. "Tanlangan asarlar" (Selected Works). Toshkent: G'afur G'ulom named Literature and Art Publishing House, 1974.
