= Viktor Dukhovny =

Soviet and Uzbekistani water engineer and scholar (1934–2021)

- Born: Viktor Abramovich Dukhovny; April 20, 1934; Ukraine SSR
- Died: August 14, 2021 (aged 87); Tashkent, Uzbekistan
- Education: Kyiv Hydromelioration Institute
- Awards: Order of the Red Banner of Labour (in 1966 and 1971); Order of Friendship of Peoples (1981)
- Scientific career
- Fields: Water engineering, hydrology
- Workplaces: Scientific Research Institute of Irrigation and Water Problems; SIC ICWC

Viktor Abramovich Dukhovny (Russian: Виктор Абрамович Духовный; 20 April 1934 – 14 August 2021) was a Soviet and Uzbekistani water engineer and scholar. He played a major role in the development and construction of several large-scale hydraulic projects in Central Asia. Dukhovny supported large-scale hydraulic projects, including the proposed diversion of Siberian rivers to Central Asia in wake of the Aral Sea disaster during the Soviet period, which was later abandoned.

In 1972, he became director of the Scientific Research Institute of Irrigation and Water Problems, then known as the Central Asian Scientific Research Institute of Irrigation (SANIIRI), and oversaw its development into one of the region's leading water research institutions. In 1992, he contributed to the establishment of the Interstate Commission for Water Coordination of Central Asia (ICWC) and headed its Scientific Information Center (SIC ICWC) from its establishment.

He authored numerous scientific works and supervised 11 PhD candidates. His achievements were recognized with two Orders of the Red Banner of Labour (in 1966 and 1971), the Order of Friendship of Peoples (1981), the USSR Council of Ministers Prize (1979), and several other medals.

Dukhovny died in August 2021 in Tashkent, Uzbekistan. In 2024, on the occasion of the 90th anniversary of his birth, the SIC ICWC published an edited volume titled "...Ya sluzhil i lyudyam, i vode..." (Russian: «...Я служил и людям, и воде...», lit. '"...I served both people and water..."') dedicated to his life and work.
