= Muhammad Salih (historian) =

Uzbekistani historian and poet

Muhammad Solih
- Born: Muhammad Solih ibn Amir Nursaidbek; 1455; Khorezm
- Died: 1535 (aged 79–80); Bukhara
- Other names: Amir ul-ulama, Malik ush-shuara
- Occupations: Poet, historian, governor
- Years active: 1464-1535
- Known for: Writing the first realistic historical epic in the history of Uzbek literature
- Notable work: Shaybaninama

Muhammad Solih (1455, Khorezm — 1535, Bukhara) was a poet and historian of the Shaybanid era who wrote in the old Uzbek language.

== Life ==
He was born in the family of Amir Nursaidbek, the ruler of Khorezm, from the Bilkut tribe of the Turks. His grandfather Shohmalik Mirzo had great influence in the palace of Shahrukh and Ulugbek. His father Nursaidbek served in the palaces of Ulugbek and Abu Said. Muhammad Solih initially studied in Khorezm and then went to Herat, where he studied from Aburahmon Jomi. Between 1464 and 1467, Nursaidbek ruled the Khorezm, but in 1467 he was accused of treachery by the order of Abu Said and killed. Muhammad Solih, who lost his father at the age of 10, faced many difficulties in his youth. He even had to serve for a while in the palace of Husayn Bayqara and other Timurids. However, he did not want to work with the Timurids who caused his father’s death. Later, in 1494, he worked under Darvish Muhammad tarxon and Khoja Muhammad Yahyo, the son of Khoja Ahror, in Samarkand, and in 1499 he entered the service of Shaybanikhan. He participated in his campaigns and helped him to capture the fortresses of Bukhara and Dabusiya. He met with the defenders of the fortresses and urged them to ally with Shaybanikhan.

In the summer of 1500, after a three-day siege, Muhammad Shaybanikhan conquered Bukhara and appointed Muhammad Solih as the governor of Bukhara, and also gave him several lands from Khorezm. The historian later ruled in Chorjoy and Nisa provinces. He was awarded the titles of “Amir ul-ulama” and “Malik ush-shuara”. He lived in Herat in 1507-10. After the death of Shaybanikhan, he returned to Bukhara. Later, he served as the secretary of the Shaybanids Mahmud Sultan and Ubaydullakhan until the end of his life. Muhammad Solih wrote in Turkish and Persian. His poems mainly covered love, biographical, and political themes. He wrote the first realistic historical epic in the history of Uzbek literature - “Shaybaninama”. Muhammad Sultan died in Bukhara in 1535.

== Information given in the book “Shaybaninama” ==
The historical epic “Shaybaninama” written by Muhammad Solih tells the story of Muhammad Shaybanikhan’s life and bloody wars in poetic style. The work begins with the birth of Shaybanikhan and covers the events that took place until 1505. The epic also contains valuable information about the composition of the armies, the hard situation of the common people, and the rebellions against the Shaybanids in Qorako’l, Qarshi and Guzor. The work also contains many geographic and ethnographic names. The epic consists of 8880 verses and 76 chapters and was completed in 1510. This work, which reflects the events of the late 15th and early 16th centuries, is of great importance in terms of historical, ethnographic, geographic, linguistic, and artistic aspects. The original manuscript of the epic has not been found, but a handwritten copy made by Qosim scribe in 1510 is kept in Venice. The book was translated into German (1885), Russian (1904) and other languages. It was published in Petersburg in 1908 and in Tashkent in 1961-1989. Vamberi reported that Muhammad Solih had a Turkish epic called “Laylo va Majnun”, but it has not been found. “Qomus ul-a’lom” and “Noz va Niyoz” poems are considered to be one of Muhammad Solih’s works, but Nisoriy in his “Muzakkiri ahbob” mentions Baqoiy as the author of these works.
