= Habib Abdullayev =

Soviet geologist and politician (1912–1962)

Habib Abdullayev Ҳабиб Абдуллаев,
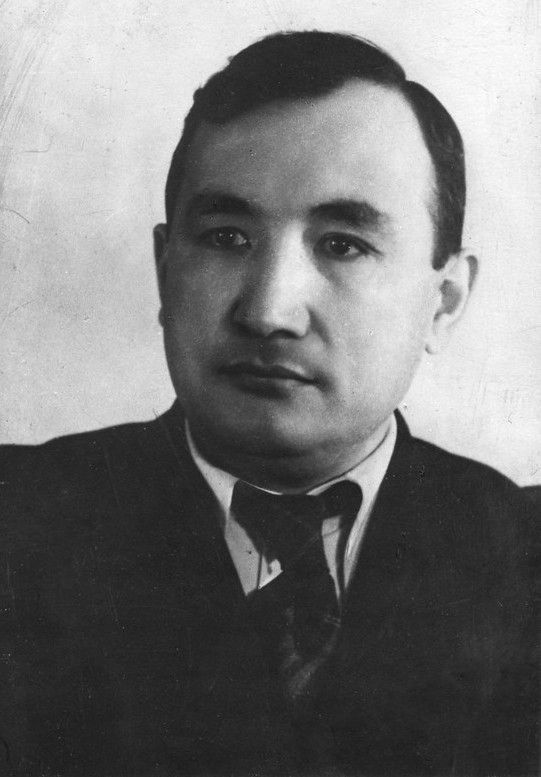
- Born: 31 July [O.S. 18 July] 1912; Aravan, Governorate-General of Turkestan, Russian Empire (present-day Kyrgyzstan)
- Died: 20 June 1962 (aged 49); Tashkent, Uzbek SSR, USSR
- Education: Doctor of Geological and Mineralogical Sciences; Central Asian Industrial Institute
- Awards: Order of Lenin

Habib Muhammedovich Abdullayev (Uzbek Cyrillic: Ҳабиб Муҳаммедович Абдуллаев, Russian: Хабиб Мухаммедович Абдуллаев, Khabib Mukhammedovich Abdullaev; 31 July [O.S. 18 July] 1912 — 20 June 1962) was a Soviet-Uzbek geologist and politician who led the Academy of Sciences of the Uzbek SSR from 1956 to 1962 and served as chairman of the Council of Ministers of the Uzbek SSR. His son, Pulat Abdullayev, became a diplomat.

== Early life ==
Born on 31 July [O.S. 18 July] 1912 in Aravan to an Uzbek peasant family, he worked as a farmer starting when he was only twelve years old, but in 1929 he was made head of the district committee of the Komsomol. When he turned 18 he was chosen to be sent to study in Tashkent. There, he chose to study geology, and went on to graduate from the Central Asian Industrial Institute in 1935. Upon graduating from the institute as an engineer-geologist, he headed a geological expedition to study the Langar tungsten-molybdenum deposits in the Uzbek SSR. He then taught at the Geological Prospecting University in Moscow until 1939. That year, he successfully defended his thesis.

== Academic career ==
In 1940, he returned to Tashkent, where he worked at the Central Asian Polytechnic Institute as an assistant professor in the Minerals Department of the Faculty of Mining. His main field of study focused on the formation of igneous rocks and ore deposits, and he played a major role in the establishment of geology studies and field research in the Uzbek SSR. In 1943 he became a corresponding member of the Academy of Sciences of the Uzbek SSR in 1943, became full member and vice president of it in 1947; that year, his doctoral thesis that he defended in 1946 was published.

He was appointed vice-president of the Academy of Sciences in 1947, and held that position until 1955. Meanwhile, he headed the geology institute, from 1947 to 1949 and from 1952 to 1955, he worked as chairman of the Department of Technical and Geochemical Sciences. In October 1956 he became the president of the Academy of Sciences of the Uzbek SSR, and in 1958 he became a Corresponding member of the Academy of Sciences of the USSR. He held a variety of memberships in academic organizations, including the Geological Society of France and the Mineralogical Society of Great Britain and Ireland. His main field of study focused on the formation of igneous rocks and ore deposits. He was removed from his as president of the Academy of Sciences of the Uzbek SSR shortly before his death in 1962. During his career, he authored over 100 academic papers as well as seven monographs.

== Political career ==
Having become a member of the Communist Party in 1941, he held a variety of high offices in the government in addition to his academic posts. From 1942 to 1984 he was a deputy chairman of the Council of People's Commissars of the Uzbek SSR. In addition, he was chairman of the State Planning Committee of the Uzbek SSR from 1944 to 1948 He was a deputy in the Supreme Soviet of the Uzbek SSR in the 4th convocation (1955-1959) and the Supreme Soviet of the USSR in the 5th convocation (1958-1962), as well as a delegate at the XXI Congress of the CPSU in 1959. In 1956, he was elected to the Central Committee of the Communist Party of the Uzbek SSR.

== Awards ==
- Order of Lenin (11 January 1957)
- Two Order of the Red Banner of Labour (16 January 1950, ?)
- Three Order of the Red Star
- Order of the Badge of Honour
- State Biruni Prize (1970)
- Order of Outstanding Merit (23 August 2002)
