= Sobir Yunusov =

Soviet-Uzbek chemist

Sobir Yunusovich Yunusov (Russian: Сабир Юнусович Юнусов; 18 March 1909 in Tashkent – 29 November 1995 in Tashkent) was a Soviet-Uzbek chemist, known for his research in alkaloid chemistry. In 1971 he was awarded the D.I. Mendeleev Medal for doing so. He founded the Institute of the Chemistry of Plant Substances under the Academy of Sciences of the Uzbek SSR (of Uzbekistan since 1991) in 1956. The institute currently bears his name. He was a corresponding member of the Academy of Sciences of the USSR (of Russia since 1991) from 1958 until his death. He died and was buried in Tashkent, Uzbekistan. He was posthumously awarded the Order of Outstanding Merit.

== See also ==
- Muhammad Solih (historian)
