= Tesha Zohidov =

Uzbek zoologist

Tesha Zohidov Теша Зоҳидов
- Born: 23 May [O.S. 10 May] 1906; Kokand, Russian Empire
- Died: 21 August 1981 (aged 75; Tashkent, Uzbek SSR, USSR
- Education: Central Asia State University
- Awards: Order of Lenin

Tesha Zohidovich Zohidov (Uzbek Cyrillic: Теша Зоҳидович Зоҳидов, Russian: Тиша Захидович Захидов, Tisha Zakhidovich Zakhidov) was a Soviet-Uzbek zoologist, ecologist, and politician who served as president of the Academy of Sciences of the Uzbek SSR from 1952 to 1956.

== Early life and education ==
Zohidov was born on 23 May [O.S. 10 May] 1906 to an impoverished Uzbek family in Kokand. When he was only ten years old he began working at a print shop as an apprentice, although after the Soviet presence in the region increased he began attending a local school. After completing initial schooling in Kokand in 1924 he continued his education at the Tashkent Pedagogical College named after Narimonov, which he graduated from in 1926. That year, he entered Central Asia State University in 1926. Upon graduating from Central Asia State University in 1931, he became working for the Department of Vertebrate Zoology, where he worked as a researcher until 1949 when he became a professor. Back in 1939, he became a member of the Communist Party.

== Career ==
In 1943, the People's Commissariat of the Uzbek SSR asked the university to conduct a comprehensive survey of a Southeast portion of the Kyzylkum Desert. The project, dubbed the "South Kyzylkum Complex Expedition", was led by Yevgeny Korotin (working as a botanist) and Zohidov (working as a zoologist). The field work lasted from 15 March to 10 December 1943, and academic literature from the project was first published in 1945, although some works were not published until a decade later. Most of his works focused on vertebrates that lived in the desert areas of the Uzbek SSR, especially in the Karakum Desert.

From 1946 to 1952 he served as deputy director of the Institute of Botany and Zoology of the Academy of Sciences of the Uzbek SSR. Meanwhile, he became a professor in 1949. In 1952 he became a member of the Academy of Sciences of the Uzbek SSR. That year, he became its president, a post he held until 1956. He then worked on zoology encyclopedia, for which he was awarded the Beruniy state prize in 1971.

He died on 21 August 1981 in Tashkent.

== Awards ==
- Order of Lenin
- Order of the October Revolution
- Three Order of the Red Banner of Labour
- Order of the Badge of Honour
- Beruniy State Prize (1970)
- Honored Scientist and Technologist of the Uzbek SSR (1950)
