= Shia Islam in Uzbekistan =

Shi'a Islam in Uzbekistan is a small minority sect, composed almost entirely of ethnic-Iranians. There are only three registered Shi'a mosques in the country, two in Samarkand and one in Bukhara; both of these cities have residents of Iranian descent.

== Pre-Soviet history ==
Historian Jed Snyder notes that prior to the Russian invasions at the end of the 1800s, skirmishes were "not uncommon" between Shi'a and Sunni factions in Samarkand. He notes, however, that the Shi'a were largely assimilated by the Sunni in the period following Russian occupation.

== Current discrimination ==
Though the government has allowed these registered Shi'a mosques to operate, some Uzbek Shi'a are concerned that the government prevents the registration of new Shi'a mosques, and that the official national religious body, the Spiritual Administration of Muslims in Uzbekistan, has no Shi'a representation. Further, since the Soviet era there have been no Shi'a madrassas in the nation, and no new ones have been registered since independence. Those seeking to become Shi'a religious leaders can only obtain a Shi'a education by going to Iran, but Shi'a credentials received in Iran are not recognised by the Uzbek government, leaving a dearth of officially recognised Shi'a leadership.
