= Komiljon Otaniyozov =

Komiljon Otaniyozov Komiljon Otaniyozov / Камилджан Атаниязов
- Born: July 20, 1917; Khorazm Region, Uzbekistan, Uzbek SSR
- Died: November 5, 1975 (aged 58)
- Genres: Traditional music
- Occupations: instrumentalist, singer, songwriter and music composer
- Instruments: Tar (string instrument)
- Years active: 1930-1975
- Awards: Order of Outstanding Merit; Order of the Badge of Honor

Komiljon Otaniyozov (Uzbek Cyrillic: Комилжон Отаниёзов, Russian: Камилджан Атаниязов; 20 July 1917 — 5 November 1975) was an Uzbek instrumentalist, singer, songwriter and music composer. He is the People's Artist of Uzbekistan. He has been an influential figure in Uzbek cultural life for almost five decades. Much of his most celebrated work dates from the 1930s and 1970s.

Komiljon Otaniyozov's lyrics have incorporated a variety of social, philosophical, and traditional life influences. Some of his lyrics have become part of everyday Uzbek vocabulary. While usually writes both the music and lyrics to his songs, he has also used lines from the poems of Ali-Shir Nava'i, Babur, Jami, and society's folklore in his songs.

== Life ==
Komiljon Otaniyozov was born in 1917 in Khorazm Region, Uzbekistan, then the Uzbek SSR, USSR. Komiljon Otaniyozov graduated from the state conservatory of Uzbekistan in 1956. He learned from Abdullayev Qurbonnazar and Matpano Khudoyberganov.

== Professional career ==
From 1936 until 1952, Komiljon Otaniyozov worked as an actor in national theatres in Khorazm. From 1949 on, he made concerts initially in Khorazm then throughout Uzbekistan. From 1957 to 1975, he worked as a single singer at the Uzbek State Philharmonic.

Throughout his long career, Otaniyozov has written and recorded hundreds of songs. As a musical composer, Komiljon Otaniyozov made some outstanding pieces of music such as "Salom, senga Xorazmdan" (Greetings, from Khorazm), "Muborak", "Vatan", "Olqish", "Temir yoʻl", "Oʻzbekiston", "Xorazm".
