= Lazgi (film) =

Uzbek film

- Directed by: Ixtiyor Baxtiyorov
- Screenplay by: Ixtiyor Baxtiyorov; Muyassar Matkarimova; Baxtiyor Matakrimov
- Produced by: Ixtiyor Baxtiyorov; Muhammad Bobur Xoʻdjayev
- Starring: Avzal Rafiqov
- Cinematography: Okhun Sharipov
- Music by: Azamat Raximov
- Release date: 12 September 2021
- Country: Uzbekistan
- Languages: Uzbek; English; Russian

Lazgi is a 2021 Uzbek experimental documentary film written and directed by Ixtiyor Baxtiyorov. It was a joint project supported by the Ministry of Tourism and Sports of Uzbekistan at the time and UNESCO. The film Lazgi is a winner of the international competitions “Art Stream,” “Fifflondon,” “Blackboard,” “Lift-Off Season Awards,” and “IFFF.”

The premiere of the series will take place in Uzbekistan on September 12, 2021. The world premiere took place on September 14, 2021.

== Plot ==
On the history and cultural heritage of the Khorezmian dance "Lazgi," which has been inscribed on the UNESCO Representative List of the Intangible Cultural Heritage of Humanity.

== Creation ==
The screenplay for the film Lazgi was written in 2020. The filming process was slightly delayed due to the COVID-19 pandemic and was completed in 2021.

=== Casting ===
A casting was held to select the voice actor for the film, with numerous candidates participating. As a result of the casting, Afzal Rafiqov was selected to provide the voice-over.

=== Filming ===
According to reports, principal photography for the film began in 2021 during the quarantine period, with filming taking place in Tashkent, Khorezm, and Karakalpakstan.

== Cast ==
- Avzal Rafiqov

== Awards and nominations ==
Year	Premium	Nomination	Result	Source
2022	Art Stream Film Festival Moskva	Best Short Documentary Film About Dance	Won	
2022	FIFFLondon London	Audience Award / Best Film by Audience Choice	Won	
2022	Blackboard International Film Festival	Best Documentary Film About Dance	Won	
2022	Lift-Off Season Awards Hindiston	One of the Best Films About Dance	Won	
2022	IFFT International Film Festival of Thrissour	Best Documentary Film About Dance	Won	

== Sound post-production ==
The music for the film "Lazgi" was written by Azamat Raximov.

=== Soundtrack ===
Lazgi

Soundtrack album
- Released: 2021
- Recorded: 2021
- Genre: Film soundtrack
- Length: 4:15
- Language: Uzbek
- Label: BIB films

chronology
Azamat Raximov (2021)	Lazgi (2021)	Azamat Raximov (2021)

Azamat Raximov was hired to compose the original soundtrack and music by Lazgi.
