= Munawwar Qari =

Turkestani Jadidist intellectual (1878–1931)

- منور قارى ابن عبد الرشيد خان; Munavvarqori Abdurashidxon oʻgʻli; Мунаввар Қори Абдурашидхон ўғли
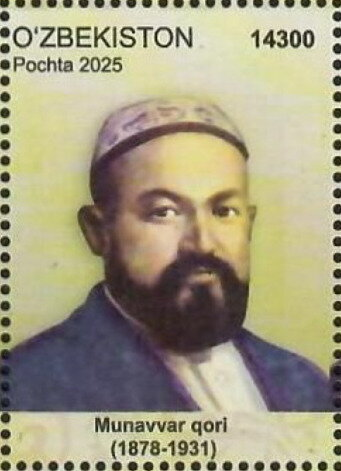
- Qari on a 2026 stamp of Uzbekistan
- Born: 1878; Tashkent, Russian Turkestan (now Uzbekistan)
- Died: 1931 (aged 52–53); Moscow, Russian SFSR, Soviet Union (now Russia)
- Occupations: Teacher, theorist, journalist, educator, writer, and scholar
- Writing career
- Movement: Jadidism

Munawwar Qari Abdurrashidkhan ogli (Uzbek: Munavvarqori Abdurashidxon oʻgʻli, Cyrillic: Мунаввар Қори Абдурашидхон ўғли, Arabic: منور قارى ابن عبد الرشيد خان; 1878 – 1931) was a prominent Jadid in Russian Turkestan. Like other Jadids, Munnawwar Qari worked as author, poet, teacher, journalist and in other occupations.

== Life ==
Munawwar Qari was of an ethnic Uzbek origin. He was the youngest child in a family of Islamic scholars and received his education in Tashkent and Bukhara. In 1901, he opened Tashkent's first Maktab to follow the Jadids' new method of teaching. He also wrote textbooks for use in schools and published literary works of other authors, while publishing and editing The Sun, one of the first independent newspapers in Russian Turkestan.

After the Russian Revolution, he continued working as a teacher, but was arrested and deported to a Gulag camp in 1925 and shot in 1931 after being convicted for "counter-revolutionary activities". His grave can be found in Moscow's Yagankovo cemetery.

== Education ==
Since his father was left a young orphan, he received his initial education from his mother. He learned the science of recitation and Tajweed from his teacher Osman Domla, and memorized the Qur'an. He studied at the Yunuskhan madrasa in Tashkent. In 1885–1890, he studied at the Mir-i-Arab madrasa in Bukhara, but did not finish his studies and returned to Tashkent to work as an imam and teacher. He continued his studies at the Eshonquli Dodxoh madrasa.

== Scientific and political activity ==
In 1901, he opened a new-style school and developed a special curriculum and textbooks for these schools. He started teaching in 1903 when the new schools were established. For these schools, he wrote "Adibi Avval" ("First Writer," 1907), a textbook for learning the alphabet, and "Adibi Soniy" ("Second Writer," 1907). In these, "Himmatli Faqir" poem is included, and educational books were published several times. From 1904, he became involved in social, political, and cultural life. From 1906, he worked as a literary contributor for the "Oʻrta Osiyoning Umurguzorligi", and "Taraqqiy" newspapers. That year, he founded the "Xurshid" newspaper as an editor and a writer. In 1908, his collection "Sabzazor," "Yer Yuzi" (about geography), and "Tajvidal Qurʼon" (teaching the Quran) books were published and used as textbooks in new-style schools. He also managed the "Shuhrat" (1907), "Tujjor" (1907), and "Osiyo" (1908) newspapers and carried out the duties of a literary contributor. Later, he worked as the responsible editor in the "Sadoyi Turkiston" (1914–1915) newspaper, the confidential editor in "Al-Islah" journal (1915–1917), and as a responsible editor in the "Najot" and "Kengash" (1917) newspapers. He, along with intellectuals like Abdulla Avloniy, Nizomiddin Xoʻjayev, Muhammadjon Podshoxoʻjayev, Tavallo, Rustambek Yusufbekov, Shokirjon Rahimiy, co-founded the "Nashriyot" (Publishing) company in 1914 and the "Maktab" (School) company in 1916.

Munawwar Qari was an organizer of various societies and associations. He was a founder, editor, head, and member of various societies, organizations, partnerships, and associations, such as "Jamiyati Imdodiya" (1909), "Turon" (1913), "Turkiston Kutubxonasi" (1914), "Umid" (1914), and "Koʻmak" (1921). During the government of the Shuro leaders, he was the head of the People's Enlightenment of the People's Educational Commission (1918), the head of Tashkent city's public education department, a delegate and a member of the East People's Congress (1920, Bukhara). He was the head of the BXSR Public Enlightenment and Waqf Department (1920–1921), the head of the Tashkent city's social education department (1921), a teacher at the Navoiy School and the Narimonov Pedagogical Technical Institute (1923–1925), a scientific worker at the museum in Samarkand, and a responsible secretary of the Tashkent-Fergana branch of the Uzbekistan Antiquities Preservation Committee (1927–1928).

== Published textbooks ==
- "Adibi avval" (1907)
- "Adib us-soniy" (1907)
- "Usuli hisob" (1911)
- "Tarixi qavm turk" (1911)
- "Tajvid" (1911)
- "Havoyiji diniya" (1912)
- "Tarixi anbiyo" (1912)
- "Tarixi islomiya" (1912)
- "Yer yuzi" (1916—1917)

The textbook "Oʻzbekcha til saboqligi" (compiled in four parts by Shorasul Zunnun and Qayum Ramazon, 1925–1926) has been published several times.

In 1914, a collection of poems by progressive Uzbek poets was published under the name "Sabzavor." Munawwar Qari Abdurrashidkhan was engaged not only in socio-pedagogical activities but also in literary creation.

Throughout his activities, Munawwar Qari wasn't restricted to pedagogy, journalism, editing, and literature but also engaged in political activities, which led to multiple detentions by the government. He advocated for the adoption of European trade and industry, the advancement of science, and the cultivation of spiritual enlightenment. He actively fought against the policies of the Khanates and the Emirate, which leaned towards capitalism. He led the Enlightenment of Islam organization and ideologically guided society, sects, and organizations such as "Turkiston" National Autonomy, "Ittihod va Taraqqiyot", "Milliy Ittihod", and "Nashri Ma'rifat". He was a proponent of conscience freedom and supported the idea of a worldly democratic state. This is why he supported the Turkestan Autonomy (1917) formed in the city of Kokand.

== Family ==
He was born into an Uzbek noble family in the Darxon neighborhood of Shaykhantakhur district in Tashkent city. His father, Abdurashidxon Sotiboldixon, was a teacher, and his mother, Khosiyat, was the daughter of the teacher Xonxoʻja Shorahimxoʻja. He was the third son in the family. Munawwar Qari received his initial education from his parents and the neighborhood school. Additionally, his elder brothers, Aʼzamxon (1872–1919) and Muslimxon (1875–1954), also provided him with instruction.

== Death ==
On 6 November 1929, Munawwar Qari was accused of unjust nationalism and imprisoned. He was executed in Butirka prison in Moscow and buried in Vagankova cemetery. He was officially rehabilitated in 1991.

== See also ==
- Mahmudkhodja Behbudiy

== Literature ==
- Adeeb Khalid: The Politics of Muslim Cultural Reform: Jadidism in Central Asia, Berkeley 1998.
- Charles Kurzman: Modernist Islam, 1840–1940. A Sourcebook, New York 2002, p. 227.
- Edward Allworth: Central Asia. 120 Years of Russian Rule, London 1989.
