= Maqsud Shayxzoda =

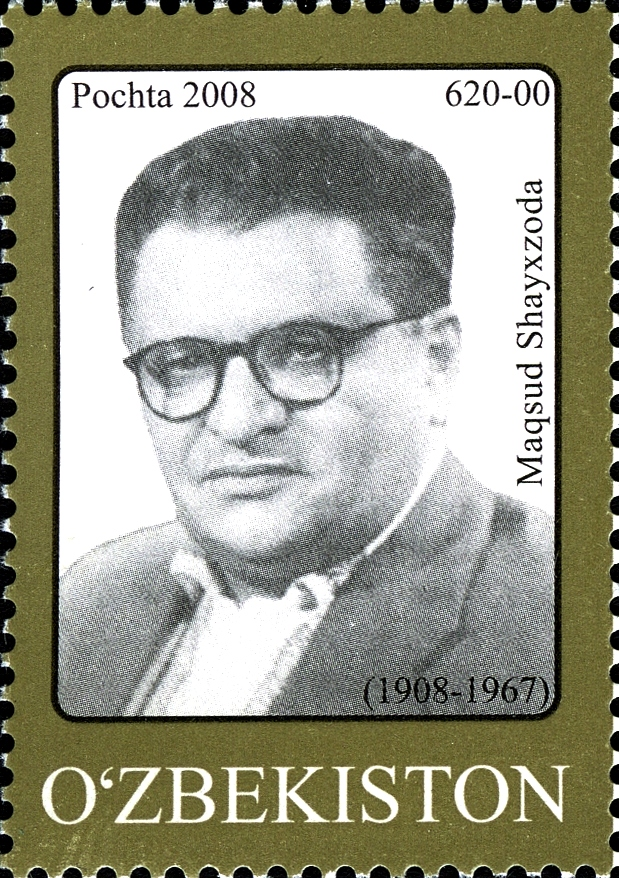
- Born: October 25, 1908; Aghdash, Aresh uezd, Yelizavetpol Governorate, Russian Empire (now Oqtosh, Azerbaijan)
- Died: February 19, 1967 (aged 58); Tashkent, Uzbek SSR, USSR
- Occupations: Writer, poet, playwright, literary and linguistic scholar, translator, educator
- Years active: 1929–1967
- Awards: Order of the Badge of Honour (25 December 1944); Order of Outstanding Merit (2001)

Maqsud Shayxzoda (Azerbaijani: Maqsud Şeyxzadə, Uzbek: Maqsud Shayxzoda; 7 November 1908 — 19 February 19, 1967, in Tashkent, Uzbek SSR) was a Soviet-Uzbek poet of Azerbaijani Turk origin. He is considered one of the founders of modern Uzbek literature. He was the brother of Fuad Shikhiev and hailed from the village of Yukhari Salahli in the Qazax district, although he was born in Aghdash.

In 1925, Maqsud Shayxzoda graduated from the Darulmuallim School in Baku. He initially worked as a teacher in a first-degree Azerbaijani school in Derbent and later taught at the Buynaksk Pedagogical and Educational Technical School. In 1927, he was arrested for alleged membership in a counter-revolutionary organization and was exiled to Tashkent in February 1928. Shayxzoda briefly studied at the Faculty of Oriental Studies at the Central Asian University (1928), later working at the editorial offices of Sharq Haqiqati (1929–32), Qizil Uzbekistan and Yosh Leninchi newspapers (1932), and the Gulistan journal (1933–34). In 1933, he passed exams for all courses at the Pedagogical Institute in Baku and enrolled in postgraduate studies (1934). He also worked as a researcher at the Institute of Language and Literature (1935–38). From 1938 until his death, he lectured on the history of Uzbek literature at the Pedagogical Institute, initially in evening classes and later in daytime classes.

Shayxzoda authored about 30 poetry collections, as well as the verse dramas Jalal ad-Din Manguberdi and Mirza Ulugh Beg, both considered landmarks in Uzbek dramaturgy. He also wrote over 200 scholarly articles, critical essays, journalistic pieces, and a monograph titled The Great Poet about Ali-Shir Nava'i.

== Life ==
Maqsud Shayxzoda, son of Masim Bey, was born on 7 November 1908 in Aghdash, then part of the Yelizavetpol Governorate. His father, Masim Shikhliyev, originally from the Salahli region of Qazakh, studied medicine in Tbilisi and later served as a health official in Aghdash. According to literary historian Tokhtasin Jalalov, his home became a cultural hub where discussions on literature, philosophy, and politics were held, shaping young Maqsud’s early exposure to classical authors like Pushkin, Shakespeare, Ferdowsi, and Nizami.

In his autobiographical writings, Shayxzoda described his mother Fatima Khanum as a literate and progressive woman from Qazakh who promoted women's literacy in Aghdash and was known for leading a local women's movement in the 1920s. He referenced his Azerbaijani identity and literary upbringing in his 1957 poem Dashkentname, noting that his passion for poetry began in the land of Nizami.

Shayxzoda expressed his Azerbaijani identity and his childhood in the homeland of Nizami, where his passion for poetry was born, in his 1957 epic poem Dashkentname. He received his early education at the Rushdiyya school in Aghdash. In a 1966 letter to Azerbaijani literary figure Jamil Maharramli, he mentioned his first teacher as Mukhtar Afandizadeh. In 1918, during a visit by Nariman Narimanov to Aghdash, the 10-year-old Maqsud recited a poem at a public event, which led to the publication of three of his poems in the Kommunist newspaper in 1921.

In 1921, he enrolled at the Darulmuallim School in Baku, where he studied under prominent Azerbaijani writers such as Abdulla Shaig and Huseyn Javid. These mentors played a formative role in shaping his views on literature, nationalism, and Turkism. Shayxzoda and his classmate Mikayil Mushfiq were particularly influenced by Tevfik Fikret, Namık Kemal, and other Ottoman poets.

Upon graduating in 1925, Shayxzoda was appointed as a teacher in Derbent, Dagestan—a region with a large Azerbaijani population. There he taught Turkish language and literature while contributing to the Maarif Yolu and Kommunist newspapers. At the time, he used the pen name “Shayxzade,” while the family surname appeared as “Shikhov” or “Shaykhiyev.” In his memoirs, he described this period as one of political and cultural engagement.

In the 1920s, discussions were held in Dagestan regarding the adoption of an official language due to the region’s linguistic diversity (36 languages). Options included Russian, Turkish (mainly Kumyk and Nogai dialects), Arabic, and six local ethnic languages. Turkish was particularly supported. Amid these debates, Shayxzoda began seeking reassignment from Derbent, as the local school no longer matched his academic level. At the end of the 1925–1926 academic year, he applied to the Dagestan Ministry of Education to be transferred to Buynaksk, a request that was approved. He taught at the Buynaksk Pedagogical Institute until June of the 1926–1927 academic year. There, he also established a student theater club, organizing performances attended by soldiers stationed in the local garrison.

It was during this period that Shayxzoda began publishing critical articles and poems in Azerbaijani-language newspapers in Dagestan, such as Maarif Yolu and Dagestan Firqasi. Notable early poems include To the Daughter of the Free Mountains, Sheikh Shamil, This Evening, and On the Shore. While living in Derbent, he often visited Baku and became immersed in its literary circles. During this time, he met contemporary poets like Mayakovsky and Nazım Hikmet, which had a profound influence on his literary development.

In 1927, after returning from Baku with a copy of the Istanbul-based Yeni Kafkasya journal, Shayxzoda was arrested along with fellow teacher Ethem Feyzi for alleged counterrevolutionary activity. A Soviet indictment accused the group of promoting “Musavatist” ideas and opposing Soviet rule, which they reportedly called “Red Imperialism.” Shayxzoda was sentenced to three years of internal exile.

According to literary scholar Naim Karimov, the reasons behind Shayxzoda’s exile also included his dissemination of Yeni Kafkasya, the unpublished libretto Ali-Shir Navai, and his intentions to write works about Amir Timur, Babur, and Fuzuli. Following nine months in Makhachkala, he chose Tashkent as his place of exile and relocated there in February 1928.

=== Life in Tashkent ===
When Maqsud Shayxzoda arrived in Uzbekistan, cultural ties between Tashkent and Baku remained strong. Several Azerbaijani intellectuals lived in Tashkent, including Sabir Sharipov, a friend of Shayxzoda's father. Upon his arrival in 1928, Shayxzoda stayed in Sharipov's home for several months. His choice of Tashkent was welcomed by Soviet authorities, as it distanced him from Musavat supporters and placed him under the close supervision of the Turkestan political administration. Aware of this scrutiny, Shayxzoda was careful to avoid drawing any suspicion during his early years in the city. It was during this time that he began using the surname "Shayxzoda."

Soon after arriving, he began teaching at a newly established Azerbaijani-language school named "Narimanov" near the railway station. He also enrolled in the Philology Faculty of the Central Asian State University, after previously completing his second year in absentia at the Pedagogical Institute in Baku. However, after one year in 1929, he left university to work as a translator for the newspaper Sharq Haqiqati (Truth of the East).

In Tashkent, Shayxzoda became acquainted with young Uzbek poets such as Oybek and Gafur Gulom. With their help, he mastered Uzbek and began composing poetry in the language. In 1929, his first poem in Uzbek, "Tractor," was published in Sharq Haqiqati. He went on to write poetry, epics, plays, translations, and literary criticism in Uzbek for the rest of his life.

Following the closure of Sharq Haqiqati in 1931, Shayxzoda joined the editorial staff of Qizil Uzbekistan, and in 1932 began working for Yosh Leninchi. A year later, he joined the literary journal Gulistan, where he worked until mid-1934.

In 1932, after completing his exile sentence, he briefly returned to Azerbaijan and visited his family. During this visit, he also took final exams at the Pedagogical Institute in Baku, completing his previously interrupted education. He then returned to Tashkent, where he began graduate studies at the Institute of Language and Literature in 1934. At that time, the Institute was led by Atajan Hashim, who was executed during the Stalinist purges in 1938.

After completing his graduate degree, Shayxzoda became a researcher at the Institute and continued his literary activities. He published several poetry collections including Ten Poems (1933), My Depths (1933), Third Book (1934), and Republic (1935), which earned him recognition and membership in the Soviet Writers' Union in 1935.

In 1937, the Uzbek government launched a major translation project to mark the 100th anniversary of Pushkin's death. Shayxzoda was among seven selected writers who worked on Pushkin's translations in a retreat built in the Chimgan Mountains.

During this time, he also prepared a conference on the poetry of Uzbek poet Cholpon. After the arrest of Soviet politician Fayzulla Khojayev in June 1937, mass repressions began in Tashkent. Due to his links with Cholpon, Hashim, and his status as a former exile, Shayxzoda was at risk. He avoided arrest by traveling to Azerbaijan under the pretext of summer leave and returned to Tashkent only in mid-1938. He began teaching Uzbek literary history at Samarkand State University, then moved to the Tashkent Pedagogical Institute in 1939.

During World War II, Shayxzoda wrote the poem "Why Fight?" dedicated to soldiers on the front. He also focused on researching sources for his historical play Jalal ad-Din Manguberdi, based on medieval chronicles. The play premiered in 1944 and was initially successful but was later banned by the Communist Party in 1946 for allegedly glorifying feudal heroes.

From 1945 to 1949, he served as deputy chair of the Uzbek Writers’ Union. In 1951, a commission was formed to investigate his political background and writings. In January 1952, a meeting at the Writers’ Union formally condemned him, leading to his isolation. Accusatory articles appeared in journals, criticizing the ideological content of his work.

On 20 September 1952, Shayxzoda was arrested. During a house search, authorities confiscated photographs, manuscripts, and personal documents. He was accused of participating in nationalist and anti-Soviet activities and promoting feudal nostalgia through his play Jalal ad-Din Manguberdi. In January 1953, he was sentenced to 25 years in a labor camp and deprived of civil rights and property.

Following Stalin’s death in March 1953, many cases were reviewed. In December, Shayxzoda was transferred back to Tashkent, and on 7 June 1954, he was released.

After his release, he appealed for reinstatement and was allowed to teach Uzbek literature and literary theory at the V.G. Belinsky Pedagogical Institute in 1955–56. However, his classes were closely monitored.

Weakened by years of imprisonment, Shayxzoda suffered chronic illness and spent much of 1957 in treatment. He focused on teaching and began preparing a doctoral dissertation on the lyricism of Ali-Shir Nava'i. Due to institutional restrictions in Uzbekistan, he had to submit his thesis to Moscow State University.

In 1957, he completed an epic poem titled Tashkentname with 1,678 lines, published in 1958. In the early 1960s, Shayxzoda reached the peak of his intellectual activity, writing and staging the play Mirza Ulugh Beg (1961), and later adapting it for the film The Star of Ulugh Beg, which won a USSR Film Festival award in 1964.

=== Death ===
He died on 19 February 1967 in a Tashkent hospital. His final years were marked by poor health. Scholar Naim Karimov reported that on the day of his death, his home was ransacked and his unpublished play Biruni went missing. He was buried in the Farabi Cemetery in Tashkent.

== Works ==
Maqsud Shayxzoda began composing poetry at an early age, and according to poet Khalil Rza, he started writing at age 12. His first published poem, "Red Soldier," appeared in the Kommunist newspaper on 12 December 1921 when he was only 13. During his studies at the Baku Teachers' Seminary, he interacted with notable figures such as Mehdi Huseyn, Sabit Rahman, Mikayil Mushfig, and Said Rustamov, all of whom influenced his early literary development. Some of his early Azerbaijani poems were collected in the notebook Shayxzoda's Journal. In 1923, he wrote the play February 28 Revolution, which was staged in Aghdash, featuring a young Said Rustamov.

While working as an educator in Dagestan, Shayxzoda contributed poems and literary essays to Maarif Yolu and Kommunist. His published works included poems like Tale of the East (Şərqin Hekayəti), This Evening (Bu Axşam), Oh Those Days (Hey Gidi Günlər), Daughter of the Free Mountains (Hür Tağlar Kızıge), On the Shore (Sahildə), and Shaykh Shamil (Şeyx Şamil), as well as fragments from the epic Krasin (Krasin) and critical essays in the Literary Conversations (Ədəbi Söhbətlər) series. His Letters from Dagestan (Dağıstandan Məktublar) were featured in Kommunist. According to Khalil Rza, the language of these works often resembled Ottoman Turkish more than Azerbaijani.

Shayxzoda’s early literary work was notably influenced by Turkish literature. His poems such as Azerbaijan (Azərbaycan), Chechens (Çeçenlər), Ingush (İnquşlar), Ossetians (Osetinlər), Kabardians (Kabardinlər), Iranians (İranlılar), and The Independence of Afghanistan (Əfqanıstanın İstiqlalı) explored themes of identity and resistance. His well-known tribute Comrade Kamal, Hero of Turkey (Türkiyə Qəhrəmanı Kamal Yoldaş) and Oother works like Second March (İkinci Marş), Third March (Üçüncü Marş), and Fifth March (Beşinci Marş) also reflect a deep engagement with Turkish literary style. His poem Azerbaijan (Azərbaycan) was a direct response to Namık Kemal’s Homeland Anthem (Vətən Şərqisi), reflecting similar nationalist ideals.

Following his exile to Uzbekistan, Shayxzoda initially refrained from publishing poetry and focused on translation. During this period, many poets turned to translation as a safer alternative to original verse under Soviet scrutiny. He also began researching Uzbek folklore, producing articles on epics such as Alpamysh (Alpamış), Gharib and Shasenem (Qərib və Şahsənəm), and Shirin-Shakar (Şirin-Şəkər). This folkloric influence is evident in poems like Song of Unity (Birlik Təranəsi), The Twin Sons of One Mother – Uzbek and Turkmen (Özbək-Türkmən Bir Ananın Cüt Oğlu), Conversation with the Moon (Ay ilə Söhbət), and Ballad of the Seven (Yeddilik Balladası).

In 1929, his first Uzbek-language poem, Tractor (Traktor), was published in Sharq Haqiqati. From that point onward, he wrote extensively in Uzbek, producing poetry, dramatic works, epics, translations, and literary criticism.

His 1930s poetry combined lyricism, philosophical inquiry, and contemporary themes, as seen in Homeland (Vətən), Humility (Kamtarlıq), Buvijon, Engagement (Nişan), Spring Rain (Baharda Yomg‘ir), I Shared Even My Shadow with the Stars (Yulduzlarga Bo‘ldim Ham Soya), Law (Qonun), Chimyon (Chimyon), Listen, O Heart! (Tingla, Ey Könül!), and The Fall of a Verse (Misranın Tükülüşü). Early works like Symbol (Rəmz) and Winds (Küləklər) were marked by romantic idealism.

In addition to poetry, Shayxzoda wrote plays such as Legacy (Meros), Comrade (Ortoq), Lamp (Chiroq), and Soil and Truth (Tuproq və Haqq). He emerged as a respected critic with articles appearing in Qızıl Özbəkistan, Yaş Leninçi, and Məşalə. His essays addressed the works of authors like Jafar Jabbarly, Huseyn Javid, and Hasan Polad. Between 1938 and 1941, he produced a significant number of scholarly essays on Ali-Shir Nava'i, including The Great Figure of Our Classical Literature (Klassik Ədəbiyyatımızın Ulu Siması), The Problem of Love in the Khamsa (Xəmsədə Məhəbbət Probleması), The Image of Women in Navai (Nəvaidə Ayal Obrazı), and Navai and Babur (Nəvai və Babur).

During World War II, Shayxzoda turned to wartime subjects with collections like Why the Struggle? (Kuraş Neçün), War and Song (Cəng və Mahnı), and The Heart Says... (Qəlb Deyir Ki...). His lyrical epics The Eleven (On Birilər), Zhenya (Jenya), and The Third Son (Üçüncü Oğul) portrayed civilian heroism. He also composed the poem Captain Castello (Kapitan Qastello), inspired by a Soviet airman’s sacrifice. Other poems from this era include Kinship (Qondaşlıq), No, I Am Not Dead (Yox, Mən Ölməmişəm), and Quarter Century (Dörddəbir Əsr). He also wrote the play Elder (Oqsoqol) about Uzbek statesman Yuldash Akhunbabayev.

His verse drama Jalal al-Din Manguberdi (Cəlaləddin Mənquberdi), completed in 1944, depicted 13th-century resistance to Mongol invasion. Though initially successful, the play was later removed from the theater repertoire in 1946 and criticized for idealizing feudal heroes. Khalil Rza Uluturk translated it into Azerbaijani for his anthology Garland of Turan (Turan Çələngi).

In preparation for the 500th anniversary of Navai’s birth, Shayxzoda wrote essays like Navai and Our Time (Nəvai və Bizim Dövrümüz), On Navai’s Lyricism (Nəvai Lirikası Haqqında), and Ali Shir Navai – Devoted to a Free and Mighty Homeland (Əli Şir Nəvai – Azad və Qüdrətli Vətənə Bağlı). He also wrote about literary figures such as Ferdowsi, Nizami, Shota Rustaveli, Shakespeare, Lermontov, Dostoevsky, Mayakovsky, and Muhammad Iqbal.

In the postwar years, Shayxzoda released collections such as The Heart Says... (Ürək Deyir Ki...) (1946), Notebook of Fifteen Years (On Beş İlin Dəftəri) (1947), Poems of the Homeland (Yurd Şeirləri) (1948), Strings of Time (Zamanın Telləri), My Blessings (Alqışlarım) (1949), Ray (Şölə) (1950), My Saz (Mənim Sazım), Notebook of 25 Years (25 İlin Dəftəri), Three Smiles (Üç Təbəssüm), and Years and Roads (İllər və Yollar). He translated Hamlet (Hamlet) and Romeo and Juliet (Romeo və Cülyetta) into Uzbek. Hamlet was published as a book, and Romeo and Juliet was staged in 1951.

His epic poem Tashkentnameh (Daşkəndnamə), composed in 1957 and published in 1958, consisted of 1,678 lines. It was praised for its philosophical reflection, poetic unity, and deep patriotic tone, despite lacking a traditional narrative structure.

His final major play, Mirza Ulugh Beg (Mirzə Uluqbəy), completed in 1960, was based on 17 years of research. The five-act, eight-scene tragedy portrayed Ulugh Beg’s scientific achievements and his tragic conflict with religious and political powers. Ozod Sharafiddinov ranked it among the finest works of global dramatic literature. Shayxzoda noted the influence of Huseyn Javid in shaping the play’s tragic and philosophical depth.

In 1960, Shayxzoda visited India and began working on a play about the medieval scholar Biruni. He collected multilingual sources and folklore, intending to structure the work in five acts. According to Naim Karimov, Shayxzoda continued working on the play even while hospitalized, but the manuscript disappeared at the time of his funeral.

=== Translations and Recognition ===
Shayxzoda translated works by William Shakespeare (Hamlet, Romeo and Juliet), Alexander Pushkin (Mozart and Salieri, The Bronze Horseman), Mikhail Lermontov (The Prisoner of the Caucasus), Vladimir Mayakovsky (Vladimir Ilyich Lenin, October), Lord Byron (Childe Harold’s Pilgrimage), Goethe (Faust), Aesop, Hesiod, Ali-Shir Nava'i, Nizami Ganjavi, Fuzuli, Shota Rustaveli (The Knight in the Panther’s Skin), Taras Shevchenko (The Caucasus, Haidamaky), and many others. He also translated works by modern poets such as Nazim Hikmet (Zoya and 65 poems), Samed Vurgun, and Sergey Yesenin.

== Honors and awards ==
- Honored worker of the Arts of the Uzbek SSR (13 November 1964)
- Order of the Badge of Honour (25 December 1944)
- Order of Outstanding Merit (22 August 2001, posthumously)

== Legacy ==
The documentary Pride of Two Nations was produced in Tashkent by the Heydar Aliyev Azerbaijan Cultural Center in honor of Shayxzoda. In 2018, his 110th anniversary was officially commemorated in Uzbekistan.

== Literature ==
- Kərimov, Naim (2008). XX əsr ədəbiyyatı mənzərələri - 1. kitab [Məsqud Şeyxzadə. Həyatı və İcadi səhifələri]. Daşkənd.
- Ülvi, Almaz (2019). İKİ XALQIN OĞLU MAQSUD ŞEYXZADƏ (in Azerbaijani). Bakı: Elm və Təhsil. ISBN 978-9952-8376-0-5.
- Mirzayev, Saydulla (2005). XX ASR OZBEK ADABIYOTI (in Russian). Daşkənd: Yangi asr avlodi.
- Bargan, Hüseyn (2006). Sibirya ekspresi (in Turkish). İstanbul: Sütun Yayımları.
- Üşenmez, Emek (2011). "Modern Özbek Edebiyatı". Uluslararası Sosyal Araştırmalar Dergisi (in Turkish). 4 (19): 115–169.
- Karakaş, Şuayip (2010). "MAKSUD ŞEYHZÂDE Ve MİRZA ULUĞBEK PİYESİ". Gazi Türkiyat. 0: 13–64.
- Maguire, Muireann; McAteer, Cathy (2024-04-03). Translating Russian Literature in the Global Context (in Arabic). Open Book Publishers. ISBN 978-1-80064-986-6.
- Kahhar, Tahir (2000). "Özbek Edebiyatı II". Başlangıçtam Günümüze kadar Türkiye Dışındaki Türk Edebiyatları Antolojisi (PDF) (in Turkish). Vol. XV. Ankara: Kültür Bakanlığı Yayınları.
