= Academy of Sciences of Uzbekistan =

Coordinates: 41.30673°N 69.286652°E

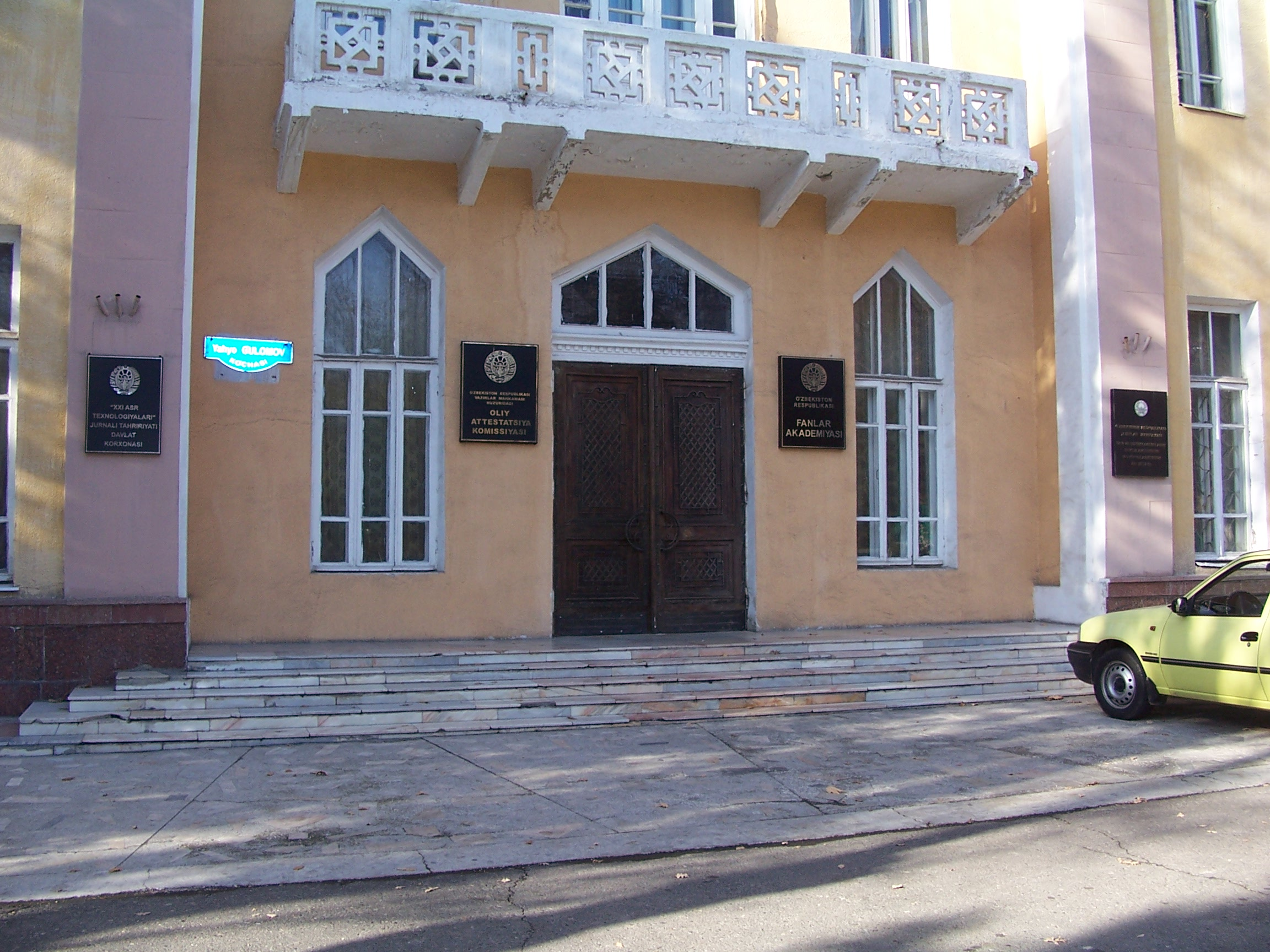
- Entrance to the main building of the Academy of Sciences of Uzbekistan
- Established: 1943
- President: Shavkat Ayupov
- Address: Yahyo Gʻulomov 70, Tashkent
- Location: Uzbekistan
- Website: academy.uz

The Academy of Sciences of Uzbekistan (Uzbek: Oʻzbekiston Respublikasi Fanlar akademiyasi, Ўзбекистон Республикаси Фанлар академияси) is the main scientific organization of the Republic of Uzbekistan. It coordinates research in all areas of science and technology.

The academy was established in 1943 as the Academy of Sciences of the Uzbek SSR. The Academy of Sciences of the Uzbek SSR was acclaimed for its high-quality research, playing an important role in Soviet science. After the collapse of the USSR, it became the Academy of Sciences of Uzbekistan.

== Membership ==
The academy currently has 155 members, 49 academicians, and 106 corresponding members. With more than 50 scientific research institutions and organizations, the academy is the largest scientific organization in Uzbekistan.

== Presidents of the Academy of Sciences of Uzbekistan ==
The Academy of Sciences of Uzbekistan has had thirteen presidents since its foundation.

- Toshmuhammad Qori-Niyoziy (1943–1947)
- Toshmuhammad Aliyevich Sarimsoqov (1947–1952)
- Tesha Zohidovich Zohidov (1952–1956)
- Habib Muhammadovich Abdullayev (1956–1962)
- Ubay Arifovich Orifov (1962–1966)
- Obid Sodyqovich Sodyqov (1966–1984)
- Pulat Qirgizboyevich Habibullayev (1984–1988)
- Mahmud Salohitdinovich Salohitdinov (1988–1994)
- Jura Adbdullayevich Abdullayev (1994–1995)
- Tukhtamurod Jurayevich Jurayev (1995–2000)
- Behzod Sodiqovich Yoʻldoshev (2000–2005)
- Tohir Fotihovich Oripov (2005–2006)
- Shavkat Ismoilovich Salihov (2006–2016)
- Behzod Sodiqovich Yoʻldoshev (2016–2024)
- Shavkat Ayupov (2024 - )

== See also ==
- Fundamental Library of Uzbekistan Academy of Sciences
