= List of Uzbek-language poets =

This is a list of authors who have written poetry in the Uzbek language.

- Abdulla Oripov
- Abdulla Qodiriy
- Choʻlpon
- Erkin Vohidov
- Furqat
- Gʻafur Gʻulom
- Halima Xudoyberdiyeva
- Hamid Olimjon
- Hamza Hakimzade Niyazi
- Ilyas Malayev
- Khosiyat Rustam
- Mashrab
- Mirtemir
- Nodira
- Samig Abdukakhkhar
- Shukrullo
- Zulfiya

== See also ==
- List of Uzbek-language writers
