= Uzbek literature =

Uzbek literature refers to the literature produced and developed in the Republic of Uzbekistan, as well as to literary works contributed by the Afghanistan, Tajikistan, and Kyrgyzstan people of Central Asia. Influenced by Russian and Turkish literature, Uzbek is predominantly written in the Uzbek language with its roots in Chagatai language, one of the widely accessible languages in the region from 14th to 20th century. In Uzbek literature, Chagatai plays an important role as a reference point.

The history of Uzbek literature links ancient and modern Uzbekistan. Before the founding of Uzbekistan, preceding colonies and the Russian conquest of Central Asia had significantly impacted Uzbek literature and continued to mark its presence until the Soviet Union was dissolved in 1991. Central Asian literature, including Uzbek is thus linked to Turkish and Russian literature. However, much of Uzbek literature witnessed significant development in modern era due to its pre-existence in Uzbeks.

Uzbek writing system observed significant changes by its native writers who switched from Turkic script to Arabic that originally began in the 10th century until the 12th century. This development adopted language reforms from Arabic literature. Yūsuf Balasaguni, Mahmud al-Kashgari, and Ahmad Yugnaki were among the leading writers of that time who flourished Uzbek literature by adopting language reforms. Ahmad Yasawi was also one of the other writers who introduced new genre in Uzbek literature. Yesevi's poetry collection Divan-i hikmet (Book of Wisdom) is composed of various dialects, such as Arabic and Persian, which features Turkic metre.

In the later years, Uzbek literature emerged in the Chagatai language between the 13th and 14th centuries. One of poets of that time was Khwārizmī who wrote Muhabbatnamah (Love Letters) that was preserved in the region and serves as a historical reference for modern literature.

== Native Uzbek literature ==
Most Uzbeks belongs to Turkic-speaking groups. Its literature consists of various Turkic group languages such as Kazakh, Turkish, Uyghur, and Tatar languages. In modern day, Uzbek language is recognised as the first language in the Republic of Uzbekistan with 22 million of speakers out of 30 million, while minority communities use Uzbek language as their second language. Thus, modern Uzbek literature is written and orally transmitted in Uzbek language.

=== Development ===
Uzbek literature originated from various Turkic language. These languages are predominantly spoken in Turkmenistan, Tajikistan, Kazakhstan, and Afghanistan in addition to Uzbekistan. The southern parts are influenced by Iran while northern parts are less influenced by Persian. But after the 1917 Russian Revolution, a new literary language was adopted by the natives of northern as well as southern people.

Uzbek literature was originally written in three main scripts: Arabic, Latin, and Cyrillic.However, in the later years, the government of Uzbekistan introduced a modified version of the Latin alphabet in 1933.

== Colonial literature ==
Uzbek language, a primary language used to write Uzbek literature was introduced by the Kara-Khanid Khanate in the 900s. However, after the Mongol invasion of Central Asia, Uzbek became a foremost literary language in the region. Later, when Mughal emperors such as Timur and Babur conquered the region, Uzbek was influenced by Turkish literature as well as culture, and it lost its golden period. When the Soviet Union conquered the region, Uzbek people were declared "Uzbeks" in the Soviet linguistics.

== The rise of poetry ==
In Uzbek literature, Abdulla Qodiriy and Abdul Hamid Suleyman (1897-1939) are recognised two prominent literary figures who shaped Uzbek literature. When Russian revolution took place, the two were charged with "nationalism" and being "enemies of the people" and later they were executed by the Soviet Union. Qodiriy wrote novels, poems and articles for local newspapers focused on political instabilities caused due to the Soviet Union.

During the second half of the 20th century, the number of writers in Soviet Uzbekistan increased significantly. Until the late 1980s, most authors, such as Gafur Gulom, Abdulla Qahhor, Oybek, Abdulla Aripov, Erkin Vahidov, Samig Abdukakhkhar, produced works more in line with then-mandatory Communist Party themes. A new generation of writers, including Razzaq Abdurashid, Abduqahhar Ibrahim, Jamal Kamal, Erkin Wahid, Rauf Parfi, Halima Khudayberdiy, Muhammad Ali, Sharaf Bashbek, and Mamadali Mahmud, emerged with voices less burdened by Soviet "Socialist Realism."
