= List of Uzbek-language writers =

This list includes authors who have written prose in the Uzbek language.

- Abdulla Qahhor
- Abdulla Qodiriy
- Abdulrauf Fitrat
- Gʻafur Gʻulom
- Hamid Ismailov
- Hamza Hakimzade Niyazi
- Jahangir Mamatov
- Samig Abdukakhkhar

== See also ==
- List of Uzbek-language poets
