= Chingiz Akhmarov =

Uzbek muralist, portraitist, miniature painter and teacher

- Чингиз Ахмаров
- Born: 18 August 1912; Troitsk, Russian Empire
- Died: 13 March 1995 (aged 82); Tashkent, Uzbekistan
- Education: Perm School of Fine Arts; Surikov Art Institute
- Occupations: Artist, educator
- Known for: Paintings
- Awards: USSR State Prize; State Hamza Prize

Chingiz Akhmarov (Uzbek: Чингиз Ахмаров; 18 August 1912, Troitsk - 13 March 1995, Tashkent) was an Uzbek muralist, portraitist, miniature painter and teacher. In 1964, he was conferred the title People's Artist of Uzbekistan. He is held in high regard in Uzbekistan and is credited as one of the artists who kept the tradition of Uzbek miniatures alive.

== Early life ==
Akhmarov was born in Troitsk, Russian Empire on 18 August 1912, one of 11 children. His father was a wealthy, educated merchant. The family had a large library, which they had inherited from Akhmarov's grandfather. Akhmarov enrolled in the Perm School of Fine Arts in 1927, the same year his family moved to Qarshi, Uzbekistan for his father's health. In 1930, his family again relocated, this time to Samarkand, and Akhmarov joined them after graduating in 1931.

== Career ==
In Samarkand, Akhmarov taught drawing and painting at a newly opened art school and wrote for magazines including Mushtum and Mashal. In May 1934, he moved to Tashkent, where he worked as an artist in the editorial office of a newspaper. While there, he received assignments to illustrate novels including Holy Blood by Oybek, Childhood by Gairatiy, Mirage by Abdulla Qahhor and Li Chuv by Sh. Sulaimanov. In the 1930s, Akhmarov painted a series of portraits, two of which - Portrait of a Brother and Athletes - were shown at the Museum of Culture and Art of the Peoples of the East in Moscow. He was rejected from the art school in Leningrad in 1935 so went to Moscow instead, where he entered the Surikov Art Institute. He was a student there during the Battle of Moscow but was not able to join the army due to poor hearing. In 1942, the institute temporarily relocated to Samarkand, where Akhmarov graduated, before returning to its original location in Moscow the following year.

In 1943, he was tasked with painting eight frescoes inspired by Alisher Navoi's poems in the newly built Navoi Theater in Tashkent. They were completed in 1947 and the artists who worked on the project, including Akhmarov, received the Stalin prize, 1st class. In 1949, he finished his graduate studies and returned full-time to Tashkent, where he taught at an art school. In 1952, he was summoned back to Moscow to create the Friendship of Peoples mosaic in the Kiyevskaya metro station. He was then asked to fully design the interior of the Opera and Ballet Theatre in Kazan, which he worked on between 1954 and 1955. From there, he worked on a variety of projects, including at the Hotel Ukraina, Ulugh Beg Museum, Institute of Oriental Studies, Navoi Museum, a sanatorium in Sochi and the Tashkent Metro.

After the death of his wife in the early 1960s, Akhmarov returned to Tashkent and moved into a two-bedroom apartment in Chilanzar. He taught at the Tashkent Art Institute and returned to illustrating books. He created watercolour paintings for Maksud Sheikh-Zadeh's book on Ulugh Beg in 1962. The following year, he was invited to create the costumes and other artwork for the film adaption of the book, The Star of Ulugbek. His paintings are held in a number of private and public collections, including at the Museum of Arts of Uzbekistan, Museum of Applied Arts, Navoi State Museum of Literature and Kokand Literature Museum.

== Awards ==
- People's Illustrator of Uzbekistan (13 November 1964)
- Stalin Prize 1st class (1948)
- State Hamza Prize (1968)
- Order of the Red Banner of Labor (16 January 1950)
- Order of Friendship of Peoples (17 August 1982)
- Order of the Badge of Honor (6 December 1951)
- Order of Outstanding Merit (22 August 2001)

== Personal life ==
Akhmarov died on 13 March 1995 in Tashkent. His wife, painter and academic Shamsroy Khasanova, had died c. 1961. His autobiography, On the Path to the Beautiful, was published in 2007.
