= Sharq Yulduzi =

Uzbek magazine

- Frequency: monthly / quarterly
- Founded: 1932
- Country: Uzbekistan
- Based in: Tashkent
- Language: Uzbek

Sharq Yulduzi (Uzbek: Sharq yulduzi, Шарқ юлдузи; literally, "Star of the East") is an Uzbek-language literary, artistic and social magazine. Founded in 1932, its frequency publication has varied from monthly to quarterly. The contents of the magazine mainly focus on Uzbek art and literature, and many prominent Uzbek writers, including Abdulla Qahhor, Maqsud Shayxzoda, Mirmuhsin, Musa Tashmukhamedov, Uyg‘un, Zulfiya, and Gʻafur Gʻulom have contributed to the magazine. Sharq Yulduzi is also known for serializing the first complete Uzbek translation of the Quran by Alouddin Mansur from March 1990 to February 1992, with issue 8/9 in 1992 solely featuring a complete translation of the Quran.

== History ==
The magazine was founded by the Writer's Union of Uzbekistan and originally published under the title Oʻzbekiston Shoʻro Adabiyoti starting in 1932, then became Sovet Adabiyoti in January 1935 before being renamed to Oʻzbekiston Adabiyoti va Sanʼati in July of that year. Publication of the magazine was suspended during World War II, but was resumed in 1946 under the name Sharq Yulduzi.
