= Sami Abduqahhor =

Soviet and Uzbek author and screenwriter

Samig Abdukakhkhar
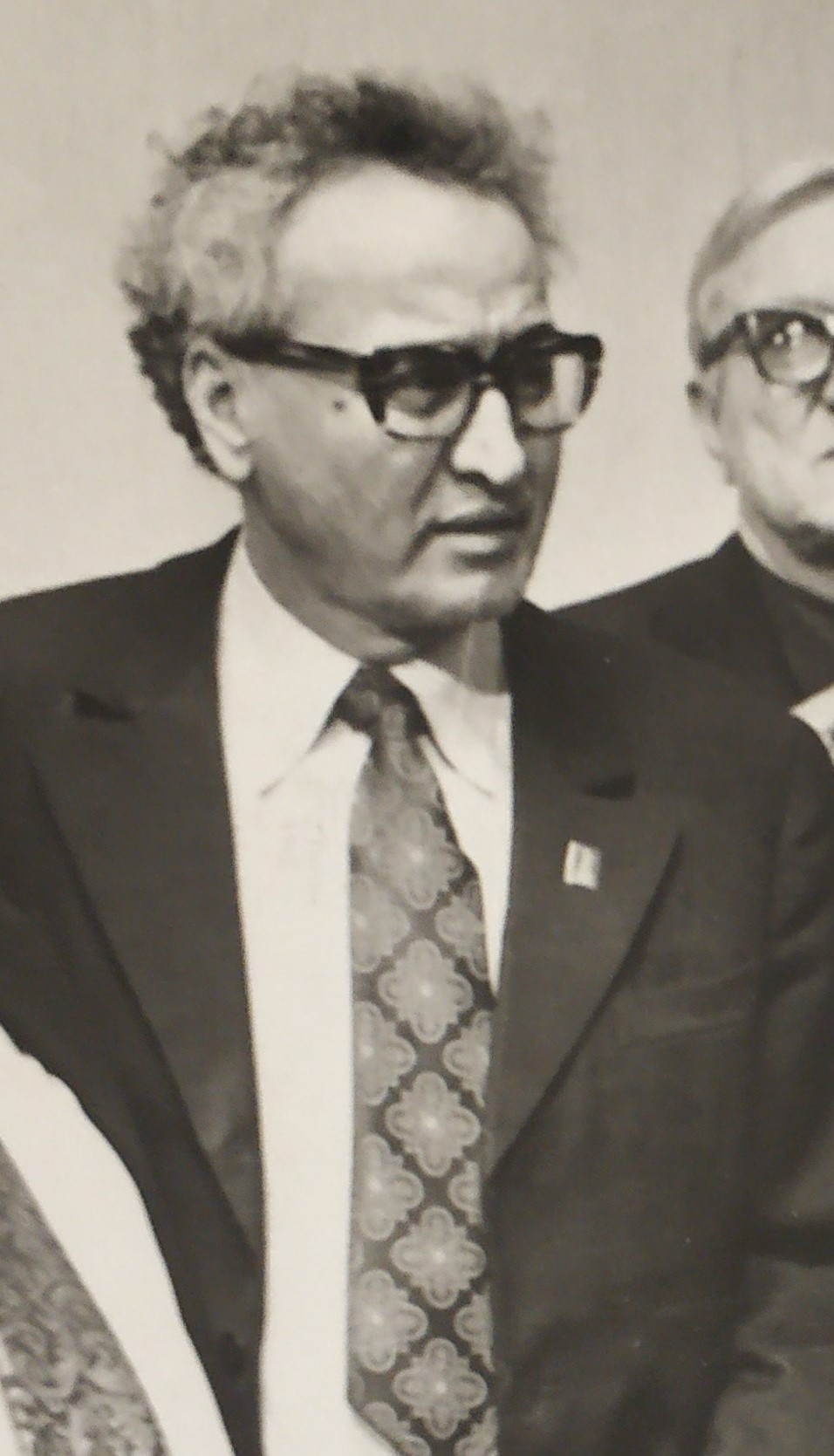
- Samig Abdukakhkhar on the set of the Nashtar, 1960s
- Born: Sami Abduganiyevich Abdukakharov; February 22, 1922; Tashkent, Soviet Union
- Died: February 9, 1990 (aged 68); Tashkent, Soviet Union
- Education: Samarkand State University
- Occupations: Author and screenwriter
- Writing career
- Language: Uzbek
- Years active: 1937–1990
- Genres: Fable, Satire

Sami Abduqahhor (Uzbek Cyrillic: Сами Абдуқаҳҳор; Russian: Cамиг Абдукаххар, romanized Samig Abdukakhkhar; February 22, 1922 – February 9, 1990) was a Soviet and Uzbek author and screenwriter. He is regarded as a central figure in the development of the modern fable genre in 20th-century Uzbek literature. He is known for his humorous short stories, satirical poems, fables, and feuilletons, and was the scriptwriter for several episodes of the television anthology series, Fitil and the feature-length film The Age of Anxiety. From the 1960 to 1980, he was a regular contributor of Krokodil. Together with Anatoly Kabulov, he created the Uzbekistani satirical newsreel "Nashtar."

== Biography ==
Abdukakhkhar was born in Tashkent in 1922. In 1936, he completed then-standard seven years of secondary education and entered the Party Newspaper School at the Central Committee of the Communist Party of Uzbekistan in Tashkent, graduating in 1938.

He began his creative activity in 1937, publishing several satirical stories and essays in republican newspapers and magazines. In 1938, Samig Abdukakhkhar started working at the editorial office of the republican satirical magazine "Mushtum," first as a literary employee and later as the head of the department.

In 1939, he entered the Faculty of Philology at the Alisher Navoi Samarkand State University. He combined his studies with his work as the head of the literature department at the Samarkand regional newspaper "Lenin Yuli" ("Lenin's Path," now "Samarkand Bulletin").

On April 22, 1942, he was drafted into the Soviet Army and served in the border troops until May 1946. He was a participant in the Great Patriotic War.

In the post-war years, he worked as the head of the department at the editorial office of the newspaper "Lenin Uchquni" ("Lenin's Spark," Tashkent), as a correspondent for the Uzbek Telegraph Agency (UzTAG) for the Kashkadarya region, and as the head of the department at the editorial office of the regional newspaper "Kashkadarya Hakikati" ("Kashkadarya Truth," Qarshi).

Since 1948, he was the head of the department at the republican youth newspaper "Yosh Leninchi" ("Young Leninist," Tashkent). From 1951 to 1954, he was a senior editor and then the head of the department at the State Publishing House of the Uzbek SSR (Gosizdat UzSSR). In 1954, he was transferred back to the editorial office of the magazine "Mushtum," and in 1956, he was appointed the executive secretary of the Fergana regional branch of the Union of Writers of the Uzbek SSR (Fergana).

Returning to Tashkent in 1958, he worked as a senior editor at the "Uzbekfilm" studio. From 1960 to 1966, he was the head of the prose department at the magazine "Shark Yulduzi" ("Star of the East," Tashkent).

In 1966, on the initiative of Samig Abdukakhkhar and Anatoly Kabulov, the republican satirical newsreel "Nashtar" was created at the "Uzbekfilm" studio in Tashkent. From the moment of its creation, Samig Abdukakhkhar was the executive secretary of the editorial office—organizing and overseeing the preparation of film stories, as well as working as a screenwriter and director of individual episodes.

Samig Abdukakhkhar was a member of the Union of Soviet Writers, a member of the Union of Cinematographers of the USSR, and an Honored Cultural Worker of the Uzbek SSR.

He died on 9 February 1990, and was buried in Tashkent at the Chigatay Memorial Cemetery.

== Career ==
=== Writer ===
During the lifetime of Samig Abdukakhkhar, a total of 38 books authored by him were published in Uzbek and Russian in Tashkent, Moscow, and Dushanbe, with a combined circulation exceeding 1.1 million copies.

The first book by Samig Abdukakhkhar, a collection of stories titled "Frontline Stories," was published in 1945 in Stalinabad (now Dushanbe, Tajikistan).

Three books by Samig Abdukakhkhar were published by Pravda Publishing House, the largest journal-newspaper publishing house in the USSR: "The Learned Goose and Many Others" (1964), "How I Defended Myself from Criticism..." (1972), "We've Met Somewhere: Feuilletons. Fables. Humoresques" (1984).

Twelve books were published in Russian, including collections of stories, poems, and fables: "Fables" (1958), "The Strong Hand" (1965), "Into the Light of Day" (1972), "Take Care of Men" (1983); the novella "The Path Leads to Happiness" (1963), and children's poems "Valijon the Joker" (1977).

Twenty-three books were published in Uzbek, including collections: "Neighbors" (Qo'shnilar, 1963), "Lighthouses" (Chiroqbonlar, 1964), "My Anger, My Pride" (Qahrim va faxrim, 1972), "Rocks and Shadows" (Qoyalar va soyalar, 1975), the novella "The Beginning of Life" (Hayotning boshlanishi, 1959), children's books "Valijon the Joker" (1968), and "Tashkenbay from Africa" (1989).

Samig Abdukakhkhar's poems, stories, and essays were published in antologies of Soviet writers ("Nestor from Krokodil," "Friendly Laughter," and others), in newspapers and magazines of the USSR (newspaper Pravda, Literaturnaya Gazeta, newspaper Komsomolskaya Pravda, newspaper Sovetskaya Kultura, magazine Druzhba Narodov, magazine Smena, satirical magazine Krokodil, and others), and were broadcast on All-Union Radio.

Samig Abdukakhkhar's works were translated and published in Belarusian, Latvian, Lithuanian, Turkmen, Hungarian, English, and other languages.

=== Screenwriter ===
Samig Abdukakhkhar was the scriptwriter for several episodes of the all-Union satirical newsreel "Fitil" (issues No. 13 (1963) and No. 57 (1967)). In 1966, Samig Abdukakhkhar and Anatoly Kabulov created the republican satirical newsreel "Nashtar" ("Scalpel") at the Uzbekfilm studio, modeled after "Fitil." Like "Fitil," each issue of "Nashtar" consisted of several fictional or documentary film novellas, and sometimes cartoons. The main goal of the creators of the "Nashtar" newsreel was to combat social vices encountered in everyday life through satire and humor. Samig Abdukakhkhar was the author of scripts for more than 50 fictional and documentary episodes of the "Nashtar" newsreel and was also the director of several episodes.

In 1973, the television feature film "The Age of Anxiety," co-written by Samig Abdukakhkhar and Dmitry Bulgakov, was released on the screens of the Soviet Union. The film was produced by the Uzbekfilm studio by order of Central Television of the USSR.

=== Playwright ===
Samig Abdukakhkhar was also the author of several plays for children's theaters ("The Adventures of Samad: A Play for the October Theatre," 1973). His plays "Incident in the Forest" and "Alijan and Valijon" were performed on the stage of the Republican Puppet Theater of Uzbekistan.

=== Translator ===
Samig Abdukakhkhar is also known as a master of literary translation – he was the first to translate into Uzbek a number of works by Russian and Western classics, as well as contemporary writers. Among his translations are the tragedy "The Spaniards" by Mikhail Lermontov (co-translated with Asqad Mukhtar), Herzen's "The Thieving Magpie," Solovyov's "The Tale of Hodja Nasreddin," Anton Chekhov's "Stories and Tales," Hans Christian Andersen's "Fairy Tales," Molière's comedy "Scapin the Schemer," the Finnish satirist Martti Larni's novel "The Fourth Vertebra", Semyon Babayevsky's novel "Cavalier of the Golden Star" (co-translated with A. Rahimi), works by Ivan Krylov, Maxim Gorky, Samuil Marshak, Demyan Bedny, Sergey Mikhalkov, Stepan Oleynik, Rabindranath Tagore, Sabir Tahirzade, novellas by I. Arefyev, Pavel Vezhinov, V. Milchakov, G. Komarovsky, Y. Yanovsky, and other writers and poets. According to journalist Boris Parmuzin, a book of Hans Christian Andersen's works translated into Uzbek by Samig Abdukakhkhar was presented in the permanent exhibition of the Hans Christian Andersen House-Museum in Odense, Denmark.

At the Uzbekfilm studio, Samig Abdukakhkhar participated in dubbing more than 45 feature films into Uzbek. Famous Soviet films "The Cranes Are Flying," "Beware of the Car," "Three Plus Two," "Kochubey," "Stepmother," "The Thorn," "The Clock Stopped at Midnight," "The Unamenables," and "The Little Fugitive" were released in Uzbekistan with Uzbek translations by Samig Abdukakhkhar.

== Scholarly and Literary Peers Recognition ==
Samig Abdukakhkhar is recognized as a key figure in the development of the modern fable genre in 20th-century Uzbek literature. Doctor of Philological Sciences, Professor S. Z. Mirzayev, in his monograph "Uzbek Literature of the 20th Century" (2010), gave the following assessment of his work: "It was precisely in these years [the 1950s] that the folk genres of parables and fables, which had been neglected since Hamza and Elbek, were revived. We should particularly note the successful experiments in this genre system by Samig Abdukakhkhar, Yamin Kurban, Olim Kuchkarbekov... The fables [of Samig Abdukakhkhar] are distinguished by the metaphorical poetic style, apt figurative language. The satirical and humorous poems [of Samig Abdukakhkhar] expanded the genre system of Uzbek poetry."

The famous Soviet writer and author of the anthems of the USSR and Russia, Sergey Mikhalkov, described Samig Abdukakhkhar as "a fighter of a difficult genre." "Samig Abdukakhkhar chose a challenging profession for himself. The writer is faithful to the difficult genre of satire. Why difficult? Because the satirist constantly has to 'spoil relations' with that part of the readership which recognizes itself in his works. An old Uzbek proverb says: 'Before choosing a place for a house, choose a neighbor.' I would choose Samig Abdukakhkhar as my neighbor because we both exhibit intolerance in our creativity... to all who hinder honest people from living and working," wrote Mikhalkov in the foreword to the book "Take Care of Men."

Published by the USSR Academy of Sciences, History of Uzbek Soviet Literature (1967): 'During this period [post-Second-World-War], many fables appeared in republican newspapers and magazines. Among them, the fables of Samig Abdukakhkhar, published as a separate edition, draw attention. [...] Memorable aphorisms, original comparisons, and puns are often found in Samig Abdukakhkhar's fables.

== Honors and awards ==
- Medal "For Distinguished Labor" (March 18, 1959) — for outstanding contributions to the development of Uzbek art and literature and in connection with the Decade of Uzbek Art and Literature in Moscow;
- Honorary title "Honored Cultural Worker of the Uzbek SSR" (1977)

== Legacy ==
- A street in the city of Sherabad, Surkhandarya Region, Uzbekistan, is named in honor of Samig Abdukakhkhar.
- In the main exhibition of the Alisher Navoi State Museum of Literature in Tashkent, there is a display dedicated to Samig Abdukakhar.
- Books by Samig Abdukakhkhar are held in the Russian State Library, the Library of Congress in the USA, the National Library of Australia, the National Library of Belarus, the Alisher Navoi National Library of Uzbekistan, and other libraries around the world.
- Excerpts from Samig Abdukakhkhar's works are used in native language and literature textbooks for general education schools in Uzbekistan and neighboring countries.

== Noteworthy Facts ==
The writer's last novel, "Turquoise Sky," was dedicated to Uzbek soldiers who participated in the Italian Resistance movement during World War II. The prototype for the novel's main character was Sharif Samatov, a native of Samarkand, a scout, and a participant in the partisan struggle in Yugoslavia and Italy. Samig Abdukakhkhar worked on this novel for several years, starting from the late 1970s, and made several trips to Italy to work in the archives, where he gathered material and documentary evidence. The novel was never published because the only copy of the manuscript was lost in the editorial office during the preparation of the novel for publication. An excerpt from the novel was printed in the newspaper "Pravda Vostoka" in 1992 to commemorate his 70th birthday.

== Published Works ==
=== Books ===
==== In Russian ====
- Басни (Basni - Fables) — Tashkent: State Publishing House of the Uzbek SSR, 1958. — [translated from Uzbek] — 10,000 copies.
- Зеленый остров: Очерки (Zelenyy ostrov: Ocherki - Green Island: Essays) — Tashkent: State Publishing House of the Uzbek SSR, 1963. — [translated from Uzbek] — 10,000 copies.
- Тропа ведет к счастью. Повесть (Tropa vedet k schast'yu. Povest' - The Path Leads to Happiness: A Story) — Tashkent: State Publishing House of the Uzbek SSR, 1963. — [authorized translation from Uzbek by A. Bender] — 15,000 copies.
- Ученый гусь и многие другие (Uchenyy gus' i mnogie drugie - The Learned Goose and Many Others) — Moscow: Pravda, 1964. — 250,000 copies.
- Сильная рука (Sil'naya ruka - A Strong Hand) — Tashkent: Tashkent Publishing House, 1965. — [translated from Uzbek] — 15,000 copies.
- Как я защитился от критики... (Kak ya zashchitilsya ot kritiki... - How I Defended Myself from Criticism...) — Moscow: Pravda, 1972. — 75,000 copies.
- Тропа ведет к счастью (Tropa vedet k schast'yu - The Path Leads to Happiness) — Tashkent: Yosh Gvardiya, 1972. — [translated from Uzbek] — 45,000 copies.
- Вечный мир: Басни, фельетоны в стихах, юморески (Vechnyy mir: Basni, fel'etony v stikhakh, yumoreski - Eternal Peace: Fables, Satirical Verses, Humorous Sketches) — Tashkent: Gafur Gulyam Literature and Art Publishing House, 1972. — [translated from Uzbek] — 15,000 copies.
- На свет божий: Басни, фельетоны в стихах, юморески (Na svet bozhiy: Basni, fel'etony v stikhakh, yumoreski - Into the Light of Day: Fables, Satirical Verses, Humorous Sketches) — Tashkent: Gafur Gulyam Literature and Art Publishing House, 1972. — [translated from Uzbek] — 10,000 copies.
- Валиджан-шутник: Веселые рассказы в стихах (Validzhan-shutnik: Veselye rasskazy v stikhakh - Valijan the Joker: Humorous Stories in Verse) — Tashkent: Yosh Gvardiya, 1977. — [translated from Uzbek] — 60,000 copies.
- Берегите мужчин: Басни, фельетоны в стихах, шутки, юмористические рассказы, сатирические киносценарии (Beregate muzhchin: Basni, fel'etony v stikhakh, shutki, yumoristicheskie rasskazy, satiricheskie kinoscenarii - Take Care of Men: Fables, Satirical Verses, Jokes, Humorous Stories, Satirical Screenplays) — Tashkent: Gafur Gulyam Literature and Art Publishing House, 1983. — [translated from Uzbek] — 45,000 copies.
- Мы где-то встречались: Фельетоны, басни, юморески (My gde-to vstrechalis': Fel'etony, basni, yumoreski - We've Met Somewhere: Satirical Essays, Fables, Humorous Sketches) — Moscow: Pravda, 1984. — [translated from Uzbek] — 75,000 copies.

==== In Uzbek ====
- Фронт ҳангомалари (Front hangomalari - Frontline Stories) — Stalinabad: State Publishing House of the Tajik SSR, 1945. — [in Uzbek] — 3,000 copies.
- Китоб қаҳрамони (Kitob qahramoni - Heroes from Kitab: An Essay) — United Publishing House "Kzyl Uzbekistan" and "Pravda Vostoka," 1949. — [in Uzbek] — 10,000 copies.
- Республика юраги (Respublika yuragi - Heart of the Republic: Essays and Stories) — United Publishing House "Kzyl Uzbekistan" and "Pravda Vostoka," 1950. — [in Uzbek] — 10,000 copies.
- Галя Измайлова. Народная артистка УзССР. Очерк (Galya Izmailova. Narodnaya artistka UzSSR. Ocherk - Galya Izmailova. People's Artist of the Uzbek SSR: An Essay) — Tashkent: State Publishing House of the Uzbek SSR, 1953. — [in Uzbek] — 45,000 copies.
- Масаллар (Masallar - Fables) — Tashkent: State Publishing House of the Uzbek SSR, 1954. — [in Uzbek] — 10,000 copies.
- Ҳикоялар (Hikoyalar - Stories) — Tashkent: State Publishing House of the Uzbek SSR, 1956. — [in Uzbek] — 15,000 copies.
- Ҳикоялар. Ўрта ва катта ёшдаги болалар учун (Hikoyalar. Urta va katta yoshdagi bolalar uchun - Stories. For Middle and Older Children) — Tashkent: State Publishing House of the Uzbek SSR, 1956. — [in Uzbek] — 30,000 copies.
- Ҳаётнинг бошланиши (Hayotning boshlanishi - The Beginning of Life: A Story) — Tashkent: State Publishing House of the Uzbek SSR, 1960. — [in Uzbek] — 15,000 copies.
- Олтин водийларни кезганда (Oltin vodiylarni kezganda - When Walking Through the Golden Valley: Essays on the Leaders of the Seven-Year Plan) — Tashkent: State Publishing House of the Uzbek SSR, 1961. — [in Uzbek] — 15,000 copies.
- Бетга айтганнинг заҳри йуқ (Betga aytganning zahri yuq - The Truth Hurts the Eyes: Fables, Parodies, Humor) — Tashkent: State Publishing House of the Uzbek SSR, 1961. — [in Uzbek] — 10,000 copies.
- Санамай саккиз дема (Sanamay sakkiz dema - Don't Say Eight Without Counting... Humorous Stories) — Tashkent: State Publishing House of the Uzbek SSR, 1962. — [in Uzbek] — 15,000 copies.
- Қўшнилар (Qo'shnilar - Neighbors: Stories) — Tashkent: State Publishing House of the Uzbek SSR, 1963. — [in Uzbek] — 15,000 copies.
- Чароғбонлар (Charoqbonlar - Beacons: Essays) — Tashkent: State Publishing House of the Uzbek SSR, 1964. — [in Uzbek] — 15,000 copies.
- Аччиқ дори (Achchiq dori - Bitter Medicine: Satire and Humor) — Tashkent: Tashkent Publishing House, 1965. — [in Uzbek] — 10,000 copies.
- Валижон ҳазилкаш (Valijon hazilkash - Valijan the Joker: Stories in Verse. For Younger Children) — Tashkent: Yosh Gvardiya, 1968. — [in Uzbek] — 60,000 copies.
- Уй остонадан бошланади (Uy ostonadan boshlanadi - The House Begins at the Threshold: Stories) — Tashkent: Gafur Gulyam Literature and Art Publishing House, 1970. — [in Uzbek] — 15,000 copies.
- Фойдали хуррак (Foydali xurrak - A Useful Snore: Satirical Stories) — Tashkent: Publishing House of the Central Committee of the Communist Party of Uzbekistan, 1971. — [in Uzbek] — 50,000 copies.
- Қаҳрим ва фахрим (Qahrim va faxrim - My Anger, My Pride: Poems) — Tashkent: Gafur Gulyam Literature and Art Publishing House, 1972. — [in Uzbek] — 10,000 copies.
- Қоялар ва соялар (Qoyalar va soyalr - Dwarfs and Giants: Stories, Film Stories, Humor [correct translation — Rocks and Shadows]) — Tashkent: Gafur Gulyam Literature and Art Publishing House, 1975. — [in Uzbek] — 60,000 copies.
- Эркакларни асранг (Erkaklarni asrang - Take Care of Men: Satirical Poems, Fables, and Stories) — Tashkent: Publishing House of the Central Committee of the Communist Party of Uzbekistan, 1982. — [in Uzbek] — 33,500 copies.
- Қоялар ва соялар (Qoyalar va soyalr - Rocks and Shadows: Fables, Satirical Verses, Humorous Sketches, Parodies, Satirical Stories) — Tashkent: Gafur Gulyam Literature and Art Publishing House, 1983. — [in Uzbek] — 10,000 copies.
- Ўзларидан сўрасак (Uzlaridan so'rasak - We've Met Somewhere: Stories and a Film Story) — Tashkent: Yosh Gvardiya, 1983. — [in Uzbek] — 30,000 copies.
- Африкалик Тошкентбой (Afrikalik Toshkentboy - Tashkenbay from Africa: A Story and Stories) — Tashkent: Yosh Gvardiya, 1989. — [in Uzbek] — 30,000 copies.

=== In Anthologies ===
- Обыкновенная история. Невыгодная специальность. Сон в руку. и др. (Obyknovennaya istoriya. Nevygodnaya spetsial'nost'. Son v ruku. i dr. - An Ordinary Story. Unprofitable Specialty. Dreams Come True. and others) // Услуга за услугу. Сатира и юмор (Usluga za uslugu. Satira i yumor - Service for Service. Satire and Humor) [Anthology. Illustrated by B.S. Zhukov]. — Tashkent: State Publishing House of the Uzbek SSR, 1962. — 15,000 copies.
- Соседи. Что-то теперь будет?...Сюрприз. Мудрый ответ. Две встречи. и др. (Sosedi. Chto-to teper' budet?...Syurpriz. Mudryy otvet. Dve vstrechi. i dr. - Neighbors. What Will Happen Now?... Surprise. Wise Answer. Two Meetings. and others) // И смех, и слезы. Сатира и юмор (I smekh, i slezy. Satira i yumor - Laughter and Tears. Satire and Humor) [Anthology. Illustrated by B.S. Zhukov]. — Tashkent: "Tashkent", 1966. — 60,000 copies.
- Мунилал: рассказ (Munilal: rasskaz - Munilal: Story) [translated from Uzbek by M. Mirzamukhamedov] // Дятел. Рассказы (Dyatel. Rasskazy - Woodpecker. Stories) — Tashkent: Yosh Gvardiya, 1970. — 90,000 copies.
- Любимый спорт: стихотворение (Lyubimyy sport: stikhotvorenie - Favorite Sport: Poem) // Anthology Нестор из «Крокодила» (Nestor iz "Krokodila" - Nestor from 'Crocodile') — Moscow: Pravda, 1972. — 100,000 copies.
- Муха... в науке: стихи (Mukha... v nauke: stikhi - Fly... in Science: Poems) [translated from Uzbek by A. Naumov] // Anthology Мой узбекский брат «Муштум»: Сатир. рассказы, стихи, карикатуры (Moy uzbekskiy brat "Mushtum": Satir. rasskazy, stikhi, karikatury - My Uzbek Brother 'Mushtum': Satirical Stories, Poems, Cartoons) — Moscow: Pravda, 1973. — 75,000 copies.
- Хобби Рустама: стихи (Khobbi Rustama: stikhi - Rustam's Hobby: Poems) [translated from Uzbek by D. Polinin] // Anthology Дружный смех (Druzhnyy smekh - Friendly Laughter) — Moscow: Art, Issue 4 / Compiled by Ya. I. Ostrovsky. - 1978. — 66,000 copies.
- Небесная загадка: стихи (Nebesnaya zagadka: stikhi - Heavenly Mystery: Poems) [translated from Uzbek by N. Krasilnikov] // Anthology Дружный смех (Druzhnyy smekh - Friendly Laughter) — Moscow: Art, Issue 5 / Compiled by Ya. I. Ostrovsky. - 1979. — 53,450 copies.
- Горько, ох горько... (Gorko, okh gorko... - It's Bitter, Oh So Bitter...) // Белое золото: сборник рассказов узбекских писателей (Beloe zoloto: sbornik rasskazov uzbekskikh pisateley - White Gold: Collection of Stories by Uzbek Writers) [Translated from Uzbek / Compiled by S.M. Madaliev]. — Moscow: Soviet Writer, 1984. — 30,000 copies.
- Ты мне веришь, Салимбай? (Ty mne verish', Salimbay? - Do You Believe Me, Salimbay?) [authorized translation from Uzbek by Boris Privalov] // Тысяча и одна жизнь: Рассказы узб. писателей (Tysyacha i odna zhizn': Rasskazy uzb. pisateley - A Thousand and One Lives: Stories by Uzbek Writers) [Translated from Uzbek / Compiled by N.V. Vladimirova, I.U. Gafurov]. — Tashkent: Literature and Art Publishing House, 1988. — 60,000 copies.

=== Newspapers and Magazines ===
- Literaturnaya Gazeta No. 44: "Ты мне веришь, Салимбай?" (Ty mne verish', Salimbay? - Do You Believe Me, Salimbay?) [authorized translation from Uzbek by Boris Privalov] — Moscow, October 31, 1979.
- Pravda No. 17 (18064): "После переезда в новый кабинет / Защита от критики" (Posle pereezda v novyy kabinet / Zashchita ot kritiki - After Moving to a New Office / Defense Against Criticism) [translated from Uzbek by V. Lipko] — Moscow, January 17, 1968.
- Sovetskaya Kultura No. 36 (270): "Страсть и равнодушие. Очерк" (Strast' i ravnodushie. Ocherk - Passion and Indifference: Essay) — Moscow, March 17, 1955.
- Komsomolskaya Pravda No. 125 (7064): "Где самодеятельность, где художественная самодеятельность?" (Gde samodeyatel'nost', gde khudozhestvennaya samodeyatel'nost'? - Where is the Amateur Art?) — Moscow, May 28, 1948.
- Smena No. 832: "Невыгодная специальность" (Nevygodnaya spetsial'nost' - Unprofitable Specialty) [translated from Uzbek by Oleg Sidelnikov] — Moscow, January 1962.
- Krokodil No. 34 — Moscow, December 1961.
- Krokodil No. 02 — Moscow, January 1970.
- Krokodil No. 32 — Moscow, November 1970.
- Krokodil No. 06 — Moscow, February 1972.
- Krokodil No. 15 — Moscow, May 1972.
- Krokodil No. 19 — Moscow, July 1975.
- Zvezda Vostoka No. 7-10: "Ҳаётнинг бошланиши. Повесть" (Hayotning boshlanishi. Povest' - The Beginning of Life: A Story) [translated from Uzbek by A. Bender] — Tashkent, July-October 1962.
- Zvezda Vostoka No. 4: "Африка ҳикоялари" (Afrika hikoyalari - African Stories) [translated from Uzbek by Yu. Kovalev] — Tashkent, April 1972.

=== Vinyl Records ===
- Samig Abdukakhar. Fables. In Uzbek. Read by the author [Audio Recording]: D 29449-50 - Tashkent: Tashkent Recording Studio, 1970.
- Only You (Сенсан Энг Керагим) [Audio Recording]: Uzbek Folk Song / Lyrics by Samig Abdukakhar // Rahimov, Kamaliddin. Nightingale [Audio Recording]: Sung by Kamaliddin Rahimov / [accompanied by] National Instrument Ensemble under the direction of M. Mukhammadov. - Moscow: Melodiya, 1983 (Tashkent: Tashkent Recording Studio, 1982).

== Links ==
- The collection of books by Samig Abdukakhar in electronic format (scans)

== See also ==
- Gʻafur Gʻulom (1903 – 1966), Uzbek poet, writer, and translator.
- Abdulla Qahhor (1907 – 1968), Uzbek novelist, short story writer, playwright.
- Zulfiya (1915 – 1996), Uzbek poet and literary figure.
- Oybek (1905 – 1968), Uzbek writer, poet, and literary translator.
- Uyg‘un (1905 – 1990), Uzbek poet, dramatist, and politician.
