= Sherali Joʻrayev =

Uzbek singer and songwriter (1947–2023)

Sherali Joʻrayev Sherali Joʻrayev / Шерали Жўраев
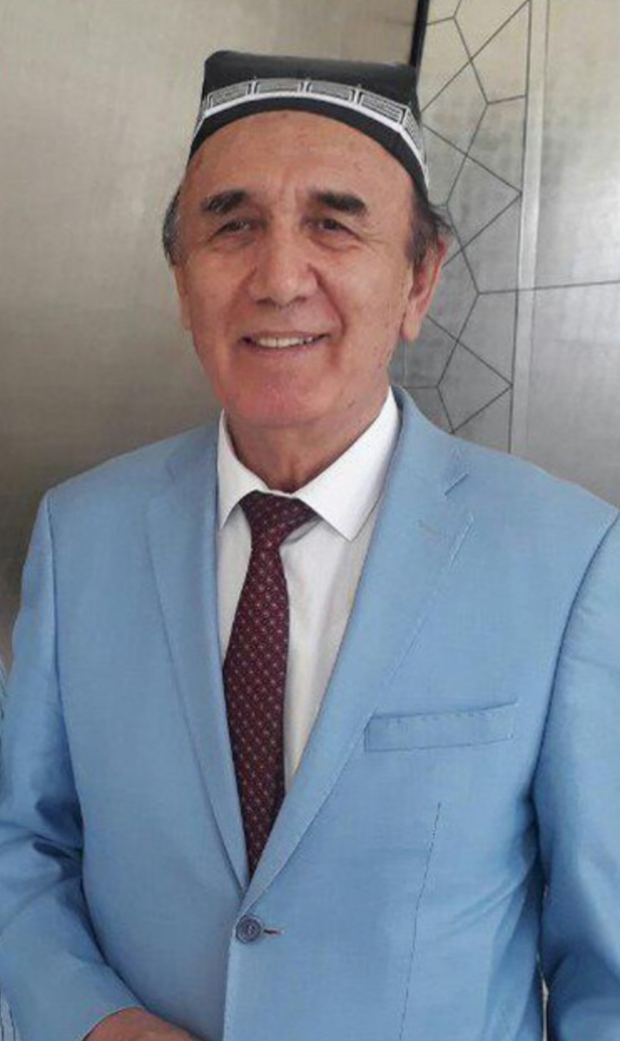

Background information
- Born: Shermat Joʻrayev; 12 April 1947; Asaka, Andijan Region, Uzbek SSR, USSR
- Died: 4 September 2023 (aged 76) Tashkent, Uzbekistan
- Genre: Traditional music
- Occupations: singer, songwriter, poet, author, and actor
- Years active: 1972–2023
- Awards: People's Artist of the Uzbek SSR (1987); Alisher Navoiy State Prize (1991); Fidokorona xizmatlari uchun (2018); People's Artist of Tajikistan (2018); El-Yurt Hurmati (2022)

Sherali Joʻrayev (Uzbek: Sherali Joʻrayev / Шерали Жўраев, Russian: Шерали Джураев; c. 12 April 1947 – 4 September 2023) was an Uzbek singer, songwriter, poet, author, and actor. He was an influential figure in Uzbek cultural life for nearly five decades. Much of his most celebrated work dates from the 1980s and 1990s.

His most famous songs include "Birinchi muhabbatim", "Inson qasidasi", "Karvon", "Oshiqlar sardori", and "Oʻzbegim", which are regularly played at public events and weddings in Uzbekistan and neighboring Central Asian countries. Joʻrayev's lyrics incorporated a variety of political, social, philosophical, and literary influences. Some of his lyrics have become part of everyday Uzbek vocabulary. While Joʻrayev usually wrote both the music and lyrics to his songs, he also used lines from the poems of Ali-Shir Nava'i, Babur, Jami, Rumi, Abdulla Oripov, and Erkin Vohidov in his songs.

Joʻrayev wrote the screenplay and played the leading role in the 1989 film Sherali va Oybarchin. He also penned two books, Bola dunyoni tebratar (1988) and Bir qoʻshiq kuylayki... (2023). He was a member of the Supreme Assembly of Uzbekistan from 1990 to 1995.

Joʻrayev was awarded dozens of awards and nominations, including the title People's Artist of the Uzbek SSR in 1987. In 1991, he received the Alisher Navoiy State Prize. He was also awarded the orders of Fidokorona xizmatlari uchun (2018) and El-Yurt Hurmati (2022). In 2018, he became a People's Artist of neighboring Tajikistan, an extremely rare feat for a performer who is not a citizen of Tajikistan.

Starting from 2002, Uzbek government authorities banned Joʻrayev's appearance on Uzbek television and radio. He fell out of favor with the government for his critical remarks about the difficult economic situation in the country. Following the death of President Islam Karimov in 2017, the unofficial ban on Joʻrayev was lifted and in subsequent years he was regularly featured on state television.

== Early life and education ==
Sherali Joʻrayev was born in 1947 in Asaka, then the Uzbek SSR, USSR. His birth name was Shermat Joʻrayev but at some point in the late 1980s he officially changed his first name to Sherali. The exact date of his birth is unknown. The singer symbolically chose April 12 as his birthday because on that day he entered the Kaaba, a rare honor granted to only a few in the Soviet period. This took place in the 1990s during a visit to Mecca as part of a delegation from Uzbekistan alongside the First President, Islam Karimov. Joʻrayev graduated from the Uzbekistan State Institute of Arts and Culture in 1976.

From 1972 until 1979, Joʻrayev worked at the Shodlik Song and Dance Ensemble. From 1979 to 1986, he worked at the Andijan Province Philharmonic. From 1986 to 1996, he worked at the Uzbek State Philharmonic.

== Music career ==
Throughout his long career, Joʻrayev wrote and recorded close to 600 songs. Joʻrayev was interested in and influenced by classic Turkic and Persian poetry. In 2008, he organized gatherings at his home to celebrate the works of Rumi.

His most famous songs include "Bahor ayyomi" (lyrics taken from a Babur poem), "Birinchi muhabbatim" (lyrics taken from an Abdulla Oripov poem), "Inson qasidasi" (lyrics taken from an Erkin Vohidov poem), "Karvon" (lyrics taken from an Usmon Azim poem), "Meni kutgil" (lyrics taken from a Konstantin Simonov poem), "Oshiqlar sardori" (lyrics taken from a Rasul Gamzatov poem), "Oʻzbegim" (lyrics taken from an Erkin Vohidov poem), "Oʻxshamas" (lyrics taken from an Ali-Shir Nava'i poem), and many others.

"Karvon"
Sample of "Karvon" ("Caravan"). "Karvon", recorded in 1985, is one of Joʻrayev's most celebrated songs.

Joʻrayev's was frequently invited to important state celebrations and other countries to perform, including Kyrgyzstan, Tajikistan, and Russia. In honour of Queen Elizabeth II's 78th birthday, British Ambassador Craig Murray welcomed more than a thousand guests to his residence in Tashkent on 23 April 2004. The celebrations featured Joʻrayev, Sevara Nazarkhan, and a Chamber Orchestra. At the same time, the British Embassy arranged a tour of Uzbekistan by Scotland's Battlefield Band, with whom Joʻrayev performed at the residency before a large and influential audience.

Joʻrayev's song Oʻzbegim was featured on the 2005 album Rough Guide to the Music of Central Asia which was released by World Music Network.

== Other works ==
Joʻrayev was a member of the Supreme Assembly of Uzbekistan from 1990 to 1995. In 1988, Joʻrayev wrote a book entitled Bola dunyoni tebratar. In 2023, a few months before his death, he published his second book entitled Bir qoʻshiq kuylayki.... Joʻrayev also wrote the screenplay and played the leading role in the 1989 film Sherali va Oybarchin.

== Censorship ==
In 2002 Uzbek government authorities banned Joʻrayev's appearance on Uzbek television and radio stations because of his "alleged political unreliability". He fell out of favour with the Uzbek government for his critical remarks about the difficult economic situation in the country. The singer generally avoided talking about the ban in public.

In 2017, one year after the death of Islam Karimov, Joʻrayev was briefly shown on state television. In subsequent years until his death in 2023 he was regularly featured on state television.

== Personal life ==
Joʻrayev kept his private life away from the public. According to some sources, he was married three times. These sources claim that the singer did not have any children with his first wife and therefore divorced her.

Joʻrayev was also reported to have been briefly married to the dancer Zulxumor Qodirova, who later became a Meritorious Artist of Uzbekistan. The relationship received much media scrutiny, especially after Qodirova's son Botir Qodirov, also a singer, claimed Joʻrayev was his father. Joʻrayev vehemently denied having fathered Qodirov and publicly accused him of slander. In 2024, a district court ruled that Qodirov is, in fact, Joʻrayev's biological son, and ordered that his birth certificate be reissued to reflect this.

In public Joʻrayev claimed that he was married only once and that he had five children, two sons and three daughters. Two of his sons, Shohjahon Joʻrayev and Zohir Shoh Joʻrayev, are popular singers in Uzbekistan.

Joʻrayev died on 4 September 2023, at the age of 76. There had been speculation about his ill health since 2021. President Shavkat Mirziyoyev expressed condolences over the death of the singer.

== Accolades ==
Throughout his career Joʻrayev received dozens of awards and nominations, including the title People's Artist of the Uzbek SSR (1987). In 1991, he received the Alisher Navoiy State Prize. He was also awarded the orders of Fidokorona xizmatlari uchun (2018) and El-Yurt Hurmati (2022). In 2018, he became a People's Artist of neighboring Tajikistan.

== Discography ==
- Yor-yor (1980)
- Oq qayin (1982)
- Karvon (1986)
- Kuy sehri (1987)
