= Mushtum =

- Editor: Nosirjon Toshmatov
- Categories: Humor magazine
- Circulation: 22,000
- Publisher: Sharq Publishing House
- Founder: Abdulla Qodiriy
- Founded: 1923
- First issue: 18 February 1923
- Company: Sharq
- Country: Uzbekistan
- Based in: Tashkent
- Website: Website

Mushtum (fist in Uzbek) is an Uzbek satire and humor magazine published since 1923. It was founded by Abdulla Qodiriy. In 1927, the magazine began to cooperate with the Krokodil, a similar Russian magazine. Mushtum has been a starting point and an aegis of many Uzbek authors, including Abdulla Qahhor, Erkin Vohidov, Gʻafur Gʻulom, Said Ahmad, Samig Abdukakhkhar, Asqad Muxtor and Mirmuhsin.

During the Soviet era, Mushtum was published by printing house of the Central Committee. Since the Soviet dissolution, the magazine has been published by Sharq Publishing House.
