= Happy Wedding =

Happy Wedding may refer to:

- Happy Wedding (2016 film), an Indian Malayalam-language romantic comedy film
- Happy Wedding (2018 film), an Indian Telugu-language romantic drama film
- Shaadi Mubarak, an Indian drama television series
- Shaadi Mubarak (film), a 2021 Indian Telugu-language film

== See also ==
- Toʻylar muborak or Happy Wedding Day!, a 1978 Uzbek comedy film
