= Utkir =

Utkir or Oʻtkir is an Uzbek masculine given name. Notable people with the name include:

== Utkir ==
- Utkir Kurbanov (born 1983), Uzbek judoka
- Utkir Tukhtamurodovich Sultonov (1940–2015), Prime Minister of Uzbekistan
- Utkir Yusupov (born 1991), Uzbek footballer

== O‘tkir ==
- Oʻtkir Hoshimov (1941–2013), Uzbek writer
