= Halima Xudoyberdiyeva =

- Born: 17 May 1947; Sirdaryo Region, Uzbek SSR, Soviet Union
- Died: 17 August 2018 (aged 71); Tashkent, Uzbekistan
- Education: Tashkent State University Maxim Gorky Literature Institute
- Occupations: poet, editor
- Writing career
- Language: Uzbek
- Notable awards: Oʻzbekiston Xalq Shoiri (People's Poet of Uzbekistan); Hurmat Belgisi medal Order of El-Yurt Hurmati (Respect of the Homeland) medal

Halima Xudoyberdiyeva (Cyrillic: Ҳалима Худойбердиева; pronounced [halima χudɒjberd̪iˈjeβa]; 17 May 1947 – 17 August 2018) was an Uzbek poet whose themes at different times of her career have dealt with Uzbek nationhood and history, liberation movements, and feminism. She was awarded the title People's Poet of Uzbekistan.

== Life ==
Halima Xudoyberdiyeva was born on 17 May 1947 on Taraqqiyot Collective Farm in Boyovut, Sirdaryo, Uzbekistan. In 1972 she graduated from Tashkent State University's Faculty of Journalism. Her first employment was as an editor at Saodat magazine. In 1975–1977 she did advanced graduate study at the Maxim Gorky Literature Institute in Moscow. She went on to become the head of the Yosh Gvardiya department of publications in 1978. From 1984-94 she was the editor-in-chief of Saodat. She served as the first president of the Women's Committee of Uzbekistan from 1991-94.

== Critical reception ==
In 1992 Xudoyberdiyeva was honored with the title People's Poet of Uzbekistan and the Order of the Badge of Honor medal. In 2017, on her 70th birthday, she was awarded the Order of El-Yurt Hurmati (Respect of the Homeland) medal. According to Razia Sultanova, Xudoyberdiyeva's poetry presents "perfect examples" of Central Asian female Sufi poetry.

== Works ==
- Ilk Muhabbat (First Love), 1972
- Oq Olmalar (White Apples), 1973
- Chaman (Flower Garden), 1974
- Suyanch Togʻlarim (My Supporting Mountains), 1976
- Beliye Yabloki (Russian translation of Oq Olmalar), 1977
- Bobo Quyosh (Grandfather Sun), 1977
- Muqaddas Ayol (Sacred Woman), 1987
- Bu Kunlarga Yetganlar Bor (Those Who Have Reached These Days), 1993
- Toʻmarisning Aytgani (The Sayings of Tomyris), 1996

Xudoyberdiyeva's anthology Saylanma (Selection), with a foreword by poet Abdulla Oripov, was published in 2000.

== Awards ==
- Order of the Badge of Honour (16 November 1984)
- State Hamza Prize (1990)
- People's Poet of Uzbekistan (24 May 1992);
- Order "El-yurt hurmati"
