= People's Poet of Uzbekistan =

People's Poet of Uzbekistan (Uzbek: Oʻzbekiston xalq shoiri) is an order of the Republic of Uzbekistan. It was known as People's Poet of the Uzbek SSR during the Soviet period.

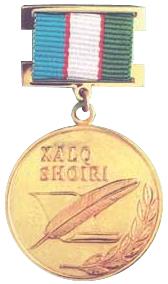
Oʻzbekiston Xalq Shoiri medal

== 1963 ==
- Gʻafur Gʻulom—poet, author, publisher, and translator.

== 1965 ==
- Zulfiya Isroilova—poet, translator, and public figure.

== 1981 ==
- Shukrullo Yusupov—poet, author, publicist, playwright, and translator.

== 1987 ==
- Erkin Vohidov—poet and playwright, and literary translator.

== 1989 ==
- Abdulla Oripov—poet and playwright, and literary translator.

== 1992 ==
- Halima Xudoyberdiyeva—poet and editor.
- Oydin Hojieva—poet.

== 1998 ==
- Anvar Obidjon—poet.

== 1999 ==
- Xurshid Davron—poet, journalist, historian, author, and translator.

== 2000 ==
- Usmon Azim—poet, playwright, screenplay writer, and writer of prose.
