= Oʻtkir Hoshimov =

Uzbek writer (1941–2013)

Oʻtkir Hoshimov Ўткир Ҳошимов
- Born: 5 August 1941; Tashkent, Uzbek SSR, Soviet Union
- Died: 24 May 2013 (aged 71); Tashkent, Uzbekistan
- Occupations: Writer, playwright, journalist, and literary translator
- Writing career
- Notable awards: State Hamza Prize (1986); People's Writer of Uzbekistan (1991); Order of Outstanding Merit (2001)
- Literary movement: Socialist realism and realism

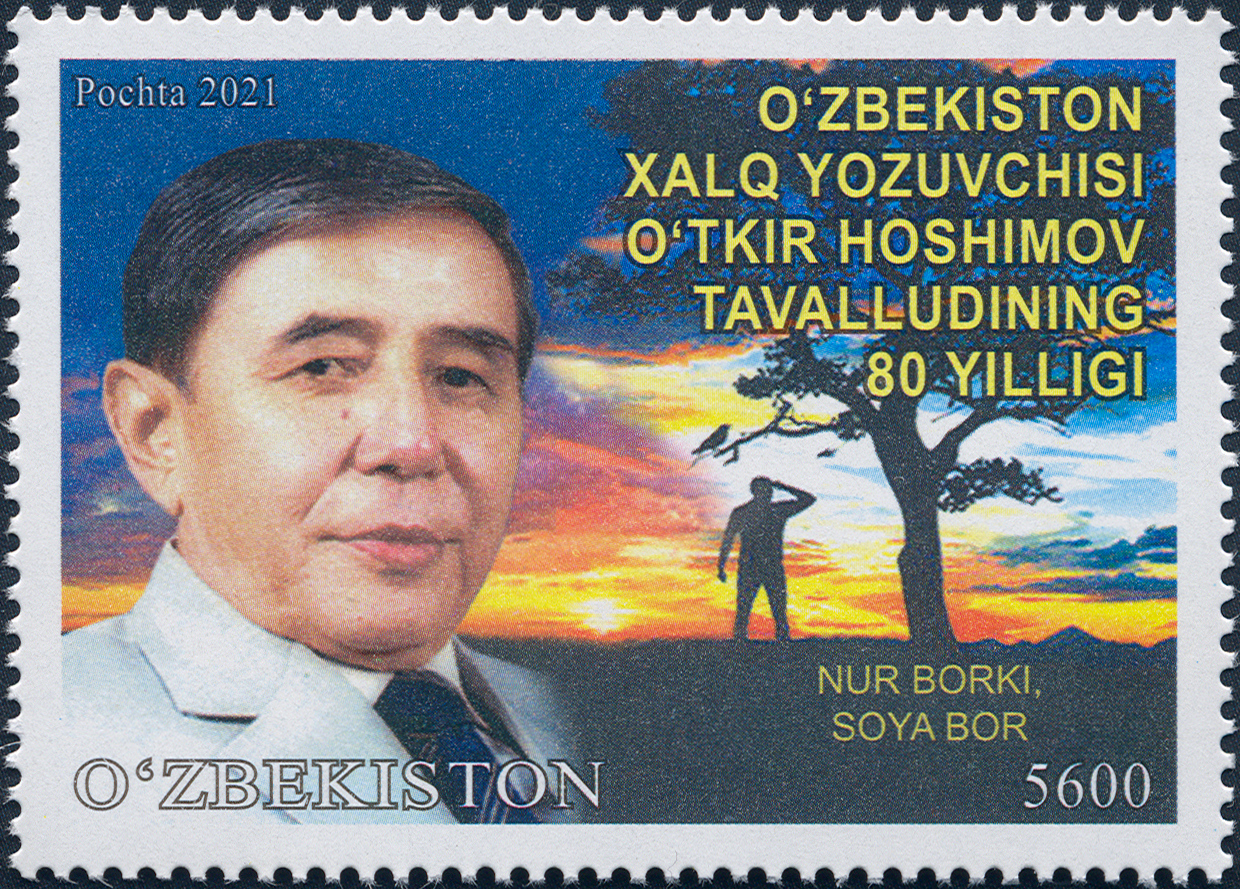
Oʻtkir Hoshimov on a 2021 stamp of Uzbekistan

Oʻtkir Hoshimov (Note: Uzbek: Oʻtkir Hoshimov, Ўткир Ҳошимов; Russian: Уткир Хашимов, romanized: Utkir Khashimov.) (5 August 1941 — 24 May 2013) was an Uzbek writer, playwright, journalist, and literary translator. His most popular work is his 1985 novel Ikki eshik orasi, for which he received the State Hamza Prize. In 1991, he became a People's Writer of the Uzbek SSR.

During his long career he wrote many popular short stories. He also wrote several plays, including Toʻylar muborak, which was adapted into film in 1978. Hoshimov also translated the works of foreign authors, including Ernest Hemingway and Konstantin Simonov, into Uzbek.

== Biography ==
Oʻtkir Hoshimov was born in Tashkent on 5 August 1941. He began working at the railway newspaper Temiryoʻlchi in 1959. His collection of essays called Po‘lat chavandozlar was published in 1962, followed by the story "Cho‘l havosi" a year later.

After graduating from the Journalism Faculty of Tashkent State University in 1964, Hoshimov continued his journalism career. In 1986, he was awarded the State Hamza Prize for his novel Ikki eshik orasi. In 1993, another of his popular novels, Tushda kechgan umrlar, was serialized in the Sharq Yulduzi magazine. He considered Abdulla Qahhor to be a big influence on him as writer.

In 1995, he became the chairman of the Press and Information Committee of the Oliy Majlis of Uzbekistan. At the height of his career, he was the editor-in-chief of the Gʻafur Gʻulom Publishing House.

He died in Tashkent on 24 May 2013.
