= Alisher Navoiy State Prize =

- Uzbek: Alisher Navoiy nomidagi Davlat mukofoti / Алишер Навоий номидаги Давлат мукофоти
- Awarded for: outstanding achievement in literature, arts, and architecture
- Date: 1989–2006
- Country: Uzbek SSR and later Uzbekistan
- Eligibility: Citizens and non-citizens
- Related: State Hamza Prize

The Alisher Navoiy State Prize (Uzbek: Alisher Navoiy nomidagi Davlat mukofoti, Алишер Навоий номидаги Давлат мукофоти) was an award given in the Uzbek SSR and later Uzbekistan to recognise outstanding achievement in literature, the arts, and architecture. The award, named after the Turkic poet and statesman Ali-Shir Nava'i, was established on 19 September 1989. From 1989 until its disestablishment in 2006, it was awarded every three years on 1 September, Independence Day of Uzbekistan. Each recipient (known as a 'laureate') received a monetary award equal to 200 times the minimum monthly wage in Uzbekistan at the time. Notable recipients include Abdulla Oripov and Sherali Joʻrayev.

== See also ==
- State Hamza Prize
