= Oʻtkan kunlar =

1925 Uzbek-language novel by Abdulla Qodiriy

Bygone Days
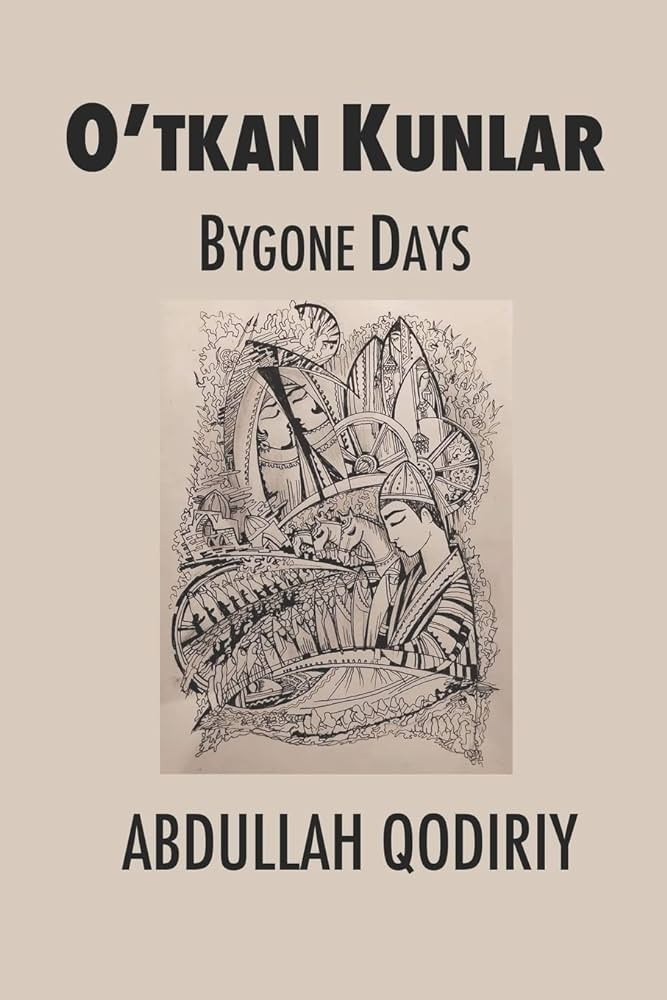
- Author: Abdulla Qodiriy
- Original title: Oʻtkan kunlar
- Translator: Mark Edward Reese
- Language: Uzbek
- Publisher: Bowker (the English publisher)
- Publication date: 1922–1925 (in the magazine Inqilob); 1926 (as a book) <be> November 17, 2019 (in English)
- Publication place: U.S.S.R.
- Pages: 508

Bygone Days (Uzbek: Oʻtkan kunlar) is a 1925 Uzbek-language novel by Abdulla Qodiriy which is considered to be the first Uzbek novel. The novel was serialized in the magazine Inqilob from 1922–1925. A film of the same name was released by Uzbekfilm in 1969. The writer was inspired by the novels of the Lebanese writer Jurji Zaydan.

An English translation by Mark Reese with the title "Bygone Days" was published in 2018.

== Plot ==
The novel covered the events of 19th century. The events were presented by the love story of Otabek and Kumush, the leading characters. The course of events takes place in an environment of bloody struggles of local rulers for power. In Days Gone By, as in other major epics, we encounter the multiplicity of storytelling, the presence of secondary subjects, and a series of escalating and tragic events.

The image of Otabek, who promotes progressive ideas, is the ideological and compositional center of the novel. He openly opposed the outdated economic relations in trade and pursued a new approach to family and marital problems. There is a conflict between Otabek and the forces that cling to the old, delay the development of the country. Abdulla Qodiriy speaks on behalf of his protagonist.

At the same time, the writer follows the fate of an Uzbek woman. Cruel traditions, including polygamy, lead to a deadly feud between Kumush and Zaynab.

With extraordinary love and sincerity, the writer creates the image of Kumush, who overcomes the trials of life with a pure, all-encompassing love for Otabek. But tragedy is inevitable. She was poisoned by concubine, and Otabek died defending his homeland
