= Toʻylar muborak =

1978 Uzbek comedy film

Toʻylar muborak/Тўйлар муборак
- A screenshot from the movie
- Directed by: Eduard Khachaturov
- Written by: Oʻtkir Hoshimov; Boris Saakov
- Starring: Obid Yunusov
- Edited by: F. Musajonov
- Music by: Y. Shiryayev
- Production company: Uzbekfilm
- Release date: 1978
- Running time: 65 minutes
- Countries: Uzbek SSR, USSR
- Languages: Uzbek, Russian

Toʻylar muborak (Happy Wedding Day!) (Uzbek: Тўйлар муборак, romanized: Toʻylar muborak; Russian: Подарю тебе город) is a 1978 Soviet-era Uzbek romantic musical comedy film directed by Eduard Khachaturov. The film stars Obid Yunusov, a People's Artist of Uzbekistan and tells the story of a bridegroom who ends up helping many people in trouble on his wedding day and as a result barely makes it to his own wedding.

== Plot ==
After traffic police stop Yunus and his friends who are slightly drunk, he takes a taxi and leaves his friends behind. The taxi driver gets dizzy and crashes the car. Yunus, despite being in a hurry to attend his own wedding, takes the taxi driver to hospital. When he gets out of the hospital, a couple begs him to take them in "his taxi" to some place. Everyone thinks Yunus is a taxi driver and he finds it increasingly difficult to refuse to take people to places.

Towards the end of the film, Yunus meets an older woman arguing with a construction worker who is asking for an exorbitant amount of money to cover her wall with plaster of Paris. Yunus decides to do the job instead of the worker. After mixing water with plaster of Paris, he sits to have a rest and starts to daydream. The mixture quickly hardens and he gets stuck in it. Ultimately, a forklift truck takes Yunus with his feet stuck in the tray to the wedding place.
