= Khosiyat Rustam =

Poet, translator, and screenwriter

- Xosiyat Rustamova
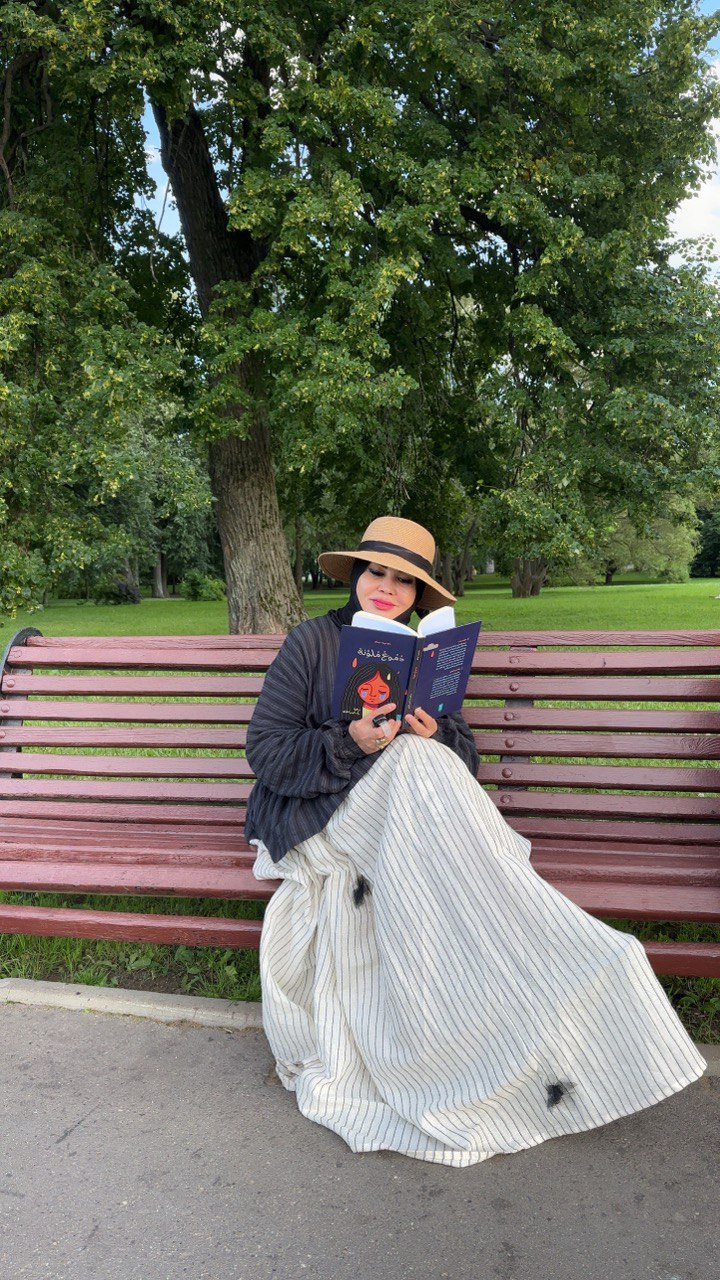
- Born: March 19, 1971 (age 55); Olmos village, Chust district, Namangan region
- Spouse: Qoʻchqor Norqobil
- Writing career
- Language: Uzbek language
- Period: from 1997 to present
- Notable awards: "Shuhrat" (Fame) order; Mikail Mushfiq Award of Azerbaijan; "Golden Knight" award of the Russian and others

Signature
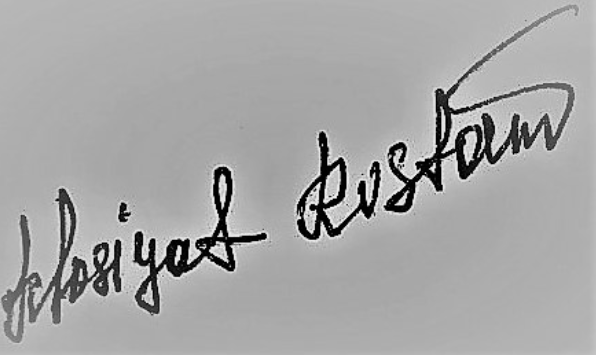

Khosiyat Rustamova (Uzbek: Xosiyat Rustamova) is an Uzbek poet, translator, author of several scenarios.

== Early life and education ==
Khosiat Rustam was born in 1971 in Olmos village, Chust district, Namangan region. In 1993, she graduated from the Faculty of Journalism of Tashkent State University.

In 2021, she graduated from the International Writers Program at the University of Iowa in the United States.

== Career ==
Currently, she is the editor-in-chief of the newspaper "Kitob dunyosi" (The Book World) and an independent researcher of Alisher Navoi University of Language and Literature. From 2022, she is the coordinator of The World Poet Movement of Colombia in Uzbekistan.

=== Diplomatic activities ===
In 2015, Rustam wrote the screenplay for the film "Ajal jodusi" together with Hilal Nasimov.

In 2020, on the initiative of Rustam, many famous poets and writers of the world wrote a letter of sympathy to the President of Azerbaijan, Ilhom Aliyev. And this letter was read out on many sites and Azerbaijan TV. In addition, her books "Ismi Lola edi u qizning" (That girl's name was Lola) and "44 days" dedicated to the conflicts between Azerbaijan and Armenia were published in Azerbaijan in the Azerbaijani-Turkish-Uzbek languages. In addition, her other books were translated into Azar by Ramiz Askar, a literary scholar, professor, laureate of the international Babur Prize, published in Azar and Uzbek for university students and included in the curriculum. Khosiat Rustam's poetry has been translated into more than 30 languages and her books have been published in several foreign countries.

The book "Khosiyat" in Uzbek, prepared on the basis of articles and essays written by world-famous poets, writers and literary experts, and the English version of "Khosiyat" are being prepared for publication in London "EGG London" publishing house.

The filming of the two-part film, which is being made in cooperation with Azerbaijan TV and Uzbekistan TV, is still going on. In 2024, once Khosiyat Rustam appealed to all poets and writers on earth by her article named "Earth is the homeland of all humanity", this article translated into more than 18 languages.

== Awards ==
Khosiat Rustam was awarded the "Shuhrat" (Fame) order by the President of the Republic of Uzbekistan in 2004 and the commemorative medal "25 years of Independence of Uzbekistan" in 2016.

She participated in several international poetry festivals and In 2012, she was the winner of the international competition held in Bursa, Turkey.

2015: National and International Mikail Mushfiq Award of Azerbaijan,

In 2017, the AMEA Nizamiy Ganjavi Institute of Literature was awarded the Honorary Decree "For the activity of scientific and literary relations between Azerbaijan and Uzbekistan".

Since 2019, she has been a member of the Writers' Union of Azerbaijan.

== Rustam's books published in Uzbekistan ==
Name of books and language	Publishing house	Year published
"House in the sky"	Gafur Gulam Publishing House	1997
"Salvation" in Uzbek	Manaviat publishing house	2003
"Rido"	New age generation	2004
"Consolation"	Namangan publishing house	2005
"Wall"	Gulam Publishing House	2006
"August"	Generation of the new age House	2008
"40:0"	Akademnashr.	2011
"Occupation" in Uzbek.	Akedemnashr publishing house	2011
"Forgotten years" in Uzbek-Turkish languages	Orzu publishing house	2014
"Uncontrolled clouds" in Uzbek	Uzbek publishing house	2019
"The beginning of the night is dark"	New Age Generation	2021
"Wandering Shadows"	Literature	2021
"Brown notebook"	Gulam Publishing House	2021
"44 days" in Uzbek-Azar languages	Arjumand media	2021

== Rustam's books published abroad ==
Name of books and language	Publishing house	Year published
"Days without tomorrow" - in Turkish	Yeni Kitaplar Publishing House	2006
"Fearful" - in the Azerbaijani language	Vektor publishing house	2008
"Anatomy of Love" - in Kazakh.	Ush Kiyan Publishing House	2019
"Colorful Tears" - in English.	EGG London Publishers	2020
"Shabbo'" - in Tajik language.	Balogat publishing house	2020
"Two Suns" - in Turkish	Günce Yayinlari Publishing House	2020
"The Wind's Case" - in Vietnamese	NHA HUAT BAN HOI Publishing House	2020
"Crazy trees" - in the Azerbaijani language	Europe	2020
"The girl's name was Lala" in the Azerbaijani language	European publishing house	2020
"Majnun tol" - in Uzbek and Azar languages	Türksoy publishing house	2020
"The Falling Wind" - in Belarusian	Vishnyooka Publishing House	2021
"Freedom in captivity" - in Tatar language	Dolya publishing house	2021
"A Star in My Hand" - in Ukrainian	Burago Publishing House	2021
"From the Heart" - in Serbian	Liberland Art Publishing House	2021
"A Handful of Wind" - in Turkmen language	Günce Yayinlari publishing house	2021
"Eight" - in Russian	Chetyre publishing house	2021
"I'm hungry" - in Kazakh	Annur Sana publishing house	2022
"The Thirteenth Month" - in Spanish	Ayame-Editotial	2022
"Open windows" - in Karakalpak language	"Bilim" publishing house	2022
"Find me in Hearts" - in English	Mundus Atrium Press	2023
"Colorless glasses" - in Arabic	Hassanbook publishing house	2023
"Poems and Diaries" - in Romanian	Bistrita-Nasaud Publishing House	2023
