= Mirmuhsin =

Mirmuhsin Mirsaidov (3 May 1921 – 3 February 2005) was a Soviet and Uzbek poet and prose writer.

== Personal life ==
Born into a poor potter's family, he began to write poetry in 1936. In 1941 he graduated from the philological faculty of Tashkent University, and in 1946 joined the CPSU. In 1950 he was appointed editor-in-chief of the magazine Shark Yulduzi ("Star of the East"), holding this post until 1960 and then re-occupying it in 1971. He also collaborated in the magazines "Mushtum" and "Gulistan". He was awarded three orders and medals: In 1968 he was awarded the title of Honored Worker of Culture of the Uzbek SSR, in 1974 he was awarded the State Hamza Prize of the Uzbek SSR, and finally in 1981 he became a People's Writer of Uzbekistan.

== Major works ==
Collections of poems Fatherland (1942), Fidelity (1945), Fergana (1949), Compatriots (1953), Guests (1954), Heart and Philosophy (1963) and others, a poem about Soviet cotton growers "Usta Giyas" (1947) and "Green kishlak" (1948), a household novel in the poems "Ziyad and Adiba" (1958). In addition to poetry, he also wrote prose: the prosaic collection Stories (1959), historical novels The White Marble (1957), The Slave (1962) (about the history of the Khiva Khanate), Night Lightning (1964, Central Asia novels about the working class "Zakalka" (book 1, 1964) and "The Son of the Foundry" (1972), the novel "Umid" (1969), dedicated to the formation of the Soviet Uzbek intelligentsia, a novel about the daily life of modern Uzbekistan "Chatkal Tiger "(1977), historical novels" The Architect "(1974) and" Temur Malik "(1985). Later works include "Vengeance of the Serpent" ("Ilon o‘chi" ,1995), "Turon malikasi" (1998). Several of his works were written for children (in particular, the collections of short stories "Stars" ("Yulduzlar", 1949), "Lola", "Plum and Uryuk" (1952)), a number of works translated into Russian.

== Awards ==
- Honored Worker of Culture of the Uzbek SSR (1968)
- State Hamza Prize (1974)
- People's Writer of the Uzbek SSR (1981)
- Order of Lenin (1991)
- Order of the Red Banner of Labour
- Two Order of the Badge of Honour (6 December 1951, 11 January 1957)
- Order of Friendship of Peoples (30 April 1981)
- Order of Respect of the Country (1998)
