= Abdulla Qahhor =

Uzbek novelist (1907–1968)

Abdulla Qahhor Абдулла Қаҳҳор
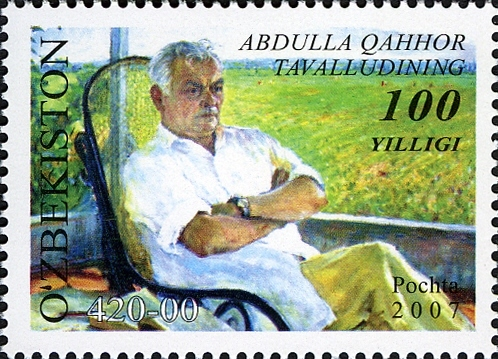
- A commemorative Uzbek stamp made in honor of Abdulla Qahhor's 100th birthday
- Born: Abdulla Qahhorov; September 17, 1907; Kokand, Fergana Oblast, Russian Empire
- Died: May 24, 1968 (aged 60); Moscow, Soviet Union
- Occupations: Novelist, short story writer, poet, playwright, and literary translator
- Writing career
- Notable awards: Stalin Prize (1952); State Hamza Prize (1966); National Writer of the Uzbek SSR (1967); Order of Outstanding Merit (2000)
- Movement: Realism

Abdulla Qahhor (Note: Uzbek: عبدالله قهار, romanized: Abdulla Qahhor, cyrillized: Абдулла Қаҳҳор, IPA: [ʔɐbdʊlˈla qɐɦˈɦɔr]; Russian: Абдулла Каххар, romanized: Abdulla Kahhar, IPA: [ɐbdʊˈla kɐˈxar]) (17 September 1907 – 24 May 1968) was a Soviet and Uzbek novelist, short story writer, poet, playwright, and literary translator. He is best known as the author of the 1951 novel Qoʻshchinor chiroqlari (The Lights of Kushchinar) and the 1958 novella Sinchalak.

Qahhor is considered to be one of the best Uzbek writers of the 20th century, and has been called the "Chekhov" of Uzbeks. He received the prestigious Stalin Prize in 1952, and became a National Writer of the Uzbek SSR in 1967. In 2000, Qahhor was posthumously awarded the Order of Outstanding Merit (Uzbek: Buyuk xizmatlari uchun), one of independent Uzbekistan's most prestigious awards.

== Life ==
Abdulla Qahhor was born on 17 September 1907 in Kokand. (Note: Some sources claim that he was born in what is now the Asht District of Tajikistan.) According to some sources, his father was a blacksmith. According to other sources, his father was a shoemaker, or, alternatively, his family were farmers.

In 1930, Qahhor entered the pedagogical faculty of Central Asia State University, graduating in 1934. He became a member of the Communist Party in 1952. From 1954 to 1956, he was the Chairman of the Union of Writers of the Uzbek SSR.

In the early years of his work, Qahhor was very good friends with Sharof Rashidov, but the two had a falling out after Rashidov did not like some of the contents of Qahhor's novel Qoʻshchinor and insisted that it be modified. The novel was later re-developed into Qoʻshchinor chiroqlari.

Qahhor died in Moscow on 24 May 1968 at the age of 60 and was buried in Tashkent.

== Works ==
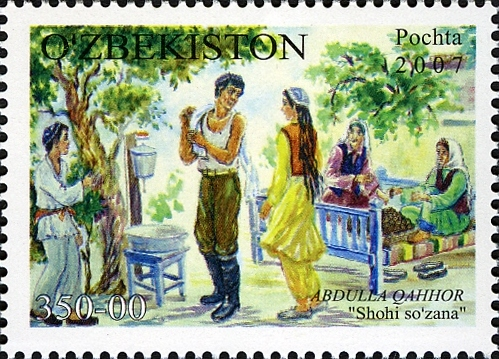
An Uzbek stamp issued in recognition of Abdulla Qahhor's play Shohi soʻzana (Silk Suzani) (1950)

Abdulla Qahhor started his writing career in 1924 by writing short stories. He began publishing his work in 1925 and went on to work as a writer for many different Uzbek-language periodicals, such as Qizil Oʻzbekiston (Red Uzbekistan), Mushtum (Fist), Yangi Farg‘ona (New Ferghana) under many different pseudonyms and pen names, including Norin shilpiq, Sarimsoq, E-Boy, Erkaboy, Gina, Gulyor, Mavlono Kufur, and Nish.

From 1934 to 1937, he worked as secretary of the Sovet adabiyoti (Soviet Literature) magazine, and from 1938 to 1950, he worked as an editor and translator at the State Publishing House of Uzbekistan.

His first poem, "Oy kuyganda" ("When the Moon Burns"), was published in Mushtum in 1924. Following the release of his first story, "Boshsiz odam" ("The Headless Man") (1929), Qahhor concentrated on prose writing. His first book, Qishloq hukmi ostida (Under the Rule of the Village), was published in 1932. His first collection of stories, Olam yasharadi (The World Becomes Young), was published in 1933.

Qahhor's stories "Asror bobo" ("Grandpa Asror"), "Dardaqdan chiqqan qahramon" ("A Hero from Dardaq"), "Kampirlar sim qoqdi" ("Old Women Rang"), "Xotinlar" ("Women"), and "Oltin yulduz" ("The Golden Star") depict the courage of Uzbek soldiers and the hard work of Uzbek workers during the Soviet-German war against Nazi Germany and its allies.

Qahhor's other novels and stories include Sarob (Mirage) (1935), Oʻgʻri (The Thief) (1936), Bemor (The Patient) (1936), Qoʻshchinor chiroqlari (The Lights of Qoʻshchinor) (1951), Oʻtmishdan ertaklar (Stories from the Past) (1965), Muhabbat (Love) (1968), Mahalla (Neighborhood), Millatchilar (Nationalists), and others. He is also known for his plays Shohi soʻzana (Silk Suzani) (1950), Ogʻriq tishlar (Hurting Teeth) (1954), Tobutdan tovush (A Sound from the Coffin) (1962), and Ayajonlarim (My Dear Mothers) (1967).

Qahhor translated the works of many Russian writers, such as Leo Tolstoy, Alexander Pushkin, Anton Chekhov, and Nikolai Gogol into the Uzbek language. In particular, he translated The Captain's Daughter of Pushkin, Marriage and The Government Inspector of Gogol, and, together with his wife Kibriyo Qahhorova, War and Peace of Leo Tolstoy. While his translations have been widely praised by many authors and critics, some of his earlier translations were criticized for incorrectly conveying the meaning of texts.

== Influence and legacy ==
During the Soviet era, Qahhor's works were quite popular in the Baltics. He also influenced numerous Uzbek writers, including Oʻtkir Hoshimov, Erkin Vohidov, and Abdulla Oripov. There is a house-museum dedicated to his memory that was founded in 1987.

Archives show that he issued denunciations of other Uzbek writers to Soviet authorities.

== Awards ==
- Stalin prize (1952)
- Three Orders of the Red Banner of Labor (6 December 1951, 16 September 1957, 8 September 1967)
- Order of the Badge of Honor (31 January 1939)
- People's Writer of the Uzbek SSR (8 September 1967)
- State Hamza Prize (1966)
- Order of Outstanding Merit (25 August 2000)
