= Erkin Vohidov =

Uzbek poet, playwright, literary translator, and statesman

Erkin Vohidov Эркин Воҳидов
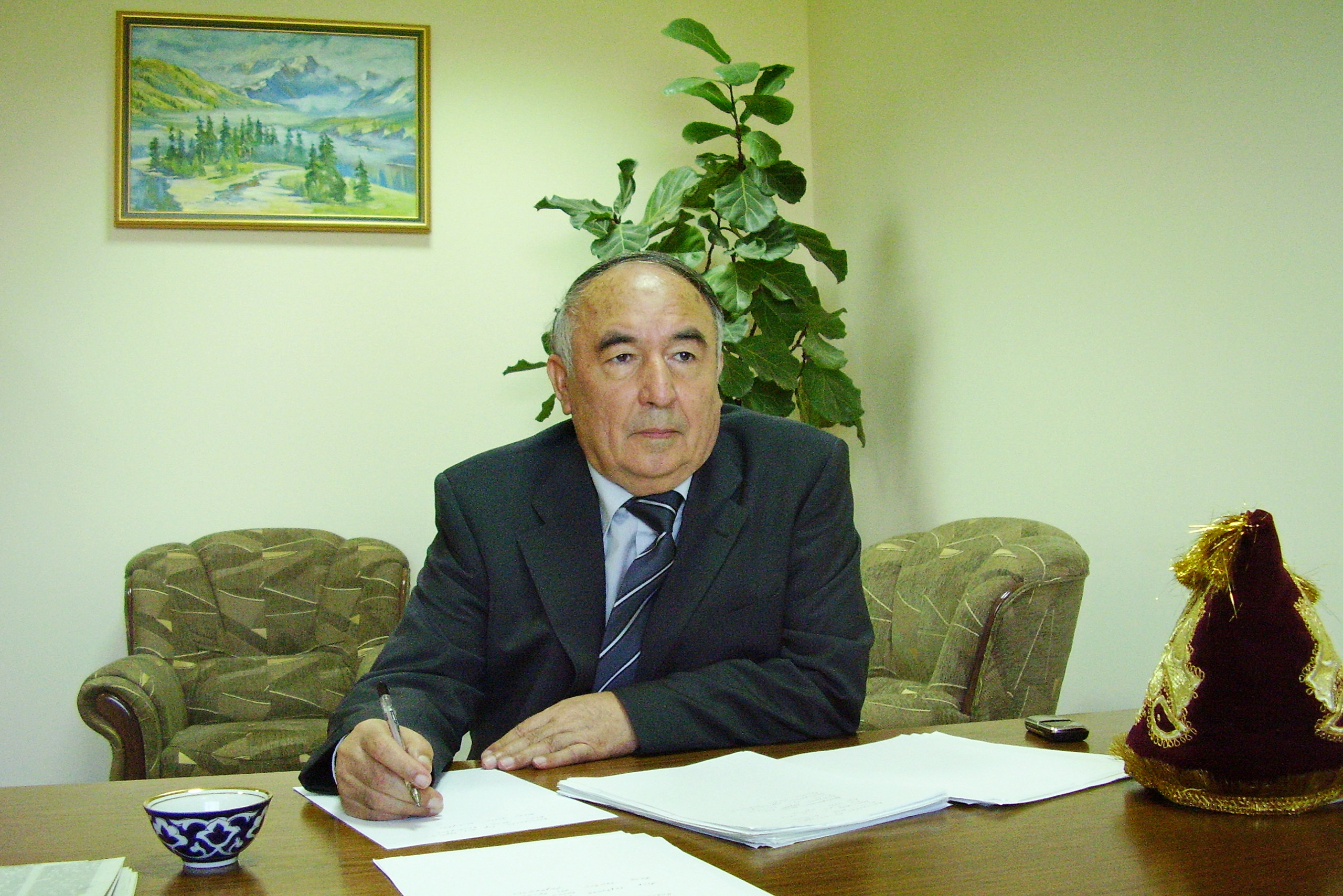
- Erkin Vohidov in 2006
- Born: December 28, 1936; Oltiariq District, Fergana Region, Uzbek Soviet Socialist Republic, USSR
- Died: May 30, 2016 (aged 79); Tashkent, Uzbekistan
- Occupations: Poet, playwright, literary translator, statesman
- Writing career
- Notable awards: Lenin Komsomol Prize (1967); State Hamza Prize (1983); People's Poet of the Uzbek SSR (1987); Hero of Uzbekistan (1999)

Erkin Vohidov (Note: Uzbek: Erkin Vohidov, Эркин Воҳидов; Russian: Эркин Вахидов, romanized: Erkin Vakhidov.) (December 28, 1936 – May 30, 2016) was an Uzbek poet, playwright, literary translator, and statesman. In addition to writing his own poetry, Vohidov translated the works of many famous foreign poets, such as Aleksandr Tvardovsky, Johann Wolfgang von Goethe, Muhammad Iqbal, Rasul Gamzatov, and Sergey Yesenin into the Uzbek language. Particularly noteworthy are his translations of Yesenin's works and Goethe's Faust.

In 1983, Vahidov was awarded the State Hamza Prize for his poetry collection Sharqiy qirgʻoq. He became a People's Poet of Uzbekistan in 1987. In 1999, he was awarded the title Hero of Uzbekistan, the highest honorary title that can be bestowed on a citizen by Uzbekistan.

Vohidov's poems remain popular and are frequently published in anthologies. Dozens of his poems have been set to music by various artists, mostly notably by Sherali Joʻrayev. On occasion of the 75th anniversary of the United Nations in October 2020, a song entitled "Human" and based on Vohidov's poem "Inson" ("Human") was released with lyrics in Arabic, English, Italian, Kazakh, Russian, Tajik, Turkish and Uzbek.

== Life ==
Erkin Vohidovich Vohidov was born on December 28, 1936, in Oltiariq District, Fergana Region, then the Uzbek Soviet Socialist Republic. His father, Choʻyanboy Vohidov, fought in the Soviet-German war against Nazi Germany and its allies and died in Tashkent after his return from the war. Vohidov was nine years old at the time. He reminisced about the hardships of the war years as follows:

While my father was fighting in the war, my mother worked as a secretary at the village council. We led a difficult life. I will never forget how my mother slapped my face and cried all day because I had sliced my tongue sucking a corn stalk and had eaten oil cake along with other kids.

In 1945, Vohidov moved to Tashkent with his mother, Roziyaxon Vohidova, who also soon died. He was raised by his uncle, Karimboy Sohiboyev. It was Vohidov's uncle who sparked his interest in poetry:

Even though my uncle was a lawyer, he was passionate about literature and art and appreciated poetry. I used to be amazed by the clever discussions of the poet Chustiy, singers the Shojalilov brothers, Maʼrufxoʻja Bahodirov, great scholar and translator Alixon Sogʻuniy, ordinary mailman Mulla Shukurjon, salesman Akmalxon – all of whom used to frequent our home. They would study the couplets of Hafez, Navoiy, Bedil and Fuzûlî and everyone would express his own interpretation. There was no alcohol, only intoxication with poetry and songs and the joy of jokes.

After graduating from the National University of Uzbekistan (then Tashkent State University) with a degree in philology in 1960, he started working at various publishing houses. Vohidov died on May 30, 2016, at the age of 79.

== Work ==
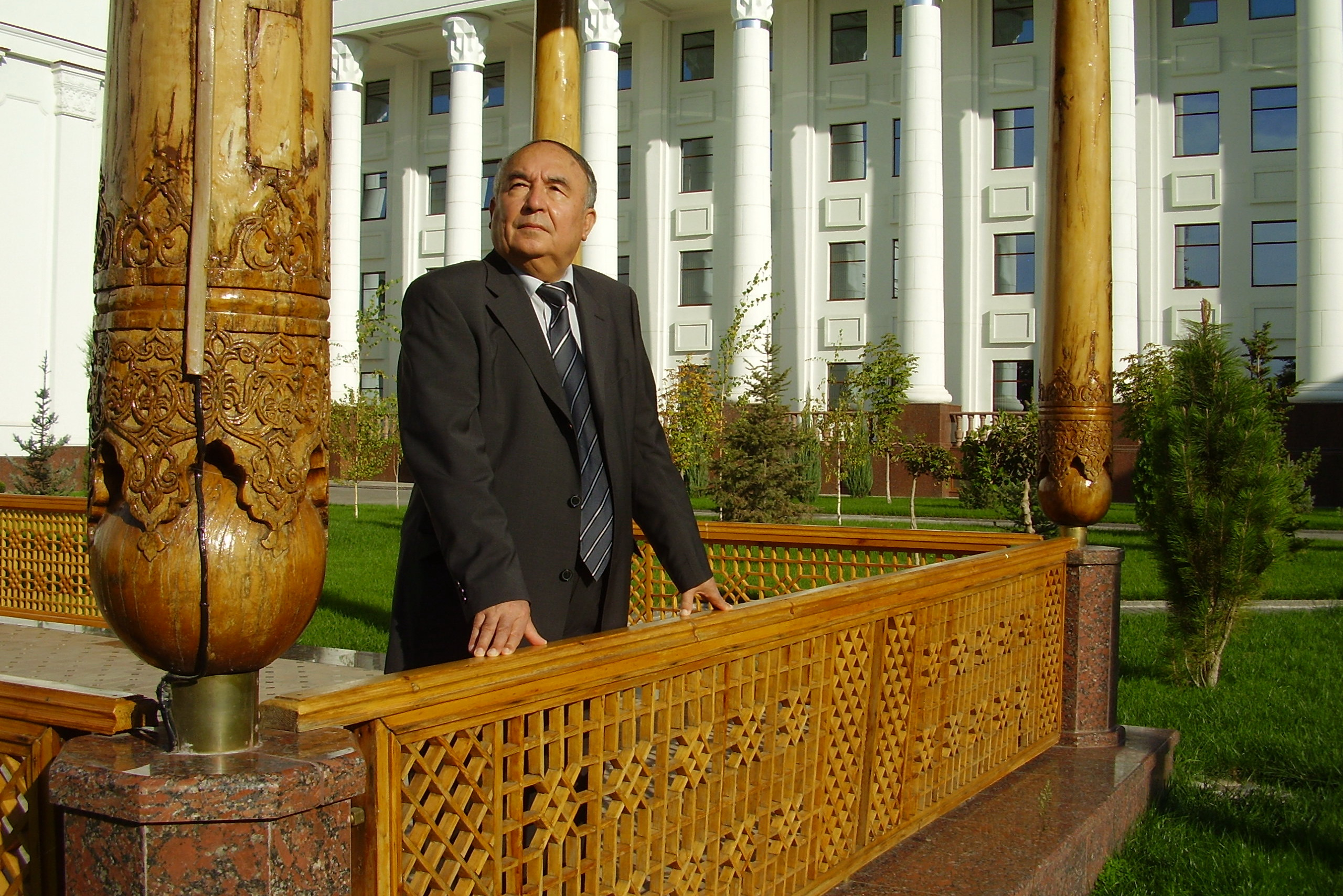
Erkin Vohidov in 2006

Vohidov worked as an editor at Yosh Gvardiya, the Uzbek branch of Molodaya Gvardiya, from 1960 to 1963. He also served as editor‑in‑chief at the same publishing house from 1975 to 1982. Vohidov was also editor‑in‑chief (1963–1970) and director (1985–1987) of Gʻafur Gʻulom, another publishing house in Tashkent. From 1982 to 1985, he worked as the head of the monthly periodical Yoshlik (Childhood). After Uzbekistan gained independence, he served as chairman of the Committee on International Affairs and Inter‑parliamentary Relations of the Oliy Majlis of Uzbekistan (1995–2005) and as chairman of the Senate Committee on Science, Education, Culture, and Sport (2005–2009).

Vohidov began writing poetry during his student years. His first poem was published in the Mushtum magazine when he was fourteen years old. Vohidov's first collection of poems, Tong nafasi (The Breath of Morning), was published in 1961. In 1987, he published a collection of literary essays entitled Shoiru, sheʼru shuur: Adabiy esselar (The Poet, the Poem, and the Mind: Literary Essays). Vohidov wrote three plays: Oltin devor (The Golden Wall), Istanbul fojiasi (The Istanbul Tragedy), and Ikkinchi tumor (The Second Talisman). His play Oltin devor was staged in Lahore, Pakistan.

=== Poetry collections ===
The following is a list of Vohidov's books of poetry:

- Tong nafasi (The Breath of Morning) (1961)
- Qoʻshiqlarim sizga (My Songs are for You) (1962)
- Yurak va aql (The Heart and the Mind) (1963)
- Mening yulduzim (My Star) (1964)
- Nido (The Appeal) (1965)
- Lirika (Lyricism) (1965)
- Palatkada yozilgan doston (The Poem That was Written in a Tent) (1967)
- Yoshlik devoni (The Diwan of Youth) (1969)
- Charogʻbon (1970)
- Quyosh maskani (The Land of the Sun) (1972)
- Dostonlar (Poems) (1973)
- Muhabbat (Love) (1976)
- Tirik sayyoralar (The Living Planets) (1978)
- Ruhlar isyoni (The Rise of the Spirits) (1980)
- Sharqiy qirgʻoq (The East Coast) (1980)
- Kelajakka maktub (A Letter to the Future) (1983)
- Bedorlik (Insomnia) (1985)
- Hozirgi yoshlar (The Youth of Today) (1986)
- Saylanma (Selected Works)
  - Birinchi jild: Muhabbatnoma (Volume I: Muhabbat-Name) (1986)
  - Ikkinchi jild: Sadoqatnoma (Volume II: Sadakat-Name) (1986)
- Daraxtlar suhbati (The Talk of the Trees) (1988)
- Kuy avjida uzilmasin tor (Don't Let the Strings Brake While Playing) (1991)
- Oʻrtada begona yoʻq (There is No Stranger in Between) (1991)
- Yaxshidir achchiq haqiqat (The Bitter Truth is Better) (1992)
- Qumursqalar jangi (Battle of the Ants) (1993)
- Mening yulduzim (My Star) (2000)
- Saylanma (Selected Works)
  - Birinchi jild: Ishq savdosi (Volume I: The Quest of Love) (2000)
  - Ikkinchi jild: Sheʼr dunyosi (Volume II: The World of Poetry) (2001)
  - Uchinchi jild: Umrim daryosi (Volume III: The River of My Life) (2001)
- Oʻzbegim (My Uzbek People) (2006)
- Orzuli dunyo (A World With Dreams) (2010)
- Tabassum (Laughter) (2010)
- Yangi sheʼrlar (New Poems) (2014)
- Zamin sayyorasi (Planet Earth) (2014)
- Devon: Senga baxtdan taxt tilarman (2015)
- Inson (Human) (2015)
- Saylanma (Selected Works)
  - Birinchi jild: Bahor tarovati (Volume I: The Freshness of the Spring) (2015)
  - Ikkinchi jild: Yoz harorati (Volume II: The Hot of the Summer) (2015)
  - Uchinchi jild: Kuz saxovati (Volume III: The Bounty of the Fall) (2016)
  - Toʻrtinchi jild: Qish halovati (Volume IV: The Quiet of the Winter) (2016)

=== Prose ===
- Adabiy portretlar (Literary Portraits) (1985) (co-author)
- Shoiru, sheʼru shuur: Adabiy esselar (The Poet, the Poem, and the Mind: Literary Essays) (1987)
- Iztirob (Suffering) (1991)
- Saylanma (Selected Works)
  - Toʻrtinchi jild: Koʻngil nidosi (Volume IV: The Cry of the Heart) (2001)
- Soʻz latofati (The Elegance of Words) (2014)
- Saylanma (Selected Works)
  - Beshinchi jild: Qalb sadoqati (Volume V: The Loyalty of the Heart) (2018)
  - Oltinchi jild: Erk saodati (Volume VI: The Joy of Freedom) (2018)

=== Russian translations of his poems ===
Many of Vohidov's poems were translated into Russian. The following is a list of his poetry books that were published in Russian:

- Лирика (Lyricism) (1970)
- Стихи (Poems) (1974)
- Узелок на память (A Knot to Remember) (1980)
- Восстание бессмертных (The Rise of the Spirits) (1983)
- Линия жизни (The Line of Life) (1984)
- В минуту песни не порвись, струна... (Don't Let the Strings Brake While Playing) (1986)

=== Literary translations ===
Vohidov translated the works of many famous foreign poets, such as Alexander Blok, Aleksandr Tvardovsky, Friedrich Schiller, Johann Wolfgang von Goethe, Lesya Ukrainka, Mikhail Svetlov, Muhammad Iqbal, Rasul Gamzatov, Sergey Yesenin, and Silva Kaputikyan into the Uzbek language. In particular, he translated Goethe's Faust into Uzbek in 1974. Especially noteworthy are his translations of Yesenin's works into Uzbek. Below is Vohidov's translation of Yesenin's farewell poem "Goodbye, my friend, goodbye" (1925):

Original in Russian

До свиданья, друг мой, до свиданья.
Милый мой, ты у меня в груди.
Предназначенное расставанье
Обещает встречу впереди.

До свиданья, друг мой, без руки, без слова,
Не грусти и не печаль бровей, —
В этой жизни умирать не ново,
Но и жить, конечно, не новей.

English translation

Goodbye, my friend, goodbye
My love, you are in my heart.
It was preordained we should part
And be reunited by and by.

Goodbye: no handshake to endure.
Let's have no sadness — furrowed brow.
There's nothing new in dying now
Though living is no newer.

Vohidov's translation into Uzbek

Xayr endi, xayr, doʻstginam,
Bagʻrimdasan, koʻngil malhami.
Muqarrar bu ayriliqning ham
Visoli bor oldinda hali.

Xayr, doʻstim, soʻzga ochma lab,
Qoʻy, men uchun oʻrtama bagʻir,
Bu hayotda oʻlmoq-ku bor gap,
Yashamoq ham yangimas, axir!

Vohidov's own works in Uzbek have been translated into Russian, German, French, English, Urdu, Hindi, Arabic and many other Turkic languages. The Soviet poet Robert Rozhdestvensky thought very highly of Vohidov's work.

An example of Vohidov's original work follows (from his poem "Oʻzbegim/Ўзбегим" ("My Uzbek People"):

Original Uzbek (Cyrillic)

Ортда қолди кўҳна тарих,
Ортда қолди дард, ситам,
Кетди ваҳминг, битди заҳминг,
Топди дармон, ўзбегим.

Original Uzbek (Latin)

Ortda qoldi koʻhna tarix,
Ortda qoldi dard, sitam,
Ketdi vahming, bitdi zahming,
Topdi darmon, oʻzbegim.

English translation

Left behind is old history
Left behind are pain and injustice
Your nightmare is gone, your wounds are healed
A remedy is found, my Uzbeks.

=== Poems set to music ===
Many of his poems have been turned into songs by Uzbek artists. Two of the most famous Vohidov poems that have become the lyrics to well-known Uzbek songs are "Inson" ("Human") and "Oʻzbegim" ("My Uzbek People"), both sung by Sherali Joʻrayev.

Year poem was written	Poem title	Song	Performed by	Composer
1956	Kamtarlik haqida	Yursin karvonlar (chorus only)	Yulduz Usmonova	
1959	***	Sevgi	Nargiz	
1959	***	Oʻn sakkizga kirmagan kim bor	Fahriddin Umarov	
1964	***	Bolalarni shaytonlardan qoʻrqitmangiz	Rustam Gʻoipov	
1961	Yoshlik	Yoshligim (verses only; Uzbek version of "Million Roses")	Muhabbat Mehmonova	Raimonds Pauls
1967	Barcha shodlik senga boʻlsin	Barcha shodlik senga boʻlsin	Shohruxxon va Nilufar Usmonova	Shohruxxon
1967	Doʻst bilan obod uying	Doʻst bilan obod uying	Gulbahor Erqulova	
1967	Uygʻotmagil...	Uygʻotmagil	Ravshan Zokirov	Ravshan Zokirov
1968	Tola soch	Habibi	Bunyodbek Saidov	Alisher Shaydo
1968	Sevgi	Sevgi	Bobur Yusupov	Bobur Yusupov
1968	Oʻrtada begona yoʻq	Oʻrtada begona yoʻq	Sherali Joʻrayev	
1968	Oʻzbegim	Oʻzbegim	Sherali Joʻrayev	Sherali Joʻrayev
1968	Oʻzbegim	Oʻzbegim	Setora	
1973	Inson	Human/Ода о человеке	Ozodbek Nazarbekov, Dilafruz Rustamova, Oleg Gazmanov, Omirkul Ayniyazov, Zafar Abdualimov, Rafet El Roman, Ahmed Al Huraibi, Alessandro Safina	Nodir Umarov
1973	Inson	Inson	Sherali Joʻrayev	
1976	Bir qadam	Bir qadam	Zulayho Boyxonova	
1977	Navoiy gʻazaliga muxammas	Kema	Sherali Joʻrayev	
1988	Yaxshidir achchiq haqiqat	Achchiq haqiqat	Sherali Joʻrayev	
1994	Biz anglamagan jahon ekan ishq	Ishq	Abzal Husanov	Abzal Husanov
1998	***	Mohitabonim	Ziyoda Qobilova	

== Legacy ==
Vohidov is one of the most beloved poets among Uzbeks. Many places and institutions in Uzbekistan are named after him. In 2018, a boarding school bearing his name was established in the city of Margilan. The following year, the Erkin Vohidov Museum opened its doors in Margilan.

Several books have been written on the life and works of Vohidov, including Erkin Vohidov saboqlari (Lessons by Erkin Vohidov) (2016), To quyosh sochgayki nur (As Long As the Sun Shines) (2016), Soʻz sehri (The Magic of Language), and Oʻzbegimning Erkin oʻzbegi (The Erkin of My Uzbek People).

== Awards ==
- Hero of Uzbekistan (1999)
- People's Poet of the Uzbek SSR (1987)
- State Hamza Prize (1983)
- Lenin Komsomol Prize (1967)
- Order of the Badge of Honor
- Medal "For Distinguished Labour"
- Order of Outstanding Merit (30 November 1996)
