= Oybek (writer) =

Uzbek-Soviet writer, poet and translator (1905–1968)

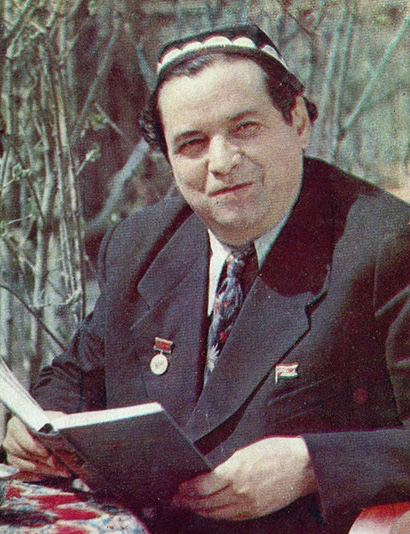
- Born: Muso Toshmuhammad oʻgʻli January 10, 1905; Tashkent, Russian Turkestan
- Died: July 1, 1968 (aged 63); Tashkent, Uzbek SSR
- Occupations: Poet, writer and literary translator
- Writing career
- Notable awards: Order of the Badge of Honour (1951); State Hamza Prize (1964); National Poet of the Uzbek SSR (1965); Order of Lenin; Order of Outstanding Merit

Muso Toshmuhammad oʻgʻli (Russified form Musa Tashmukhamedov) (Uzbek: Muso Toshmuhammad oʻgʻli, Мусо Тошмуҳаммад ўғли) (January 10, 1905 – July 1, 1968), known by the pen name Oybek, was an Uzbek, Soviet writer, poet and translator. He was a People's Writer of the Uzbek SSR (1965), Academician of the Academy of Sciences of the Uzbek SSR (1943), recipient of the Stalin Prize of the first degree (1946), member of the All-Union Communist Party of Bolsheviks (since 1948). He was also a deputy of the Supreme Soviet of the USSR of the 5th and 6th convocations.

== Biography ==
Muso Toshmuhammad oʻgʻli was born on 28 December 1904 (10 January 1905) in Tashkent in a poor family of a weaver, who roamed with his goods in the steppe and mountainous villages of the then Russian Turkestan.

At that time, members of the poor class who wanted to educate their children could only enroll them in elementary schools. The writer reflected his memories of this school in the story "Childhood" (1962), which was published in 1963. The story is a brilliant example of memoir literature. Oybek, following little Musa, step by step reveals his life path, shows the formation of his character, the formation of personality. Together with the changes in society, the moral ideals and views of the little hero change and his dreams and aspirations become more and more vivid.

As many Uzbek writers, Oybek began his literary path with poetry. In 1923, his first poem "Whose Land?" was published. He is one of the first Uzbek novelists. He wrote such works as: "Sacred Blood", "Navoi", "The Wind of the Golden Valley", "The Sun Will Not Fade", "The Great Way". He started writing when he was a student at the economic faculty of the Central Asian State University, which he graduated from in 1930.

The writer's first major novel "Sacred Blood" (1943), is dedicated to the life of the peoples of Central Asia and Uzbekistan during the World War I. This novel was screened at the Uzbekfilm studio.

Since his youth, Oybek was fascinated by the works of the great Uzbek poet and philosopher Ali-Shir Nava'i. However, before writing a work about him, the writer thoroughly studied and reviewed huge archival material. In the 1930s Oybek worked on the creation of the image of the great philosopher, poet and political figure Ali-Shir Nava'i. Oybek wanted Navoi's songs to fly over the earth like a nightingale.

In 1939 he wrote a poem about the great poet, and in 1943 he completed a novel in which Oybek showed Navoi only as a public and statesman. His creative path is mentioned only in passing and then only at the end of the book. The significance of the novel "Navoiy", as one of the best realistic works, goes far beyond the borders of Uzbek literature. It has been translated into many languages, including Russian.

During the years of persecution of Crimean Tatars, Oybek supported the writer Şamil Alâdin, helping him several times to get a job. With his assistance, the Crimean Tatar press began to be published in Uzbekistan in the 1950s.

He is the author of a number of studies, scientific articles, reviews: "The Creative Way of Abdulla Kadyri" (1936), "Uzbek Poetry of Recent Years" (1933), "Uzbek Literature" (1943), "Literature, History, Modernity" (1966).

Oybek is also known as a translator from Russian into Uzbek. He translated into Uzbek such works as: "Eugene Onegin" by Pushkin, "Faust" by Goethe, "Masquerade" by Lermontov, Gorky, Homer (excerpts from "Iliad"), the epic "David of Sassoun", Belinsky and others.

He was engaged in a lot of public work, being a member of the Writers Union of Uzbekistan. He was a deputy of the USSR Supreme Soviet of the 2nd convocation (1946-1950) and of the 5th-6th convocations (1958-1966).

He died on 1 July 1968. He was buried in Tashkent at the Chigatai Memorial Cemetery.

A station of the Tashkent subway is named in his memory. The Qashqadaryo Regional Uzbek Musical Drama Theater and Termez State Pedagogical Institute were also named after him.

== Influence ==
Archives show that he issued denunciations of other Uzbek writers to Soviet authorities. His 1935 pamphlet criticizing Abdulla Qodiriy's novels was used as evidence in his prosecution before he was executed. Oybek later grew to severely regret his actions.

== Awards and prizes ==
- People's Writer of the Uzbek SSR (23 September 1965)
- Stalin Prize 1st class (1946) - for the novel "Navoi" (1945)
- State Hamza Prize - for the novella Detstvo (1964)
- Three Order of Lenin (24 December 1944, 16 January 1950, 11 January 1957)
- Two Order of the Red Banner of Labour (2 April 1955,?)
- Order of the Badge of Honour (6 December 1951)
- Order of Outstanding Merit (25 August 2000)
- various other awards
