= Abdulla Qodiriy =

Uzbek poet, literary translator, and writer

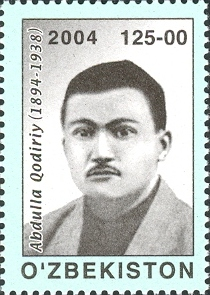
- An Uzbek stamp made in honor of Abdulla Qodiriy
- Born: April 10, 1894; Tashkent, Russian Turkestan
- Died: October 4, 1938 (aged 44); Tashkent, Uzbek SSR, Soviet Union
- Occupations: Playwright, poet, writer, and literary translator

Abdulla Qodiriy (Note: Uzbek: Abdulla Qodiriy, Абдулла Қодирий; Russian: Абдулла́ Кадыри́, romanized: Abdulla Kadiri. Spelled Abdullah Qodiriy and Abdullah Kadiri in some English sources.) (April 10, 1894 – October 4, 1938) was an Uzbek playwright, poet, writer, and literary translator. Qodiriy was one of the most influential Uzbek writers of the 20th century. He introduced realism into Uzbek literature through his historical novels and influenced many other Central Asian novelists.

Qodiriy wrote under various pen names, the most renowned being Julqunboy. His early works were influenced by the Jadid movement. Qodiriy was executed during the Great Purge under Joseph Stalin.

== Life ==
Abdulla Qodiriy was born on April 10, 1894, in Tashkent, then Russian Turkestan. His father, Qodirbobo, was 74 years old when Qodiriy was born. Qodiriy did a variety of menial jobs before a merchant hired him as a book copier. He became interested in writing in the middle of the 1910s.

Qodiriy was briefly arrested in 1926 for his article "Yigʻindi gaplar" ("A Collection of Rumors") that was published in Mushtum. Later, he enjoyed the protection and patronage of the Uzbek communist party leader, Akmal Ikramov, but was left exposed by Ikramov's arrest in 1937. He was arrested again on December 31, 1937, as "enemy of the people". He was executed on October 4, 1938, in Tashkent.

== Work ==
Qodiriy's most famous works are the historical novels Oʻtgan kunlar (Bygone Days) (1922) and Mehrobdan chayon (Scorpion in the Pulpit) (1929). Oʻtgan kunlar is the first full-length novel by an Uzbek author. Qodiriy's stories Kalvak Mahzumning xotira daftaridan (From Mahzum the Simpleton's Diary) and Toshpoʻlat tajang nima deydir? (What Does Irritate Toshpoʻlat Say?) are considered to be some of the best satirical stories in Uzbek.

Qodiriy also wrote many plays and numerous newspaper articles. He was fluent in Arabic, Persian, and Russian. Qodiriy translated into the Uzbek language the works of many Russian writers, such as Nikolai Gogol and Anton Chekhov. In particular, he translated Gogol's Marriage (1842) into Uzbek. He is rumoured to have written another novel, Emir Umar's Slave Girl, set in the early nineteenth century during the reigns of Emir Umar, khan of Kokand, and his son, Matali. This novel (if it existed) is assumed to have been destroyed by the NKVD after Qodiriy's arrest.

Oybek's 1935 pamphlet criticizing his novels was used as evidence in his prosecution before he was executed.

== In literature ==
Qodiriy is the central character in the novel Jinlar bazmi yoxud katta o'yin (The Devils' Dance) by Hamid Ismailov, published in Tashkent in 2016, and translated into English in 2018. This is a fictionalised account of Qodiriy's arrest, interrogation and execution, containing within it Ismailov's version of Qodiriy's last, lost novel, which the author imagines him composing in his head while he is in prison.

== Legacy ==
The Tashkent State Institute of Culture in Tashkent was named after Qodiriy (spelt Kadiri); in 2012 this institute merged with the Uzbekistan Institute of Arts to become the Uzbekistan State Institute of Arts and Culture. Children: Khabibulla Qodiriy, Adiba Abdullaeva, Anisa Abdullaeva, Nazifa Abdullaeva, Masud Abdullaev.

On 17 April 2026 Uzbekistan private cargo carrier My Freighter Airlines expanded its aviation park with the arrival of a new Boeing 767 named after Abdulla Qodiriy.
