= Abdulla Oripov (poet) =

Uzbek poet and politician (1941–2016)

Hero of Uzbekistan Abdulla Oripov Абдулла Орипов
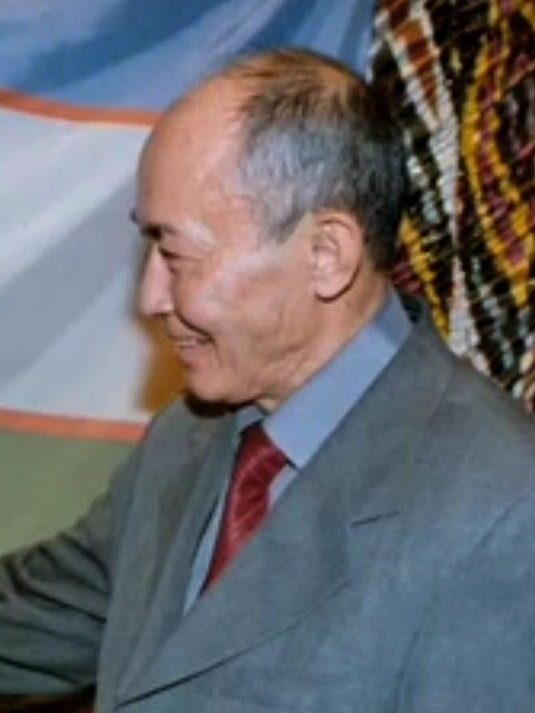
- Born: 21 March 1941; Village Nekuz, Qashqadaryo, Uzbek SSR, USSR
- Died: 5 November 2016 (aged 75); Houston, Texas, United States
- Occupations: Poet, literary translator, and a politician
- Family: Bibisora Oripova
- Awards: Lenin Komsomol Prize of the Uzbek SSR (1972); State Hamza Prize (1983); People's Poet of the Uzbek SSR (1989); Alisher Navoiy State Prize (1992); Hero of Uzbekistan (1998)

Abdulla Oripov (Note: Uzbek: Abdulla Oripov, Абдулла Орипов; Russian: Абдулла Арипов, romanized: Abdulla Aripov.) (21 March 1941 – 5 November 2016) was an Uzbek poet, literary translator, and a politician. He is best known as the author of the lyrics to the State Anthem of Uzbekistan. In addition to writing his own poetry, Oripov translated the works of many famous foreign poets, such as Alexander Pushkin, Dante Alighieri, Nizami Ganjavi, and Taras Shevchenko, into the Uzbek language.

Oripov was also a statesman. He was a member of the Senate of Uzbekistan from 2005 until his death in 2016. He also served as the head of the Copyright Committee of Uzbekistan from 2000 until his death.

Oripov received many awards during his lifetime. He became a National Poet of the Uzbek SSR in 1989. In 1998, he was awarded the title Hero of Uzbekistan, the highest honorary title that can be bestowed on a citizen by Uzbekistan.

== Life ==
Abdulla Oripov was born on 21 March 1941, in the village of Nekuz in Qashqadaryo, then the Uzbek Soviet Socialist Republic. His sister Bibisora Oripova is a surgeon and a women's rights activist. In 1958, Oripov graduated from high school with honors. In 1963, he graduated from Tashkent State University with a degree in journalism. Oripov had six children, five daughters and a son. He died on November 5, 2016, in Houston after a long illness.

== Work ==
Oripov started writing poetry during his student years. His first collection of poems, Mitti yulduz (The Little Star), was published in 1965.

From 1963 to 1974, Oripov worked at the Yosh gvardiya (1963–1968) and Gaʻfur Gʻulom (1968–1974) publishing houses. Between 1974 and 1980, he worked for different periodicals, such as Sharq yulduzi (The Eastern Star) and Gulxan (Bonfire).

In 1971, Oripov became a member of the Writers' Union of Uzbekistan. From 1994 until 2009, he served as the head of the union.

Oripov was also a statesman. He was a member of the Senate of Uzbekistan from 2005 until his death in 2016. He also served as the head of the Copyright Committee of Uzbekistan from 2000 until his death.

=== Literary works ===
The following is a list of Oripov's books of poetry:

- Mitti yulduz (The Little Star) (1965)
- Koʻzlarim yoʻlingda (Waiting for You) (1966)
- Onajon (Dear Mother) (1969)
- Ruhim (My Spirit) (1971)
- Oʻzbekiston (Uzbekistan) (1972)
- Qasida (The Ode) (1972)
- Hayrat (Wonder) (1974)
- Xotirot (Memories) (1974)
- Yurtim shamoli (The Winds of My Country) (1974)
- Jannatga yoʻl (The Road to Heaven) (1978)
- Hakim va ajal (The Sage and Death) (1980)
- Najot qal’asi (The Castle of Hope) (1981)
- Surat va siyrat (The Picture and the Soul) (1981)
- Yillar armoni (Dreams of the Years Gone By) (1984)
- Ishonch koʻpriklari (The Bridges of Trust) (1989)
- Haj daftari (The Hajj Diary) (1992)
- Munojot (1992)
- Dunyo (The World) (1995)
- Saylanma (Selected Works) (1996)
- Sohibqiron (Tamerlane) (1996)
- Savob (Thawab) (1997)
- Asarlar (Works) (2001) (In four volumes)
- Birinchi muhabbatim (My First Love) (2005)
- Everest va ummon (Everest and the Ocean) (2015)
- Tutash dunyolar (Connected Worlds) (2015)

Oripov also penned a book on poetry, Ehtiyoj farzandi (The Son of Necessity), in 1988.

=== Literary translations ===
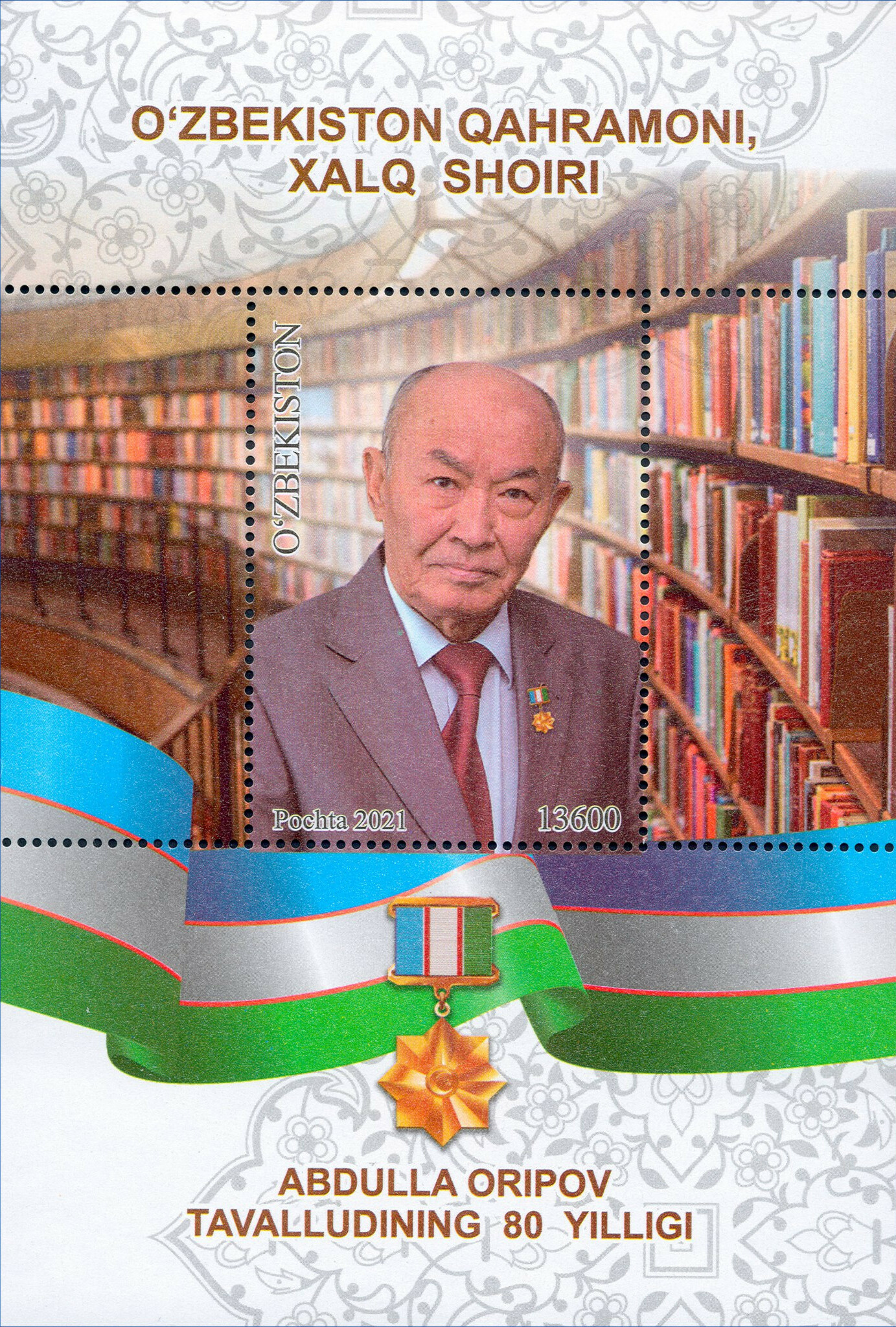
Oripov on a 2021 stamp of Uzbekistan

Oripov translated the works of many famous foreign poets, such as Alexander Pushkin, Dante Alighieri, Harivansh Rai Bachchan, Jenő Heltai, Kersti Merilaas, Khalil Rza Uluturk, Lesya Ukrainka, Nikola Vaptsarov, Nikolay Nekrasov, Nizami Ganjavi, Qaysin Quli, Sergey Baruzdin, Taras Shevchenko, and Yeghishe Charents, into the Uzbek language. In particular, he translated Dante's Divine Comedy into Uzbek. Oripov's own works in Uzbek have been translated into Russian and many other languages.

== Awards ==
Oripov received many awards during his lifetime. In 1981, he was awarded the State Hamza Prize. In 1984, he was awarded the Order of the Badge of Honor. In 1989, he became a National Poet of the Uzbek SSR. In 1992, he received the prestigious Alisher Navoiy State Prize. In 1998, he was awarded the title Hero of Uzbekistan, the highest honorary title that can be bestowed on a citizen by Uzbekistan.

In 2023, the feature film "Abdulla Oripov" was released.
