= Gʻafur Gʻulom =

Uzbek poet, writer, and translator (1903–1966)

Gʻafur Gʻulom Ғафур Ғулом
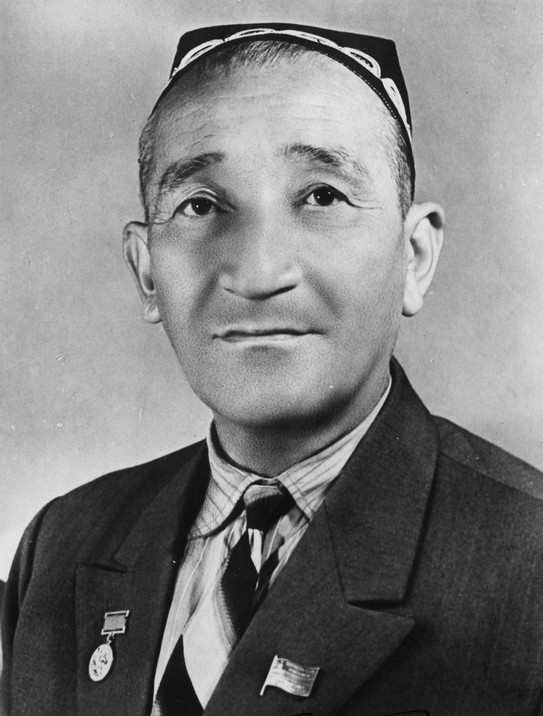
- Born: Gʻafur Gʻulomovich Gʻulomov; May 10, 1903; Tashkent, Russian Turkestan
- Died: July 10, 1966 (aged 63); Tashkent, Uzbek SSR, Soviet Union
- Occupations: Poet, teacher, literary translator, and writer
- Children: Kadyr Gulyamov
- Writing career
- Notable awards: Order of the Red Banner of Labour (1939); Order of the Badge of Honour (1944); State Stalin Prize (1946); People's Poet of the Uzbek SSR (1963); Order of the Red Banner of Labour (1963); Lenin Prize (1970); National Order of Merit (2000)
- Movement: Realism

Gʻafur Gʻulom (Note: Uzbek: Gʻafur Gʻulom, Ғафур Ғулом; Russian: Гафур Гулям, romanized: Gafur Gulyam.) (May 10, 1903 – July 10, 1966) was an Uzbek poet, writer, and literary translator. He is best remembered for his stories Shum Bola (The Mischievous Boy) (adapted for film in 1977) and Yodgor. Gʻafur Gʻulom is also known for translating the works of many influential foreign authors, such as Alexander Pushkin, Vladimir Mayakovsky, and William Shakespeare. He translated Le Mariage de Figaro of Pierre Beaumarchais, Othello of William Shakespeare, and Gulistan of Saadi Shirazi into Uzbek.

Gʻafur Gʻulom is considered to be one of the most influential Uzbek writers of the 20th century. He is also regarded as one of the founders of modern Uzbek poetry, along with Hamza Hakimzoda Niyoziy. Gʻafur Gʻulom received the prestigious State Stalin Prize in 1946 and became a National Poet of the Uzbek SSR in 1963.

== Life ==
Gʻafur Gʻulomovich Gʻulomov was born to a poor family on May 10, 1903, in Tashkent. His father, Gʻulom Mirza Orif, knew Russian and was fond of reading poems and could himself write poetry. He died when Gʻafur Gʻulom was only nine years old.

Gʻafur Gʻulom first went to a so-called old school, a quasi-Muslim school, and later enrolled in a Russian tuzem school (Russian: Ру́сско-тузе́мная шко́ла), an elementary school for non-Russians in Turkestan. After completing a teacher preparation program, he started to teach at a contemporary school. In 1923, he was appointed the head of the curriculum department at an orphanage. During that time Gʻafur Gʻulom also started working on the editorial board of different publications, such as Kambagʻal dehqon (The Poor Farmer), Qizil Oʻzbekiston (Red Uzbekistan), and Sharq haqiqati (The Truth of the East). Working on editorial boards gave him a chance to learn about the life of ordinary citizens.

Gʻafur Gʻulom was also a supporter of the Jewish people, and promoted peaceful relations with them. During World War II he wrote a poem called "Men – Yahudiy" or "I'm a Jew".

Gʻulom died of illness at the age of sixty three on 10 July 1966, in Tashkent.

Archives show that he issued denunciations of other Uzbek writers to Soviet authorities. Unlike some of his counterparts who were also informants, he never showed any regret for the denunciations he issued.

== Works ==
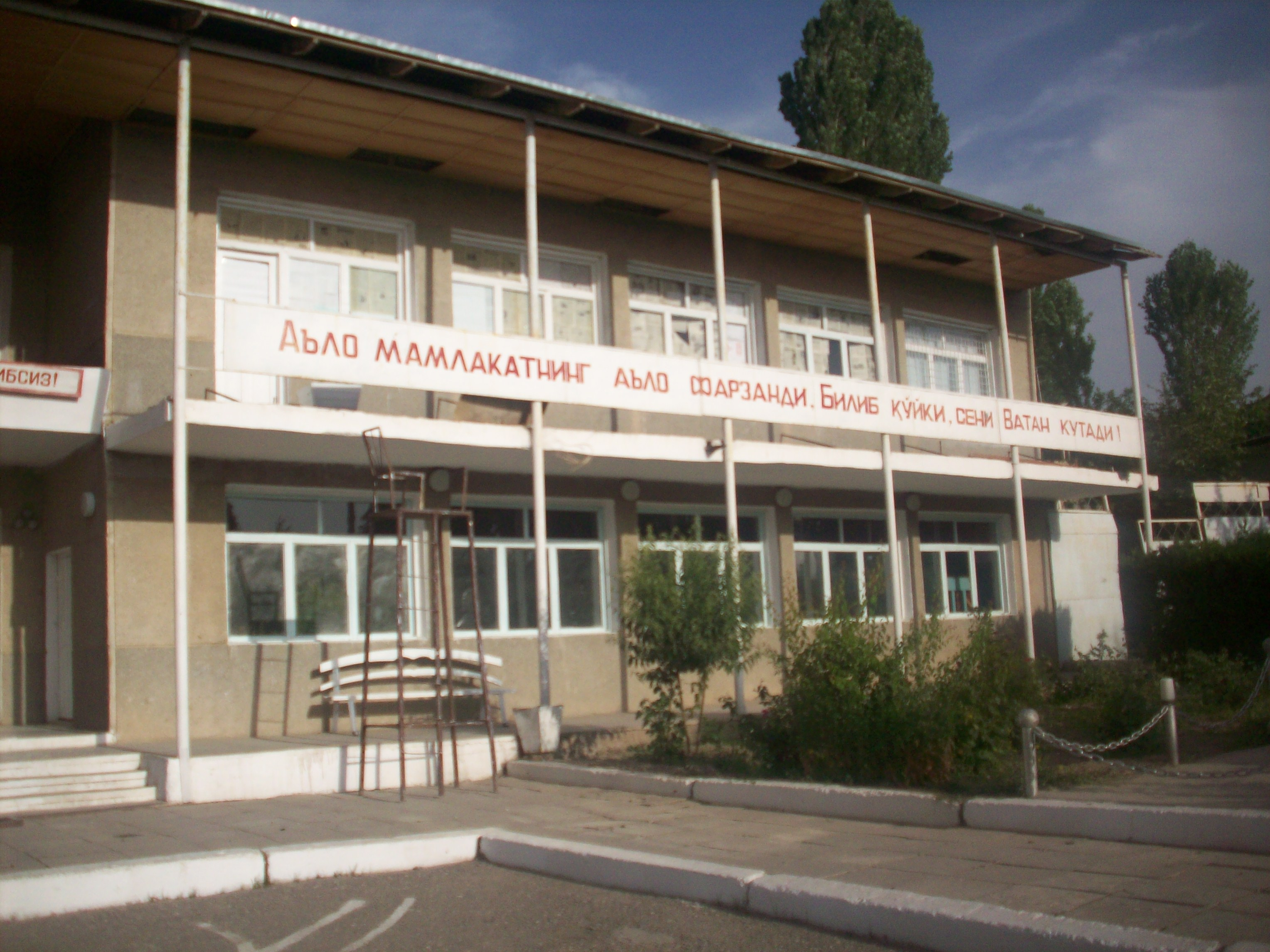
The building of the Uzbek Gymnasium in Isfana in 2008 with lines from a Gʻafur Gʻulom poem written at the front. The lines read: "Dear excellent child of an excellent state, know that your motherland awaits you."

Gʻafur Gʻulom's first poetry collections, Dinamo (Dynamo) and Tirik qoʻshiqlar (Alive Songs), were published in 1931 and 1932, respectively. In these books he criticized the unsophisticated traditions of the peoples of Turkestan and praised the diligent work of ordinary citizens. In the 1930s, in addition to numerous short stories, essays, and satirical articles, Gʻafur Gʻulom wrote many longer narratives, such as Netay (What Should I Do?), Yodgor, and Tirilgan murda (The Corpse that Came Alive).

During the Soviet-German war against Nazi Germany and its allies, Gʻafur Gʻulom devoted his time and efforts to writing about the war. His poems Sen yetim emassan (You're not an Orphan), Oltin medal (The Golden Medal), Kuzatish (Seeing off), Vaqt (Time), and Sogʻinish (Missing) became highly popular among Uzbeks.

In 1943, Gʻafur Gʻulom became a member of the Academy of Sciences of Uzbekistan. During the last 20 years of his life, he published almost twenty poetry books. Many of his works have been translated into other languages.

Gʻafur Gʻulom received many awards and honors throughout his life. He was awarded the Order of the Badge of Honour in 1944. For his compilation of poems about the Soviet-German war, Sharqdan kelayotirman (I'm Coming from the East), Gʻafur Gʻulom was awarded the State Stalin Prize in 1946. He received the Order of the Red Banner of Labour twice, in 1939 and 1963. He was also twice awarded the Order of Lenin. In 1970, he was posthumously awarded the Lenin Prize. In 2000, Gʻafur Gʻulom was posthumously awarded the National Order of Merit (Uzbek: Buyuk xizmatlari uchun), one of independent Uzbekistan's the most prestigious medals.

== Awards ==
- Stalin Prize 1st class (1946)
- Lenin Prize (1970)
- People's Poet of the Uzbek SSR (9 May 1963)
- Order of Lenin (16 January 1950, 11 January 1957)
- Order of the Red Banner of Labor (31 January 1939, 6 December 1951, 9 May 1963)
- Order of the Badge of Honor (25 December 1944)
- Order of Outstanding Merit (25 August 2000)

== See also ==
- Shum bola
