= Nurkhon Yuldashkhojayeva =

Uzbek dancer and honor killing victim (1913–1929)

- Nurxon Yoʻldoshxoʻjayeva; Нурхон Йўлдошхўжаева
- Born: 1913; Margilan, Russian Turkestan (present-day Uzbekistan)
- Died: 1 July 1929 (aged 15-16); Margilan, Uzbek SSR, USSR
- Cause of death: Stabbed in an honor killing
- Monuments: Statue dedicated in 1960s but removed shortly after Uzbekistan gained independence
- Occupations: Dancer, actress
- Known for: Removing veil in public

Nurkhon Yuldashkhojayeva (Note: also anglicized as Nurkhon Yuldasheva) (Uzbek: Nurxon Yoʻldoshxoʻjayeva, Нурхон Йўлдошхўжаева; c. 1913– 1 July 1929) was one of the first Uzbek actresses and one of the first Uzbek women to dance onstage without a paranja. A rising star in Uzbek theater, her career was cut short in 1929 by an honor killing, and she became a symbol of women’s liberation and resistance to feudalism.

== Life ==
Nurkhon was born in 1913 to an Uzbek family in Margilan, in the Ferghana Valley region. Raised in a repressive and very religious environment, she began wearing the veil at a young age like other Uzbek girls of the time. However, she grew interested in theater, and in 1928 she ran away from home to join the theater troupe of Muhitdin Qoriyoqubov, which was based in Samarkand at the time. She was mentored by Usta Olim Komilov, and her colleagues there included the future People's Artist of the USSR Tamara Khanum and the future People’s Artist of Uzbekistan Gavhar Rahimova. Shortly after joining the group, on 8 March 1928, she and another dancer went onstage and publicly removed their face-veils in celebration of International Women's Day, defying the social positions that had been imposed on them. Throughout her life, she was often threatened by religious fanatics who were enraged that she defied social norms by taking off the veil and seeking an acting career.

== Murder ==
When the dance troupe visited her hometown of Margilan in summer 1929, she decided to visit her family. She showed her aunt the dances and songs that she had learned, after which her aunt told her that her brother Salixoʻja was looking for her. He was waiting for her with a knife, and stabbed her to death as soon as she appeared. When the police came, he immediately confessed to the crime. He admitted that the murder was premeditated, at the insistence of their father Yoʻldoshxoʻja Salimxoʻjaev, the ming-boshi (a local administrator), and mullah Kamal G'iasov, who made Salixoʻja swear on the Quran to kill her. The day after her death, a massive funeral was held in the public square. Thousands of people attended the memorial, and women threw off their face-veils in front of her coffin. Her father and brother were eventually tried and executed for their role in the murder, and the ming-boshi and mullah were exiled.

Her sister Begimkhan, who had joined the theater troupe with her, joined Nurkhon on their trip to Margilan. The plan was to kill her as well; however, she did not end up visiting her parents because she was sick with a fever. Begimkhan lived on to have a successful career as an actress at the Alisher Navoi opera and ballet theater.

A poem memorializing Nurkhon was published in the Uzbek newspaper "Yosh Leninchi" (Young Leninist) on 20 November 1938.

== Legacy ==
After her death she was honored by the authorities of the USSR as a courageous Soviet role model and martyr, similar to that of Tursunoy Saidazimova. A statue of Nurkhon was built and placed in Margilan in front of the House of Culture. Made by sculptor Valentin Klevantsov in 1967, her statue was taken down in 1993 shortly after the disestablishment of the Uzbek Soviet Socialist Republic in 1991; A monument to a young woman representing the struggle for feminine emancipation was considered immoral in post-Soviet Uzbekistan. In the city of Ferghana there is a cinema that still bears her name though, the "Nurkhon" cinema.

Nurkhon was the heroine of the Soviet musical play “Nurkhon” by Kamil Yashin popular throughout the mid 20th century. A poem memorializing Nurkhon Yuldashkhojayeva was published in the Uzbek newspaper “Yosh Leninchi” (Young Leninist) on 20 November 1938.

== See also ==
- Tursunoy Saidazimova
- Tamara Khanum
- Honor killing
- Emancipation of women
- Hujum
