= Khadicha Sulaimanova =

Soviet academic (1913–1965)

Khadicha Suleimanova
- Хадича Сулаймонова
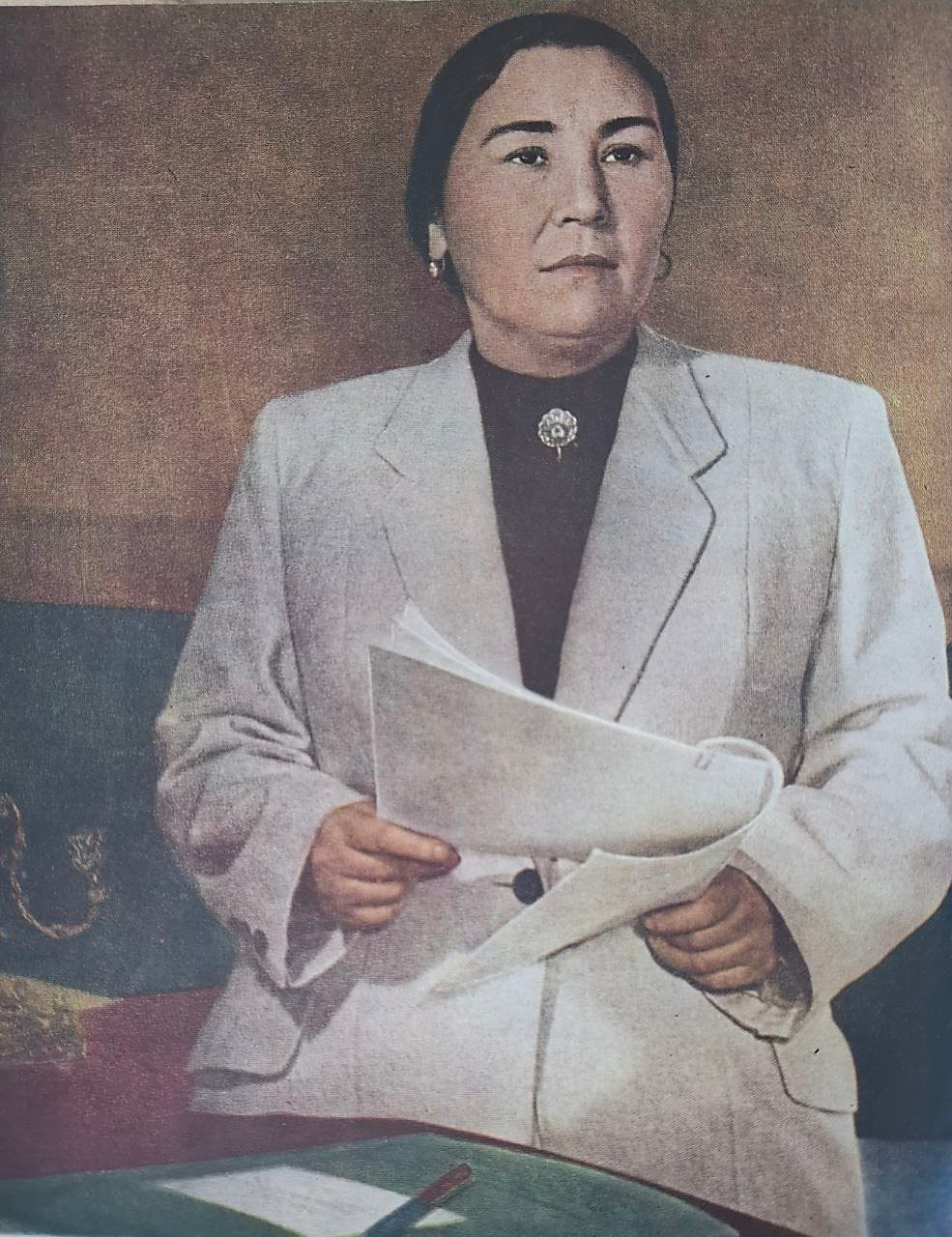
- Born: July 3, 1913; Andijan
- Died: November 26, 1965 (aged 52); Tashkent, Uzbek SSR, USSR
- Education: Doctor of Juridical Science, The Tashkent Institute of Soviet Construction and Law named after Jakhon Abidova
- Awards: Order of the Badge of Honour
- Scientific career
- Fields: Criminal law
- Workplaces: The Ministry of Justice of the Uzbek SSR, the Supreme Court of the Uzbek SSR.
- Thesis: The Emergence and Development of Soviet Criminal Law in Uzbekistan (1950)
- Academic advisors: Professor Aron Trainin
- Notable students: Malik Khakimov

Khadicha Suleymanovna Suleymanova (Russian: Хадича Сулаймоновна Сулаймонова: June 3, 1913 – November 26, 1965) was a Doctor of Juridical Sciences, professor, academician of the Academy of Sciences of the Uzbek SSR, Honored Scientist of the Uzbek SSR, minister of justice of the Uzbek SSR, and chairman of the Supreme Court of the Uzbek SSR.

== Early life and education ==
Khadicha Suleymanova was born in 1913 in Andijan. In 1935, she graduated from the Faculty of Law at the Tashkent Institute of Soviet Construction and Law named after Jakhon Abidova. From 1935 to 1938, she served as a people's judge and a member of the Supreme Court of the Uzbek SSR.

In September 1938, Suleymanova entered the postgraduate program at the Moscow Law Institute in the Department of Soviet Criminal Law. On July 20, 1945, after defending her dissertation on the topic "Criminal Legislation of the Uzbek SSR During the Period of Military Intervention and Civil War," she became the first Uzbek woman to earn an academic degree in the field of jurisprudence.

== Career ==
Starting in September 1945, Suleymanova became an associate professor and the head of the Department of Criminal Law at the Tashkent Law Institute. From 1948 to 1950, she was a doctoral candidate at the Institute of Law of the Academy of Sciences of the USSR. In December 1950, she defended her doctoral dissertation on the topic "The Emergence and Development of Soviet Criminal Law in Uzbekistan," and in 1952, she received the title of Professor.

In September 1954, Suleymanova was appointed as the rector of the Tashkent Law Institute, and in December of that same year, she was awarded the title of "Honored Scientist of the Uzbek SSR." In 1955, after the reorganization of the Tashkent Law Institute into the Faculty of Law at the First Central Asian State University (FCASU), she continued her work as dean while simultaneously serving as the head of the Department of Criminal Law. In 1956, Suleymanova was elected a full member of the Academy of Sciences of the Uzbek SSR.

From 1956 to 1958, Academician Suleymanova served as the minister of justice of the Uzbek SSR. From 1959 to 1964, she was the chair of the Legal Commission under the Council of Ministers of the Uzbek SSR and a deputy of the Supreme Soviet of the Uzbek SSR. Beginning in 1964, she held the position of chair of the Supreme Court of the Uzbek SSR.

=== Scientific and pedagogical career ===
Academician Khadicha Suleymanova was actively involved in scientific and pedagogical activities. Along with Academician Ibrohim Moʻminov of the Academy of Sciences of the Uzbek SSR, she worked on transforming the Department of Philosophy and Law at the Presidium of the Academy of Sciences of the Uzbek SSR into the Institute of Philosophy and Law of the Academy of Sciences of the Uzbek SSR (1958). She headed the Department of Law and its sections on criminal and civil law and procedure.

In her research, Suleymanova focused on the development of criminal law in Uzbekistan and the enhancement of the role of councils in state-building and managing the national economy. She authored over 80 scientific and popular publications, including major works such as "The History of Soviet State and Law in Uzbekistan" in three volumes, prepared in collaboration with Atabay Ishanov and other legal scholars from Uzbekistan, "Legal Issues of Regulating the National Economy of Uzbekistan," "Soviet Law in Uzbekistan During the Period of Advanced Construction of Communism," and others. Under the guidance of Suleymanovna, the first textbook on criminal law in the Uzbek language was prepared and published.

Under the scientific supervision of Academician Khadicha Suleymanova, 16 dissertations for the degree of Candidate of Sciences were prepared and defended. She provided scientific consultation for the preparation of doctoral dissertation of Malik Khakimov, the professor and Honored Scientist of the Uzbek SSR.

Suleymanova participated in the development of many legislative acts, notably including the preparation of the new "Regulation on the Advocacy of the Uzbek SSR" (1961). During her tenure as minister of justice and chair of the Legal Commission, she contributed to the development and adoption of new laws on the judiciary, as well as criminal, criminal procedural, civil, and civil procedural codes of the Uzbek SSR.

Suleymanova initiated the creation of the Scientific Research Institute of Forensic Expertise, based on the Tashkent Scientific Research Criminalistic Laboratory of the Ministry of Justice (1958).

=== International congresses and conferences ===
Sulaimanova was the vice-president of the Legal Section of the Union of Societies for Friendship and Cultural Relations with Foreign Countries and actively participated in the work of the Soviet Committee for Peace and the Committee of Soviet Women. She was a participant in the III International Sociological Congress (Amsterdam, 1956), the II UN Congress (London, 1960), the VII Congress of the International Association of Democratic Lawyers (IADL) (Sofia, 1960), the I Conference of Women from Asian and African Countries (Cairo, 1961), and the International Conference of Lawyers from Asia and Africa (Tokyo, 1961). She took part in a discussion on "Women in Modern Society and Paths to Their Liberation" (Prague, 1962) and, in January 1964, traveled to Ceylon (Sri Lanka) as the head of the delegation of the Soviet Committee of Women, upon invitation from the Lanka Mahila Samiti (LMS).

The government highly valued the state, scientific-pedagogical, and public contributions of Academician Khadicha Suleymanova. She was awarded the honorary title "Honored Scientist of the Uzbek SSR" (1954), received two Orders of the Badge of Honor, the medal "For Labor Valor During the Great Patriotic War," and honorary certificates from the Presidium of the Supreme Soviet of the Uzbek SSR.

== Death and legacy ==
She died on 26 November 1965, after a long and serious illness, and was buried at Chigatay Cemetery.

The name of Khadicha Suleymanova was given to the Scientific Research Institute of Forensic Expertise and one of the central streets in Tashkent.
