= Myrlaea orcella =

Scientific classification
- Kingdom: Animalia
- Phylum: Arthropoda
- Class: Insecta
- Order: Lepidoptera
- Family: Pyralidae
- Genus: Myrlaea
- Species: M. orcella

Binomial name
- Myrlaea orcella (Ragonot, 1887)

Synonyms
- Salebria orcella Ragonot, 1887

Species of moth

Myrlaea orcella is a species of snout moth in the genus Myrlaea. It was described by Émile Louis Ragonot in 1887 and is known from Uzbekistan (including Marghilan and Namangan).
