= Usta Olim Komilov =

- Born: 1875; Margilan, Russian Empire
- Died: 3 April 1953 (aged 77–78); Tashkent, Uzbek SSR, USSR
- Other name: Usta/Austa Alim Kamilov
- Occupations: Musician; choreographer
- Awards: Hero of Labour; Order of the Red Banner of Labour

Usta Olim Komilov (Note: sometimes anglicized as Usta Alim Kamilov or Austa Alim Kamilov) (1875 – 3 April 1953) was an Uzbek musician and choreographer who was instrumental in the development of the theater industry in the early days of the Uzbek SSR.

== Early life ==
Born in 1875 to a family of an impoverished weaver in Margilon, his parents wanted him to be educated. However, his family could not afford to send him to school, and after being orphaned by the death of his father when he was ten he became a day labourer, but later moved to Samarkand in hopes of a better life to live with his uncle, a wagon maker who kept him as an unpaid apprentice for over a decade. Interested in music, he started learning to play the tambourine and doira in his little free time. Eventually Komilov returned to Margilon to work as a craftsman, where he continued to improve his music skills and started teaching other Uzbeks to play the doira.

== Music career after the Russian revolution ==
After the Russian Revolution he participated in the organization of amateur music groups to play music for rallies and for the Red Army. By 1920, he worked solely in the music field, organizing music circles at teahouses, a boarding school in his hometown. From 1924 to 1926 he worked on selecting and organizing a group of 26 Uzbek musicians to train as music teachers to teach around the Uzbek SSR. In 1926 he began working for the Uzbek ethnographic troupe led by Muhitdin Qoriyoqubov, and in 1929 for the Uzbek Music and Dance troupe. Later he worked with Tamara Khanum to design and adapt dances to the songs he played. He played his music at many prestigious events including the National Theater Olympiad in Moscow in 1930 and the International Dance Festival in London in 1935, where he played music for Tamara Khanum's dance routine. Although the medals were intended to be awarded just for dances there, the Queen of England was so impressed with his musical performance that she had him awarded a gold medal. He met Langston Hughes while Hughes was touring the Uzbek SSR. He died in Tashkent on 3 April 1953.

== Honours ==
He became a People's Artist of the Uzbek SSR in 1937 and in 1932 he was awarded the title Hero of Labour, the predecessor to the title Hero of Socialist Labour. On 31 May 1937 he was awarded the Order of the Red Banner of Labour. In 1935, he was awarded a personal medal from the Queen of England for his musical performance at the International Folk Dance Festival in London. A streets in Tashkent and Margilon are named in his honor as well as a music school in Fergana.
