= Tursunoy Saidazimova =

Uzbek actress and honor killing victim (1911–1928)

- Born: c. 1911; Tashkent, Russian Turkestan, Russian Empire
- Died: 10 May 1928 (aged 16–17); Bukhara, Uzbek USSR, USSR
- Cause of death: Murdered by her husband in an honor killing
- Occupations: Actress, Singer
- Known for: Singing in theater without a face veil

Tursunoy Saidazimova (c. 1911 – 10 May 1928), occasionally transliterated as Tursunoi Saidazimova, was one of the first Uzbek actresses in the Uzbek SSR and one of the first to sing onstage without a face-veil. She was killed by her husband in an honor killing just shortly after her career took off.

== Music career ==
She met Hamza Niyazi in 1926 in Tashkent who befriended her and convinced her to join an opera. From 1925 to 1927 she studied theater at the Uzbek Drama Studio in Moscow and was a student of Niyazi. From 1927 until her death she was an actress of the Uzbek State Drama Union, where she introduced singing portions to many performances. Her fellow actresses dubbed her "the Uzbek Nightingale" for her beautiful voice and singing talent.

== Murder and martyrdom ==
She was killed by her husband upon pressure from his family for "dishonoring" them by performing without the veil in 1928 when she was only a teenager. Her death was widely mourned by the Uzbek theater community; Niyazi read the eulogy he wrote at her funeral causing several people to start crying in mourning. A poem Niyazi wrote commemorating her death called her a martyr for the arts; her murder was remembered even nearly a century later and efforts are still made to preserve her memory. Despite her colleague Nurkhon Yuldashkhojayeva suffering a murder under similar circumstances and facing damnatio memoriae, Saidazimova remained remembered and her name remains present in the Uzbek language theater media, partly due to the popularity of Niyazi's poem "Тursunoi Marsiyasi" that explained the story of her life as that of a martyr.

== See also ==
- Nurkhon Yuldashkhojayeva
- Tamara Khanum
- Hujum
- Honor killing
