= Jahon Obidova =

Uzbek politician (1900 – 1966)

- Born: 7 November 1900
- Died: 29 March 1966 (aged 65)
- Awards: Order of the Red Banner of Labour (2); Order of the Badge of Honour

Jahon Obidova (Uzbek Cyrillic: Жаҳон Обидова, Russian: Джахон Абидова, romanized Dzhakhon Abidova; 7 November 1900 – 29 March 1966) was a key figure in the Communist Party of the Uzbek SSR in the Hujum era, becoming the deputy chairman of the Central Executive Committee of the Uzbekistan SSR.

== Biography ==
Obidova was born on 7 November 1900 to an impoverished Tajik family. At the age of eleven (or twelve or thirteen according to other sources), she was sold to a wealthy man (Inagamdzhan Irmatov) to be his fourth wife to pay a fifteen-ruble debt of her father. He abused her, but after the revolution she left him and began going to school, initially working as a domestic servant, became a member of the Komsomol, and graduated in 1921. In 1927 she became a member of the Communist Party. She retired in 1961 as a personal pensioner and died on 29 March 1966. She was awarded two Order of the Red Banner of Labour and the Order of the Badge of Honour.

== Political work ==
Obidova was very active in politics of the Uzbek SSR in the 1920s and 30s, working in the zhenotdel as part of the campaign promoting the liberation of women and involvement of women in the Communist Party, in what became known as the hujum years. In 1921 she became a political instructor in the women's department of the Koshchi union in Tashkent. She was one of the first women in the region to remove her veil, having done it in 1923, and encouraged other women to stop wearing the burqa. In 1929 she was elected deputy chairman of the Central Executive Committee of the Uzbekistan SSR, in 1934 she became the chairman of the Tashkent City Council, and from 1935 to 1938 she served as the representative in Moscow of the government of the Uzbek SSR.

While it is unclear where Obidova was after being removed from her post in 1938 during the Great Purge, and although her pictures were removed from official publications and she was mentioned in the third Moscow Show Trial of 1938, she was not repressed for very long, as she was sent to work in agriculture management after the German invasion of the Soviet Union in 1941 and became the leader of various agricultural enterprises over the years.

== See also ==
- Tojikhon Shodieva
