= Tojikhon Shodieva =

Uzbek communist activist (1905–1981))

- Born: 26 October 1905; Yangichek, Margilon district, Russian Turkestan, Russian Empire
- Died: January 1981 (aged 75); Uzbek SSR, Soviet Union
- Citizenship: USSR
- Awards: Order of Lenin

Tojikhon Toshmatovna Shodieva (Uzbek: Тожихон Тошматовна Шодиева, romanized: Tojixon Toshmatovna Shodiyeva, Russian: Таджихан Ташматовна Шадыева, romanized: Tadzhikhan Tashmatovna Shadyyeva; 26 October 1905 – January 1981) was an Uzbek communist activist in the hujum. A victim of child marriage and one of the first as well as youngest women of Fergana to publicly remove her paranja, she rose to local prominence as a leader of women's liberation, becoming an active member of the Uzbek Communist Party and an editor of the Yangi Yo'l women's magazine.

However, because of her arrest in March 1938 during the Great Purge and subsequent imprisonment at Magadan labor camp, she fell into relative obscurity. Eventually, she was released and rehabilitated after the death of Stalin, resulting in her awards returned to her and her membership in the party reinstated. Later, she supervised the development of a collective farm that she became chairwoman of, and after her death it was named after her in her honor.

== Early life ==
Shodieva was born on 26 October 1905 in a family of a miner in Yangichek village, located in what in now Margilon. When she was only eleven her father Tashmat Mirzabaev, a miner, sold her for 200 rubles to a wealthy shaman from Kokand who had nine other wives. During the marriage she was heavily abused by him and his many other wives. After enduring the abuse for several years she was rescued in 1920 by the head of the women's department of the Fergana Regional Party Committee, who helped her leave the marriage and attend school.

== Political career ==
As a student of the party school, she joined the Komsomol, and after completing party school in 1921 she was sent to Khorzem to assist the women's department in the newly formed Khorezm People's Soviet Republic. In 1924 after completing training at the women's department of the Kokand city committee she became an instructor there; that year, having been invited to speak at the Komsomol Congress in Moscow at the Bolshoi theater, she braved removing her face-veil in public for the first time to stand at the podium and address the crowd. According to some accounts, she began to wear the veil again after returning to Kokand but stopped wearing it around 1924 to 1926; at about that time, she formally divorced her abusive husband as well, and eventually she married another party member. Ever since then, despite numerous death threats, she remained persistent in her fight for the emancipation of women in Central Asia. In January 1925 she became a full member of the Communist Party. After the formal start of the hujum in 1926 she was promoted to deputy head of the women's department of the Fergana Regional Committee to help kickoff the campaign, and later that year she moved on to deputy head of the women's department of the Central Committee of the Communist Party of Uzbek SSR, where she remained until March 1930. That year received her first state award, the Order of the Red Banner of Labor, and travelled to Moscow to attend a three-year course for executives; upon completion of it in 1933 she was assigned as head of the political department of a Machine tractor station. In addition, she became an editor of the Uzbek women's magazine Yangi Yo'l (New Woman) in November 1929, and in January 1930 she became a candidate member of the Secretariat of the Central Committee of the Communist Party of the Uzbek SSR. In March that year she became deputy head of the organization and instruction department of the party. In 1934 she was a member of the 17th Congress of the All-Union Communist Party; that year she received the Order of Lenin. From 1935 to 1937 she served in the 7th convocation of Central Executive Committee of the USSR. On 8 March 1937 she was elected first secretary of the Molotov District Party Committee.

=== Downfall ===
In 1937 at the height of the political repressions of the 1930s she and many of her colleagues were arrested. On 28 March 1938 she was initially sentenced to ten years in prison camps, but her sentence was prolonged and as result she endured nearly two decades in Kolyma prtison camps before she was released and rehabilitated in 1956.

== Later life ==
After her release and rehabilitation her awards were returned to her and she was reinstated into the party. Eventually she returned to the Uzbek SSR and founded a winery sovkoz named after Usman Yusupov in the Ferghana valley, which she became director of in 1958. In addition, she gave speeches to groups of komsomol members about the life before and after the hujum. Some time after she died in January 1981 the sovkoz she founded and directed was renamed in her honor, and several streets in the Uzbek SSR were named after her.

== Awards ==
- Order of Lenin
- Order of the October Revolution
- Two Order of the Red Banner of Labor
- Order of the Badge of Honor

== See also ==
Sayyora Rashidova
