= Muhitdin Qoriyoqubov =

Background information
- Born: 1 May 1896; Fergana, Uzbekistan
- Died: 2 February 1957 (aged 60); Tashkent, Uzbekistan
- Occupation(s): musician, theater artist
- Labels: Muslim Youth Dance Troupe
- Formerly of: Ethnographic Musical Ensemble of Uzbek SSR
- Partner: Hamza Hakimzade Niyazi

Muhitdin Qoriyoqubov (Note: sometimes anglicized as Mukhitdin Kari-Yakubov based on the Russian spelling Мухитдин Кари-Якубов) (Uzbek Cyrillic: Муҳитдин Қориёқубов; 1 May 1896 – 2 February 1957) was an Uzbek baritone singer and one of the first Uzbek folksingers. A co-founder of the Muslim Youth Dance Troupe along with Hamza Hakimzade Niyazi in 1918, he became a major player in the development of the early music and theater scene of the Uzbek SSR.

== Early life ==
Qoriyoqubov was born on 1 May 1896 in what is now Fergana to a working-class family. He attended religious schools, which he did not like. A lover of music since he was child, he sang in mosques and recited the Quran, but he did not engage in secular music until later on. In his youth he attended a religious school, which he hated as it discouraged his musical aspirations. However, he pursued a career in music and theater despite the disdain from religious authorities, and went on to organize a small orchestra in Skobelev in 1916. This was followed by the Muslim Youth Dance Troupe he founded with his friend Hamza Hakimzade Niyazi in 1918.

== Soviet era ==
He began his stage activity with the creation of the Fergana folk brass band in 1919, with which in 1919–1921 he performed in the Red Army units on the Turkestan Front. In the performances of the "Political Troupe" of H. Hamza performed as a dramatic actor. Participated in the organization of musical theaters in Tashkent, Andijan and Kokand. After the rise of Soviet power in Central Asia, music and dance groups received support from the state. Having become a member of the Communist Party in 1919, Qoriyuqubov went to study theater first in Tashkent in 1919 followed by attending the Theater Art Institute in Moscow from 1922 to 1924. He then worked on the development of music and theater in the Uzbek SSR, organizing the Ethnographic Musical Ensemble in 1925. The ensemble was a success, and began to attract talent from prominent artists from across the Uzbek SSR, from a variety of backgrounds, with Tamara Khanum joining as a dancer in 1926 and Usta Olim Komilov contributing music. In addition to organizing the group and recruiting musicians, Qoriyoqubov himself sang in performances. The troupe was devastated by the loss of Nurkhon Yuldashkhojayeva, who joined the troupe as a dancer but was murdered by her family in an honor killing in 1929, leaving the troupe in mourning. In November that year the ensemble was renamed the Uzbek State Musical Theater. Qoriyoqubov continued to work in the promotion and production of Uzbek music, collecting and writing down popular melodies. He also helped organize the Uzbek State Philharmonic Union, which he became the artistic director of in 1929—1939 and 1946—1950. Throughout his career he performed across the Soviet Union and internationally with his group, appearing in Moscow as well exhibitions in Paris and Berlin.

He was awarded the title People's Artist of the Uzbek SSR in 1936 and the Order of Outstanding Merit posthumously on 25 August 2000. In January 1957, as a result of an accident, he suffered a fracture of the femoral neck. He died two weeks later in Tashkent on 2 February 1957. He is buried in Tashkent at the Chigatoy cemetery. The Uzbek Philharmonic Society was named in his honor.

== Family ==
- Wife Tamara Khanum (real name Tamara Artemovna Petrosyan) (1906–1991) – dancer, singer, actress, choreographer, People's Artist of the USSR.
- Daughter Vanzetta Muhitdinovna Hanum is an artist.
- Son-in-law Tahir Salahov – painter.
- Granddaughter Aydan Salahova – painter and sculptor.

== Roles ==
- Sultanbek ("Arshin Mal Alan" by U. Hajibeyov);
- Hosrov ("Farhad and Shirin" by Uspensky and G. Mushel);
- Naufal ("Leyli and Majnun" by R. Glière in collaboration with T. Sodiqov);
- Ulugbek (Ulugbek by A. Kozlovsky);
- Mahmud Tarabi ("Mahmud Tarabi" by O. Chishko);
- Er Targin ("Yor Targyn" ("Courageous Targyn") by E. Brusilovsky);
- Governor-General ("Buran" by M. Ashrafi and S. Vasilenko).

== Awards ==
- Order of Outstanding Merit (25 August 2000) – posthumously
- Order of the Red Banner of Labour (31 May 1937)
- People's Artist of the Uzbek SSR (1936)
- People's singer of Turkestan
- various other medals

== Memory ==
M. Qoriyoqubov's name was given to the State Philharmonic of Uzbekistan.

The Academy of Folk Song and Dance and a street in Tashkent are named after Muhitdin Qoriyoqubov.

== Bibliography ==
- Nosirova, Halima (1962). Солнце над Востоком: записки актрисы. Литературная запись Наталии Пентюховой (in Russian). Молодая гвардия.
- "Умр китоби". Guliston (in Uzbek). 3: 24. 1985.
