= Myrlaea =

Scientific classification
- Domain: Eukaryota
- Kingdom: Animalia
- Phylum: Arthropoda
- Class: Insecta
- Order: Lepidoptera
- Family: Pyralidae
- Subfamily: Phycitinae
- Tribe: Phycitini
- Genus: Myrlaea; Ragonot, 1887

Genus of moths

Myrlaea is a genus of moths of the family Pyralidae described by Émile Louis Ragonot in 1887.

== Species ==
- Myrlaea albistrigata (Staudinger, 1881)
- Myrlaea dentilineella Ragonot, 1887
- Myrlaea serratella Ragonot, 1893
- Myrlaea orcella (Ragonot, 1887)
