= Tamara Khanum =

Uzbek dancer (1906–1991)

- Տամառա Պետրոսիան
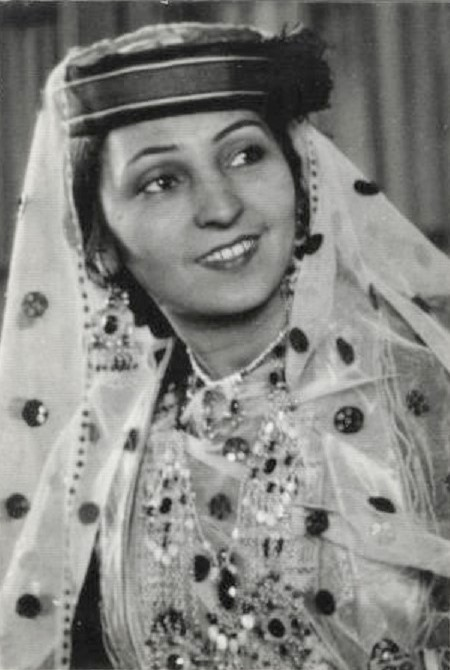
- Born: Tamara Artyemi Petrosyan; March 29, 1906; Novy Margilan, Fergana Oblast, Russian Empire
- Died: June 30, 1991 (aged 85); Tashkent, Uzbek SSR, Soviet Union
- Occupations: Dancer, choreographer, ballet instructor
- Awards: Stalin Prize; People's Artist of the USSR; Order of Lenin

Tamara Khanum (Note: Uzbek: Tamaraxonim; Armenian: Թամարա Խանում, romanized: Tʼamara Khanowm; Russian: Тамара Ханум, romanized: Tamara Khanum) (March 16, 1906 [O.S. March 29] – June 30, 1991, born Tamara Artyemi Petrosyan) (Note: Armenian: Թամարա Արտեմի Պետրոսյան, romanized: T’amara Artyemi Petrosyan; Russian: Тамара Артёмовна Петросян, romanized: Tamara Artyomovna Petrosyan) was an Uzbek-Soviet dancer, singer, actress, and choreographer. She was honored as a People's Artist of the USSR in 1956 and received the Stalin Prize, second degree, in 1941.

== Biography ==
Tamara Petrosyan was born on March 16 (29), 1906, in Margilan (modern day Fergana region in Uzbekistan) (according to other sources, in the village of the Gorchakovo railway station of the Margilan city council). She had Armenian descendants.

From 1919, Khanum performed as part of an Agi brigade under the leadership of Hamza Niyazi. In 1921-1922, she worked as an actress at the Tashkent Russian Opera and Ballet Theater named after Sverdlov. In 1922, she enrolled in the Tashkent Ballet Company and began dancing in semi-professional concert groups led by the first Uzbek artists Yatym Babadzhanov, Abrar Khidoyatov, and Ali Ibrahimov. In 1924, Khanum graduated from the Central Technical School of Theatrical Arts (CETETIS) (now GITIS) in Moscow.

From 1924 to 1928, Khanum was a soloist in the concert group of M. Kari-Yakubov (from 1926 - concert-ethnographic ensemble, from 1928 - musical-experimental ensemble). From 1925 to 1929, she performed in the musical-drama theaters of Samarkand, Kokand, and Andijan, where she played the roles of Shirin ("Farhad and Shirin" by Khurshid), Gulchehra ("Arshin mal alan" by U. Gadzhibekov), and Halima ("Halima" by G. Zafari). From 1929 to 1934, Khanum worked at the Samarkand Musical-Drama Theater (from 1931 - in Tashkent, reorganized into the Uzbek Musical-Drama Theater).

Tamara played a role in the development of the National Ballet Theater. From 1929 to 1934, she was a soloist and one of the organizers of the Uzbek Musical-Drama Theater in Samarkand (from 1931 - in Tashkent), established on the basis of the musical-experimental ensemble from 1939 - the Uzbek State Opera and Ballet Theater (now the Navoi Opera and Ballet Theater). She led the dance group at the theater. In 1933, Tamara participated in the organization of the ballet studio at the Uzbek Musical-Drama Theater (later - the Uzbek Republican Ballet School, from 1947 - the Uzbek Choreographic School, now the Tashkent State Higher School of National Dance and Choreography).

In 1934-1935, she was one of the organizers, ballet master, dancer, and pedagogical repetiteur of the Khorezm Regional Musical-Drama Theater (now named after Ogahi) in Urgench. In 1934, she played the role of Indra in the ballet "Ferengi" by B. K. Yanovsky. From 1936 to 1941, she was a soloist and choreographer at the Uzbek Philharmonic and the State Uzbek Opera and Ballet Theater. For forty-five days, she sang, danced, and worked as a builder on the Big Fergana Canal. As an elderly person, she traveled to Irkutsk to work on the construction of the Bratsk Hydroelectric Power Station.

From 1941 to 1969, Khanum was an organizer, artistic director, ballet master, and soloist of the musical ensemble of the Uzbek Philharmonic. She combined her artistic activities with extensive agitational work and took an active part in the movement for the emancipation of Muslim women. During the war years, she actively participated in front-line brigades, gave over 1000 concerts, received the Stalin Prize for her contribution to the defense fund, and donated funds for the construction of airplanes and tanks. In 1944, Khanum performed concerts for Central Asian workers mobilized to work in Chelyabinsk and Molotov regions. She was a member of the Communist Party (Bolshevik) from 1941. She was a deputy of the Supreme Soviet of the Uzbek SSR since 1937 and from 1948.

Khanum died on June 30, 1991, in Tashkent, and was buried in the Chigatai Cemetery.

=== Works ===
Khanum was a reformer of the Uzbek female dance style, and she extensively studied the folk songs and dances of various cultures worldwide. She created a genre known as the song-and-dance miniature. In her programs, "Songs and Dances of the Peoples of the USSR" and "Songs and Dances of the Peoples of the World," she performed more than 500 songs in 86 languages, along with choreographic compositions and dances from various cultures.

Her performing arts were known for the special expressiveness of her facial expressions and gestures referred to as "поющие руки". Among the dances she performed were Uzbek dances like "катаугон", "кари наво", "кешауюн", "пиля" and pila, as well as the Khorezm suite, including "дил хроук" and "садр" among others. She also played a role in creating the libretto for the first Uzbek ballet, "Gulandom," by E. G. Brusilovsky, and she performed in her own productions.

Khanum toured internationally, visiting countries such as France (1925), England (1935), Poland (1948), China (1953), Norway (1953), Indonesia (1957), Czechoslovakia (1959), Germany, Iran, Italy, Turkey, India, Mongolia, Pakistan, and more.

Khanum was among the first to showcase Uzbek art abroad at the World Exhibition of Decorative Arts (Paris, 1925). She also participated in the 1st World Festival of Folk Dance (London, 1935).

=== Family ===
Tamara Khanum's first husband was Mukhitdin Kari-Yakubov (1896-1957), with whom she had a daughter. He was a prominent theatrical figure and a baritone singer, achieving the title of People's Artist of the Uzbek SSR in 1936. Her second husband, Pulat Rahimov, was a composer. With him, she had a daughter named Lola.

== Awards and titles ==
Tamara Khanum received numerous honors and awards throughout her lifetime:

- People's Artist of the Uzbek SSR (1932)
- People's Artist of the USSR (28 May 1956)
- Stalin Prize, 2nd class (1941) - for her outstanding performance of Uzbek dances
- Order of Lenin (26 March 1976)
- Order of the Patriotic War, 2nd class (1985)
- Five Order of the Red Banner of Labor (31 May 1937, 16 January 1950, 6 December 1951, 18 March 1959, 17 February 1967)
- Order of the Badge of Honor (1939)
- Order of Outstanding Merit (Uzbekistan) (22 August 2001)
- Medal "For Distinguished Labour"
- Jubilee Medal "In Commemoration of the 100th Anniversary of the Birth of Vladimir Ilyich Lenin"
- Medal "For the Defence of the Caucasus" (1943)
- Medal "For the Victory over Germany in the Great Patriotic War 1941–1945" (1945)
- Jubilee Medal "Twenty Years of Victory in the Great Patriotic War 1941–1945"
- Jubilee Medal "Thirty Years of Victory in the Great Patriotic War 1941–1945"
- Jubilee Medal "Forty Years of Victory in the Great Patriotic War 1941–1945"
- Medal "For Valiant Labour in the Great Patriotic War 1941–1945" (1946)
- Medal "Veteran of Labor"
- Medal "50 Years of the Armed Forces of the USSR"
- Medal "60 Years of the Armed Forces of the USSR"
- Medal "70 Years of the Armed Forces of the USSR"
- Military rank of "Captain in the Soviet Army" (1943)

== Filmography ==
- 1962 - "Песни Тамары" (documentary) - main role
- 1964 - "Поёт Тамара Ханум" (documentary)

== Memory ==
In 1986, in Tashkent, a permanent exhibition of Tamara Khanum's costumes was opened in her house during her lifetime. In 1994, the Tamara Khanum Memorial Museum was established.

On March 29, 2006, Uzbekistan celebrated the centenary of Tamara Khanum in a festive and commemorative manner. This event recognized her significant contributions to the world of dance and culture.

== See also ==
- Hujum
- Nurkhon Yuldashkhojayeva
- Tursunoy Saidazimova
- Rano Yarasheva
