= Myrlaea dentilineella =

Scientific classification
- Kingdom: Animalia
- Phylum: Arthropoda
- Class: Insecta
- Order: Lepidoptera
- Family: Pyralidae
- Genus: Myrlaea
- Species: M. dentilineella

Binomial name
- Myrlaea dentilineella Ragonot, 1887

Species of moth

Myrlaea dentilineella is a species of snout moth in the genus Myrlaea. It was described by Émile Louis Ragonot in 1887 and is known from Turkey (including Malatia, the type location).
