= Myrlaea serratella =

Scientific classification
- Domain: Eukaryota
- Kingdom: Animalia
- Phylum: Arthropoda
- Class: Insecta
- Order: Lepidoptera
- Family: Pyralidae
- Genus: Myrlaea
- Species: M. serratella

Binomial name
- Myrlaea serratella Ragonot, 1893

Species of moth

Myrlaea serratella is a species of snout moth in the genus Myrlaea. It was described by Émile Louis Ragonot in 1893 and is known from Algeria (including Mardin, the type location).
