= Myrlaea albistrigata =

Scientific classification
- Kingdom: Animalia
- Phylum: Arthropoda
- Class: Insecta
- Order: Lepidoptera
- Family: Pyralidae
- Genus: Myrlaea
- Species: M. albistrigata

Binomial name
- Myrlaea albistrigata (Staudinger, 1881)

Synonyms
- Pempelia albistrigata Staudinger, 1881

Species of moth

Myrlaea albistrigata is a species of snout moth. It is found in France and Turkey.
