= Memorial house museum of Tamara Khanum =

- Established: 1994
- Location: Tashkent, Uzbekistan
- Type: Biographical museum

Memorial house museum of Tamara Khanum, is a museum in Tashkent, Uzbekistan devoted to Uzbek dancer of Armenian origin Tamara Khanum, opened in 1994 on the basis of a 1986 exhibition of costumes of the actress. The museum is situated in the center of Tashkent, near the metro station Hamid Alimdzhana on the street named after Tamara Khanum. In this house Tamara Khanum lived the last years of her life. The museum was opened while the actress was alive.

== History ==
Tamara Khanum's costume exhibition was opened in 1986, during her lifetime on the bases of which in 1994 the memorial museum of the actress was opened.

In 2008, a large-scale reconstruction of the museum was carried out at the expenses of the US Ambassador's Fund for the Preservation of Cultural Heritage. During the reconstruction 75 stage costumes were restored, a collection of historical photo materials was updated. There were recorded several audio-excursions, telling about the life and work of Tamara Khanum.

== Collections ==
The main part of the museum's exposition consists of numerous concert-stage costumes collected by Tamara Khanum during her tours, costumes presented to actress by Mao Zedong and Jawaharlal Nehru, national costumes of the peoples of Uzbekistan, Russia, Azerbaijan, Armenia, Egypt, India, Korea, China, Lithuania, Indonesia and many other countries, photographs from the 1920-1980s, manuscripts, posters, portraits of Tamara Khanum by Uzbek artists, unpublished memoirs of the actress, listen to Tamara Khanum's songs.

== See also ==
- List of music museums
