= Khonakhan Mosque =

Mosque in Margilan, Fergana, Uzbekistan

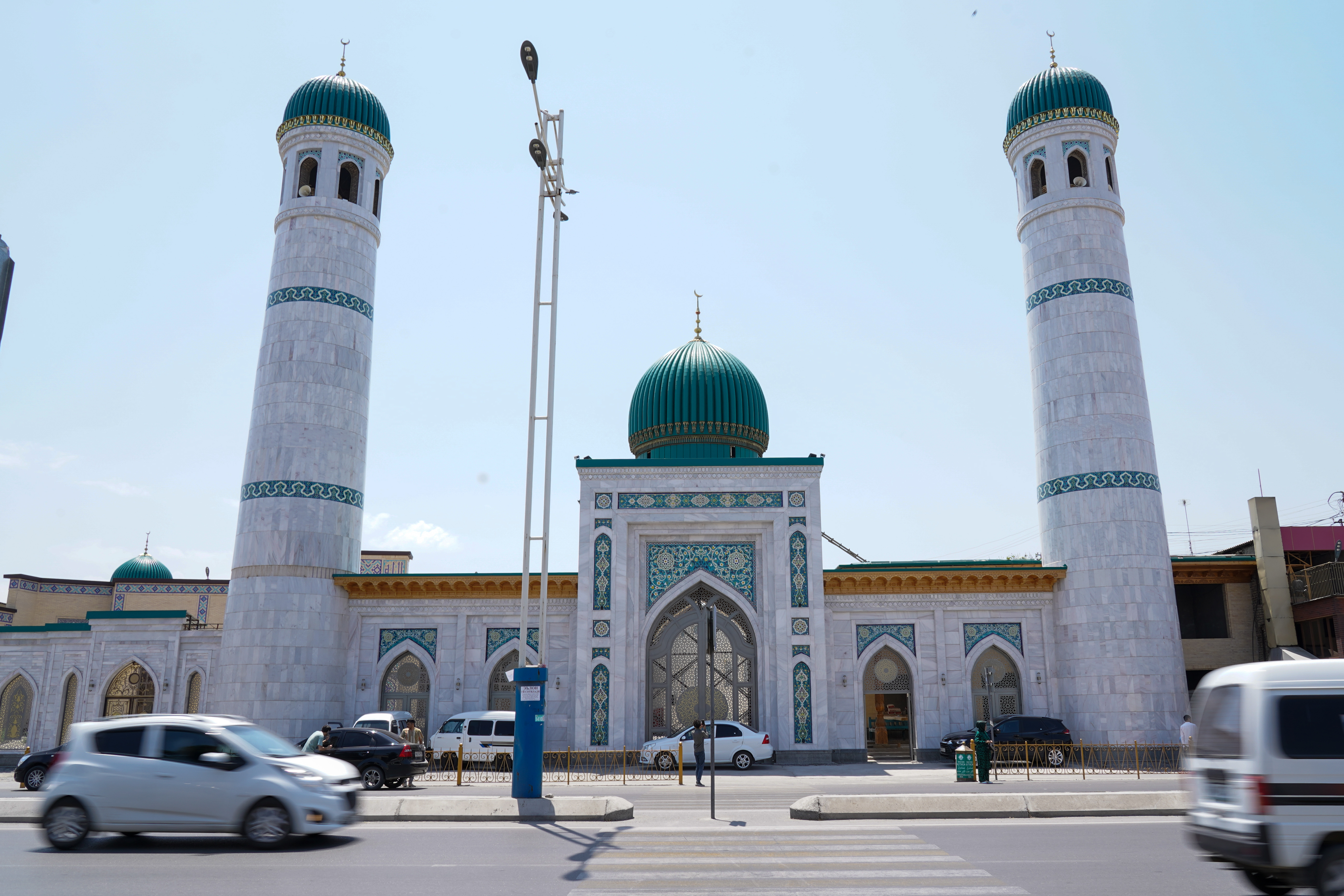

- Location within Uzbekistan

Religion
- Affiliation: Islam
- Branch/tradition: Sunni

Location
- Location: Margilan, Fergana, Uzbekistan
- Interactive map of Khonakhan Mosque
- Coordinates: 22°58′42″N 120°13′42″E

Architecture
- Type: mosque

Khonakhan Mosque is a mosque in Margilan, Fergana Region, Uzbekistan.

== History ==
The Khonakhan Mosque was built in the 16th century and was renovated in 2000s. It has two 26 meter high minarets, and the original carved wood pillars are still visible.

== See also ==
- Islam in Uzbekistan
