= Paranja =

Central Asian article of clothing

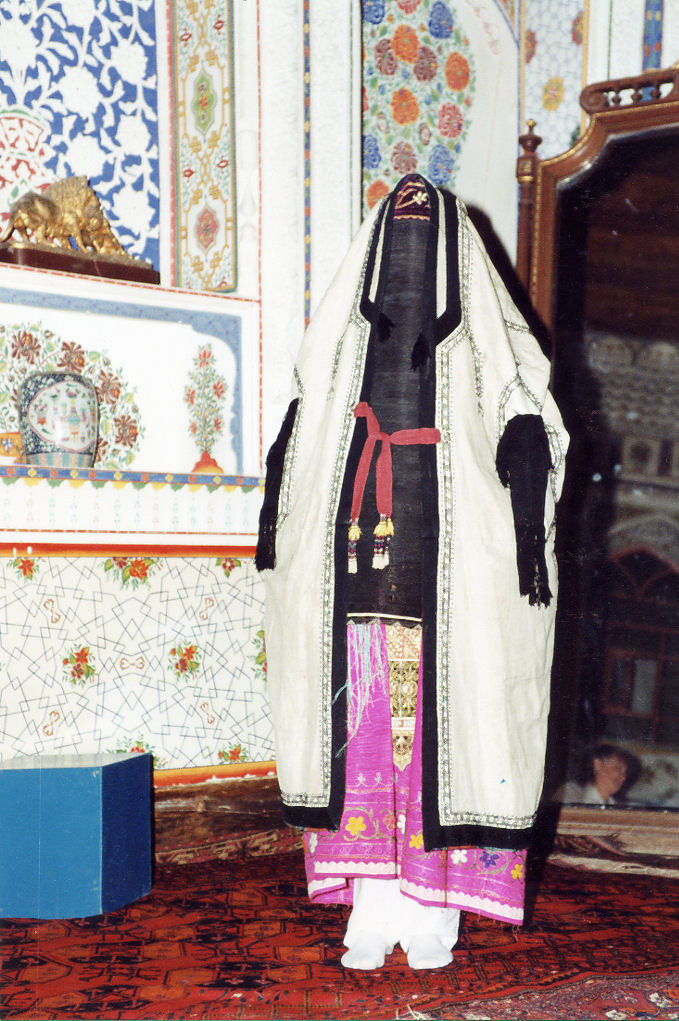
Uzbek paranja

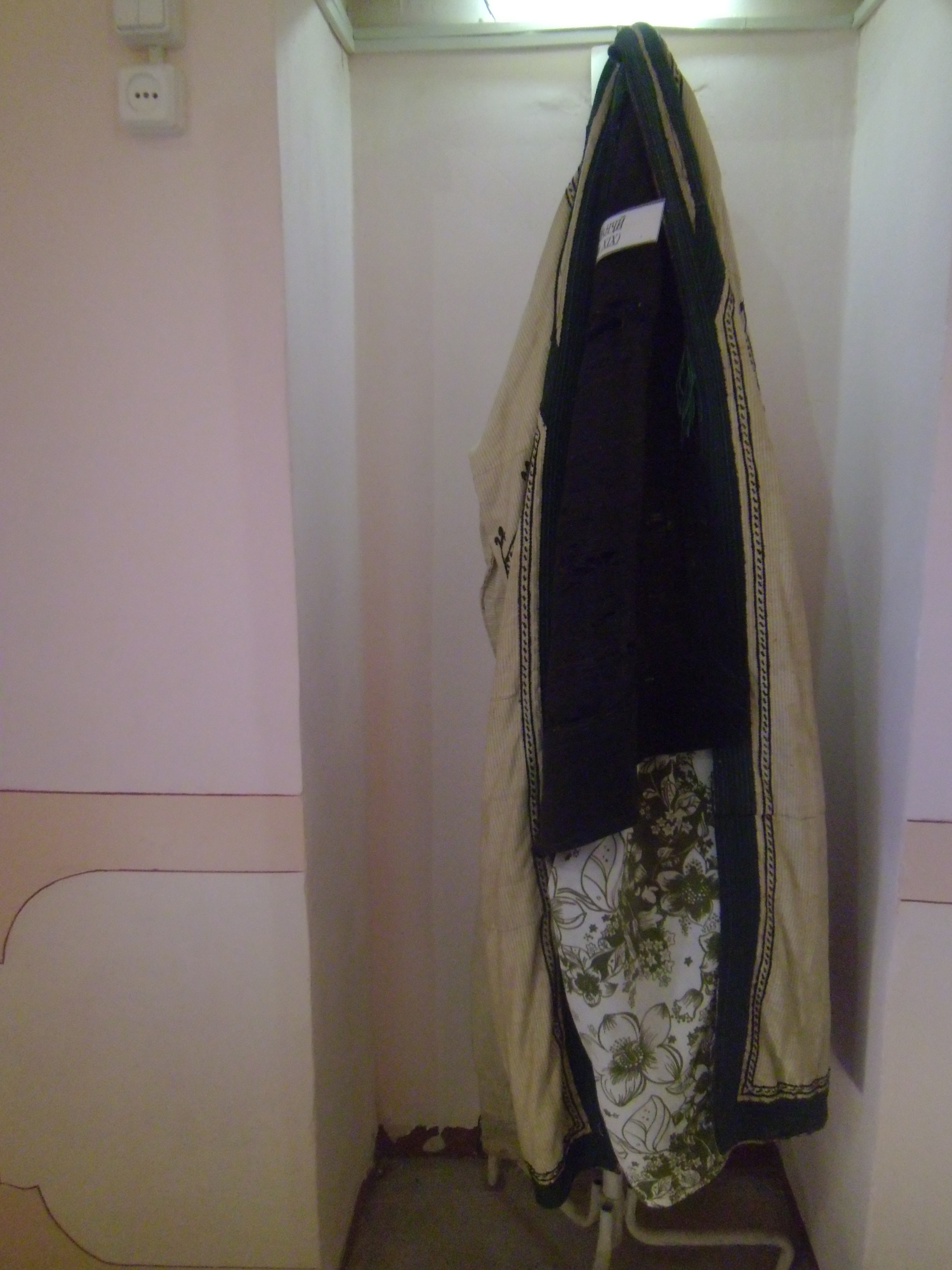
Tajik faranji on display in the Konibodom Museum of History and Geography

Paranja /ˈpærənˌdʒɑː/, paranji, or faranji (from Arabic: فرنجية, romanized: faranjiyyah; Tajik: فرنجی, фаранҷӣ, farançī; Uzbek: paranji; Russian: паранджа, romanized: parandzha) is a traditional Central Asian robe for women and girls that covers the head and body. It is also known as "burqa" in Arabic. It is similar in basic style and function to other regional styles such as the Afghan chadari. The part that covered the face, known as the chachvan (Uzbek: chachvon; Russian: чачван) or chashmband (Tajik: چشم‌بند, чашмбанд, caşmʙand), was heavy in weight and made from horsehair. It was especially prevalent among urban Uzbeks but was not commonly worn by people in the mountainous regions of Tajikistan. It was also worn during the Shaybanids' rule (c.1510–1600).

In the 1800s, Tajik and Uzbek Muslim women were required to wear paranja when outside their home. Paranji and chachvon were by 1917 common among urban Uzbek women of the southern river basins. This was less frequently worn in the rural areas, and scarcely at all on the nomadic steppe.

One historical account of the paranja is from Lord Curzon, who travelled to Bukhara in 1886. During his time there he never saw a woman between the ages of 10 and 50, for they were all concealed. The heavy black horsehair veils were "too bad and coarse for a seive", the women walking in loosely wrapped blue gowns with the empty sleeves pinned could have been "mistaken for clothes wandering about", and big leather boots covered their feet. Curzon noted that "Ladies of rank and good character never venture to show themselves in any public place or bazaar." He condemned this as a kind of tyranny, an exaggerated and erroneous notion of morality found everywhere in the East, but nowhere so striking as in Bukhara.

In the beginning of the Soviet Union under Lenin's leadership, following Russia's October Revolution which brought about state atheism, Soviet officials accepted the covered women since Muslims were seen as allies with early communists of Russia against the old regime and the Russian Orthodox Church. Later under Stalin, however, Soviets sought to discourage or ban the veil and the paranja. The unveiling by the Soviets was called the hujum in the Uzbek Soviet Socialist Republic (SSR). As the Soviet Communists secured their control of Central Asia, chachvans and paranjas were banned. The paranjas were burned on orders of the Communists, who upheld the doctrine of Marxist-Leninist atheism. In the 1920s, the government "brought gangs of militant young atheists to Central Asia who physically assaulted women, often tearing the veil from their faces in the streets of Tashkent, Samarkand, and other cities." However, some veil-wearing Muslim women responded by killing the women who were sent to take their veils off. Some Uzbeks violently opposed the anti-paranja campaign which was started by the Soviet Union.

Since the dissolution of the Soviet Union, Tajikistan President Emomali has claimed that veils were not part of Tajik culture. The veil was attacked by the government of Kyrgyz President Almazbek Atambayev. They are seldom worn now in Central Asia while most devout Muslim women prefer hijab or headscarf.

== See also ==
- Niqāb
- Burqa
- Types of hijab
- Hujum
