= Margilan =

Margilan Marg‘ilon / Марғилон
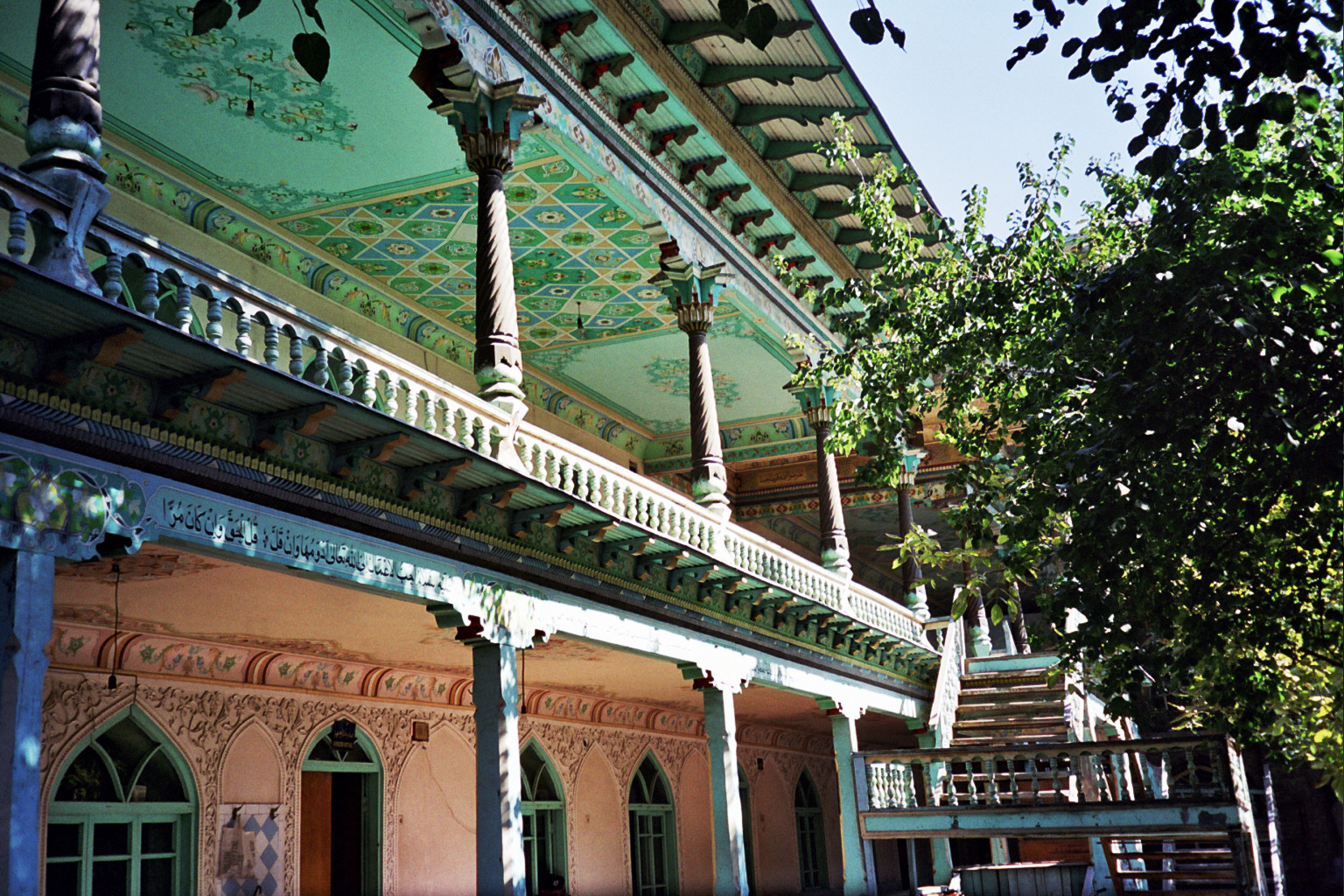
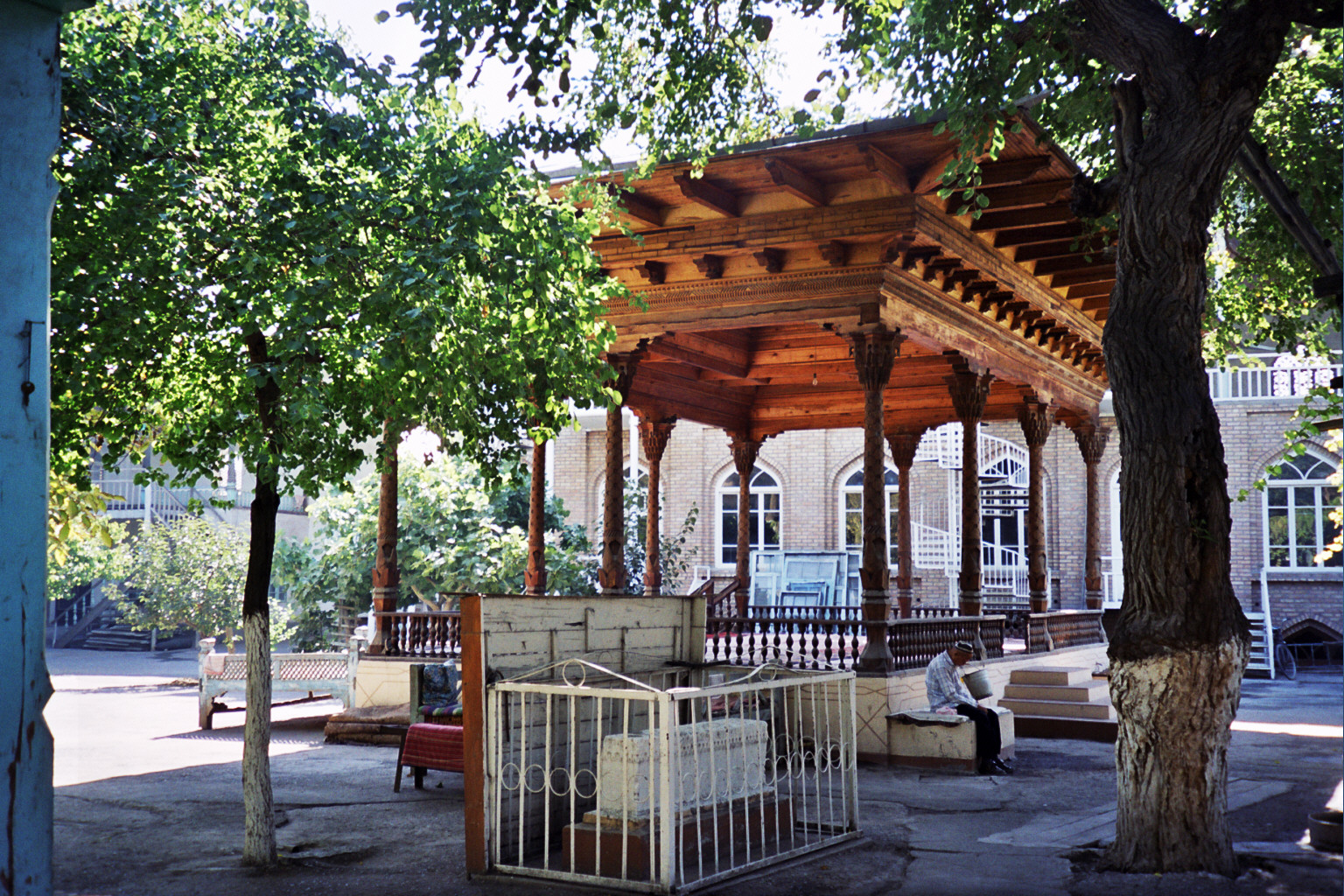
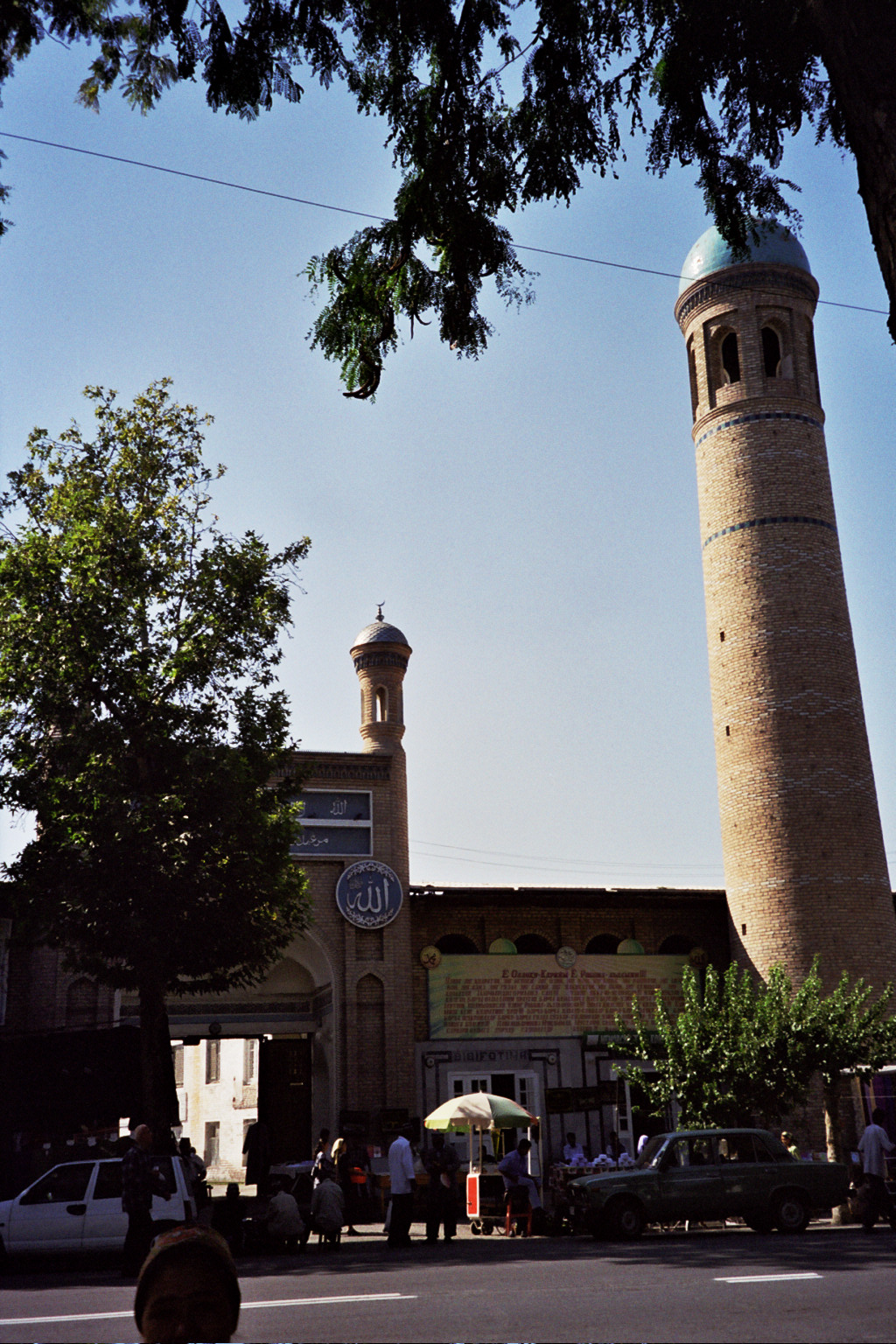
- Khonakhan Mosque and City Center aerial photo
- Interactive map of Margilan
- Location in Uzbekistan
- Coordinates: 40°28′16″N 71°43′29″E
- Country: Uzbekistan
- Region: Fergana Region

Area
  - Total: 40.83 km^{2} (15.76 sq mi)
- Elevation: 487 m (1,598 ft)

Population (2022)
  - Total: 242,500
  - Density: 5,939/km^{2} (15,380/sq mi)
- Postal code: 151100
- Area code: (+998) 73
- Website: www.margilon.uz

Margilan (Uzbek: Marg‘ilon, Persian: مرغیلان, pronounced [mɐrʁɨˈlɒn]) is a city in eastern Uzbekistan's Fergana Region. As of the 2024 census, its population was 253,500.

Margilan is located in the south of the Fergana Valley, where trade caravans from China traveled westwards and vice versa during the days of the Silk Road. Margilan has been renowned for its silk goods as far back as the 10th century.

According to legend, Margilan was founded by Alexander the Great. While stopping for lunch there, he was given chicken (murgh; in Persian: مرغ) and bread (nan; in Persian: نان), from which the town took its name. More reliable records indicate that by the 9th century Margilan was an important stop on the Silk Road, along the route going across the Alay Mountains to Kashgar.

In the early 16th century Babur, the founder of the Mughal dynasty, mentioned that "the pomegranates and apricots are superb .... the game in Margilan is good; white deer may be found nearby. The people are Sarts. They are a feisty people, ready with their fists. The custom of exorcism is widespread throughout Transoxiana, and most of the renowned exorcists of Samarkand and Bukhara are Margilanis. The author of the Hidaya (Burhan al-Din al-Marghinani) was from a Margilan village called Rishtan". This reputation for toughness extends to modern times. Margilan merchants were key players in Central Asian commerce, and were said to be a law unto themselves during Soviet days, when the city was the heart of Uzbekistan's black market. Margilan today is also a stronghold of conservative Islam, as is much of the Fergana Valley.

== History ==
=== In antiquity ===
There is a legend about the origin of the name of the city, associated with the invasion of Alexander the Great. Local residents, having learned of Alexander's intention to visit their city, prepared a red carpet for him. One of the elders of the town offered to welcome the guest with chicken and bread. After the feast, Alexander the Great asked what the dish was called. He was answered: "Murjinon", which means "chicken and bread". On his way back, he tasted the dish again and then called the place "Murjinon". Since then, the city has been named Margilan.

Margilan is one of the ancient cities of the Fergana Valley. In 1994-2004, employees of the Institute of Archaeology of Uzbekistan worked in the city, which revealed the existence of irrigated agriculture in Margilan oasis since no later than IV-III centuries BC.

The settlement appeared in the II-I centuries BC, when one of the roads of Silk Road passed through Fergana. In the sources the settlement is known from the 9th century. The name Margilan has been known since the 10th century.

It is reliably known that Alexander the Great was not in Fergana, and the extreme point of his expansion in Central Asia was the city of Khujand. Near or on its place he erected the fortress-city of Alexandria Eschate.

During World War II, in 1942, the 9th Infantry Division of the Polish Anders' Army was stationed and organized in Margilan, before it was evacuated from Uzbekistan to fight against Nazi Germany. There is a Polish military cemetery in Margilan.

== Economy ==
Margilan has been a center for the production of silk fabrics since antiquity. There are souvenir factories "Yodgorlik" and "Fayzulodin" and the firm "Atlas". There are many craftsmen working at home. Uzbekistan's largest traditional silk factory, the Yodgorlik Silk Factory, is based in Margilan. It employs more than 2,000 workers and produces an annual output of 250,000 square meters of silk cloth. The neighboring Margilan Silk Factory employs 15,000 workers using modern machinery, and produces some 22 million square meters per year.

The economy of the city is concentrated mainly in a large wholesale bazaar and food market. The private sector is very well developed. Residents of the city are mainly engaged in buying and selling and handicrafts, many work in public establishment.

In the years of USSR in the city built a silk mill, art and sewing factory, repair-mechanical, tractor-repair, woodworking, iron foundry and dairy plants.

== Main sites ==
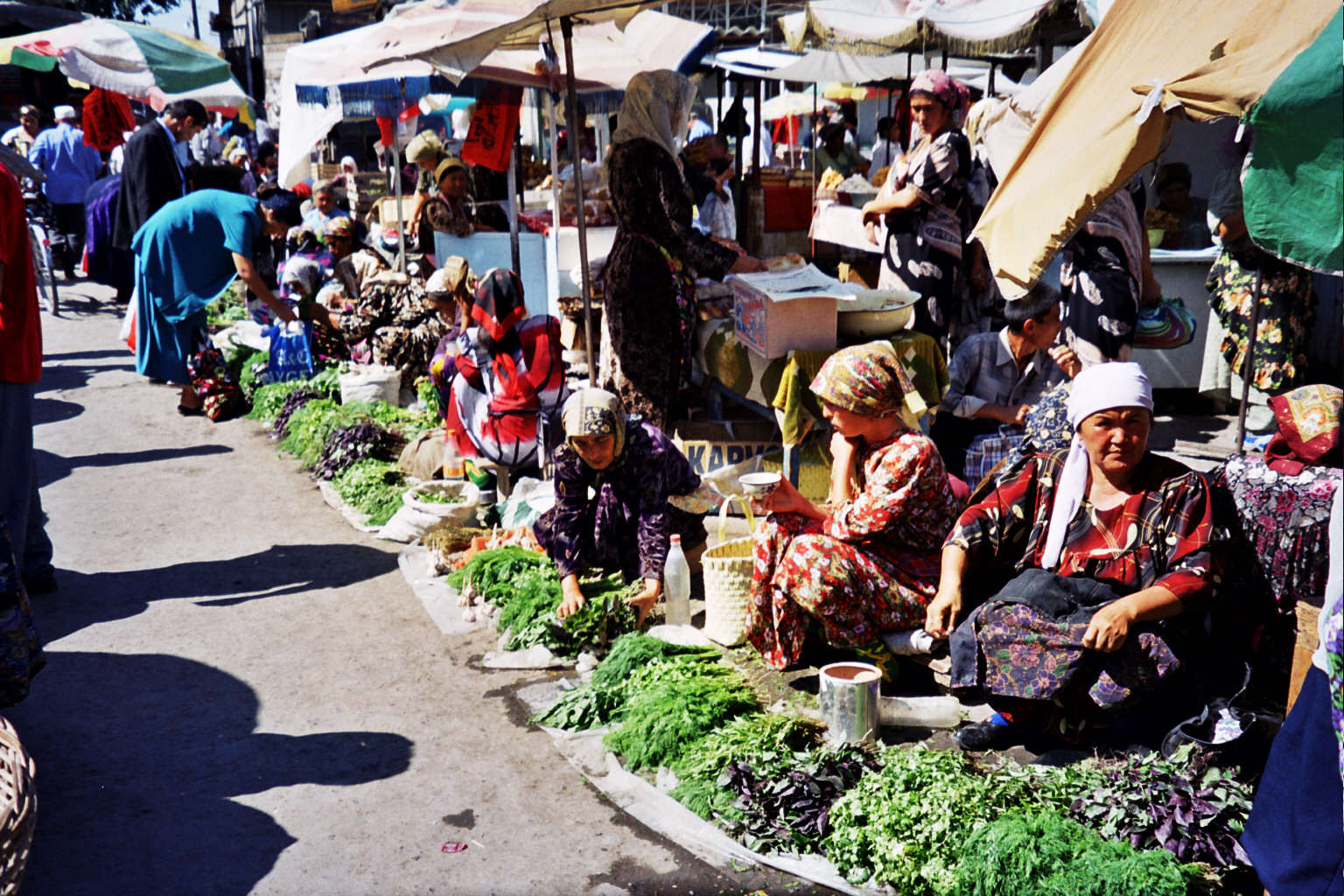
Marketplace

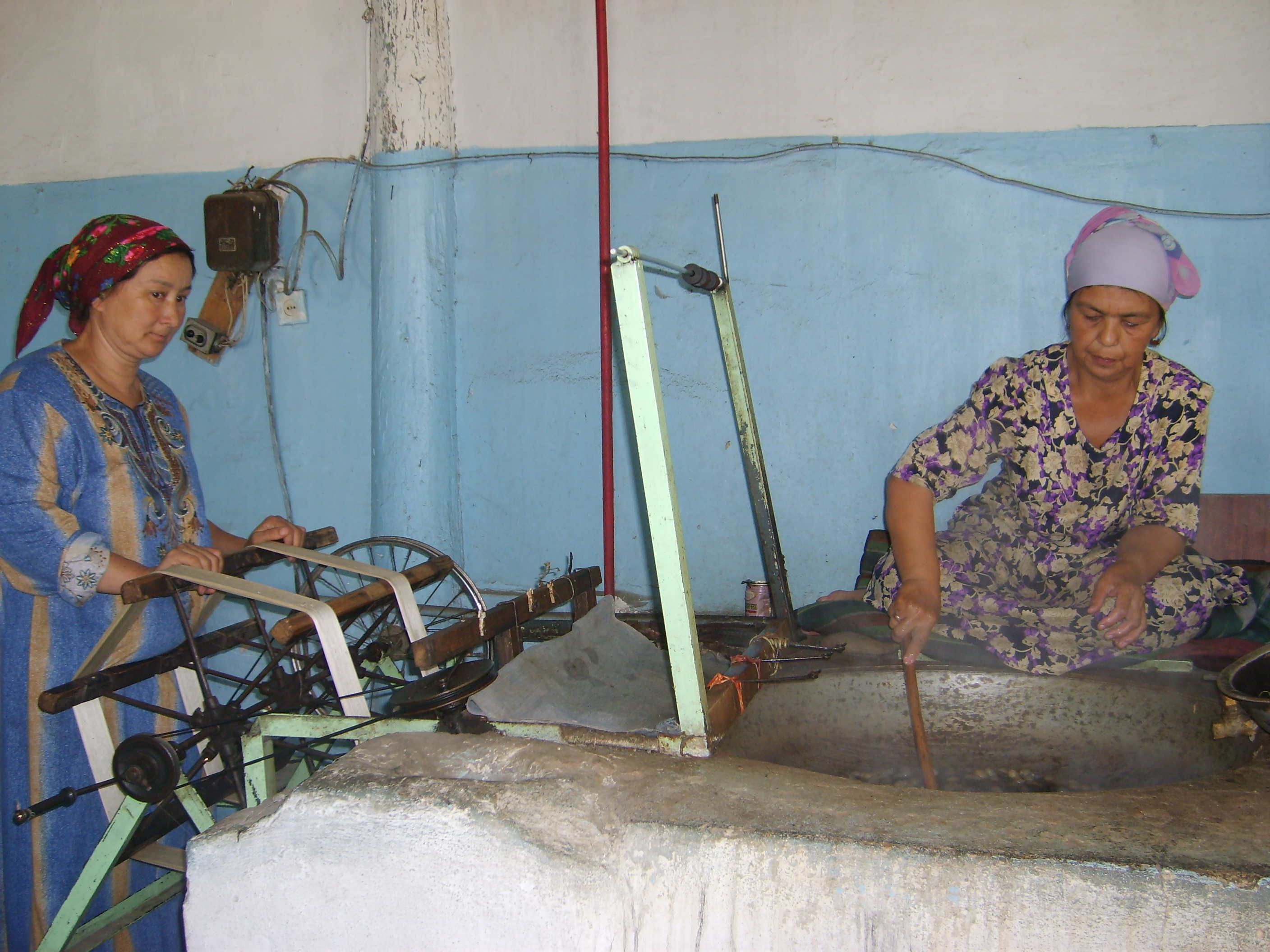
Silk production in a factory in Margilan, Fergana Valley, Uzbekistan

=== Yodgorlik Silk Factory ===
Established in 1983 in an attempt to preserve traditional silk weaving techniques in the face of industrialisation, the Yodgorlik Silk Factory focuses on producing high quality handmade goods. It employs over 200 workers, and the full production process takes place in the factory, from the feeding of silk worms with mulberry leaves, to dyeing the silks with natural mineral and vegetable dyes, to weaving the silk. The factory is open to the public for guided tours, enabling tourists to learn about Margilan’s traditional silk weaving industry.

=== Margilan Silk Factory ===
Margilan Silk Factory is a huge, state-run facility for industrial silk production. At its peak, it employed 15,000 workers, who produced up to 22 million square metres of silk each year. It is still possible to visit.

=== The Kumtepa Bazaar ===
The Kumtepa Bazaar is one of the most vibrant markets in Central Asia. It takes place on Sundays and Thursdays in a location 5 kilometers west of the city centre, and offers textiles, fresh produce, and household goods.

=== Toron Mosque ===
Toron Mosque is just north of Margilan's Central Bazaar. It was founded in the 19th century by Said Akhmad Khodjaev, a wealthy philanthropist and advisor to the tsarist administration who later fled to Margilan during the Bolshevik Revolution. In the 20th century, the building was used as a jail and then became an office. It now houses the Margilan Crafts Development Centre, which preserves traditional atlas and adras textile-making technologies.

=== Khonakhan Mosque ===
The Khonakhan Mosque (also known as the Khonaqoh Mosque) was built in the 16th century and has been renovated by the Ministry of Culture. The mosque has two impressive minarets, each 26 meters high, and original carved wooden pillars made from cedar by master craftsmen in Margilan.

== Geography ==
Margilan is located in the south-east of the Fergana Valley, in the foothills of the Alay Range, 9 km north-west of the regional center - the city of Fergana. There is a railway station on the Andijan - Kokand line.

== Population ==
Margilan is one of the three major cities of Fergana Region along with Fergana and Kokand. Representatives of more than 30 nationalities live in the city.

As of January 1, 2014, the population is 215,400 inhabitants.

Margelan, according to the general population census of the Russian Empire, conducted on January 28 (February 9), 1897 by direct survey of the entire population on the same date, in accordance with the "Regulations on the First General Population Census of the Russian Empire" approved by the Emperor of Russia in 1895, was one of the major cities of Central Asia.

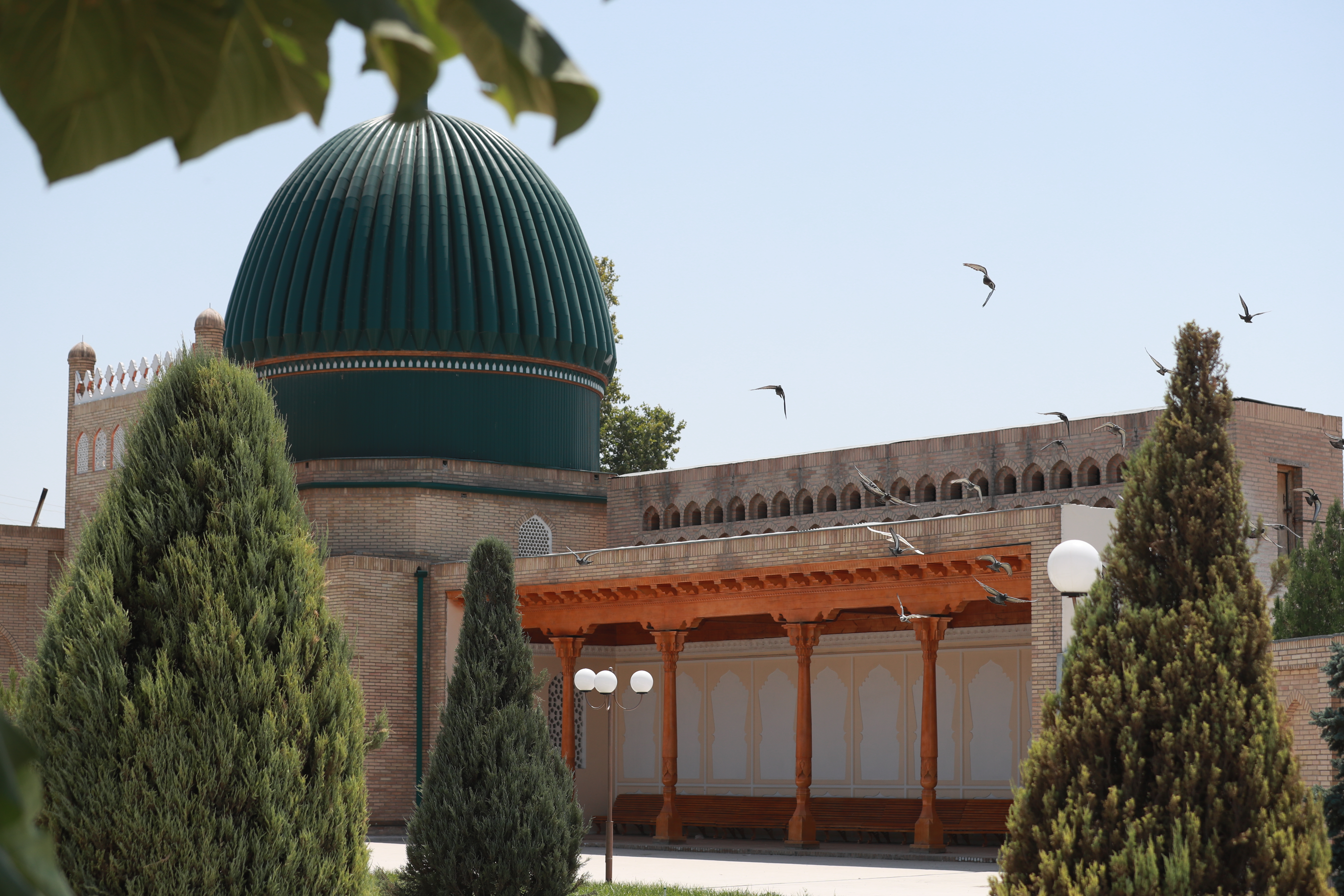
Pur Siddik in Margilan, Uzbekistan

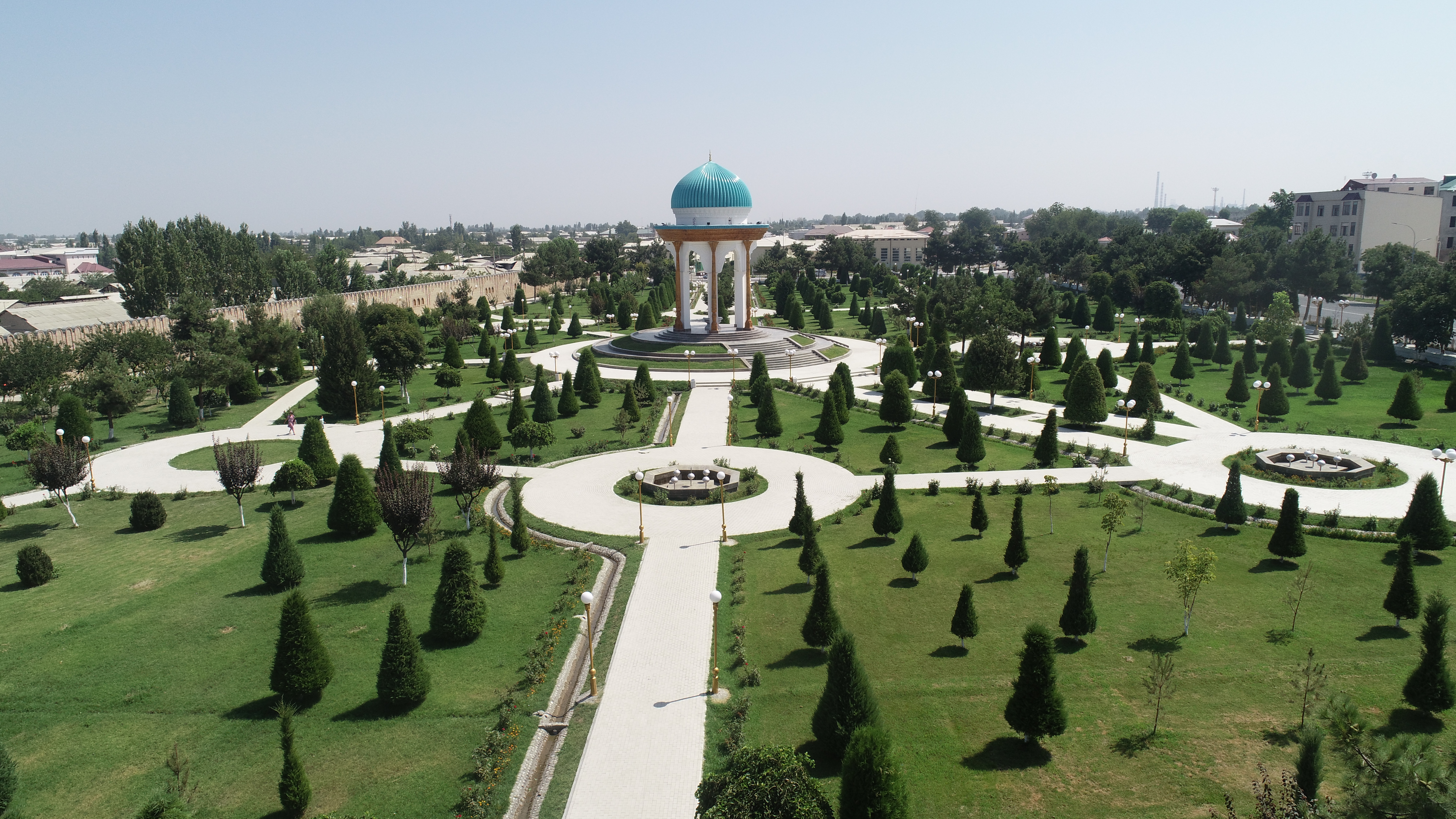
Margilan, Uzbekistan

== See also ==
- Nurkhon Yuldasheva
