= Issyk Kul Secondary School =

- Uzbek: „Issiqkoʻl“ oʻrta maktabi / Иссиқкўл ўрта мактаби Kyrgyz: «Ысыккөл» орто мектеби

Location
- Razzakov; Kyrgyzstan
- Coordinates: 39.8457°N 69.5446°E

Information
- School type: Elementary, secondary, and high school
- Established: 1999; 27 years ago
- Grades: 1-4 (Uzbek classes); 1-11 (Kyrgyz classes)
- Language: Kyrgyz and Uzbek
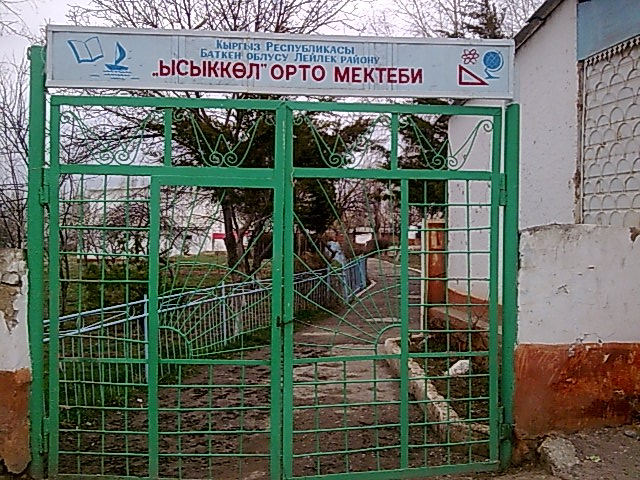
- The main entrance to Issyk Kul Secondary School

Issyk Kul Secondary School (Uzbek: „Issiqkoʻl“ oʻrta maktabi / Иссиқкўл ўрта мактаби; Kyrgyz: «Ысыккөл» орто мектеби) is a secondary school in Razzakov, Kyrgyzstan. Although the school is called a secondary school, it offers classes for grades one through eleven. The school has Uzbek and Kyrgyz classes.

The current building of Issyk Kul Secondary School was completed in 1982. The school was established in the 1990s as a branch of Alisher Navoiy Secondary School. In 1999, it became a separate institution. Issyk Kul Secondary School offers full eleven-year education to Kyrgyz students. However, Uzbek students can only attend elementary (grades 1-4) classes. Upon completion of elementary education, Uzbek students continue their studies at other schools in Razzakov, mainly at Alisher Navoiy Secondary School and the Uzbek Gymnasium.

== General framework and curriculum ==
At Issyk Kul Secondary School, children are accepted to first grade at the age of six or seven, depending on the child's individual development. The eleven-year school term is split into elementary (grades 1-4), middle (grades 5-9) and senior (grades 10-11) classes. Attending a "basic" nine-year (elementary and middle) program is compulsory. Grades 10-11 are optional. At Issyk Kul Secondary School, Uzbek students can only study until grade five. They have to continue their studies at other schools in the town. Kyrgyz students, on the other had, can complete all eleven grades.

As in many parts of the country, at Issyk Kul Secondary School children of elementary classes are normally separated from other classes within their own floor of the school building. They are taught, ideally, by a single teacher through all four elementary grades (except for physical education and foreign languages).

Starting from the fifth grade, each academic subject is taught by a dedicated specialty teacher. The school curriculum for senior students includes subjects like mathematics, informatics, physics, chemistry, geography, biology, arts, music, physical education, history, and astronomy.

Like many other schools in Kyrgyzstan, Issyk Kul Secondary School is a double shift school where two streams of students (morning shift and evening shift) share the same facility. The reason for this is that school capacity is insufficient to teach all of the students on a normal, morning-to-afternoon, schedule.

The school year extends from the beginning of September to the end of May and is divided into four terms. The school curriculum at Issyk Kul Secondary School is fixed: unlike in some Western countries, schoolchildren cannot choose what subjects to study. Students are graded on a five-step scale, ranging in practice from 2 ("unacceptable") to 5 ("excellent"); 1 is a rarely used sign of extreme failure. Teachers regularly subdivide these grades (i.e. 4+, 5-) in daily use, but term and year results are graded strictly 2, 3, 4, or 5.

== Medium of instruction ==
There are Uzbek and Kyrgyz classes at the school. Like in many other Uzbek-language schools in Kyrgyzstan, the future of teaching in Uzbek remains uncertain at Issyk Kul Secondary School.

Following the 2010 South Kyrgyzstan ethnic clashes, Kyrgyz authorities started to take measures to remove the Uzbek language from public life and to forcibly switch Uzbek schools to Kyrgyz. As part of these efforts, the number of teaching hours allocated to Kyrgyz language and literature lessons at Uzbek schools was significantly increased at the expense of Uzbek language and literature lessons.

Currently there are not enough school textbooks in Uzbek and the Kyrgyz government is unwilling to provide them, claiming that it does not have enough funds. As Kyrgyz officials strongly oppose the use of textbooks printed in Uzbekistan, currently the majority of Uzbek schoolchildren in Kyrgyzstan, including the students of Issyk Kul Secondary School study in Uzbek using Kyrgyz textbooks.
