= Isfana Secondary School =

- Uzbek: „Isfana“ oʻrta maktabi / "Исфана" ўрта мактаби

Location
- Razzakov; Kyrgyzstan
- Coordinates: 39.8319°N 69.5297°E

Information
- School type: Elementary, secondary, and high school
- Established: 1936; 90 years ago
- Grades: 1-11
- Language: Uzbek
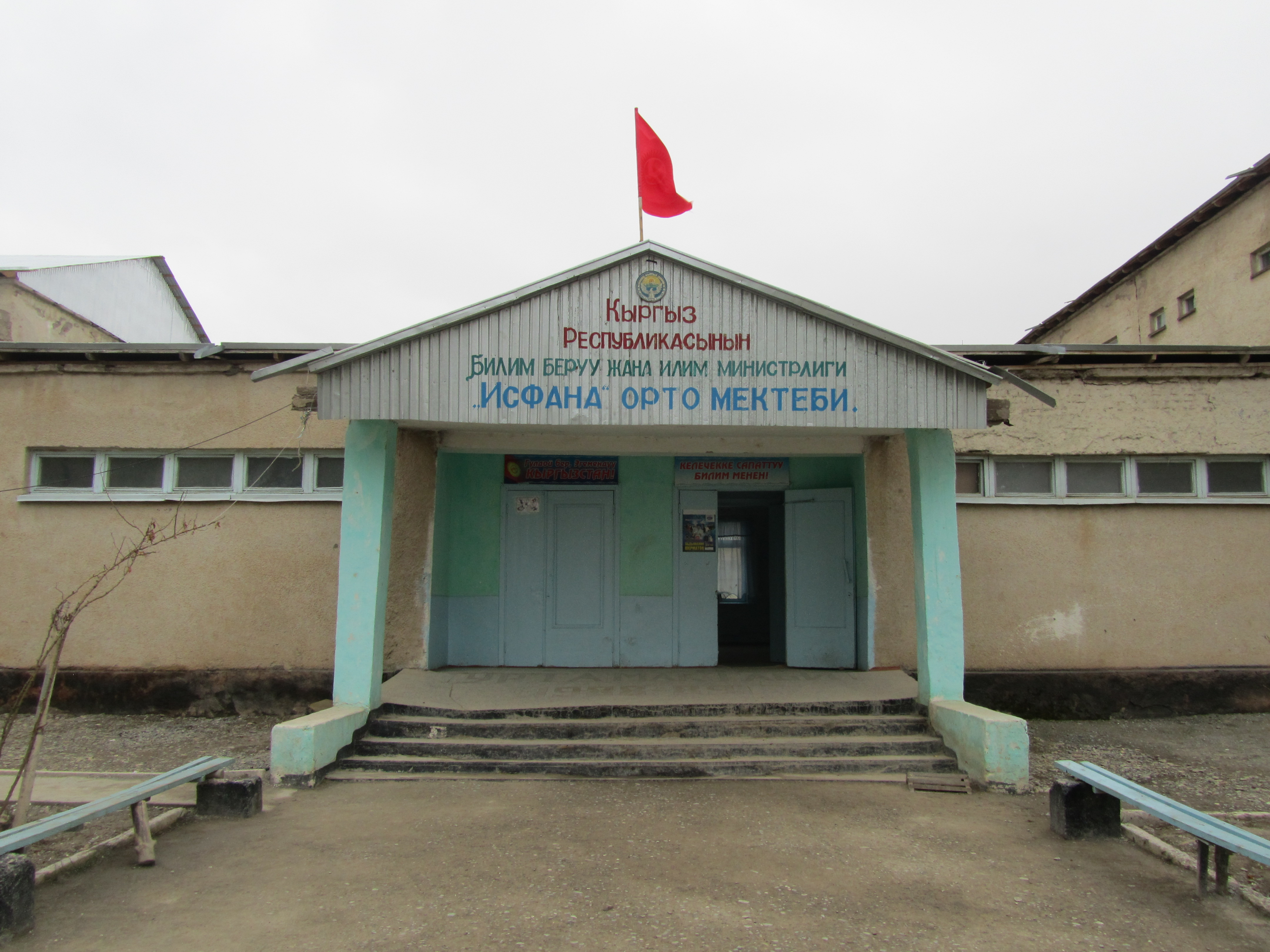
- The main entrance to Isfana Secondary School

Isfana Secondary School (Uzbek: „Isfana“ oʻrta maktabi / "Исфана" ўрта мактаби; Russian: Средняя школа «Исфана»; Kyrgyz: «Исфана» орто мектеби) is a secondary school in Isfana, Kyrgyzstan. Although the school is called a secondary school, it offers classes for grades one through eleven. The school courses are taught in Uzbek.

Isfana Secondary School was established in 1936. The school's first graduating class was in 1938. The school was initially located at the present-day site of Vocational School No. 48. Its current building was completed in 1989.

== History ==
In 1936, Budyonny Elementary School in Isfana was turned into Isfana Seven-Year School. In the USSR, seven-year schools were incomplete secondary general-education schools that originated in 1921 and existed until the 1950s.

In the 1930s, there were very few adequately trained instructors in Isfana. Several instructors from across Osh Region and the neighboring republics were sent to work initially at Budyonny and then Isfana School. The Ministry of Education of the Uzbek Soviet Socialist Republic (Uzbek SSR) sent instructors R. Tulamov from Bekabad in 1934 and O. Toʻqtasinov, Sh. Inoyatov, and K. Dundiyev from Tashkent in 1938 to teach at the school.

The school was initially located at the present-day site of Vocational School No. 48. The first building of the school was divided into three parts. One part was an orphanage. Another part was the office of Leilek District's public education authority. The remaining part of the building had classrooms where students attended classes. The orphanage was closed in 1949.

According to data collected in 1940, 322 students were being educated in 18 classes at the time. In 1960, Isfana School was turned into an eight-year school. In the USSR, eight-year schools were incomplete secondary general-education polytechnical schools that were oriented toward labor. From 1960 to 1969, Gʻulom Rajapov, Rizoqul Gʻaffarov, and Xosiyat Qunduzova served as principal of the school. In 1973, the school was transformed into a secondary school and the term of study was extended to ten years.

After the transformation of the school into a secondary school the following people served as principal: Ibrohim Xolmurzayev, Hurmatoy Gʻoynazarova (1986–1996), Dadajon Komilov (1996–2000), Mamlakat Uzoqova (2000–2003), Dadajon Komilov (2003–2010), Inomjon Roʻziboyev (2010–2016), and Davronbek Xudoynazarov (2016–present).

On 4 September 1999, Jumaboy Boboyev, a geography teacher, opened classes for perceptive students in Isfana Secondary School. These classes were later turned into a gymnasium school, namely the Uzbek Gymnasium.

== General framework and curriculum ==
At Isfana School, children are accepted to first grade at the age of six or seven, depending on the child's individual development. The eleven-year school term is split into elementary (grades 1-4), middle (grades 5-9) and senior (grades 10-11) classes. Attending a "basic" nine-year (elementary and middle) program is compulsory. Grades 10-11 are optional.

As in many parts of the country, at Isfana Secondary School children of elementary classes are normally separated from other classes within their own floor of the school building. They are taught, ideally, by a single teacher through all four elementary grades (except for physical education and foreign languages).

Starting from the fifth grade, each academic subject is taught by a dedicated specialty teacher. The school curriculum for senior students includes subjects like mathematics, informatics, physics, chemistry, geography, biology, arts, music, physical education, history, and astronomy.

Like many other schools in Kyrgyzstan, Isfana Secondary School is a double shift school where two streams of students (morning shift and evening shift) share the same facility. The reason for this is that school capacity is insufficient to teach all of the students on a normal, morning-to-afternoon, schedule.

The school year extends from the beginning of September to the end of May and is divided into four terms. The school curriculum at Isfana Secondary School is fixed: unlike in some Western countries, schoolchildren cannot choose what subjects to study. Students are graded on a five-step scale, ranging in practice from 2 ("unacceptable") to 5 ("excellent"); 1 is a rarely used sign of extreme failure. Teachers regularly subdivide these grades (i.e. 4+, 5-) in daily use, but term and year results are graded strictly 2, 3, 4, or 5.

== Medium of instruction ==
The medium of instruction at Isfana Secondary School is Uzbek. In addition to Uzbek, students also study three other languages, namely English, Kyrgyz, and Russian. Like in many other Uzbek-language schools in Kyrgyzstan, the future of teaching in Uzbek remains uncertain at Isfana Secondary School.

Following the 2010 South Kyrgyzstan ethnic clashes, Kyrgyz authorities started to take measures to remove the Uzbek language from public life and to forcibly switch Uzbek schools to Kyrgyz. As part of these efforts, the number of teaching hours allocated to Kyrgyz language and literature lessons at Uzbek schools was significantly increased at the expense of Uzbek language and literature lessons.

Currently there are not enough school textbooks in Uzbek and the Kyrgyz government is unwilling to provide them, claiming that it does not have enough funds. As Kyrgyz officials strongly oppose the use of textbooks printed in Uzbekistan, currently the majority of Uzbek schoolchildren in Kyrgyzstan, including the students of Isfana Secondary School study in Uzbek using Kyrgyz textbooks.

== Notable alumni ==
- Usmon Matkarimov (1922-1989) — graduated from Isfana secondary school in 1939; served as the head of Isfana's kolkhoz; greatly contributed to the development of Isfana and Leilek District; Usmon Matkarimov Gymnasium and Boarding School is named after him.
