= Uzbek Gymnasium =

- Uzbek: Oʻzbek gimnaziyasi / Ўзбек гимназияси

Location
- Razzakov; Kyrgyzstan
- Coordinates: 39.8330°N 69.5380°E

Information
- School type: gymnasium and boarding-school
- Established: September 4, 1999; 26 years ago
- Founder: Jumaboy Boboyev
- Headmaster: Sardor Toʻraqulov
- Grades: 5-11
- Language: Uzbek
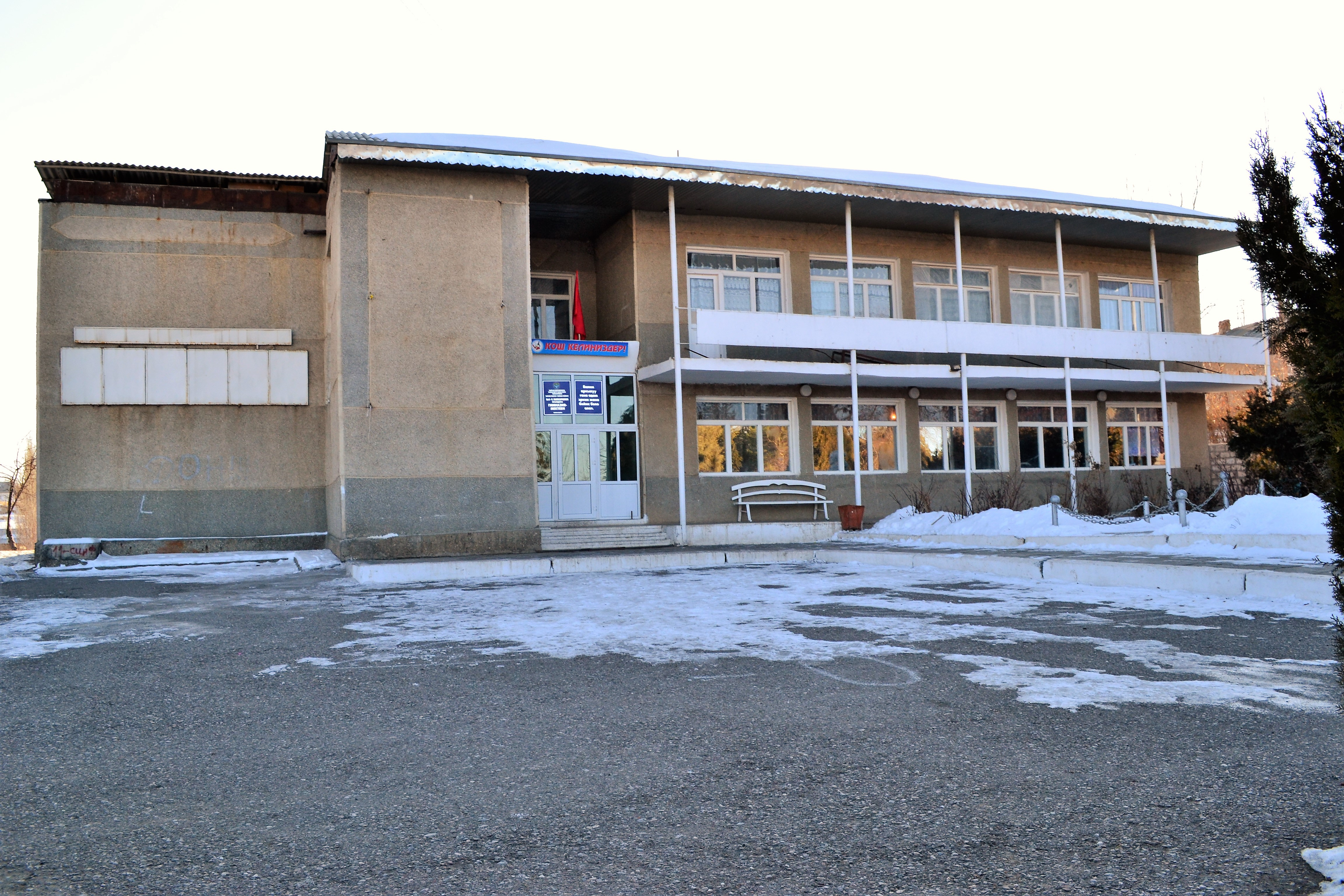
- The main building of the Uzbek Gymnasium

The Uzbek Gymnasium (Note: Uzbek: Oʻzbek gimnaziyasi / Ўзбек гимназияси; Russian: Узбекская гимназия; Kyrgyz: Өзбек гимназиясы) is a gymnasium and boarding school located in Razzakov, Kyrgyzstan. The official name of the school is U. Matkarimov Gymnasium and Boarding School. (Note: Uzbek: U. Matkarimov nomli gimnaziya-internat / У. Маткаримов номли гимназия-интернат; Russian: Гимназия-интернат имени У. Маткаримова; Kyrgyz: У. Маткаримов атындагы гимназия-интернат) In some documents it is written as U. Matkarimov Gymnasium and Secondary School. (Note: Uzbek: U. Matkarimov nomli gimnaziya-oʻrta maktab / У. Маткаримов номли гимназия-ўрта мактаб; Russian: Средняя школа-гимназия имени У. Маткаримова; Kyrgyz: У. Маткаримов атындагы гимназия-орто мектеп)

The school bears the name of Usmon Matkarimov who served as the head of Razzakov's kolkhoz for many years and made a significant contribution to the town's development. Since it is the fourth gymnasium to be established in Leilek District, the school is also known as Gymnasium No. 4.

Education is free at the Uzbek Gymnasium. Classes are offered for grades five through eleven. The school usually accepts more academically-inclined students. Some of the students, who mainly come from villages located in Leilek District, live in the school boarding house during the academic year.

== History ==
The Uzbek Gymnasium traces its origins to September 4, 1999, when Jumaboy Boboyev, a geography teacher, opened experimental classes for perceptive students in Isfana Secondary School. Mavluda Qoʻldosheva, a teacher of the Russian language, was appointed Head of the Teaching Department. A total of 67 students were selected and divided into four classes. Initially, only twelve instructors taught the students. Over the years, both the number of classes and the number of instructors have increased.

On January 20, 2000, the main office of Razzakov's kolkhoz was acquired to establish the Uzbek Gymnasium as a separate institution. The school has used the two-storey building, which was built in 1982, since that time. In 2000, the school was officially named after Usmon Matkarimov who served as the head of Razzakov's kolkhoz for many years and contributed significantly to the development of Razzakov and Leilek District. In May 2000, a bust of Matkarimov was erected in the school yard. That same year another school in Razzakov that bore his name, namely, Usmon Matkarimov Secondary School, was renamed Amir Temur Secondary School to avoid confusion.

Shokirjon Toʻychiev served as principal of the Uzbek Gymnasium from 2000 until 2010. He was succeeded by Habibullo Sattorov, who headed the school until 2014. Since 2014 Bumayram Xolmatova has served as principal of the Uzbek Gymnasium.

The following table lists the number of students and teachers for every academic year since the establishment of the school.

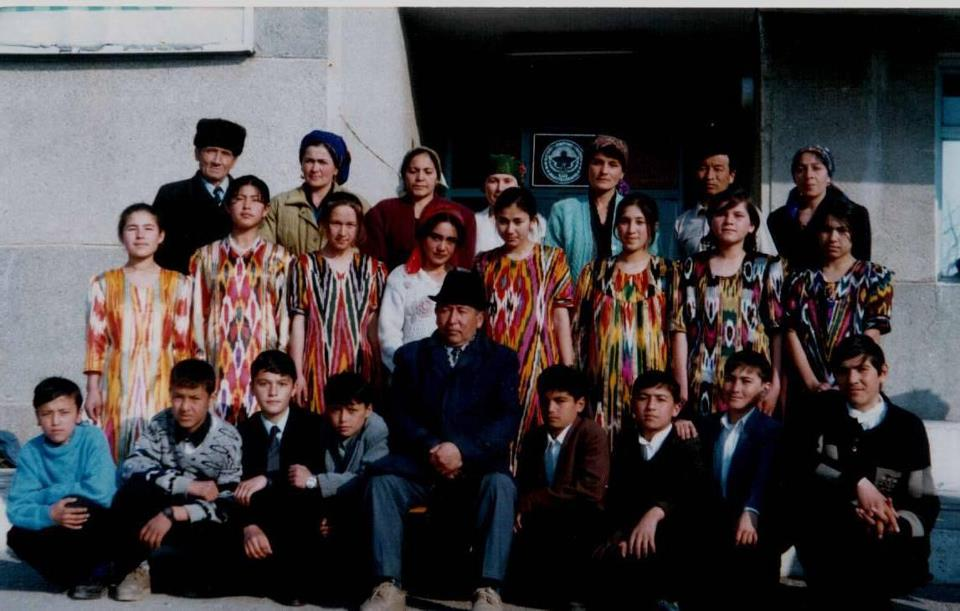
A group photograph of eighth-graders taken at Nowruz. This group of students became the first graduates of the Uzbek Gymnasium in 2003. Instructors: (back row, from left to right): Omonboy Umarov, Mavluda Qoʻldosheva, Omina Bozorova, Mohira Mahmadaminova, Malika Mirazizova, Gayipnazar Abdurasulov, Sanobar Hojiboboyeva; (the middle row, fourth from left) Nilufar Qosimova; (first row, fifth from left) Shokirjon Toʻychiyev.

Academic year	Students	Teachers
2001 - 2002	167	18
2002 - 2003	214	22
2003 - 2004	231	25
2004 - 2005	235	27
2005 - 2006	216	27
2006 - 2007	203	28
2007 - 2008	180	28
2008 - 2009	151	27
2009 - 2010	169	26
2010 - 2011	159	27
2011 - 2012	143	25
2012 - 2013	130	25
2013 - 2014	117	21
2014 - 2015	112	22

== Curriculum ==
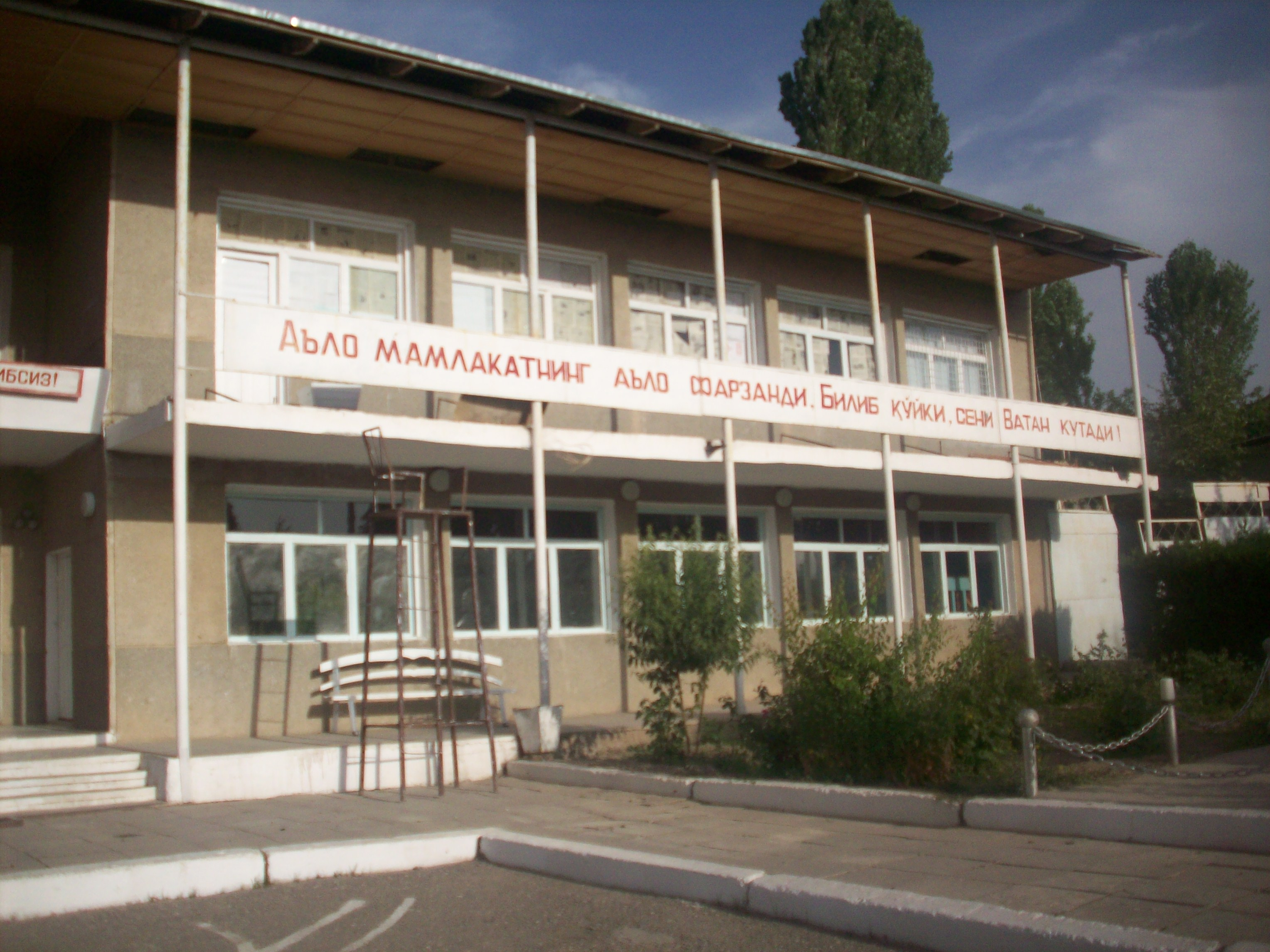
The school building with lines from a Gʻafur Gʻulom poem written at the front. The lines read "Dear excellent child of an excellent state, know that your motherland awaits you" in Uzbek. In 2008, the lines were erased following pressure from local Kyrgyz authorities.

The Uzbek Gymnasium accepts more academically-inclined students. Students must take entrance exams to enroll. While the Uzbek Gymnasium provides general education like other secondary schools in Razzakov, students of the gymnasium take more classes and have to study harder.

The school curriculum includes subjects like mathematics, informatics, physics, chemistry, geography, biology, arts, music, physical education, history, and astronomy. Students also learn Uzbek, Russian, English, and Kyrgyz.

At the Uzbek Gymnasium, the seven-year school term is split into middle (grades 5-9) and senior (grades 10-11) classes. Upon completing grade nine, students take state exams and get a certificate confirming their completion of the core nine-year program. Grades 10 and 11 are optional. Students take state exams once again when they finish grade eleven.

The school year extends from the beginning of September to the end of May and is divided into four terms. The school curriculum at the Uzbek Gymnasium is fixed: unlike in some Western countries, schoolchildren cannot choose what subjects to study. Students are graded on a five-step scale, ranging in practice from 2 ("unacceptable") to 5 ("excellent"); 1 is a rarely used sign of extreme failure. Teachers regularly subdivide these grades (i.e. 4+, 5-) in daily use, but term and year results are graded strictly 2, 3, 4, or 5.

Main classes are taught in the morning. In the afternoon, students must attend additional classes. One, two, or three additional classes are taught in the afternoon, depending on the grade. These classes are compulsory. Each class lasts for 45 minutes.

== Medium of instruction ==
The medium of instruction at the Uzbek Gymnasium is Uzbek. In addition to Uzbek, students also study three other languages, namely English, Kyrgyz, and Russian. Like in many other Uzbek-language schools in Kyrgyzstan, the future of teaching in Uzbek remains uncertain at the Uzbek Gymnasium.

Following the 2010 South Kyrgyzstan ethnic clashes, Kyrgyz authorities started to take measures to remove the Uzbek language from public life and to forcibly switch Uzbek schools to Kyrgyz. As part of these efforts, the number of teaching hours allocated to Kyrgyz language and literature lessons at Uzbek schools was significantly increased at the expense of Uzbek language and literature lessons.

Currently there are not enough school textbooks in Uzbek and the Kyrgyz government is unwilling to provide them, claiming that it does not have enough funds. As Kyrgyz officials strongly oppose the use of textbooks printed in Uzbekistan, currently the majority of Uzbek schoolchildren in Kyrgyzstan, including the students of the Uzbek Gymnasium study in Uzbek using Kyrgyz textbooks.

== School's performance on the National Scholarship Test ==
Since 2002 graduating students in Kyrgyzstan have been able to take the National Scholarship Test (NST), a standardized test for university admissions. The test is offered for high school graduates to compete for government-funded college scholarships. It is administered by the Centre for Education Assessment and Teaching Methods as well as the Ministry of Education and is funded by the United States Agency for International Development. Taking the test is not compulsory.

The test has two parts: main test and subject tests. Those taking the test must sit the main test. Students take the subject tests based on what programs they would like to apply for.

Since its first graduating class in 2003, students of the Uzbek Gymnasium have taken the NST. Students scoring above a certain benchmark (usually 200) receive a "golden certificate" and have a higher chance of getting a government-funded scholarship. To date no graduate student of the Uzbek Gymnasium has scored above 200. The highest NST score in the school's history was attained by Sarvinoz Abdullayeva who received a score of 198 in 2012.

Until 2013, the NST could be taken in Kyrgyz, Russian, and Uzbek. In the wake of the inter-ethnic clashes between the Kyrgyz and Uzbeks in southern Kyrgyzstan, some Kyrgyz politicians started to call for stopping offering the test in Uzbek. The Uzbek test was reported to have been discontinued in 2013. However, later that year this decision was reversed and Uzbek students were able to take the test in their native language.

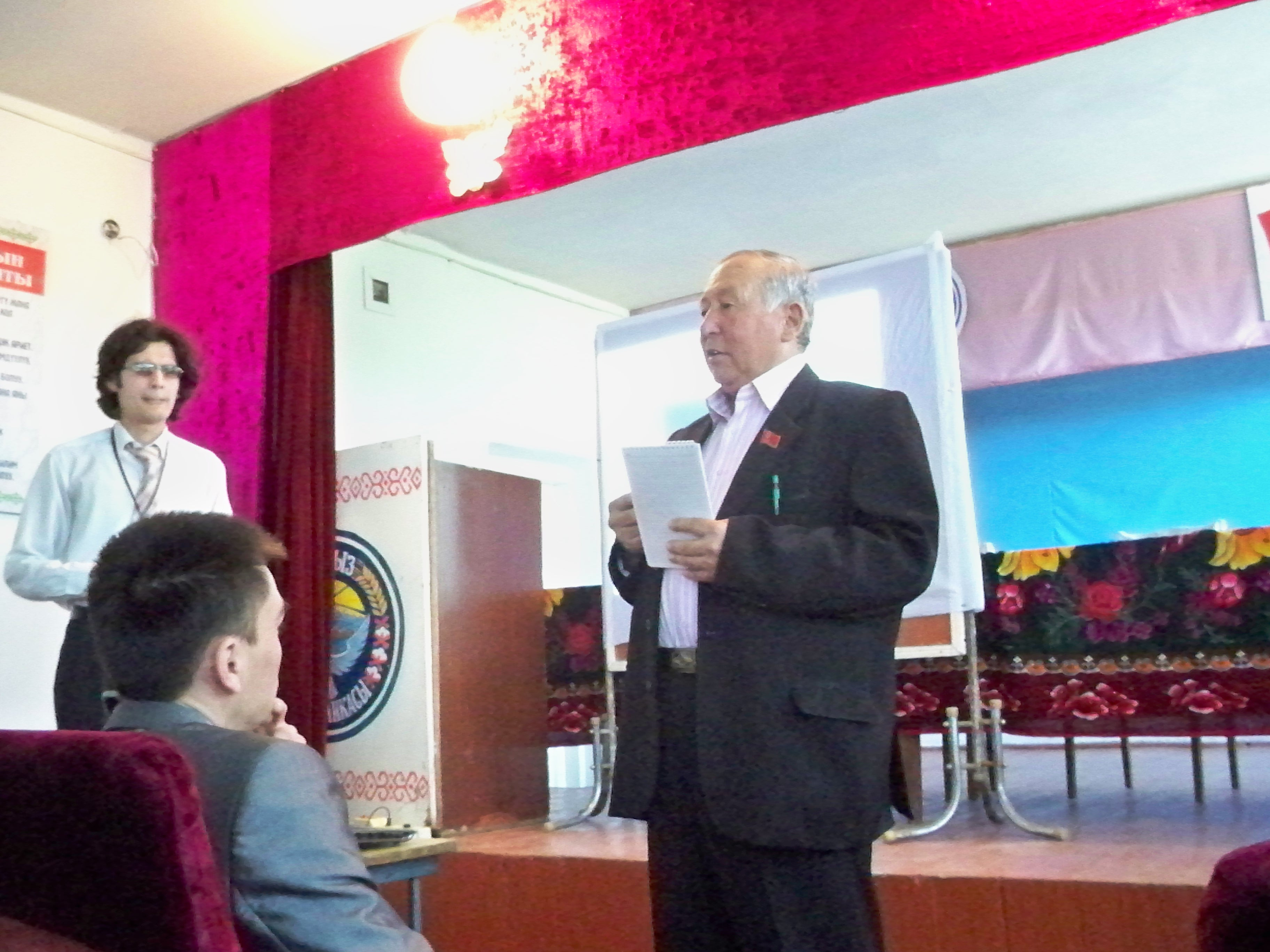
Shokirjon Toʻychiev in 2010. Toʻychiyev served as principal of the Uzbek Gymnasium from 2000 until 2010.

In 2014, not long before the official start of the test, it was decisively announced that the test would not be offered in Uzbek any longer. However, once the test was over, it was announced that those who had not yet registered could take the test in Uzbek in June. It was announced that students who wished to take the test in Uzbek could register only in Bishkek or Osh. Currently students can take the test only in Russian or Kyrgyz.

The discontinuation of the Uzbek test has made if difficult for the students of the Uzbek Gymnasium to score high. The NST scores of the students graduating in 2014 were the lowest in the school's history. While the average NST score of the graduate students was 116.44 in 2013, it fell to 101.32 the next year.

== Student body ==
The Uzbek gymnasium has a student government that tries to engage students in learning about democracy and leadership. The student body is run by a president who is chosen by the students of the school in direct elections.

== School anthem ==
The Uzbek gymnasium has an anthem that the students sing along with the National Anthem of the Kyrgyz Republic every morning before school starts. The lyrics of the school anthem were written by Davlatjon Boymatov, a teacher of Uzbek language and literature, and the music was composed by Saydulla Mamatqulov.
