= Neva Enfilade of the Winter Palace =

Palace in Saint Petersburg, Russia

Coordinates: 59.9404°N 30.3139°E

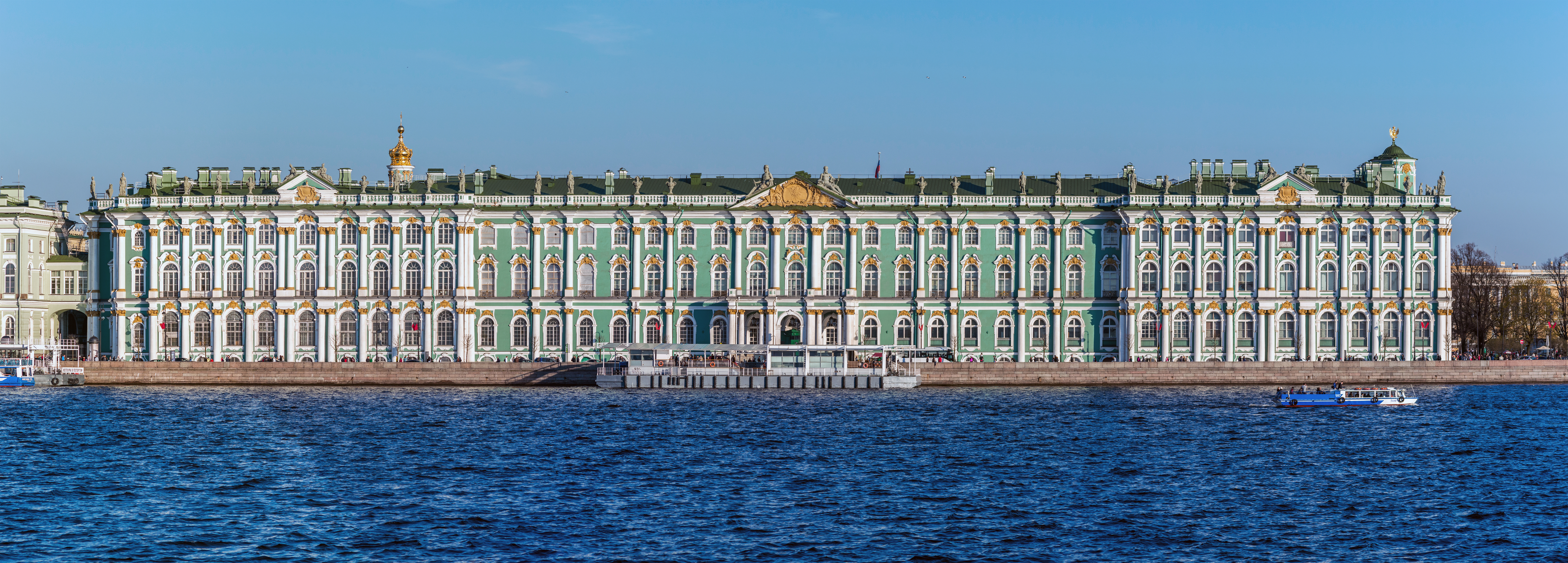
The Winter Palace's Neva facade. The enfilade is at the centre on the first floor.

The Neva Enfilade of the Winter Palace in Saint Petersburg, Russia, is a series of three large halls arranged in an enfilade along the palace's massive facade facing the River Neva.

Originally designed as a series of five state rooms by the architect Francesco Rastrelli in 1753, they were transformed into an enfilade of three vast halls in 1790 by Giacomo Quarenghi. Following a fire in 1837 they were rebuilt under the direction of Vasily Stasov. Frequently used as the palace ballrooms, they formed a processional route, and were the focus of the imperial court. In 1915, the last Tsar, Nicholas II, had the enfilade transformed into a military hospital. Following the Russian Revolution of 1917, the enfilade, along with the remainder of the building, has been used as a series of exhibition halls of the State Hermitage Museum.

== History ==
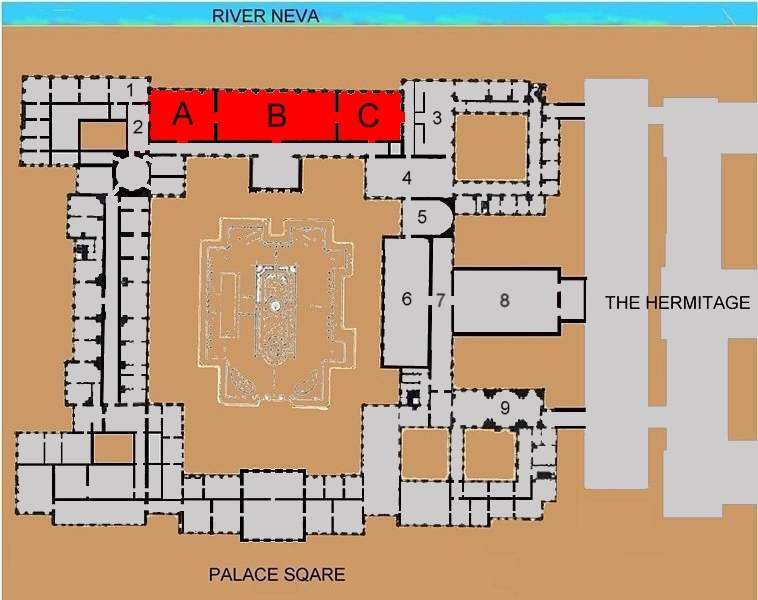
The Winter Palace's Neva enfilade is shaded red. A: Concert Hall; B: The Nicholas Hall; C: Great anteroom. 1:Malachite Drawing Room; 2: Arabian Hall; 3:Jordan Staircase; 4: Field Marshals' Hall; 5: Small Throne Room; 6: Armorial Hall; 7: Military gallery; 8: Great Throne Room; 9: Grand Church.

The palace was originally built in 1732, as an official residence for the Tsaritsa Anna I of Russia and designed by the architect Francesco Rastrelli. The Tsaritsa found the small Winter palace of Peter the Great insufficiently grand, and had taken over the neighbouring, and grander, palace of Admiral General Fyodor Matveyevich Apraksin, this she had rebuilt to form her own Winter Palace.

During the reign of Anna's successor, Elizabeth, Rastrelli, still working to his original plan, devised an entirely new scheme in 1753, on a colossal scale—the present Baroque Winter Palace (externally the palace seen today); the Tsaritsa wanted the palace to exceed in beauty and size all other European royal palaces. The expedited completion of the palace became a matter of national honour to the Empress, and to pay for it taxes were increased on salt and alcohol to fund the extra costs, although the Russian people were already burdened by taxes to pay for Russia's wars. The final cost was 2,500,000 rubles. By 1759, shortly before Elizabeth's death, an imperial palace truly worthy of the name was nearing completion; at that time, the Neva enfilade contained five principal state rooms. Work continued during the short reign of Elizabeth's nephew Peter III and on into the reign of Peter's widow Catherine the Great.

During Catherine the Great's reign, Neoclassicism came into vogue, and the new Tsaritsa was a great admirer. Rastrelli was dismissed and new architects working in the new fashions were employed. During this period, the original ornate rococo decoration of the palace was replaced with the more simple and stark neoclassicism which is a hallmark of the palace today. The Neva enfilade was completely redesigned between 1790 and 1793 by the architect Giacomo Quarenghi. Taking in the floor above, he transformed the original five rooms into three vast halls: the Concert Hall, the Great Hall and the Great Ante-Room. They were decorated in classical style with faux marbre and columns supporting life size statues.

Following a disastrous fire which destroyed most of the Winter Palace's interiors in 1837, the halls were recreated in similar style by the architect Vasily Stasov.

== Court use of the enfilade ==
A banquet in the Nicholas Hall in 1874

Until 1905, during the winter months, the Tsar and Tsaritsa were traditionally resident in the palace; this was the period of the Saint Petersburg social season and the first floor piano nobile would be in near constant use. The remainder of the year the imperial couple resided elsewhere, and the palace housed the staff and the officials of the monarchy, who occupied the ground and second floors. The halls of the enfilade were designed to form an important part in the ceremonial life of the court, not just as ballrooms for festivities but for processional use. From the entrance to the private apartments at the western end of the Concert Hall, imperial processions would proceed in state through the enfilade to the Jordan Staircase or turn and continue through the eastern state rooms.

Before 1917, during ceremonies and functions, access to the various hall of the enfilade was dictated by rank. Those who were most important were positioned closest to the beginning of an imperial procession in the Concert Hall, the lesser exalted in the Nicholas Hall and the least important in the Great Ante-Room. The imperial court was very conscious of rank. This was particularly obvious amongst the ladies attached to the court. Etiquette dictated that all these ladies, regardless of age, wore white silk dresses with a low decolletage and a red or olive green velvet train with gold embroidery. On their heads they wore red or green kokoshniks studded with jewels. While other women present were allowed coloured dresses, the train and kokoshnik was mandatory court dress.

Further classification was given to the women's ranks by indication of whether they were "Dames a Portrait" or "Demoiselles d'Honneur." The former, higher ranking class wore the Tsaritsa's portrait mounted in diamonds on their left breast, while the latter wore the Tsaritsa's monogram surrounded by diamonds. In between these two ranks were the "Dames du Palais" who like the "Dames a portrait" wore olive green, the lower ranking "Demoiselles d'Honneur" wore red.

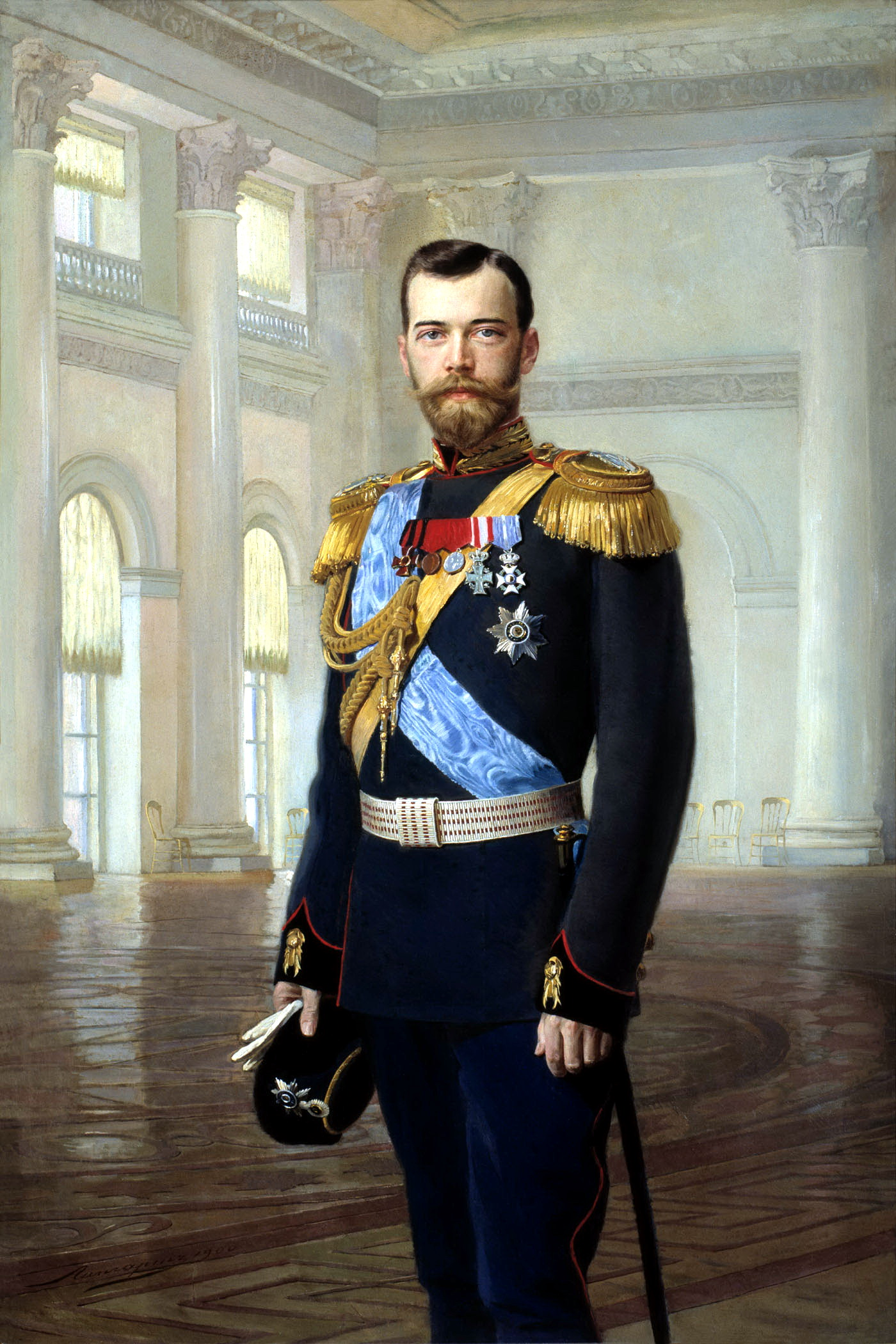
Nicholas II, last Tsar of all the Russias, in the Nicholas Hall. Portrait by Ernst Friedrich von Liphart (1900s)

1915, the Nicholas Hall transformed into a hospital ward

While red and green were the colours of the Tsar and Tsaritsa, further colour was added by the women attached to the numerous Grand Duchesses. Each Grand Duchess had her own colour, and all the ladies attached to the suite would wear it. Queen Victoria's foreign secretary, writing to her in 1894 of a state procession through the enfilade, recorded of the Grand Duchesses' colours that one "is a particularly hideous shade of orange." The Foreign Secretary then went on to describe the "8,000 to 10,000" people present in the Winter palace's "interminable halls", and a particular "Demoiselle d'Honneur" who was "so old that she was propped up against a wall." Overall, the splendour and size of the Winter Palace and its colourful and bejewelled ladies failed to impress the Foreign Secretary for he reported to the Queen that the Grand Church "was not very large" and that the assembled imperial court had "an absence of beauty as compared with that seen at one of Your Majesty's drawing rooms." He did, however, concede that the Queen's granddaughter looked "simply magnificent...the perfection of what one would imagine an Empress of Russia on her way to the altar would be." (Note: Quoting Lord Carrington to Queen Victoria; 14 November 1894.) That wedding of Queen Victoria's granddaughter to the Tsar was to be one of the final huge gatherings at the palace, however. The palace's state rooms had had their swan song during the reign of Alexander II between 1855 and 1881.

Alexander II was the last Tsar to use the Winter Palace extensively not only for governing the empire but also entertaining. Of special note were the Bals des Palmiers given at the palace. On these occasions, 100 palm trees were brought from the hot houses at Tsarskoe Selo; these would be scattered throughout the enfilade, and around them supper tables seating 15 people would be constructed. During the course of the evening the Tsar would make the rounds of the tables, eating a piece of bread or fruit at each, in order that the guests may say that they had dined with the Tsar.

Following the assassination of Alexander II, the Winter Palace was never truly inhabited again. The new Tsar Alexander III was informed by his security advisers that it was impossible to make the Winter Palace secure. The imperial family then moved to the seclusion of the Palace of Gatchina, some 40 miles from St. Petersburg. When in St. Petersburg, the imperial family resided at the Anichkov Palace, but the Winter Palace was used for official functions. Alexander III, however, was not a lover of society and, when using the Winter Palace, preferred playing bridge in an anteroom to dancing. While most St Petersburg balls did not conclude until 6am, at the Winter Palace, from 2am the Tsar would dismiss the musicians from the orchestra one by one, until only the pianist and a fiddler remained, by which time his guests had taken the hint and gone.

The final imperial reception at the Winter Palace was a themed, fancy dress ball celebrating the reign of Alexei I, which took place on 22 January 1903. The Grand Duke Alexander Mikhailovitch recalled the occasion as "the last spectacular ball in the history of the empire...[but] a new and hostile Russia glared through the large windows of the palace...while we danced, the workers were striking and the clouds in the Far East were hanging dangerously low." The entire imperial family, the Tsar as Alexei I and the Tsaritsa as Maria Miloslavskaya, all dressed in rich 17th century attire posed in the Hermitage's theatre, many wearing priceless original items brought specially from the Kremlin, for what was to be their final photograph together. The following year Russia was at war, and the Tsar and Tsaritsa abandoned St Petersburg, the Winter Palace, and high society (considered by the Tsaritsa to be decadent and immoral) for the greater comfort, security and privacy of Tsarskoe Selo.

== The Concert Hall ==
The Concert Hall, the Winter Palace, St Petersburg. Looking towards the doors of The Nicholas Hall. This room, closest to the private apartments was reserved for the court's elite. Watercolor by Alexander Kolb (1860s).

The Concert Hall has an architrave seemingly supported by paired Corinthian columns, the capitals of which serve as plinthes for life-size statues of the various muses. It is decorated in a similar loose Baroque influenced neoclassical style as the Great Anteroom at the western end of the Enfilade. It is indicative of the size of the Winter Palace, that whereas most other royal palaces such as Buckingham Palace, Queluz and Sanssouci all have music rooms, the Winter Palace has a concert hall. This is because it was the intention of the builders of the Winter Palace that their palace should outshine all other royal palaces. In fact Catherine the Great, for whom the enfilade was designed, was delighted when she bought an art collection for the Winter Palace that Frederick the Great, the creator of Sanssouci could not afford.

So it was, that from this vast double height hall that solemn imperial processions began. On such occasions the Concert Hall would be reserved for the highest ranking guest and members of the court. At a given moment, four "massive Ethiopians", the Tsar's official bodyguards, fantastically dressed in scarlet trousers, gold jackets, white turbans and curved shoes, would ceremonially open the doors from the private Arabian Hall (2 on plan above) and the imperial procession would pass through the enfilade. (Note: Sitwell writes: "These are no mere Negroes: they are Christian Abyssinians.") The procession through would be preceded by the Marshal of the Court carrying a gold staff seven feet high topped with a diamond crown. On less formal occasions, as the hall's name suggests, it was used for concerts, balls and grand receptions.

Today, as part of the State Hermitage Museum, the room houses the silver reliquary of St Alexander Nevsky, formerly at the Alexander Nevsky Monastery. The reliquary was brought to the palace in 1922, where it was set up to obscure the now blocked, grand doors from which the imperial family used to enter from the private apartments.

== The Nicholas Hall ==
The Nicholas Hall, by Konstantin Ukhtomsky (1879)

The Nicholas Hall is located in the centre of the enfilade. The largest room in the palace at 1,103 m^{2} (11,870 sq ft), it was originally simply known as the Great Hall, and was the setting for many imperial balls and receptions. Following the death of Nicholas I in 1855, a large equestrian portrait of the late tsar was hung from the wall, and the hall was renamed the Nicholas Hall.

While in the same architectural rhythm as the preceding Concert Hall, the architecture is more severe. Here, the architrave is immediately below the ceiling. The only ornamentation is the carving of the corinthian capitals and the entablature.

Writing in 1902, the Duchess of Sutherland and the American-born Duchess of Marlborough, herself the chatelaine of one of Britain's great palaces, described their impressions of a court ball held in the Nicholas Hall.

The Duchess of Sutherland wrote: "The stairs of the palace were guarded by cossacks, with hundreds of footmen in scarlet liveries, I have never in my life seen so brilliant a sight - the light, the uniforms, the enormous rooms, the crowd, the music, making a spectacle that was almost Barbaric in splendour...They seat at supper nearly four thousand people"

While the Duchess of Marlborough recorded that dinner (she sat beside the Tsar) was protracted and comprised "soups, caviar and monster sturgeons, meat and game, pates and primeurs, ices and fruits, all mounted on gold and silver plate fashioned by Germain"

Ironically, the Duchess of Sutherland then went on to describe the hungry peasants outside the gates - "... all the want of penury of the peasants and this strange show to keep up the prestige of the aristocracy and the autocracy of one gentle, quiet little man."

During World War I, the hall was used as an infirmary. It was restored in 1957, when the State Hermitage Museum was under the direction of Mikhail Artamonov.

== The Great Antechamber ==
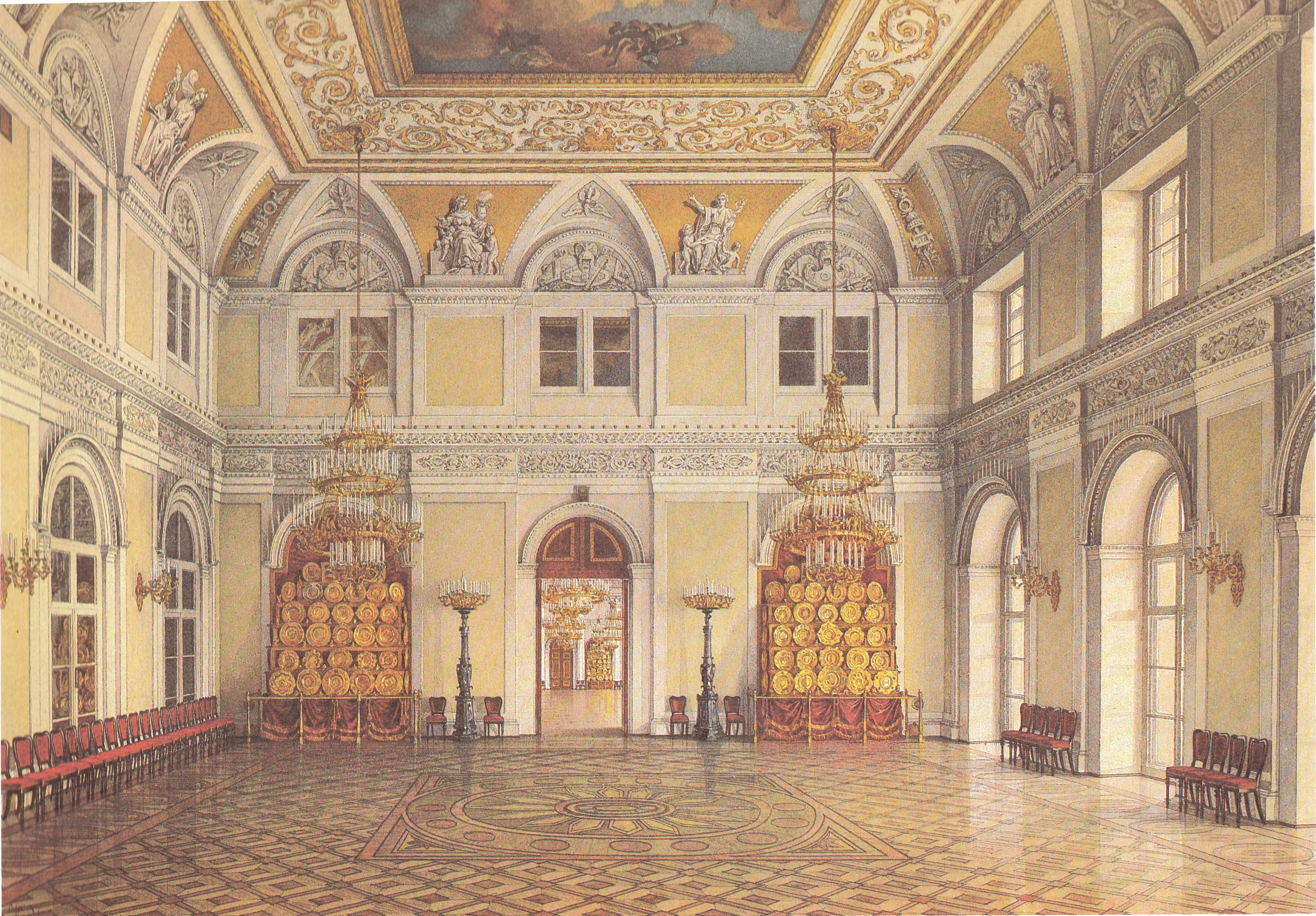
The Great Ante-Chamber, the Winter Palace, St Petersburg, by Konstantin Ukhtomsky (1861)

The Great Ante-Chamber of the Winter Palace is the principal entrance hall to the state apartments of the palace. The first room of the piano nobile at the head of the Jordan staircase, it formed the processional exit of the Neva enfilade, and presented a procession with a choice, either to descend the staircase and exit the palace, which happened once a year for the ceremony of blessing the waters of the Neva, or to turn right and continue through the next enfilade to the small throne room or continue on through the Armorial Hall and Military Gallery to the Great Throne Room or Grand Church.

== Exhibition halls ==
Today, as part of the State Hermitage Museum the halls of the Neva enfilade are preserved as "palace interiors" containing only minimal furniture they are used for exhibitions. Many of the mirrors which lined the interior walls opposite each window have been concealed behind exhibition boards which creates a utilitarian feel to the halls, and one has to look upwards to the carved captals, statues, great chandeliers and moulded ceilings to gain an impression of the hall's glacial grandeur and classical architecture.
