= Apollo Room =

Apollo Room may refer to:

- Apollo Room in the historic Raleigh Tavern in Williamsburg, Virginia, United States
- St George's Hall and Apollo Room of the Winter Palace, in Saint Petersburg, Russia
- Salon of Apollo in the Palace of Versailles, France
- Galerie d'Apollon in the Louvre Museum in Paris, France
