= St. George's Hall =

St. George's Hall may refer to:

- St George's Hall, Bradford
- St. George's Hall, Liverpool
- St. George's Hall, Reading
- St. George's Hall, state room at Windsor Castle
- St George's Hall and Apollo Room of the Winter Palace, Saint Petersburg
- St. George's Hall, London, a theatre located at Langham Place, Regent Street & St. Marylebone in London, England
- St George's Bristol
- St. George's Hall, housing the Arts and Letters Club in Toronto
- The Hall of the Order of St. George in the Grand Kremlin Palace
