= Russian court dress =

Style of clothing of Russian aristocrats

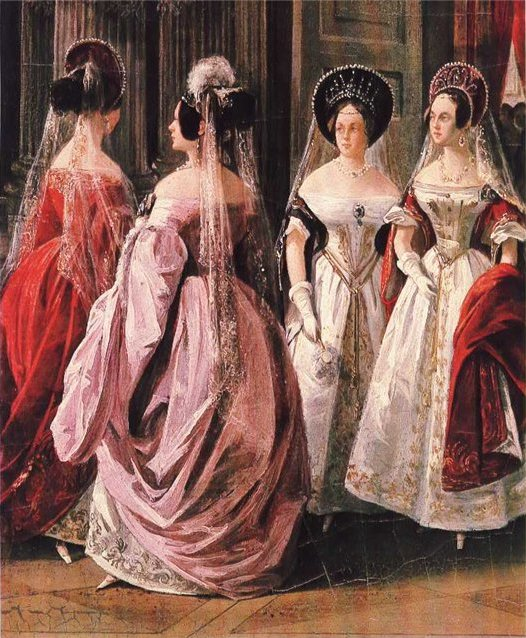
The Armorial Hall of the Winter Palace (detail). A. Ladurner (1834)

Russian court dress was a special regulated style of clothing that aristocrats and courtiers at the Russian imperial court in the 19th-20th centuries had to follow. Clothing regulations for courtiers and those invited to the court are typical for most European monarchies, from the 17th century to the present. In Russia, court etiquette and, accordingly, court dress ceased to exist in 1917 due to the abolition of the monarchy. This style of clothing, especially the woman's dress is known for its long drape sleeves that resemble capes that have a point at the end of each and a sash, which was made popular in the modern world by the 1956 film Anastasia and the 1997 animated film Anastasia.

== Women's Dress ==
The first attempts to officially regulate the ladies' court dress date back to the end of the 18th century, during the reign of Paul I. Women during the coronation celebrations were ordered to wear robes (Pannier dresses in Pre-Empire styles) made of black velvet with a train of the same material. Countess and maid of honour Varvara Golovina writes that during the coronation "everyone was in full dress: court dresses appeared for the first time." The first mentions of 'Russian dress' date back to the 1700s, meaning an outfit that borrowed the cut and some features from traditional Russian folk costume, and looked like a Sarafan. Russian dresses were presented by Alexander I to Prussian women who arrived in Saint Petersburg for the betrothal of Grand Duchess Catherine Pavlovna to Duke George of Oldenburg in 1809.

At the coronation of Nikolai I in 1826, according to the French writer Jacques-François Ancelot:

Women were supposed to appear in national costume, and only a few disobeyed this order. The national attire, coquettishly modified and luxuriously decorated, imparted a piquant originality to ladies' costumes. Women's headdresses. a kind of diadem made of silk, embroidered with gold and silver, shone with diamonds. A corset adorned with sapphires and emeralds encased her chest in sparkling armor, and from under a short skirt, legs in silk stocking and embroidered shoes were visible. Long braids with large bows at the ends fell on the shoulders of the girls.

Under Nikolai I, Russian dress acquired official status at the imperial court. In the "Description of ladies' outfits for arrival on solemn days to the royal court" (27 February 1834), women's court dress was strictly regulated in terms of styles, colours, and finishes. A single court attire consisted of a velvet top dress with long folding sleeves and a train. In front, at the bottom of the waist, there was a slit that opened a skirt made of arbitrary white matter, most often satin. Along the "tail and slide" of the dress was gold embroidery, "the same as the sewing of the ceremonial uniforms of the court ranks." The same sewing was supposed to be "around and on the front of the skirt". In addition, all ladies were supposed to wear a "povoynik" or "kokoshnik" of an arbitrary colour with a white veil, and for the girls, a bandage of arbitrary colour with a veil.

The colour of the upper dress depended on the status of the lady. State ladies, and maids of honour were supposed to wear a green dress. Tutors of the Grand Duchesses, blue. Maids of honour of the empress, crimson. Maids of honour of the Grand Duchesses, light blue. Chambermaids of honour, raspberry. The style of the dress the ladies wore also had to correspond to a single pattern, they could be "of different colours, with different sewing, but it was impossible to repeat the pattern assigned to the ladies of the court."

Such a regulation of women's court dress was in effect through the reign of Nikolai I. The slightest deviations made him angry. For underage Grand Duchesses, Nikolai considered adult formal dress too immodest; girls were not supposed to wear a train, neckline, or too much jewelry.

Apart from some changes, the general style of court dress was preserved in Russia for more than eighty years, until the Russian Revolution in 1917. The luxury of court attire amazed guests and foreigners, as evidenced in numerous memoirs and letters of the era. The World Illustrated magazine describes in detain the reception at the Winter Palace in 1895 on the occasion of the presentation of court ladies to Empress Alexandra Feodorovna:

The magnificent white Nikolaevsky Hall was filled with ladies by half past one. Here in all its brilliance, the beauty and richness of the original Russian costume showed up. The picturesqueness of the collection... begged for the artist's brush. What luxurious kokoshniks were here... what rich sundresses made of velvet, silk, Indian fabrics, what rich brocade, fur trime, flowers, lace, what a variety of colours and shades from dark green, blue, to delicate and light green, pink, purple. Among this brilliance and wealth of toilets, diamonds, and precious stones and a significant mass of red armbands and red, embroidered with gold trains of the ladies-in-waiting of the large court, masters of ceremonies with wands walked here and there in their court uniforms sewn with gold.

== Examples ==
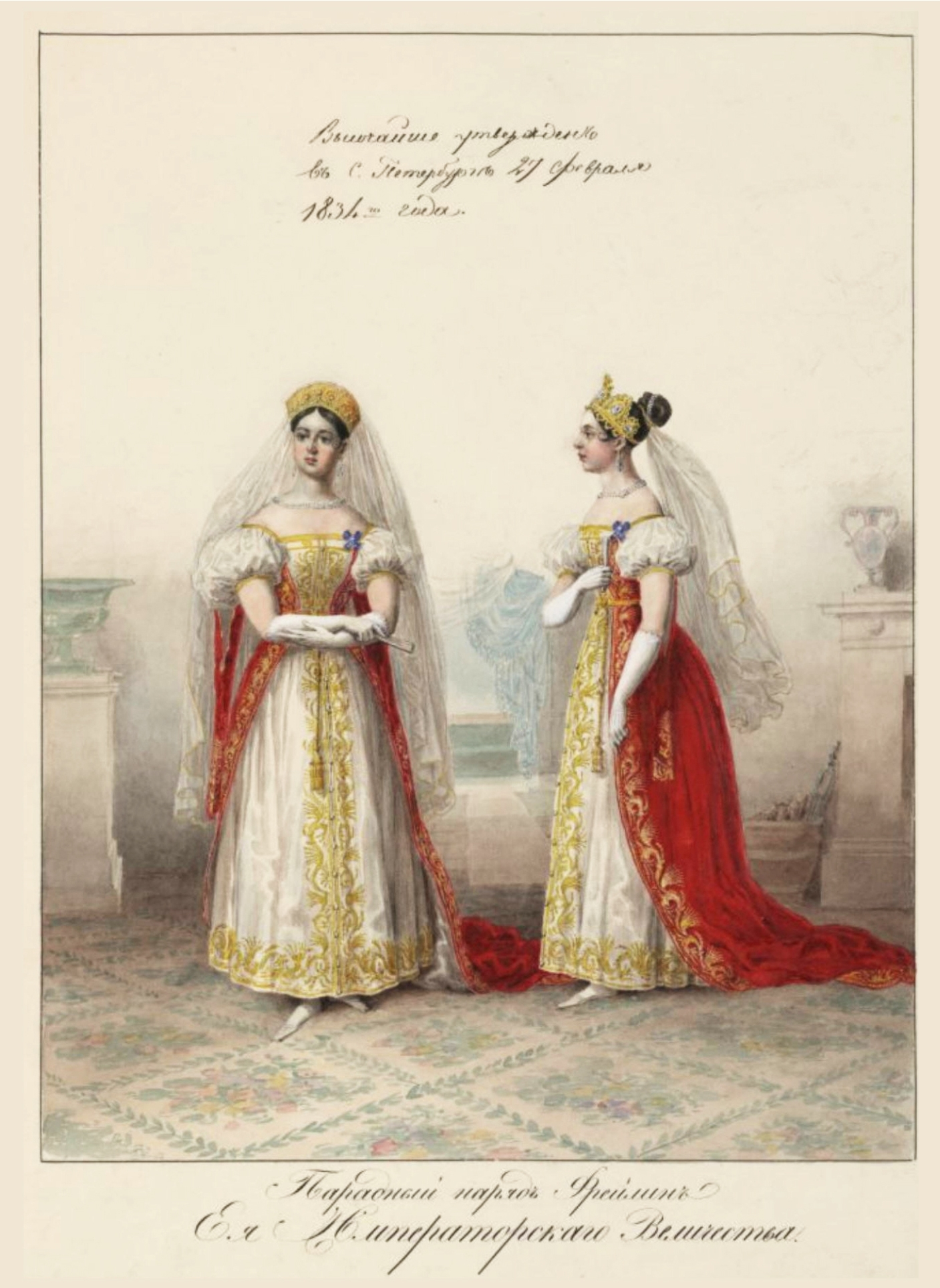
Court ladies' outfits, 1834 album. The ladies-in-waiting of the Empress in a red "sarafan" with a white skirt, gold embroidery and a carved gold kokoshnik.

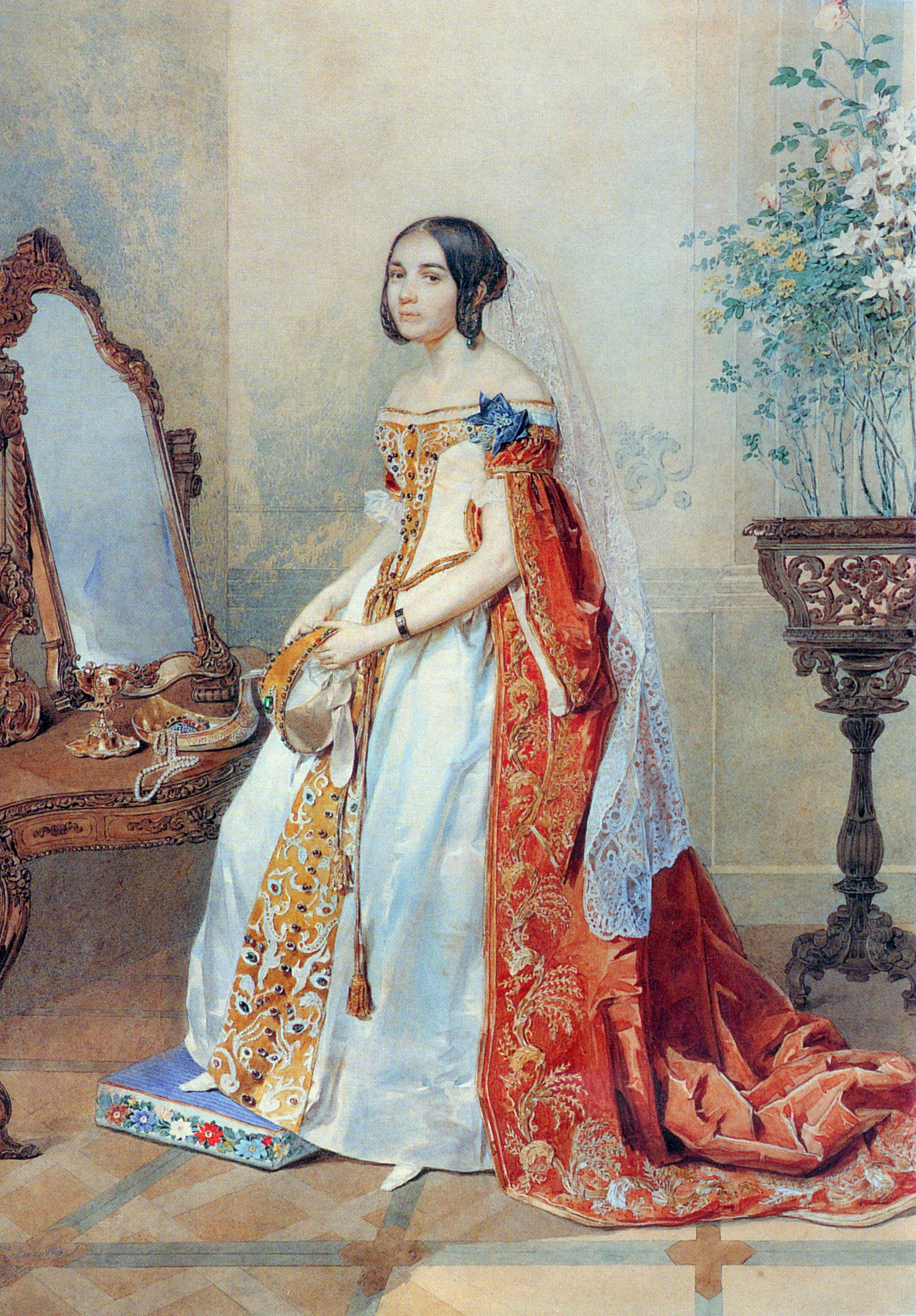
Maria Petrovna Kikina-Volkonskaya is depicted in the Russian court dress of a lady-in-waiting, 1839.

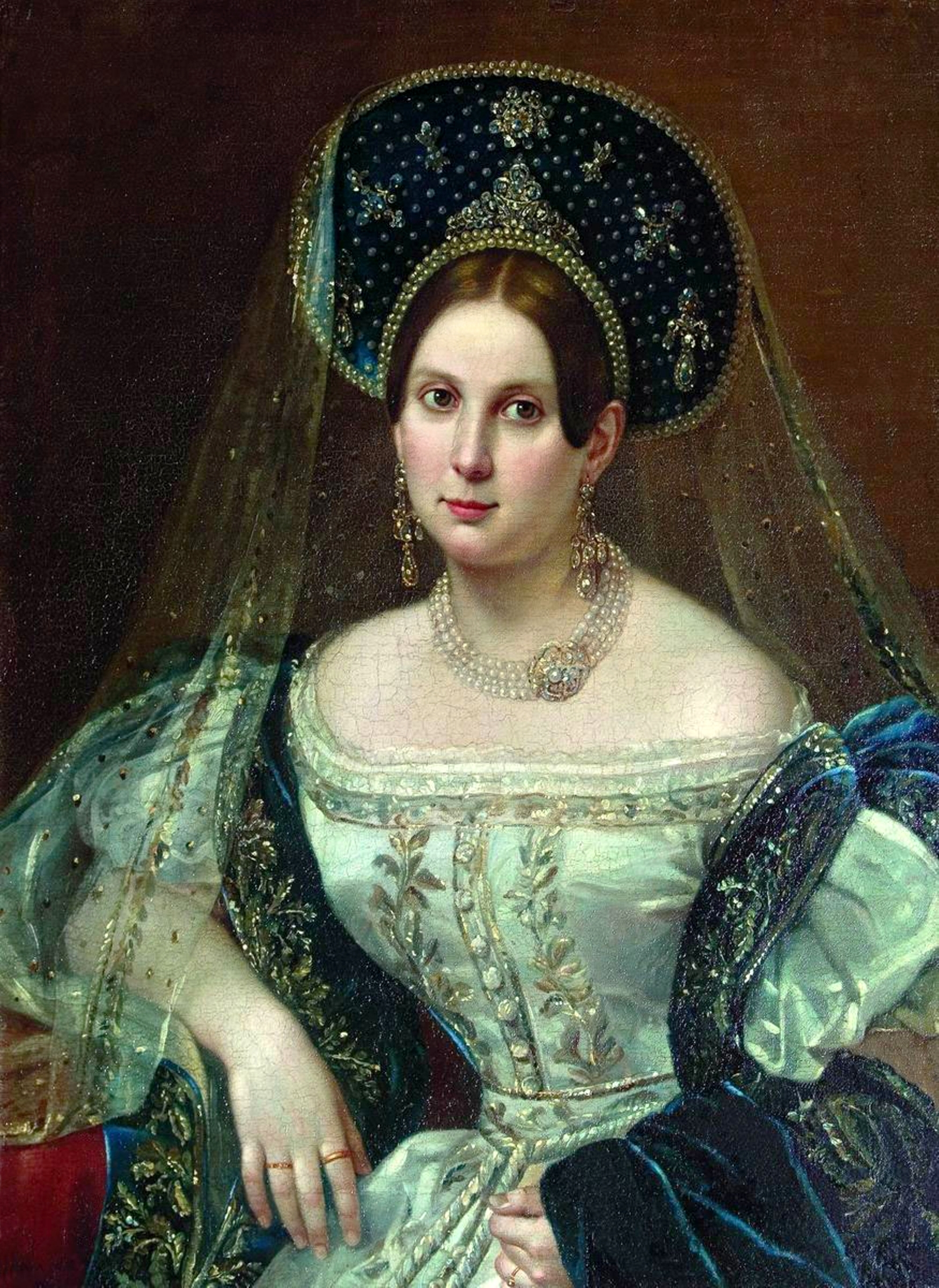
Pimen Orlov. Portrait of an unknown woman in a Russian court dress. Around 1835, Hermitage Museum.

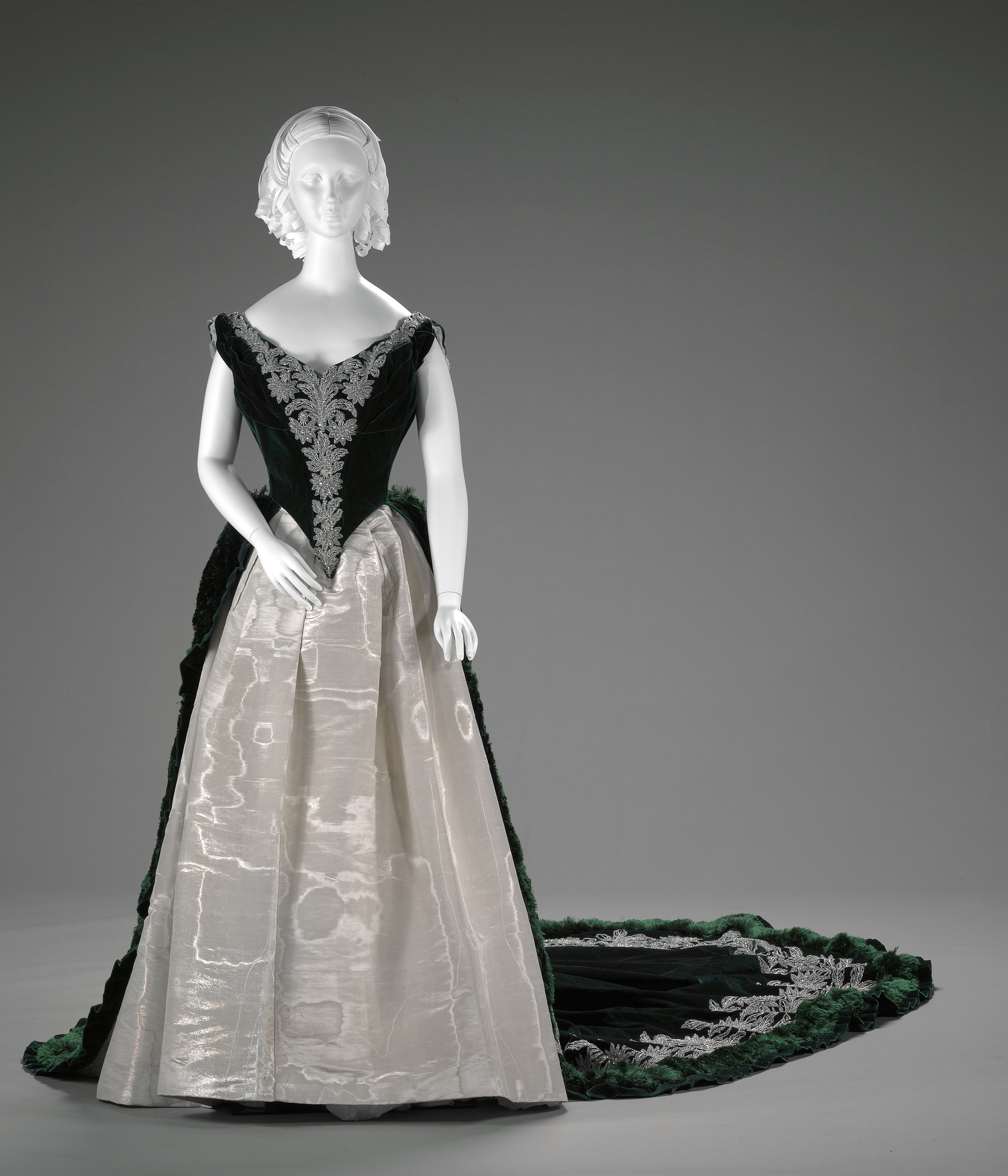
Russian court dress by French fashion designer Charles Frederick Worth, 1888.

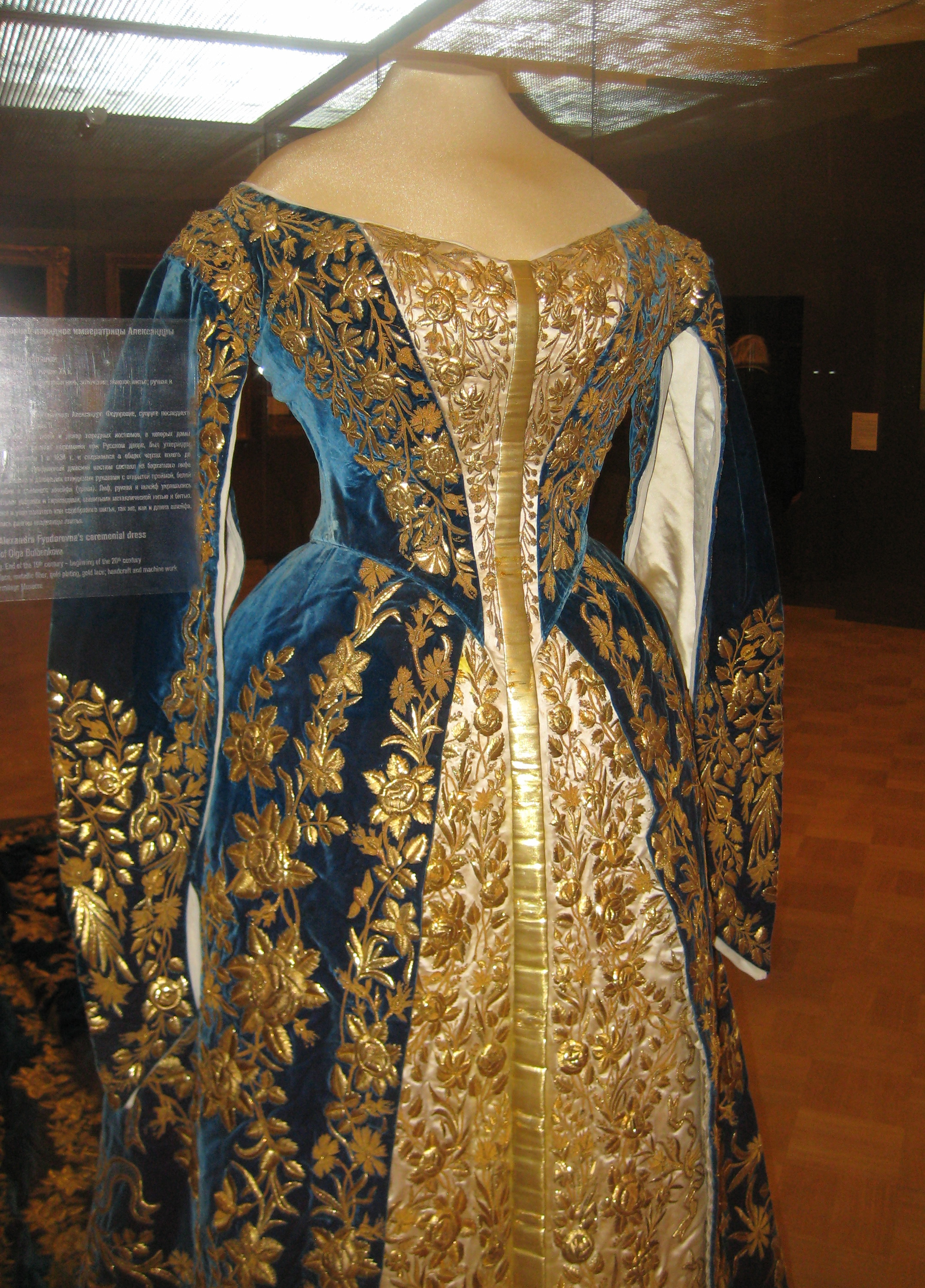
Ceremonial dress of Empress Alexandra Feodorovna. Workshop of O. Bulbenkova, late XIX-early. XX centuries, Hermitage Museum.

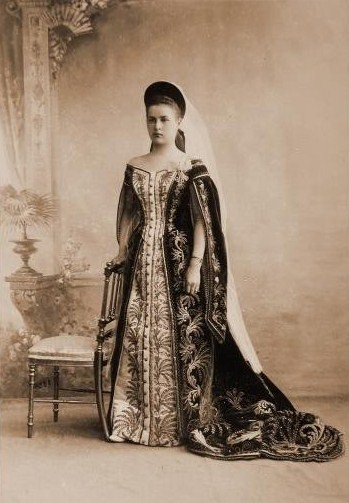
Princess Olga Nikolaevna Repnina-Volkonskaya, 1890s.

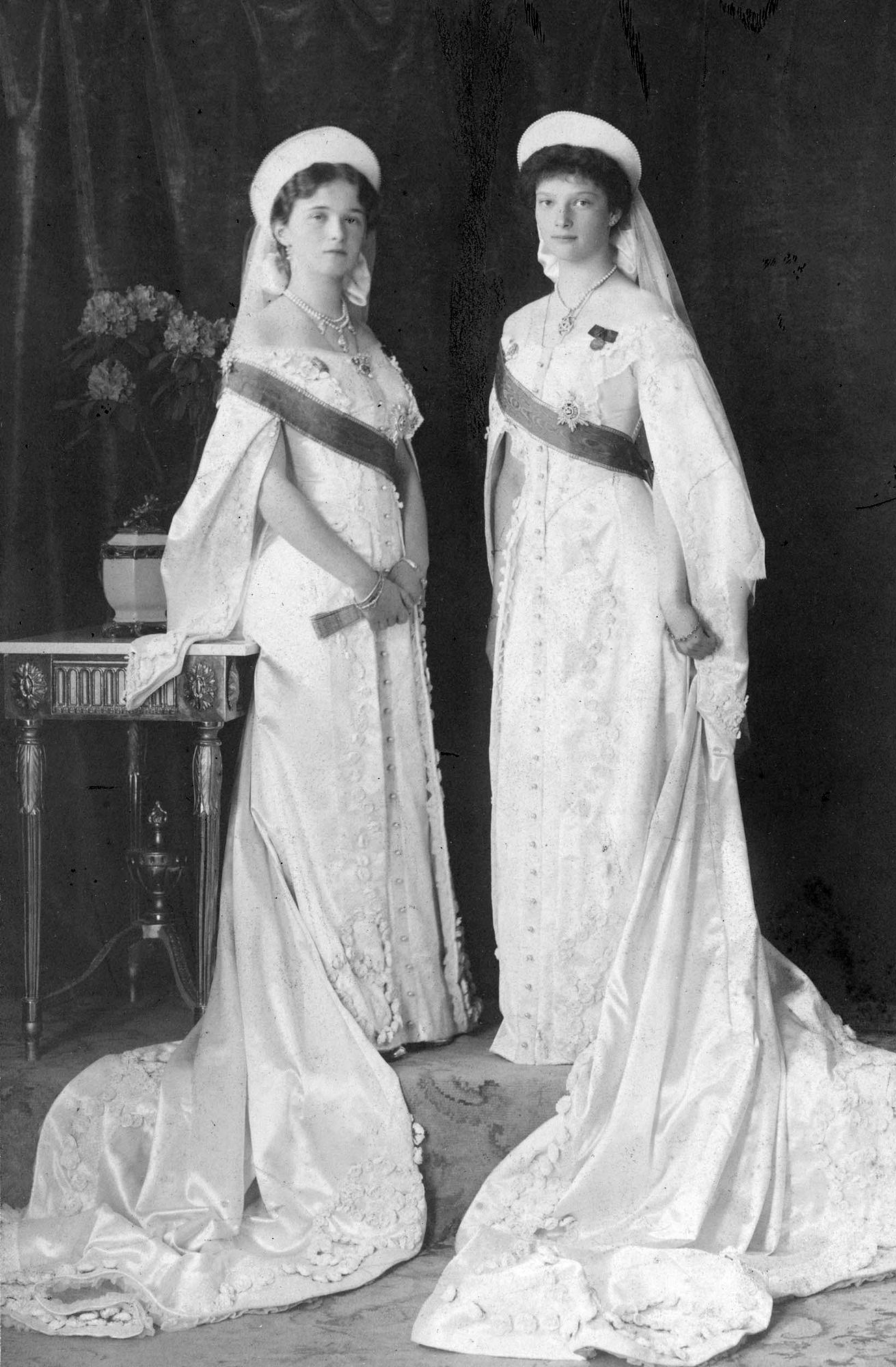
Grand Duchess Olga Nikolaevna and Grand Duchess Tatiana Nikolaevna wearing court dress including sashes, kokoshnik, and veils, 1913.

== Men's Suit ==
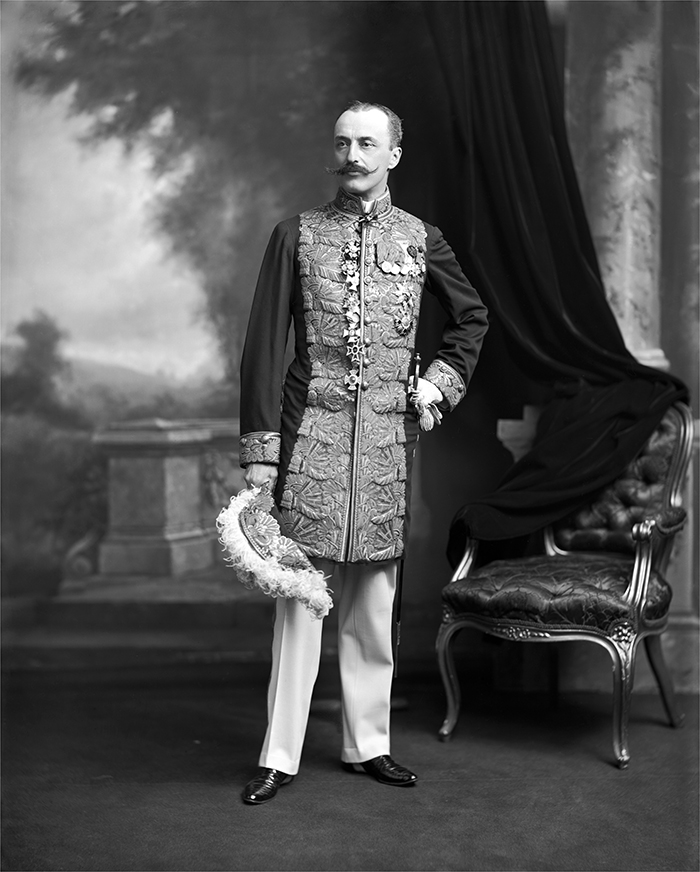
Ceremonial uniform of a chamberlain. Large gold embroidery on the chest

As in the case of women's attire, vague references to court uniforms date back to the end of the 18th century, but the first surviving detailed description refers only to 1831 and is contained in the 'Regulations on Uniforms for the Ranks of the Imperial Court'. In 1834, this decree was replaced by a more general 'Regulation on civil uniforms;, which was accompanied by colour drawings depicting uniforms and sewing. Both decrees regulated the cut and trim of military and civilian uniforms. Both those and others were sewn from dark green cloth, had standing collars and cuffs made of red cloth, decorated with gold embroidery and gilded buttons depicting the state emblem. The court ranks relied on civilian cut uniforms. The pattern and abundance of sewing depended on the rank and status of the person.

Each courtier was supposed to have a ceremonial uniform, as well as a dark green uniform tailcoat and frock coat. The court uniform was supposed to be worn with knee-length white breeches with white stockings and shoes for civil court officials, with over the knee boots for the military. White trousers with gold stripes were worn under the dress uniform on especially solemn occasions; dark green trousers also with stripes, under the uniform, black trousers without stripes, with a tailcoat or frock coat. The uniform was complemented by a black triangular hat with a cockade and sewing according to the status and rank of the person.

Changes in the regulated court style were made under Alexander II. First, in 1855, here was an attempt to introduce 'French caftans' at the court, but the following year, in the decree of 20 February 1856 'On the new form of clothing for court officials', all the dress and uniforms were replaced by single-breasted semi-caftans with floors above the knees, nine buttons, a stand-up collar bevelled at the front, with straight split cuffs, and vertical pocket flaps at the back. In the 'Rules on the Wearing of Established Uniforms by Court Ranks' dated 15 August 1855, five types of uniforms were distinguished: full dress, festive, ordinary, everyday (or service), and travel. From the 1850s to 1917, no significant changes were made.

== In popular culture ==
In the 1997 20th Century Fox animated film Anastasia, the yellow court gown Anya wears towards the end of the film is almost an exact replica of one the Grand Duchess herself had worn.

== Literature ==
- Vyskochkov, L.V. (2010). "To be ladies in Russian dress": ceremonial costume of court ladies in the first half of the 19th century". Proceedings of the Faculty of History of St. Petersburg University (2): 181–188. ISSN 2221-9978.
- Zimin, Igor (2014). People of the Winter Palace. Monarchs, their favorites and servants. Series: 400 years of the House of the Romanovs. Centerpolygraph. ISBN 978-5-227-09463-6.
- Shepelev, Leonid Efimovich (2005). Titles, uniforms and orders of the Russian Empire. Centerpolygraph.

== External links section ==
- "Servants of the Highest Court" Livery costume of the late 19th – early 20th century in the collection of the State Hermitage
- Regulation of fashion by legal acts in Russia (18th–20th centuries)
- Exhibition of court costume from the Hermitage collection
- Court costume in the Tsarskoye Selo Museum-Reserve
