= Armorial Hall of the Winter Palace =

The Armorial Hall of the Winter Palace, Saint Petersburg, is a vast chamber originally designed for official ceremonies. The Armorial Hall is located between the Military Gallery and the palace courtyard.

The current hall was designed by Vasily Stasov in the late 1830s, after the original hall was damaged by an extensive palace fire in 1837; it was at this time that the fluted columns were gilded. Along with St George's Hall and the Nicholas Hall, it was one of the palace's main areas for entertaining. The edges of the hall are decorated with vast stucco panoplies. In the center of the hall sits a lapidary vase made of aventurine from 1842.

Under the direction of Anatoly Lunacharsky, who became the Commissar of Enlightenment after the October Revolution, the Armorial Hall was used as a concert hall, with a capacity of up to 2,000.

Today, as part of the State Hermitage Museum, this room retains its original decoration.

== Photographs of the Hall, taken in 2008 ==
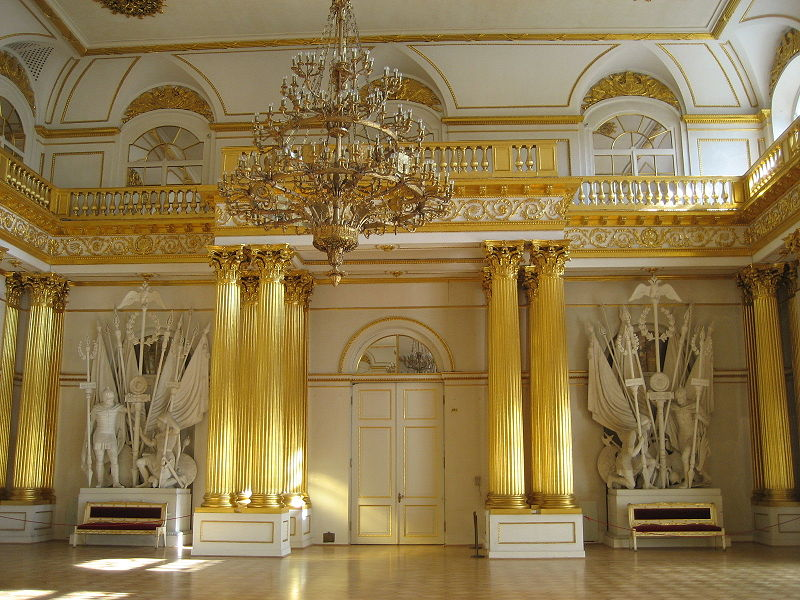
The Armorial Hall

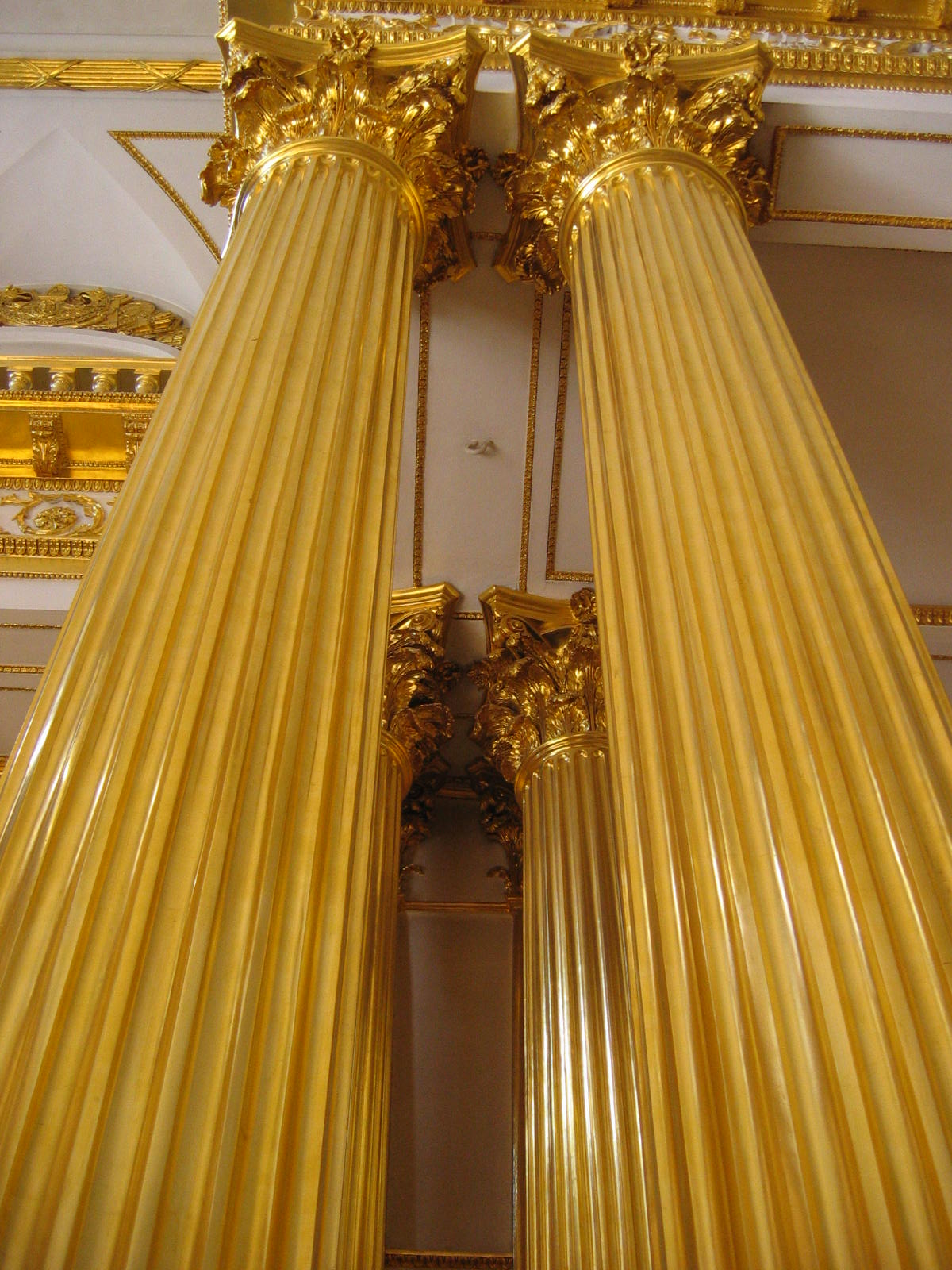
Closeup of the gold pillars

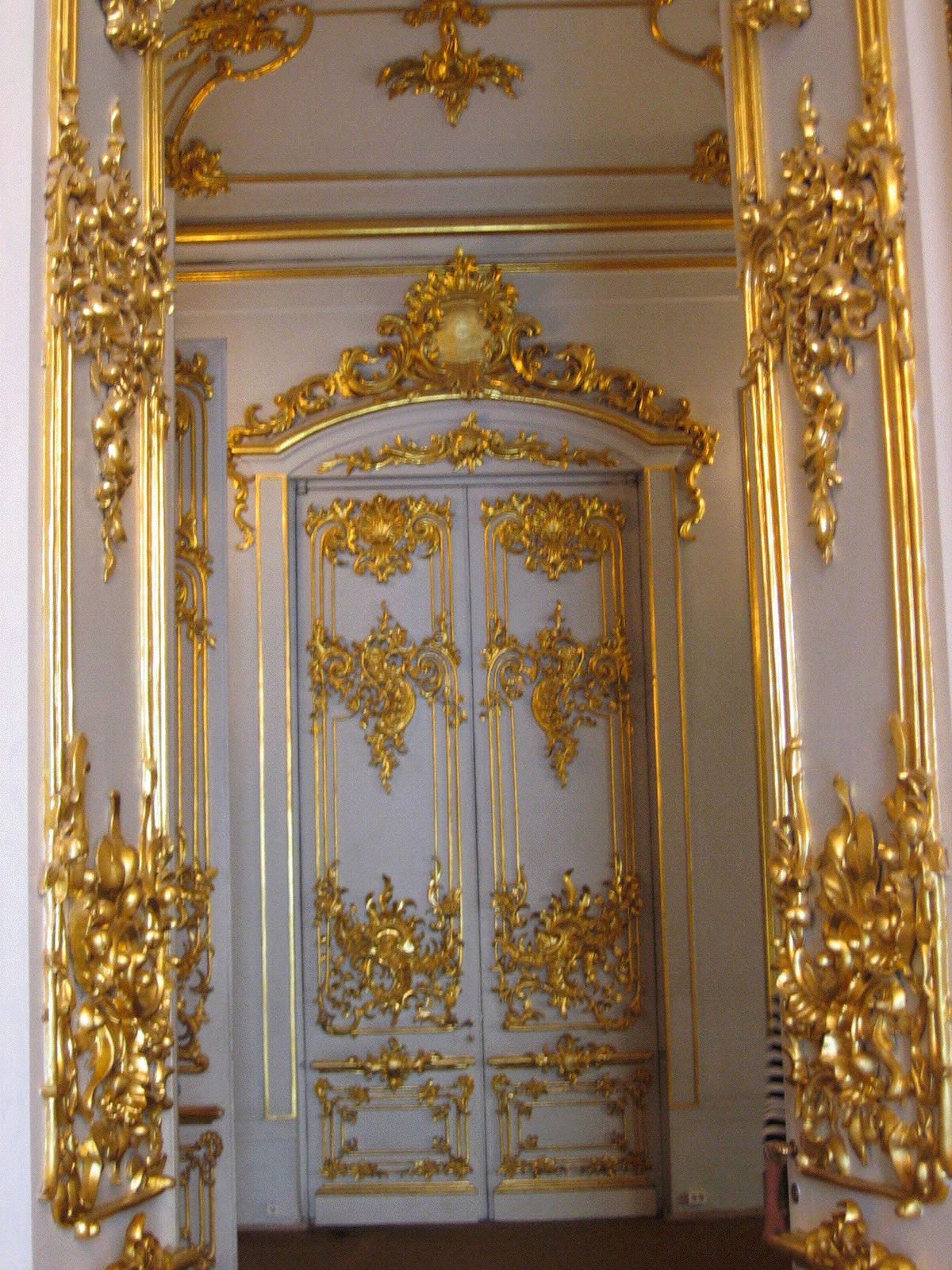
Closeup of the door

Location of the Hall within the Palace
