= Jordan Staircase of the Winter Palace =

Staircase in the Winter Palace, St. Petersburg

Coordinates: 59.9413°N 30.3141°E

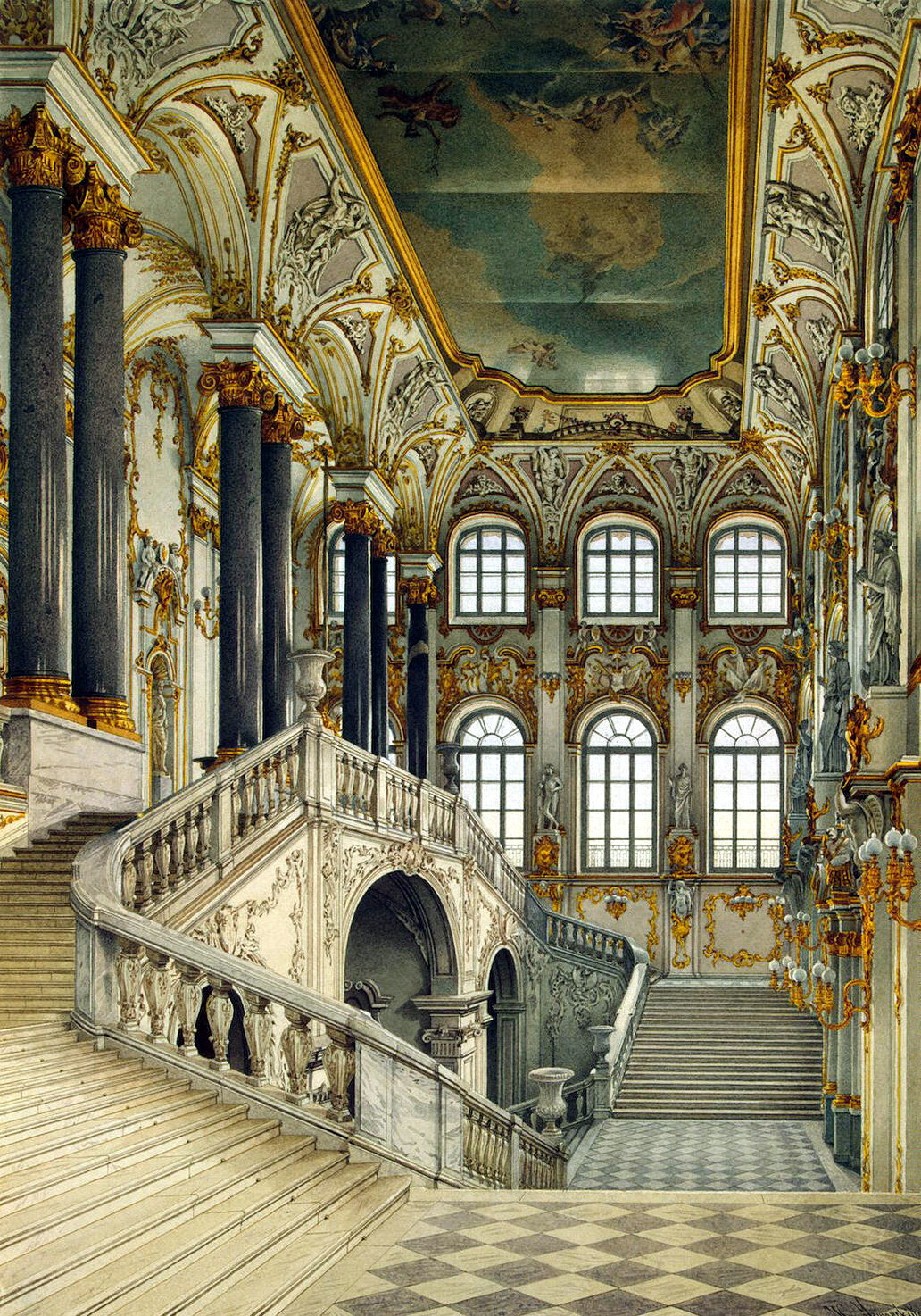
The Jordan Staircase of the Winter Palace, by Konstantin Ukhtomsky (1866)

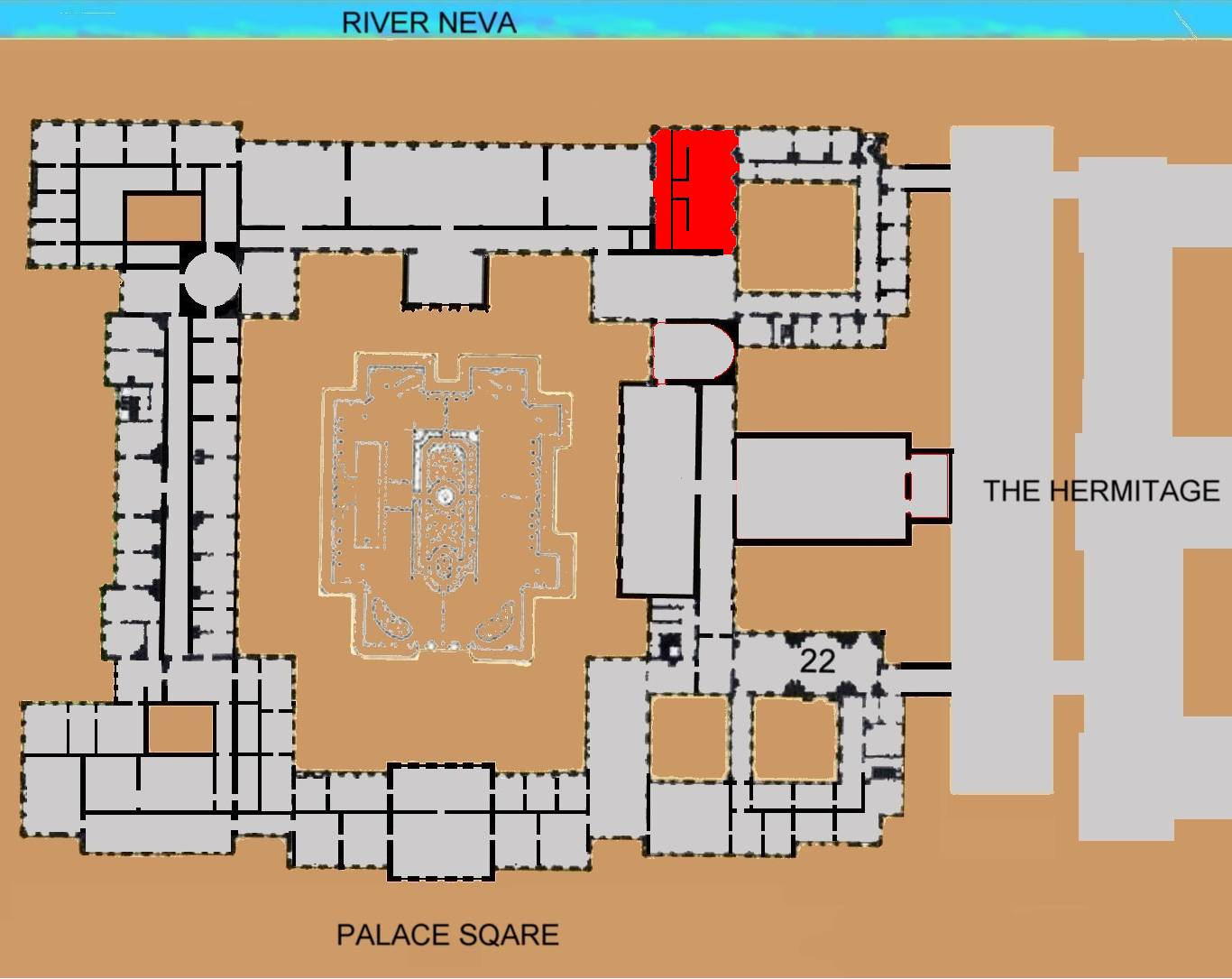
Location of the Jordan Staircase, within the palace.

The principal or Jordan Staircase of the Winter Palace, St Petersburg is so called because on the Feast of the Epiphany the Tsar descended this imperial staircase in state for the ceremony of the "Blessing of the Waters" of the Neva River, a celebration of Christ's baptism in the Jordan River. The staircase is one of the few parts of the palace retaining the original 18th-century style. The massive grey granite columns, however, were added in the mid 19th century.

The staircase was badly damaged by a fire that swept the palace in 1837, but Nicholas I ordered the architect in charge of reconstruction, Vasily Stasov, to restore the staircase using Francesco Bartolomeo Rastrelli's original plans. Stasov made two small changes: he replaced the original gilt bronze handrails with white marble and the original pink columns with gray granite.

The stair hall, which has an 18th-century ceiling depicting the Gods at Olympus, is decorated with alabaster statues of Wisdom and Justice by Mikhail Terebenev (1795-1866); Grandeur and Opulence by Alexander Ustinov (1796-1868); Fidelity and Equity by Ivan Leppe; and Mercury and Mars by Apollon Manyulov. At the centre of the first landing is an anonymous 18th-century marble sculpture, Allegory of the State.

During state receptions and functions the Jordan Staircase was a focal point for arriving guests. After entering the palace through the Ambassadors' entrance, in the central courtyard, they would pass through the colonnaded ground floor Jordan Hall before ascending the staircase to the state apartments. Following a ball at the Winter Palace in 1902, the Duchess of Sutherland wrote: "The stairs of the palace were guarded by cossacks, with hundreds of footmen in scarlet liveries, I have never in my life seen so brilliant a sight—the light, the uniforms, the enormous rooms, the crowd, the music, making a spectacle that was almost Barbaric."

Today, as part of the State Hermitage Museum, this room retains its original decoration.

== Architecture ==
The Jordan Staircase is a double-height staircase. As visitors to the Winter Palace ascended the stairs of the palace from the lower, shaded area, they entered a large room, flooded with light from the two tiers of windows on the Neva, which was reflected in the mirrors of the symmetrical set of portholes on the opposite side. Rastrelli had used this idea before: in the Dancing Hall of the Great Peterhof Palace (1751-1752), in the Grand Staircase and the Great Hall of the Palace at Tsarskoye Selo (1751-1756).

At the top of the stairs, Rastrelli arranged a small gallery separated from the rest of the space by twin columns. The main entrance to the suit of the Neva is decorated by a magnificent portal with columns supporting a pediment with a cartouche and a sculpture. On either side of the portal are niches with statues of Mars and Apollo. In 1758 the finishing work began. On the second tier of the walls on pedestals, allegorical statues of Justice, Mercy, Military Valour and Prosperity of Trade were set up. Bas-reliefs of banners and trophies of war have been placed in the sandriques of the large windows.

Rastrelli was commissioned by F. Fontebasso in Italy to create the picturesque plafond. The banisters and balusters of the stairs, the vases as well as the bases of the columns were to be made of gilded copper. The walls were to be painted pink, while the stucco rocaille would remain white. However, by 1761 the walls and wooden columns were clad in artificial marble and the rococoils were gilded.

== Gallery ==
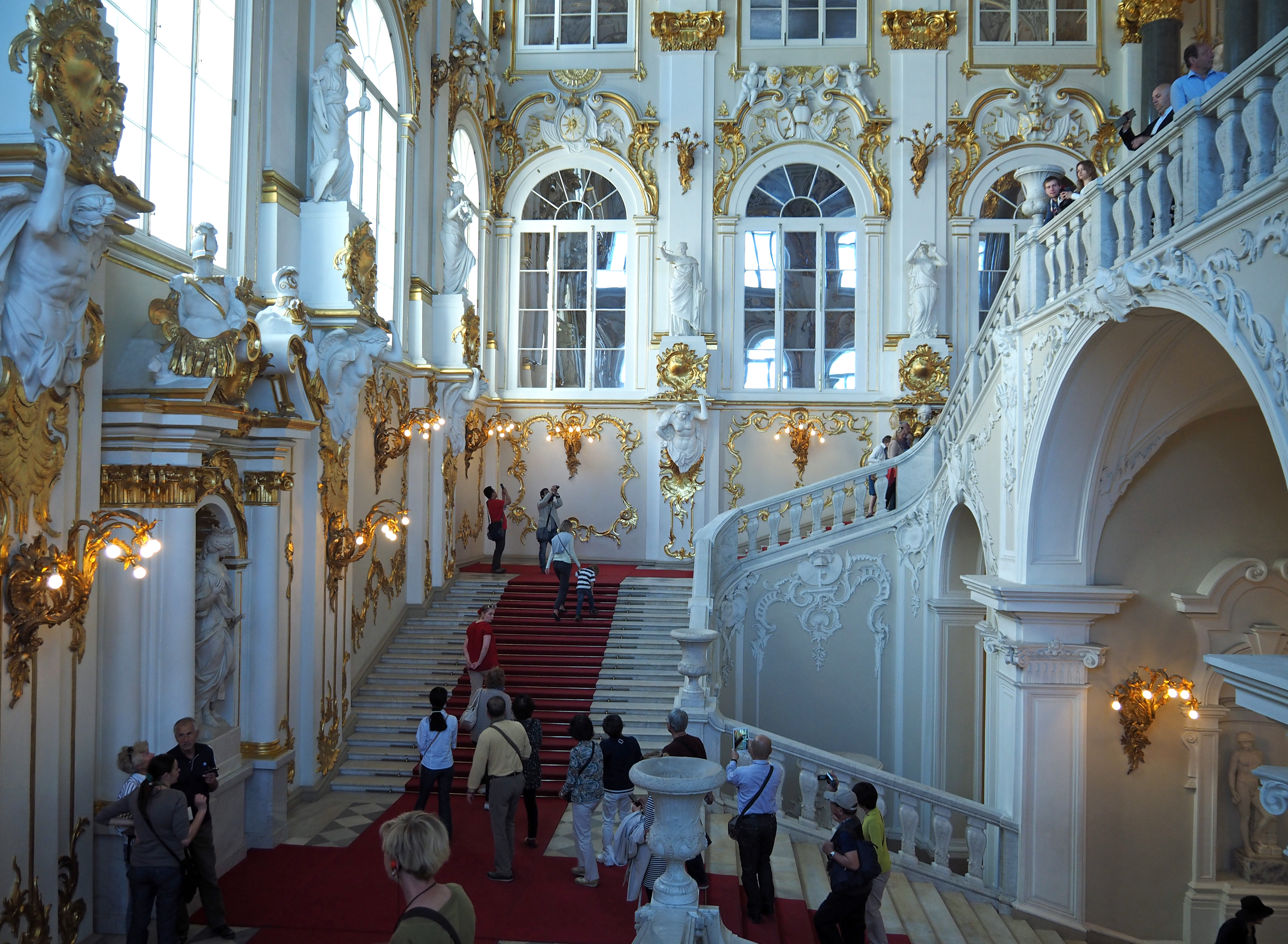

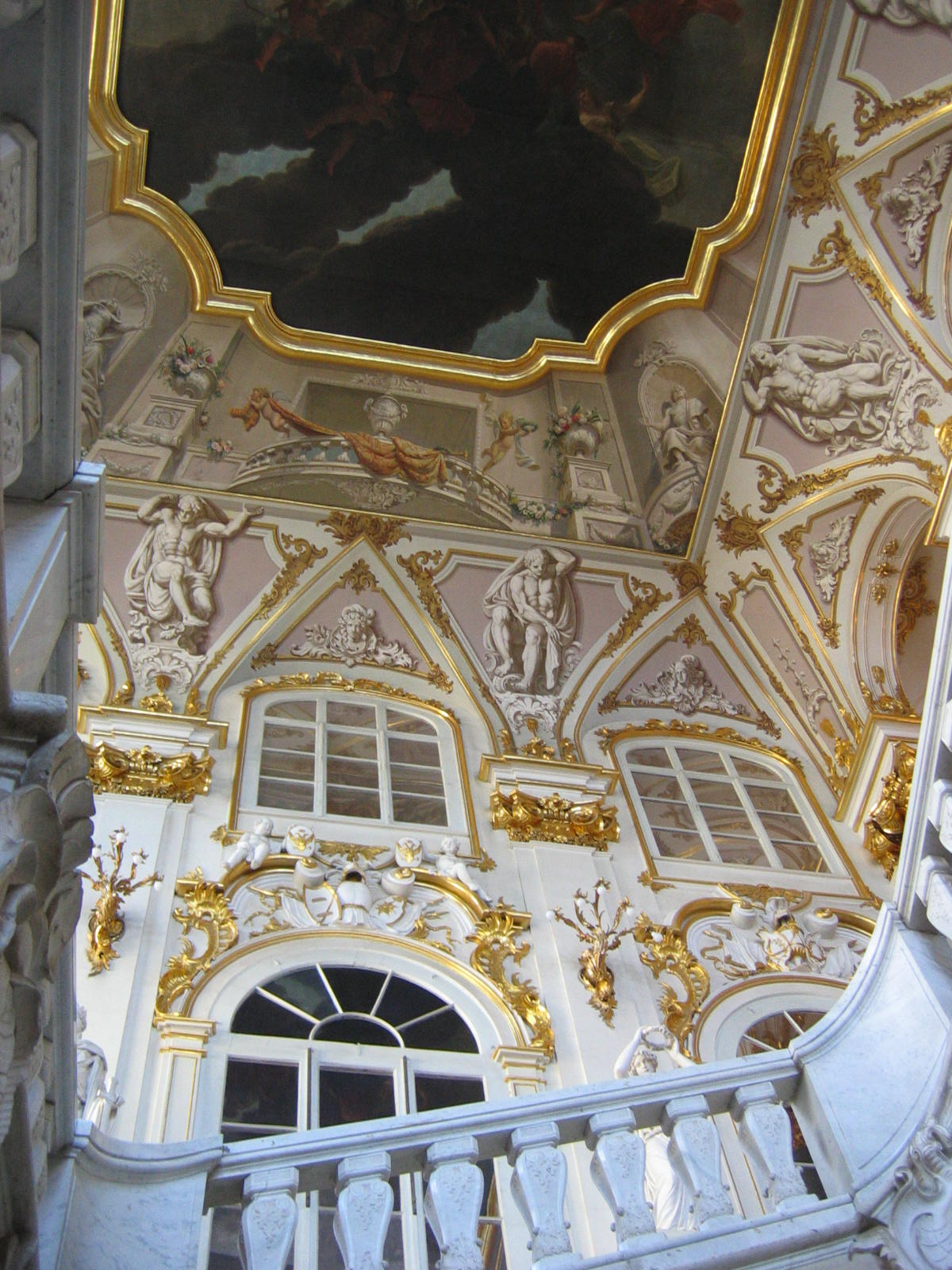

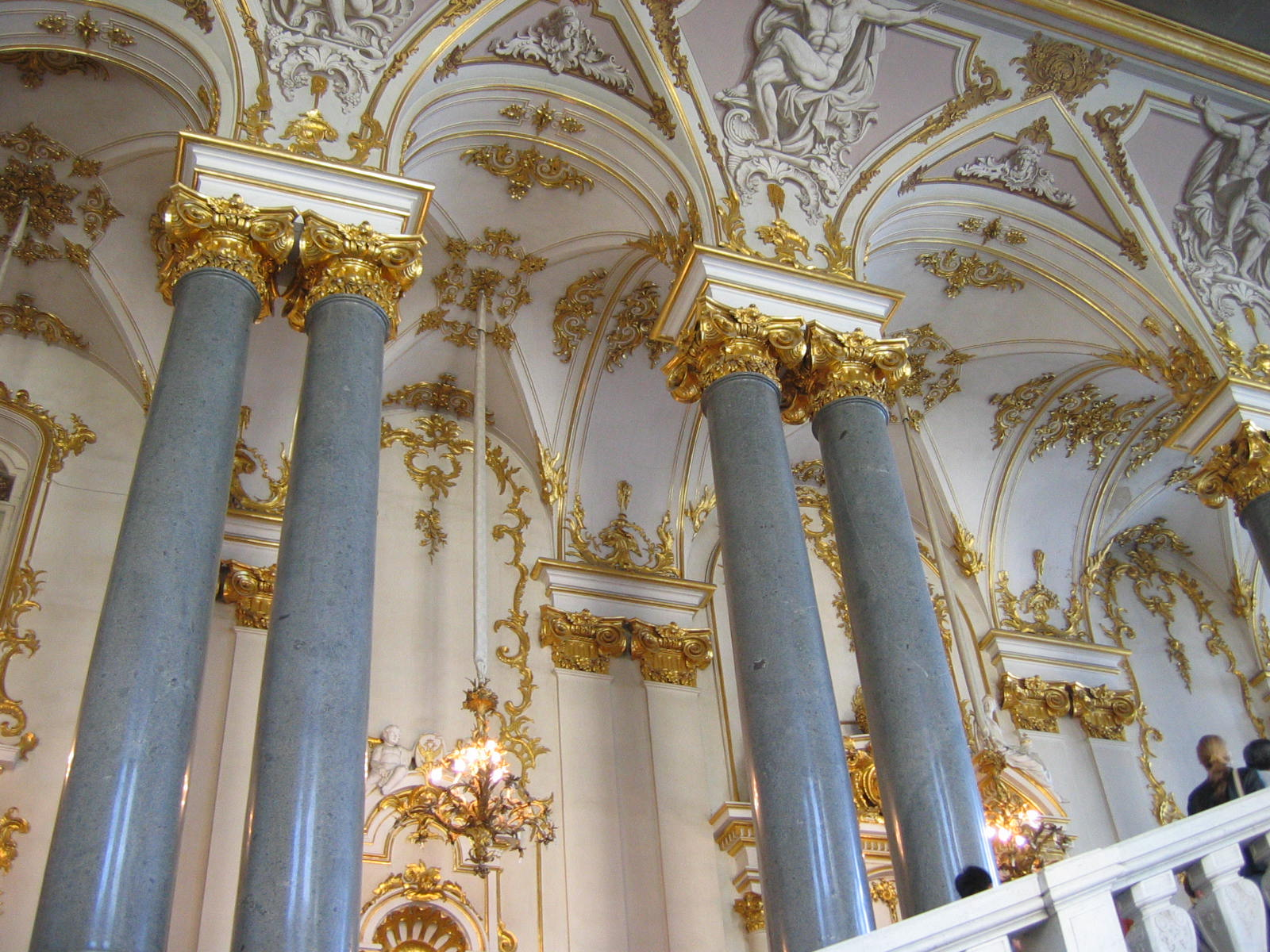

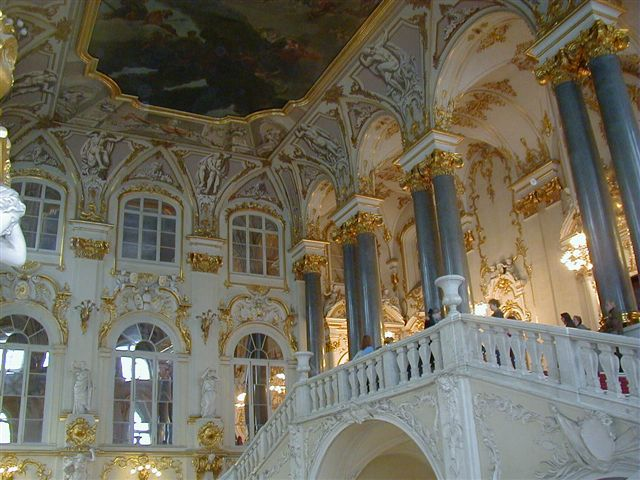

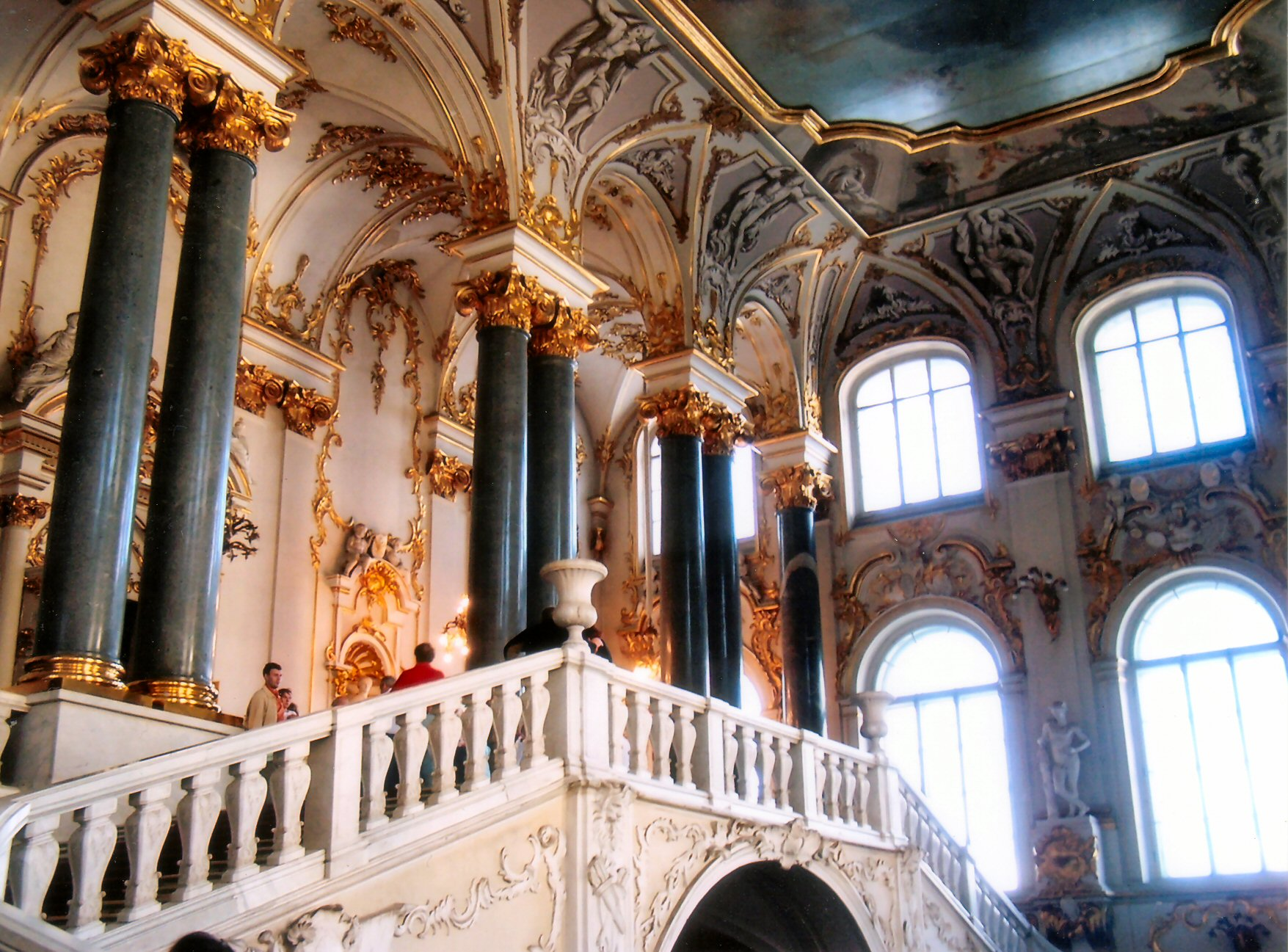

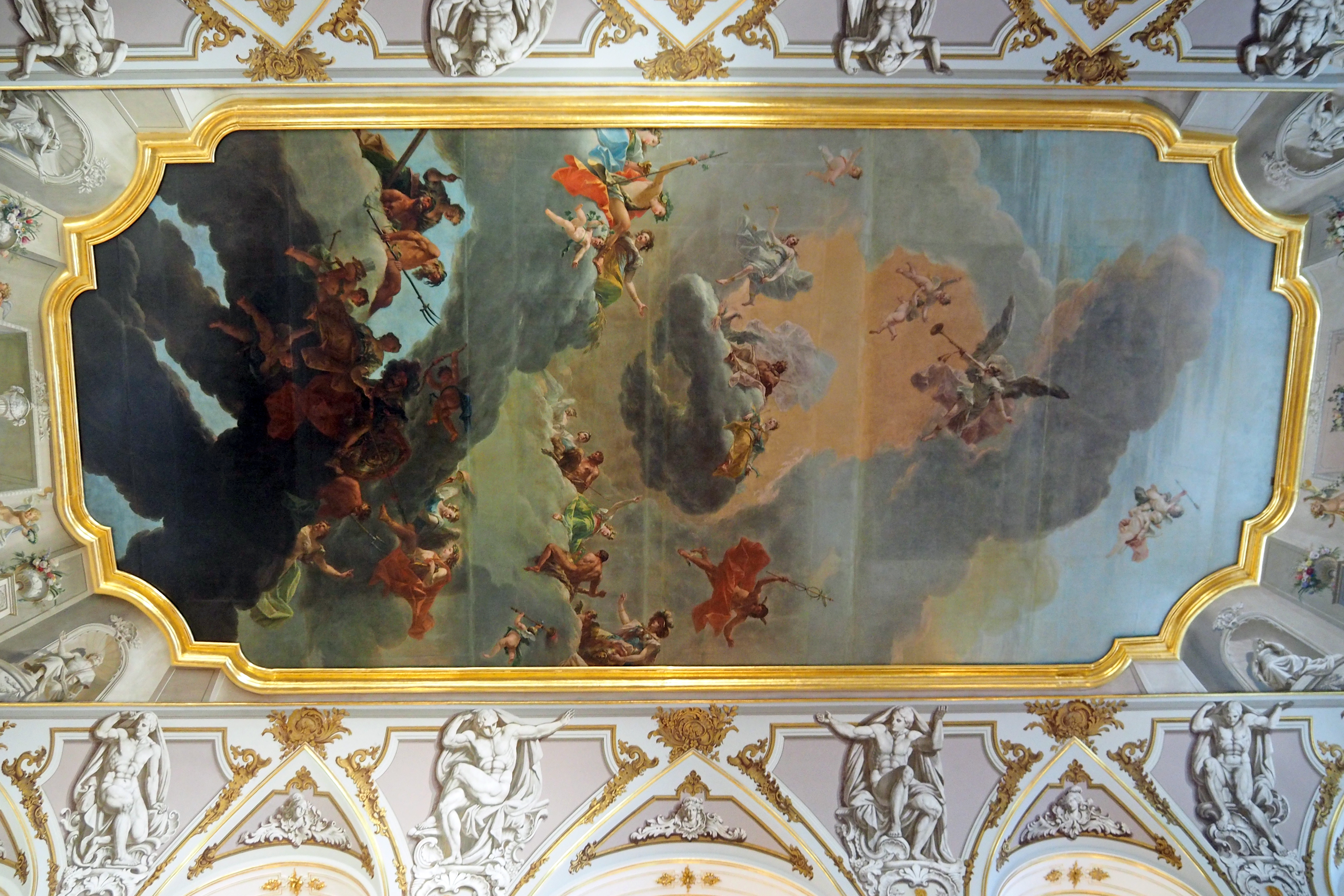

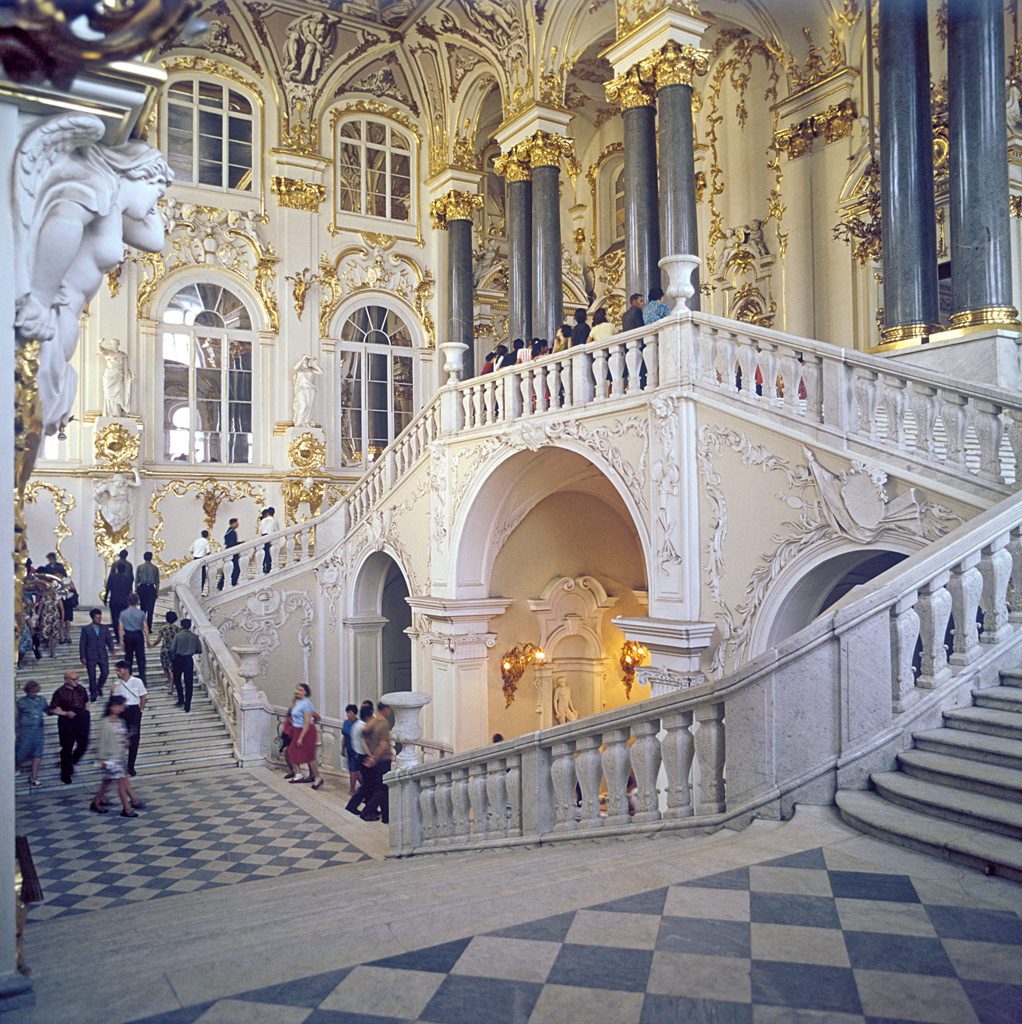

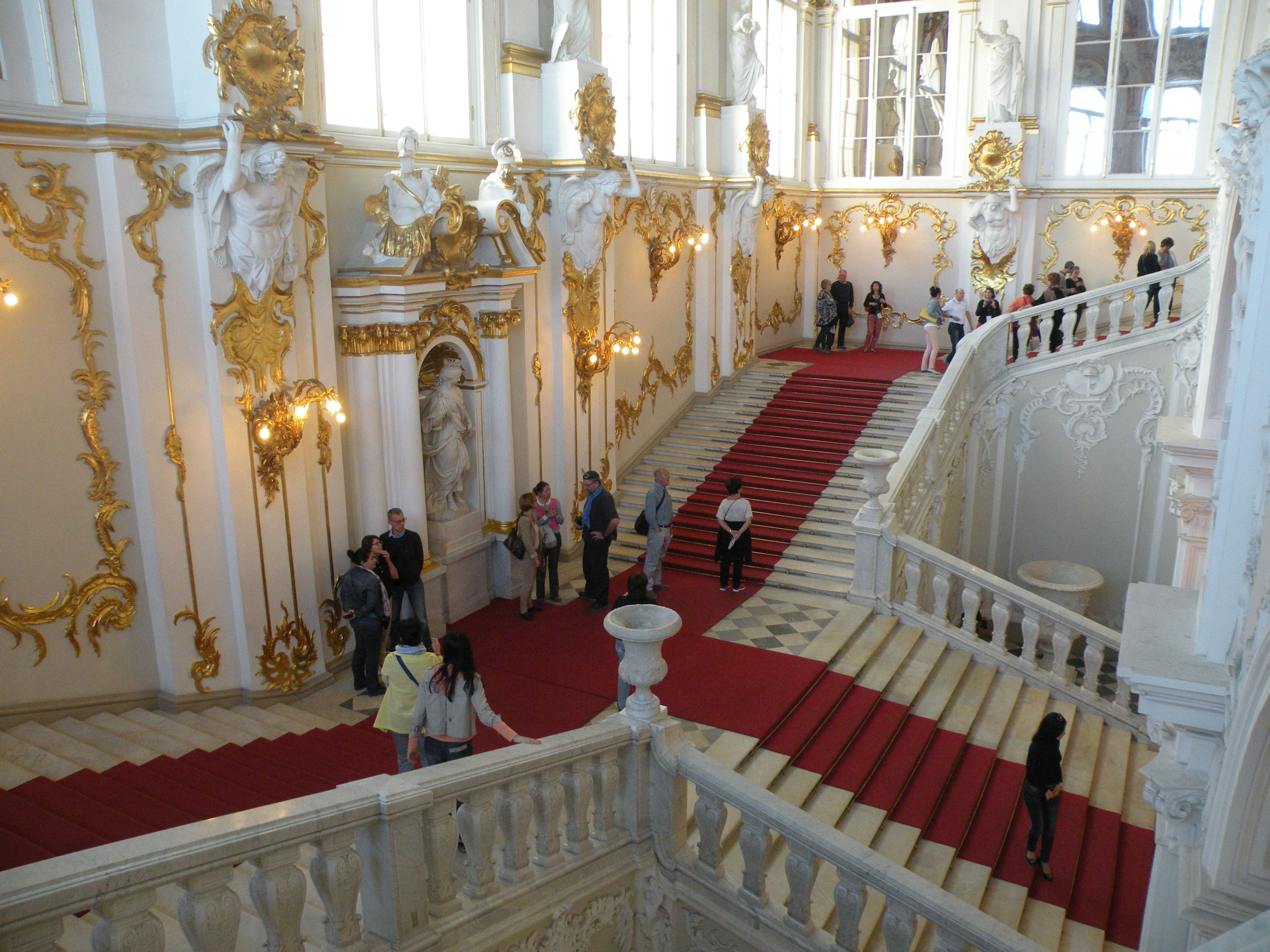
