= Small Throne Room of the Winter Palace =

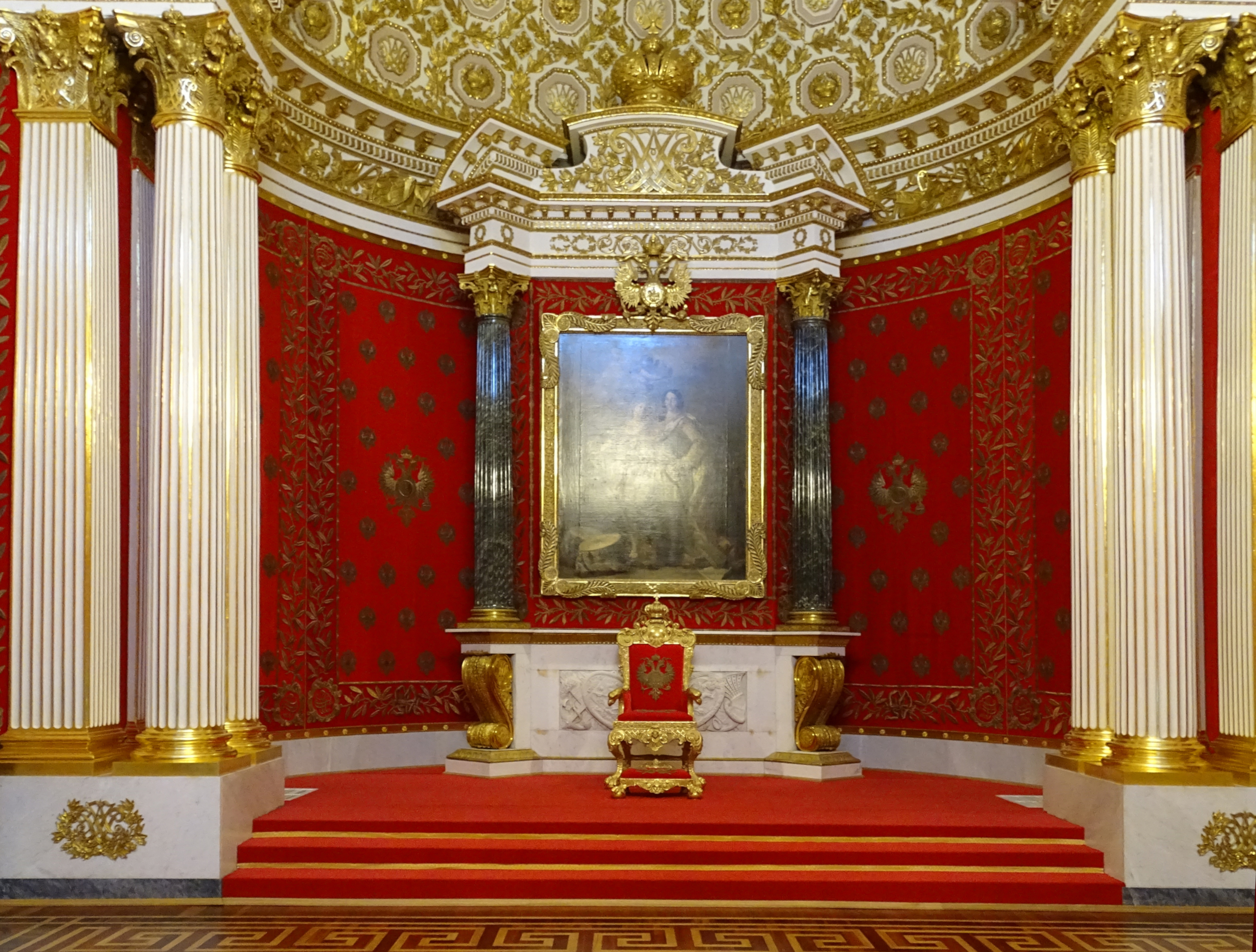
The Small Throne Room of the Winter Palace (2018)

Location of Small Throne Room, within the Winter Palace

The Small Throne Room of the Winter Palace, St Petersburg, also known as the Peter the Great Memorial Hall, was created for Tsar Nicholas I in 1833, by the architect Auguste de Montferrand. Following a fire in 1837, in which most of the palace was destroyed, the room was recreated exactly as it had been before by the architect Vasily Stasov.

Designed in a loose Baroque style, the room holds the throne recessed in an apse before a reredos, supported by two Corinthian columns of jasper, which contains a large canvas dedicated to Peter I with Minerva by Jacopo Amigoni. In the room proper above dado height the walls are lined with crimson velvet embellished with double-headed eagles of silver thread, above which is a shallow vaulted ceiling.

Set in the opposing lunettes beneath the vaulting are paintings depicting the Battle of Poltava and the Battle of Lesnaya by Pietro Scotti (1768-1837) and Barnabas Medici. However, the focal point of the room is the silver-gilt throne of 1731, made in London by the Anglo-French gold-and-silver-smith Nicholas Clausen. (Note: As to the history of the throne, the State Hermitage Museum here contradicts itself here)

Here, during the era of the Tsars, diplomats gathered on New Years Day to offer good wishes to the Tsar. Today, as part of the State Hermitage Museum, this room retains its original decoration.

== Architecture ==
The hall, covered by a cross vault, has a grandiose semi-circular niche (exedra), decorated as a triumphal arch. The soffit of the arch is decorated with a stucco-gilt ornament with the Latin monogram of Peter the Great. In the depth of the exedra, there is a throne place - a portal in the form of an edicule. The portal is flanked by monolithic columns of rivné jasper and topped by a broken pediment. On the white marble panels around the perimeter of the room are bronze gilt monograms of Peter the Great surrounded by laurel leaves. In the centre of each of the 10 velvet panels, 5.3 metres high, are large bronze gilt eagles. The composition of the panels is complemented by smaller eagles (244 in total), monograms, and an ornament containing laurel leaves, branches, berries and bows (a total of 7200 pieces).
