= Konstantin Ukhtomsky =

Russian painter

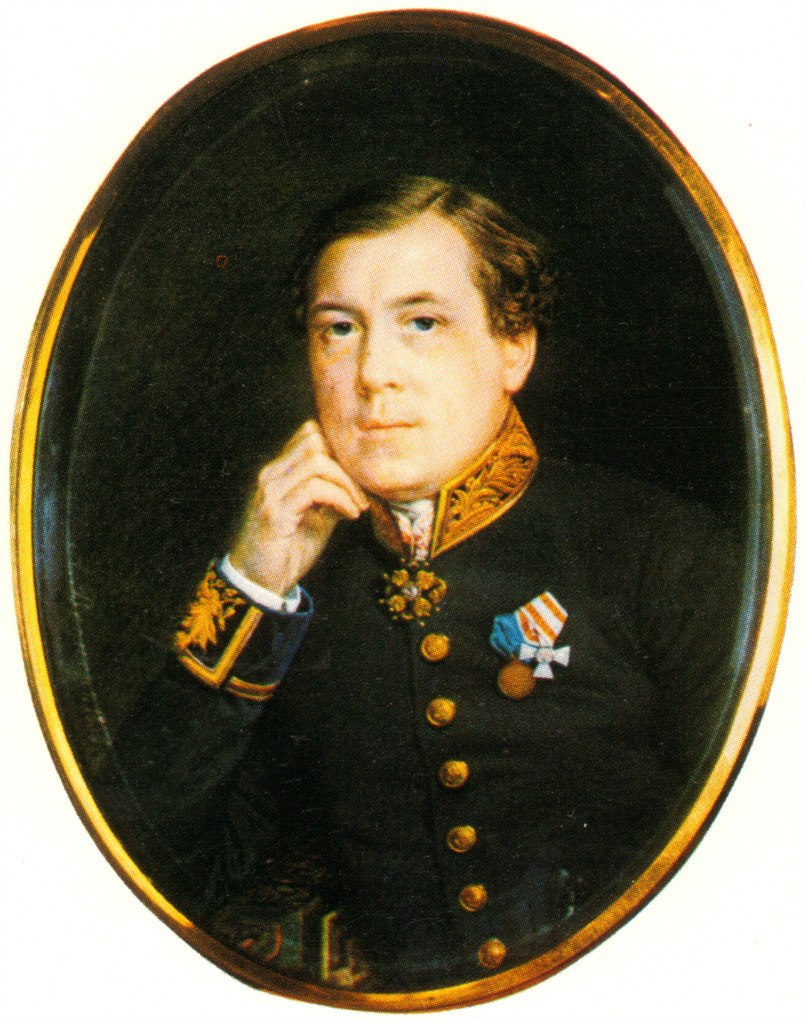
Konstantin Ukhtomsky; by Aleksandr Wegner (1858)

Konstantin Andreyevich Ukhtomsky (Russian: Константин Андреевич Ухтомский; (22 October 1818, Saint Petersburg - 26 August 1881, Saint Petersburg) was a Russian watercolour painter and architect, best known for his interior scenes of the Winter Palace and the New Hermitage.

== Life and work ==
His father was the master copper engraver, Andrei Ukhtomsky. He graduated from the Imperial Academy of Fine Arts in 1838, with the title of "Artist XIV Class" (architecture). That year and the following year, he was awarded silver medals for his watercolors. After that, he travelled abroad and produced numerous sketches that were made into watercolors upon his return.

In 1843, he was named an "Academician" for his "Project for a Wealthy Nobleman's House". From 1850 to 1859, he was the curator of the Academy's museum; succeeding his father in that post. In 1858, he was named a "Free Artist" for his views of the new building at the Hermitage Museum, following its opening to the public. That same year, he was awarded the Order of Saint Stanislaus. He was also involved in the construction of the New Michael Palace.

In his later years, he served as an architect at both the Ministry of the Imperial Court and the main engineering directorate of the Ministry of War. In 1872, he was granted the rank of State Councillor. He was presented with the Order of Saint Anna in 1877.

He was interred at the Smolensky Cemetery. Fifty of his watercolors may be seen at the Hermitage.

== Selected interiors ==
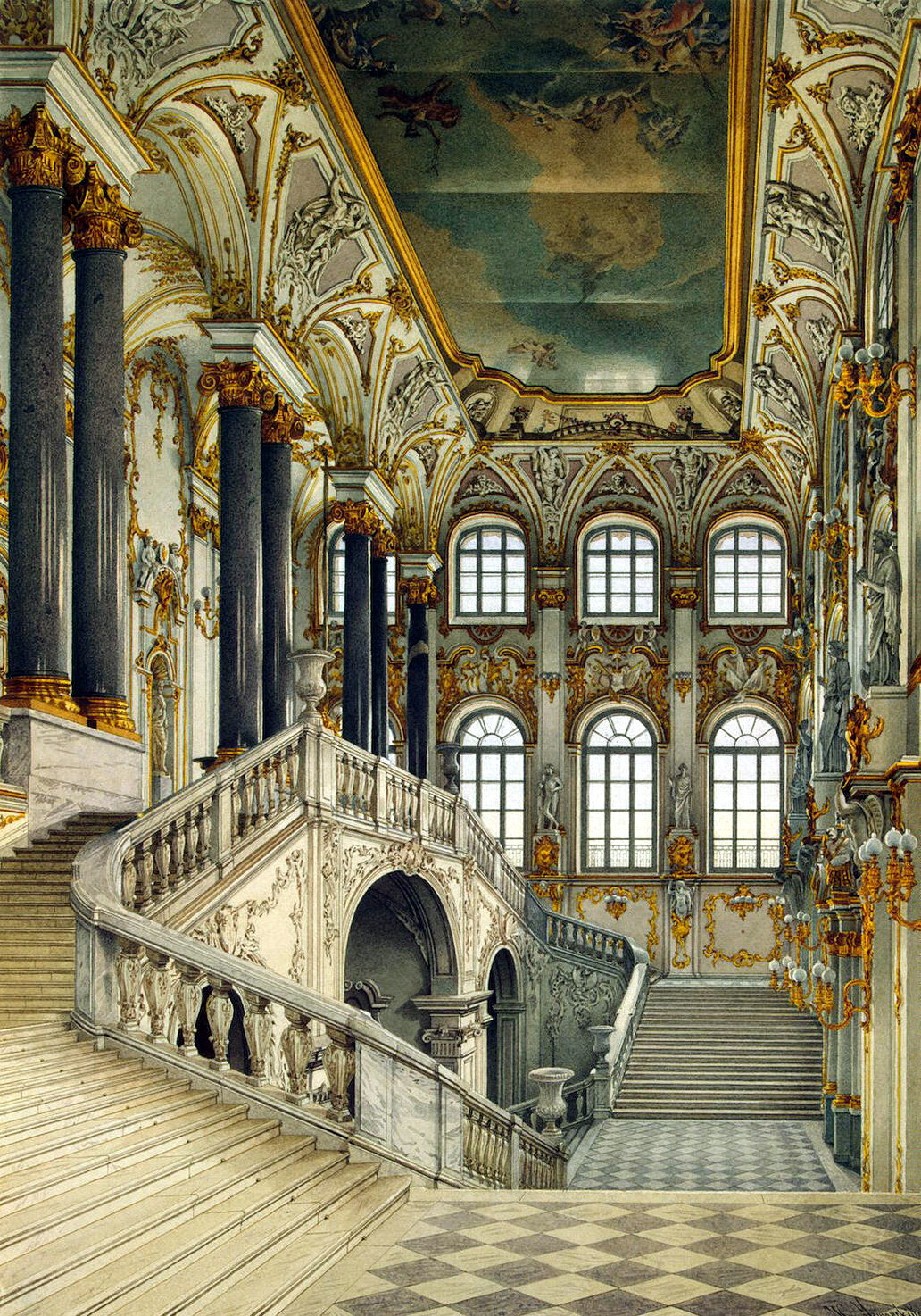
Jordan Staircase

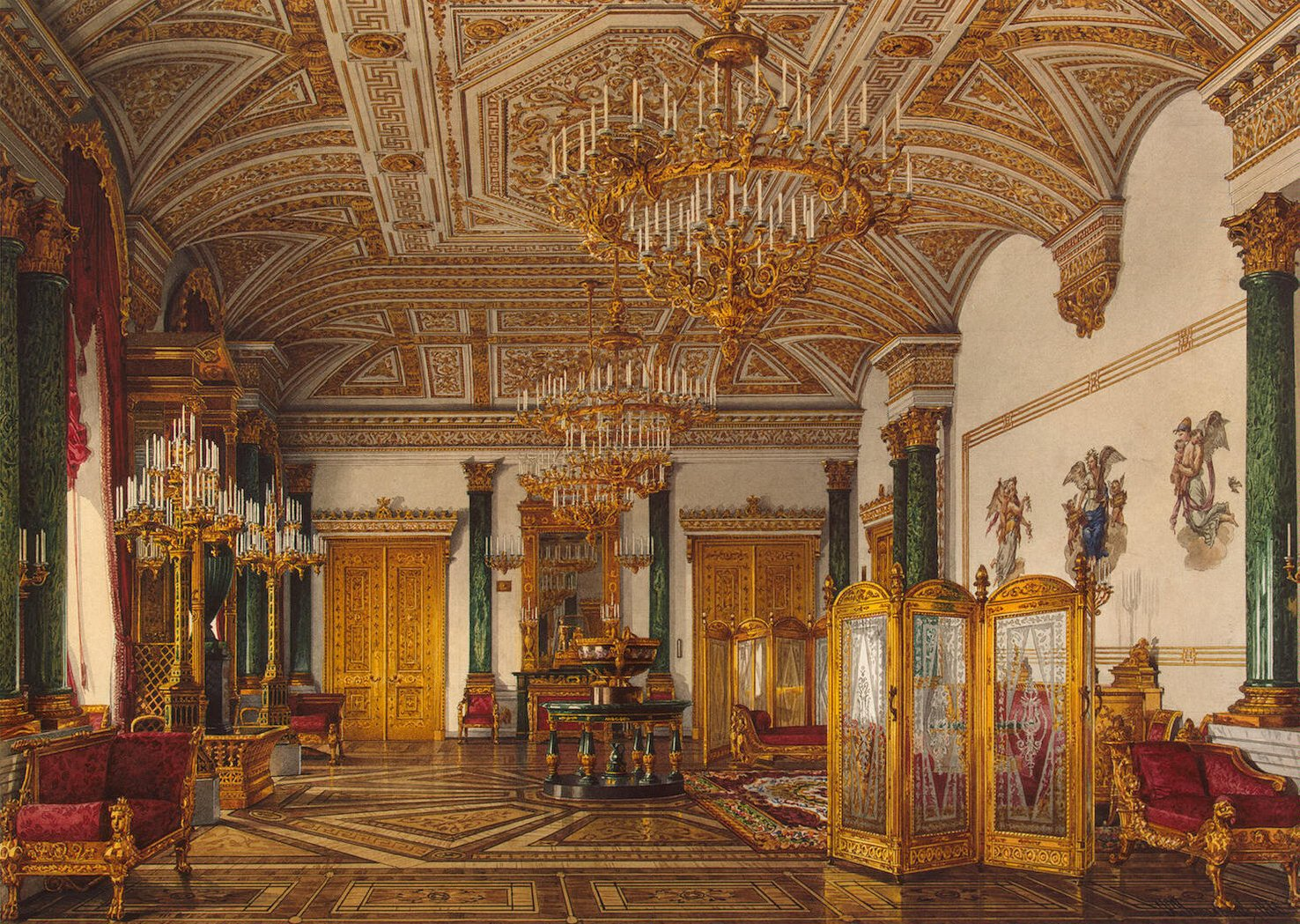
Malachite Room

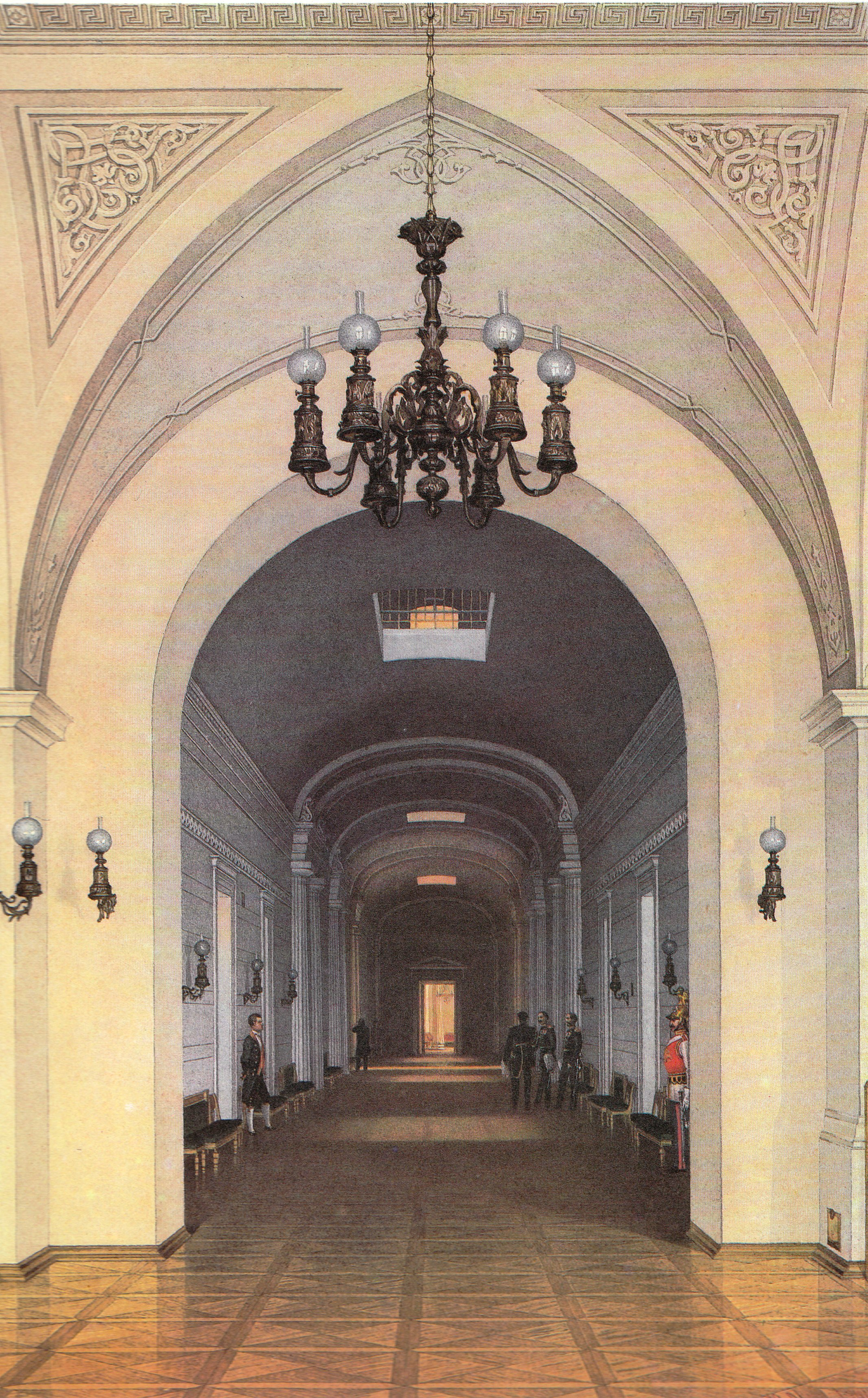
Corridor in the Winter Palace

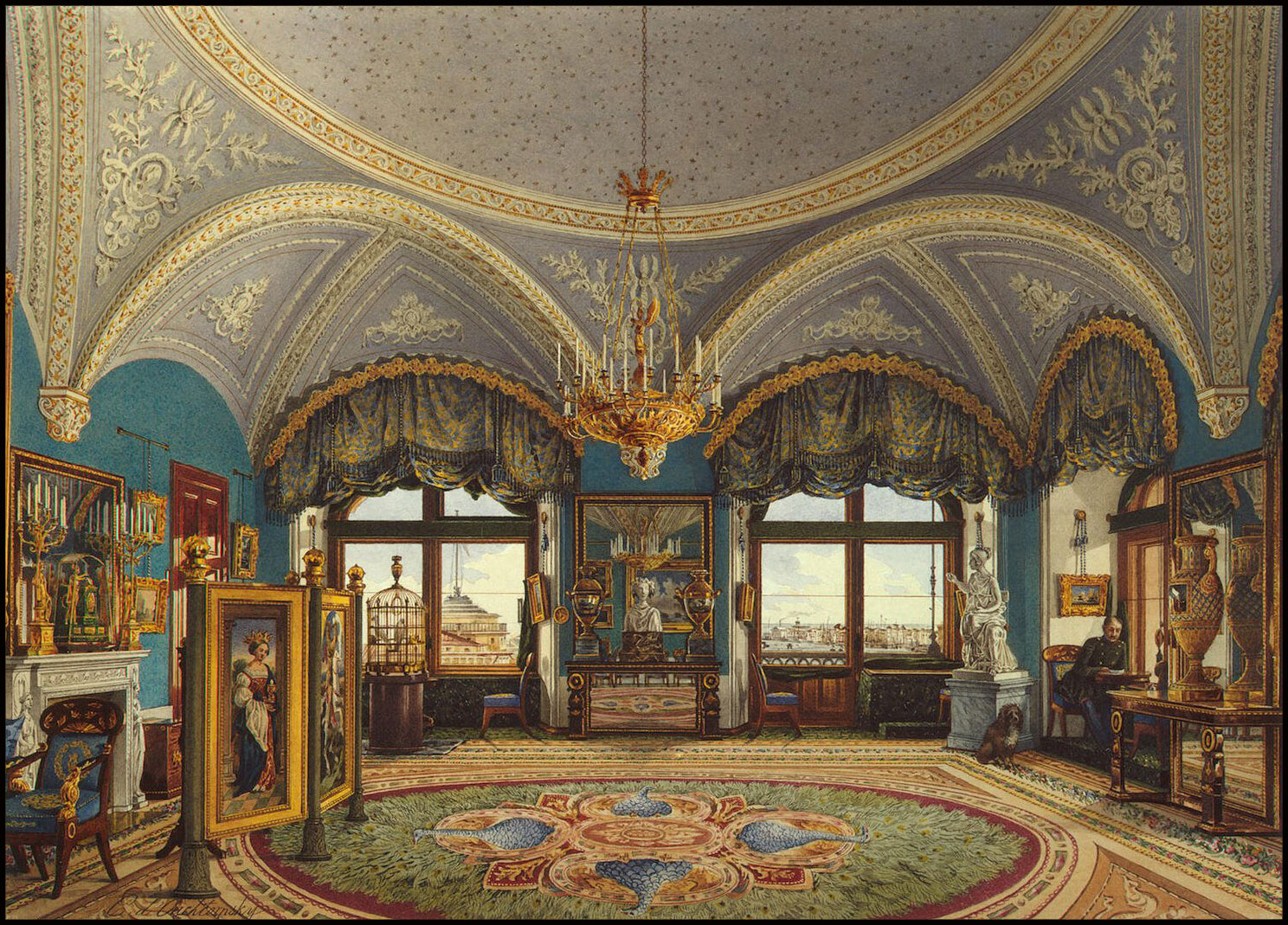
Drawing Room of Tsar Nicholas I

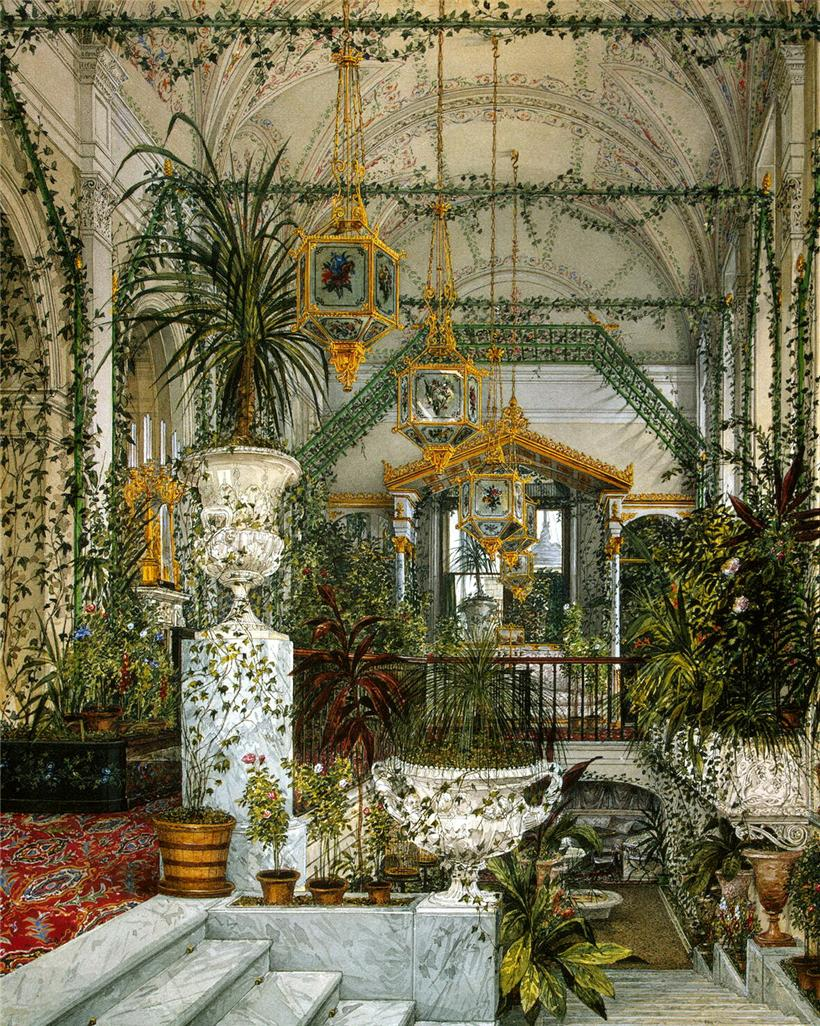
Winter Garden of Tsarina Alexandra
