= St George's Hall and Apollo Room of the Winter Palace =

Throne room of the Tsars of Russia

Coordinates: 59.941°N 30.3151°E

St George's Hall, the principal throne room of the Tsars of Russia, watercolour by Konstantin Ukhtomsky (1862).

St George's Hall (13), 1906: The throne draped and flanked by the Imperial Romanov regalia, the Imperial family (upper left of the image) and the First State Duma await the arrival of the Tsar.

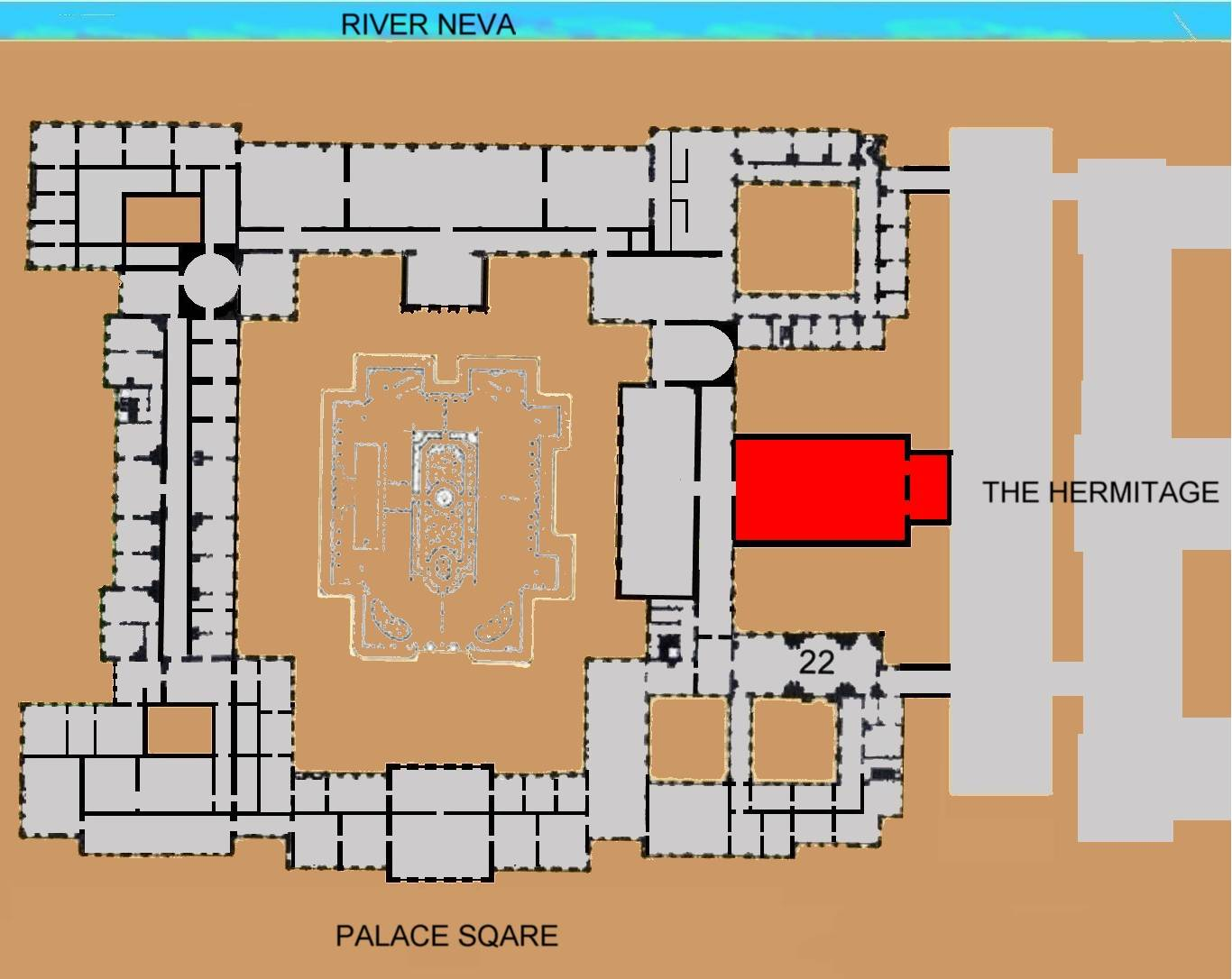
Location of st George's Hall and the Apollo Room within the palace.

St George's Hall (also referred to as the Great Throne Room) is one of the largest state rooms in the Winter Palace, St Petersburg. It is located on the eastern side of the palace, and connected to The Hermitage by the smaller Apollo Room.

== History ==
The colourful, neoclassical interior design of this great hall, executed by Giacomo Quarenghi between 1787 and 1795, was lost in the fire of 1837 which gutted much of the palace's interior. Following the fire, Russian architect Vasily Stasov was commissioned to oversee the restoration and rebuilding of the palace. While he retained the architectural features dictated by the exterior of the palace, he completely redesigned the interior in a more simple classical style. He replaced the columns of polychrome marble with those of white cararra marble. The original painted ceilings, depicting allegorical scenes, had been entirely lost in the fire, allowing Stasov to introduce a plain ceiling with gilded embellishments.

St George's Hall, which served as the palace's principal throne room, was the scene of many of the most formal ceremonies of the Imperial court. Most historically, it was the setting of the opening of the First State Duma by Nicholas II, in 1906. The Tsar was forced to agree to the establishment of a Duma as a concession to his people in an attempt to avert revolution. However, the Imperial family saw it as "the end of Russian autocracy".

It was the first time that ordinary Russians had been admitted to the palace in any number—a surreal experience for both the peasants and the Imperial family. The Tsar's sister, who stood with the Imperial family on the steps of the throne, recalled of the masses of ordinary Russians who packed the hall: "I went with my mother to the first Duma. I remember the large group of deputies from among peasants and factory people. The peasants looked sullen. But the workmen were worse: they looked as though they hated us. I remember the distress in Alicky's eyes." Minister of the Court Count Vladimir Frederiks commented, "The Deputies, they give one the impression of a gang of criminals who are only waiting for the signal to throw themselves upon the ministers and cut their throats. I will never again set foot among those people." The Dowager Empress noticed "incomprehensible hatred."

== Current status ==
Located behind the throne is the small Apollo Room. This anteroom is in fact the upper floor of a bridge linking the palace to the Hermitage. This room has a caisson ceiling adorned with stucco work. Today, as part of the State Hermitage Museum, this room retains the decorative scheme created by Stasov.

== Gallery ==
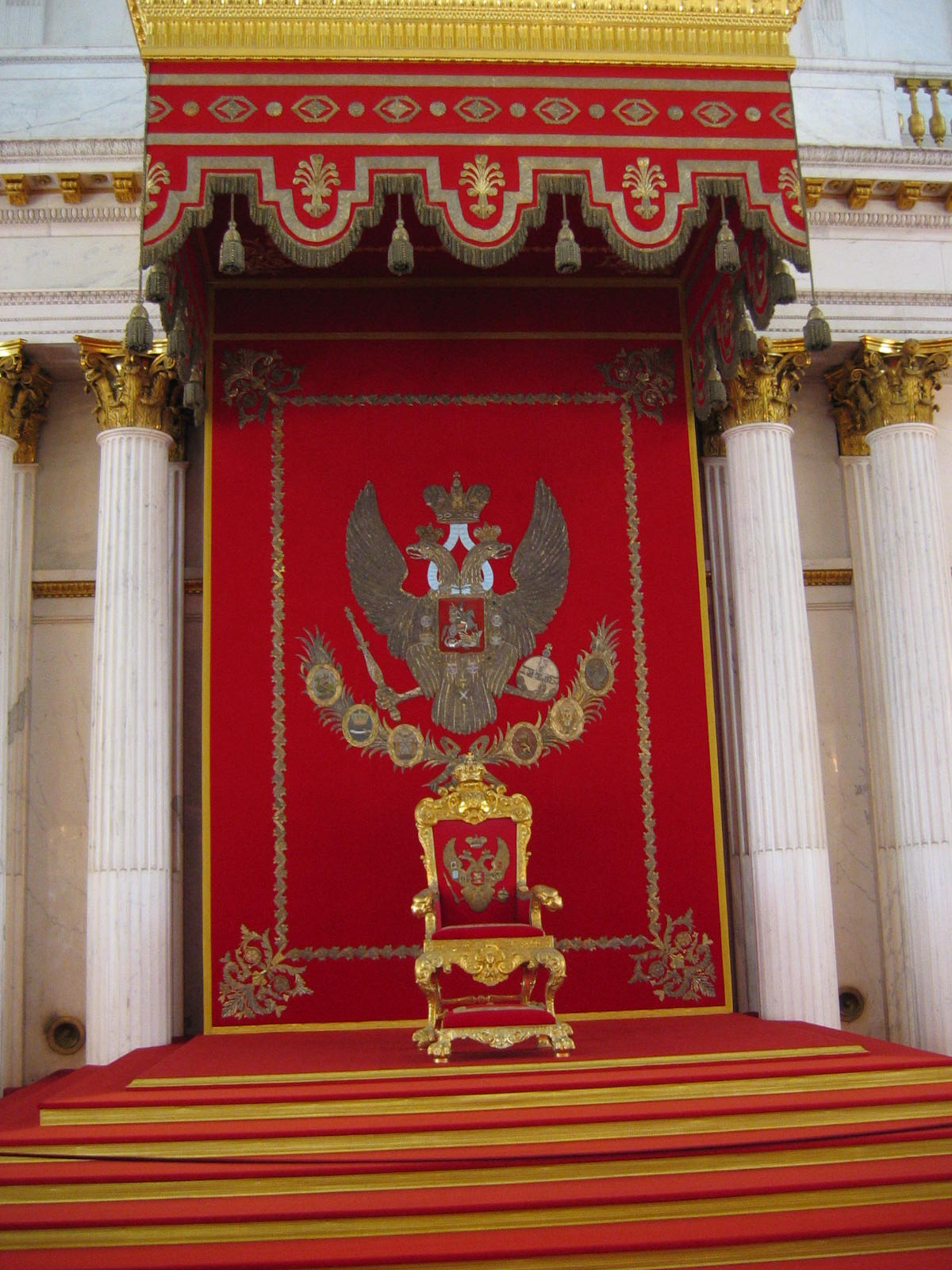
The Throne (2005)

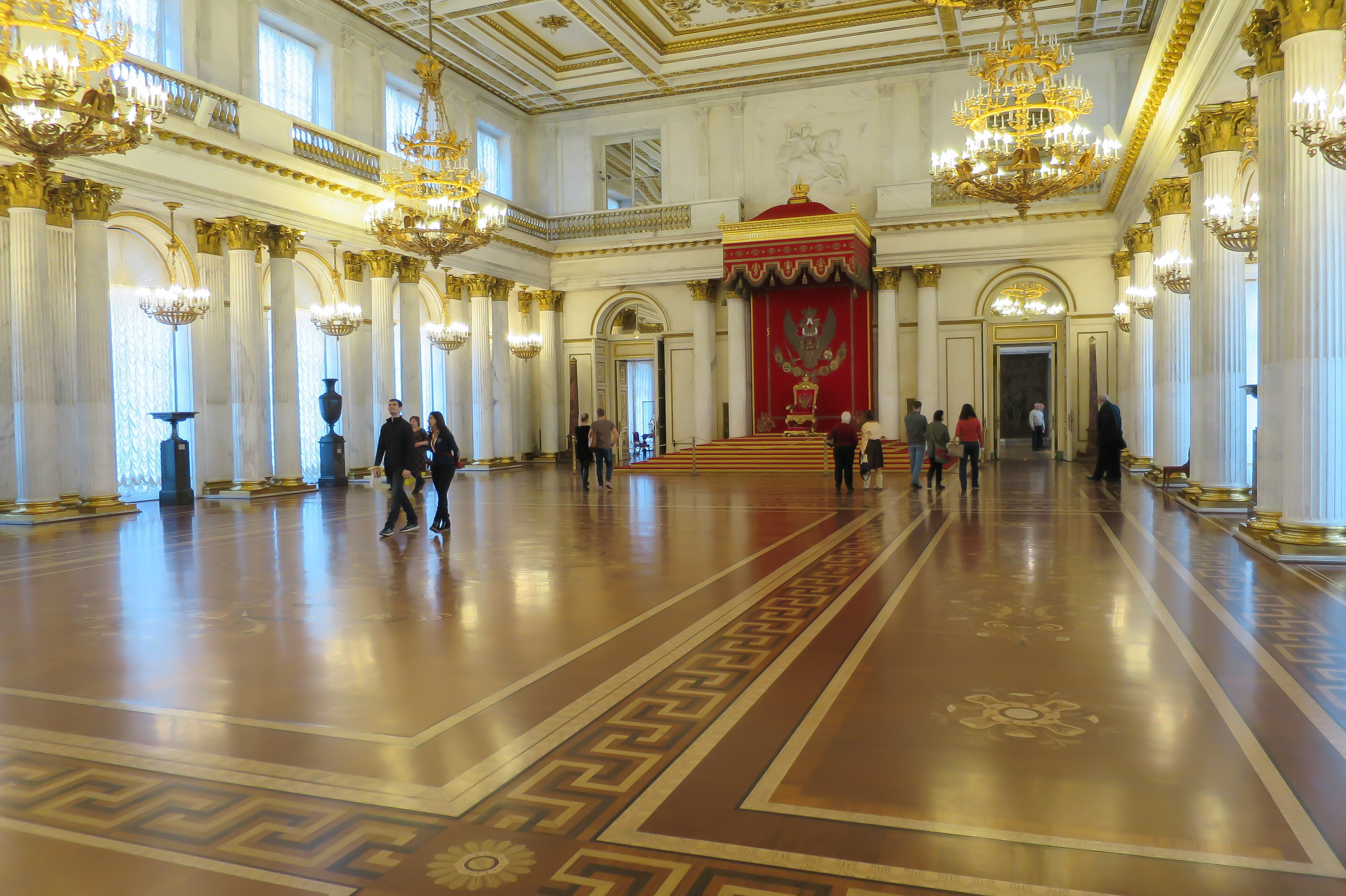
The hall, 2015

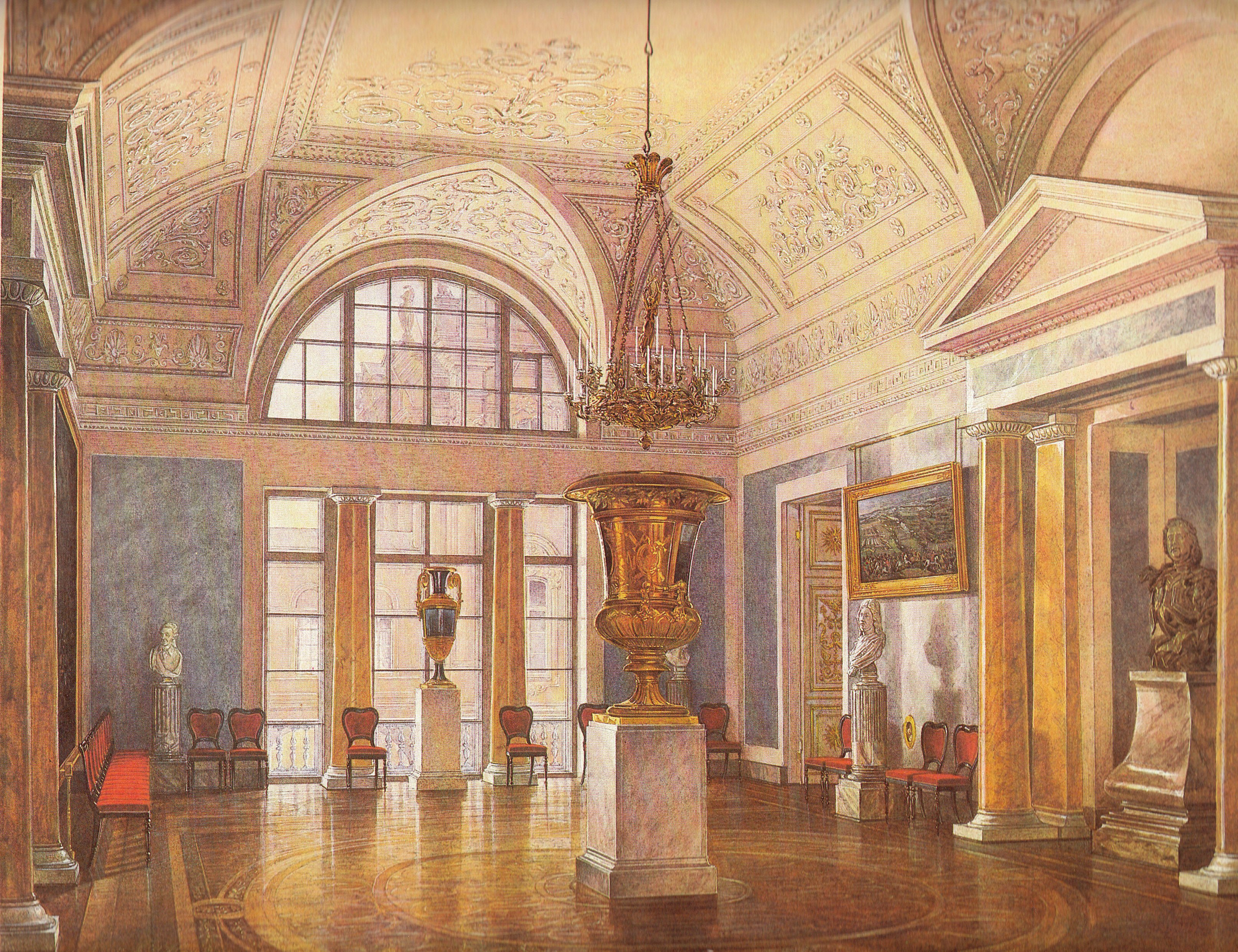
The Apollo Room, by Eduard Hau (1862)
