= Winter Palace =

Former imperial palace in Saint Petersburg, Russia

Coordinates: 59.9404°N 30.3139°E

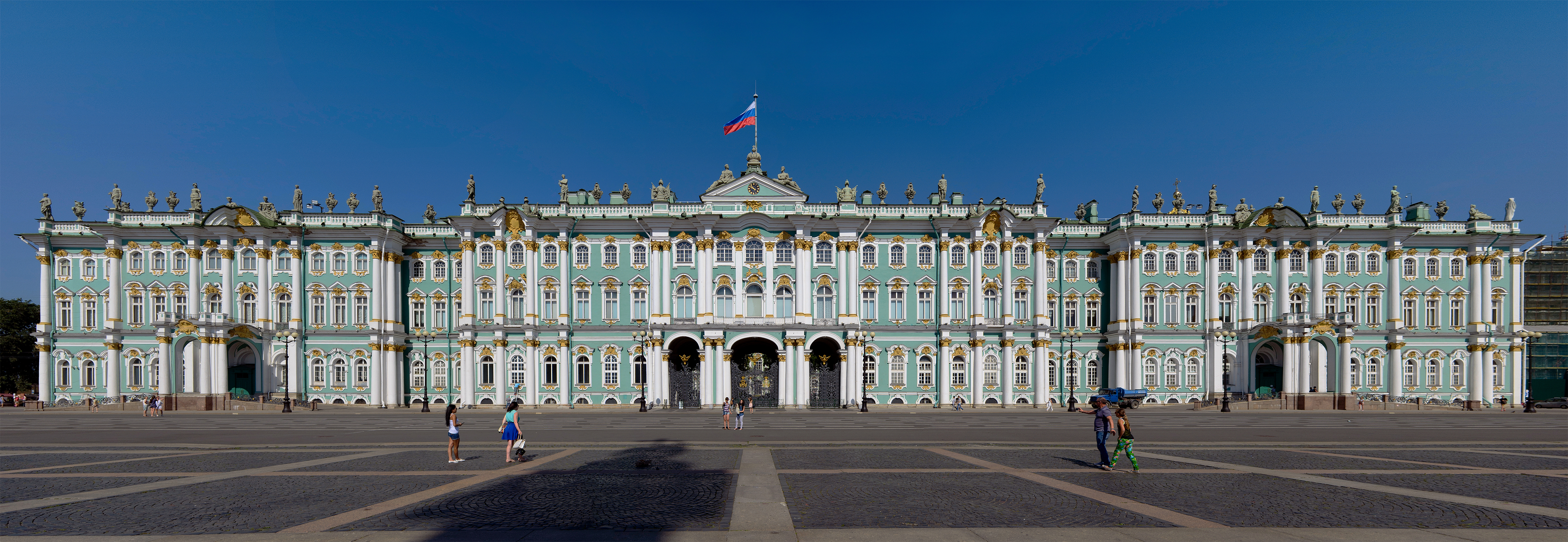
The Winter Palace, from Palace Square

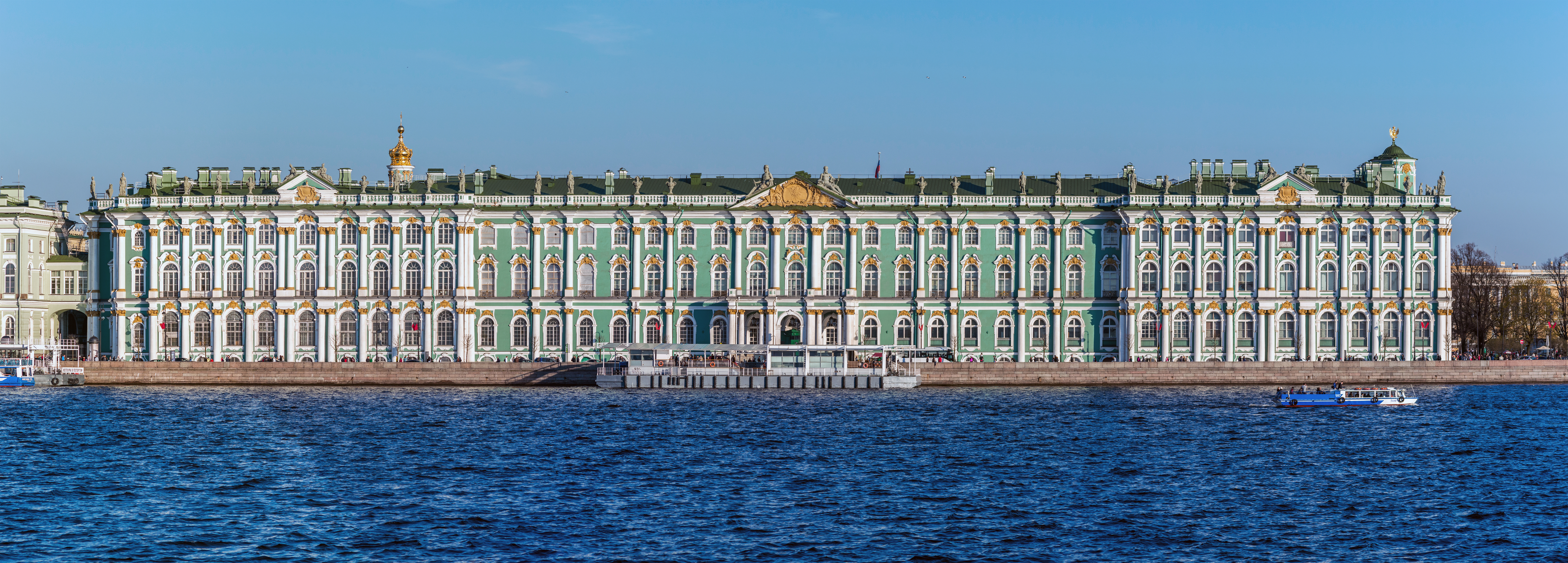
The Winter Palace, from Palace Embankment

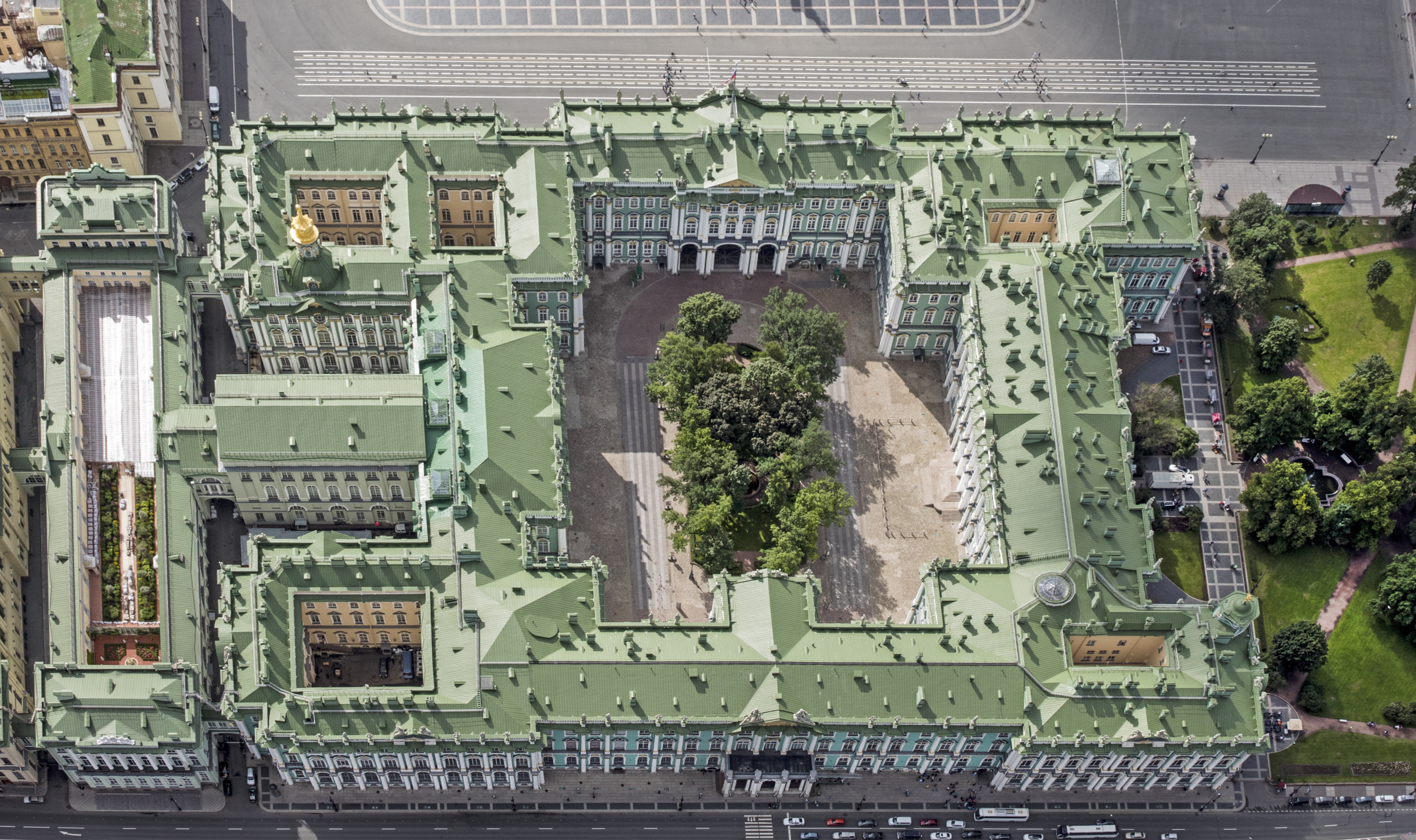
The Winter Palace, from above

The Winter Palace is a palace in Saint Petersburg that served as the official residence of the House of Romanov, the emperors of Russia, from 1732 to 1917. The palace and its precincts now house the Hermitage Museum. The floor area is 233,345 square metres (it has been calculated that the palace contains 1,886 doors, 1,945 windows, 1,500 rooms and 117 staircases). The total area of the Winter Palace is 14.2 hectares (approximately 1.52 million square feet). Situated between Palace Embankment and Palace Square, adjacent to the site of Peter the Great's original Winter Palace, the present and fourth Winter Palace was built and altered almost continuously between the late 1730s and 1837, when it was severely damaged by fire and immediately rebuilt. The storming of the palace in 1917, as depicted in Soviet art and in Sergei Eisenstein's 1928 film October, became a symbol of the October Revolution.

The emperors constructed their palaces on a monumental scale that aimed to reflect the might and power of Imperial Russia. From the palace, the tsars ruled over 22,800,000 square kilometers (8,800,000 sq mi) (almost 1/6 of the Earth's landmass) and 125 million subjects by the end of the 19th century. Several architects participated in designing the Winter Palace—most notably the Italian Bartolomeo Rastrelli (1700–1771)—in what became known as the Elizabethan Baroque style. The green-and-white palace has the overall shape of an elongated rectangle, and its principal façade is 215 metres (705 ft) long and 30 m (98 ft) high. Following a serious fire, the palace's rebuilding of 1837 left the exterior unchanged, but large parts of the interior were redesigned in a variety of tastes and styles, leading the palace to be described as a "19th-century palace inspired by a model in Rococo style".

In 1905, the Bloody Sunday events occurred when demonstrators marched toward the Winter Palace, but by this time the Imperial Family had chosen to live in the more secure and secluded Alexander Palace at Tsarskoe Selo (lit. 'imperial village'), and returned to the Winter Palace only for formal and state occasions. Following the February Revolution of 1917, the palace operated for a short time as the seat of the Russian Provisional Government, ultimately led by Alexander Kerensky. Later that same year a detachment of Red Guard soldiers and sailors stormed the palace—a defining moment in the birth of the Soviet state, overthrowing the Provisional Government.

== Peter the Great's Winter Palace (1711–1753) ==
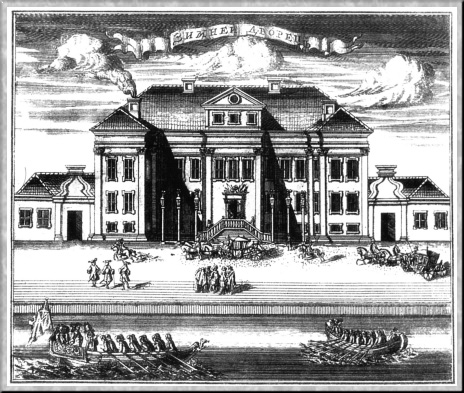
The first Winter Palace, designed in 1711 for Peter the Great, by Domenico Trezzini who, 16 years later, was to design the third Winter Palace

Upon returning from his Grand Embassy in 1698, Peter I of Russia embarked on a policy of Westernization and expansion that was to transform the Tsardom of Russia into the Russian Empire and a major European power. This policy was manifested in bricks and mortar by the creation of a new city, Saint Petersburg, in 1703. The culture and design of the new city was intended as a conscious rejection of traditional Byzantine-influenced Russian architecture, such as the then-fashionable Naryshkin Baroque, in favour of the classically inspired architecture prevailing in the great cities of Europe. The Tsar intended that his new city would be designed in a Flemish renaissance style, later known as Petrine Baroque, and this was the style he selected for his new palace in the city. The first Royal residence on the site had been a humble log cabin then known as the Domik Petra I, built in 1704, which faced the River Neva. In 1711, it was transported to the Petrovskaya Naberezhnaya, where it still stands. With the site cleared, the Tsar then embarked on the building of a larger house between 1711 and 1712. This house, today referred to as The First Winter Palace, was designed by Domenico Trezzini.

The 18th century was a period of great development in European royal architecture, as the need for a fortified residence gradually lessened. This process, which had begun in the late 16th century, accelerated and great classical palaces quickly replaced fortified castles throughout the more powerful European countries. One of the earliest and most notable examples was Louis XIV's Versailles. Largely completed by 1710, Versailles—with its size and splendour—heightened rivalry amongst the sovereigns of Europe. Peter the Great of Russia, keen to promote all western concepts, wished to have a modern palace like his fellow sovereigns. However, unlike some of his successors, Peter I never aspired to rival Versailles.

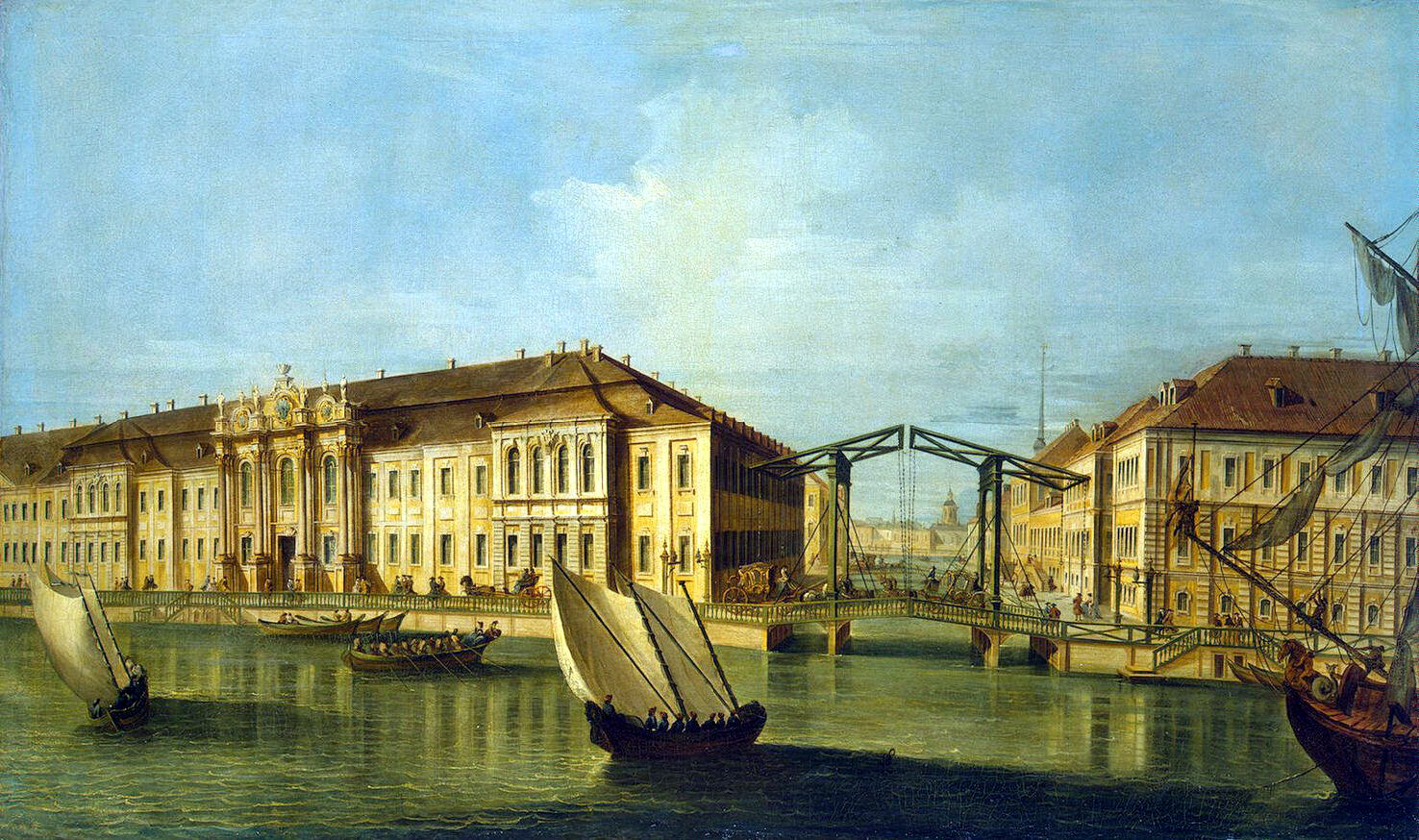
The third Winter Palace of 1727. Designed by Domenico Trezzini it incorporated the second Winter Palace of 1721 by Georg Johann Mattarnovi as one of its terminating pavilions, c. 1732

The first Winter Palace was a modest building of two main floors under a slate roof. It seems that Peter soon tired of the first palace, for in 1721 the second version of the Winter Palace was built under the direction of architect Georg Johann Mattarnovi. Mattarnovi's palace, though still very modest compared to royal palaces in other European capitals, was on two floors above a rusticated ground floor, with a central projection underneath a pediment supported by columns. It was here that Peter the Great died in 1725.

The Winter Palace was not the only palace in the unfinished city, or even the most splendid, as Peter had ordered his nobles to construct stone built residences and to spend half the year there. This was an unpopular command; Saint Petersburg was founded upon a swamp, with little sunlight, and it was said only cabbages and turnips would grow there. It was forbidden to fell trees for fuel, so hot water was permitted just once a week. Only Peter's second wife, Empress Catherine, pretended to enjoy life in the new city.

As a result of pressed slave labour from all over the Empire, work on the city progressed quickly. It has been estimated that 200,000 people died in twenty years while building the city. A diplomat of the time, who described the city as "a heap of villages linked together, like some plantation in the West Indies", just a few years later called it "a wonder of the world, considering its magnificent palaces". Some of these new palaces in Peter's beloved Flemish Baroque style, such as the Kikin Hall and the Menshikov Palace, still stand.

== The palace, 1725–1855 ==
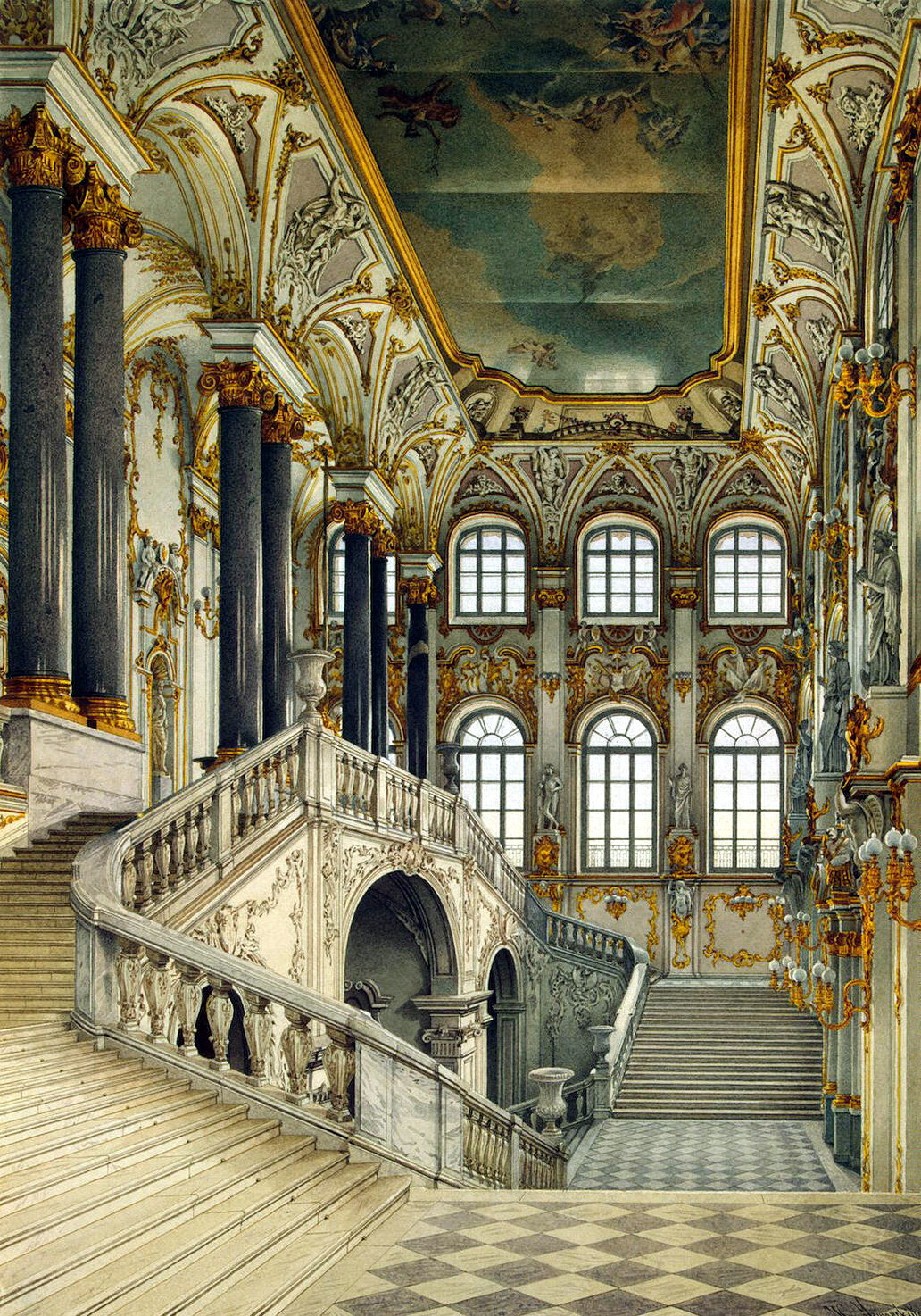
The principal or "Jordan Staircase", (8 on the plan below), so-called because on the Feast of the Epiphany the Tsar descended this Imperial staircase in state for the ceremony of the "Blessing of the Waters". It is one of the few parts of the palace retaining Rastrelli's 18th century rococo style. The massive grey granite columns were, however, added in the mid-19th century. Painting by Konstantin Ukhtomsky.

On Peter the Great's death in 1725, the city of Saint Petersburg was still far from being the centre of western culture and civilization that he had envisioned. Many of the aristocrats who had been compelled by the Tsar to inhabit Saint Petersburg left. Wolves roamed the squares at night while bands of discontented pressed serfs, imported to build the Tsar's new city and Baltic fleet, frequently rebelled.

Peter I was succeeded by his widow, Catherine I, who reigned until her death in 1727. She in turn was succeeded by Peter I's grandson Peter II, who in 1727 had Mattarnovy's palace greatly enlarged by the architect Domenico Trezzini. Trezzini, who had designed the Summer Palace in 1711, was one of the greatest exponents of the Petrine Baroque style, now completely redesigned and expanded Mattarnovy's existing Winter Palace to such an extent that Mattarnovy's entire palace became merely one of the two terminating pavilions of the new, and third, Winter Palace. The third palace, like the second, was in the Petrine Baroque style.

In 1728, shortly after the third palace was completed, the Imperial Court left Saint Petersburg for Moscow, and the Winter Palace lost its status as the principal imperial residence. Moscow had once again been designated the capital city, a status which had been granted to Saint Petersburg in 1713. Following the death of Peter II in 1730 the throne passed to a niece of Peter I, Anna Ivanovna, Duchess of Courland.

=== Anna (1730–1740) ===
The new Empress cared more for Saint Petersburg than her immediate predecessors; she re-established the Imperial court at the Winter Palace, and in 1732 Saint Petersburg again officially replaced Moscow as Russia's capital, a position it was to hold until 1918.

Ignoring the third Winter Palace, the Empress on her return to Saint Petersburg took up residence at the neighbouring Apraksin Palace. In 1732, the Tsaritsa commissioned the Italian architect Francesco Bartolomeo Rastrelli to completely rebuild and extend the Apraksin Palace, incorporating other neighbouring houses. Thus, the core of the fourth and final Winter Palace is not the palace of Peter the Great, but the palace of Admiral General Fyodor Matveyevich Apraksin.

The Empress Anna, though unpopular and considered "dull, coarse, fat, harsh and spiteful", was keen to introduce a more civilized and cultured air to her court. She designed new liveries for her servants and, on her orders, mead and vodka were replaced with champagne and Burgundy. She instructed the Russian nobility to replace their plain furniture with that of mahogany and ebony, while her own tastes in interior decoration ran to a dressing table of solid gold and an "easing stool" of silver, studded with rubies. It was against such a backdrop of magnificence and extravagance that she gave her first ball in the newly completed gallery at the Winter Palace, which, in the middle of the Russian winter, resembled an orange grove. This, the fourth version of the Winter Palace, was to be an ongoing project for the architect Rastrelli throughout the reign of the Empress Anna.

=== Elizabeth (1741–1762) ===
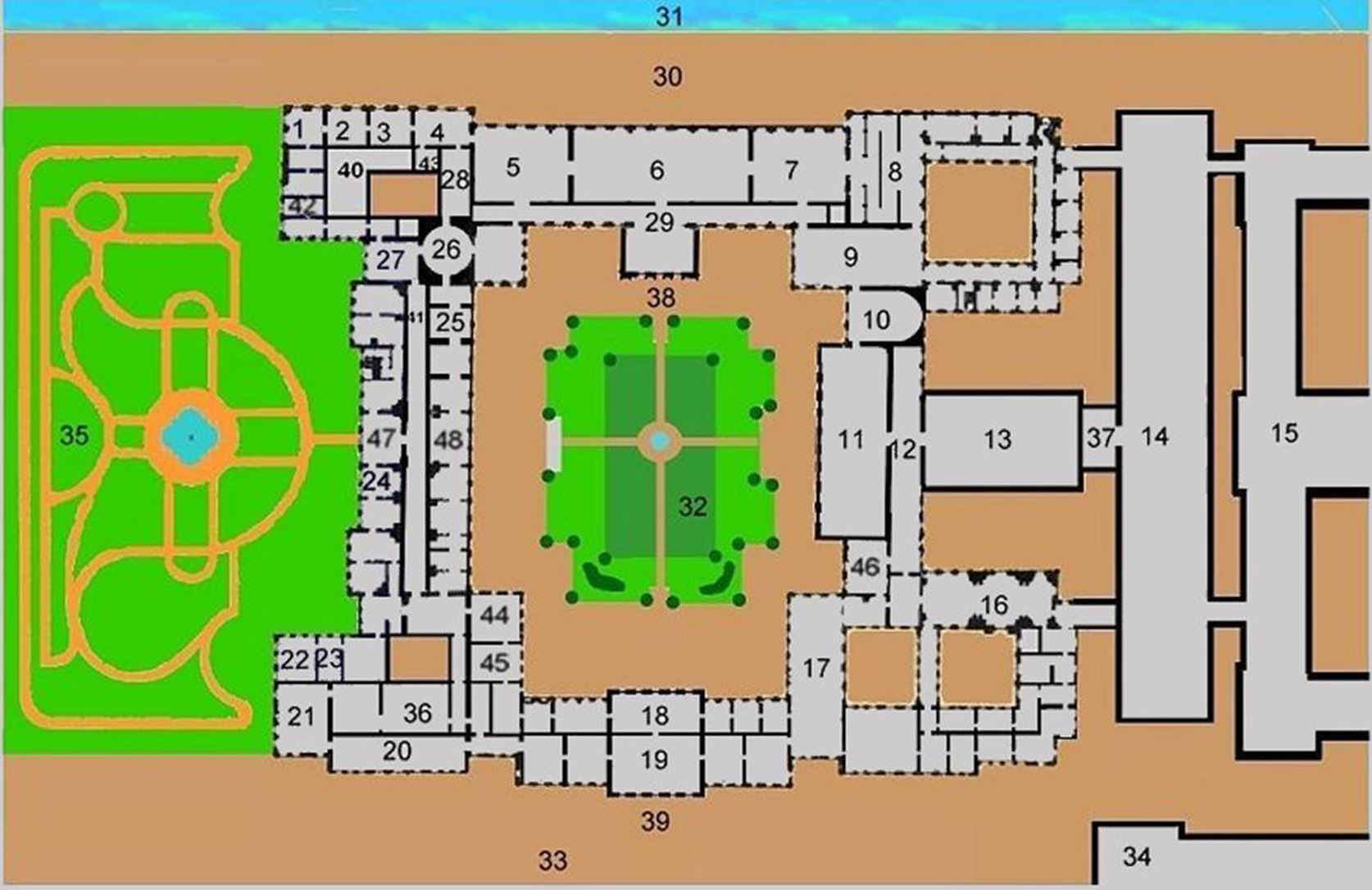
Unscaled plan of the 1st floor of the Winter Palace as it appears today, the fourth palace on the site. The numbers in this key are referred to throughout the article—click on numbers for images, pages and further details.

The infant Tsar Ivan VI, succeeding Anna in 1740, was soon deposed in a bloodless coup d'état by Grand Duchess Elizabeth, a daughter of Peter the Great. The new Empress Elizabeth, whose main residence was the Summer Palace, led the court at the Winter Palace to be described later by the Russian historian Vasily Klyuchevsky as a place of "gilded squalor".

During the reign of Elizabeth, Rastrelli, still working to his original plan, devised an entirely new scheme in 1753, on a colossal scale—the present Winter Palace. The expedited completion of the palace became a matter of honour to the Empress, who regarded the palace as a symbol of national prestige. Work on the building continued throughout the year, even in the severest months of the winter. The deprivation to both the Russian people and the army caused by the ongoing Seven Years' War were not permitted to hinder the progress. 859,555 rubles had been allocated to the project, a sum raised by a tax on state-owned taverns. Though the labourers earned a monthly wage of just one ruble, the cost of the project exceeded the budget, so much so that work ceased due to lack of resources despite the Empress' obsessive desire for rapid completion. Ultimately, taxes were increased on salt and alcohol to fund the extra costs, although the Russian people were already burdened by taxes to pay for the war. The final cost was 2,500,000 rubles. By 1759, shortly before Elizabeth's death, a Winter Palace truly worthy of the name was nearing completion.

=== Catherine II (1762–1796) ===
It was Empress Elizabeth who selected the German princess, Sophie of Anhalt-Zerbst, as a bride for her nephew and successor, Peter III. The marriage was not a success, but it was this princess who, as Catherine the Great, came to be chiefly associated with the Winter Palace. In 1762, following a coup d'état, in which her husband was murdered, Catherine paraded her seven-year-old son, Paul, on the Winter Palace's balcony to an excited crowd below. She was not presenting her son as the new and rightful ruler of Russia, however; that honour she was usurping herself.

St George's Hall (13 on plan above), the principal throne room of the Tsars of Russia. The room was a late addition to the Palace for Catherine II. Painting by Konstantin Ukhtomsky.

Catherine's patronage of the architects Starov and Giacomo Quarenghi saw the palace further enlarged and transformed. At this time an opera house which had existed in the southwestern wing of the palace was swept away to provide apartments for members of Catherine's family. In 1790, Quarenghi redesigned five of Rastrelli's state rooms to create the three vast halls of the Neva enfilade. Catherine was responsible for the three large adjoining palaces, known collectively as the Hermitage—the name by which the entire complex, including the Winter Palace, was to become known 150 years later.

Catherine had been impressed by the French architect Jean-Baptiste Vallin de la Mothe, who designed the Imperial Academy of Arts (also in Saint Petersburg) and commissioned him to add a new wing to the Winter Palace. This was intended as a place of retreat from the formalities and ceremonies of the court. Catherine christened it the Hermitage (14), a name used by her predecessor Tsaritsa Elizabeth to describe her private rooms within the palace.

The interior of the Hermitage wing was intended to be a simple contrast to that of the Winter Palace. It is said that the concept of the Hermitage as a retreat, was suggested to Catherine by Jean Jacques Rousseau. In reality, it was planned as another palace in itself, connected to the main palace by a series of covered walkways and heated courtyards in which rare exotic birds could live. Noted for its fine portico and attention to details of a delicate nature, it was richly furnished with an ever-growing art collection.

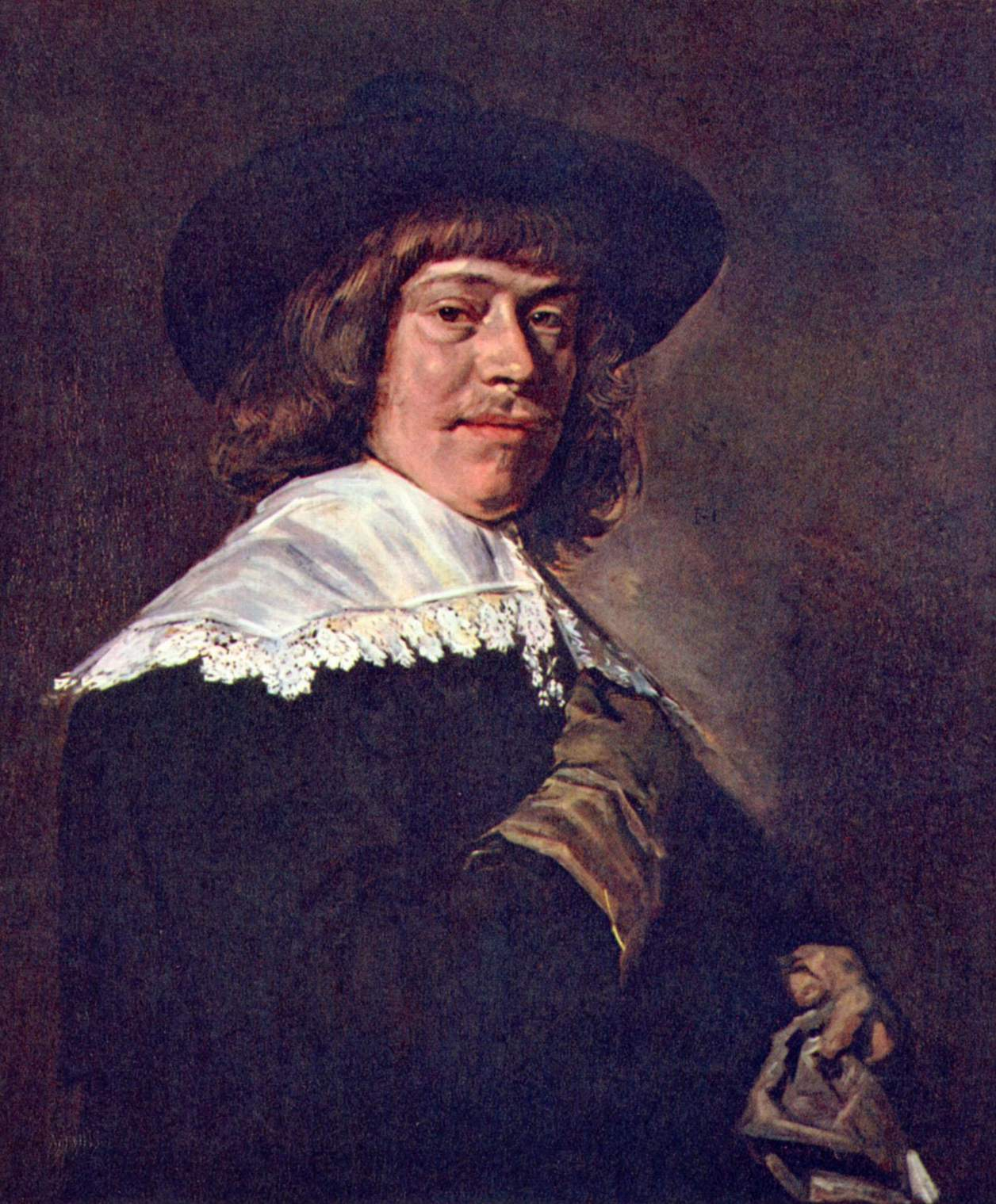
Frans Hals' Portrait of a Man with a Glove, purchased for the Winter Palace in 1764

The palace's art collection was assembled haphazardly in an eclectic manner, often with an eye to quantity rather than quality. Many of the artworks purchased for the palaces arrived as parts of a job lot as the sovereign acquired whole ready-assembled collections. The Empress' ambassadors in Rome, Paris, Amsterdam and London were instructed to look out for and purchase thousands of works of art on her behalf. Ironically, while Saint Petersburg high society and the extended Romanov family derided Russia's last Empress for furnishing her palaces "mail order" from Maples of London, she was following the practices of Catherine the Great, who, if not exactly by "mail order", certainly bought "sight unseen".

In this way, between 1764 and 1781 Catherine the Great acquired six major collections: those of Johann Ernst Gotzkowsky; Heinrich von Brühl; Pierre Crozat; Horace Walpole; Sylvestre-Raphael Baudouin; and finally in 1787, the John Lyde-Brown collection. These large assemblies of art included works by such masters as Rembrandt, Rubens, Titian, Raphael, Tiepolo, van Dyck and Reni. The acquisition of 225 paintings forming the Gotzkowsky collection was a source of personal pride to Catherine. It had been put together by Gotzkowsky for Catherine's adversary, Frederick the Great of Prussia who, as a result of his wars with Russia, could not afford to pay for it. This collection included some great Flemish and Dutch works, most notably Frans Hals' Portrait of a Man with a Glove. In 1769, the Bruhl collection brought to the Winter Palace two further works by Rembrandt, Portrait of a Scholar and Portrait of an Old Man in Red.

While some aspects of this manic collecting could have been a manifestation of Catherine's desire for a recognition of her intellectual concepts, there was also a more fundamental motivation: necessity. Just twenty years earlier, so scarce were the furnishings of the Imperial palaces that bedsteads, mirrors, tables and chairs had to be conveyed between Moscow and Saint Petersburg each time the court moved.

As the palace filled with art, it overflowed into the Hermitage. So large did Catherine's art collection eventually become that it became necessary to commission the German-trained architect Yury Velten to build a second and larger extension to the palace, which eventually became known as the Old Hermitage (15). Later, Catherine commissioned a third extension, the Hermitage Theatre, designed by Giacomo Quarenghi. This construction necessitated the demolition of Peter the Great's by now crumbling third Winter palace.

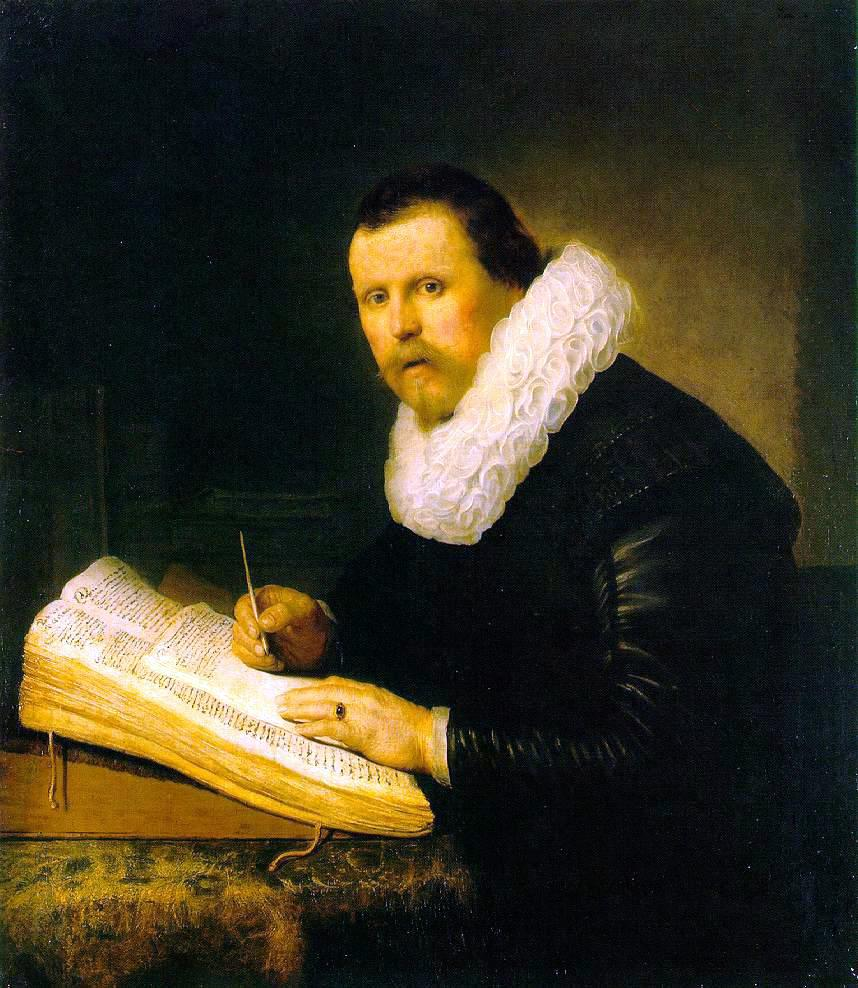
Rembrandt's Portrait of a Scholar purchased in 1769. The painting is one of several by Rembrandt in the former Imperial Collection.

The Empress' life within the Hermitage, surrounded by her art and friends, was simpler than in the adjacent Winter Palace; there, the Empress gave small intimate suppers. Servants were excluded from these suppers and a sign on the wall read "Sit down where you choose, and when you please without it being repeated to you a thousand times."

Catherine was also responsible for introducing the lasting affection for all things French to the Russian court. While she personally disliked France, her distaste did not extend to its culture and manners. French became the language of the court; Russian was relegated for use only when speaking to servants and inferiors. The Russian aristocracy was encouraged to embrace the philosophies of Molière, Racine and Corneille. The Winter Palace was to serve as a model for numerous Russian palaces belonging to Catherine's aristocracy, all of them, like the Winter Palace itself, built by the involuntary labour of Russian serfs.

The sophistication and manners observed inside the Winter Palace were greatly at odds with the grim reality of life outside its externally gilded walls. In 1767, as the Winter Palace grew in richness and splendour, the Empress published an edict extending Russian serfdom. During her reign she further enslaved over a million peasants. Work continued on the Winter Palace right up until the time of the Empress' death in 1796.

=== Paul I, Alexander I, and Nicholas I (1796–1855) ===
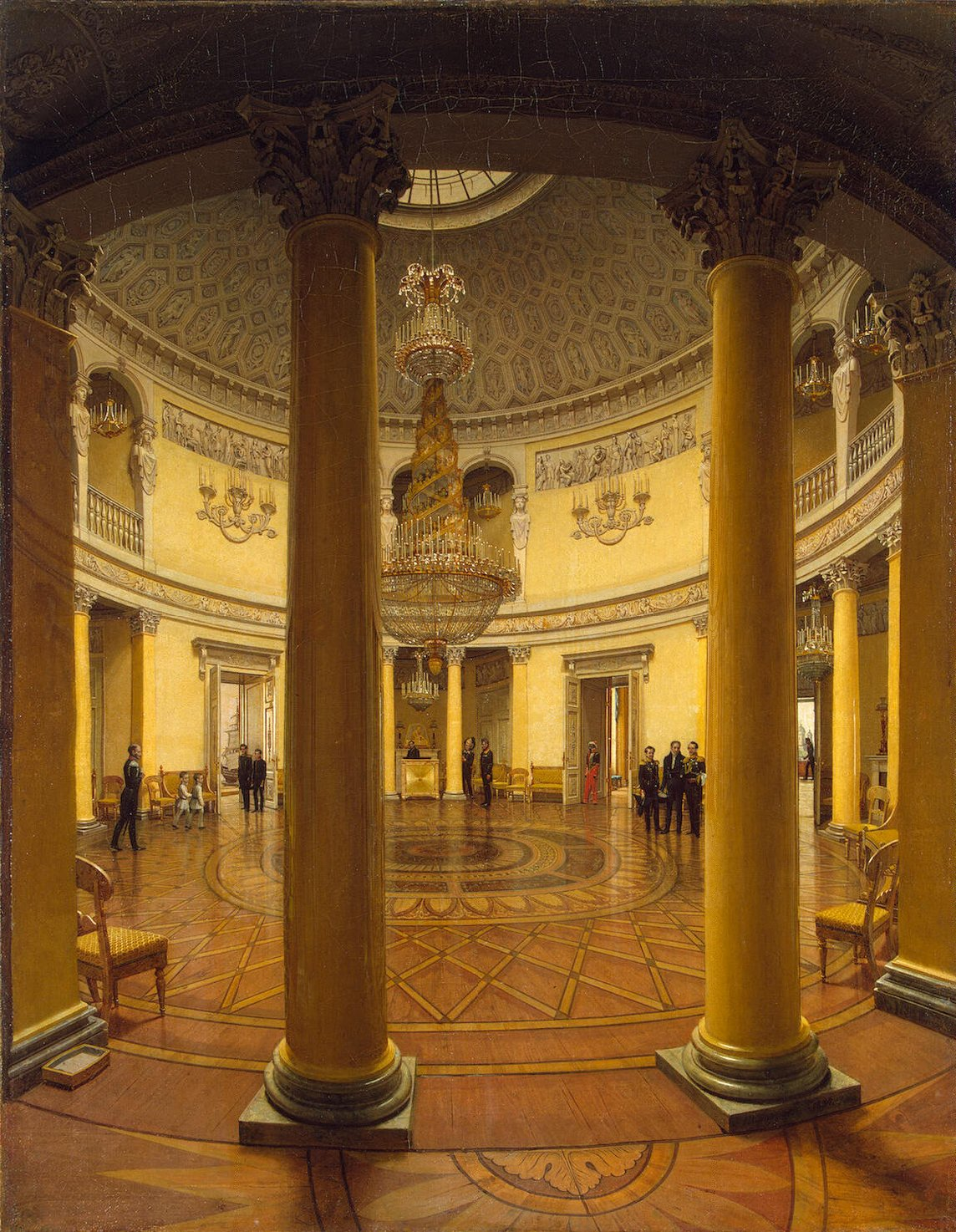
The Rotunda (26). This circular hall, dating from the early 19th century, links the state and private rooms of the palace, and represents the final and neoclassical stage of the palace's evolution. Painting by Yefim Tukharinov.

Catherine the Great was succeeded by her son Paul I. In the first days of his reign, the new Tsar (reported by the British Ambassador to be "not in his senses") augmented the number of troops stationed at the Winter Palace, positioning sentry boxes every few metres around the building. Eventually, paranoid for his security and disliking anything connected with his mother, he spurned the Winter Palace completely and built Saint Michael's Castle as his Saint Petersburg residence, on the site of his birthplace. The Tsar announced that he wished to die on the spot he was born. He was murdered there three weeks after taking up residence in 1801. Paul I was succeeded by his 24-year-old son, Alexander I, who ruled Russia during the chaotic period of the Napoleonic Wars. Following Napoleon's defeat in 1815, the contents of the Winter Palace were further enhanced when Alexander I purchased the art collection of the former French Empress, Joséphine. This collection, some of it plundered loot given to her by her ex-husband Napoleon, contained amongst its many old masters Rembrandt's The Descent from the Cross and four sculptures by Antonio Canova.

Alexander I was succeeded in 1825 by his brother Nicholas I. Tsar Nicholas was to be responsible for the palace's present appearance and layout. He not only effected many changes to the interior of the palace but also was responsible for its complete rebuilding following the fire of 1837.

== Architecture ==
As completed, the overriding exterior form of the Winter Palace's architecture, with its decoration in the form of statuary and opulent stucco work on the pediments above façades and windows, is Baroque. The exterior has remained as finished during the reign of Empress Elizabeth. The principal façades, those facing the Palace Square and the Neva river, have always been accessible and visible to the public. Only the lateral façades are hidden behind granite walls, concealing a garden created during the reign of Nicholas II. The building was conceived as a town palace, rather than a private palace within a park, such as that of the French kings at Versailles.

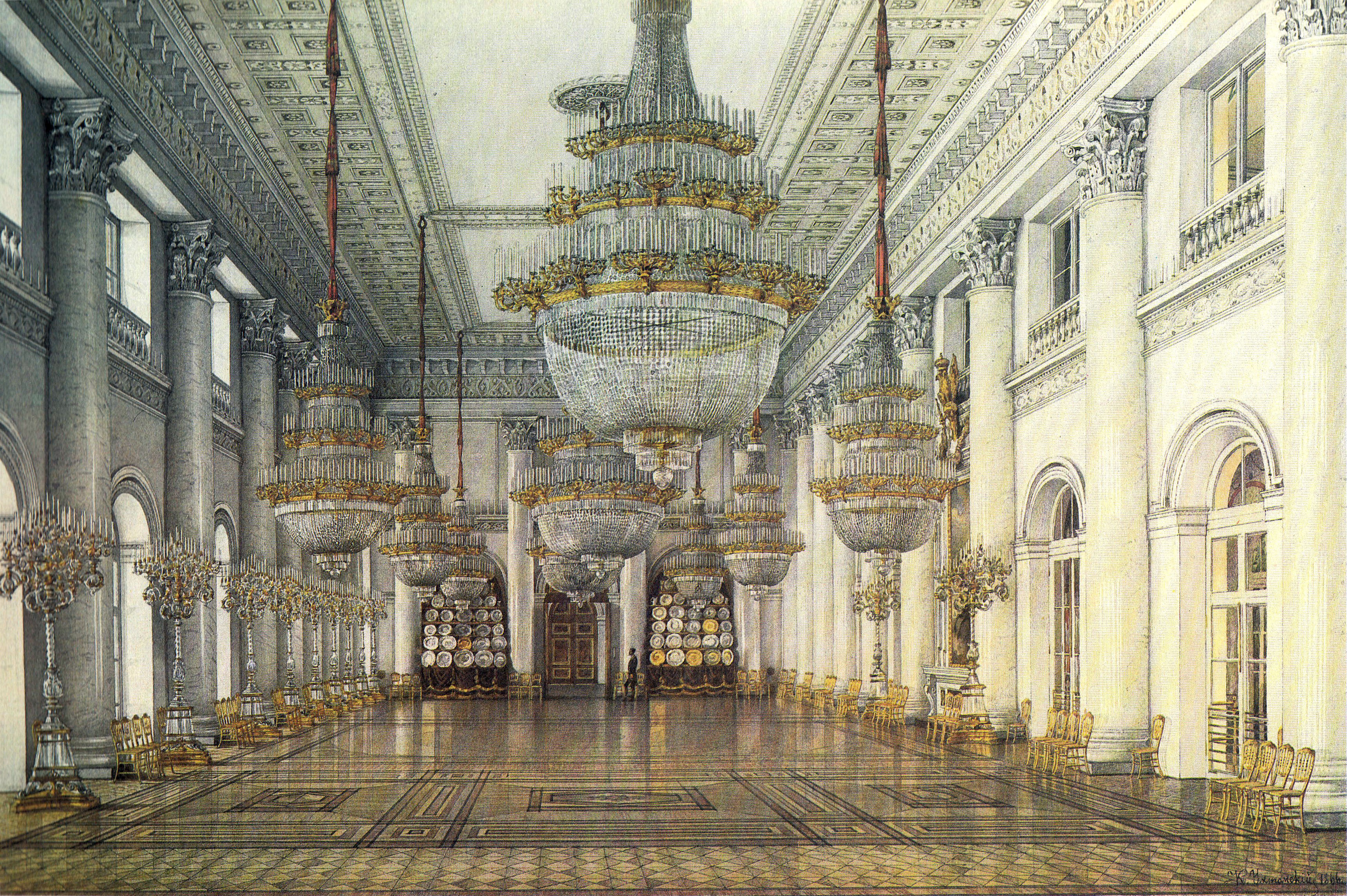
The Nicholas Hall (6 on plan) is the principal reception room, at the centre of the Neva enfilade. This room was the setting for court balls. Painting by Konstantin Ukhtomsky.

The architectural theme continues throughout the interior of the palace. The first floor, being the piano nobile, is distinguished by windows taller than those of the floors above and below. Each window is divided from its neighbour by a pilaster. The repetitive monotony of the long elevations is broken only by symmetrically placed slightly projecting bays, many with their own small portico. This theme has been constant during all subsequent rebuilding and alterations to the palace. The only external changes have been in colour: at various times in its history the palace has been painted different shades. In the eighteenth century, the palace was painted straw yellow with white and gilded ornament. Under Nicholas I in 1837, it was painted a dull red, which it remained through the revolution and early Soviet period. Following the restoration work after World War II, it was painted green with the ornament depicted in white, the standard Soviet color scheme for Baroque buildings. (The Stroganov Palace, for example, was also green and white in this period.)

Internally, the palace appears as a combination of the Baroque and the Neoclassical. Little of Rastrelli's rococo interior design has survived; only the Jordan Staircase and the Grand Church remain in their original style. The changes to the interior were largely due to the influences of the architects employed by Catherine the Great in the last years of her life, Starov and Quarenghi, who began to alter much of the interior of the palace as designed by Rastrelli. Catherine always wanted the latest fashions, and during her reign the more severe neoclassical architectural influences, fashionable in Western Europe from the late 1760s, slowly crept towards Saint Petersburg. The neoclassical interiors were further emphasised and extended during the reign of Catherine's grandson, Nicholas I.

Quarenghi is credited with introducing the Neoclassical style to Saint Petersburg. His work, together with that of Karl Ivanovich Rossi and Auguste de Montferrand, gradually transformed Saint Petersburg into an "Empire Town". Montferrand not only created some of the palace's greatest neoclassical interiors, but also was responsible for the erection of the Column of Alexander during the reign of Nicholas I in Rossi's newly designed Palace Square.

For a long time the Winter Palace was the tallest edifice in the city. In 1844, Nicholas I gave the orders to the effect that private houses should be at least 1 sazhen (2.13 m) lower than the Winter Palace. This rule was effective until 1905.

=== Interior ===
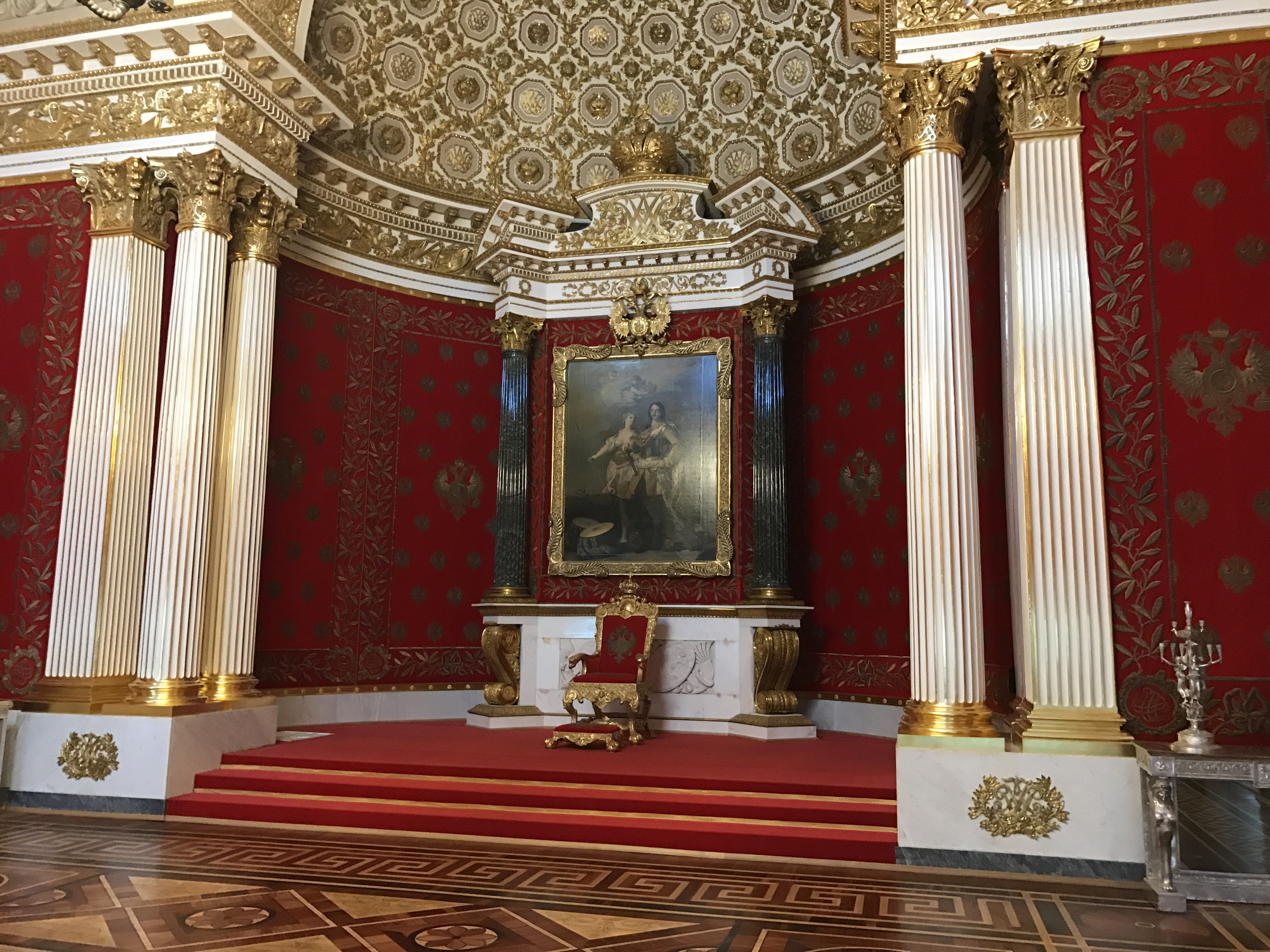
The Small Throne Room (10 on plan) was created by Auguste de Montferrand in 1833. It has columns of jasper. Diplomats gathered here on New Year's Day to offer good wishes to the Emperor.

The Winter Palace is said to contain 1,500 rooms, 1,786 doors and 1,945 windows. The principal façade is 215 metres (705 ft) long and 30 m (98 ft) high. The ground floor contained mostly bureaucratic and domestic offices, while the second floor was given over to apartments for senior courtiers and high-ranking officials. The principal rooms and living quarters of the Imperial Family are on the first floor, the piano nobile. The great state rooms, used by the court, are arranged in two enfilades, from the top of the Jordan Staircase. The original Baroque suite of the Tsaritsa Elizabeth running west, fronting the Neva, was completely redesigned in 1790–93 by Giacomo Quarenghi. He transformed the original enfilade of five state rooms into a suite of three vast halls, decorated with faux marble columns, bas-reliefs and statuary.

Plan showing the use and division of the principal floor, as occupied in the 1840s. 1 (red): state and most formal rooms; 2 (dark green): apartments of the Tsar; 3 (pink): apartments of the Empress; 4: apartments of the Tsarevich, other times part of principal guest suite; 5: apartments of the Tsarevna; 6: apartments reserved for guests of the highest rank and members of the Imperial Family; 7: nurseries of the 3rd and the 4th in line to the throne; 8: general private rooms of the Imperial Family; 9: principal guest suite, used immediately after their marriage by Grand Duchess Maria Nikolaevna and her husband.

A second suite of state rooms running south to the Great Church was created for Catherine II. Between 1787 and 1795, Quarenghi added a new eastern wing to this suite which contained the great throne room, known as St George's Hall (13), which linked the Winter Palace to Catherine's less formal palace, the Hermitage, next door. This suite was altered in the 1820s when the Military Gallery (11) was created from a series of small rooms, to celebrate the defeat of Napoleon. This gallery, which had been conceived by Alexander I, was designed by Carlo Rossi and was built between June and November 1826 under Nicholas I; it was inaugurated on 25 October 1826. For the 1812 Gallery, the Tsar commissioned 332 portraits of the generals instrumental in the defeat of France. The artist was the Briton George Dawe, who received assistance from Alexander Polyakov and Wilhelm August Golicke.

Nicholas I was also responsible for the creation of the Battle Galleries (19), which occupy the central portion of the Palace Square façade. They were redesigned by Alexander Briullov to commemorate the Russian victories prior to 1812. Immediately adjacent to these galleries celebrating the French defeat, were rooms (18) where Maximilian, Duke of Leuchtenberg, Napoleon's step-grandson and the Tsar's son-in-law, lived during the early days of his marriage.

=== Fire of 1837 ===
In 1833, de Montferrand was hired to redesign the eastern state rooms and create the Field Marshal's Hall and the Small Throne Room (9 & 10). In 1837, a fire broke out. Its cause is unknown, but its spread is blamed on de Montferrand. The architect was being hurried by the Tsar for an early completion, so he used wooden materials where stone would have been better. Additionally, between the hurriedly built wooden partition walls disused fireplaces were concealed; their chimneys, coupled with the narrow ventilation shafts, acted as flues for the fire, allowing it to spread undetected between the walls from room to room until it was too late to extinguish.

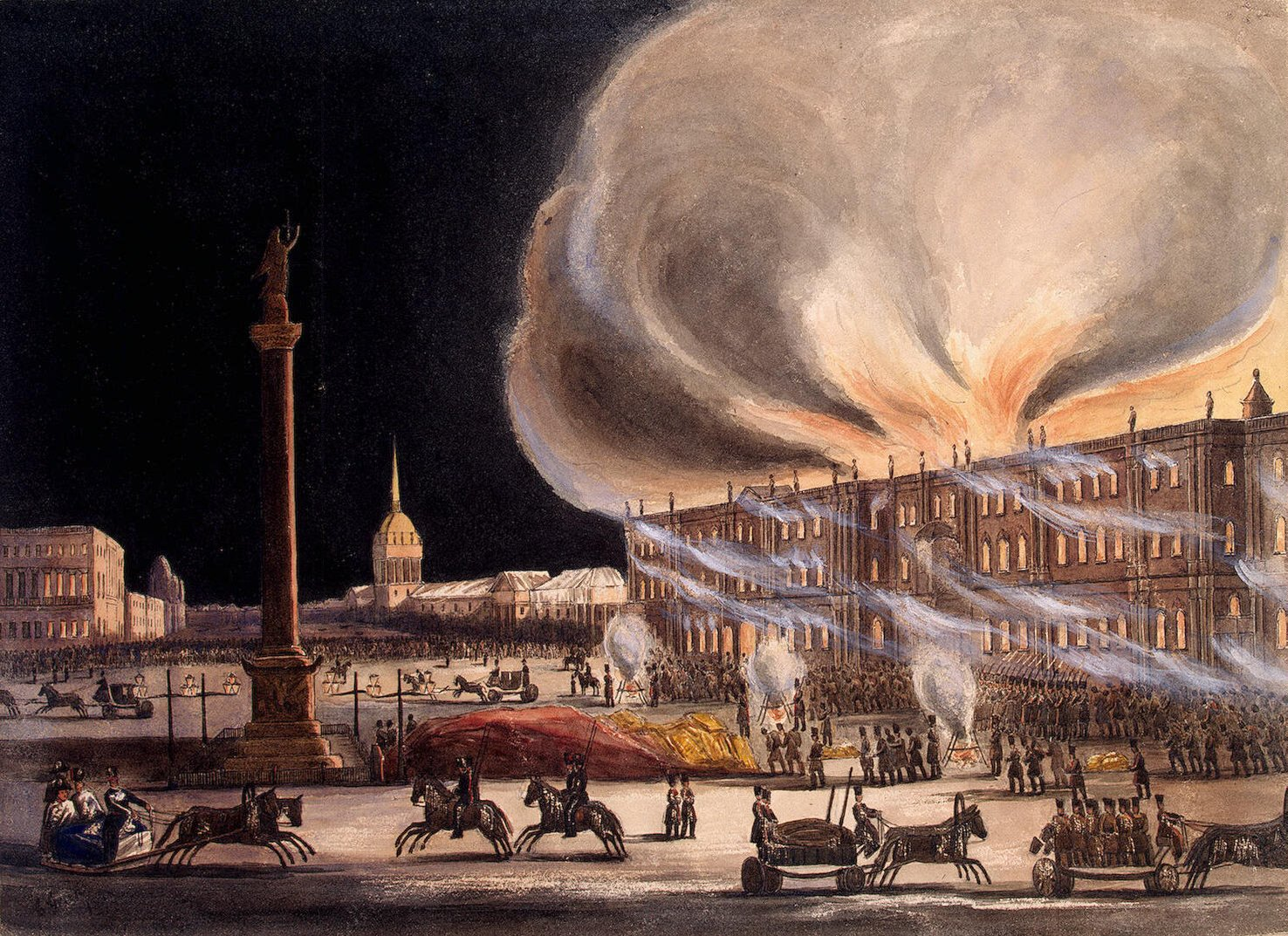
Fire in the Winter Palace by Boris Green

Once detected, the fire continued to spread, but slowly enough that the palace guards and staff were able to rescue many of the contents, depositing them in the snow in Palace Square. This was no mean feat, as the treasures of the Winter Palace were always heavy furniture and fragile ornaments rather than lighter paintings. To create a firebreak, the Tsar ordered the destruction of the three passages leading to the Hermitage, a fortunate act which saved the building and the huge art collection. The Russian poet Vasily Zhukovsky witnessed the conflagration—"a vast bonfire with flames reaching the sky." The fire burned for several days, and destroyed most of the Winter Palace's interior.

Seeming to ignore the size of the palace, the Tsar ordered that the rebuilding be completed within a year. The Marquis de Custine described the "unheard of efforts" that were necessary to facilitate this. "During the great frosts 6000 workmen were continually employed; of these a considerable number died daily, but the victims were instantly replaced by other champions brought forward to perish." The work was supervised by Pyotr Kleinmichel, who had already gained a reputation for ruthlessness when serving in the military settlements under Arakcheev.

The rebuilding of the palace took advantage of the latest construction techniques of the industrial age. The roof was supported by a metal framework, while the spans of ceilings in the great halls were supported by iron girders. Following the fire, the exterior, most of the principal state suites, the Jordan staircase and the Grand Church were restored to their original design and decoration by the architect Vasily Stasov. Some of the rooms, such as the second largest room in the Winter Palace, the Armorial Hall, became far more ornate, however, with a heavy use of gilt. The smaller and more private rooms of the palace were altered and decorated in various 19th-century contemporary styles by Alexander Briullov according to whims and fashion of their intended occupants, ranging from Gothic to rococo. The Tsarevna's crimson boudoir (23), in the private Imperial apartments, was a faithful reproduction of the rococo style, which Catherine II and her architects started to eliminate from the palace less than 50 years earlier. One of the palace's most notable rooms was created as a result of the fire when the Jasper Room, which had been destroyed, was rebuilt as the Malachite Drawing Room, the principal reception room of the Tsaritsa's suite. The Tsar himself, for all the grandeur he created in his palaces, loved the greatest simplicity. His bedroom at the Winter Palace was spartan, with no ornaments save for some maps and an icon, and he slept on a camp bed with a straw mattress.

== Usage of the palace ==
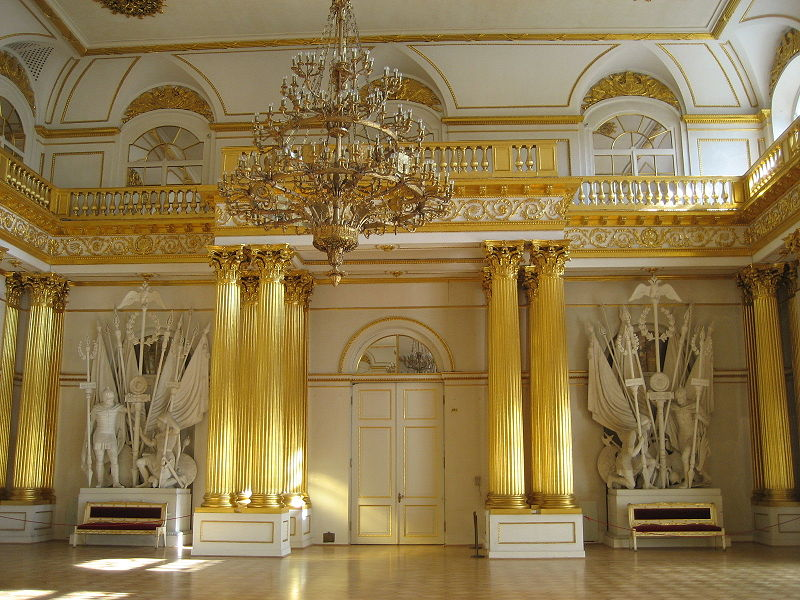
The Armorial Hall, or Guard Room (11 on plan), is decorated with vast stucco panoplies.

While the state rooms occupied the northern and eastern wings of the palace and the private rooms of the Imperial Family occupied the western wing, the four corners of the building contained the smaller rooms, which were the apartments of lesser members of the Imperial Family, often being of two floors. This is one of the reasons that the palace can appear a confusing assortment of great halls or salons with no obvious purpose located in odd corners of the palace. The fact that the Malachite Drawing Room is separated from the equally large Gold Drawing Room by a series of bedrooms and small cabinets initially seems unusual. However, when considered in the context that the Malachite Drawing Room was the principal reception room of the Empress' apartment while the Gold Drawing Room was the principal reception room of the apartment of her daughter-in-law, the Tsarevna, the arrangement of the rooms makes more sense. Similarly the vast White Hall, so far from the other grand halls, was in fact the principal hall of the Tsarevich's and Tsarevna's apartments. Thus the Winter Palace can be viewed as a series of small palaces within one large palace, with the largest and grandest rooms being public while the residents lived in suites of varying sizes, allocated according to rank.

As the formal home of the Russian Tsars, the palace was the setting for entertaining. The dining table could seat 1,000 guests, while the state rooms could contain up to 10,000 people—all standing, as no chairs were provided. These rooms, halls and galleries were heated. While it was sub-zero outside, exotic plants bloomed within, while the lighting gave the ambiance of a summer's day.

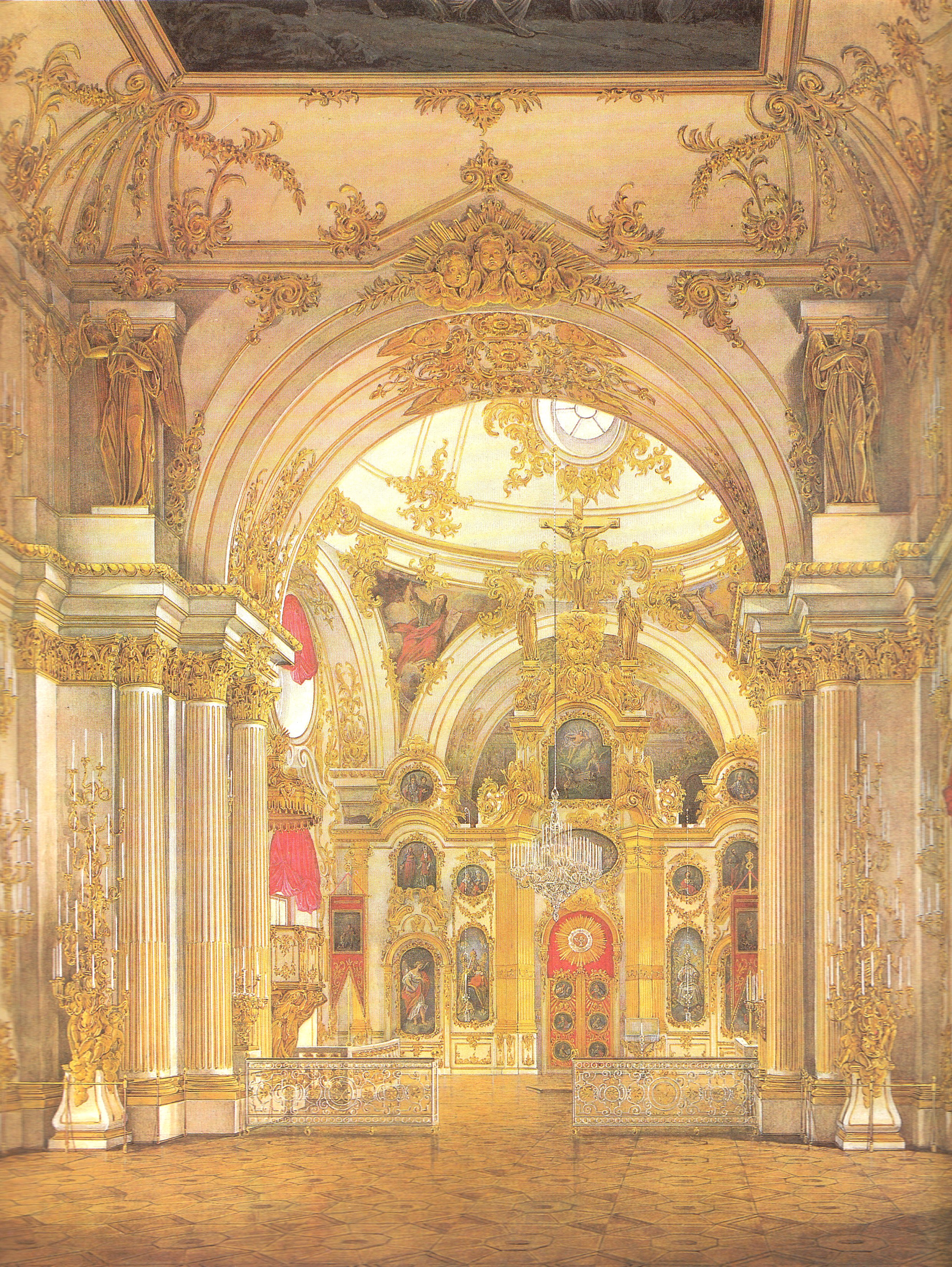
The Winter Palace's Grand Church today retains its original rococo decoration. The onion dome above it is one of the few concessions to an older Russian architecture allowed to be visible from the exterior. Painting by Eduard Hau.

Guests on ceremonial and state occasions would follow a set processional route, arriving at the palace courtyard through the central arch of the south façade, and then entering the palace through the state entrance (sometimes called the Ambassadors' Entrance) (8). They would then proceed through the colonnaded Jordan Hall before mounting the gilded Imperial staircase (8), from where the two enfilades of state rooms spread out. The principal or Jordan Staircase, so-called because on the Feast of the Epiphany, the Tsar descended in state for the ceremony of the Blessing of the Waters, is one of the few parts of the palace to retain the original 18th century rococo style, although the massive grey granite columns were added in the mid-19th century.

One of the most important rooms was the Palace's Grand Church (16). Granted cathedral status, it was of greater religious significance than the chapels of most European royal palaces. It was here that Romanov weddings were usually celebrated with a rigid and unchanging tradition and protocol. Even the bride's dress, and the manner of donning it, was dictated by tradition. Dressed by the Empress, the bride and her procession would pass from the Malachite Drawing Room to the church through the state rooms.

The Imperial Family were not the only residents of the palace; below the metal framework in the attics lived an army of servants. So vast were the servants' quarters that a former servant and his family, unbeknownst to the palace authorities, moved into the roof of the palace. They were only discovered by the smell of the manure from the cow that they had also smuggled into the building with them to provide fresh milk. It seems this cow was not the only bovine in the attics; other cows were kept next to the room occupied by the Maids of Honour, to provide fresh milk for the kitchens. This practice was discontinued after the 1837 fire.

=== Imperial Hermitage Museum ===
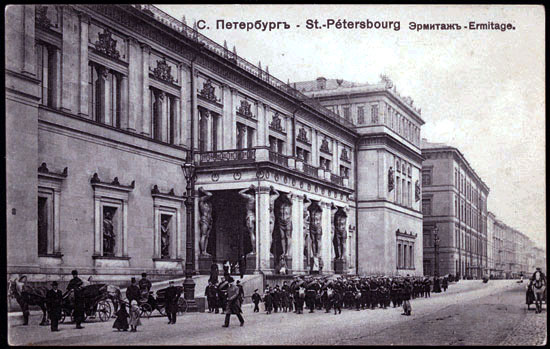
The Atlantes portico of Nicholas I's New Hermitage, Russia's first public art gallery

After the death of Catherine the Great, the Hermitage had become a private treasure house of the Tsars, who continued collecting, albeit not on the scale of Catherine the Great. In 1850, the collection of Cristoforo Barbarigo was acquired. This collection from the Republic of Venice brought into the Winter Palace further works by Titian, in addition to many 16th-century Renaissance works of art.

Nicholas I, conscious of the great art galleries in other European capitals, saw that Catherine the Great's Large Hermitage (15) was vastly expanded and transformed into a purpose-built public art gallery. In 1839, German architect Leo von Klenze drew up the plans and their execution was overseen by Vasily Stasov, assisted by Alexander Briullov and Nikolai Yefimov. With so many architects involved there were inevitably many conflicts over the design and its execution throughout the 1840s, with the Tsar having frequently to act as moderator. Eventually, after eleven years of building and architectural conflict, the first art museum in Russia, the Imperial Hermitage Museum, opened on 5 February 1852. The trebeated facades of the building were inspired by Schinkelesque architecture. It was erected in grey marble round three courtyards and the complex is noted for the asymmetrical planning of its wings and floors. By order of the Tsar, visitors to the museum were required to wear evening dress, even in the morning. The Tsar also decreed that grey top hats were "Jewish" and dress coats "revolutionary". Having negotiated the dress code, what the public saw was a huge array of art, but only a fraction of the Imperial collection, as the Winter Palace and other Imperial palaces remained closed to the viewing public.

== The last Tsars (1855–1905) ==
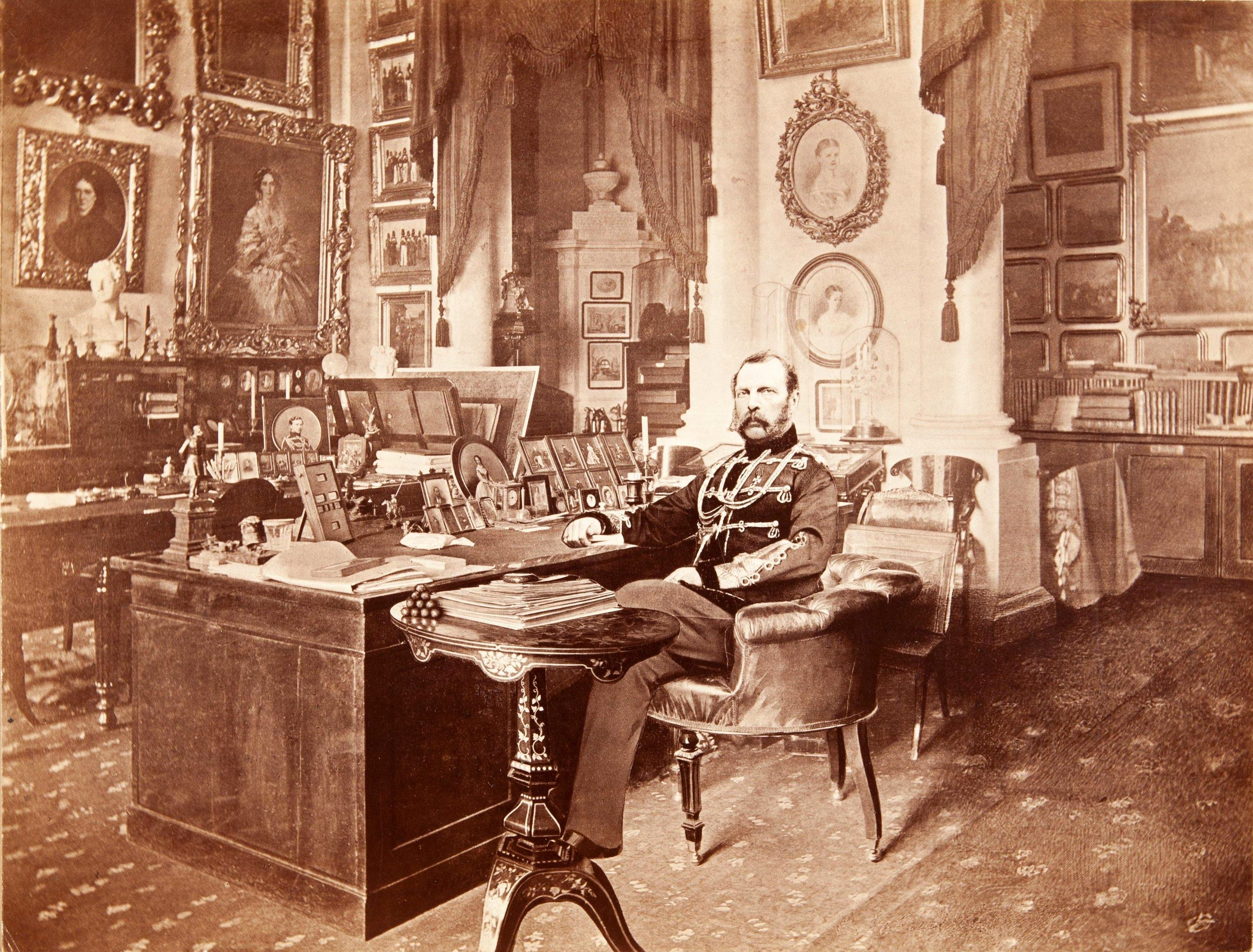
Alexander II photographed in his study (24) at the Winter Palace

The Winter Palace was an official residence of the Russian sovereign from 1732 until 1917; however, it was their home for little more than 140 of those years. The last tsar to truly reside in the palace was Alexander II, who ruled from 1855 to 1881, when he was assassinated. During his reign there were more additions to the contents; acquisitions included the ancient and archaeological collection of the unfortunate Marchese di Cavelli in 1861 and Leonardo da Vinci's Madonna and Child in 1865; Leonardo's second work of that same name, the so-called Benois Madonna, was later acquired in 1914.

Alexander II was a constant target for assassination attempts, one of which occurred inside the Winter Palace itself. This attempt on the Tsar's life was organized by a group known as Narodnaya Volya (Will of the People) and led by an "unsmiling fanatic", Andrei Zhelyabov, and his mistress Sophia Perovskaya, who later became his wife. Perovskaya, the daughter of a former Governor of Saint Petersburg, was well placed to learn information concerning happenings within the palace and through her connections learnt of repairs being carried out in the palace's basement. One of the group, a trained carpenter, was subsequently enrolled as one of the workmen. Every day he carried dynamite charges concealed amongst his tools, placing them beneath the private dining room. So great was the quantity of dynamite that the fact there was an intervening floor between the dining room and the basement was of no significance. Plans were made to detonate the bomb on the evening of 17 February [O.S. 5 February] 1880, assassinating the Tsar and Imperial family as they dined. Fortunately for the Romanovs, a guest arriving from Berlin was delayed, and for the first time in years dinner was delayed. As the family left the drawing room for the dining room the bomb exploded. So great was the explosion that it could be heard all over Saint Petersburg. The dining room was completely demolished and 11 members of the Finnish Guard in the Guard Room below were killed and a further 30 wounded. The incident represents one of the first uses of a time bomb for political purposes. On 4 March 1880, The New York Times reported "the dynamite used was enclosed in an iron box, and exploded by a system of clockwork used by the man Thomas in Bremen some years ago."

In 1881, the revolutionaries were finally successful and Alexander II was assassinated as his carriage drove through the streets of Saint Petersburg. The Winter Palace was never truly inhabited again. The new Tsar Alexander III was informed by his security advisers that it was impossible to make the Winter Palace secure. The Imperial Family then moved to the seclusion of the Gatchina Palace, some 40 miles (64 km) from Saint Petersburg. By comparison with the Winter Palace, the 600-room, moated Gatchina Palace, set within forests, was a cosy family home. When in Saint Petersburg, the Imperial Family resided at the Anichkov Palace, while the Winter Palace was used for official functions. Large economies were made in food and wine. The Tsar was highly interested in the running costs of the palace, insisting that table linen was not to be changed daily, and that candles and soap were not replaced until completely spent. Even the number of eggs used in an omelette was reduced. While the Tsar economised on household expenses, he added to the Imperial art collection of both the palace and the Hermitage. Officially, the Hermitage Museum had an annual buying allowance of 5,000 rubles, but when this proved insufficient the Tsar would himself purchase items for the museum.

Empress Maria Feodorovna (Dagmar of Denmark), the wife of Alexander III, saw that a garden was laid out in the centre of the main courtyard in 1885, an area previously cobbled and lacking vegetation. Court architect Nikolai Gornostayev designed a garden surrounded by a granite plinth and a fountain, and planted trees in the courtyard, laying limestone pavements along the walls of the palace.

In 1894, Alexander III was succeeded by his son Nicholas II. The last Tsar suspended court mourning for his father to marry his wife Alix of Hesse in a lavish ceremony at the Winter Palace. However, after the ceremony the newlywed couple retired to the Anichkov Palace, along with the Dowager Empress. There they began their married life in six small rooms.

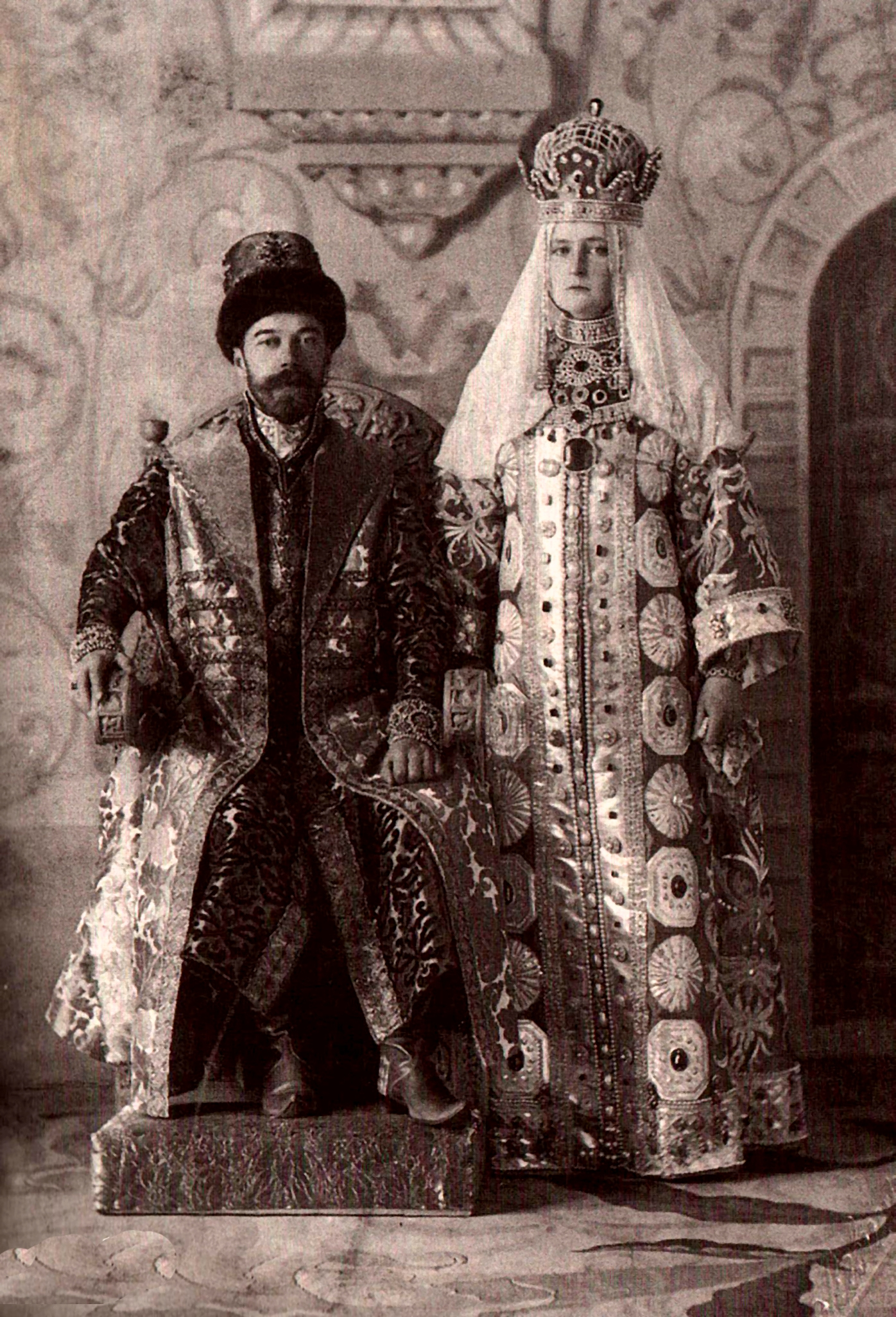
Nicholas II and the Empress dressed as Alexis I and Maria Miloslavskaya, for the Winter Palace's last Imperial ball, in 1903

In 1895, Nicholas and Alexandra established themselves at the Alexander Palace at Tsarskoe Selo. This was to be their favoured home for the remainder of the reign. However, from December 1895 they did reside for periods during the winter at the Winter Palace. Architect Alexander Krasovsky was commissioned to redecorate a suite of rooms in the north-west corner of the palace, including the Gothic library.

In 1896, the wife of Nicholas II was credited for the creation of another garden (35) on the former parade ground, beneath the windows of the Imperial Family's private apartments. She had found it disconcerting that the public could stare into her windows. The garden was created by landscape architect Georg Kuphaldt, the director of the Riga city gardens and parks. This is only one of two gardens which remain today at the palace. This was surrounded originally (until 1920, when they were demolished and partially moved to the 9 January Gardens, where today they still stand) by a high wall topped with railings, with majestic gates where a guard was always posted.

During the reign of Nicholas II, court life was quieter than it had ever been, due to the Tsaritsa's retiring nature and mistrust of Saint Petersburg's high society. In the Empress' opinion: "Saint Petersburg is a rotten town, and not one atom Russian." Under her influence, gradually the great court receptions and balls at the Winter Palace, which humoured and cultivated the powerful nobility, came to an end. They were briefly replaced by theatricals held in the Hermitage which "no one enjoyed", then even the theatricals ceased.

The palace has been repainted numerous times over its 250-year history, often in shades of ochre. In 1897, Nicholas II approved a dramatic change to a terracotta brick-red hue to match the new fence of Her Majesty's Own Garden. The repainting was carried out in 1901 after the fence's completion.

Architect Nikolai Kramskoy estimated the cost at 15,639 rubles, and the project was swiftly approved. Contractor Kruglov won the tender, receiving 29,467 rubles to scrape, clean, and repaint the palace's facades, towers, chimneys, and dome.

To create a cohesive look, all buildings on Palace Square, including the General Staff Building and the Headquarters of the Guards Corps, were painted the same brick-red color. Contemporary architects noted that this unified the diverse structures into a harmonious, monochrome ensemble.

The final great Imperial gathering at the Winter Palace was a themed fancy dress ball celebrating the reign of Alexei I, which took place on 11 and 13 February 1903 (1903 Ball in the Winter Palace). Grand Duke Alexander Mikhailovich recalled the occasion as "the last spectacular ball in the history of the empire...[but] a new and hostile Russia glared through the large windows of the palace...while we danced, the workers were striking and the clouds in the Far East were hanging dangerously low." The entire Imperial family, the Tsar as Alexei I, the Empress as Maria Miloslavskaya, all dressed in rich 17th century attire, posed in the Hermitage Theatre, many wearing priceless original items brought specially from the Kremlin, for what was to be their final photograph together.

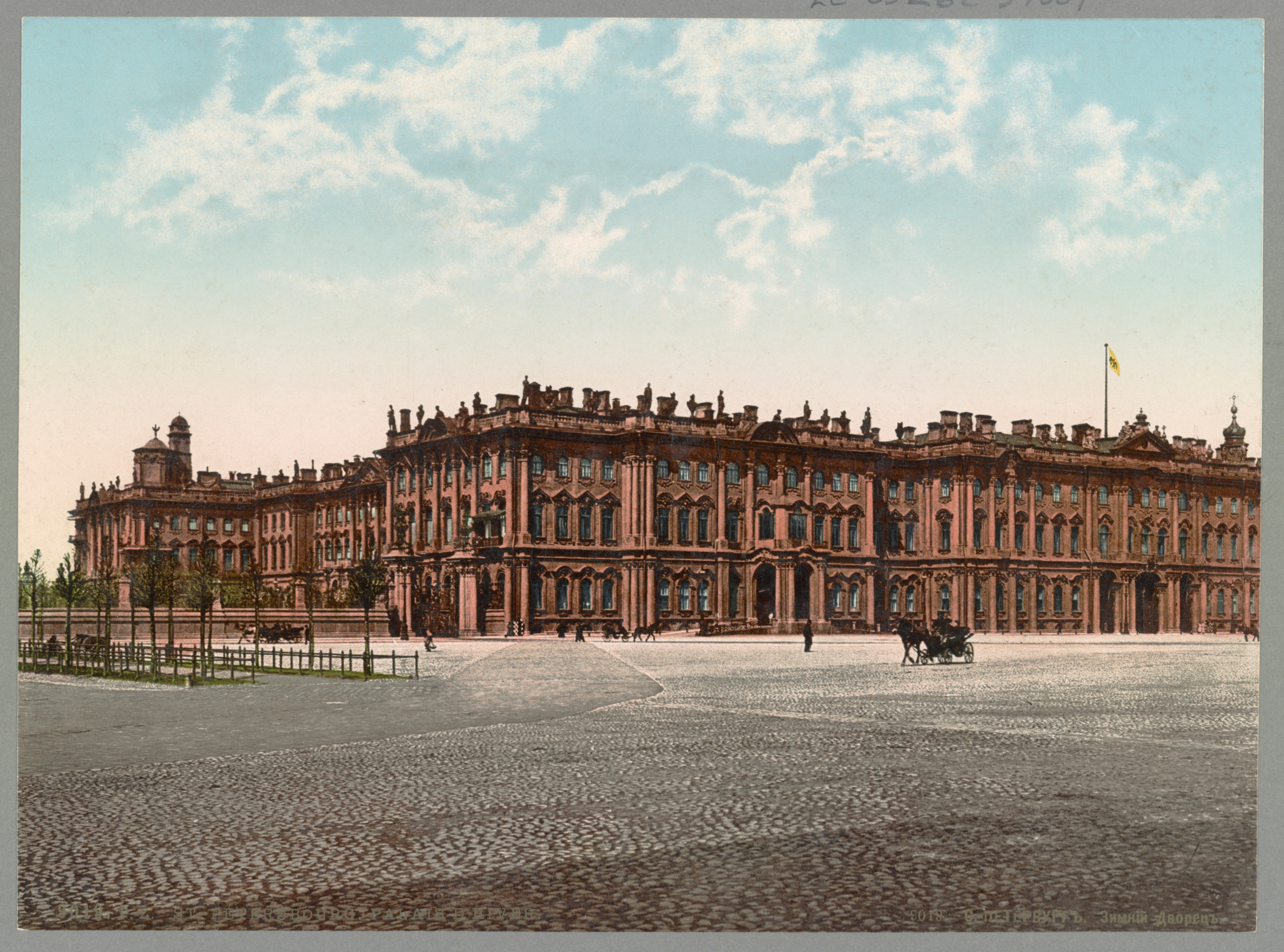
A photo of the winter palace in the 1900s, note the demolished & moved garden walls on the left, the palace was painted terracotta brick-red hue to match the new railings of the new Garden

In 1904, Russia was at war with Japan, and the newborn Tsarevich was secretly ill; the Tsar and the Empress permanently abandoned Saint Petersburg, the Winter Palace, and high society (considered by the Empress to be decadent and immoral) for the greater comfort, security and privacy of Tsarskoe Selo.

=== Last period under the Monarchy (1905–1917) ===
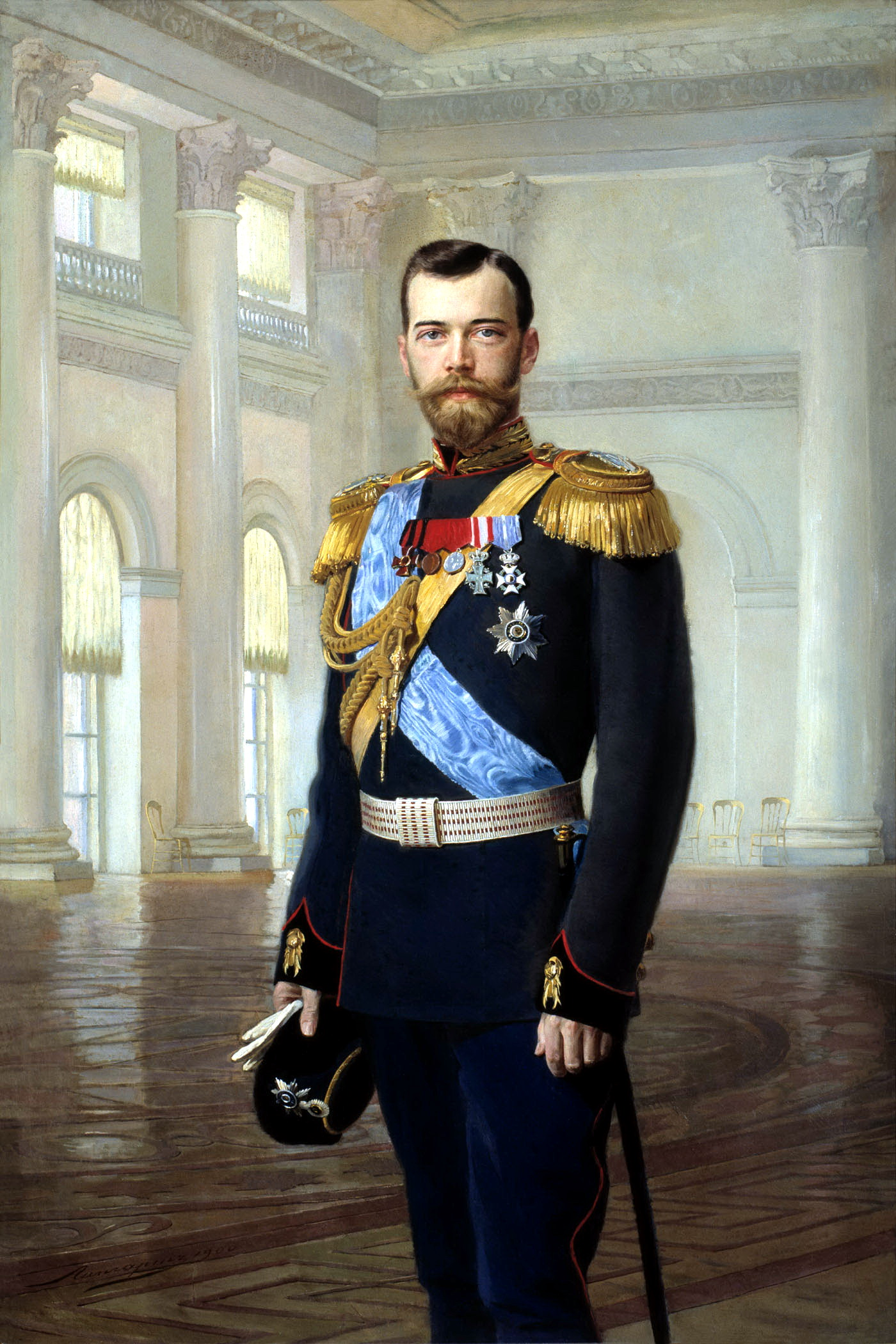
Nicholas II, last Emperor of all the Russias, in the Nicholas Hall. Portrait by Ernest Lipgart, early 1900s.

Following the Imperial Family's move to the Alexander Palace at Tsarskoe Selo, the Winter Palace became little more than an administrative office block and a place of rare official entertaining. Throughout the year, the family moved from one palace to another: in March, to Livadia; in May to Peterhof (not the great palace, but a 19th-century villa in its grounds); in June, they cruised upon the Imperial Yacht, Standart; August was spent in Poland, at Spała, September was spent back at Livadia, before a return to Tsarskoe Selo for the Winter.

The Tsar betrayed his private views of Saint Petersburg in 1912, while addressing a farewell party of dignitaries and family bidding him farewell, as the family left for warmer climes: "I am only sorry for you who have to remain in this bog." However, to the Tsar's ordinary subjects, the Winter Palace was seen not only as the home of the Tsars, but a symbol of Imperial power. In this role, it was to be at the centre of some of the most momentous happenings in Russia's early 20th century history. Three of these events stand out in Russia's history: The Bloody Sunday massacre of 1905; the opening of the first State Duma in 1906, which opened in St George's Hall (13); and finally the taking of the palace by revolutionaries in 1917.

The Bloody Sunday massacre was a result of the public ignorance of the Tsar's place of residence. It occurred on 22 January [O.S. 9 January] 1905 during a demonstration march by workers toward the Winter Palace. The closest shootings of demonstrators occurred near Saint Isaac's Cathedral at the entrance to the Alexander Garden leading to the Palace Square in front of the Winter Palace. The massacre was sparked when a Russian Orthodox priest and popular working class leader, Father Gapon, announced his intention to lead a peaceful protest of 100,000 unarmed striking workers to present a petition to the Tsar, to call for fundamental reforms and the founding of a constituent parliament. The protesters were unaware that the palace was little more than an uninhabited icon of Imperial power, and that the Tsar no longer resided there. The Tsar was not informed of the planned protest until the evening before, while no suggestion was made that the Tsar should meet a deputation or send representative to accept the petition. Instead, the Minister for the Interior, Pyotr Sviatopolk-Mirsky, drafted additional troops. As the strikers neared the palace bearing religious icons and singing the Imperial anthem, the Tsar's troops opened fire. While the number of casualties is disputed, moderate estimates average around 1,000 men, women and children killed or injured. The massacre, which came to be known as Bloody Sunday, was a serious blunder on the part of the Okhrana and was to have grave consequences for the Tsarist regime. It was also to be the catalyst for the 1905 Revolution.

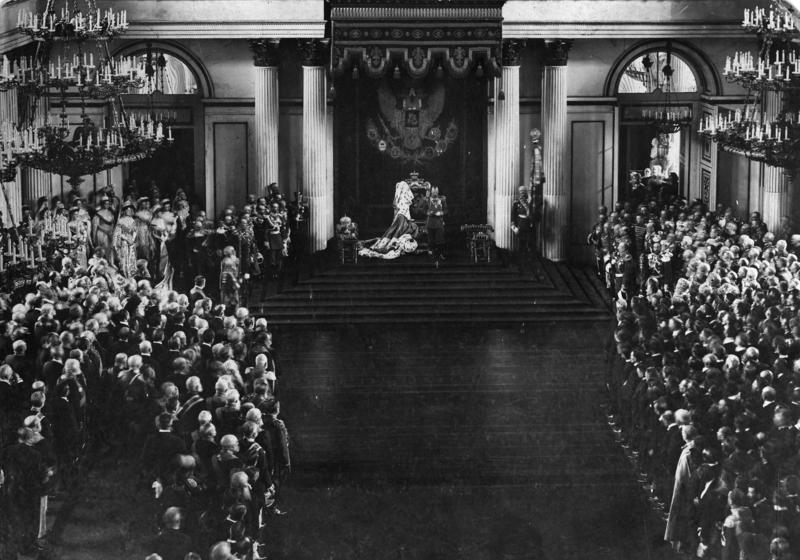
St George's Hall (13), 1906: the throne draped and flanked by the Imperial Romanov regalia, the Imperial family (to the left of the throne) and the 1st State Duma witness the Tsar opening the first Duma. The Tsar's sister believed: "The workmen....looked as though they hated us".

Subsequently, little changed politically in Russia during this period, and the Winter Palace remained in darkness. In 1913, the Romanov dynasty celebrated its tercentenary, marked by various ceremonies around the country. In 1914, Russia was forced to go to war as a result of the Triple Entente Alliance. The Tsar and Empress briefly returned to the Winter Palace to stand on their balcony to accept salutes and homage from the departing troops. As the departing troops saluted their monarch in front of the palace, plans were being drawn up to store the palace's contents and convert the state rooms into a hospital to receive returning troops.

In 1914, the Tsar and Empress greets the people assembled below for the declaration of war from the balcony of the Winter Palace.

In the initial stages of the war, Russia endured heavy losses at the Masurian Lakes and Tannenberg and it was to the Winter Palace that many of the wounded returned. Rechristened the Tsarevich Alexey Nikolayevich Hospital, from October 1915, the palace was a fully equipped hospital, its staterooms transformed into hospital wards. The Fieldmarshals' Hall became a dressing station, the Armorial Hall an operating theatre. The small throne room became a doctor's mess room, while more lowly staff were accommodated in the Nicholas Hall and the Anteroom. Nurses were housed in the more intimate apartments once reserved for members of the extended Romanov family. The 1812 Gallery became a store room, the vestibule of the Jordan staircase the hospital's canteen, and its landings offices.

1915, the Nicholas Hall, transformed to a hospital ward

As the war went badly for Russia, its catastrophes were reflected in Petrograd (as Saint Petersburg was renamed in 1914 to get rid of the German-sounding name). The Tsar had decided to lead from the front, leaving the Empress to effectively rule Russia from Tsarskoe Selo. It was an unpopular move with both the Tsar's subjects and the Romanov family, as the Empress hired and fired indiscriminately often, it was supposed, on the advice of her favourite, Rasputin. Following Rasputin's murder by the Tsar's nephew-in-law in December 1916, the Empress' decisions and appointments became more erratic and the situation worsened and Saint Petersburg fell into the full grip of revolution.

Stranded in his train while on his way back to the capital, with no way of arriving, on 15 March 1917, Nicholas II abdicated in favour of his brother, Grand Duke Mikhail Alexandrovich. The Grand Duke promptly refused to accept the throne without the support of the army and his people. A provisional Government was appointed and many members of the former Imperial family were arrested, including the former Tsar, the Empress and their children. No member of the Romanov family have lived in the Winter Palace since the abdication in 1917 and very rarely did after 1905. Nicholas II, his wife and children were all held in captivity until they were murdered by the Bolsheviks at Yekaterinburg in 1918. Other members of the former Imperial Family either met similar fates or escaped into exile.

== The Seat of the Provisional Government (1917) ==
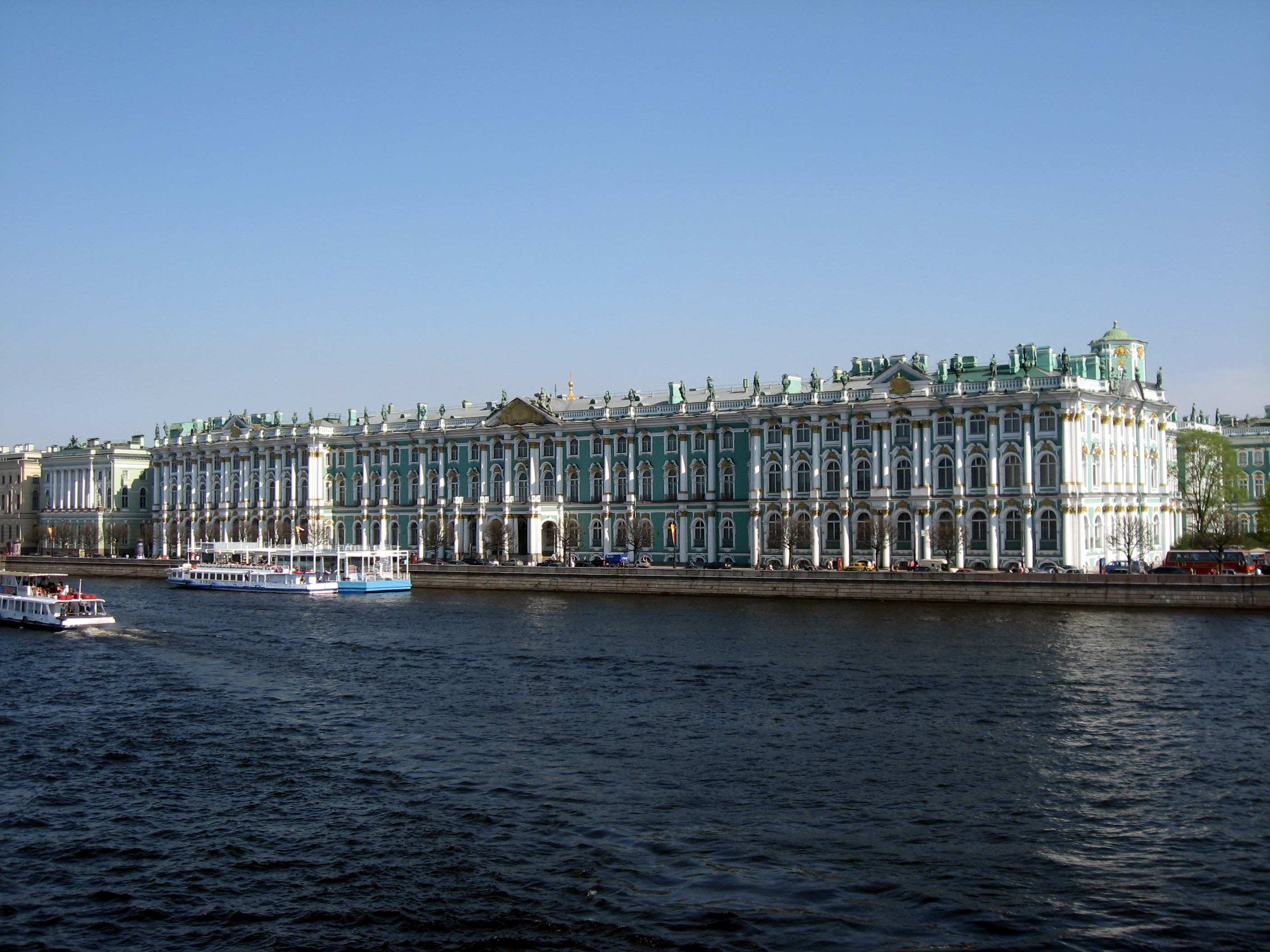
Rastrelli's Neva facade upon which Aurora trained her guns

It was this turbulent period of Russian history, known as the February Revolution, which for a brief time saw the Winter Palace re-established as a seat of government and focal point of the former Russian Empire. In February 1917, the Russian Provisional Government, led by Alexander Kerensky, based itself in the north west corner of the palace with the Malachite Room (4) being the chief council chamber. Most of the state rooms were, however, still occupied by the military hospital.

It was to be a short occupation of both palace and power. By 25 October 1917, the Provisional Government was failing and, realising the palace was a target for the more militant Bolsheviks, ordered its defence. All military personnel in the city pledged support to the Bolsheviks, who accused Kerensky's Government of wishing to "surrender Petrograd to the Germans so as to enable them to exterminate the revolutionary garrison."

Thus the provisional government, assisted by a few remaining loyal servants, who had formerly served the Tsar, barricaded themselves in the palace. Many of the administrative staff fled, leaving the palace severely under-defended allegedly by some Cossacks, Cadets, and 137 female soldiers from the Women's Battalion. Food ordered by the occupants of the palace was commandeered by the Bolsheviks, and, in a state of siege, the Winter Palace entered the most turbulent period in its history. According to Soviet history, five thousand sailors newly arrived from Kronstadt were deployed to attack the palace, while the cruiser Aurora positioned itself on the Neva, all its guns trained towards the Palace. Across the water, the Bolsheviks captured the Peter and Paul Fortress and turned its artillery towards the besieged building. As the provisional Government, now impotent, hid in the private rooms of the former Imperial Family, nervously surveying the scenes outside, one by one the Government buildings in Palace Square surrendered to the Bolsheviks, leaving the palace seemingly only hours from destruction.

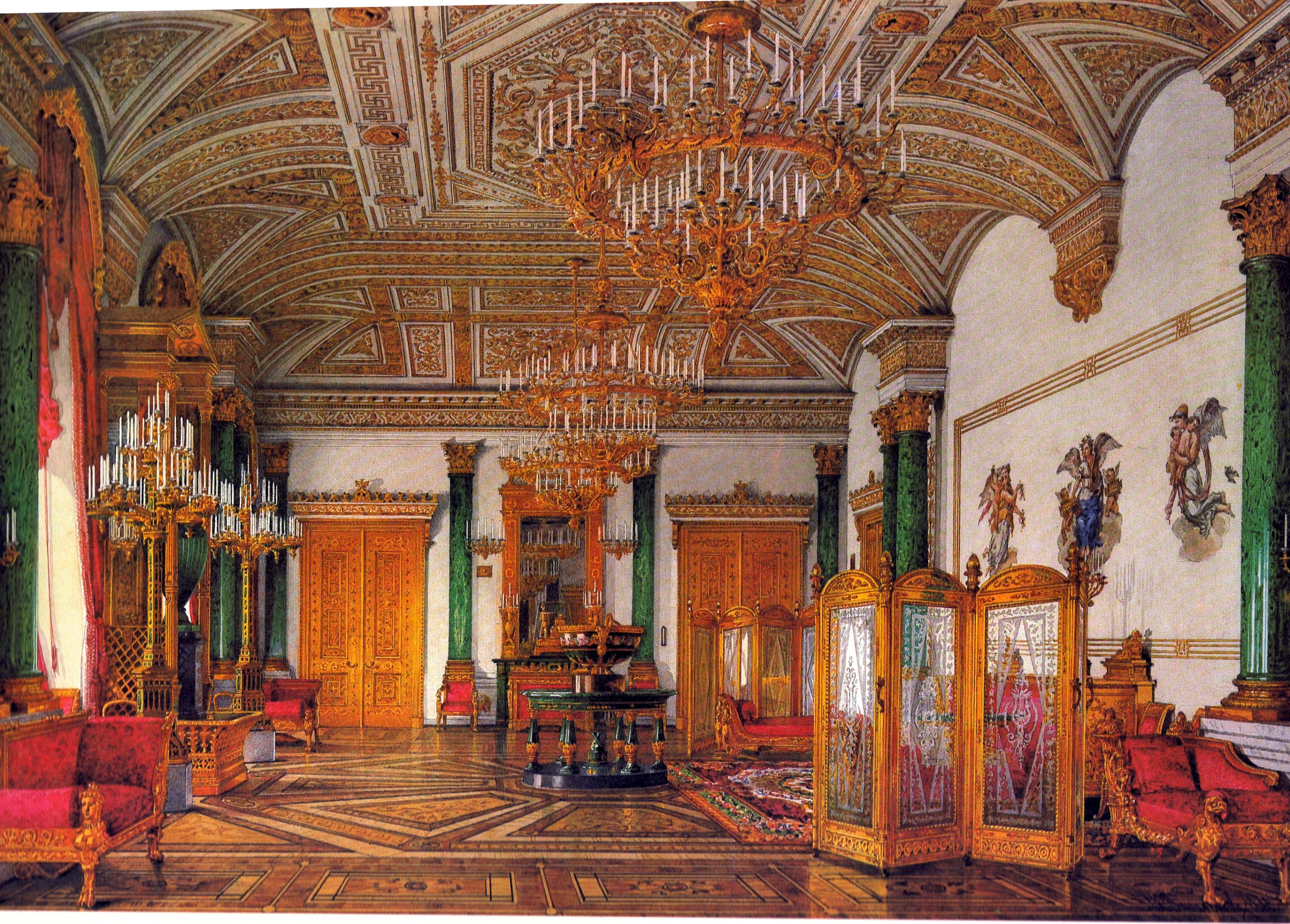
The Malachite Room, seat of the Provisional Government, who were arrested in the adjoining Private Dining Room. Painting by Konstantin Ukhtomsky.

At 7:00 pm, the Government held its last meeting in the Malachite Room, with the telephone and all contact with the outside world disconnected. A short debate determined that they would not leave the palace to attempt dialogue with the hostile crowds outside. With the palace completely surrounded and sealed, the Aurora began her bombardment of the great Neva façade as the Government refused an ultimatum to surrender. Further machine gun and light artillery fire were directed at the palace as the Bolsheviks gained entry via His Majesty's own Staircase (36). In the ensuing battle there were casualties on both sides until the Bolsheviks finally, by 2:00 am, had control of the palace. Leaving a trail of destruction, they searched room after room before arresting the Provisional Government in Small Dining Room of the private apartments (28), from where they were taken to imprisonment in the Fortress across the river. Kerensky managed to evade arrest and escape to Pskov, where he rallied some loyal troops for an attempt to retake the capital. His troops managed to capture Tsarskoe Selo, but were beaten the next day at Pulkovo.

Following the Government's arrest, an alleged eyewitness account by an unnamed source records that the Bolsheviks began rampaging:

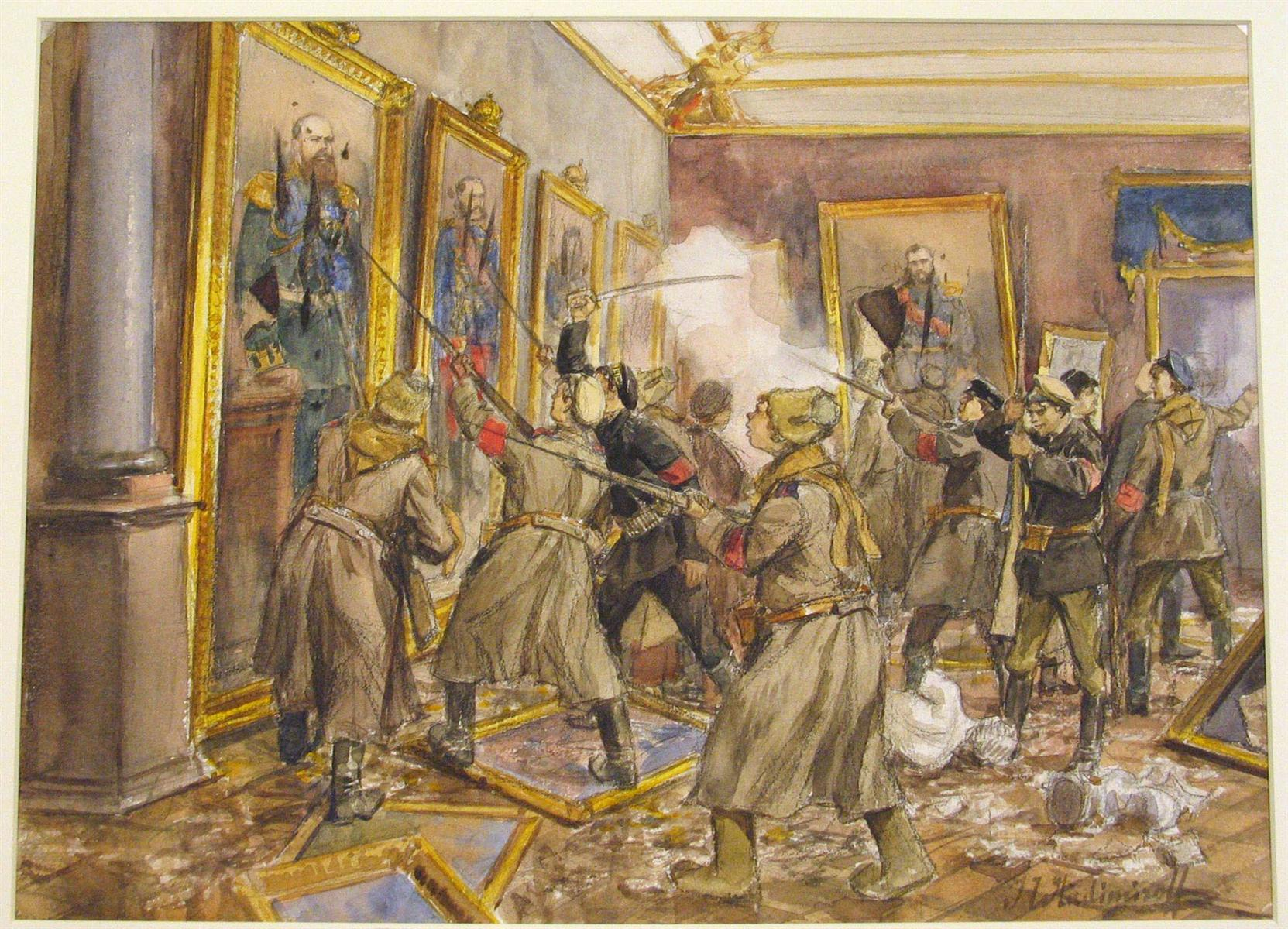
"Pogrom in the Winter Palace" by Ivan Vladimirov

"The Palace was pillaged and devastated from top to bottom by the Bolshevik[s]...Priceless pictures were ripped from their frames by bayonets. Packed boxes of rare plate and china...were broken open and the contents smashed or carried off. The library....was forced open and ransacked.....the Tsaritsa's salon, like all other rooms, was thrown into chaos. The colossal crystal lustre, with its artfully concealed music, was smashed to atoms. Desks, pictures, ornaments—everything was destroyed."

The Winter Palace's wine cellars fuelled the weeks of looting and unrest in the city which followed. Arguably the largest and best stocked wine cellar in history, it contained the world's finest vintages, including the Tsar's favourite, and priceless, Château d'Yquem 1847. So keen were the mob to obtain the alcohol, that the Bolsheviks explored radical solutions to the problem, one of which involved piping the wine straight out into the Neva. This led to crowds clustering around the palace drains. Another proposal, deemed too risky, was exploding the cellars. Eventually, the problem was solved by the declaration of martial law. It has been said that Petrograd, "perhaps with the biggest hangover in history, finally woke up and got back to some order".

The Winter Palace was now a redundant and damaged building symbolic of a despised regime, facing an uncertain future. The Storming of the Winter Palace was a historical reenactment organised by the Bolsheviks on the 3rd anniversary in 1920. With thousands of Red Guards led by Lenin, and witnessed by 100,000 spectators, the reenactment has become one of the "best known" events of the Russian Revolution.

Ironically, the Red Guard actually broke into the palace through a back door that was left open, guarded by wounded and disabled reserves. This gave rise to the occasion being described as the birth of the Soviet state. Nikolai Podvoisky, one of the original troika, which led the original storming, was so impressed by the re-enactment that he commissioned Sergei Eisenstein to make his film October. Certain features, such as the banks of floodlights which appear in Eisenstein's film indicate that Eisenstein was more influenced by the re-enactment than the original event.

== Soviet and Modern periods ==
Soviet ski troops by the New Hermitage during the Leningrad Siege in 1943

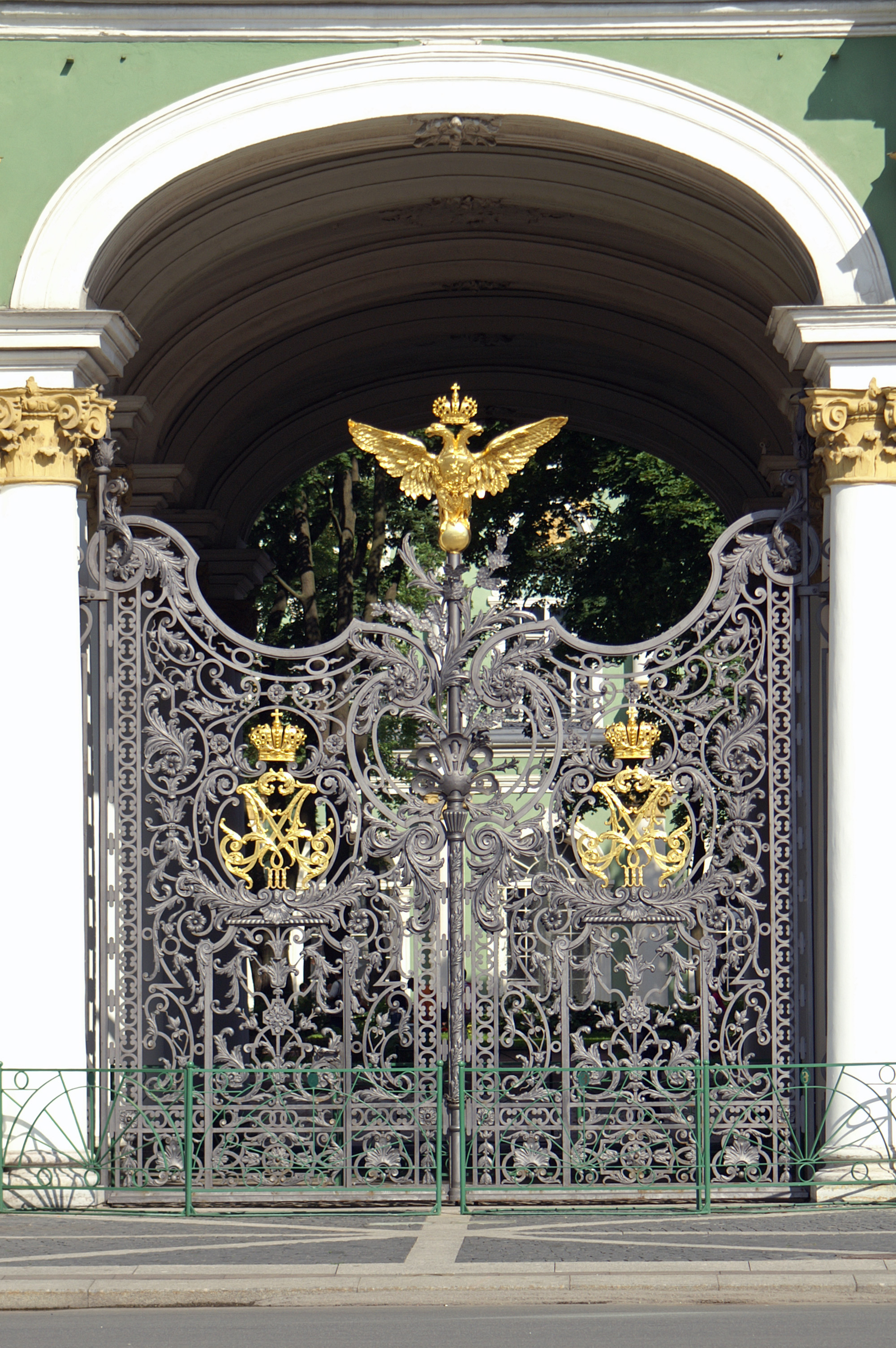
Gates to the Winter Palace. The gilded emblems of Imperial Russia, torn down in 1917, are now fully restored.

On 30 October 1917, the palace was declared to be part of the Hermitage public museums. This first exhibition to be held in the Winter Palace concerned the history of the revolution, and the public were able to view the private rooms of the Imperial Family. This must have been an interesting experience for the viewing public, for while Soviet authorities denied looting and damage to the palace during the Storming, the Russian art connoisseur Alexander Alexandrovich Polovtsov, who visited these rooms immediately before and after the event, described the private apartments as the most badly damaged area of the palace. The contents of the state rooms had been sent to Moscow for safety when the hospital was established, and the Hermitage Museum itself had not been damaged during the revolution.

Following the Revolution, there was a policy of removing all Imperial emblems from the palace, including those on the stonework, plaster-work and iron work.

In 1920, to celebrate May (workers') day, the high wall, topped with decorated railings featuring eagles and monograms, was demolished, having already been damaged since the revolution. The gates were only fully demolished in the 1930s. What remained of the upper part of the sandstone walls was relocated to serve as the walls of the new 9 January Gardens. In 2022, the railings were restored, and the restoration of the imperial monograms and eagles is set to take place in the future.

During the Soviet era, many of the palace's remaining treasures were dispersed around the museums and galleries of the Soviet Union. Some were sold for hard currency while others were given away to visiting dignitaries. As the original contents disappeared and other items from sequestered collections began to be displayed in the palace, the distinctions between the rooms' original and later use have become blurred. While some rooms have retained their original names, and some even the trappings of Imperial Russia, such as the furnishings of the Small and Large Throne Rooms, many other rooms are known by the names of their new contents, such as The Room of German Art.

Following the 1941–1944 Siege of Leningrad, when the palace was damaged, a restoration policy was enacted, which has fully restored the palace. Furthermore, as the Russian Government does not categorically shun remnants of the Imperial Era as was the case during Soviet rule, the palace has since had the emblems of the Romanovs restored. The gilded and crowned double headed eagles again adorn the walls, balconies and gates.

Today, as part of one of the world's best known museums, the palace attracts an annual 3.5 million visitors.
