= Gardens of the Winter Palace =

Garden in Saint Petersburg, Russia

Coordinates: 59.9394°N 30.3114°E

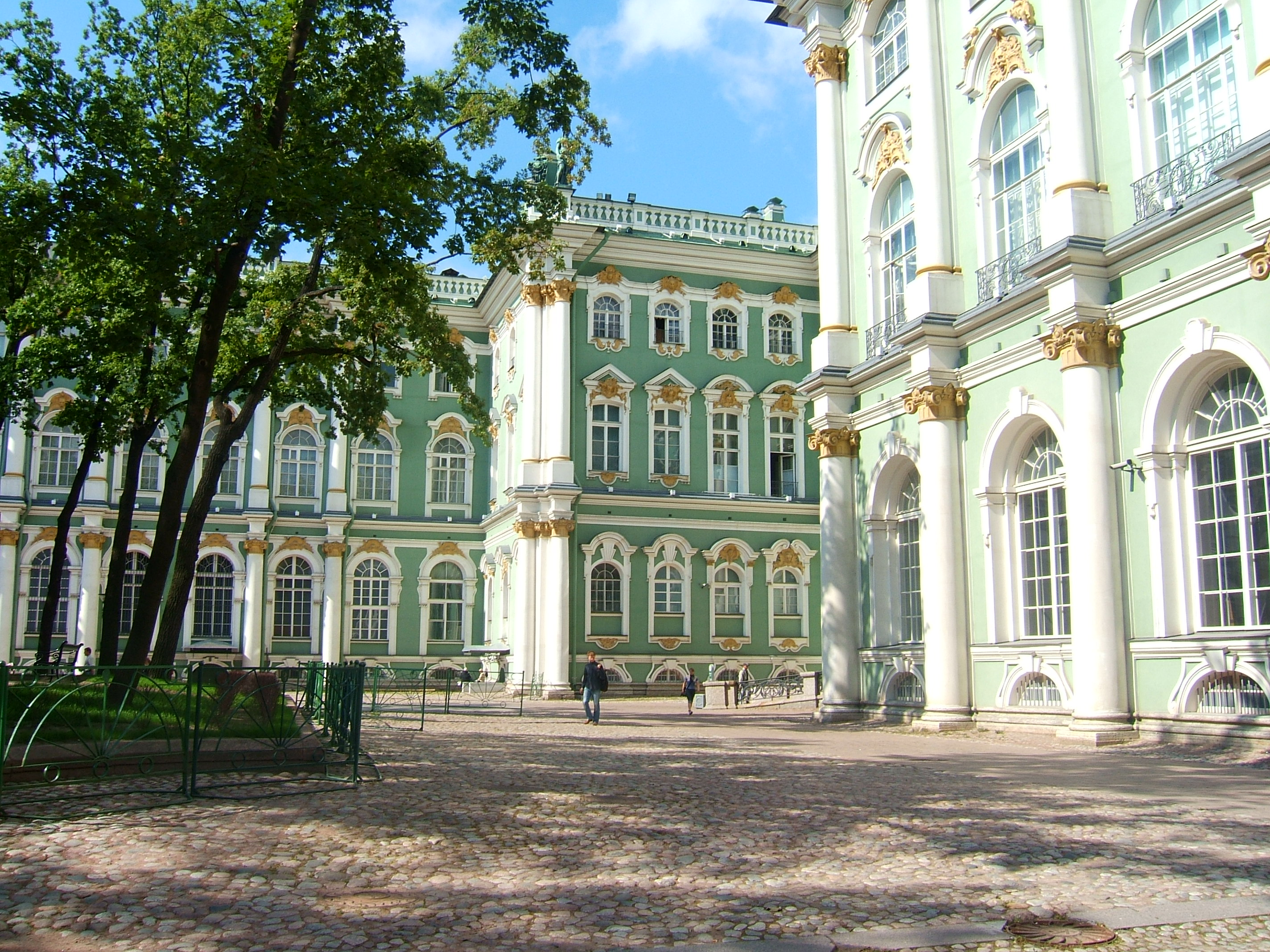
A corner of the courtyard garden of the Winter Palace

The gardens of the Winter Palace, St Petersburg, are little known, as the great imperial palace of the Romanovs was never intended to have gardens. As the Tsar's principal residence, situated in the capital, it was very much intended as a symbol of power rather than a place of relaxation and pleasure.

Bordered by the River Neva on its northern side and Palace Square on its southern, the Winter Palace was devoid of space for gardens; however, the last two empresses of Russia each created gardens from previously paved areas.

In 1885, Tsaritsa Maria Feodorovna, wife of Alexander III, had a garden created in the principal courtyard, an area which had previously been paved. This was designed in a formal rectangular shape, reflecting the shape of the courtyard which contained it. The lawned garden was planted with trees and shrubs, and surrounded by a cobbled carriage drive which led from the palace's principal arched entrance on Palace Square to the various doors giving access to the palace's interior from the courtyard.

The second garden was created in 1896 for Tsaritsa Alexandra Feodorovna, wife of the last Tsar, Nicholas II, who lived briefly at the palace at the turn of the 20th century. She found the public access to all the exterior facades of the palace disconcerting, and disliked the way that the members of the public would stare at the windows of the private apartments in the western part of the palace. She also wished for an area where her children could play in privacy and seclusion, as a result she had a garden created on the parade ground beneath her windows. This was surrounded by a high wall topped with railings. The garden was created based on a project by landscape architect Georg Kuphaldt, the director of the Riga city gardens and parks.

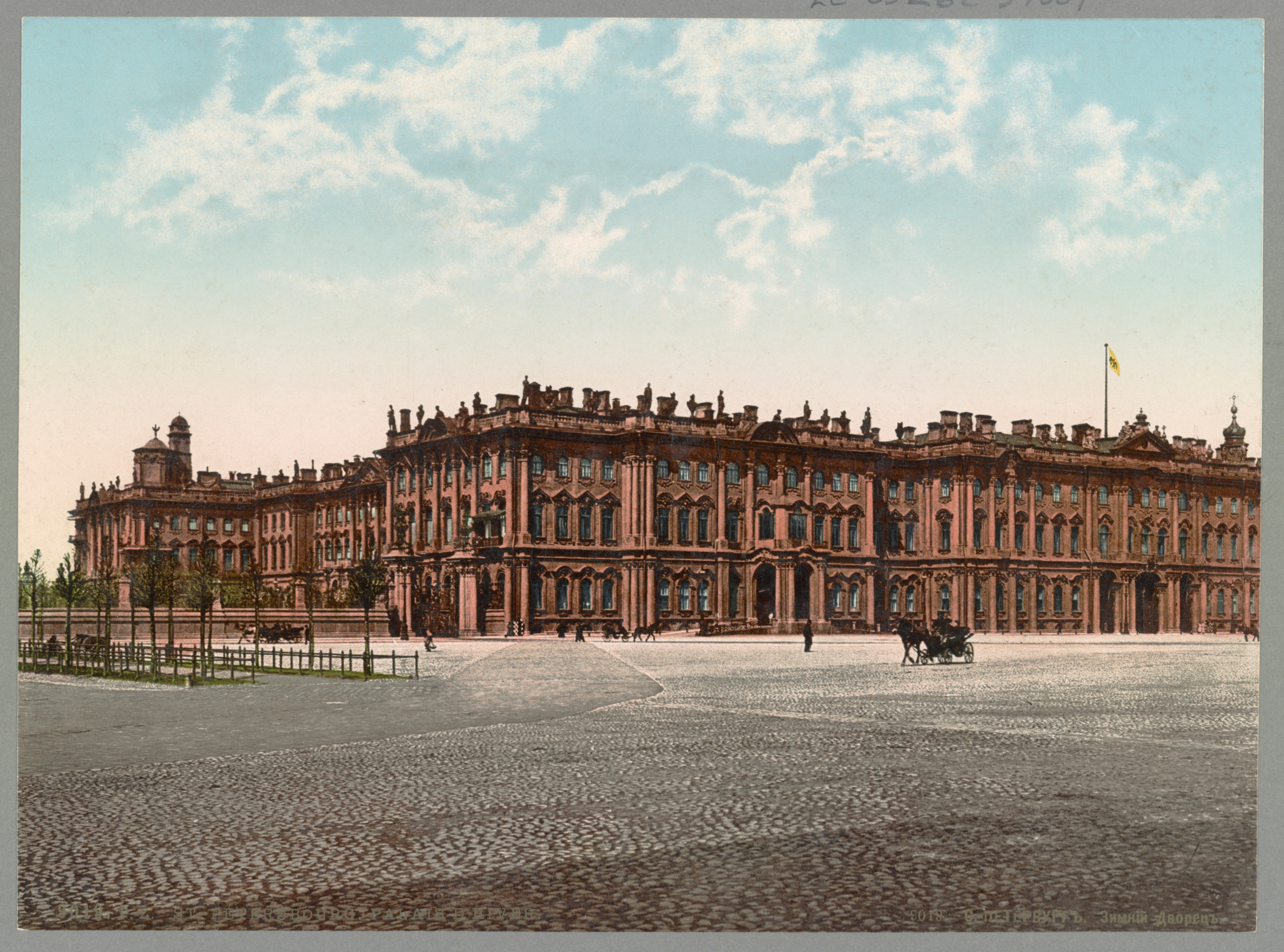
A photo of the winter palace in the 1900s, note the demolished & moved garden walls on the left

In 1920, the high wall, topped with decorated railings featuring eagles and monograms, was demolished, having already been damaged since the revolution. The gates were only fully demolished in the 1930s. What remained of the upper part of the sandstone walls was relocated to serve as the walls of the new 9th of January Gardens. In 2022, the railings were restored, and the restoration of the imperial monograms and eagles is set to take place in the future.

Design for the garden of the Tsaritsa Alexandra Feodorovna, now altered with the removal of the railings and high walls.

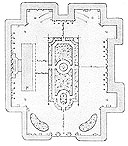
Design for the courtyard garden at the Winter Palace, for Tsaritsa Maria Feodorovna, now altered.

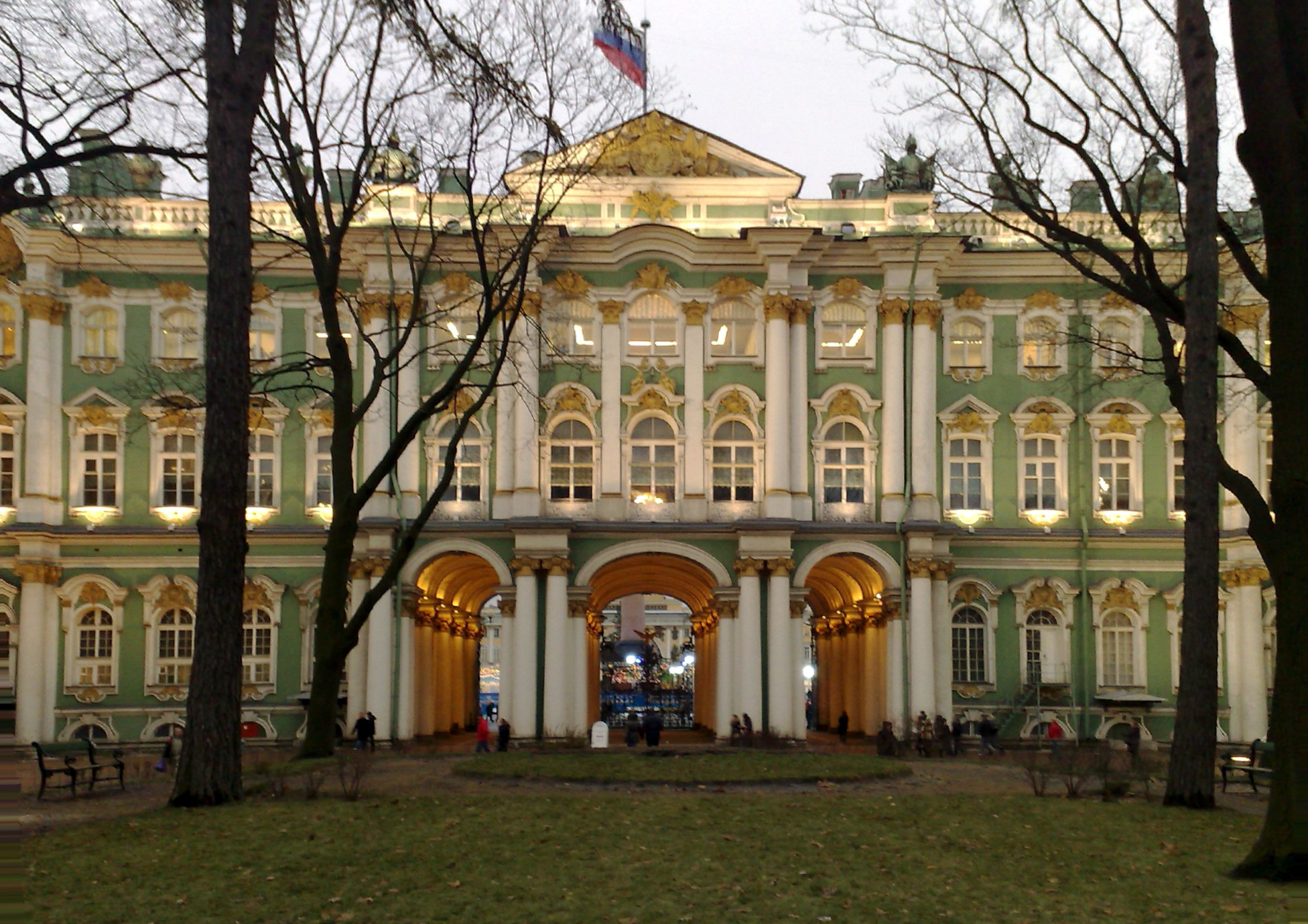
View from the courtyard garden to Palace Square.

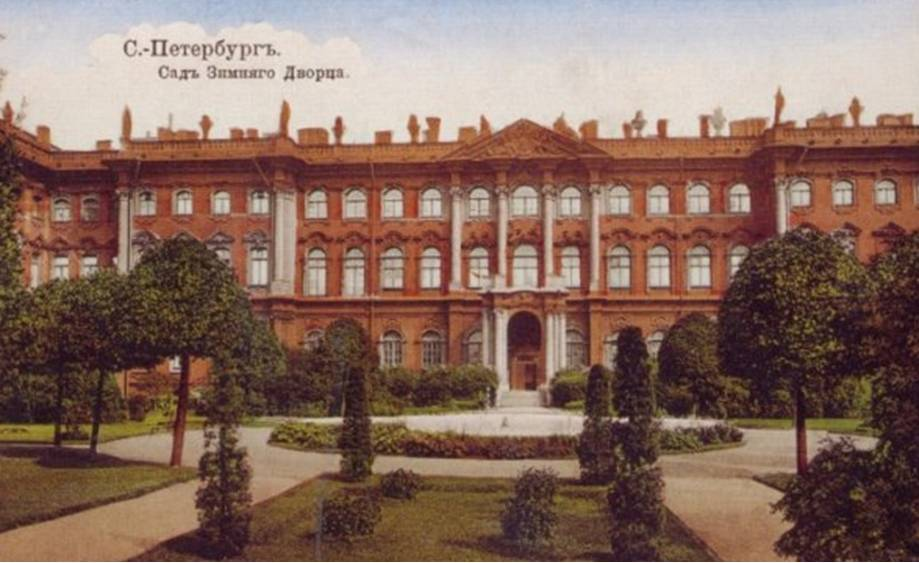
The Tsaritsa Alexandra Feodorovna's garden (35) and the private wing of the Winter Palace. Photographed shortly after the garden's creation in 1896.
