= Portrait of a Man with a Glove =

1650 painting by Frans Hals

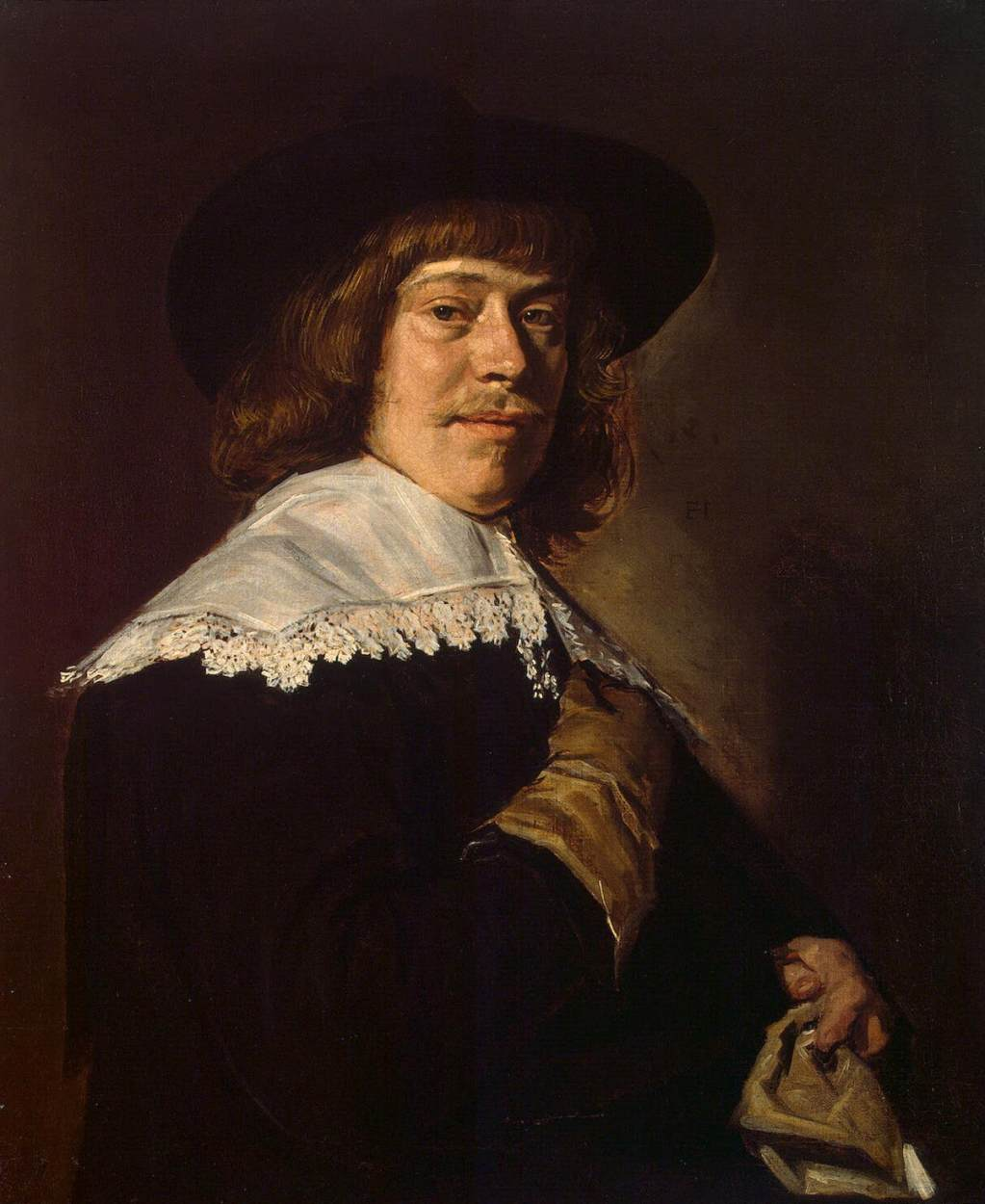

Portrait of a Man with a Glove or Portrait of a Man Holding a Glove is a 1640 oil-on-canvas painting by the Dutch artist Frans Hals. The subject of the painting is unknown but believed to be a physician, partially owing to the painting previously having been called Portrait of a Doctor. The portrait demonstrates Hals' "rapid spontaneous manner of painting". It was acquired in 1764 by the Hermitage Museum in Russia. It was previously owned by Frederick the Great, who sent it to Catherine the Great as part of a batch of paintings in lieu of paying off several debts to Russia.

The portrayed person is possibly Cornelis Schrevelius (1608–1664), a medical doctor in Haarlem between 1632 and 1641. After 1641 he was dean of the Latin school of Leiden where he succeeded his father. He was the son of Theodorus Schrevelius (1572–1649) dean of the Latin school of Haarlem and later of Leiden who was an acquaintance of Frans Hals and wrote about him in his history of Haarlem (1647/1648). Theodorus was portrayed by Frans Hals in 1617.

There are several portraits of Cornelis known. He was first portrayed in 1624 in a family portrait with his parents, brother and sister. Additional portraits dating from the 1650s and 1660s are known through engravings. In 1661 he was portrayed with his own family by Jacob Torenvliet.

This portrait by Hals was possibly in 1704 still in the possession of his son Theodorus (1639–1704) under the name "Quacksalver". The painting was used around 1685 by an English engraver for a commercial engraving "The mountback doctor and his merry Andrew". Probably the little flattering title gives his own opinion about his former profession while he was a famous Latinist and asked several times for a medical professorship at the University of Leiden which he refused.

== See also ==
- List of paintings by Frans Hals
