= Georg Kuphaldt =

German landscape architect and dendrologist

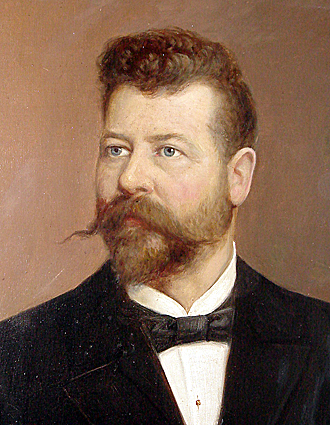
- Georg Friedrich Ferdinand Kuphaldt
- Born: June 6, 1853; Plön, Holstein
- Died: April 14, 1938 (aged 84); Berlin, Germany

Georg Friedrich Ferdinand Kuphaldt (Latvian: Georgs Frīdrīhs Ferdinands Kūfalts) (6 June 1853 in Plön, Holstein – 14 April 1938 in Berlin, Germany) was an influential German landscape architect, gardener and dendrologist of the Russian Empire.

At the age of 27, Kuphaldt was promoted to the perhaps most prestigeful position in his career as director of the city gardens and parks in Riga. The following almost 35 years he was in charge of establishing and developing the newly created administration of the city's gardens and parks, of which structures has been preserved until today. In the period from 1880 to 1914 he was also involved in planning parks and gardens throughout the Russian Empire. Some of the most renowned works of Kuphaldt are the gardens of the Winter Palace and Oranienbaum in Saint Petersburg as well as locations in Nizhny Novgorod, Dagomys in Sochi, Tsarskoye Selo and Catharinenthal Palace in Reval (now Tallinn).
