= Private Apartments of the Winter Palace =

Part of the Russian imperial palace

Coordinates: 59.9404°N 30.3139°E

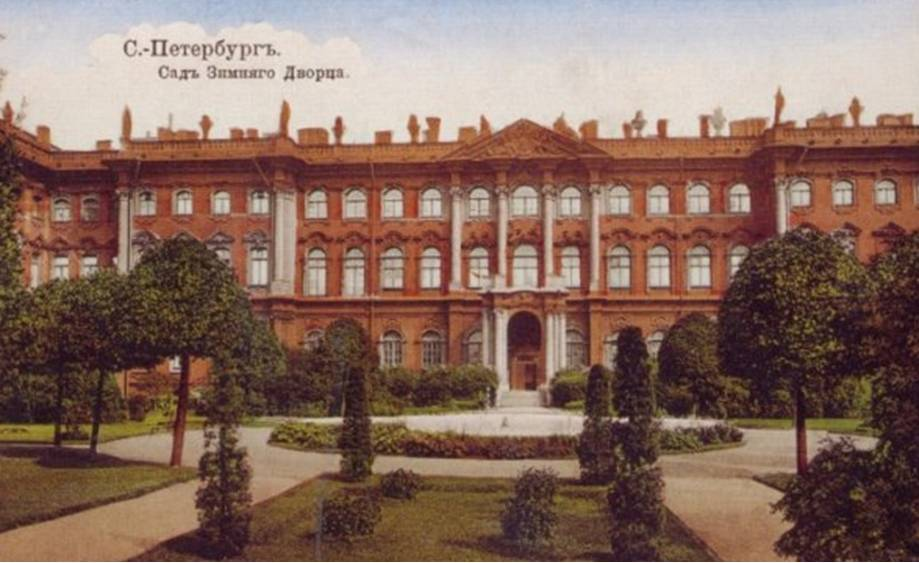
The private Wing of the Winter Palace, photographed circa 1900, from Tsaritsa Alexandra's new garden. The door at the centre is the Saltykov Entrance.

The Private Apartments of the Winter Palace are sited on the piano nobile of the western wing of the former imperial palace, the Winter Palace in St Petersburg. Access to the private rooms, for members of the imperial family, from the exterior was usually through the Saltykov Entrance (centre in the photograph to the right) which was reserved for use by only the Tsar, Tsaritsa and grand dukes and grand duchesses. A second access was through a discrete box-like porch, on the western end of the palace's Neva façade. From the ground floor, it can be accessed from the October Staircase, formerly known as His Majesty's Own Staircase; this double-flighted imperial staircase was a secondary entrance to the private apartments, and provided a more convenient route to the palace's ground floor and private entrances than the more formal and ceremonial public route through the state apartments. During the October Revolution of 1917, this was the entrance by which the revolutionaries gained access to the palace in order to arrest the Provisional Government in the small private dining room. Since that date it has been known as the October Staircase and has a plaque commemorating the event. Despite its size and grandeur, the October Staircase was a secondary staircase, the Jordan Staircase being the principal.

From the palace's more formal rooms, the private apartments are entered through the rotunda, a circular room which served as an ante and waiting room for those to be received by the Tsar. Another entrance is from the Malachite Drawing Room, which served as both a private and state room, and was often the assembly point for the beginning of imperial processions from the neighbouring Arabian Hall which led to the principal state apartments – particularly for imperial weddings, when the bride would be formally dressed in the Romanoff wedding regalia by the Tsaritsa in the Malachite Drawing Room.

The private rooms overlook a lawned and wooded garden, created from a former parade ground by Alexandra Feodorovna, the last Empress of Russia, who wanted a private place for her children to play.

Until 1917, this wing was rather like a private house within a palace; it was used by the imperial family whenever in residence. Following a severe fire in 1837 when most of the palace was destroyed, the private apartments were rebuilt in various styles according to the tastes of their intended, individual occupants, the immediate family of Tsar Nicholas I; thus they are an array of eclectic styles and loose interpretations of earlier 18th century tastes and fashions. During the reigns of the following three Tsars many changes were made in decoration and use, but the layout remained essentially unchanged. In 1904, enhanced in December 1904 by Bloody Sunday, the last Tsar Nicholas II and his family abandoned the Winter Palace in favour of the more private and more secure Alexander Palace at Tsarskoye Selo. From this date until the fall of the monarchy, the Winter Palace was used only for formal state occasions.

It was in the Private wing of the Winter Palace, following the February Revolution of 1917, that the Russian Provisional Government established itself. A few months later during the October Revolution this was the area of the palace most damaged during the famous Storming of the Winter Palace, a defining moment in Russia's history.

The plan used (right) is based on the arrangement of rooms prior to 1917; it has since been altered to accommodate the palace's use today as part of the complex of buildings which comprise the State Hermitage Museum. Many of the former private rooms are not regularly open to the public, or have been much changed.

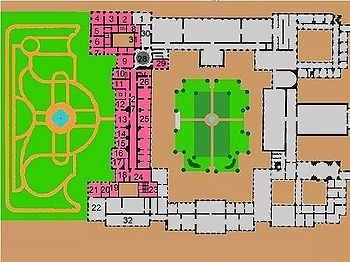
The piano nobile of the Winter Palace. The private apartments are shaded pink. Rooms are given their pre-1918 titles. (Note: This plan is not to scale and is intended only to illustrate approximate placement of the rooms.) 1: Malachite Drawing Room; 2: Empire Drawing Room; 3: Silver Drawing Room; 4: Alexandra Feodorovna's study; 5: Bedroom of Alexandra Feodorovna; 6: Boudoir; 7: Nicholas II's study; 8: Pompeii Dining Room; 9: Gothic Library; 10: Billiard Room; 11: Tsar's Audience Room 12: Saltykov Staircase 13: Nicholas II's bedroom 14: Alexander II's study; 19: Bedroom of Maria Alexandrovna; 20: Crimson Boudoir; 21: Crimson cabinet; 22: Gold Drawing Room; 23: HM's Own Staircase; 25: Dining Room; 26: Schoolroom; 28: The Rotunda; 29: Chapel; 30: Arabian Hall; 31: Winter Garden; 32: White Hall.

== Apartments of Nicholas I and Alexandra Feodorovna ==
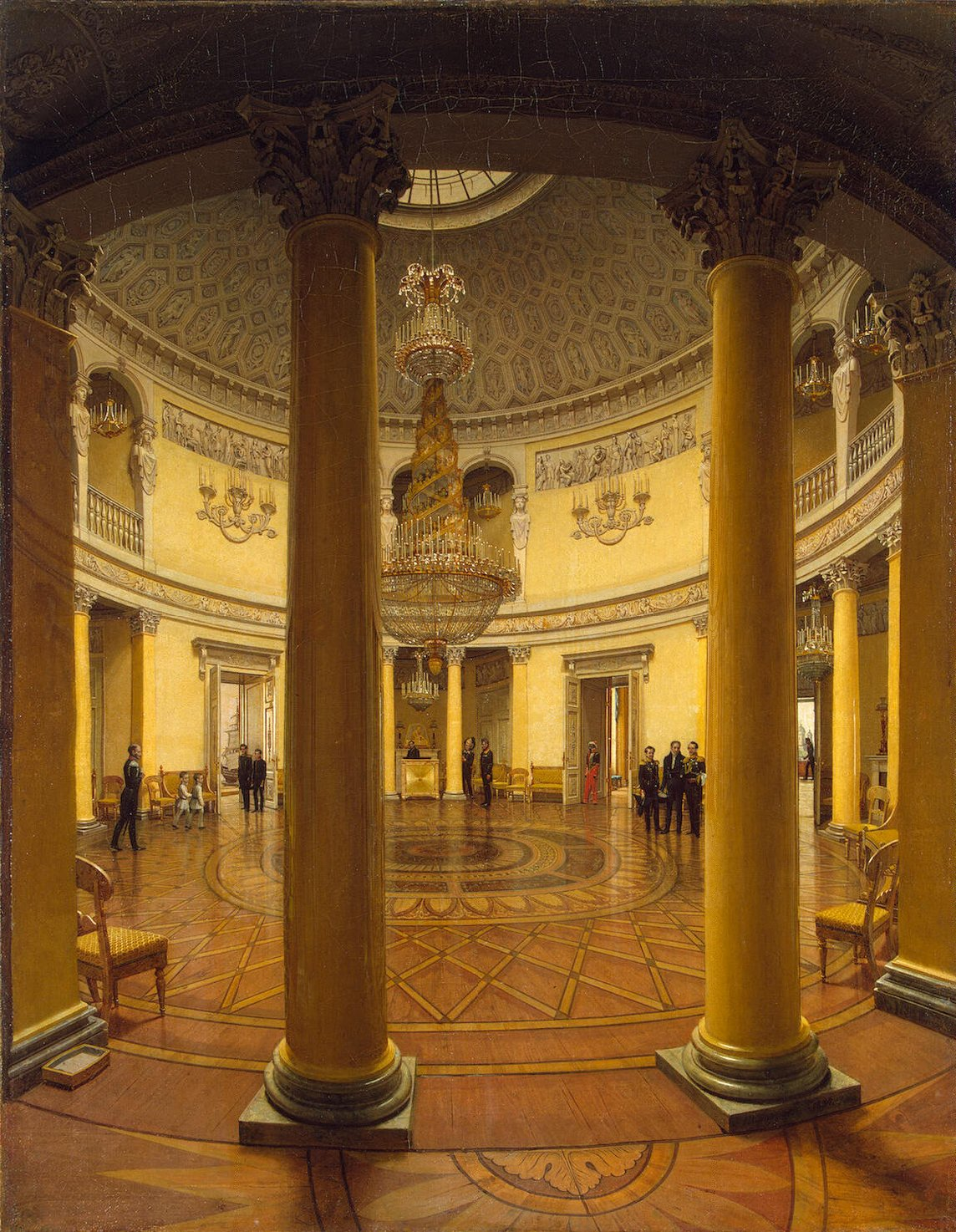
The Rotunda (28 on the plan). This circular, domed hall, dating from the early 19th century, links the state and private rooms of the palace, and in its design represents the final and neoclassical stage of the palace's evolution.

The apartments of Nicholas I and his wife, Alexandra Feodorovna, were in the northwest corner of the palace, a suite traditionally occupied by the monarch since the time of Catherine the Great, and now form part of the Apartments of Nicholas II and Alexandra Feodorovna. Catherine the Great had her throne room here, before Giacomo Quarenghi completed the building of the larger St George's Hall in the eastern wing in 1787, suggesting that rooms were formerly less intimate and private than they latterly became. During the 1780s, the interior design of the palace was changed from the ornate rococo designed by Francesco Rastrelli to the simpler Neoclassical decoration still prevalent in the state rooms today; the private rooms, however, seem to have been frequently redecorated according to the (often simple) tastes of their occupants; and in terms of decoration, luxury and use they do not correspond to the Petit appartement du roi at Versailles or to the Private Apartments at the Hofburg Palace, in Vienna, or at Windsor Castle.

Following the fire of 1837, Nicholas I was responsible for the rapid rebuilding of the palace. He insisted that the exterior remain unchanged, but allowed large parts of the interior to be redesigned in a variety of tastes and styles, leading the palace to be described as "A 19th-century palace inspired by a model in rococo style."

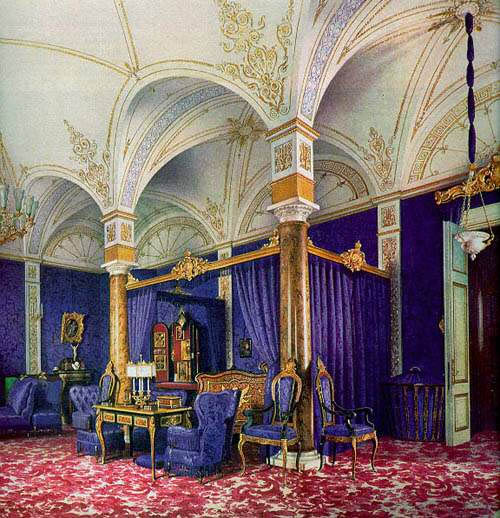
The bedroom of Tsaritsa Maria Alexandrovna

Several eminent architects were employed to rebuild the palace, most notably Vasily Stasov, who was charged with the rebuilding of the state rooms in identical or similar styles to that which had been before, and Alexander Brullov. It is Brullov who is most closely associated with the private apartments. Able to work competently in a variety of styles, his commission was to rebuild the private and semi-private rooms according to the tastes of their intended occupants.

The architects involved in the rebuilding of the palace were able to take advantage of construction developments not available to Rastrelli and Quarenghi in their original plans. Following the fire, it was discovered that large quantities of wood and hidden voids had been one of the reasons the fire had spread so drastically. In order to avoid a repeat of this, hidden behind the new but classical façades, the architects were able to use the latest techniques in building. These included the large-scale use of steel to support the vast ceiling spans of the Baroque state rooms, avoiding the need for supporting columns. However, in the smaller rooms the ceilings were built with less flammable brick vaults, which were to have a significant effect on Brullov's decorative schemes for the private rooms. Vaulting lent itself to both Gothic and Byzantine forms of interior design. Nowhere in the palace is the Gothic more evident than in the ground floor drawing room created by Brullov in 1838 for the daughters of Nicholas I.

Later the architect Andrei Stakenschneider was employed to carry out many projects at the palace. He decorated the crimson boudoir of the Tsaritsa Alexandra Feodorovna in a Rococo revival that Quarenghi had all but eradicated from the palace 70 years earlier.

== Apartments of Alexander II and Tsaritsa Maria Alexandrovna ==
Memorial bust to Alexander II placed on the spot where he died in 1881.

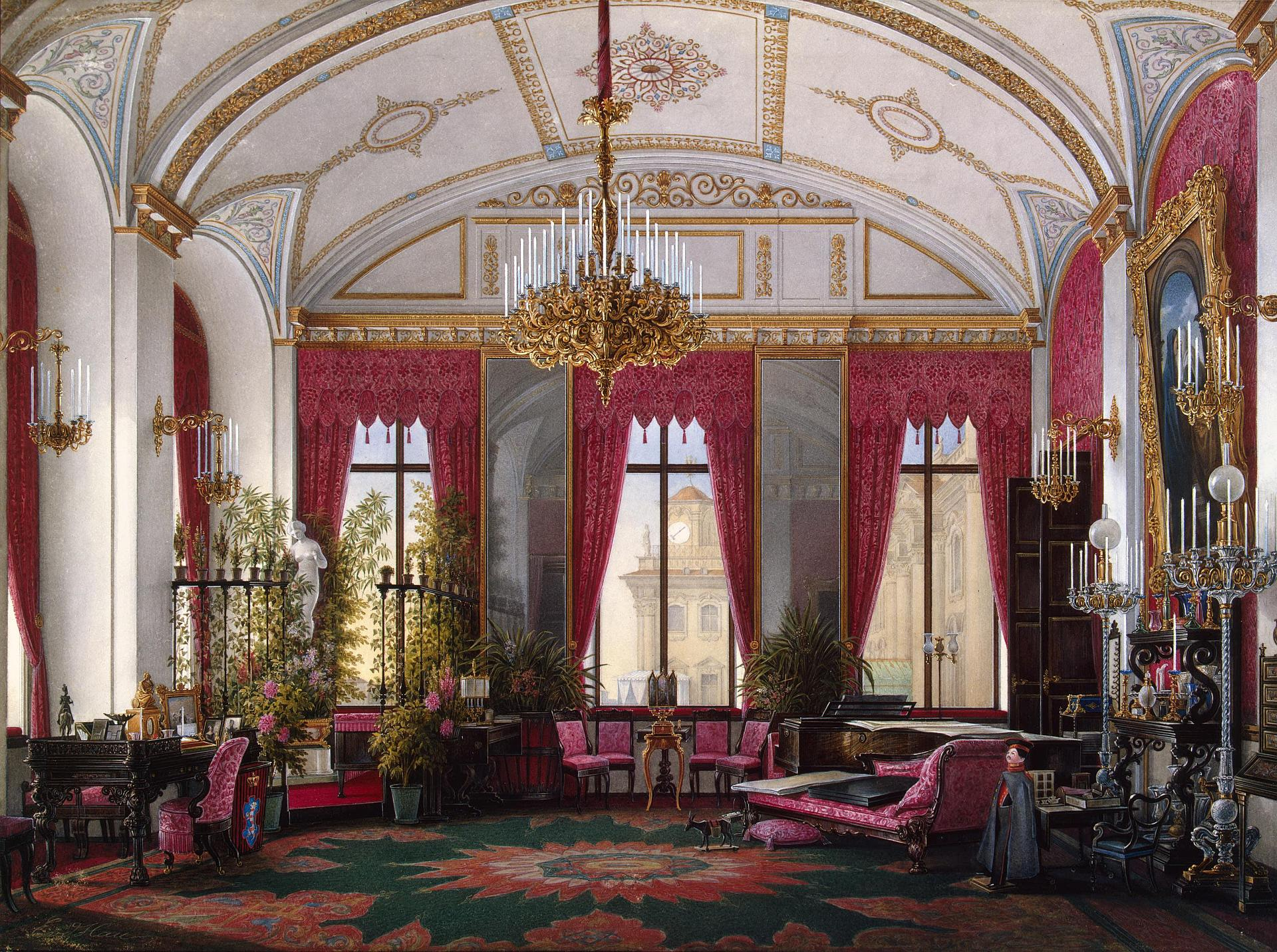
The Crimson Cabinet, the study of Maria Alexandrovna

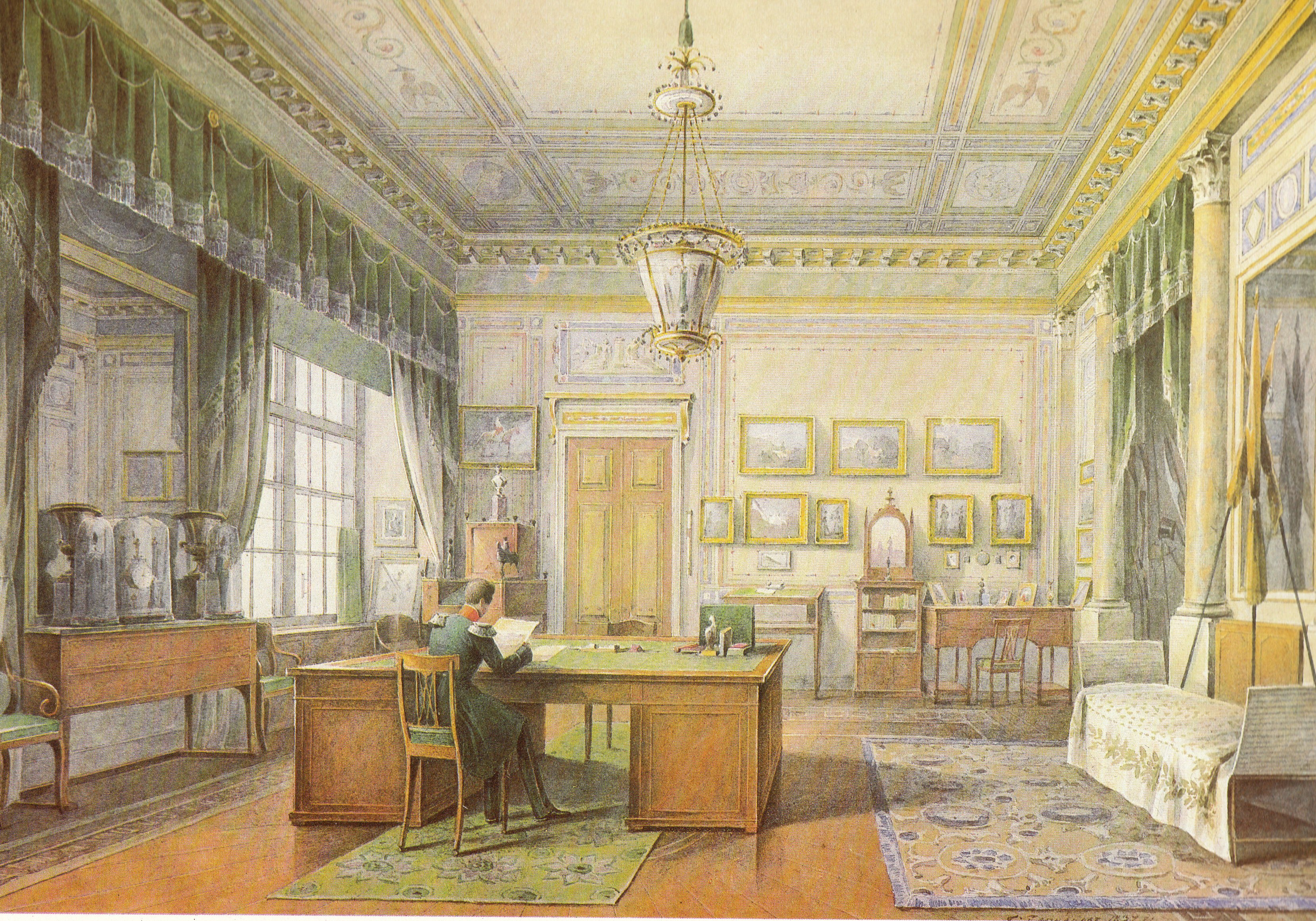
Tsar Alexander II died on the chaise longue by the columns

This suite of rooms is at the centre and southern end of the private wing, overlooking the Admiralty and Palace Square. In the apartment of the Tsaritsa, originally rebuilt by Brullov, the hand of Andrei Stackenschneider is evident. His chief distinction was an ability to combine an eclectic mix of architectural styles, frequently combining Classical, Gothic and Oriental motifs in the same scheme. This is nowhere more obvious that in the suite created for Tsaritsa Maria Alexandrovna, where the Gold Drawing Room combines all of these motifs. Maria Alexandrovna used the Gold Drawing room as her state Drawing Room with her more private rooms beyond: the Crimson Drawing Room followed by her Boudoir, before the most private of her rooms, the bedroom. Her study, in a corner of the palace, by contrast with the preceding Gold Drawing Room was simply decorated having plain white walls adorned only with gilded sconces, and a vaulted ceiling broken onto palales by gilded moulding. By contrast again, the small boudoir beyond was in an ornate rococo revival style created by the architect Harald Bosse in 1853.

=== Tsar's Study (14) ===
Until the assassination of Alexander II, this room was traditionally the Tsar's study, having been used for this purpose by both Alexander I and Nicholas I. Originally designed by Giacomo Quarenghi in 1791, the room contains a recessed alcove in the style of a Baroque state bedroom, indicative of its original use. Following the fire of 1837 it was redesigned by Alexander Brullov.

It was here, in March 1881, that the fatally wounded Alexander II was carried to die (on the chaise longue to the right of the picture). Following his death a memorial bust was placed on the spot where he died; this remains in place today. The room, like many of the private rooms, is accessed from the aptly named "dark corridor." It was along this long passageway that Maria Fedorovna in her memoirs talked of following great drips of congealed blood to find her father-in-law, the dying Tsar in his study. Alexander III and Maria Feodorovna with their family lived in the more secure Gatchina Palace, due to the several attacks to the former Tsar.

== Apartments of Nicholas II and Alexandra Feodorovna (2–10) ==
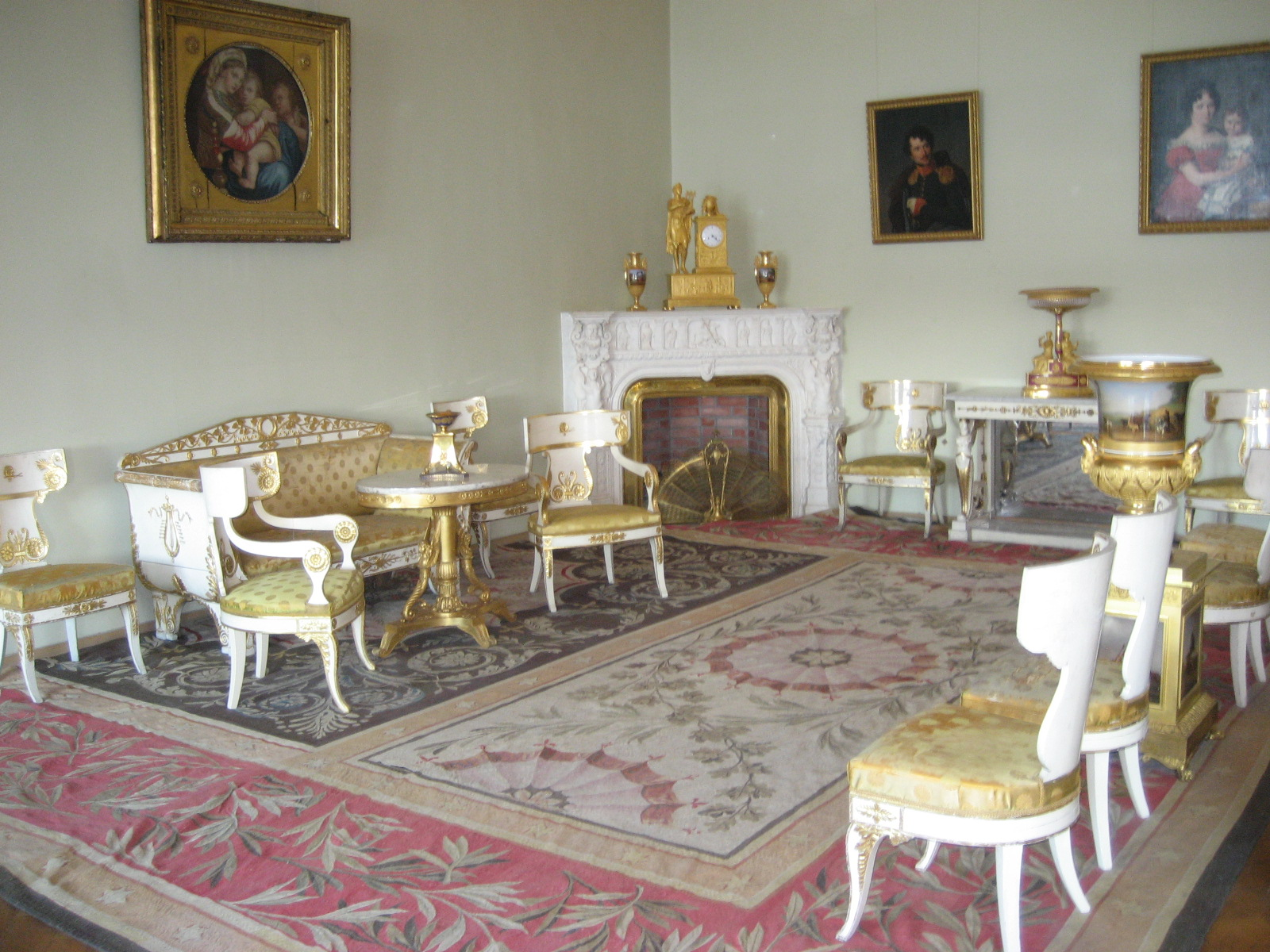
A former drawing room of the Empress Alexandra Feodorovna (room No. 4 on plan above). The marble chimney piece is a replacement.

Nicholas II ascended the throne in 1894 and married his wife, Tsaritsa Alexandra Feodorovna in the first days of his reign in a lavish ceremony at the Winter Palace. Immediately after the ceremony, his mother insisted the couple make their home with her at the Anichkov Palace. There they began their married life in six small rooms.

The Dowager Tsaritsa forbade the new Tsar and his wife to set up their own court until six months after her husband's death. (Note: In Russia, the Tsar's mother took precedence over his wife.) Therefore, it was not until May 1895, when the Dowager went to Copenhagen, that the couple could set up their own household, but it was first a small palace at Peterhof and then the Alexander Palace in the imperial compound at Tsarskoe Selo, which even at this early stage in their marriage and reign became their near-permanent home.

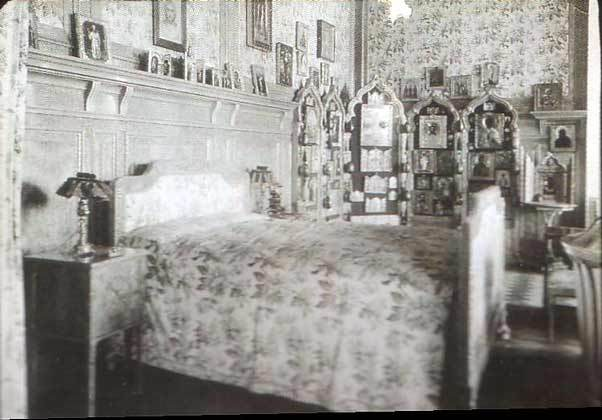
The bedroom of Nicholas II and Alexandra Feodorovna photographed in 1900.

From December 1895, however, the Tsar and Tsaritsa did reside for periods during the winter at the Winter Palace. They extended and redesigned the rooms which had been prepared for Nicholas, as Tsarevich two years earlier. The architect Alexander Krasovsky was commissioned to redecorate a suite of rooms in the northwest corner of the palace. He lowered many of the vaults, the flatter ceilings creating a more intimate atmosphere. He often employed a different era as the theme for each room, ranging from medieval to rococo and art nouveau. In style and content, the suite was intended to epitomise the domestic ethic of the couple, which was to live in an almost bourgeois fashion in small cosy home; at heart the Tsaritsa was a "hausfrau". She was criticised for her taste, which was to "make over in the style of an English gentlewoman, stuffing rooms with knickknacks and drowning them in chintz." The court was horrified that the furniture was purchased mail order from Maples of London, while her mauve boudoir (at Alexander Palace) has been described as "a horror to all who saw it."

Unlike most sovereigns of the day, Nicholas II and his wife shared a bedroom (5). From this was a large bathroom (overlooking an internal courtyard) designed by the court architect, Krasovsky, which had a sunken bath reached by eight marble steps. The bath was in a recess lined with Dresden tiles.

The Tsaritsa also created the private garden (35) beneath the windows of the private apartments on the site of a former parade ground. Before this, the only garden of the palace was the very overlooked one (32) created in the palace's principal courtyard for her mother-in-law a few years earlier. These two areas remain the only gardens of the palace.

During the reign of Nicholas II and his wife, court life was quieter than it had ever been, due to the Tsaritsa's retiring nature and mistrust of St Petersburg's high society. In the Tsaritsa's opinion: "Saint Petersburg is a rotten town, and not one atom Russian." Under her influence, gradually the great court receptions and balls at the Winter Palace, which humoured and cultivated the powerful nobility, came to an end, to be briefly replaced by theatricals held in the Hermitage which "no one enjoyed." Then even the theatricals ceased.

=== Empire (2) and Silver (3) Drawing Rooms ===
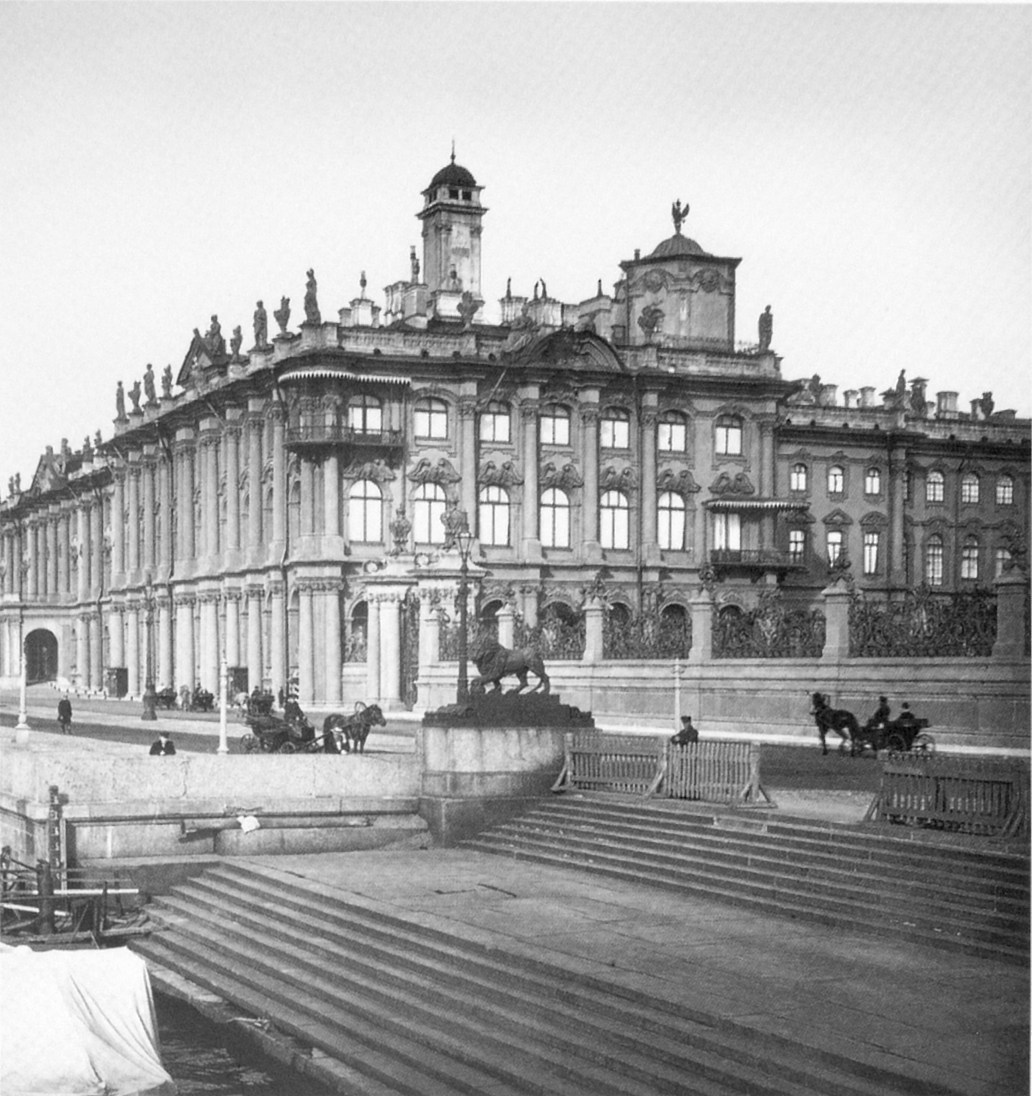
A 19th-century view of the private wing showing projecting, canopied balconies; these along with the wall surrounding the private garden have now been removed.

The Silver and Empire Drawing Rooms were part of the suite of rooms reserved for the private use of the Tsaritsa. They form an enfilade which culminates in the Malachite Drawing Room, which served as the Tsaritsa's State Drawing Room, where she gave audiences and conducted her official business. It was also in the Malachite Drawing Room that Romanov brides were traditionally robed before walking in procession through the state rooms to the palace's Grand Church for their weddings.

Originally part of the suite of Maria Feodorovna, these two drawing rooms were redesigned for Nicholas II and his wife in a French style, the Silver Drawing Room in a 19th-century interpretation of the Louis XVI style and the Empire Drawing Room in a faux Napoleonic empire style. From these rooms, the Tsaritsa was able to withdraw to still more private apartments, her boudoir, dressing room and bedroom.

=== Study/Boudoir ===
The former study or boudoir (4 on plan) of the Tsaritsa Alexandra Feodorovna (wife of Nicholas II) was redesigned for her by Alexander Krasovsky between 1894 and 1895. The room had previously formed the private suite of the wife of Nicholas I when, as her boudoir, it was decorated in red. For Nicholas I, devoted to his wife, spending an evening in this room with her was one of his favourite pastimes.

Today the room displays the work of Heinrich Gambs, a notable Russian cabinet maker of the early 19th century.

=== Gothic Library ===
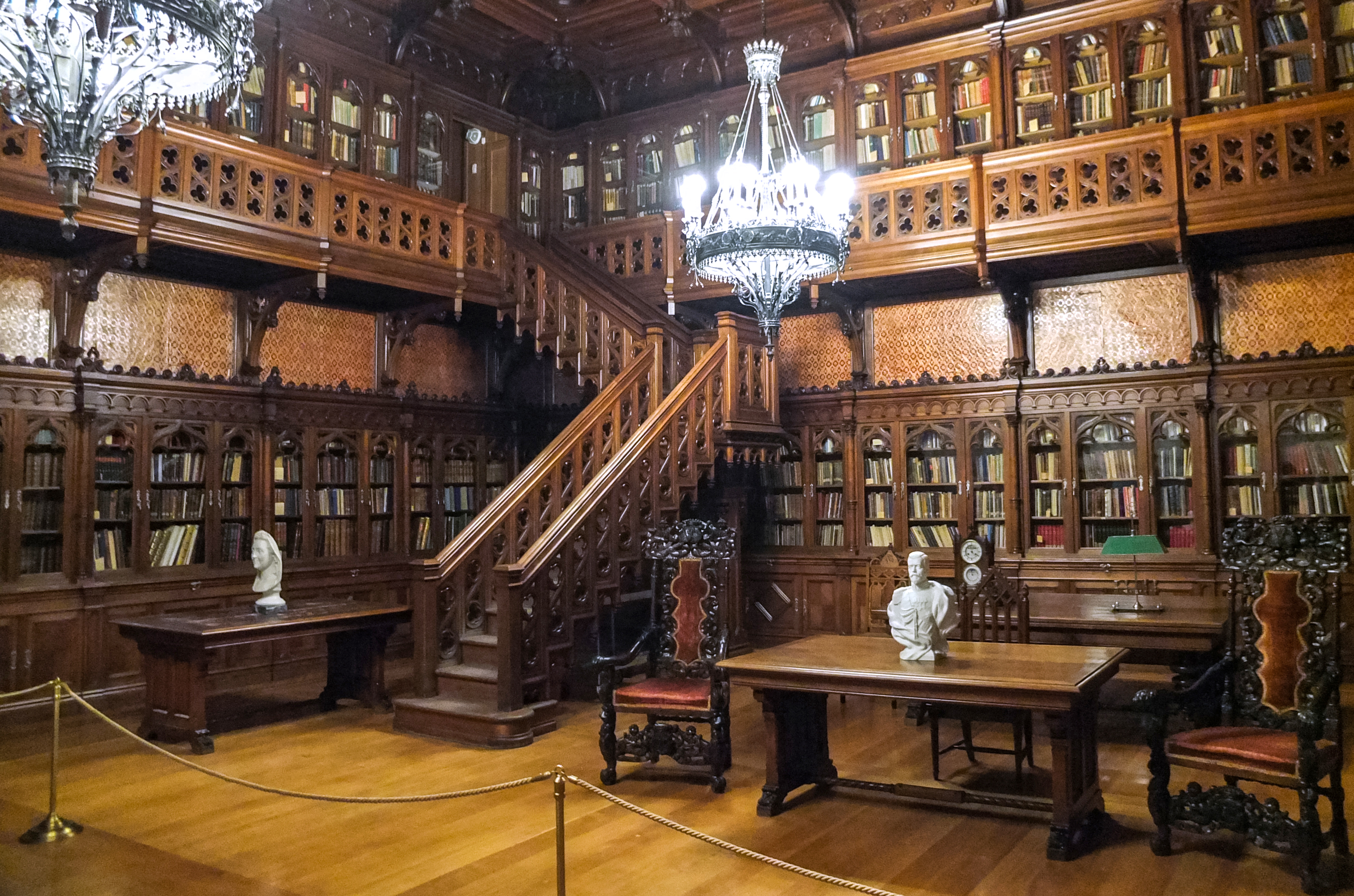
The Gothic library designed by Krasovsky for Nicholas II

The Gothic library (9 on the plan) is the largest room of the suite refurbished for Nicholas II by Krasovsky; he designed it in a form of heavy Puginesque wooden gothic, redolent of romantic perceptions of the Middle Ages. Elsewhere, he employed themes ranging from the rococo to art nouveau. The library and the small dining rooms are the only rooms to retain their Krasovsky decoration. Many of the rooms formerly belonging to Nicholas II are small, narrow, dark and awkward in design, especially Nicholas's narrow study.

=== Small Dining Room (8) ===
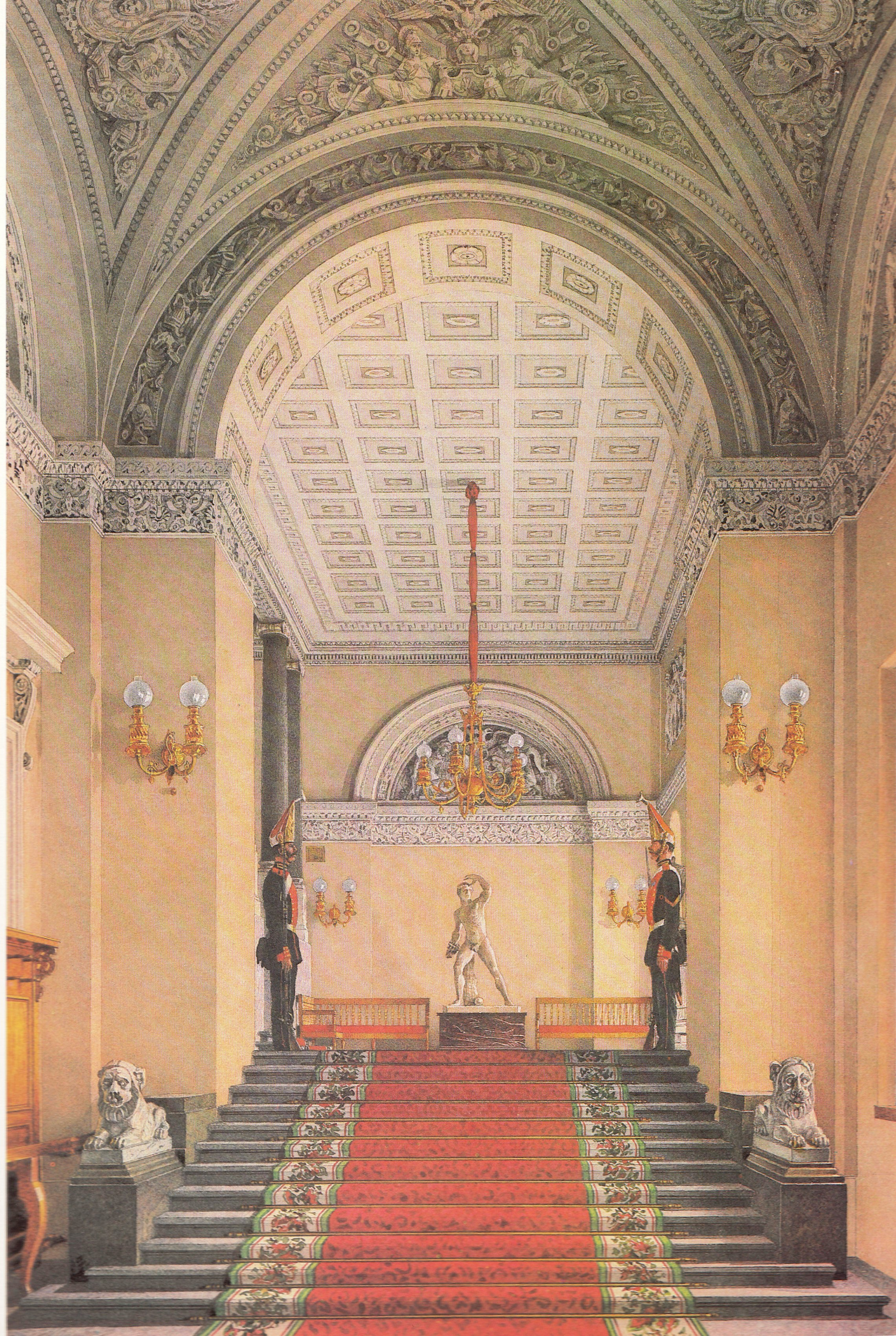
His Majesty's Own Staircase (today the October Staircase), which gives access to the private apartments from the ground floor. It was used by revolutionaries during the storming of the palace.

Formerly known as the Pompeian Dining Room, the Small Dining-room was redecorated in 1894–95 for the newly married Nicholas II and his Tsaritsa, by Krasovsky. A rococo plaster-work style was chosen to frame 18th-century St Petersburg tapestries.

Above the fireplace is a plaque recording the facts of the arrest of the Provisional Government which took place in this room on the night of 25 October 1917.

== Private apartments and the Hermitage Museum ==
Following the Government's arrest in the Small Dining Room, an eyewitness account records a systematic destruction of the apartments by the Bolsheviks:

The Palace was pillaged and devastated from top to bottom by the Bolshevik[s]...Priceless pictures were ripped from their frames by bayonets. Packed boxes of rare plate and china...were broken open and the contents smashed or carried off. The library....was forced open and ransacked.....the Tsaritsa's salon, like all other rooms, was thrown into chaos. The colossal crystal lustre, with its artfully concealed music, was smashed to atoms. Desks, pictures, ornaments—everything was destroyed.

For a brief period following the revolution, the private apartments were open to the public to display the life of the former rulers, as this was the area of the palace where entry had been gained by the revolutionaries, and as a consequence, much had been destroyed so it is hard to know how accurate the depiction of the imperial private lives could have been. Today, with the exception of the library, the rooms are simply decorated and display part of the Hermitage Museum's vast collection of art; no reference is made to their former use. Much of the art collection displayed in the palace today is not original to the Winter Palace, but has been brought from numerous other palaces and estates which were nationalised after the revolution.

== Gallery ==
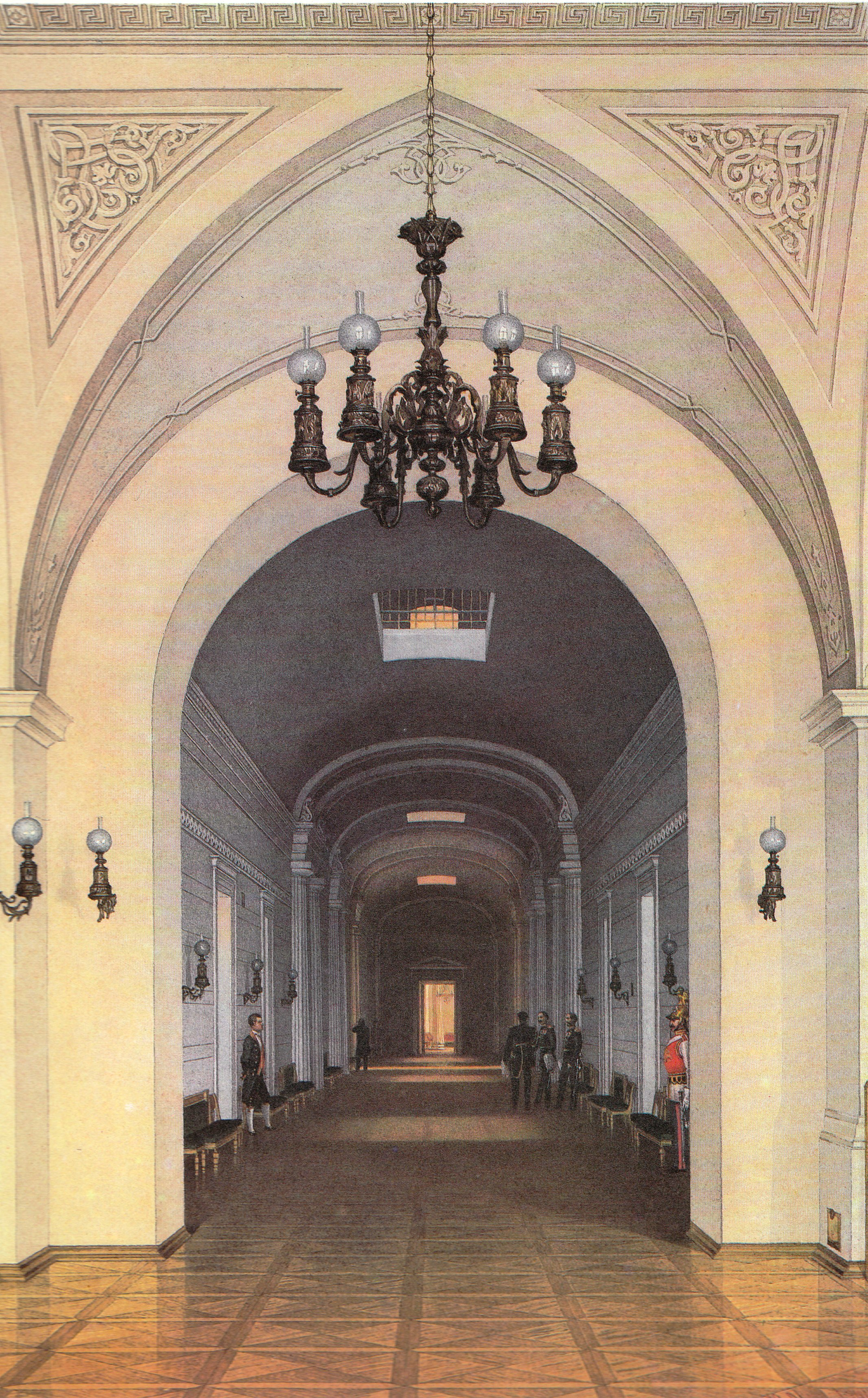
The aptly named Dark Corridor, which acts as the main artery through the private west wing

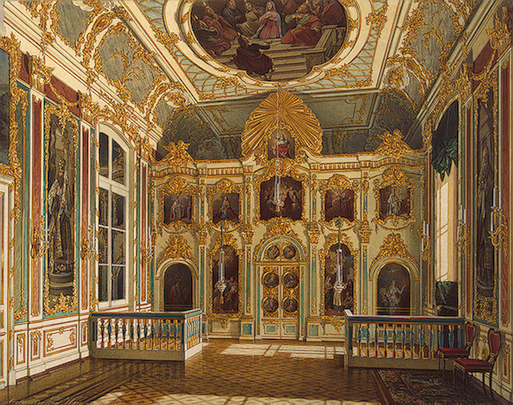
The Small Church (29 on plan). Constructed in 1768 and served as a private chapel.

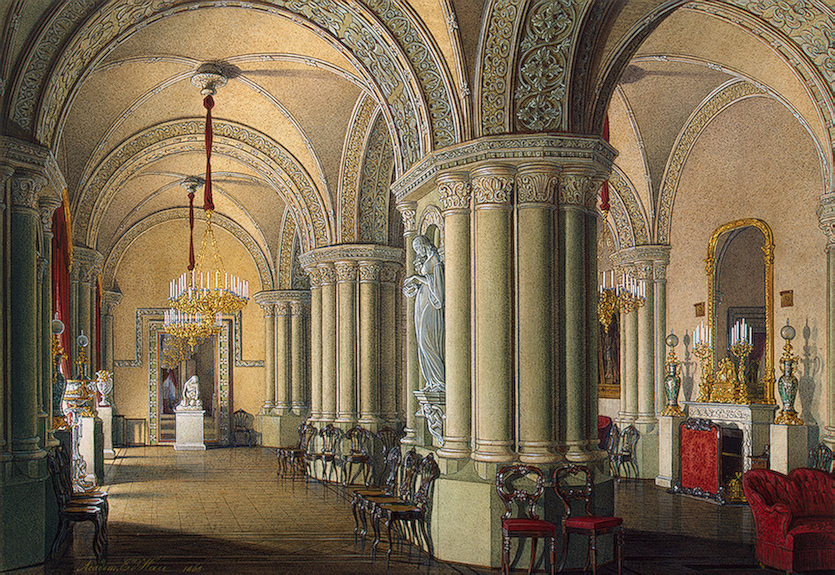
On the ground floor, the Gothic Drawing Room (under 3) was reserved for daughters of the Tsar.

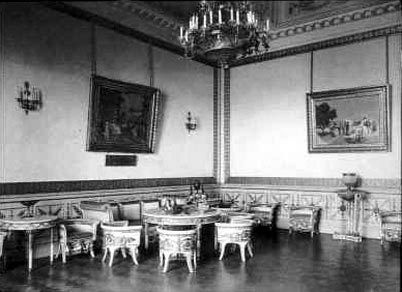
The Empire Drawing Room of Tsaritsa Alexandra Feodorovna (2)

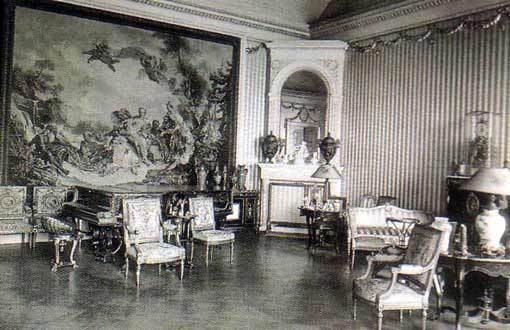
The Silver Drawing Room of Tsaritsa Alexandra Feodorovna (3)

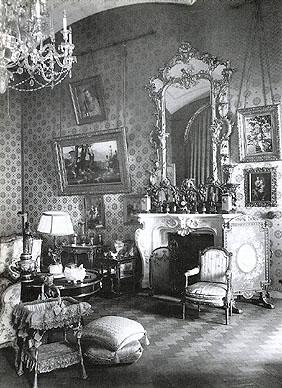
Sitting Room of Tsaritsa Alexandra Feodorovna

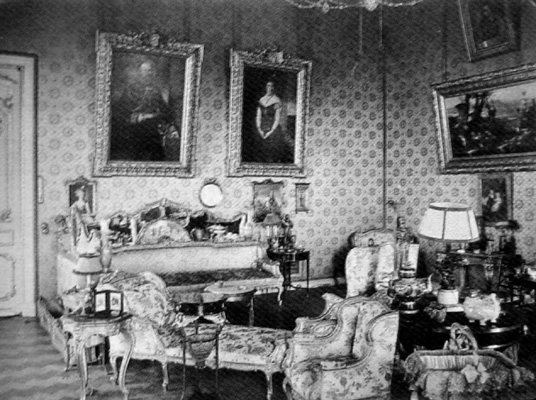
Second view of the Tsaritsa's sitting room

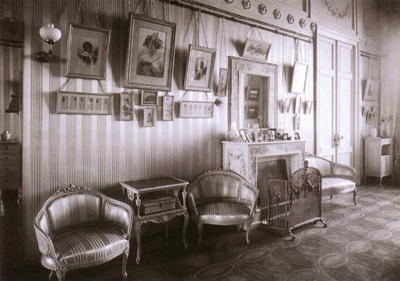
Boudoir of Tsaritsa Alexandra Feodorovna

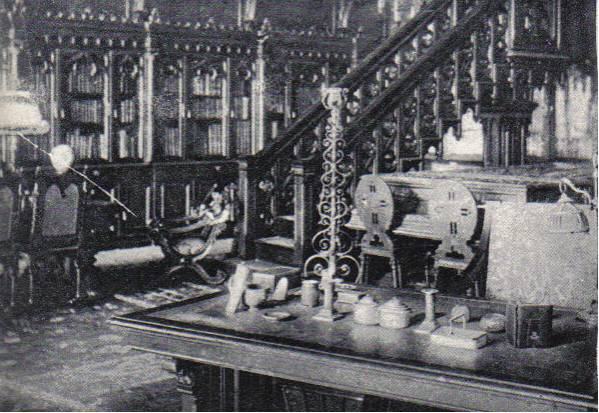
Gothic Library of Nicholas II

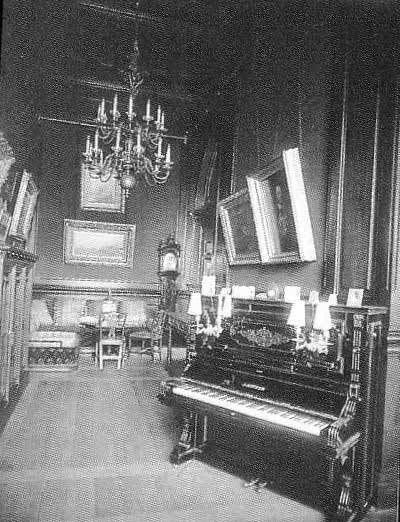
Study of Nicholas II. Sited in an internal corner of the palace, many of the rooms belonging to Nicholas II are small, narrow, dark and awkward in design, especially his study.

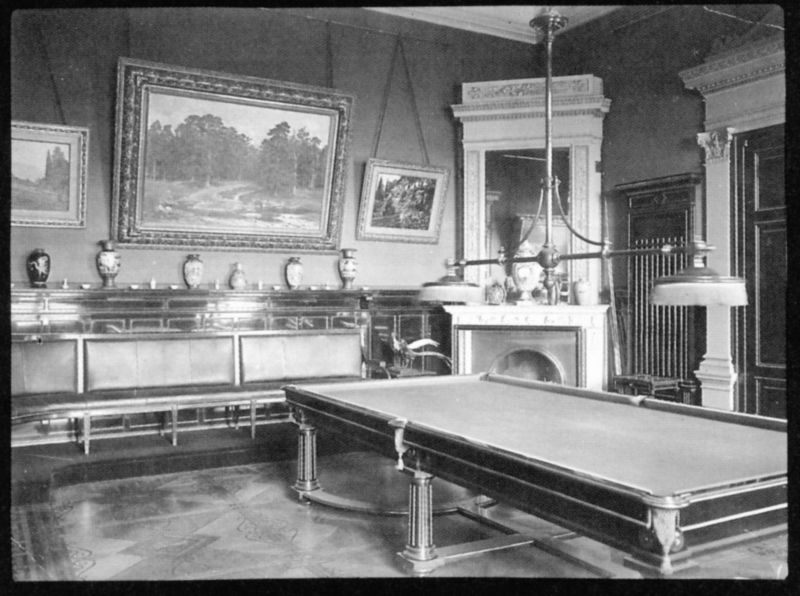
Billiards Room

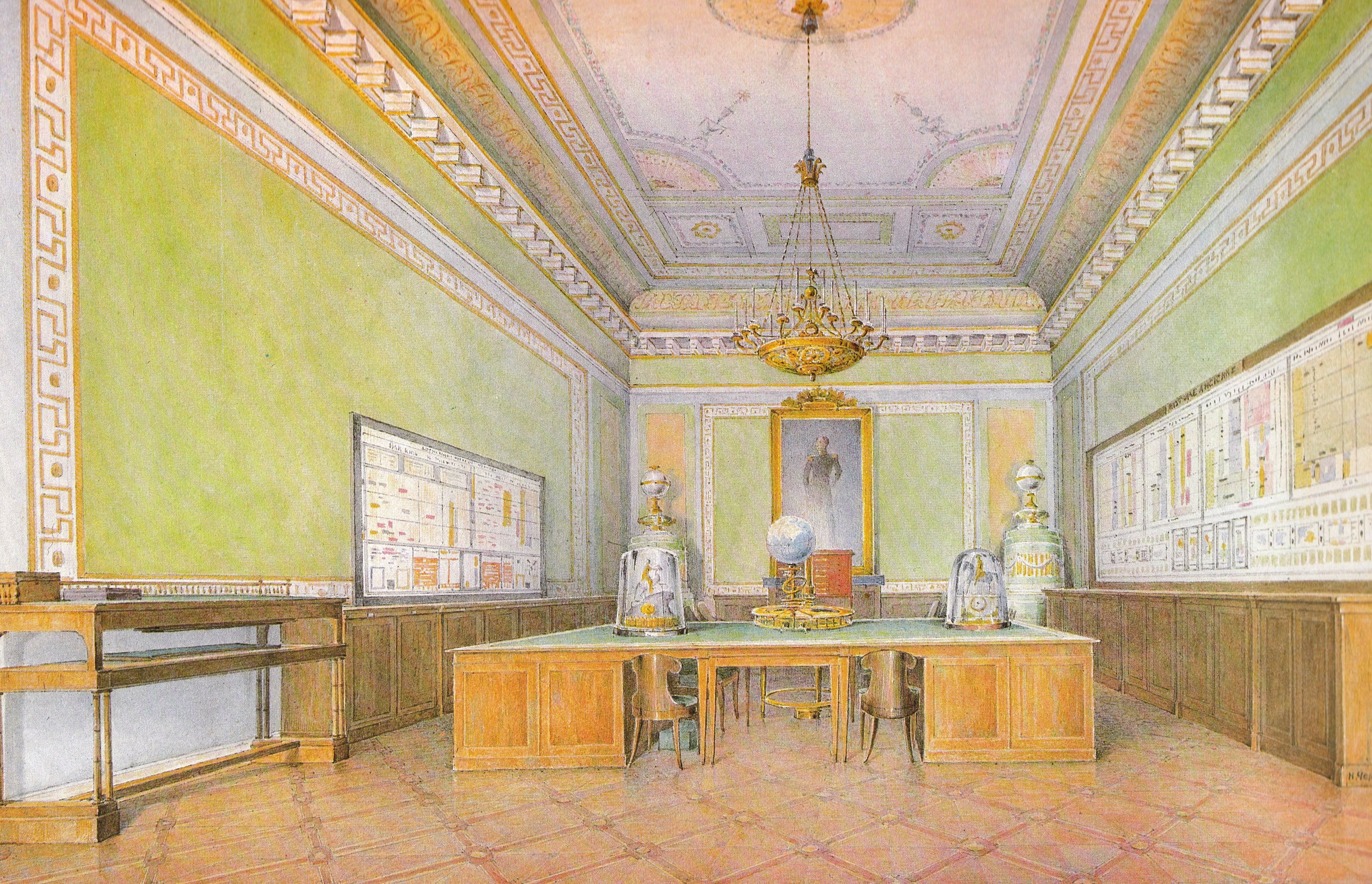
School Room (26). When young, imperial children were housed in the rooms off the Dark Corridor, facing into the principal courtyard.

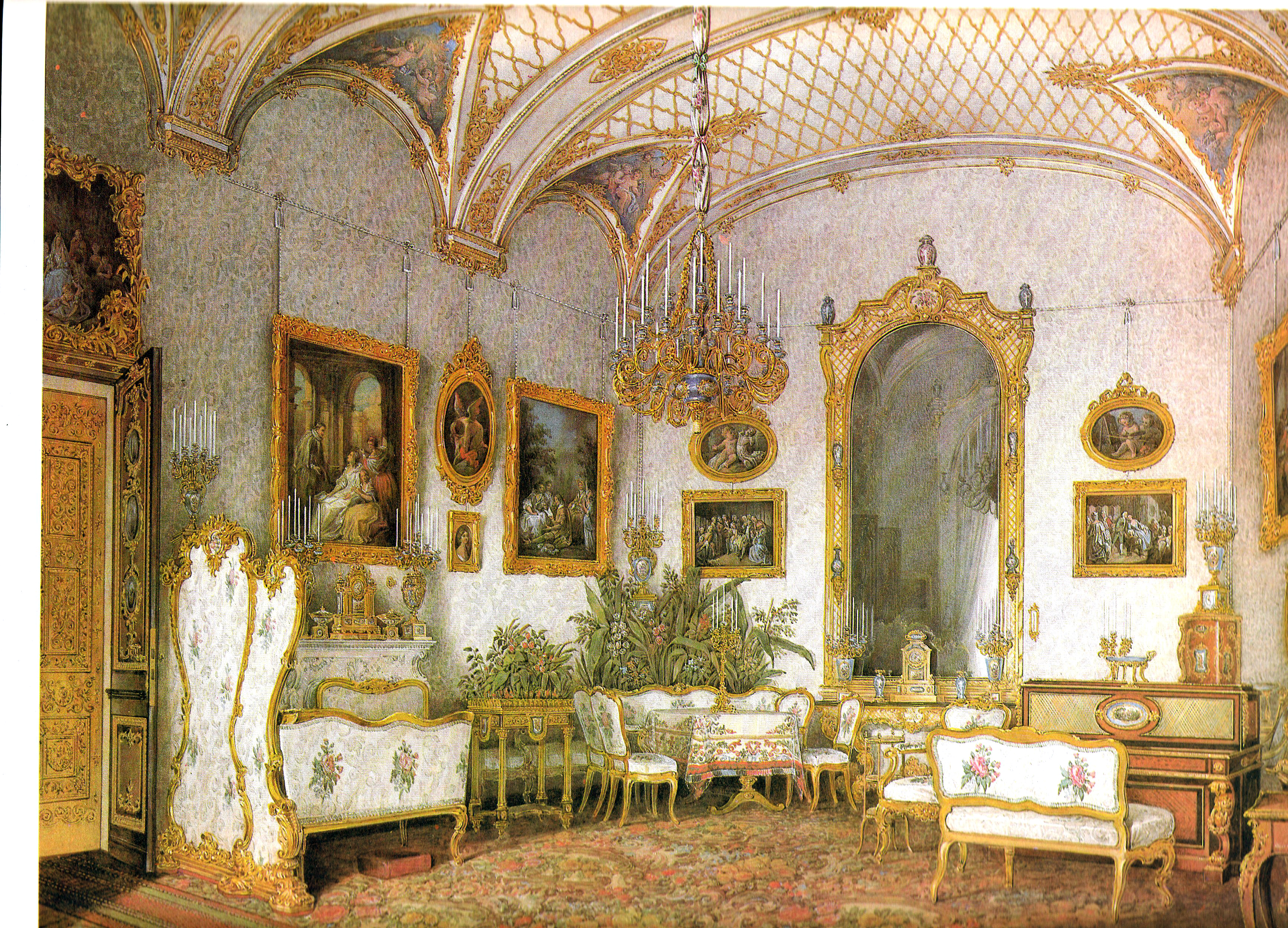
The White Drawing Room

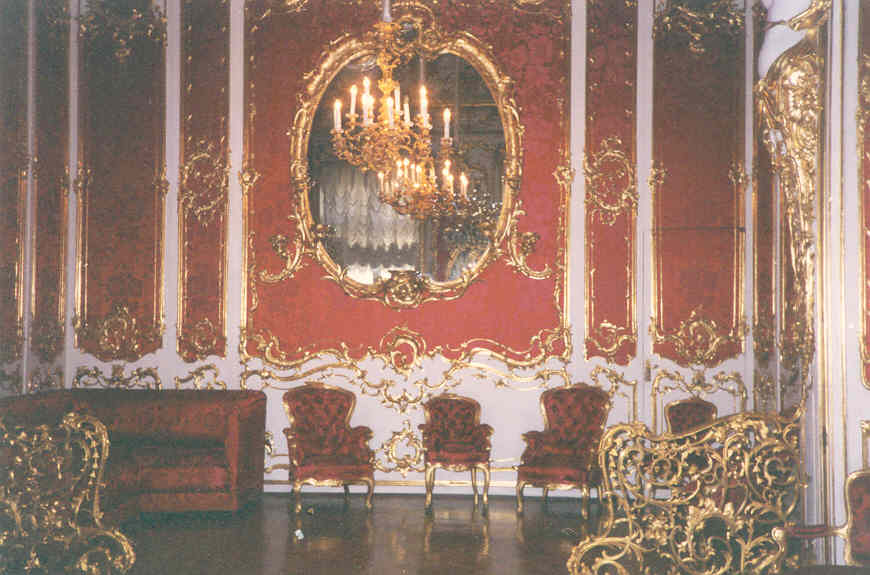
Boudoir of Tsaritsa Maria Alexandrovna
