= Gold Drawing Room of the Winter Palace =

Place in St. Petersburg, Russia

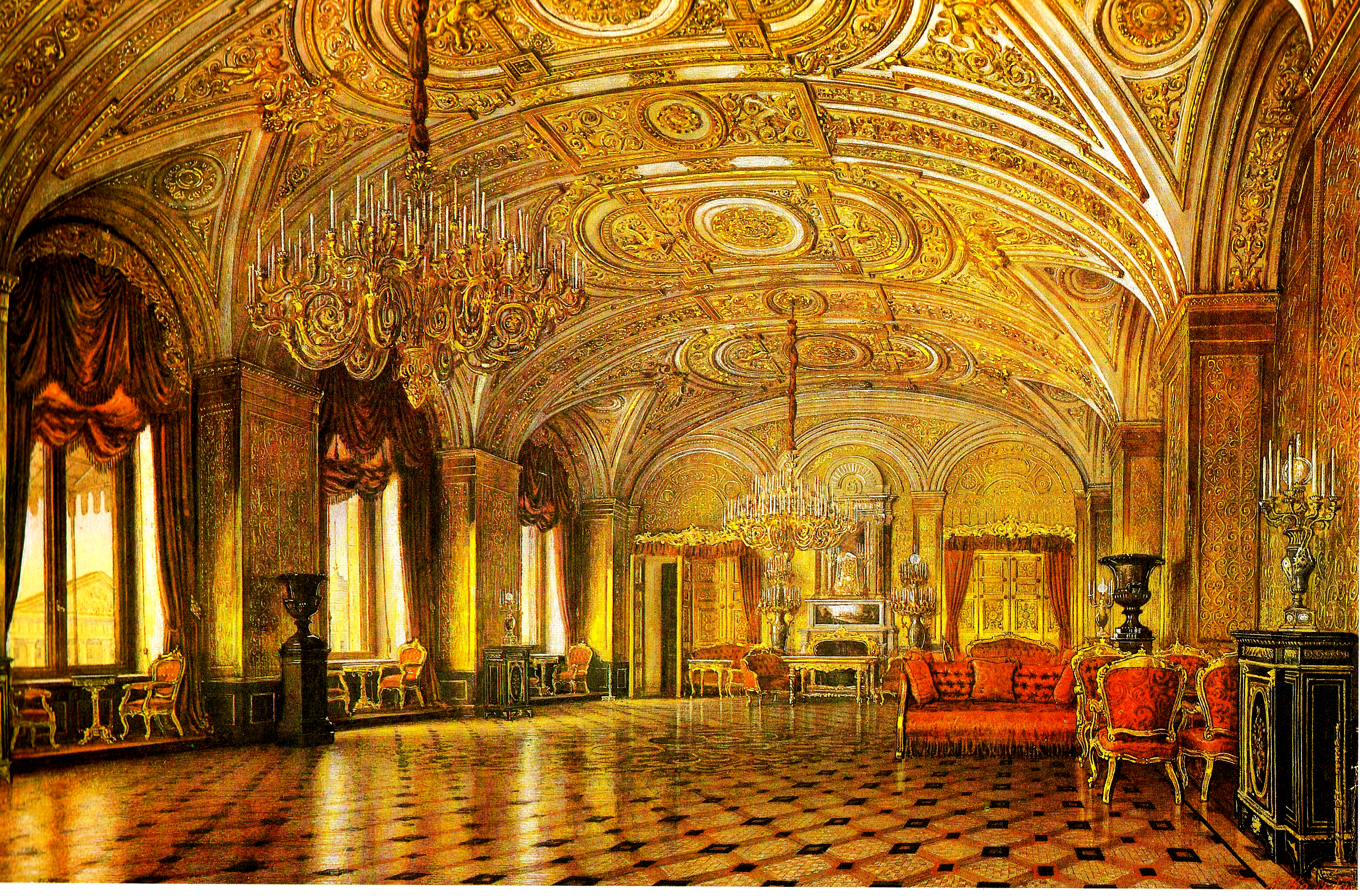
The Gold drawing Room, by Alexander Kolb (1860s).

Location of the Gold Drawing Room within the Winter Palace

The Gold Drawing Room of the Winter Palace, St Petersburg was one of the rooms of the palace reconstructed following the fire of 1837 by the architect Alexander Briullov. The vaulted ceiling and window embrasures give this large room a cavernous air.

Following her marriage in 1841, it became the most formal of the rooms comprising the suite of Tsaritsa Maria Alexandrovna. It was refurbished for her by Andrei Stakenschneider, who employed heavy gilt mouldings for the ceiling and walls in a Byzantine style. The room contains a fireplace of marble and jasper with a mosaic by Etienne Moderni. Today, as part of the State Hermitage Museum, this room retains its original decoration.

== History ==
The Gold Drawing Room was designed by Alexander Briullov in 1841. Like the adjoining The White Hall, it is the ceremonial part of Alexander II's apartments. The Throne Room of the Munich Residenz was the model for the design of The Gold Drawing Room.

All walls and pylons were covered with fine ornaments and covered with gilding. A low panel in the lower part of the walls was painted in imitation of lapis lazuli.

In 1850 the architect Andrei Stackenschneider created new curtains, cornices and a furniture set covered in crimson brocatelle.

The Golden Drawing Room was the ceremonial salon of Empress Maria Alexandrovna and a dance hall.

== Exposition ==
Since 2001, the exhibition "The Fate of One Collection. 500 Carved Stones from the Cabinet of the Duke of Orleans". The showcases display gems dating from the 4th century B.C. to the mid 18th century. - mid-18th century, once a third of the collection of the Dukes of Orleans. The collection includes cameos, Byzantine style, a large group of intaglios and cameos introduces the glyptics of Italy, France, Germany and the Netherlands in the 15th and early 18th centuries. Among the masterpieces is a portrait of Henry II of France by Alessandro Cesati.
