= Malachite Room of the Winter Palace =

Room of the Winter Palace, St Petersburg

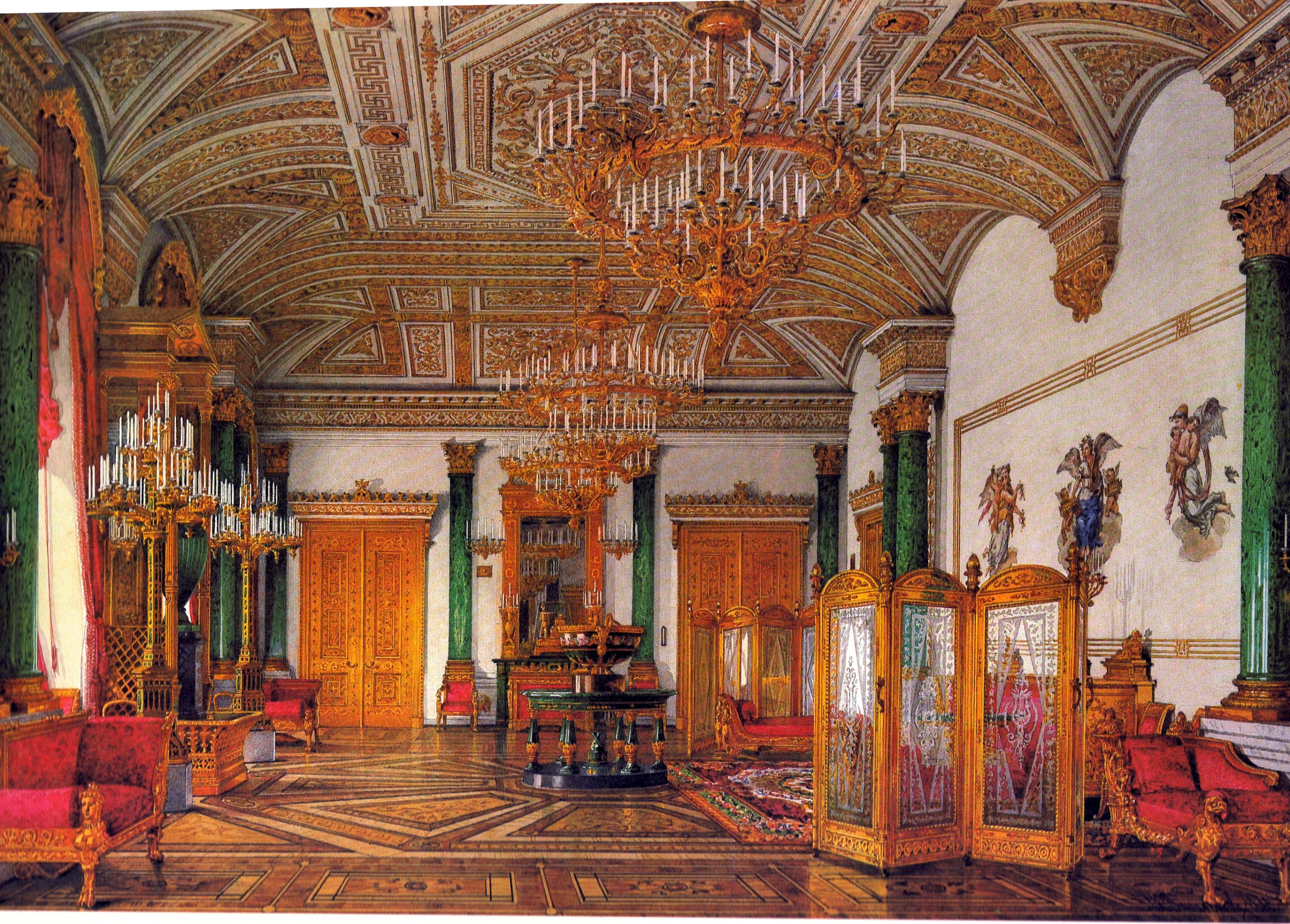
The Malachite Room, the Winter Palace, St Petersburg, by Konstantin Ukhtomsky (1865)

The Malachite Room, photographed c. 1900

Location of the Malachite Room within the Winter Palace

The Malachite Room of the Winter Palace, St Petersburg, was designed in the late 1830s by the architect Alexander Briullov for use as a formal reception room for the Empress Alexandra Fyodorovna, wife of Nicholas I. It replaced the Jasper Room, which was destroyed in the fire of 1837.

The room obtains its name from the use of malachite for its columns and fireplace. This large salon contains a large malachite urn as well as furniture from the workshops of Peter Gambs (1802-1871), son of the famous furniture maker Heinrich Gambs, which were rescued from the 1837 fire.

During the Tsarist era, the Malachite Room, which links the state rooms to the private rooms, served as not only a state drawing room of the Tsaritsa, but also as a gathering place for the Imperial family before and during official functions. It was here that Romanov brides were traditionally dressed by the Tsarina before proceeding from the adjoining Arabian Hall to their weddings in the Grand Church.

From June to October 1917 this room was the seat of the Russian Provisional Government. When the palace was stormed during the night of 7 November 1917, the members of the Government were arrested in the adjoining private dining room.

Today, as part of the State Hermitage Museum, this room retains its original decoration.
