= Rotunda of the Winter Palace =

Hall in a palace

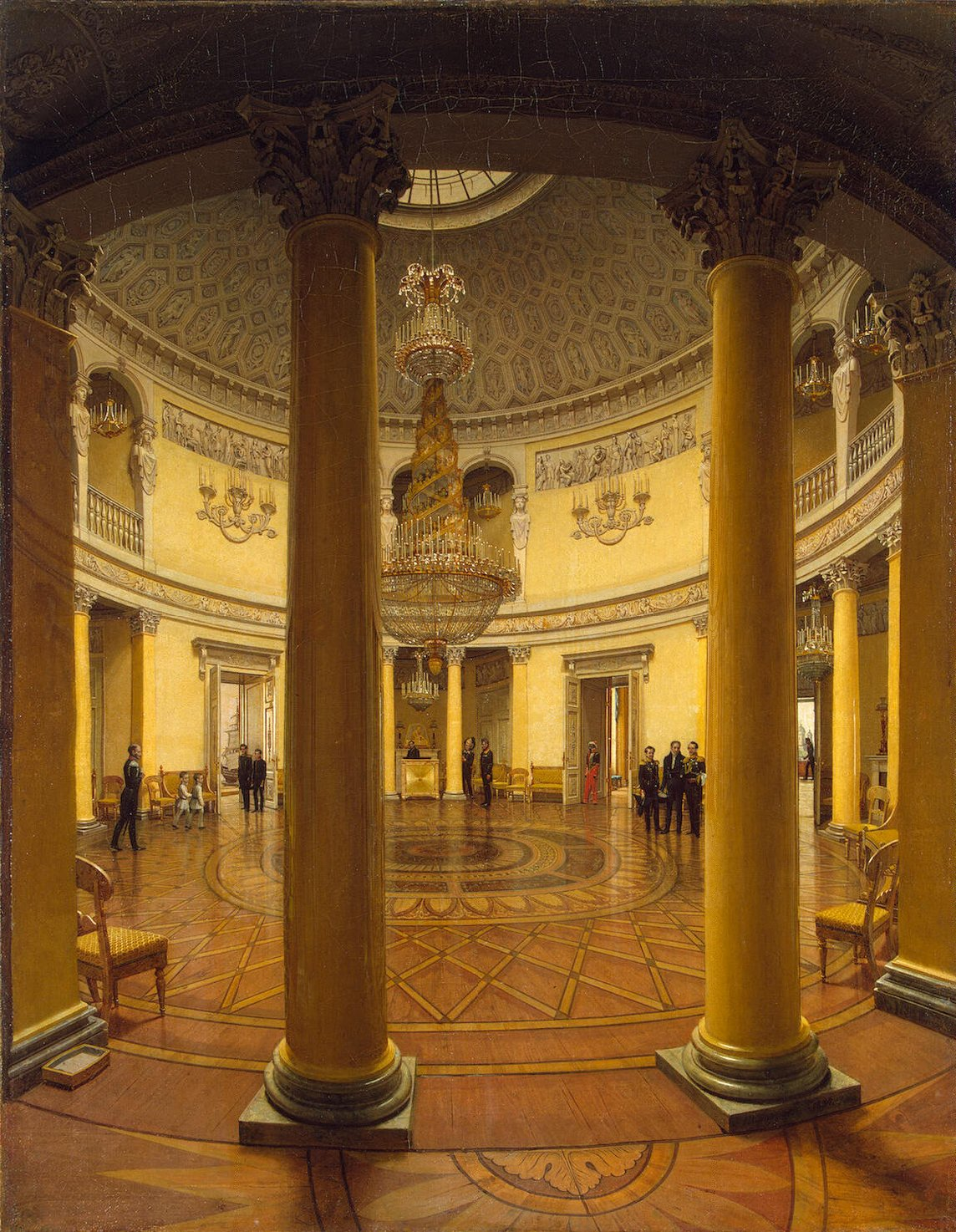
The Rotunda in 1834, by Yefim Tukharinov.

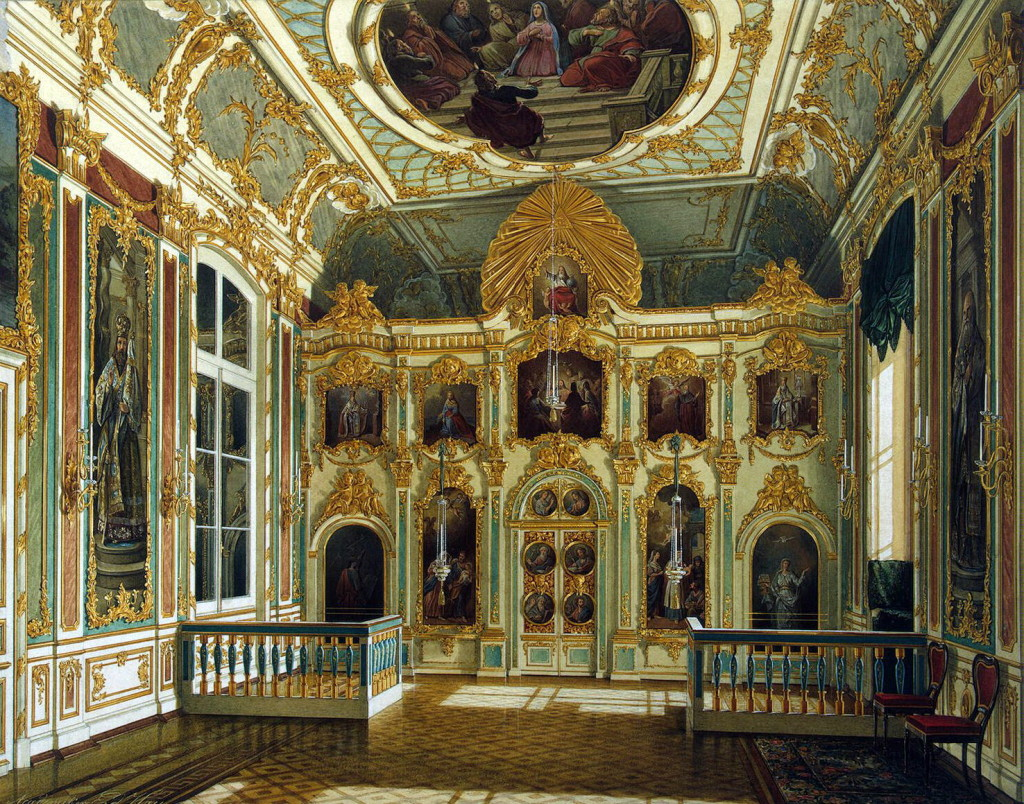
The Small Church (on plan to the right of the Rotunda, in the corner overlooking the courtyard)

The Rotunda of the Winter Palace in St Petersburg is a circular hall in the northwest wing of the palace created for Tsar Nicholas I by the architect Auguste de Montferrand. Designed in a circular neoclassical temple style, it served as an anteroom, vestibule and link between the more public state rooms of the palace and the more intimate rooms used by the Imperial family. The room is domed and top lit by an oculus.

The Rotunda was one of the many rooms destroyed by the Winter Palace fire of 1837. It was rebuilt in near-original style, but with the addition of a gallery under the dome.

Today, the Rotunda is an exhibition hall of the State Hermitage Museum.

== The Small Church ==
The Small Church is accessed from the Rotunda; formerly the private worship place of the imperial family and is not currently open to the public.
