= Pavel Brullov =

Russian painter (1840–1914)

- Павел Брюллов
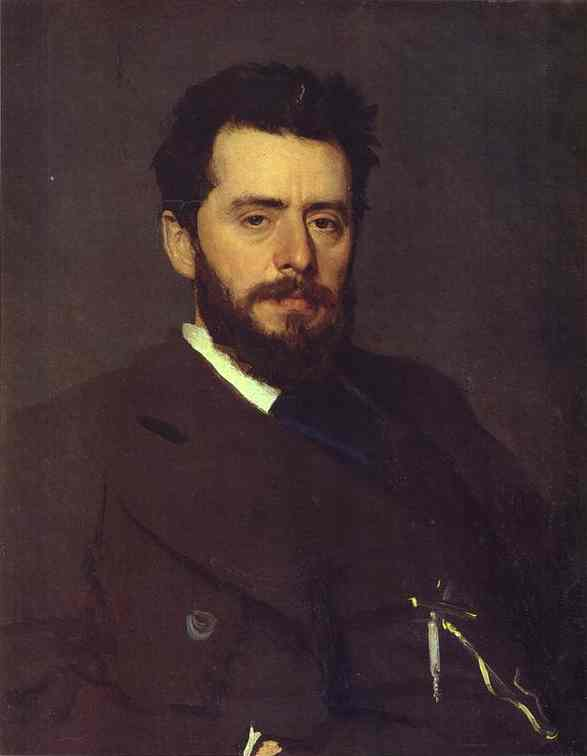
- Portrait by Ivan Kramskoi, 1879
- Born: 10 September [O.S. 29 August] 1840; Pavlovsk, Russia
- Died: 29 December [O.S. 16 December] 1914 (aged 74); Pavlovsk, Russia
- Education: Imperial Academy of Arts (1864)
- Known for: Painting
- Style: Realism
- Movement: Peredvizhniki
- Elected: Member Academy of Arts; Full Member Academy of Arts (1893)

Pavel Aleksandrovich Brullov (also spelled Briullov or Bryullov; Russian: Павел Александрович Брюллов; 10 September [O.S. 29 August] 1840 – 29 December [O.S. 16 December] 1914) was a Russian landscape painter.

== Biography ==
His father, Alexander Brullov, was a professor of architecture at the Imperial Academy of Arts and his uncle was the painter Karl Bryullov. He originally studied physics and mathematics at Saint Petersburg State University, becoming a Candidate in 1863. At the same time (from 1861 to 1864) he took classes in architecture at the academy, where he studied under Konstantin Thon, Andrei Stackenschneider, David Grimm and his father. In 1864, he graduated with the rank of "Artist Third-Degree".

Following this, he went abroad, visiting Italy, France and England. In Paris, he attended the classes of Léon Bonnat at the École des Beaux-arts. In 1870, his painting "После работы" (After Work) was awarded a medal at the Imperial Academy. From 1872 until his death, he was a member of the "Association of Travelling Art Exhibitions" (Peredvizhniki), serving as their treasurer and governing board member. In 1883, he became a full member of the academy, serving on the board after 1904. From 1897 to 1912, he was Curator of the art department at the Russian Museum.

== Selected paintings ==
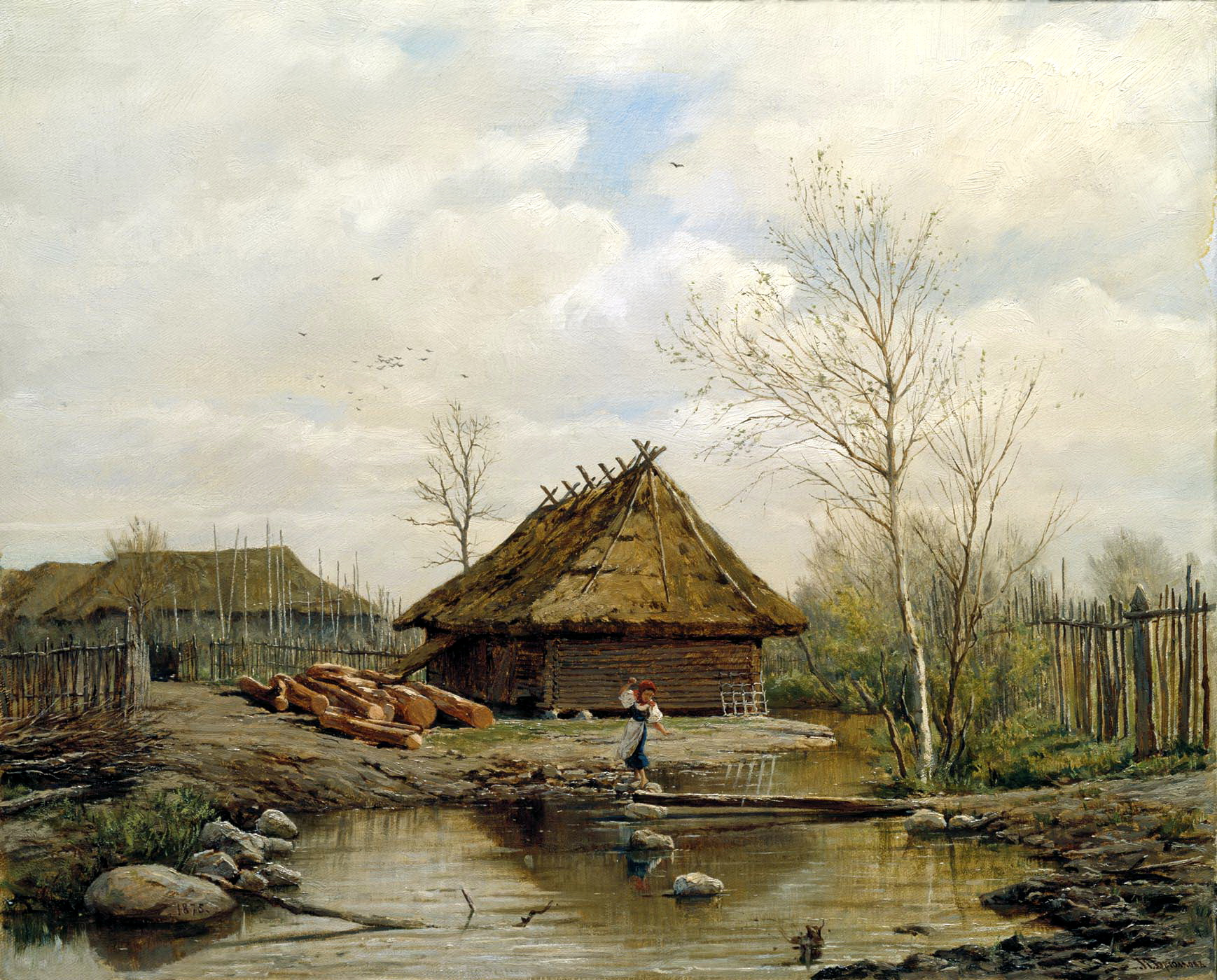
Spring (1875)

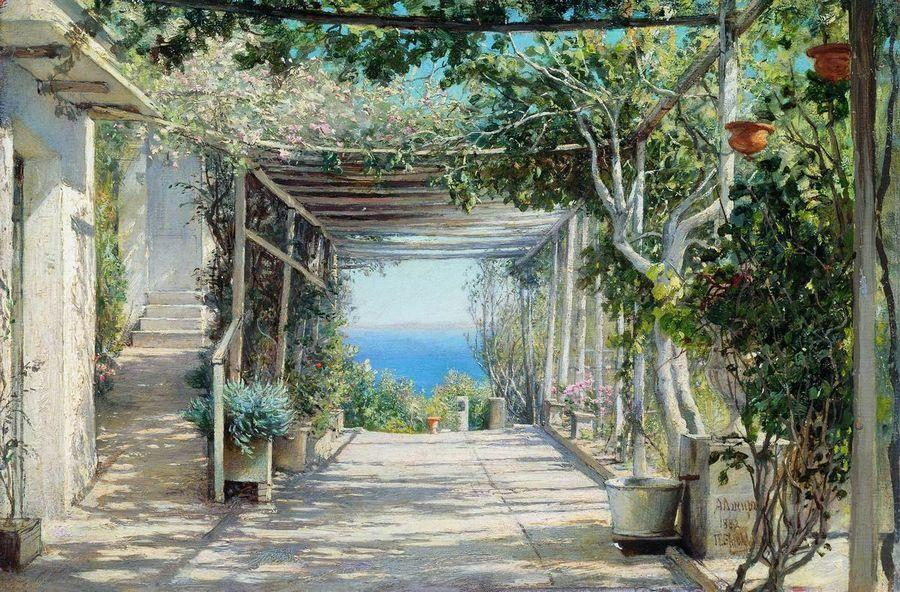
Veranda. Algeria (1882)

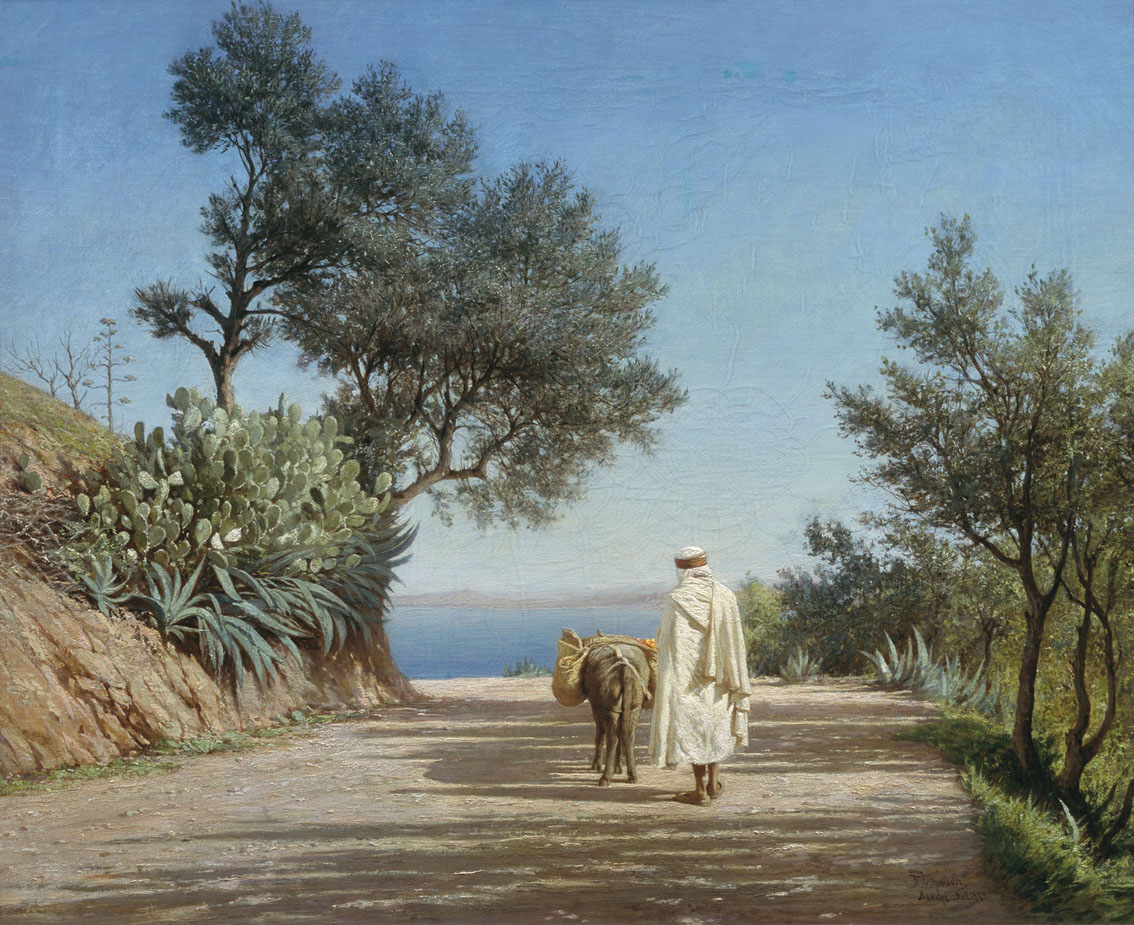
Road to the sea. Algeria (1883)

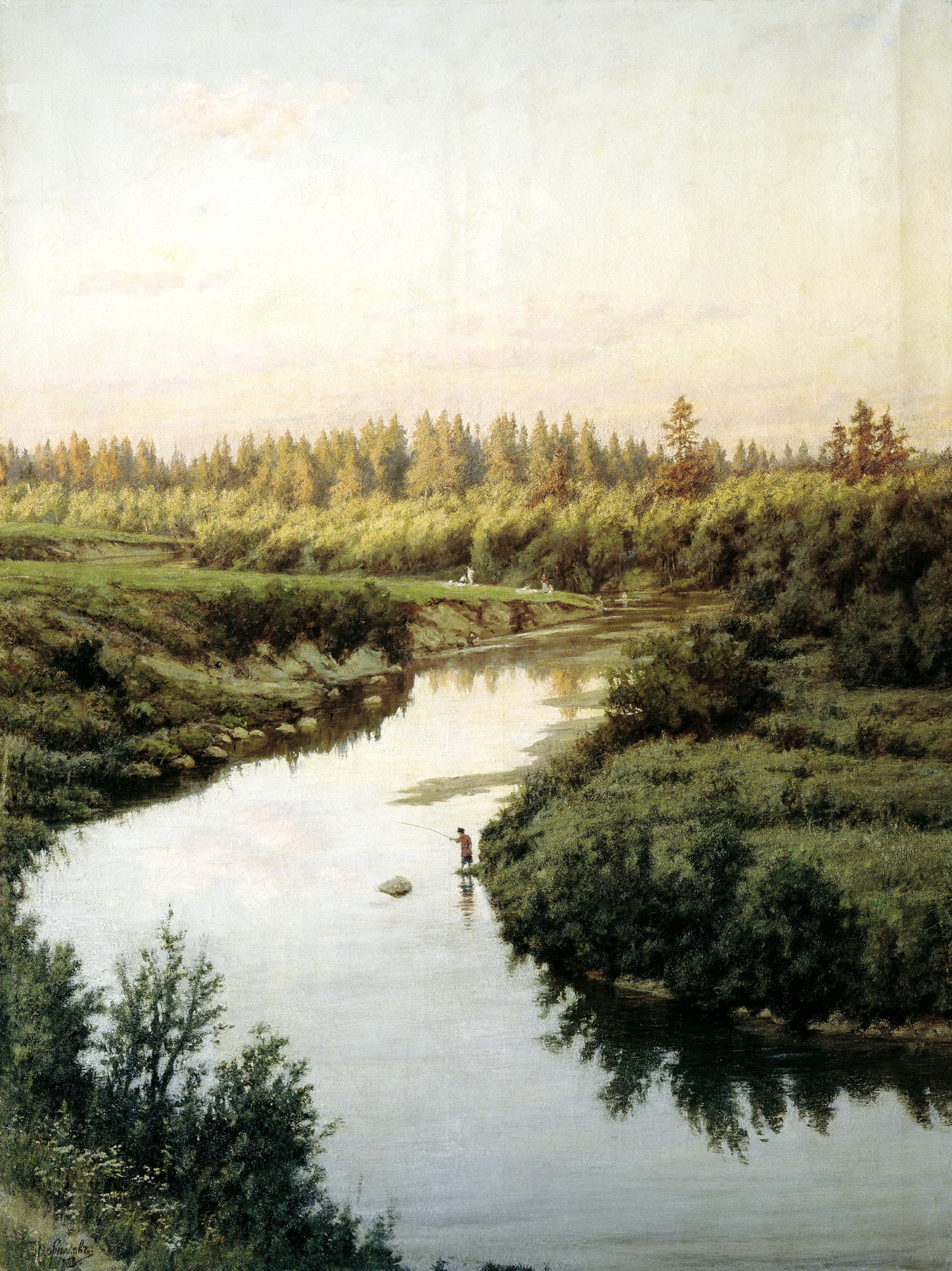
Landscape with river (1900)

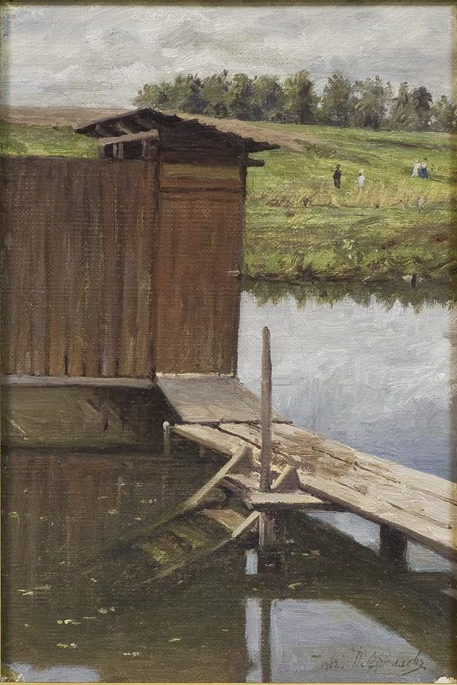
Swimming pool (1902)
