= Arabian Hall of the Winter Palace =

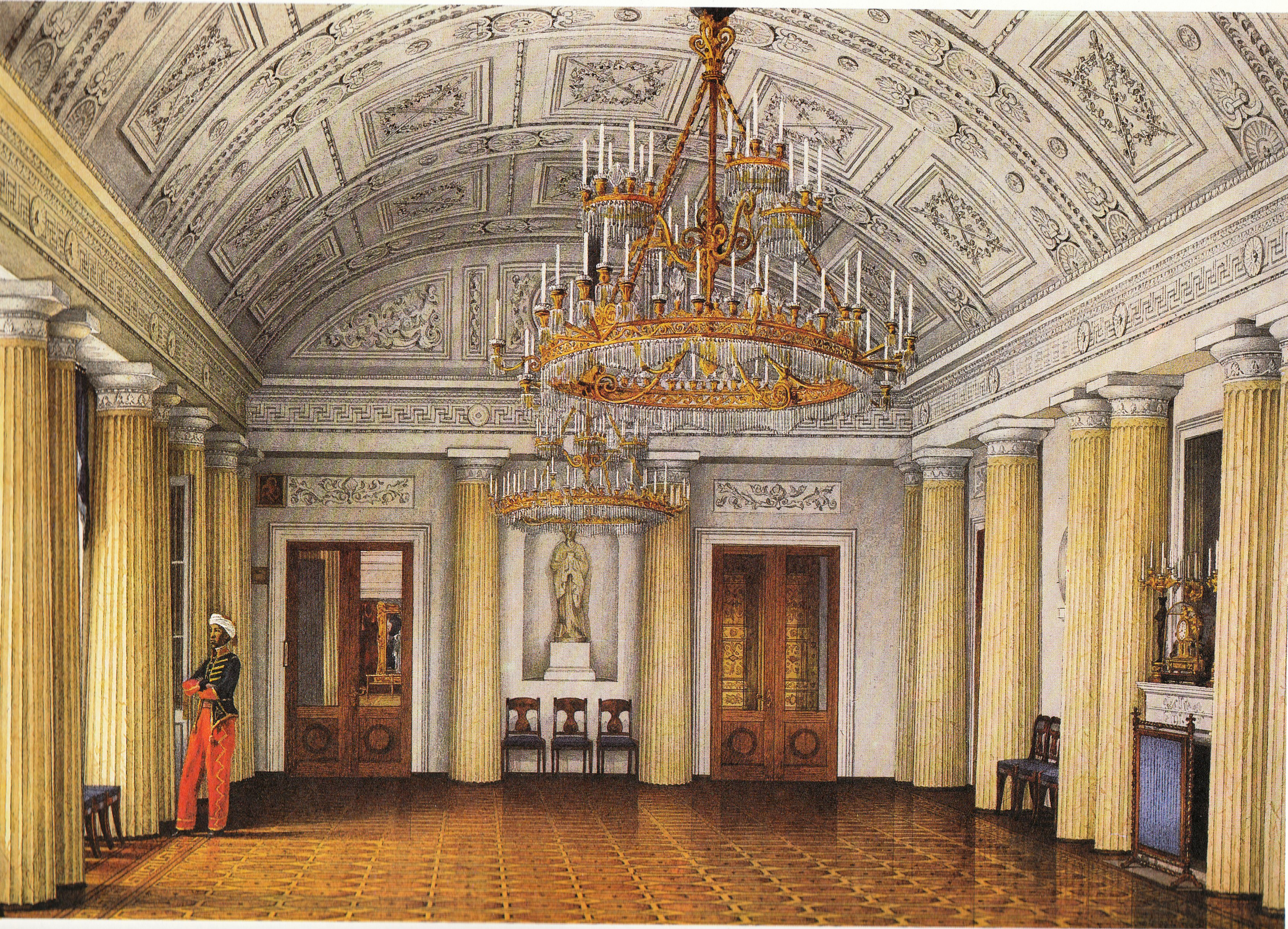
The Arabian Hall with one of the Tsar's four "Ethiopians", by Konstantin Ukhtomsky (1860s)

Location of the Arabian Room within the Winter Palace

The Arabian Hall, sometimes known as the Blackamoor Hall or the Arabian Dining Room, is one of the private rooms of the Winter Palace in Saint Petersburg. In the Tsarist era, it was the room from which imperial processions through the state rooms began. The double doors were designed to be on a straight axis through the principal state rooms and ultimately the Jordan Staircase, forming an enfilade. Thus it was here the Romanov family often assembled, in private, before state receptions and occasions. The privacy of the room was not compromised by the small private courtyard (see plan) from which windows, which once led to the Tsaritsa's winter-garden below, admitted light.

Designed by Alexander Briullov following the Winter Palace fire of 1837, the room is decorated in the neoclassical style fashionable in the early 19th century, known as Pompeian. A ceiling, with a low segmental barrel vault with bands of shallow coffering stuccoed with classical motifs, is seemingly supported by a colonnade of engaged fluted Greek Doric columns with enriched echinus molding and no bases. A Greek key fret enriches the entablature that runs without a break round the room. The only furnishings were the dining chairs of Greek klismos type, formally ranged round the walls. When the Imperial family were to dine here, dining tables would be brought in, covered and laid, then removed afterwards.

The various geographically confused names of the Arabian Hall derive, not from any peculiar contents, but from the four official pseudo-bodyguards of the Tsar who travelled from palace to palace with the Imperial family. They were four "massive Negroes" fantastically dressed in scarlet trousers, gold jackets, white turbans and curved shoes. Wherever the Tsar was, they guarded the doors between the private and official world. They had no other function other than to open and close doors; their sudden, but silent appearance into a room was the signal that heralded the immediate appearance of the Tsar or Tsaritsa.

Although the guards were referred to as the Ethiopians or Blackamoors, from 1896, at least one was an American. Jim Hercules holidayed in the US and always returned with jars of guava jelly for the Imperial children.

Today, the empty hall is occasionally used for special exhibitions held by the State Hermitage Museum.
