= White Hall of the Winter Palace =

Hall designed by Alexander Briullov

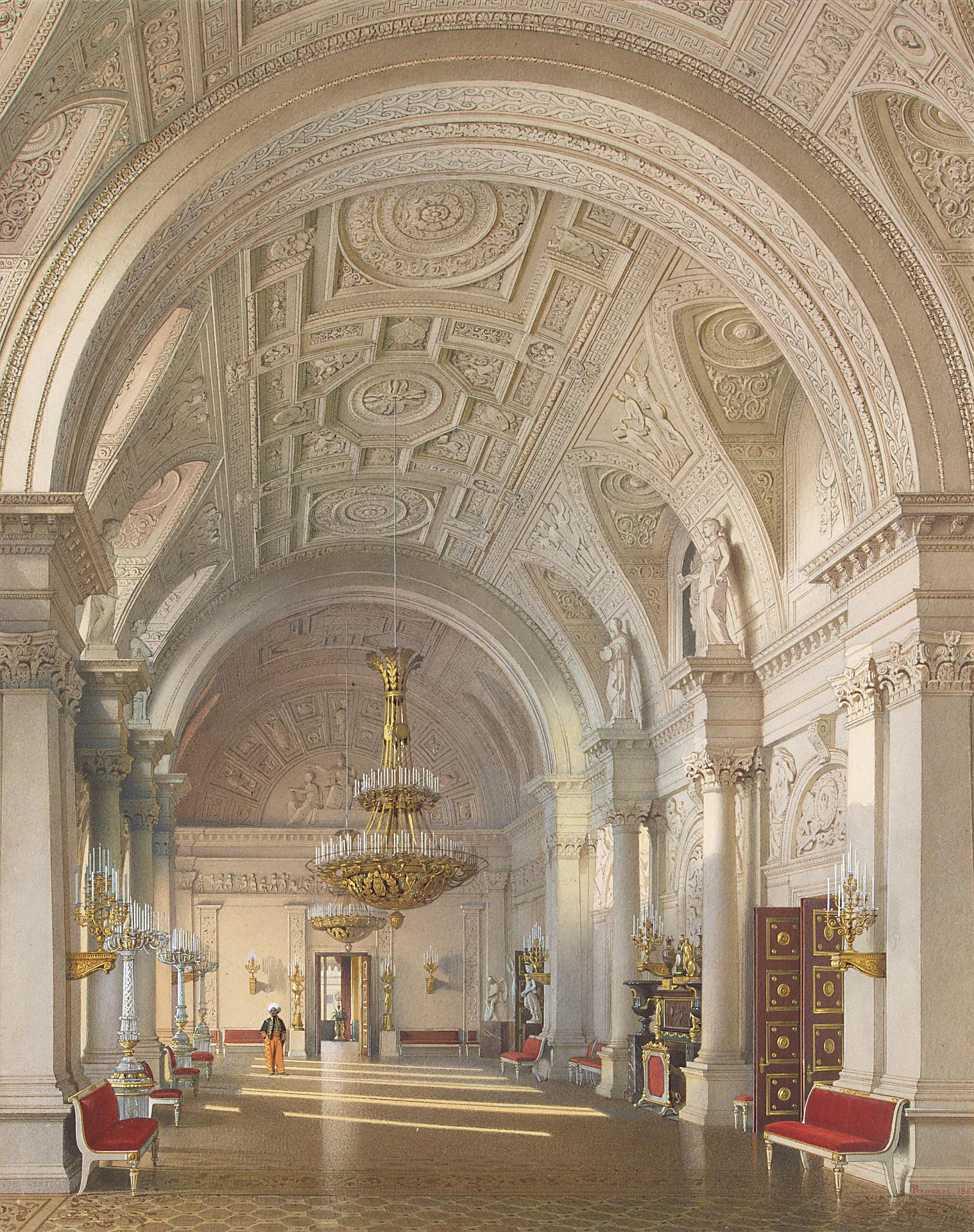
The White Hall in 1863, by Luigi Premazzi

The White Hall of the Winter Palace was designed by the architect Alexander Briullov to commemorate the marriage of the Tsarevich to Maria of Hesse in 1841. This period coincided with a large rebuilding of the Winter Palace following a severe fire in 1837. While the exterior of the palace was recreated in its original 18th-century style, much of the interior was rebuilt in a variety of styles, dependent on the whims and tastes of their intended occupants.

The hall and adjoining rooms formed the suite of the Tsarevich and Tsarevna, and remained their private rooms after their accession in 1855.

The hall is in a classical style, its vaulted ceiling supported by Corinthian columns crowned by statues representing the arts.

Today, as part of the State Hermitage Museum, this room retains its original decoration.

== Architectural features ==
The space of the hall is divided into three unequal parts by the pylons projecting from the walls, on which the underpinning arches rest. The pylons are trimmed with paired pilasters of the Corinthian order. The wall plane between the pylons is in turn divided into three parts in Corinthian order by columns topped with a sculpture. The walls of the extreme compartments are dissected by smaller pilasters decorated with a stucco decoration; above them runs a wide band of bas-relief. At the Emperor's notice in the end wall, it was decided not to decorate the apertures with porticoes with columns and a triangular pediment, as Brullov had intended.

The sculptural decoration of the hall includes a round sculpture of female figures above the columns, symbolising various types of art, and bas-relief figures depicting the gods of Olympus: Juno and Jupiter, Diana and Apollo, Ceres and Mercury, Vesta and Neptune. The frieze is filled with numerous putti figures. The sculptural decoration was created as an embodiment of the reign program of the future emperor. The effect of the monochrome hall is also based on the combination of the differently shaped surfaces of the polished marble and the whitewashed stucco decorations. The relief ornamentation, enclosed in geometric frames, also covers the lunettes and the vaults of the room.
