= Alexander Brullov =

Russian painter (1798–1877)

- Александр Брюллов
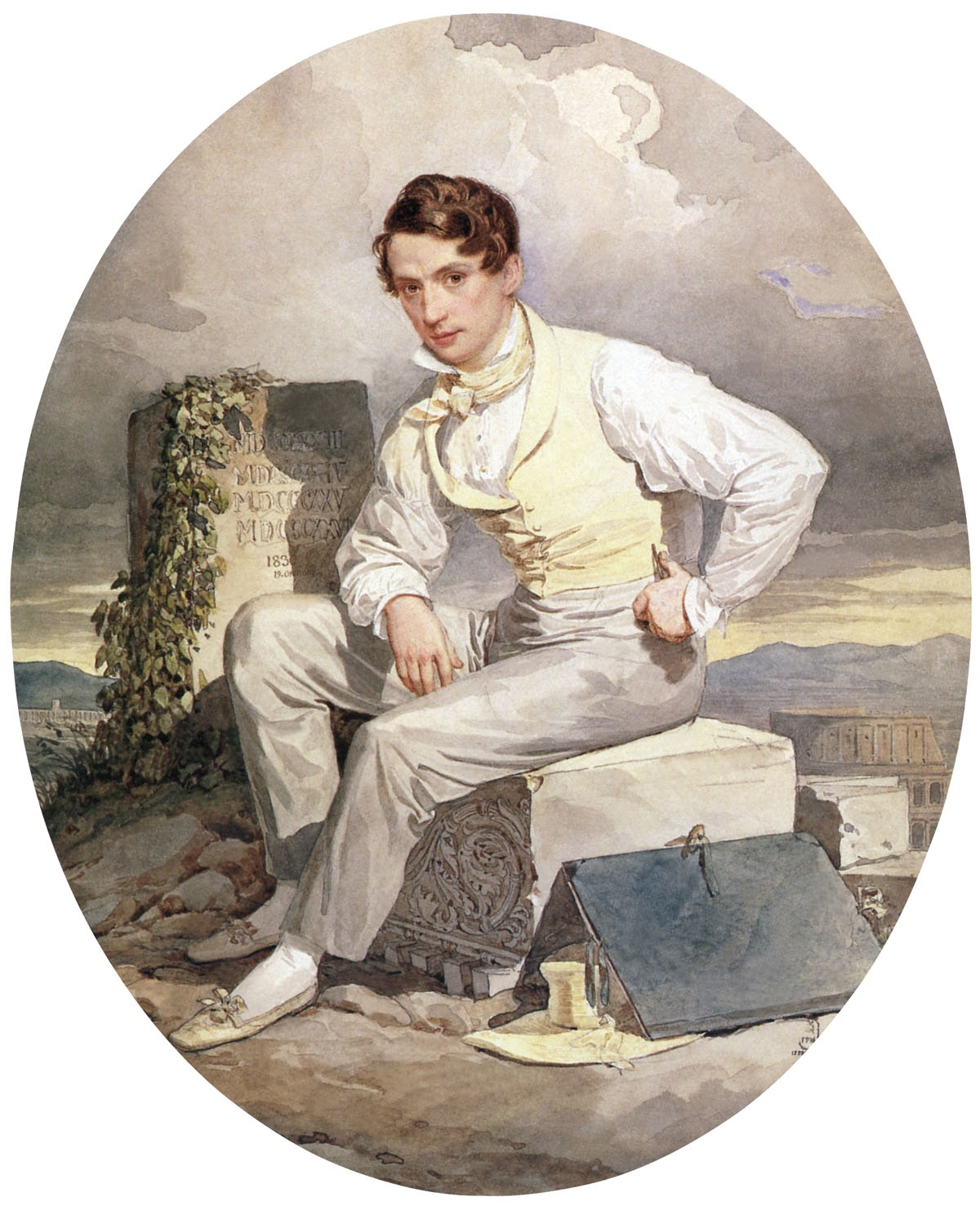
- Self-portrait, 1830
- Born: 29 November 1798; Saint Peterburg, Russian Empire
- Died: 9 January 1877 (aged 78); Saint Peterburg, Russian Empire
- Resting place: Pavlovsk Cemetery
- Education: Member Academy of Arts (1831)
- Known for: Painting, Architecture

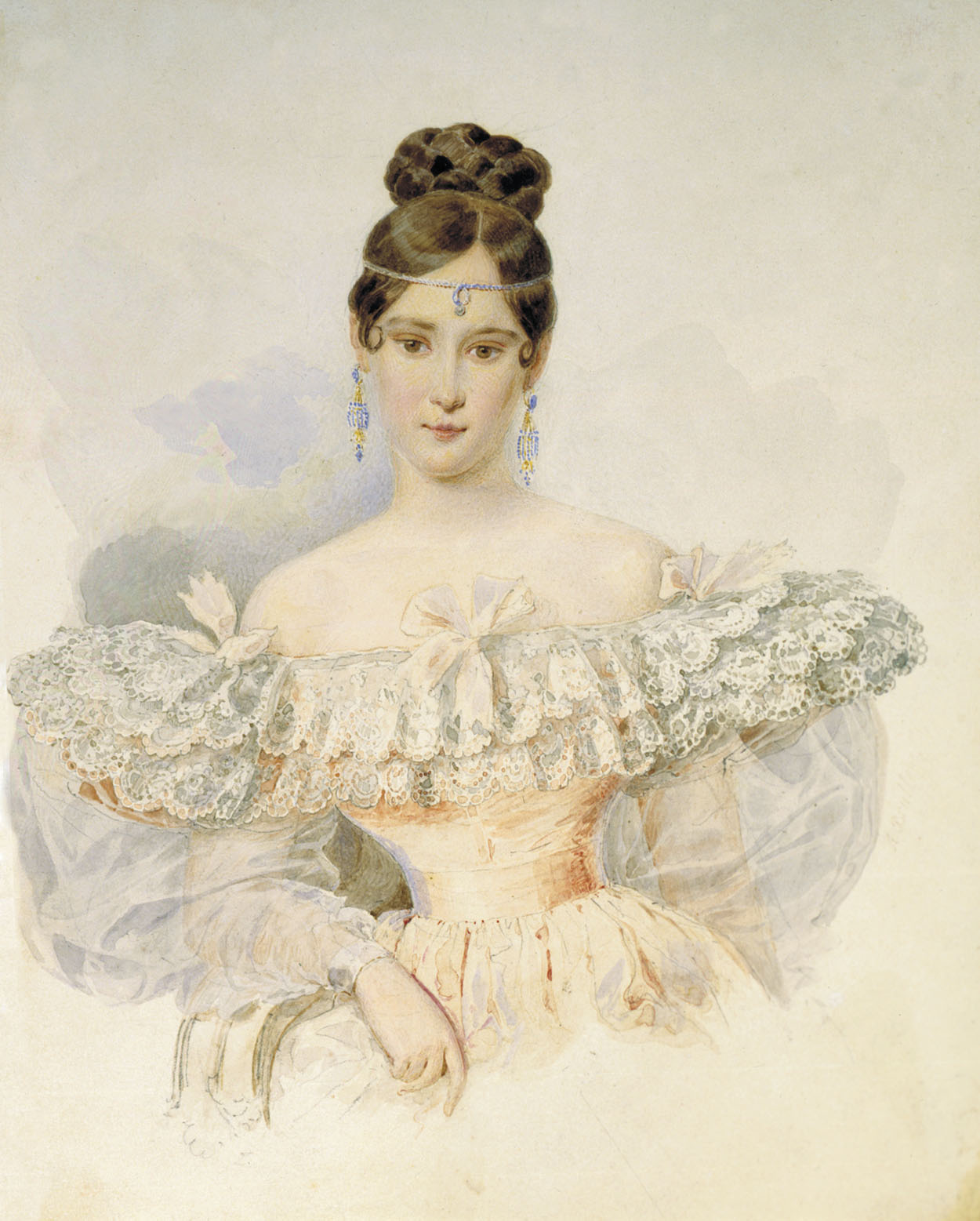
Portrait of Natalia Pushkina (c. 1831)

Alexander Pavlovich Brullov, sometimes Brulloff (né Brüllo until 1822; Russian: Александр Павлович Брюллов, romanized: Aleksandr Pavlovich Bryullov; 29 November 1798 – 9 January 1877), was a Russian artist associated with Russian Neoclassicism.

== Early life ==
Alexander Brullov was born in Saint Petersburg into a family of French artists: his great-grandfather, his grandfather, his father and his brothers (including Karl Brullov) were artists. His first teacher was his father Paul. He attended the Imperial Academy of Arts architecture class from 1810 to 1820, and graduated with honors. Along with his brother, Karl, he was sent to Europe to study art and architecture with a stipend from the Society for the Promotion of Artists.

== Career ==
Alexander Brullov spent eight years abroad, from 1822 to 1830, in Italy, Germany and France, studying architecture and art. He painted many watercolor portraits at that time. Among the best were those of Yekaterina Pavlovna Bakunina, John Capodistria, Natalya Goncharova-Pushkina, wife of the Russian poet Alexander Pushkin and Yekaterina Ivanovna Zagryazhskaya, her aunt. He also did illustrations for books and magazines.

In 1831, after his return to Russia, he was appointed professor at the Imperial Academy of Arts and these were the years when he created his best architectural projects. Among others, he designed and supervised the construction of the following buildings in Saint Petersburg:

- Mikhailovsky Theatre (now Maliy Theater, 1831–1833)
- Lutheran Church of Saint Peter and Saint Paul on Nevsky Prospekt (1833–1838)
- Pulkovo Observatory (1834–1839)
- The Guard Corps Headquarters on Palace Square (1837–1843).

He was one of the principal architects for the reconstruction of the Winter Palace after the fire of 1837. He designed many striking interiors there, including the Pompei Hall, the Malachite Room, and the White Hall.

In 1844 he designed and built Orenburg Caravanserai in Orenburg.

His son Pavel also became a painter of some note.

== Brullov - portrait painter ==
Alexander Brullov was an outstanding watercolourist. He painted portraits of the Royal Family in Naples. He made a drawing of the Coliseum in Rome for Empress Maria Feodorovna.

In 1831–1832, he painted the famous watercolour portrait of Pushkin's wife Natalia Goncharova. It is one of her best portraits, and one of the best watercolours in the history of Russian art.

In 1837, Briullov painted his portrait of Walter Scott at an evening in Paris at the house of Princess Golitsina and had the drawing transferred onto the lithographic stone. In 1830 in St Petersburg Brullov painted a watercolour portrait of Prince Lopukhin, a year later he painted a watercolour portrait of Tsarevich Alexander surrounded by cadets from the Guards corps.

== Buildings designed by Brullov ==
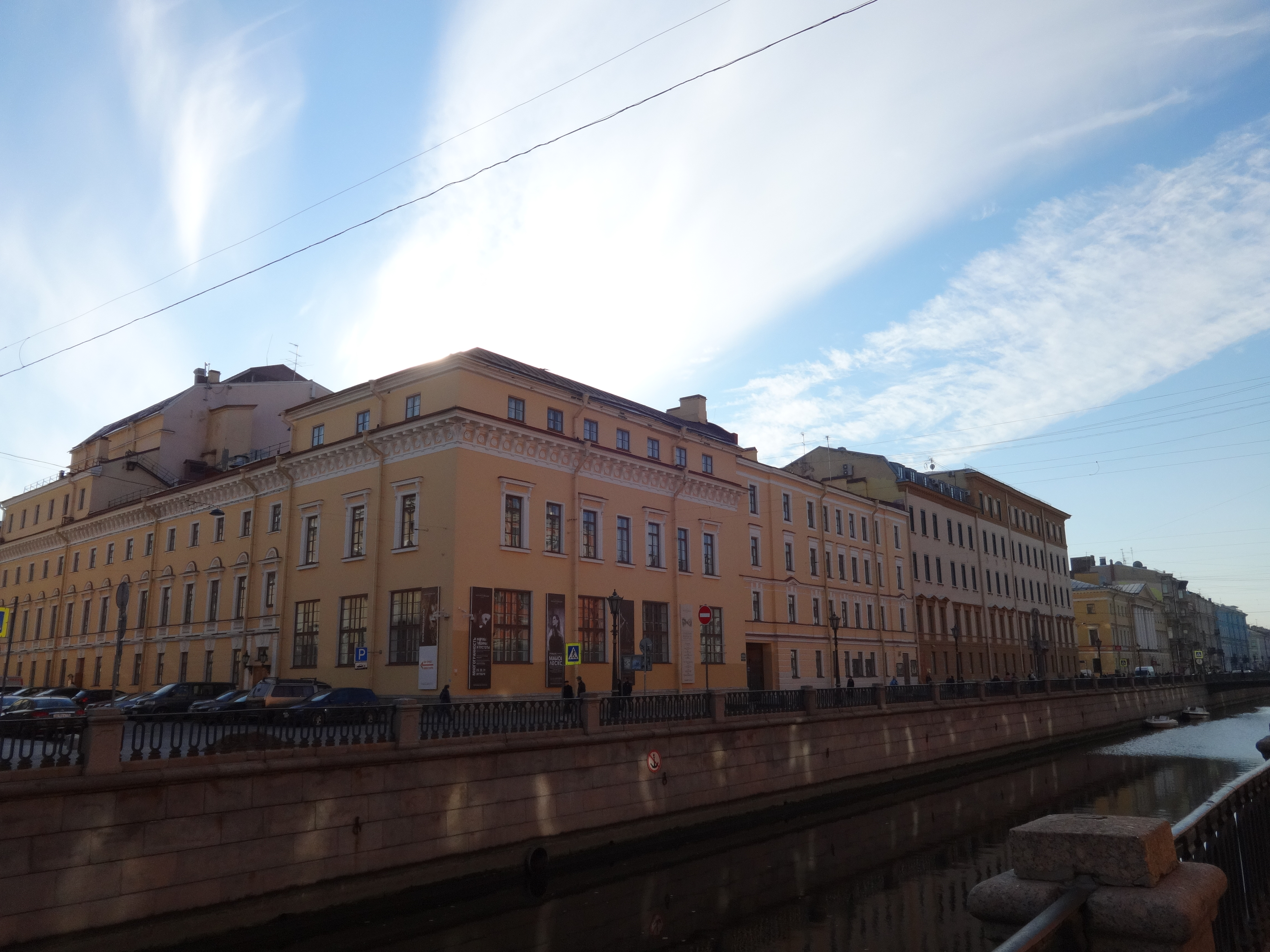
Mikhailovsky Theatre

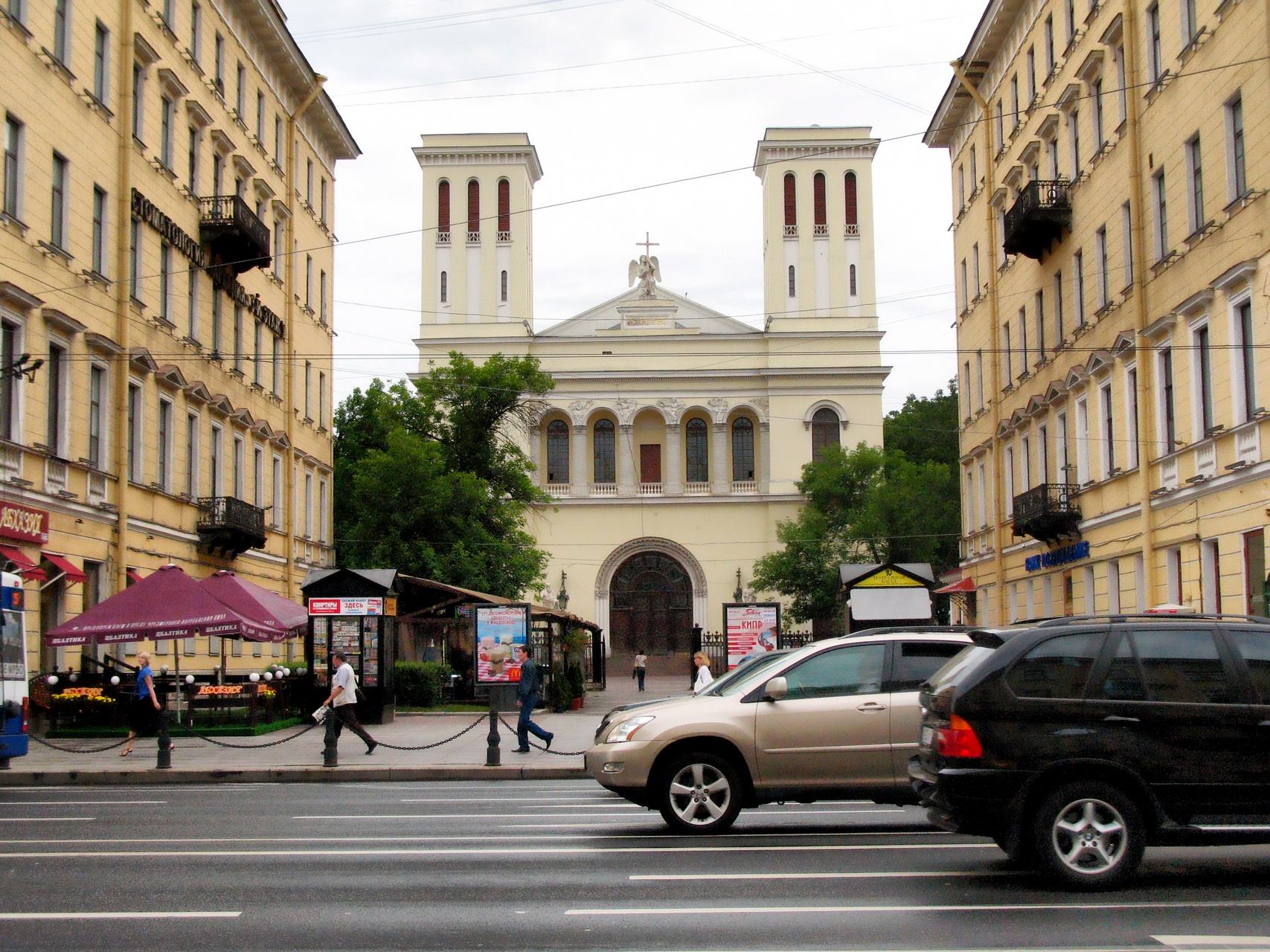
Lutheran Church of Saint Peter and Saint Paul

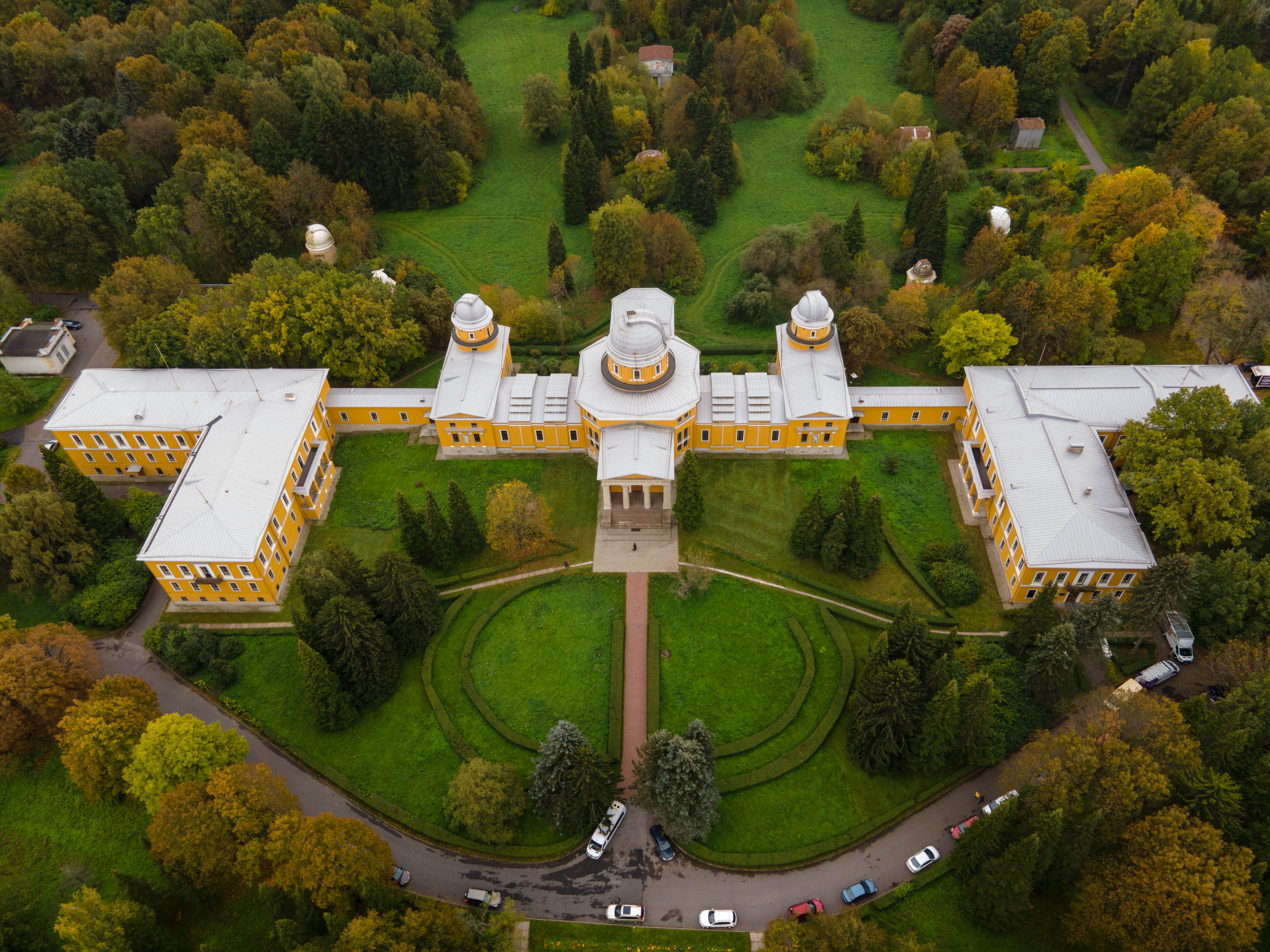
Pulkovo Observatory

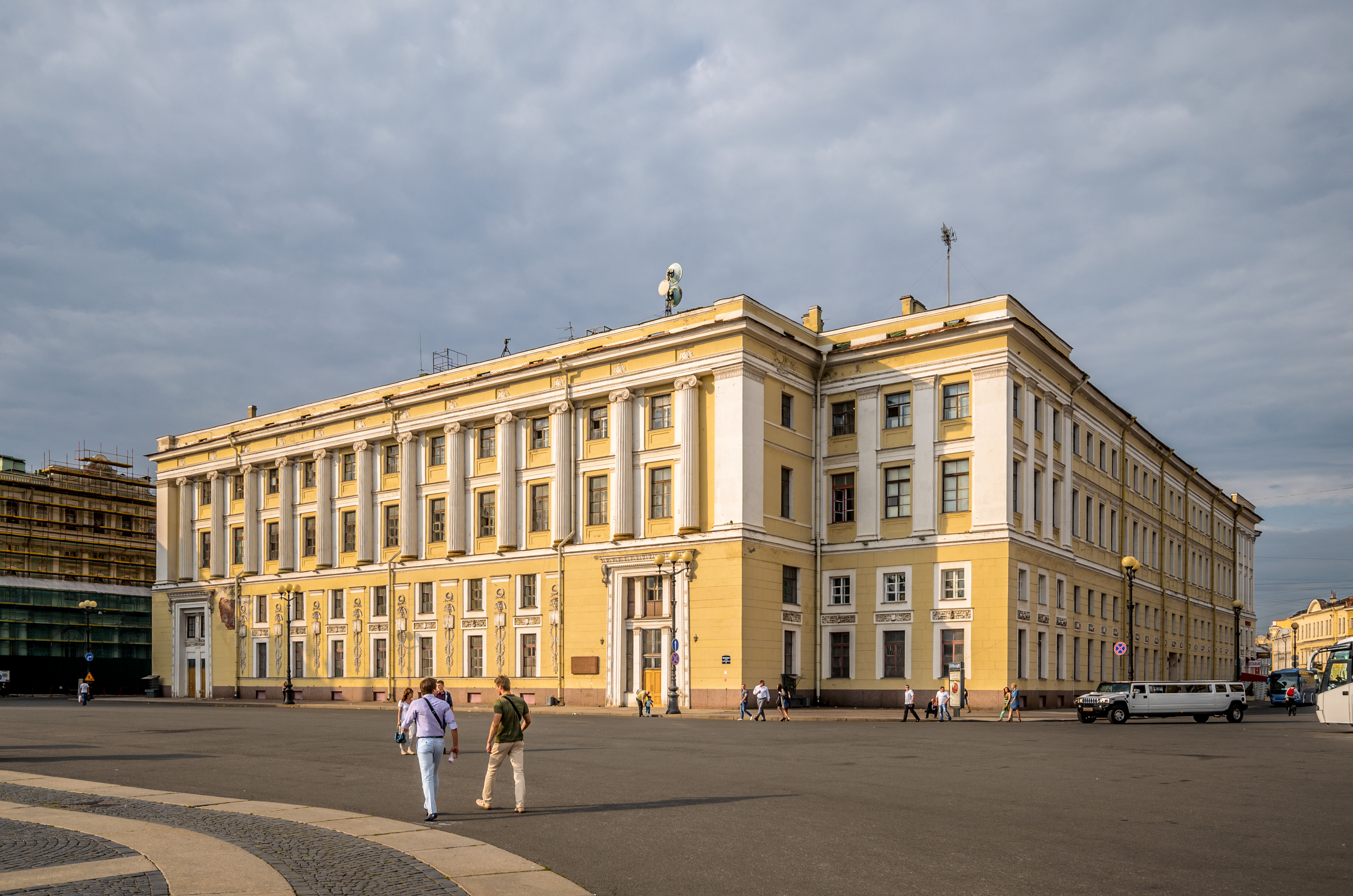
East side of Palace Square

== Writings ==
- Thermes de Pompéi. A. Firman Didot, Paris, 1829.
