= Sarafan (disambiguation) =

Sarafan may refer to one of the following:

- Sarafan, a Russian traditional women's clothing
- List of Legacy of Kain characters
- Sarafan (horse), a racehorse
