= Kokoshnik =

Traditional Russian headdress worn by women

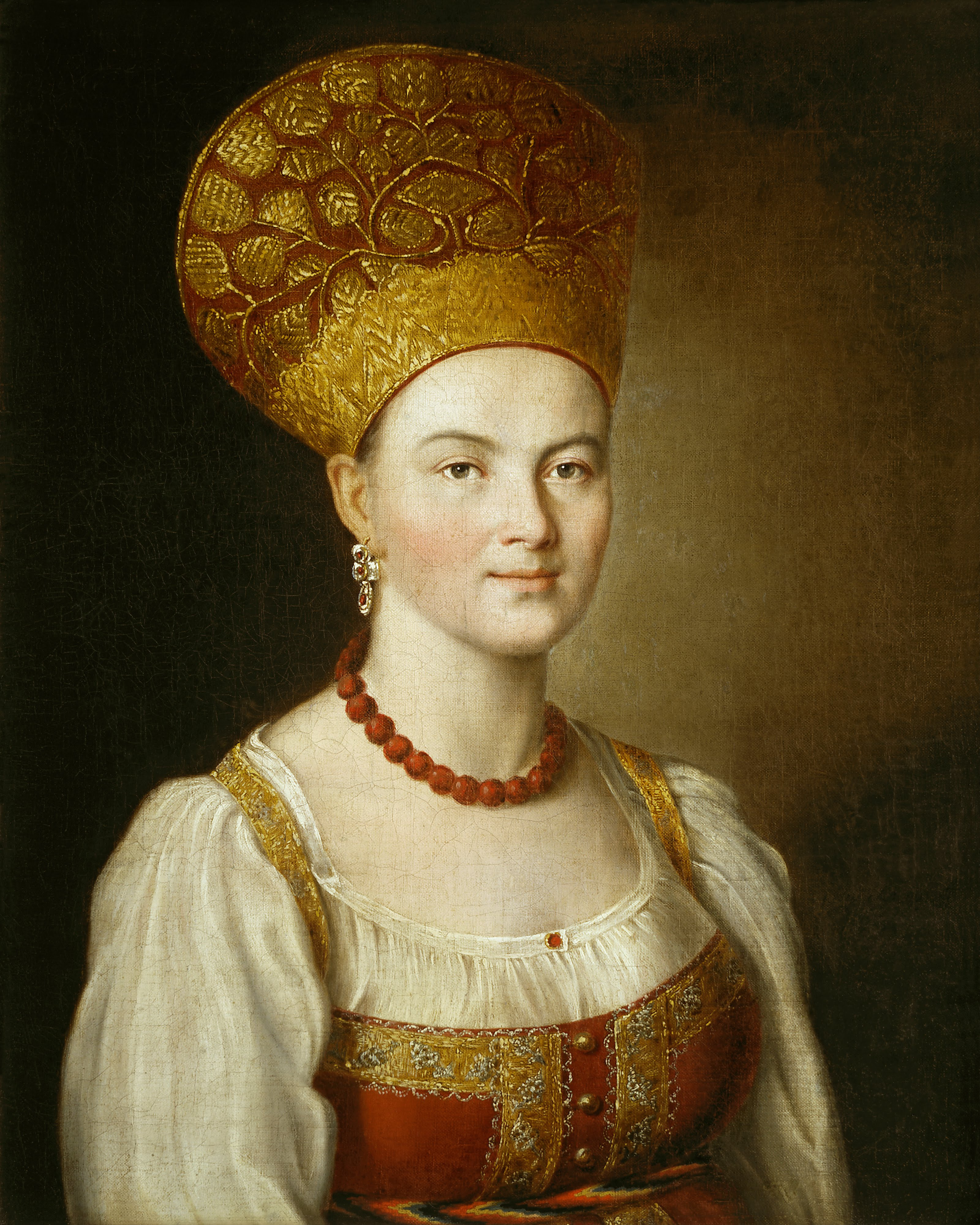
The portrait of an unknown girl in the traditional Russian clothing by Ivan Argunov, 1784, showcasing a large kokoshnik head dress.

The kokoshnik (Russian: коко́шник, IPA: [kɐˈkoʂnʲɪk]) is a traditional Russian headdress worn by women and girls to accompany the sarafan. The kokoshnik tradition has existed since the 10th century in the city of Veliky Novgorod. It spread primarily in the northern regions of Russia and was very popular from 16th to 19th centuries. It is still to this day an important feature of Russian dance ensembles and folk culture and inspired the Kokoshnik style of architecture.

== Overview ==
Historically a kokoshnik is a headdress worn by married women, though maidens also wore a headdress very similar to a kokoshnik, but open in the back, named a povyazka. The word kokoshnik describes a great variety of headdresses worn throughout Russia, including the cylindrical hats of Veliky Novgorod, two-pointed nimbus kika of Vladimir, triangular kika of Kostroma, small pearl hats of Kargopol, and scarlet kokoshniks of Moscow.

While in the past kokoshnik styles varied greatly, currently a kokoshnik is generally associated with a tall, nimbus or crest shaped headdress which is tied at the back of the head with long thick ribbons in a large bow. The crest can be embroidered with pearls and goldwork or simple applique, usually using plant and flower motifs. The forehead area is frequently decorated with pearl netting. While wearing a kokoshnik the woman usually wears her hair in a plait. The kokoshnik were often also combined with the Russian braid.

== History ==
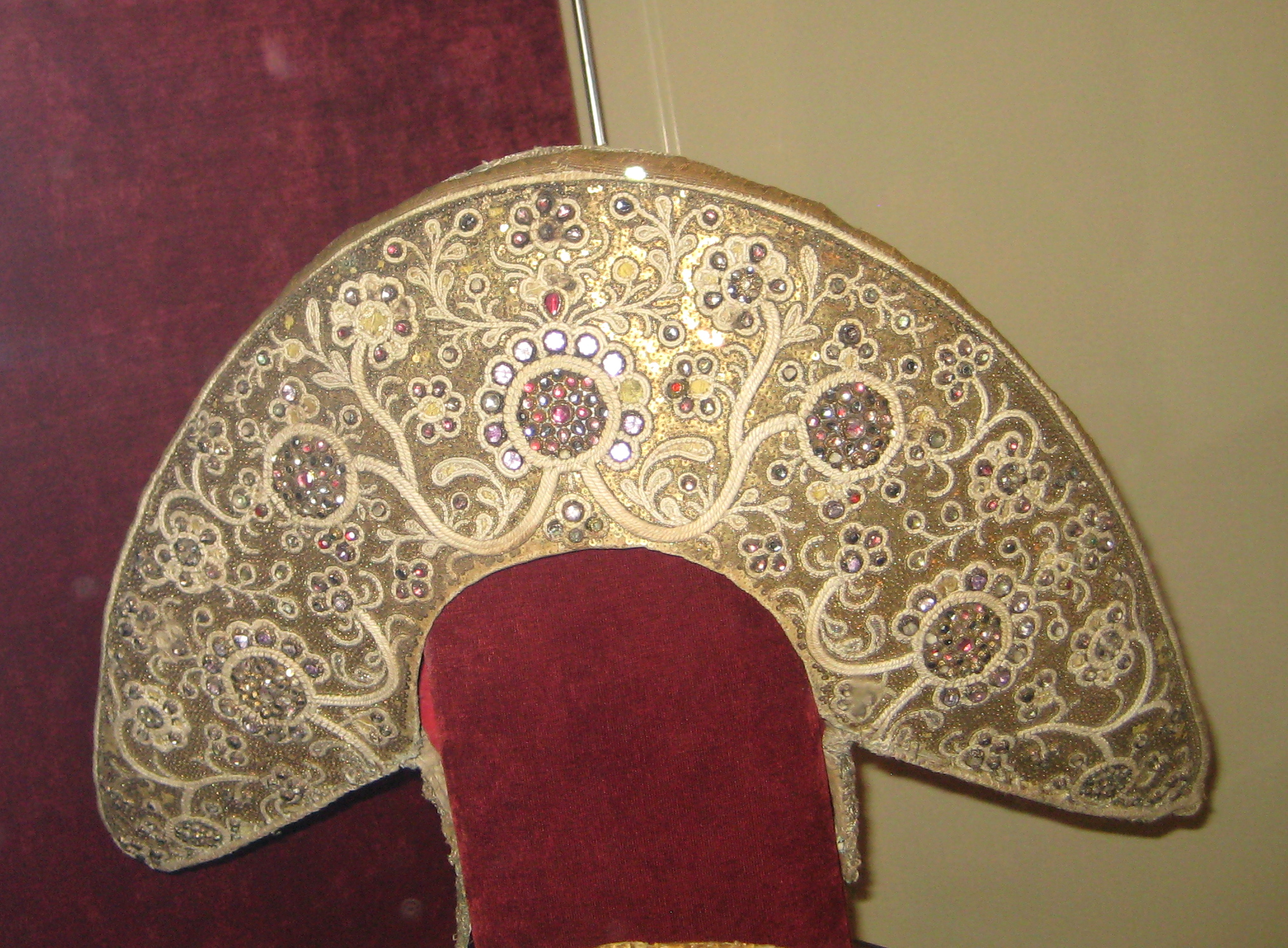
Mid 19th-century kokoshnik from Middle Russia

The word kokoshnik first appears in 16th-century documents, and comes from the Old Slavic kokosh, which means "hen" or "cockerel". However, the earliest head-dress pieces of similar type (rigid cylindrical hat which completely covered the hair) were found in the 10th- to 12th-century burials in Veliky Novgorod.

The kokoshnik gave its name to the decorative corbel arch that became a distinctive element of traditional Russian architecture from the 16th century onwards (see kokoshnik architecture).

During the revival of Russian national culture in the early 19th century, diadem-shaped tiaras became part of the official court dress for royalty and for ladies-in-waiting. These "kokoshniks" were inspired just as much by Italian Renaissance fashions and by the french hood as by the authentic Russian kokoshniks still worn by the middle class and wealthy peasants of the time. In this period both unmarried and married women wore the variety used traditionally by unmarried women: showing the front part of the hair, and with a translucent veil falling down the back.

After the 1917 Revolution, Russian émigrés popularized the kokoshnik within European fashion. The style had previously appeared in the 1893 wedding headdress of Mary of Teck, the future Queen consort of the United Kingdom.

Queen Marie of Romania wore a Cartier tiara created to resemble the Russian kokoshnik for her 1924 portrait painted by Philip de László. The tiara was among the jewels on display in the "Cartier: Style and History" exhibition at the Grand Palais in Paris from December 4 through February 16, 2014.

One of the costumes of Senator Padmé Amidala in the Star Wars saga, the Gold Travel Costume, was based on the Russian national costume with kokoshnik, known in the rest of Europe from the photographs taken during the 1903 Ball in the Winter Palace.

Some fans of Russia at the 2018 FIFA World Cup wore simple versions of kokoshniki. In recent years kokoshniki made out of flowers have become popular. Kokoshniki are a popular Russian souvenir.

== Gallery ==
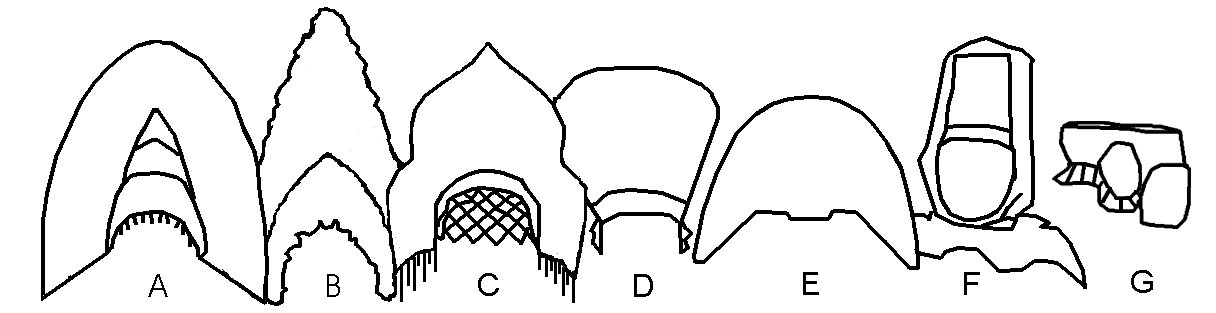
Seven different types of kokoshnik

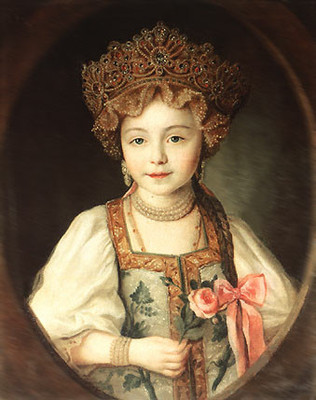
A young Grand Duchess Alexandra Pavlovna in kokoshnik and sarafan, 1790s.

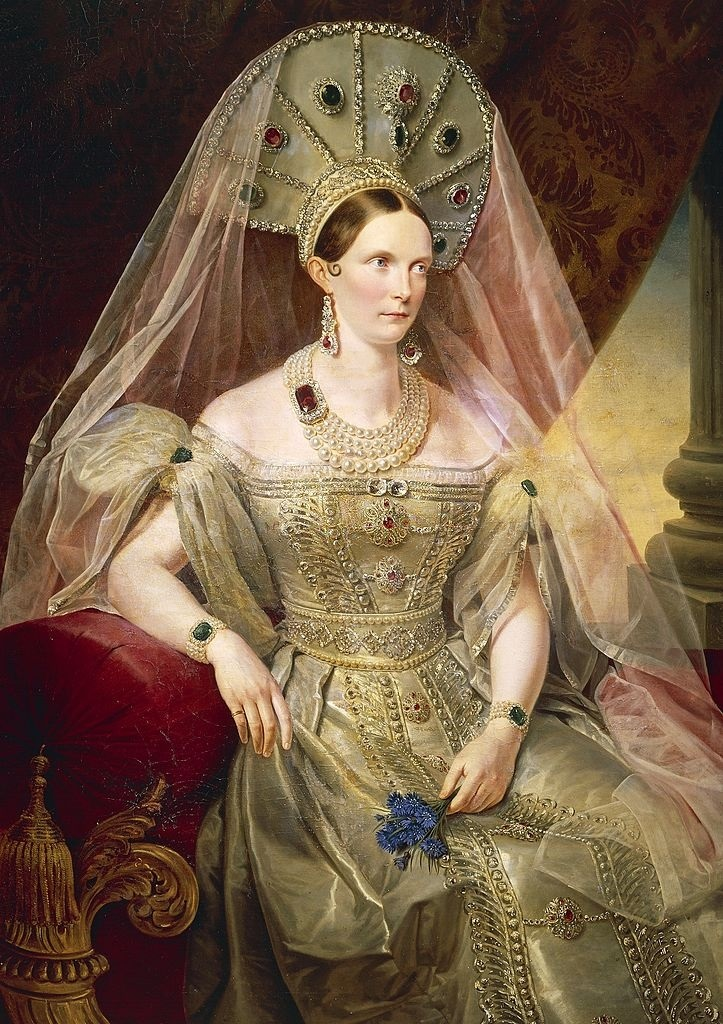
Empress Alexandra Feodorovna (Charlotte of Prussia) in kokoshnik, 19th century.

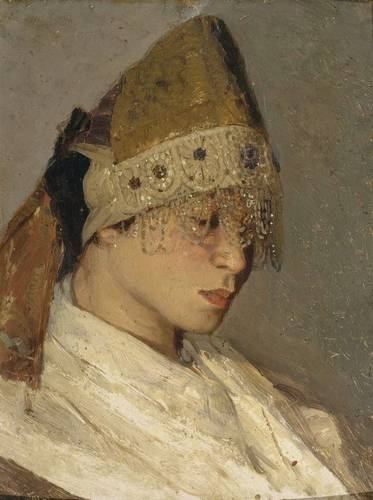
A girl in kokoshnik by Mikhail Nesterov, 1885.

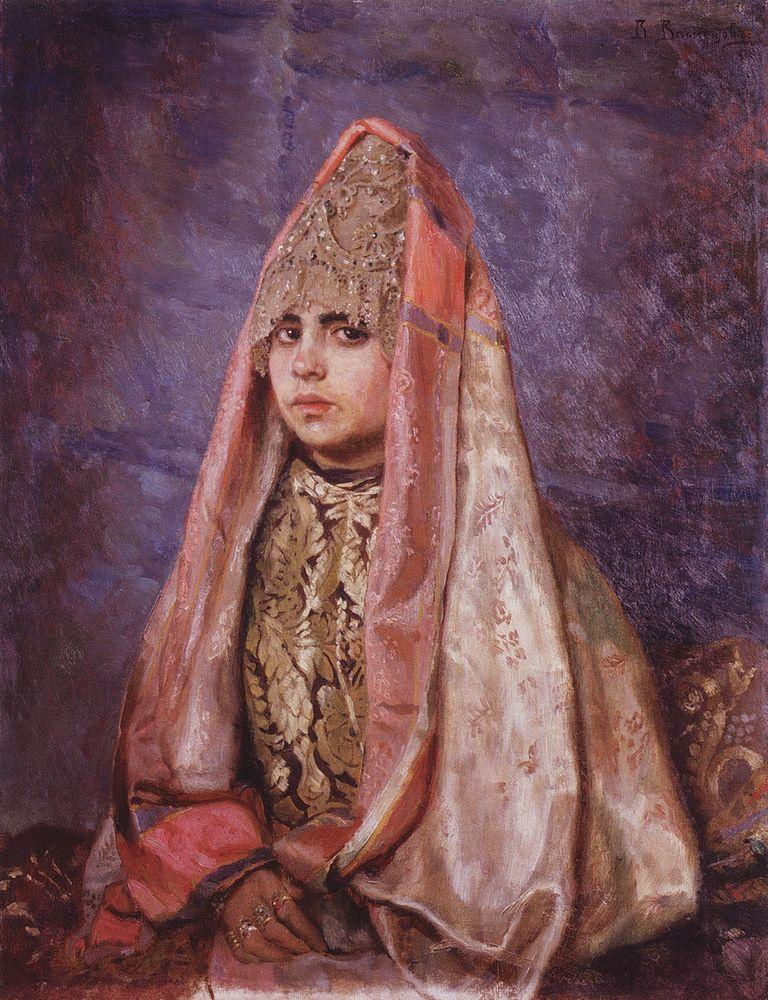
Boyaryshnya by Viktor Vasnetsov (the portrait of V. S. Mamontova), 1884.

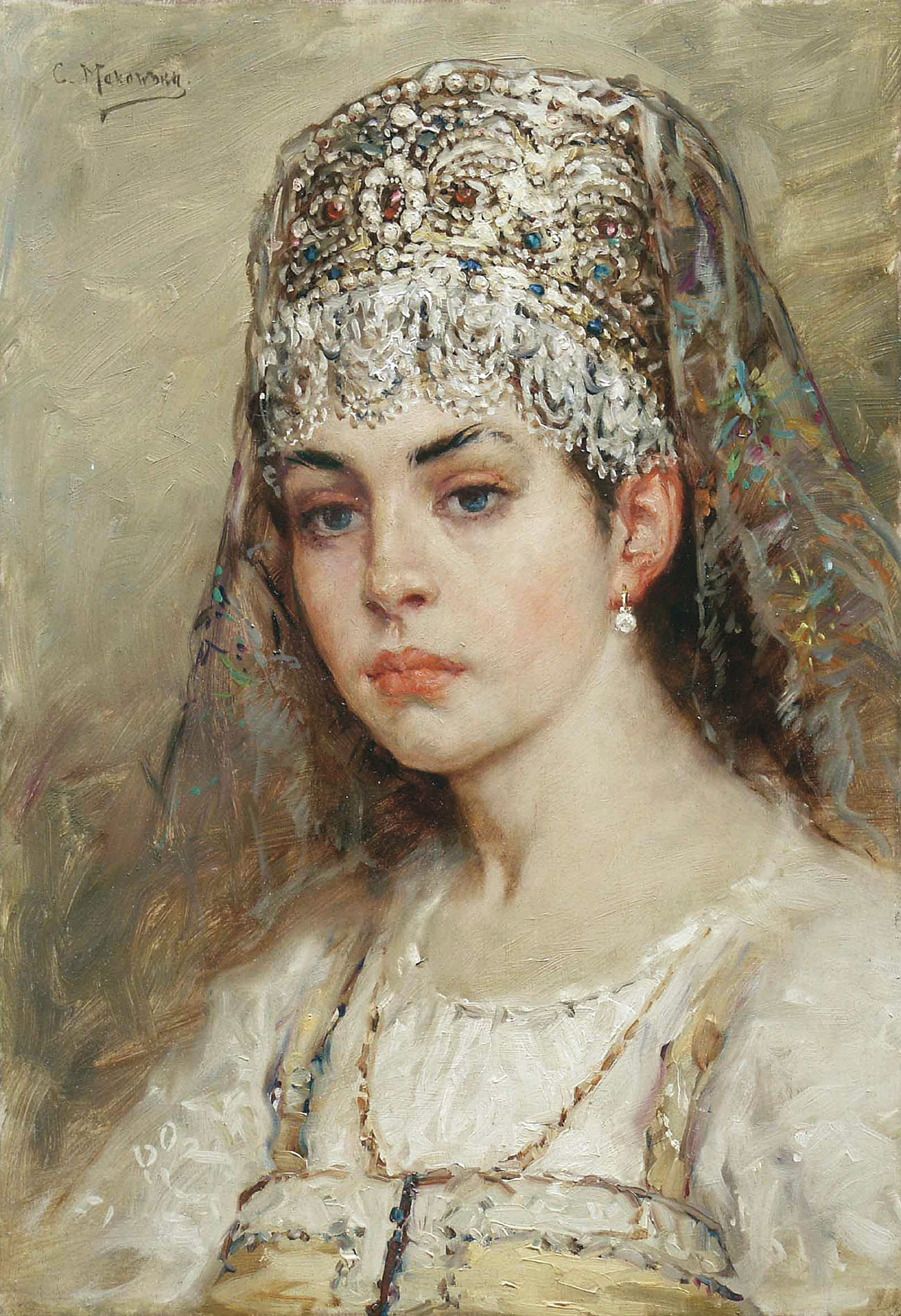
Boyaryshnya with kokoshnik covered with veil. 19th-century painting by Konstantin Makovsky.

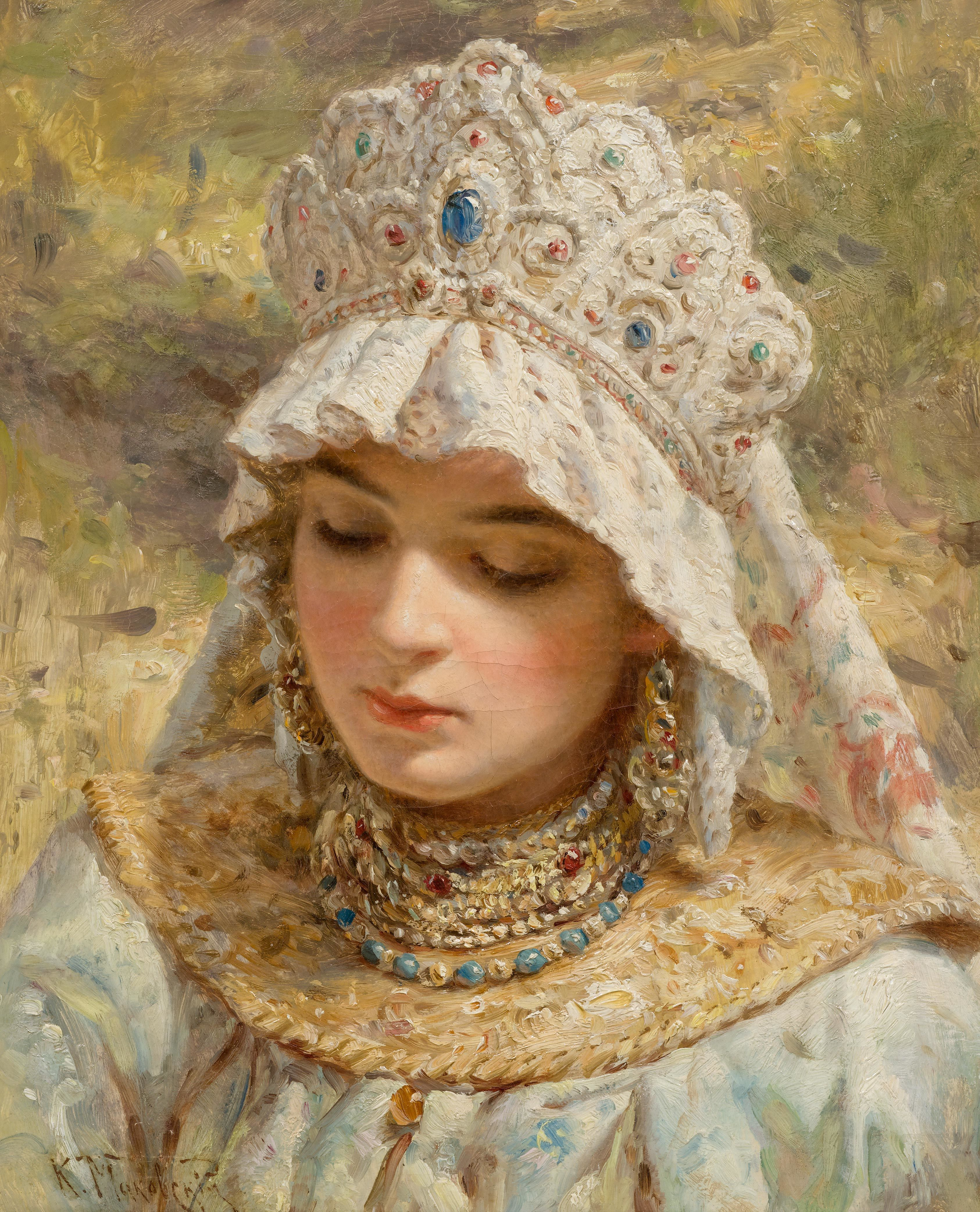
Russian girl with kokoshnik, before 1915, by Konstantin Makovsky

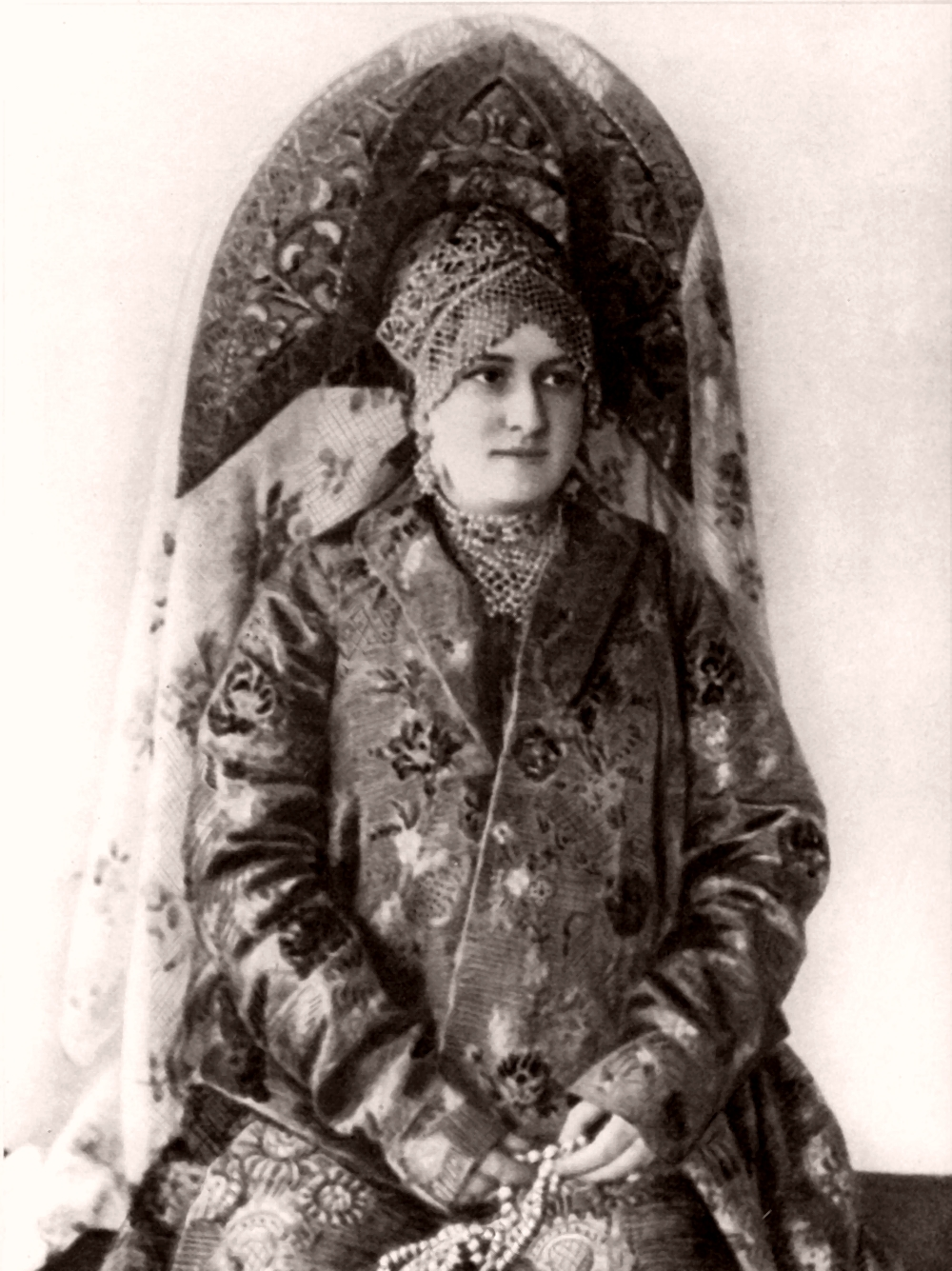
A woman wearing a large, rich, two-horned kokoshnik. 20th century. Photograph.

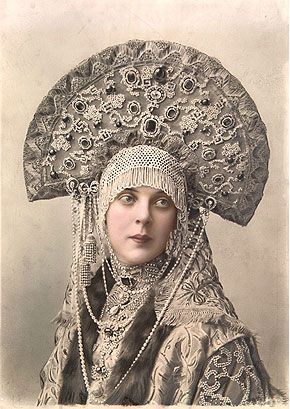
Princess Olga K. Orlova in Masquerade Costume for the Ball of 1903. Photograph by Elena Mrozovskaya.

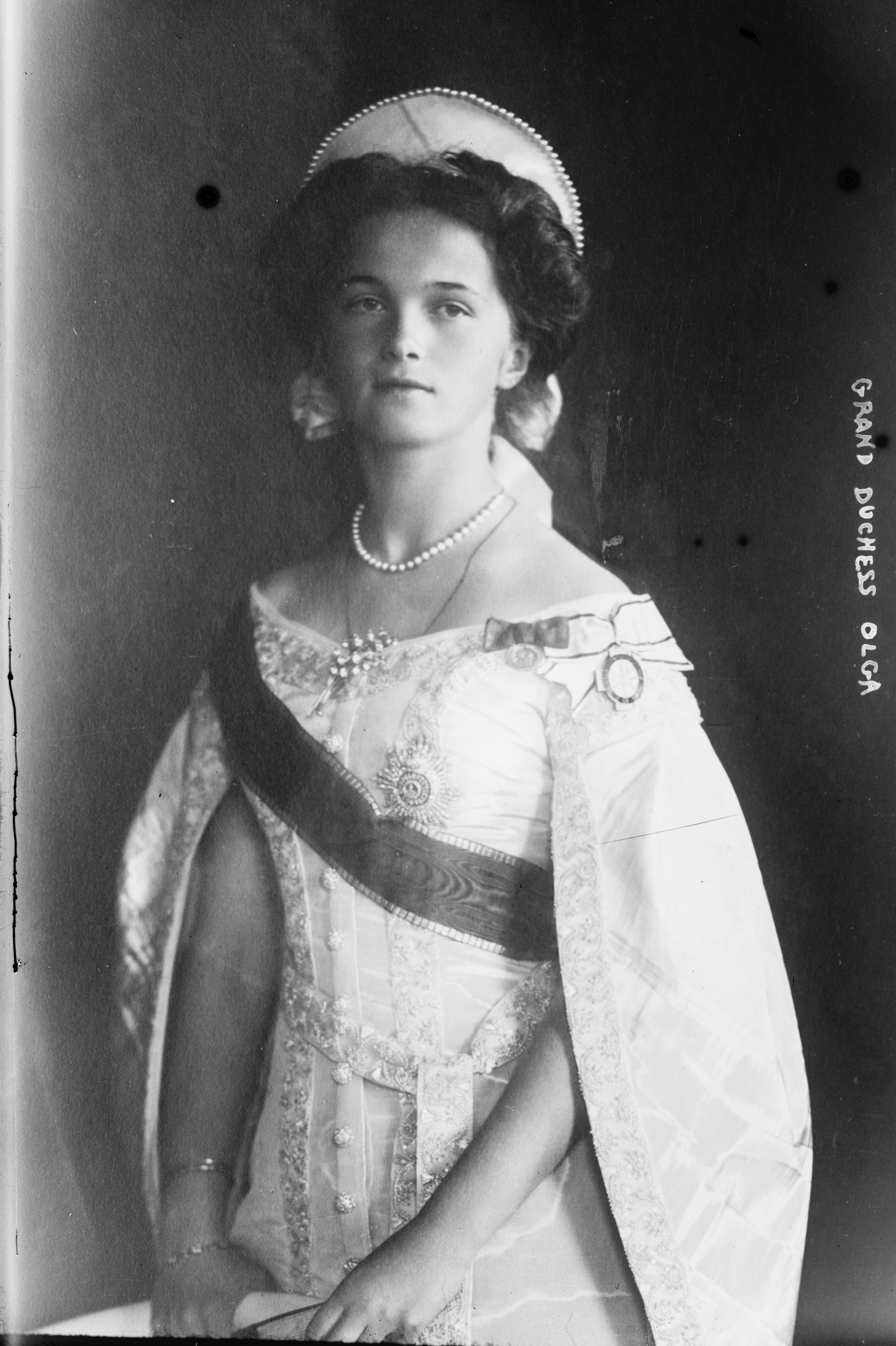
Grand Duchess Olga Nikolaevna of Russia in Russian court dress in 1910

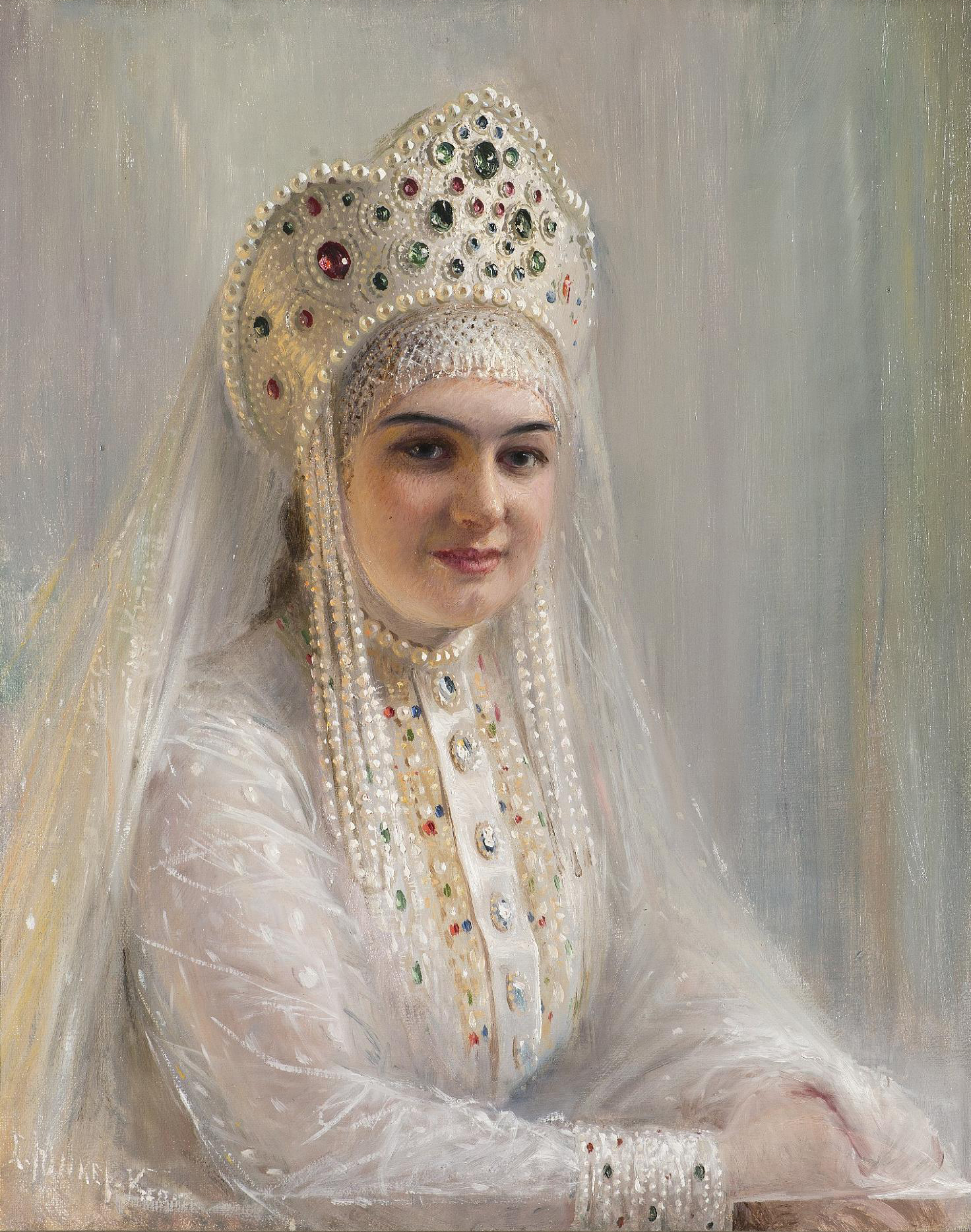
Girl in the Kokoshnik by Sophia Ivanovna Kramskaya

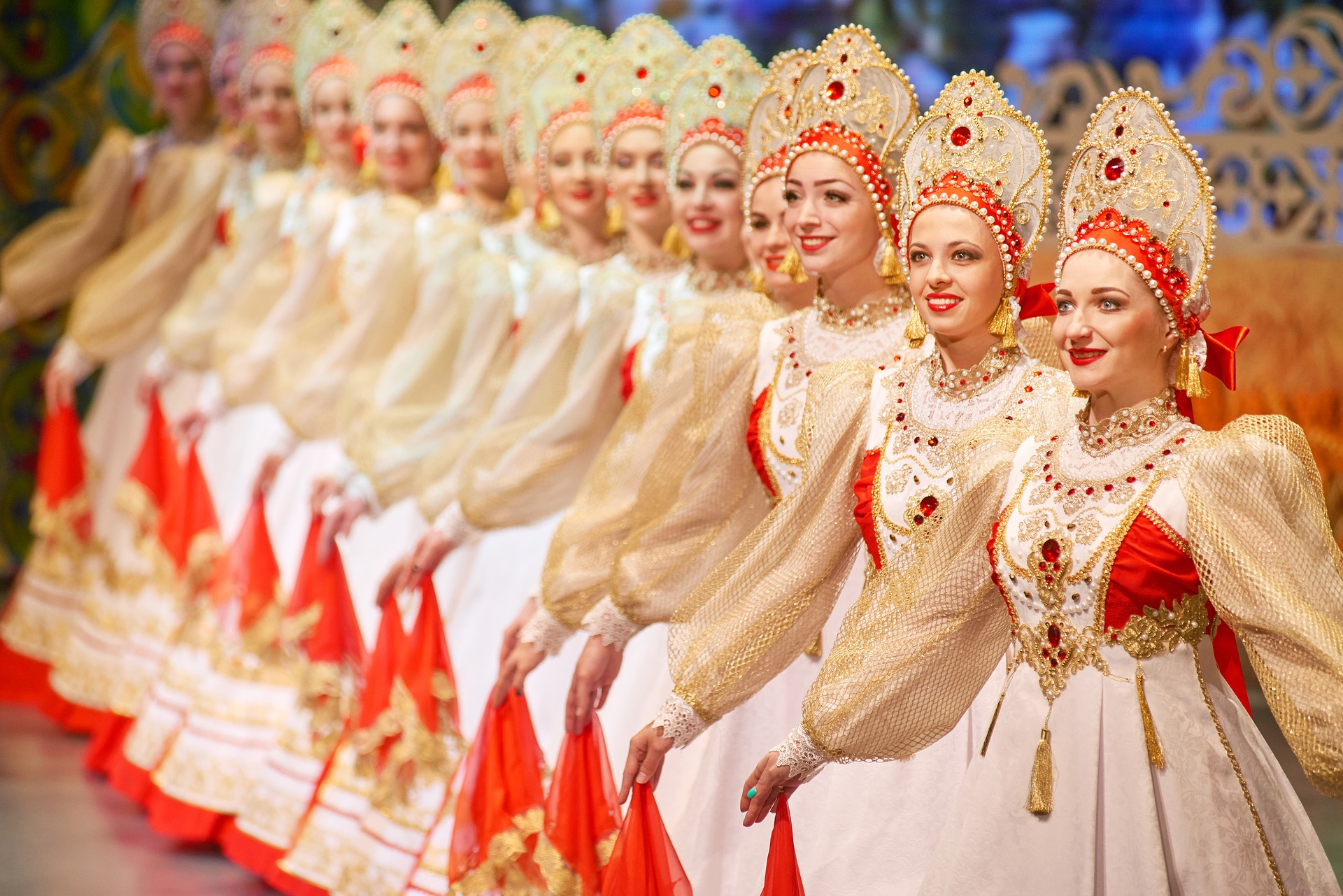
Women of Russian dance ensemble with kokoshniks in 2017

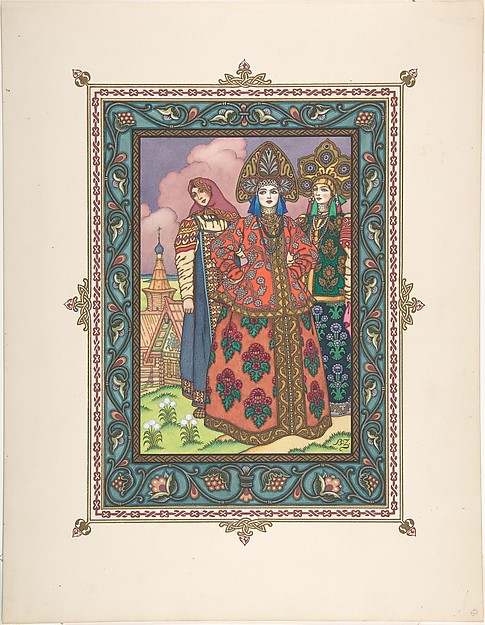
Illustration by Boris Zvorykin, in which appear three women, two of them wearing kokoshniks

== See also ==
- Sarafan
- Ryasna
- Ochipok

=== Similar headgear in other cultures ===
- Fontange
- Fengguan, Chinese
- French hood
  - Barbette
  - Hennin
- Gable hood
- Liangbatou, Chinese
