= Russian braid =

Traditional Russian hairstyle

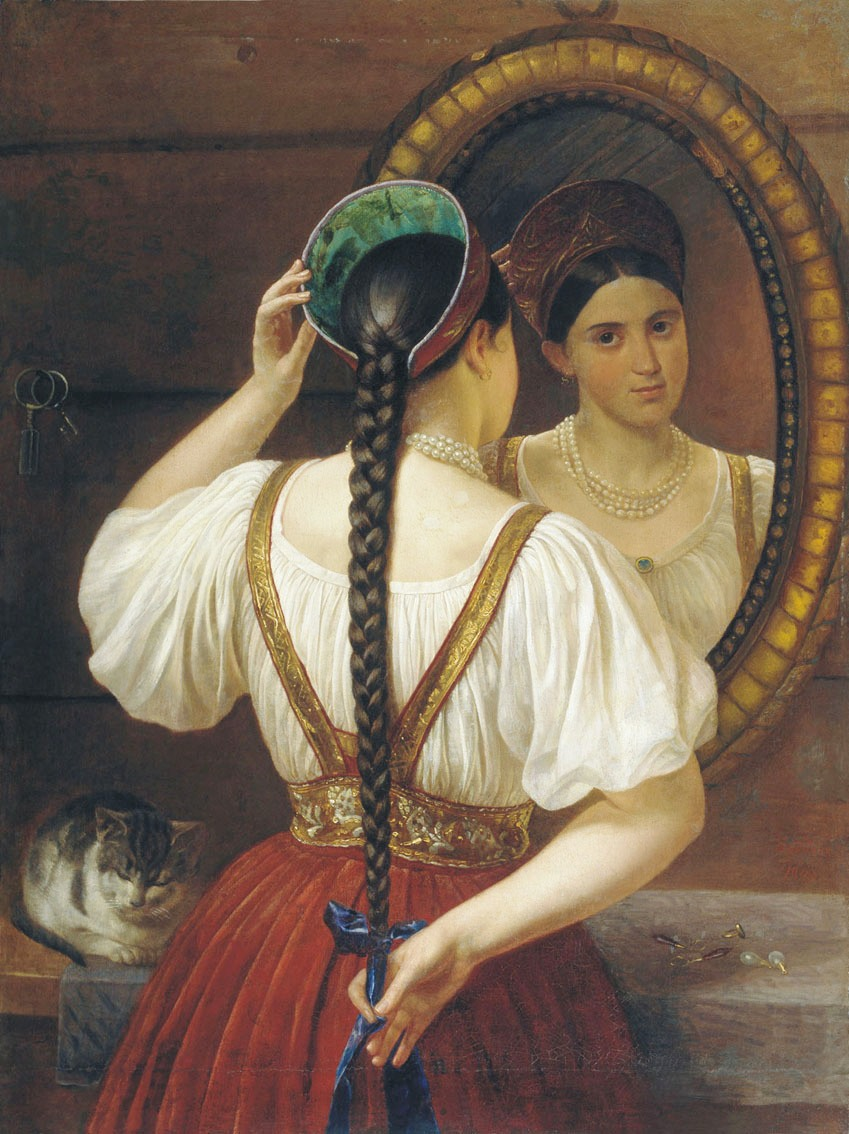
Painting by Budkin Philipp Osipovich, "Girl before a mirror", 1848, shows a Russian girl with a traditional Russian braid and the headress kokoshnik

The Russian braid (Russian: Русская коса, Russkaya kosa) is a national traditional hairstyle in Russia. It has an ancient history since the times of the Rus'. In modern Russia the hairstyle is still widespread among girls and women, while the symbolism behind the Russian braid is no longer so strong in modern Russia. It also plays an important role in Russian folk dance and Russian folk song ensembles.

== Significance ==
In Rus it was uncommon for women to cut their hair, so they would grow it for a long period of time and braid their long hair. The Russian braid symbolized honor and pride and had several meanings in Old Russia. One large and long braid was worn by girls in active search for a groom, while two braids which were tied around the head meant the girl was in marriage. If a colourful ribbon was woven into a braid, it meant that the girl is for marriage, when two ribbons appeared, it meant that the official groom was found. The end of a long braid was often adorned by a kosnik, a piece of jewelry that was made of birch bark.
