= Sergey Solomko =

Russian-French painter

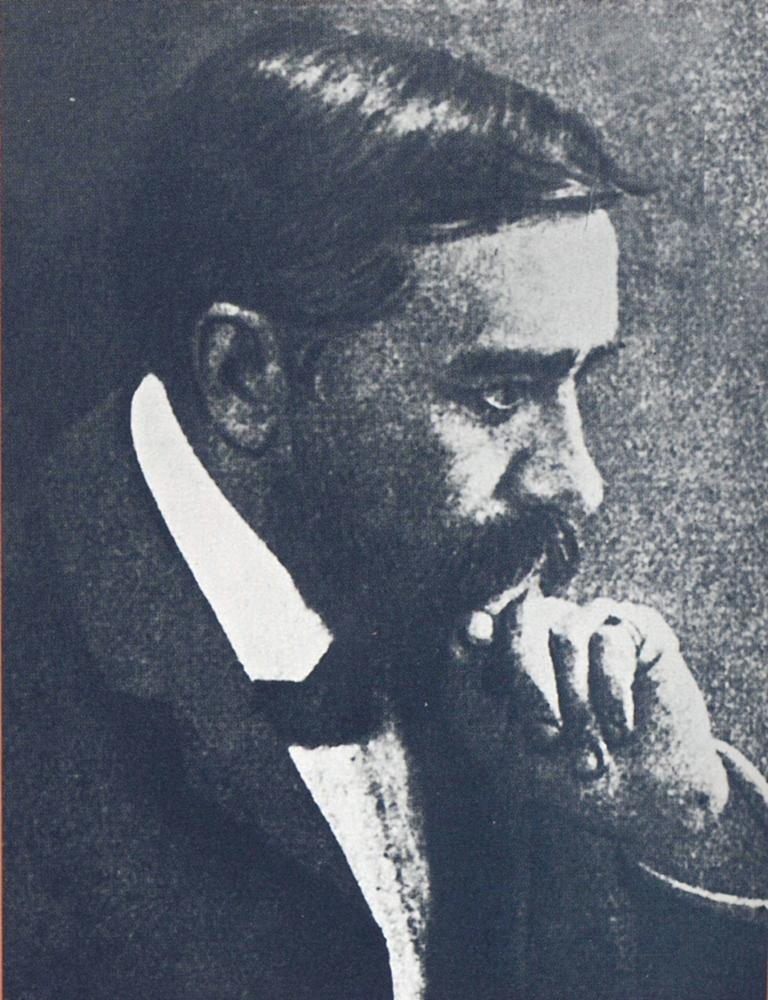
Sergey Solomko (c.1920)

Sergey Sergeyevich Solomko (Russian: Сергей Сергеевич Соломко; 22 August 1867 – 2 February 1928) was a Russian painter, watercolorist, illustrator and designer.

== Life and work ==
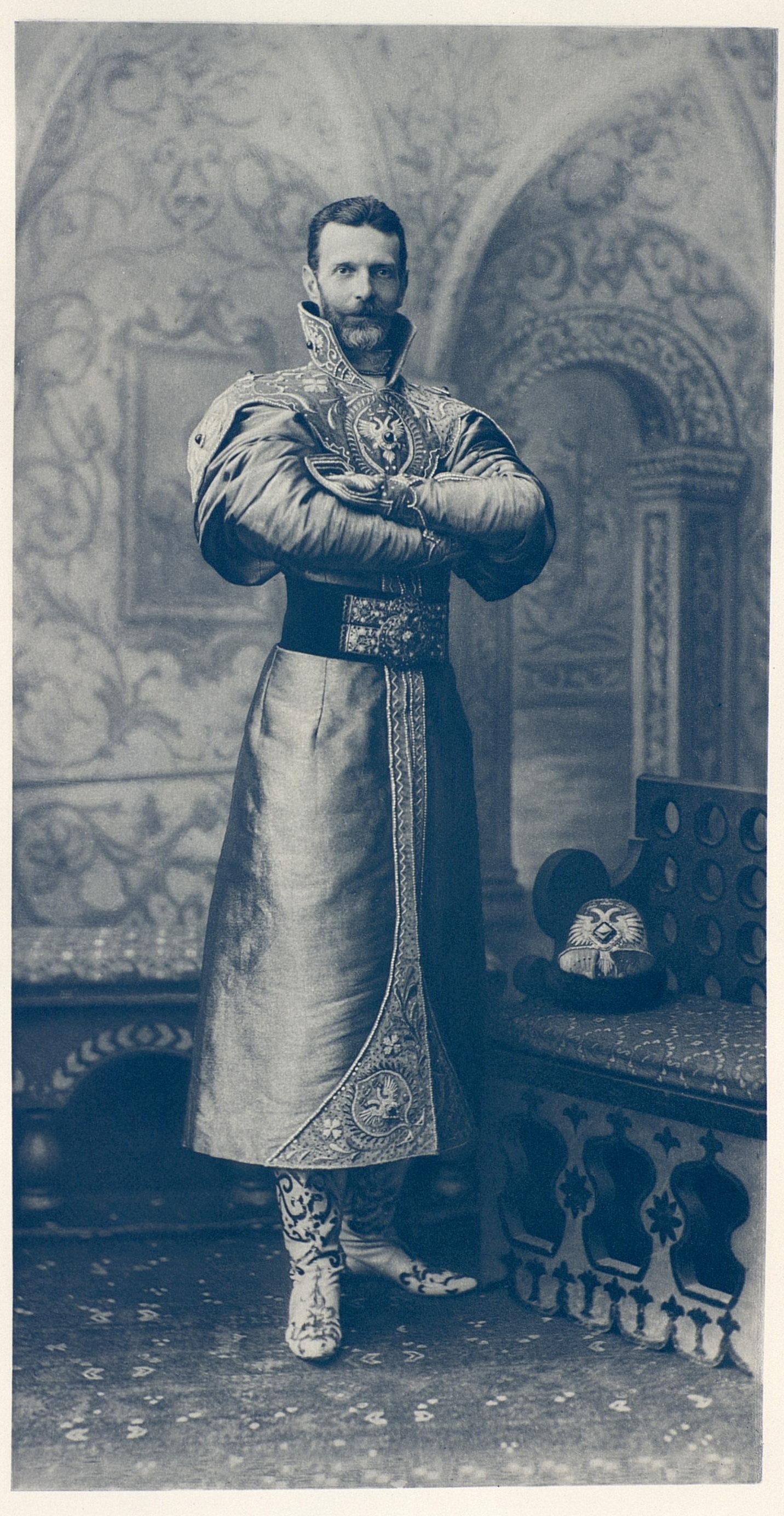
Grand Duke Sergei Alexandrovich in his ball costume

He was the son of Colonel (later, Major-General) Sergey Solomko (1835-1897), who was employed in the service of Grand Duke Konstantin Nikolayevich, and he grew up in the Konstantinovsky Palace.

From 1883 to 1887, he attended the Moscow School of Painting, Sculpture and Architecture then, for a year, audited classes at the Imperial Academy of Arts. Around this time, he began work as a magazine illustrator. His first known work of this type was for Север (North) a weekly literary journal that began publication in 1888. Shortly after, he was employed by Нива (Grainfield), which was Russia's most popular magazine at the end of the 19th century. He also worked for Мир искусства (World of Art) and a satirical journal called Шут (The Fool).

In the 1890s, he worked for Aleksey Suvorin, providing illustrations for stories by Pushkin and Chekhov and the poem The Song of the Merchant Kalashnikov by Lermontov. In 1901, he was one of several artists who illustrated a special edition of Dead Souls by Gogol, published by Adolf Marks. He also designed theater posters and a popular series of postcards depicting old Russia, published by Maison Lapine of Paris.

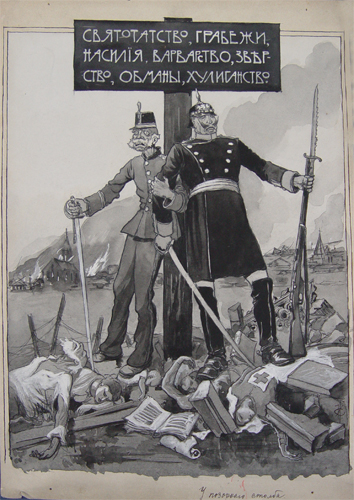
Sketch for a war poster ("The Pillory", 1916)

After 1900, his popularity led him to try his hand at a wider variety of design projects. He created models for the Imperial Porcelain Factory and worked with the House of Fabergé. In 1903, for the famous Ball in the Winter Palace, he consulted with experts and created sketches for elaborate historical costumes. Guests at the ball paid a fortune for them, as many were made with real jewelry. Later, a limited edition gift album with photographs of the participants was published, with "donations" benefitting Russian troops in the Far East. Some of the original costumes were displayed at the Hermitage Museum in 2003.

In 1910, he moved to Paris, but continued to exhibit in Russia and contribute to Russian magazines. During World War I, under the direction of the "Комиссия для сбора и хранения трофеев настоящей войны" (Commission to Collect and Store the Spoils of War), he painted portraits of the officers of the Russian Expeditionary Force in France for eventual use in a war museum.

After the Revolution, he fell out of favor with the new government, became a self-imposed exile, and began to work with those who had recently left Russia. Drawing on his earlier costume design experience, he created costumes for the dancers Mathilde Kschessinska and Anna Pavlova. He also created illustrations for books by French authors, including Émile Gebhart, Ernest Renan and Albert Samain.

In 1921, he participated in an exhibition staged by exiles from the former Imperial Academy of Arts (renamed the "Petrograd Free Art Educational Studios"). Four years later, he helped establish the "Russian Art and Industry Institute". He became seriously ill not long after, and died while convalescing at the "Maison Russe", a retirement home for White émigrés just south of Paris.

During the Soviet period, he was criticized for "decadence" and "bourgeois vulgarity". In the 1990s, interest in his work was renewed. It is especially valued for its accurate and detailed depictions of old Russian culture.

== Selected postcards ==
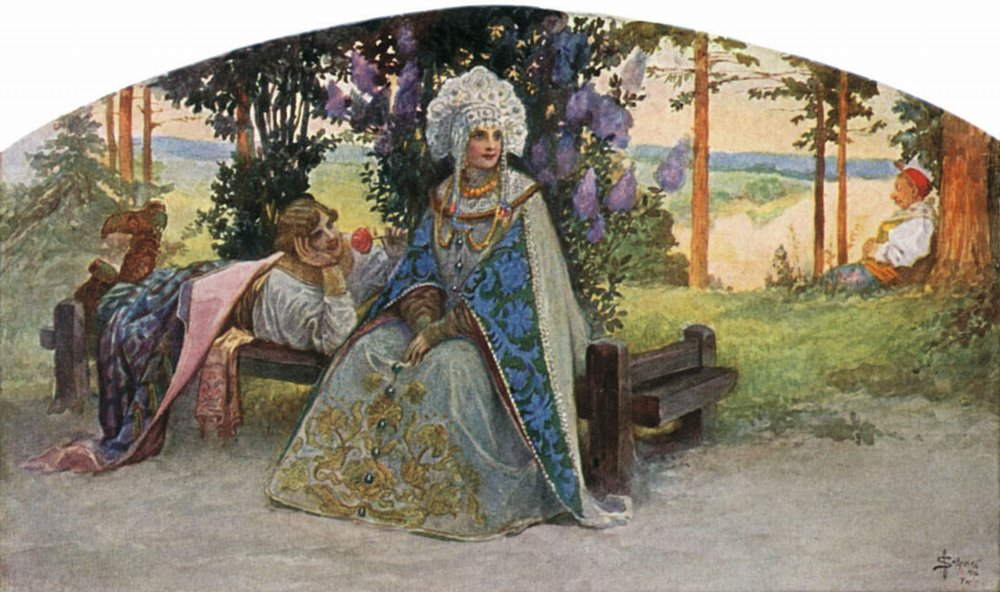
Beguiled

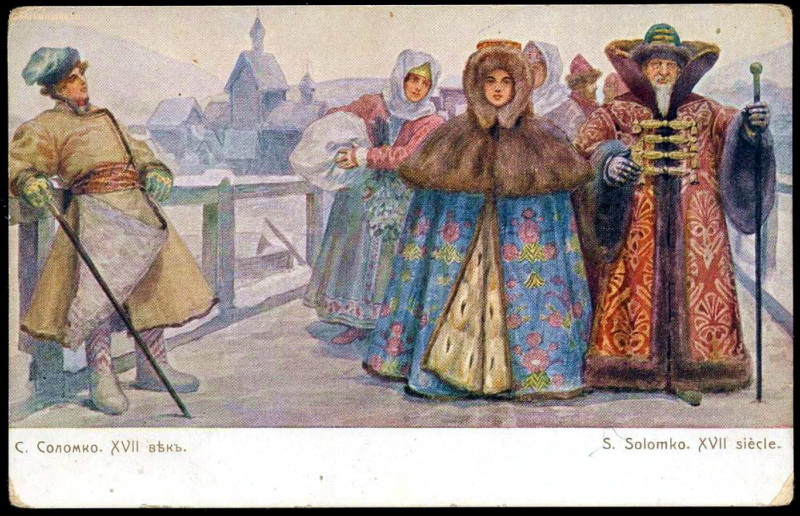
Seventeenth-Century Scene

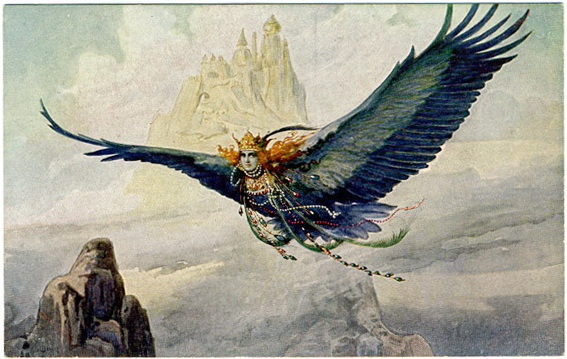
Fantasy

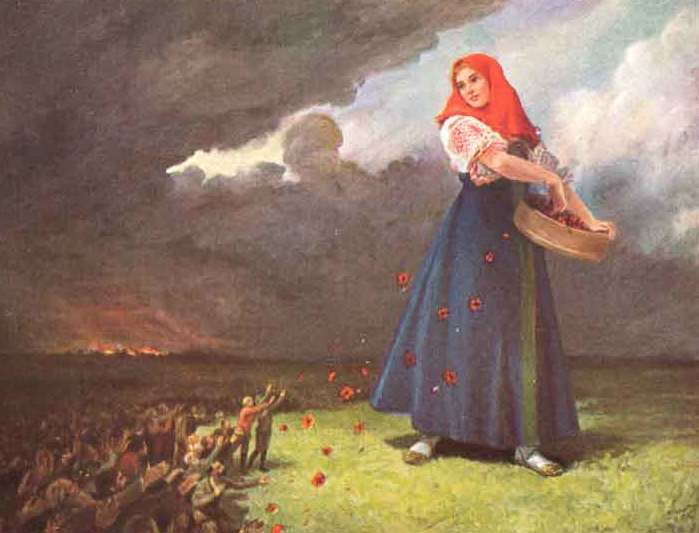
The New Russia (Sow the reasonable, the good and the eternal... 1917)
