= Sarafan =

Traditional sleeveless Russian overdress

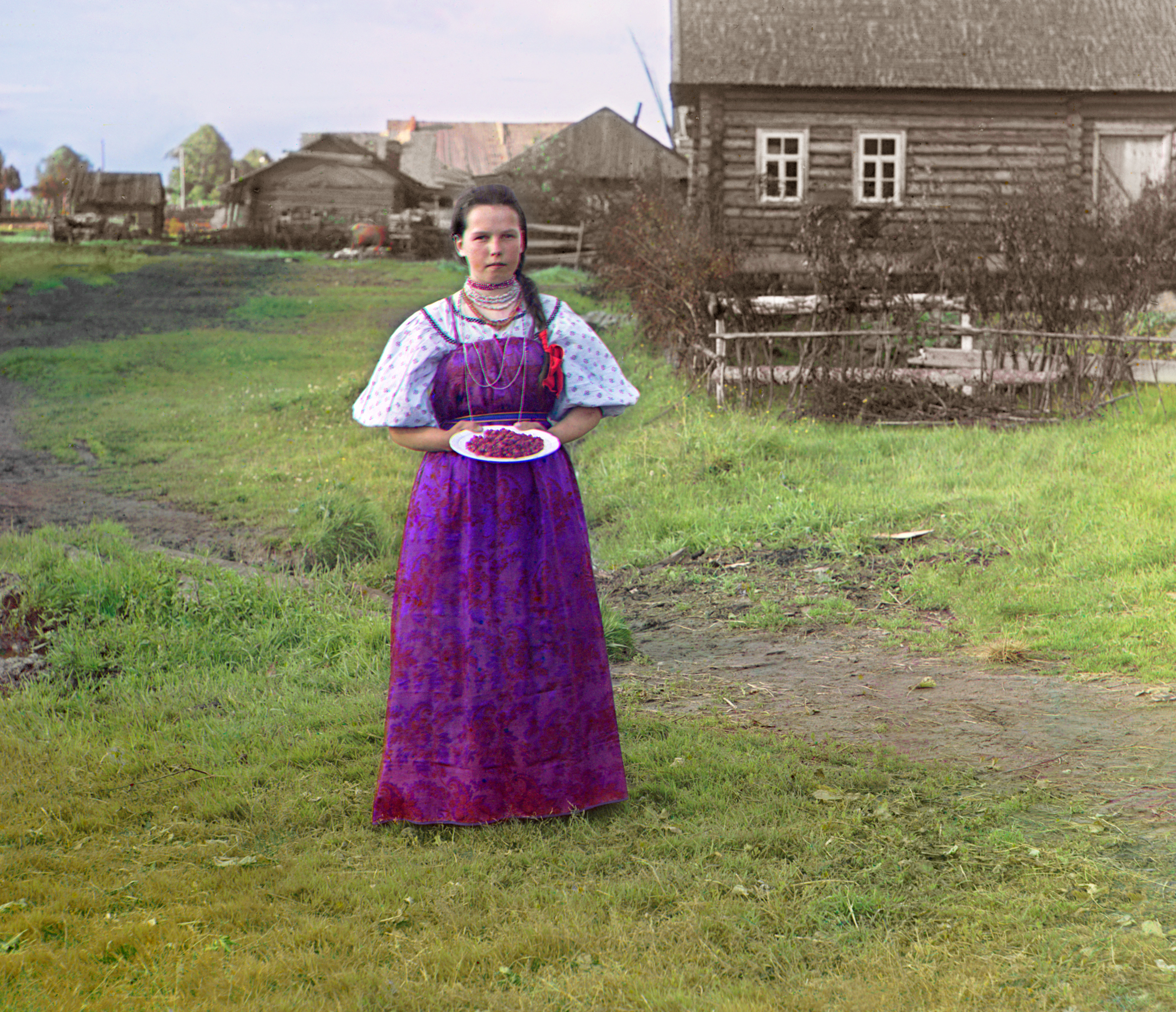
A peasant girl wearing a sarafan (1909), by Sergey Prokudin-Gorsky

A sarafan (Russian: сарафа́н, IPA: [sərɐˈfan], from Persian: سراپا sarāpā, literally "[from] head to feet") is a long, trapezoidal Russian dress worn by girls and women and forming part of Russian traditional folk costume.

Traditional Russian costume consists of straight, flowing lines. Beginning at the turn of the 18th century, the sarafan became the most popular article of peasant women's clothing in the Northern and Central regions of Russia. Sarafans were regularly worn until well into the 20th century, having first been mentioned in chronicles dating back to the year 1376. The origin of the term Sarafan lies in Persia, but the structure of the sarafan was inspired by Viking women clothing. Old Russia cultivated especially during the era of Grand Principality of Moscow strong ties to Western Asia and Southwest Asia and served also as an intermediary in the trade between European countries like Sweden, and Asian countries like Persia, and what is today Turkey. The sarafan most likely originated from a kaftan-like costume that was worn in Russia by women and men. Sarafans became most popular in the Central and Northern Russian regions. Through trade with Central Europe, the quality and colour of clothes grew.

Sarafans had originally a tighter form but became wider through the influence of the Russian Orthodox Church.

After the reforms of Peter the Great, which also introduced various Westernised or modernised cultural standards to Russia (with contention), only peasants wore the sarafan for daily use, while the upper classes switched to Central European fashion.

In many areas of the former Grand Principality of Moscow and today's Southern Russia the ponyova skirts were also worn by women. Today the garment is most often seen at performances of Russian folk song and dance, and is worn on Russian folk and religious holidays. Designers from Russia, Belarus, and Ukraine are re-imagining the sarafan style with its old national heritage for the 21st century as a summertime light dress that can be with its modern shape a part of today's woman's wardrobe.

The outer layer of a matryoshka doll is traditionally depicted as wearing a sarafan.

== Russian sarafan ==
The first mention of the sarafan as a type of clothing in Russian literature can be found in the Nikon Chronicle of 1376. However, the sarafan became an attribute of women's clothing in the 16th-17th centuries, before which it was men's clothing. During the reforms of Peter the Great, the sarafan, like traditional clothing in general, fell out of use among noble girls and women, remaining among commoners (both in the city and in the village) and merchant women. According to some scholars, the sarafan penetrated into peasant life in the 18th century, before which it was an attribute of the wardrobe exclusively of city women. In the 19th century, the sarafan was the most common clothing of Russian peasant women, worn mainly in the central zone , the Russian North and the Volga region (interestingly, the boundaries of the sarafan's distribution area roughly follow the borders of Muscovite Russia in the 16th-17th centuries). However, the sarafan subsequently spread to the southern Russian provinces, becoming an element of the costume of unmarried girls (while married women wore poneva ). The sarafan as an item of traditional costume was worn in everyday life until the 1920s, and old women continued to wear it until the 1940s.

== Description ==
As with many items of folk costume (especially women's), the sarafan has many regional differences in cut and names. However, despite this, it is possible to identify common features characteristic of this type of clothing. As a rule, a sarafan was made from one or more pieces of fabric. The fabrics used to make sarafans varied greatly: home-made material was used - broadcloth , canvas , motley , and so on; and later - factory-made fabrics. Initially, sarafans, like all peasant clothing, were made from undyed fabric in natural colors. However, at the beginning of the 19th century, dyed factory-made fabrics became widespread. Most often, sarafans were dyed blue, red, and black. Girls and young women wore red or burgundy sayans, while older women wore blue and black ones.

Sarafans were divided into everyday (workday, budennye ) and festive. Everyday sarafans, made from the simplest and most accessible fabrics, were sparsely decorated - only on the top or along the front flap and hem. Stripes of red calico or textile ribbons with a muted pattern were sewn onto everyday sarafans. Festive sarafans were made from expensive fabrics - brocade , silk , taffeta , red calico , cashmere , printed fabrics , and so on. Festive everyday sarafans were decorated along the hem with "chitan" ("gaitan", "gaitanchik") - a thin 1 cm home-made braid made of red wool. The top was decorated with a strip of velvet . Also, festive sarafans were trimmed with silk ribbons, braid, fringe, metallic lace, fabric appliqués and braid.

Since the 1920s, the term "sarafan" has meant any sleeveless dress, and not just this element of folk costume.

== Types and styles of sarafans in Russia ==
A closed, slightly slanted sarafan ( shushun , shushpan , nasova, feryaz , dubas ) is the most archaic type of sarafan, distinguished by its tunic-like cut and wide armholes (although it could also have straps). Initially, it was made from a single piece of cloth folded in half, which formed the front and back of the sarafan, respectively; later, wedges were sewn onto the sides (see below). Most often, it was made from red cloth and white and blue canvas. There is a small button fastening in the front, which made it easier for the wearer to pull the sarafan over her head. Some examples have false sleeves, which served a decorative function and are remnants of the sarafan's original role as outerwear. The gore-waist sarafan (kosoklinnik) is a type of sarafan that evolved from the closed one. It was made from three panels—one at the back and two at the front. The front of the gore-waist sarafan had a slit and a button fastening, which could also be decorative, and the slit was correspondingly sewn. Thus, unlike the closed one, which was pulled over the head, the gore-waist sarafan was open. This type received its name from a particular cut—additional gores were sewn onto the sides of the front and back panels, which gave the sarafan some width. The neckline was square or round [ 18 ] . Young girls wore sarafans with a narrow back and straps, while older women wore ones with a narrow back and wide armholes. Slant-gore sarafans were made from "hair" —sheep's wool , woven and dyed black with a decoction of alder and oak. Everyday slant-gore sarafans were universally made of blue canvas. Due to their many structural elements, slant-gore sarafans were very heavy, especially the festive ones.

The straight, or round, sarafan was the most common type of sarafan by the mid-19th century. It consisted of a wide skirt made of several (four to eight) panels, gathered at the chest and fitted with straps. The round sarafan, distinguished by its ease of manufacture (and therefore quickly supplanting the slanted sarafan), was made from factory-made fabrics in bright colors. Initially, round sarafans were worn by girls and young women, but over time they came to be worn by all ages. Everyday straight sarafans were made from home-made motley or factory-made fabrics in dark colors. The sarafan with a bodice is the most recent type of sarafan, having developed from the straight one, which appeared in the late 19th and early 20th centuries, and was widespread primarily in the central zone and in the north in places closer to large cities (in particular, in the Moscow region and Tver province ). It consisted of a full gathered skirt, to which a bodice with straps and a fastening on the side was sewn on top , tightly enveloping the wearer's torso.

== Gallery ==
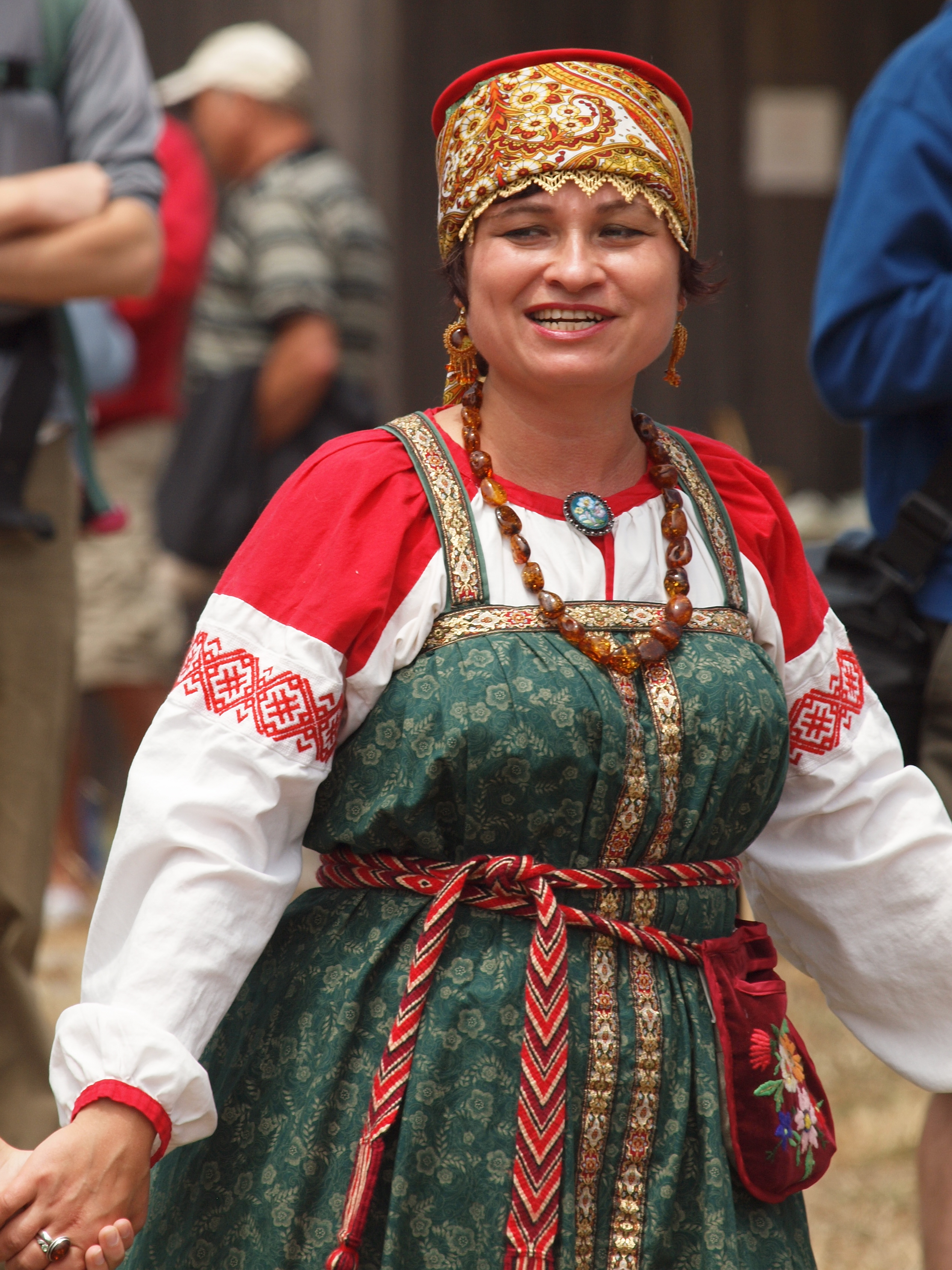
Sarafan worn with a Kokoshnik for a Russian folk festival

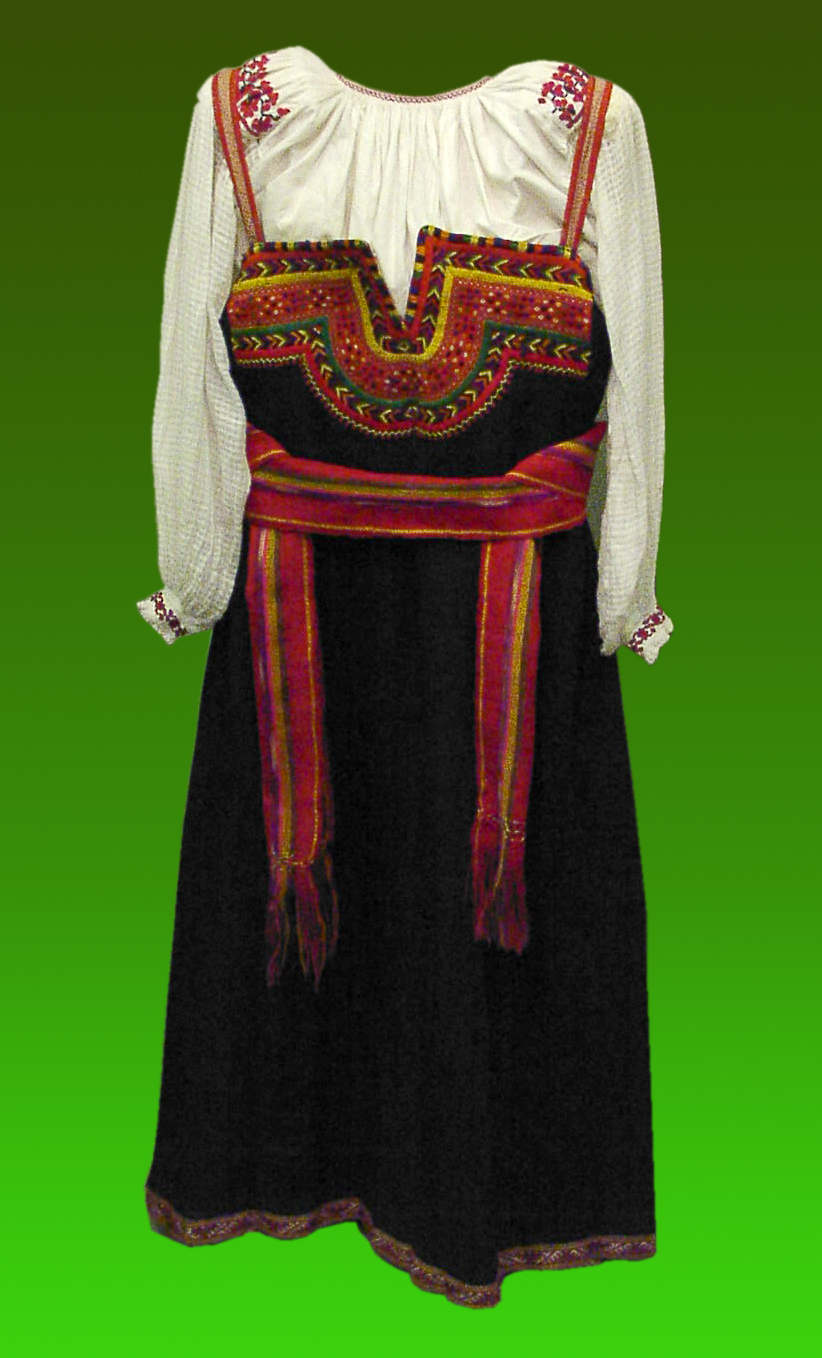
A simple black sarafan from Belgorod Oblast

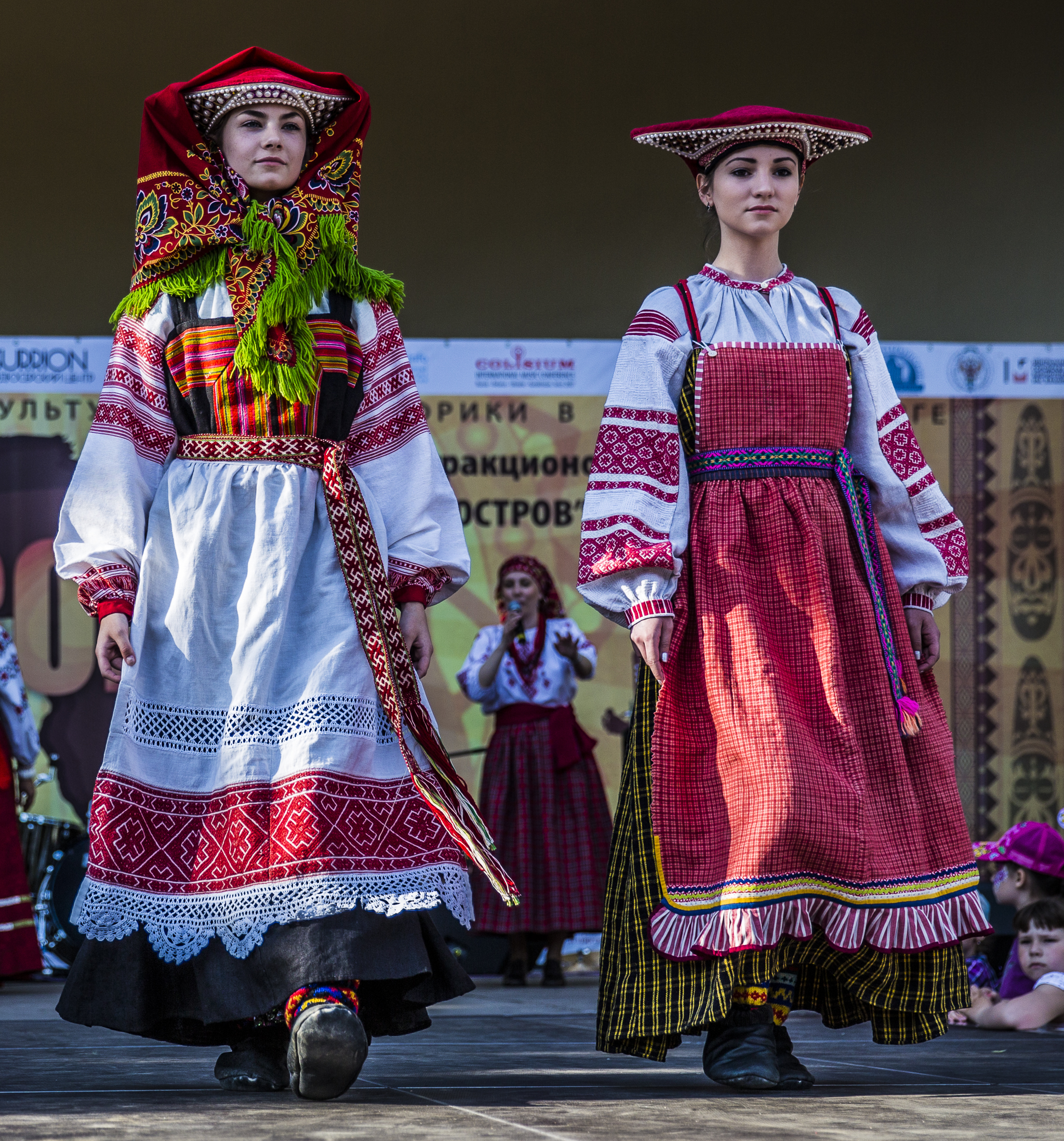
Ethnic Russian clothes

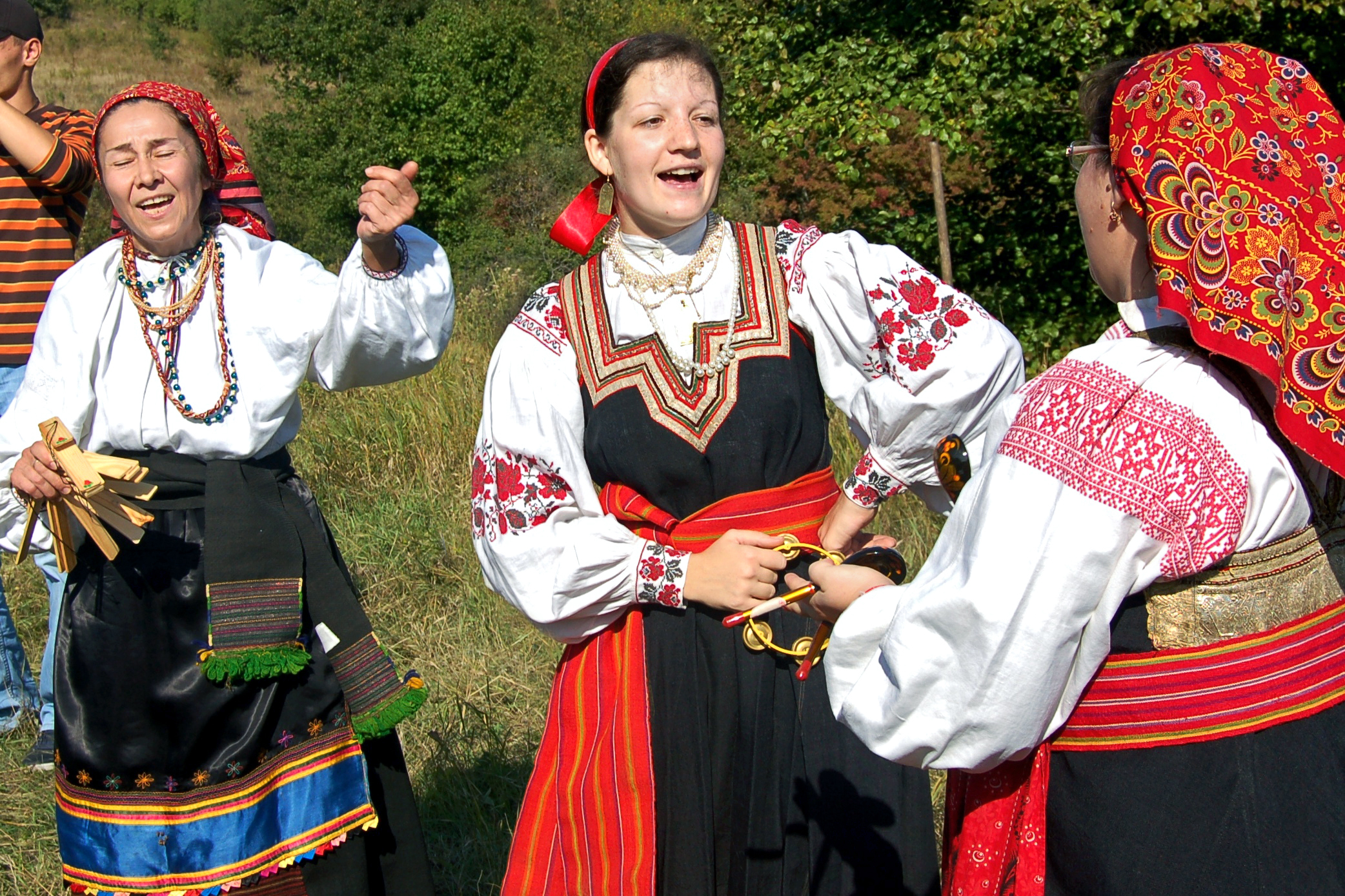
Russian women with treshchotka and spoons in their hands. The two women on the right are wearing Sarafans.

== See also ==
- Jumper dress
- Pinafore
