= 1903 ball in the Winter Palace =

Costume ball in Saint Petersburg

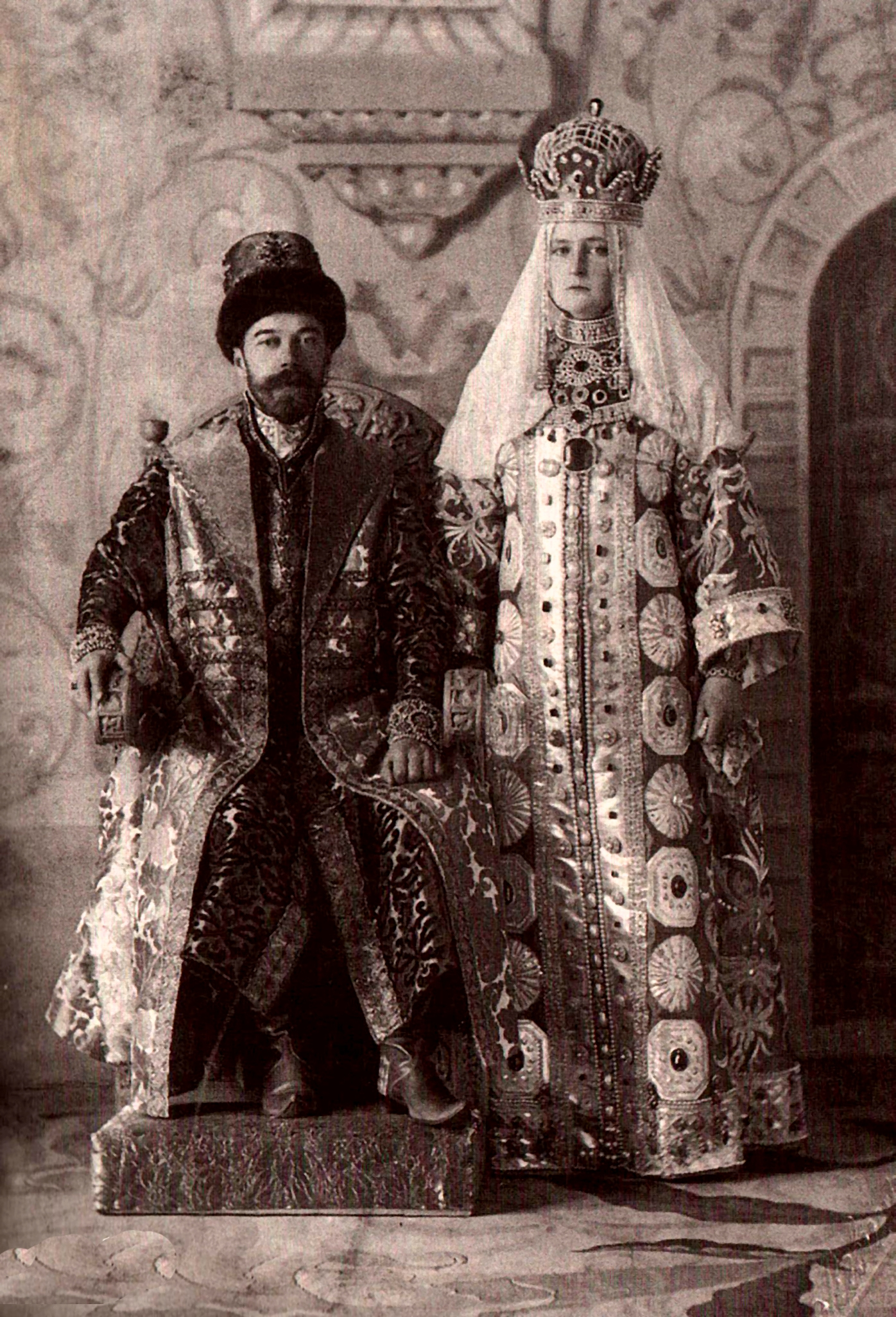
Emperor Nicholas II and Empress Alexandra in the garbs of Tsar Alexei Mikhailovich and his first wife Tsaritsa Maria Miloslavskaya

The 1903 ball in the Winter Palace (Russian: Костюмированный бал 1903 года, lit. "Costume ball of 1903") was a luxurious ball during the reign of the Emperor Nicholas II of Russia. It was held in the Winter Palace, Saint Petersburg, in two stages, on February 11 and 13. All the visitors were in bejeweled 17th-century style costumes, made from designs by the artist Sergey Solomko, in collaboration with historical experts.

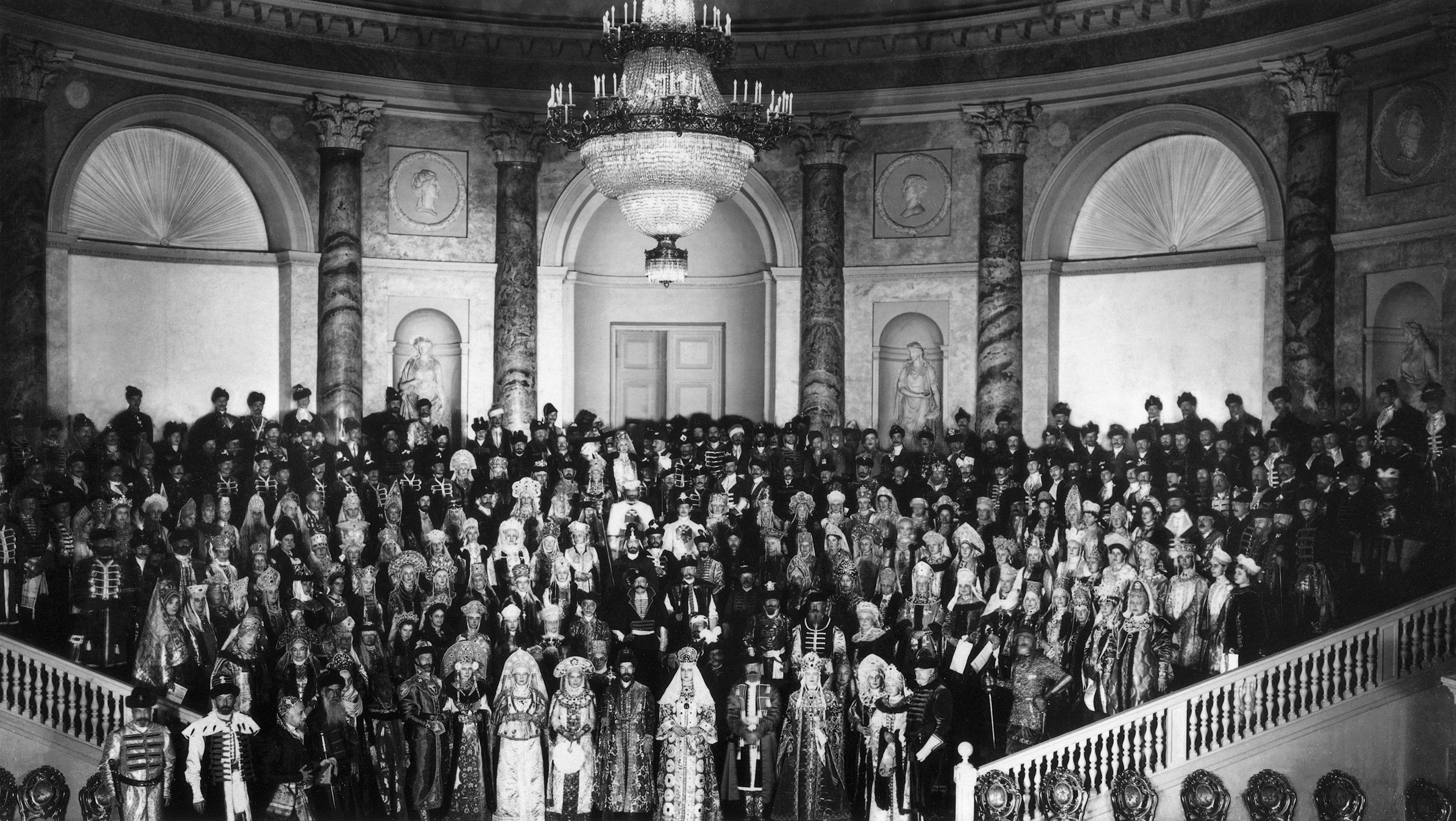
Group photo of all the guests at the ball

Grand Duke Alexander Mikhailovitch recalled the occasion as "the last spectacular ball in the history of the empire ... [but] a new and hostile Russia glared through the large windows of the palace ... while we danced, the workers were striking and the clouds in the Far East were hanging dangerously low."

The entire Imperial family posed in 17th-century costumes, Emperor Nicholas as Alexis, the Empress Alexandra as Maria Miloslavskaya, in the Hermitage Theatre, many wearing priceless original items brought specially from the Kremlin, for what was to be their final photograph together.

== Photographs from the souvenir album ==
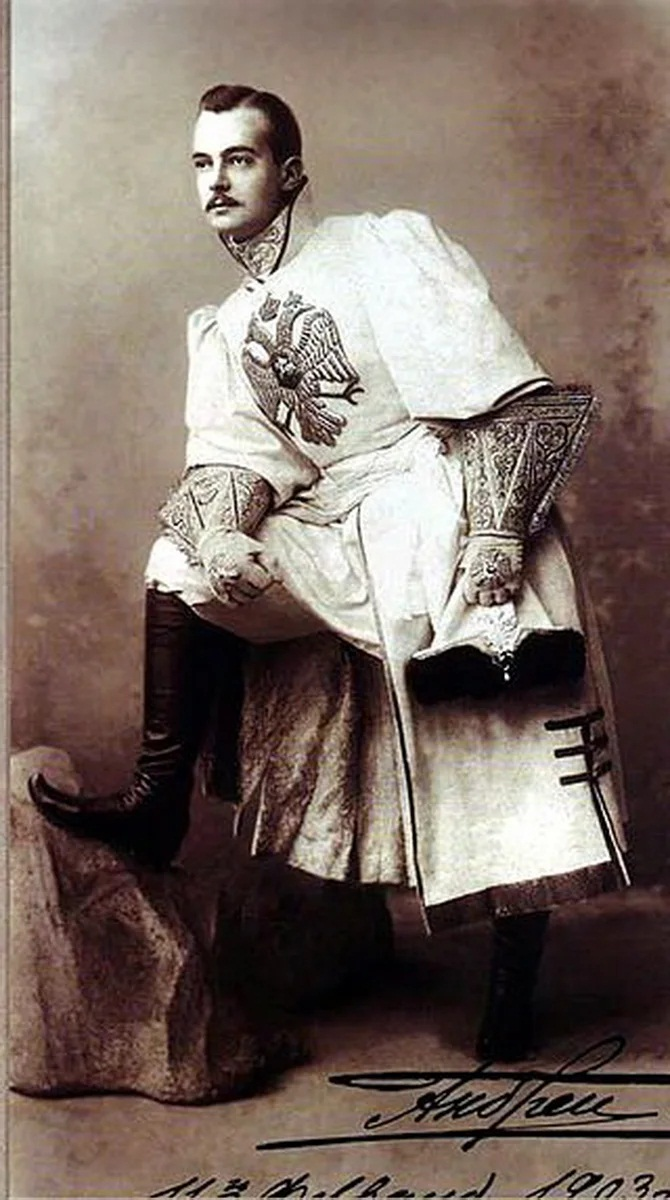
Grand Duke Andrei Vladimirovich

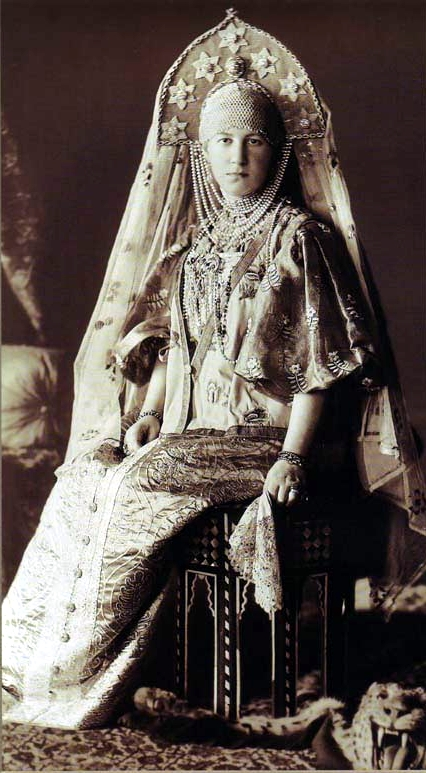
Princess Maria of Greece and Denmark

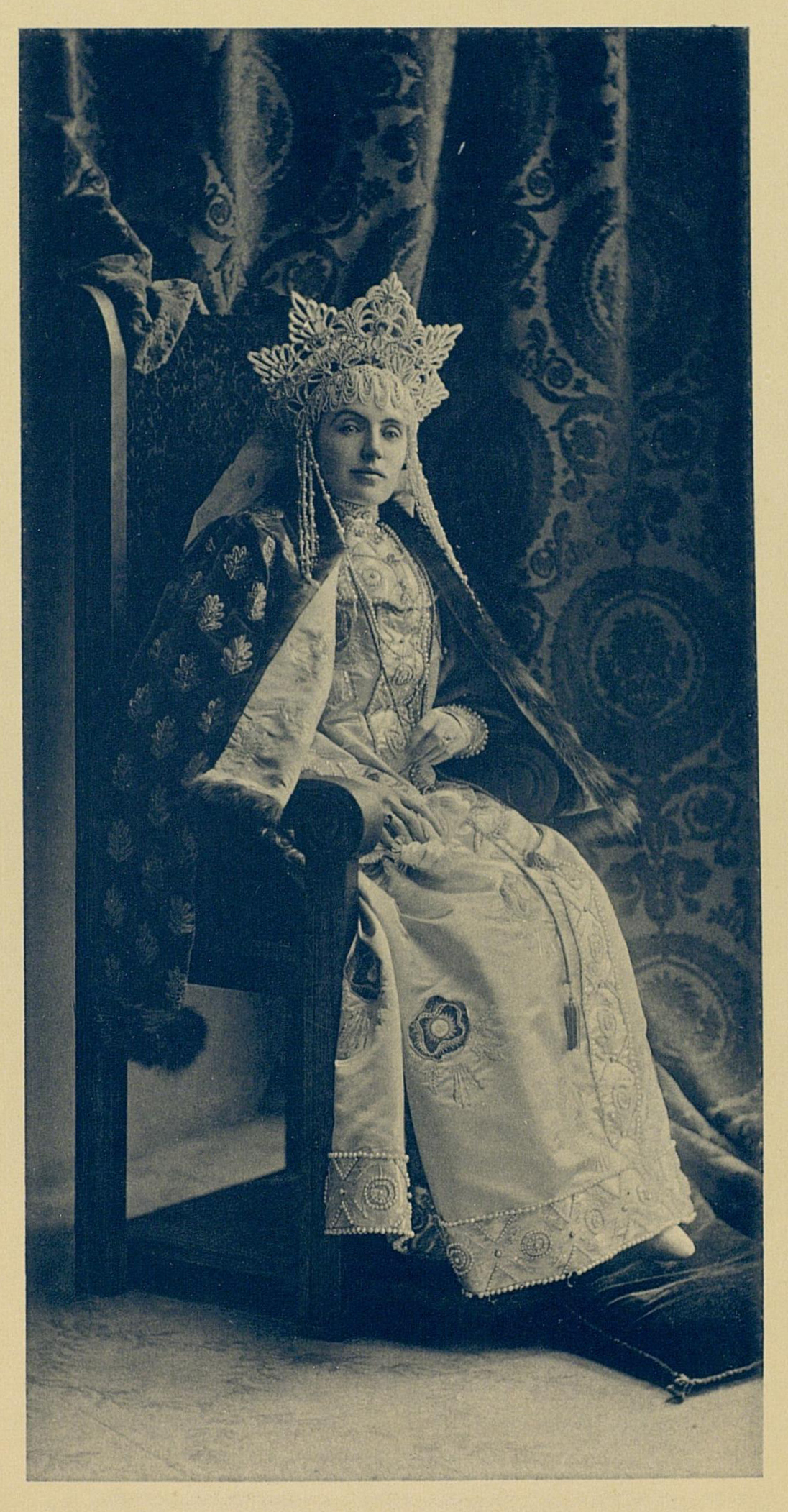
Baroness Emma Freederiksz

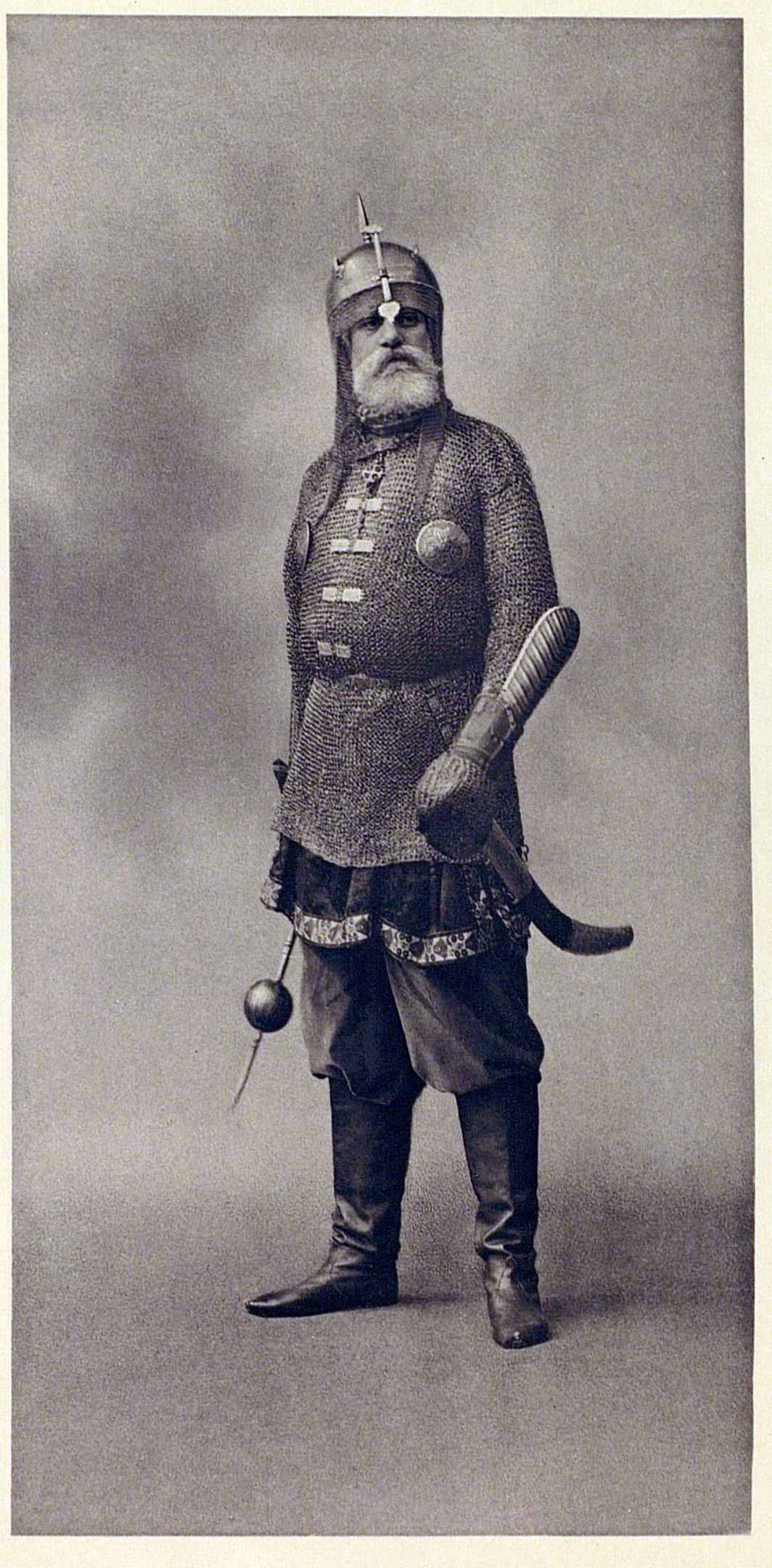
Feofil Meyendorf

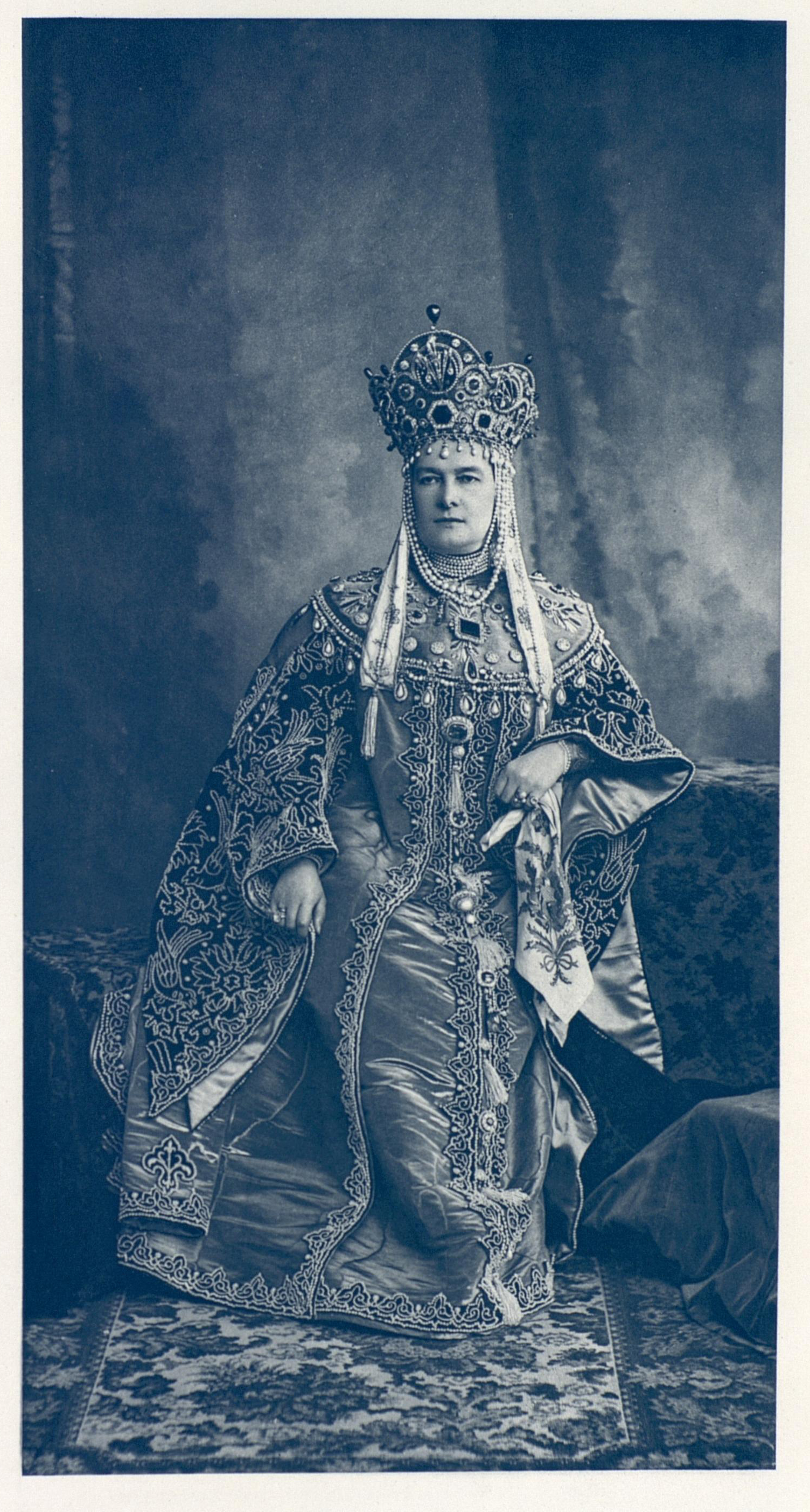
Grand Duchess Maria Pavlovna the Elder

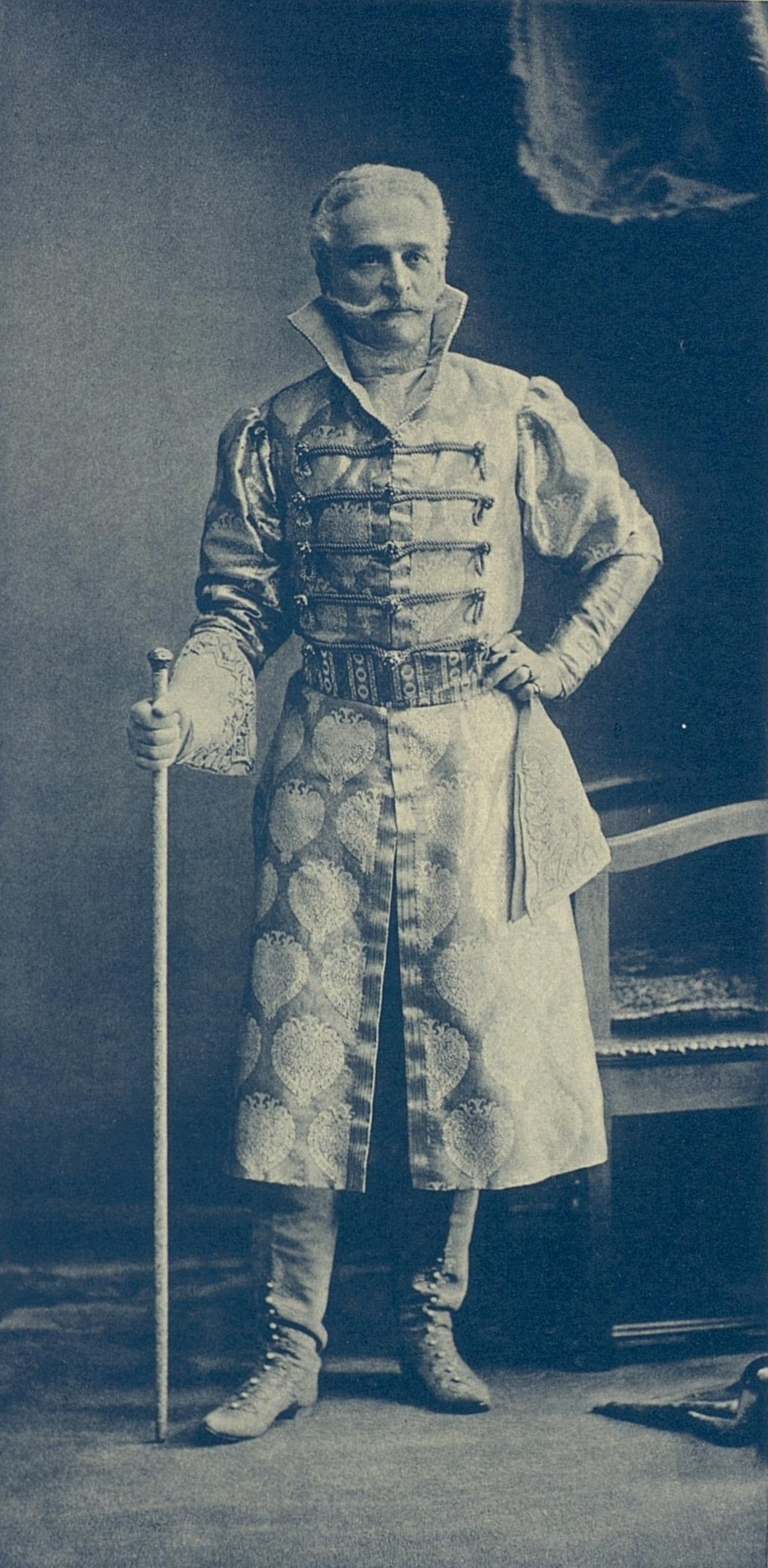
Konstantin Gorchakov

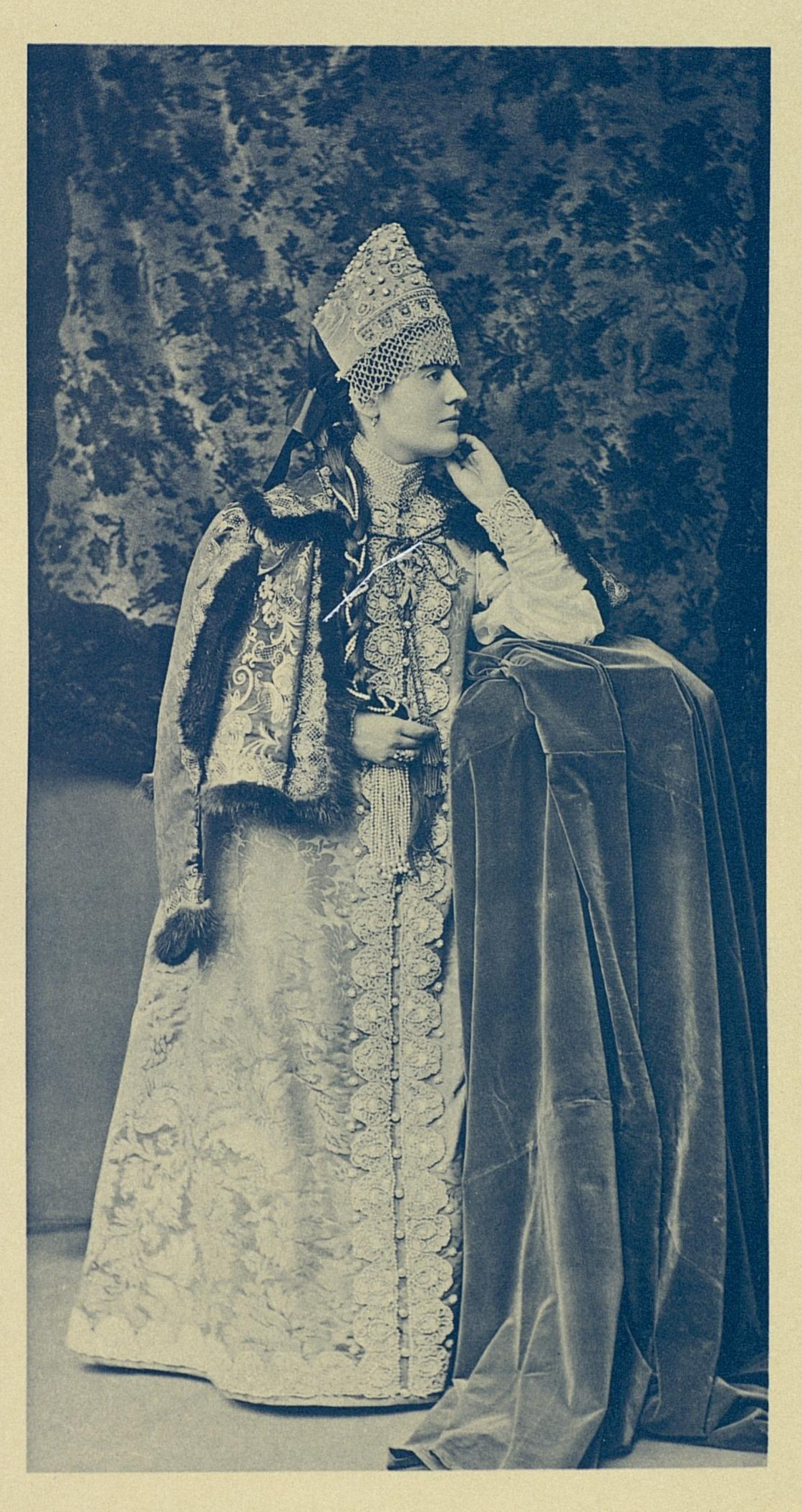
Maria Nikolayevna Voeikova

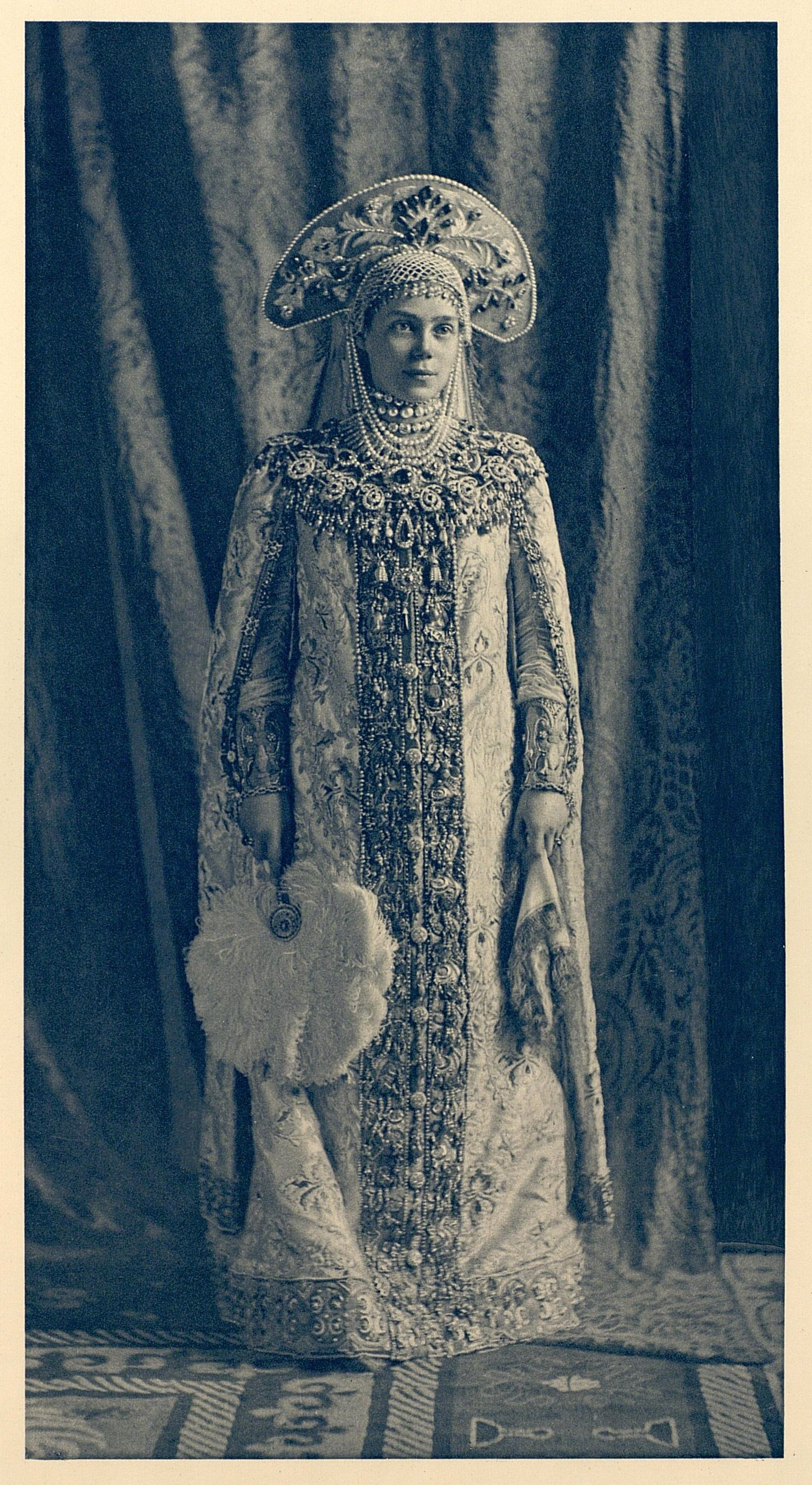
Grand Duchess Xenia Alexandrovna of Russia

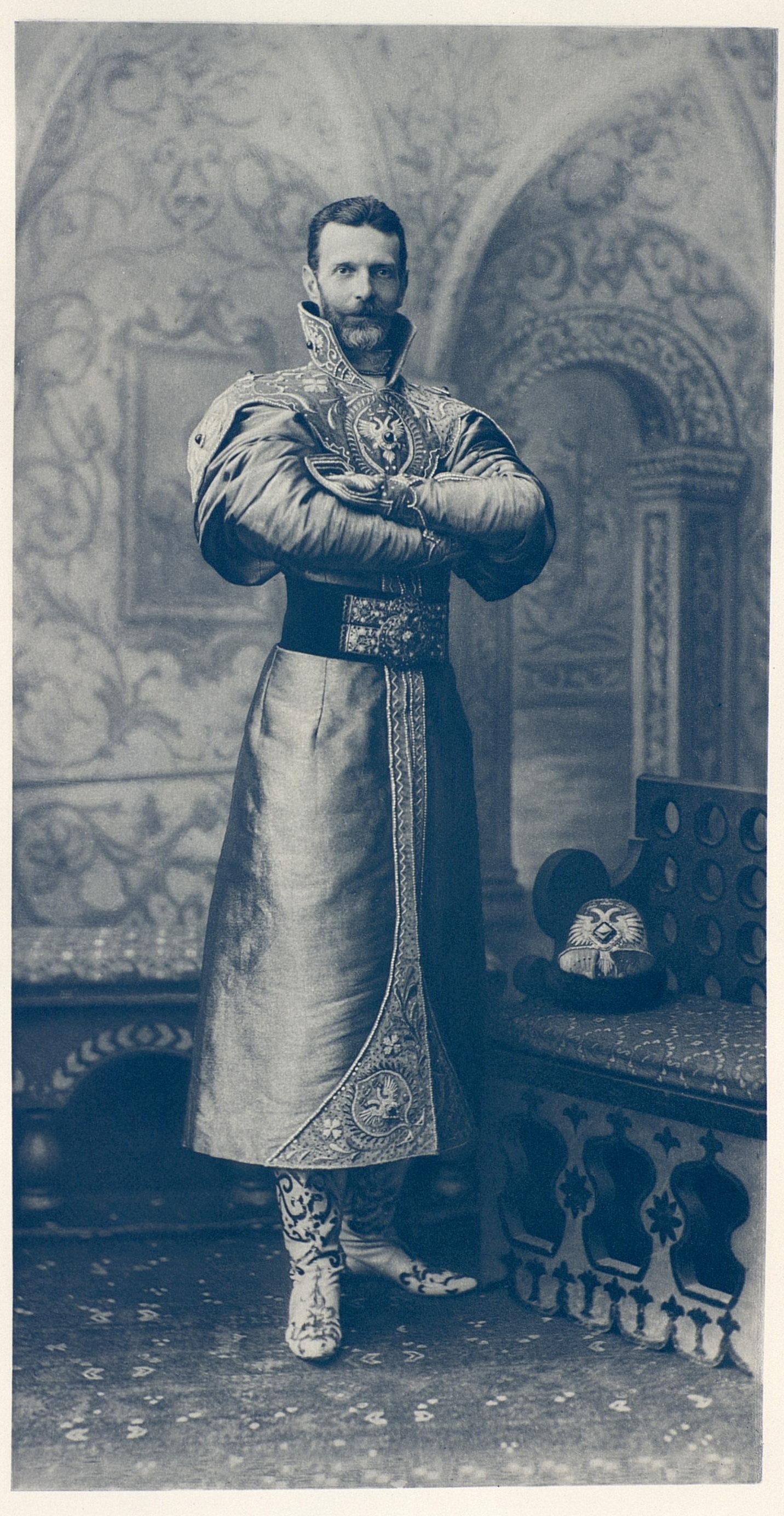
Grand Duke Sergei Alexandrovich
