= Deaths in February 2024 =

The following is a list of notable deaths in February 2024.

Entries for each day are listed alphabetically by surname. A typical entry lists information in the following sequence:

- Name, age, country of citizenship at birth, subsequent country of citizenship (if applicable), reason for notability, cause of death (if known), and reference.

== February 2024 ==
=== 1 ===
- Asahi, 21, Japanese professional wrestler (Ice Ribbon, Actwres girl'Z), traffic collision.
- Pearl Berg, 114, American supercentenarian.
- Walter Biel, 90, Swiss journalist and politician, MP (1967–1991).
- Ásmundur Bjarnason, 96, Icelandic Olympic sprinter (1948, 1952).
- Chang Chuan-chiung, 95, Taiwanese pharmacologist, member of Academia Sinica and founder of the Journal of Biomedical Science.
- Katerina Clark, 82, Australian Soviet scholar, lymphoma.
- Sir Roland Franklin, 97, British-born Antiguan merchant banker.
- Mark Gustafson, 63, American animator (The PJs, Fantastic Mr. Fox) and film director (Guillermo del Toro's Pinocchio), Oscar winner (2022), heart attack.
- Patrick Hanks, 83, English lexicographer and linguist, COVID-19.
- Michael Hicks, 51, American football player (Chicago Bears).
- Wilburn Hollis, 83, American football player (Iowa Hawkeyes).
- Michel Jazy, 87, French middle-distance runner, Olympic silver medallist (1960).
- Alonzo Johnson, 60, American football player (Florida Gators, Philadelphia Eagles).
- Grace Joncas, 100, American politician, member of the New Hampshire House of Representatives.
- Larry Kessler, 81, American activist.
- Mike Kiegerl, 84, German-born American politician, member of the Kansas House of Representatives (2005–2017).
- Garth Manton, 94, Australian rower, Olympic bronze medalist (1956).
- Mike Martin, 79, American Hall of Fame college baseball coach (Florida State Seminoles), complications from Lewy body dementia.
- Gilbert Millet, 93, French physician and politician, three-time deputy, mayor of Alès (1985–1989).
- Nereo Odchimar, 83, Filipino Roman Catholic prelate, bishop of Tandag (2001–2018), metabolic encephalopathy.
- Winfried Orthmann, 88, German archaeologist.
- Honesto Pacana, 91, Filipino Roman Catholic prelate, bishop of Malaybalay (1994–2010).
- Burkhard Pape, 91, German football player (Hannover 96) and manager (Uganda national team, Tanzania national team).
- Carolyn Powers, 98, American politician, member of the Washington House of Representatives (1983–1985).
- Harunur Rashid, 87, Bangladeshi film director (Megher Onek Rong) and writer.
- Jim Rowinski, 63, American basketball player (Purdue Boilermakers, Detroit Pistons, Philadelphia 76ers).
- Jeannot Schaul, 75, Luxembourgish footballer (Jeunesse Esch, national team).
- Carlota Sempé, 81, Argentine archaeologist.
- Constantinos Stathelakos, 36, Cypriot Olympic hammer thrower (2012), traffic collision.
- Orhan Türkdoğan, 95, Turkish sociologist.

=== 2 ===
- Alev Alatlı, 79, Turkish novelist and columnist.
- Luciano Alfieri, 87, Italian footballer (AC Milan, Treviso, national team).
- Chris Aspin, 91, English author, historian and journalist.
- Valery Ataev, 75, Uzbek engineer and politician.
- Daniel Atkinson, 102, American biochemist.
- Jean-Pierre Babelon, 91, French historian, president of the Académie des Inscriptions et Belles-Lettres (2001).
- Abdul Hamid Bakal, 84, Bruneian nobleman, member of the Legislative Council (2011–2015, 2017–2022).
- Mohammed Shamsul Hoque Bhuiyan, 75, Bangladeshi politician, MP (2014–2024).
- Daoud Yaya Brahim, 62, Chadian military leader and politician, minister of defense (2021–2023).
- Steve Brown, 66, British composer, lyricist and record producer, pulmonary fibrosis.
- Rich Caster, 75, American football player (New York Jets, Houston Oilers, Washington Redskins), complications from Parkinson's disease.
- Dean Dohrman, 64, American politician, member of the Missouri House of Representatives (2013–2021).
- Osvaldo Domínguez Dibb, 83, Paraguayan football executive, president of Club Olimpia (1974–1990, 1995–2004).
- Wilhelmenia Fernandez, 75, American soprano, cancer.
- Christos Fotiou, 85, Greek lawyer and politician, MP (1981–1989).
- H. E. Francis, 100, American scholar, academic and writer.
- Yusuf Gowon, 85, Ugandan military officer, chief of army staff (1978–1979).
- Geoffrey Hickinbottom, 91, English cricketer (Leicestershire).
- Paulin J. Hountondji, 81, Beninese philosopher.
- Hu Hesheng, 95, Chinese mathematician, member of the Chinese Academy of Sciences.
- Jonnie Irwin, 50, English television presenter (A Place in the Sun, Escape to the Country, To Buy or Not to Buy), lung cancer.
- Francisco Jara, 82, Mexican footballer (Guadalajara, national team).
- Wayne Kramer, 75, American guitarist (MC5) and songwriter ("Kick Out the Jams"), pancreatic cancer.
- Louis Lambert, 92, Belgian footballer (Royal Antwerp, national team).
- Ian Lavender, 77, English actor (Dad's Army, EastEnders, Parsley Sidings).
- Honor McKellar, 103, New Zealand operatic mezzo-soprano.
- Sadhu Meher, 84, Indian actor (Ankur, Mrigayaa, Debshishu) and film director.
- Luis Morales Reyes, 87, Mexican Roman Catholic prelate, bishop of Tacámbaro (1979–1985) and Torreón (1990–1999) and archbishop of San Luis Potosí (1999–2012).
- Don Murray, 94, American actor (Bus Stop, A Hatful of Rain, The Plainsman).
- Oskar Negt, 89, German philosopher and sociologist.
- Lorenzo Olarte Cullen, 91, Spanish politician, president of the Canary Islands (1988–1991).
- Marian Pilot, 87, Polish writer and poet.
- Christopher Priest, 80, English novelist (Fugue for a Darkening Island, The Affirmation, The Prestige), small-cell carcinoma.
- Pierre Raffin, 85, French Roman Catholic prelate, bishop of Metz (1987–2013).
- Claudio Rissi, 67, Argentine actor (El marginal, The Desert Bride, Tiger, Blood in the Mouth), cancer.
- Gregory Charles Rivers, 58, Australian actor (Man from Guangdong, Triumph in the Skies, Under the Canopy of Love), suicide by charcoal-burning.
- Xavier Robson, 37, Brazilian footballer (Peñarol, Tacuarembó, Pelotas), cancer.
- Rod Rosenbladt, 82, American Lutheran theologian and academic (Concordia University Irvine).
- Vincenzo Ruggiero, 73, Italian-born British sociologist.
- Lev Sarkisov, 85, Armenian mountaineer.
- John Walker, 75, American computer programmer, co-founder of Autodesk, complications from a fall.
- Carl Weathers, 76, American actor (Rocky, Predator, Happy Gilmore) and football player, atherosclerotic cardiovascular disease.
- Baruch Weisbecker, 83, Israeli Haredi rabbi, cancer.
- Stefan Yanev, 84, Bulgarian footballer (Spartak Varna, Cherno More Varna) and sports commentator (BNT).

=== 3 ===
- Aston "Family Man" Barrett, 77, Jamaican musician (Bob Marley and the Wailers, The Upsetters).
- Hugh Burkhardt, 88, British theoretical physicist.
- Bill Carr, 78, American football player, coach and executive (Florida Gators).
- Giannis Chaniotis, 89, Greek footballer (AEK Athens, Egaleo).
- Bruce DeMars, 88, American admiral.
- Samuel C. Florman, 99, American civil engineer.
- Ángel Franco Martínez, 85, Spanish football referee.
- Arthur M. Gignilliat Jr., 91, American politician, member of the Georgia House of Representatives (1966–1980).
- Charles González Palisa, 82, Argentine-born Paraguayan television show host, complications from heart surgery.
- Nicky Graham, 79, British musician (The End, Tucky Buzzard), songwriter and music producer, cancer.
- Jan Højland, 72, Danish footballer (B.93, 1860 Munich, national team).
- Tony Hutson, 49, American football player (Dallas Cowboys, Washington Redskins).
- Keith King, 75, American politician, member of the Colorado House of Representatives (1999–2007) and Senate (2009–2013).
- Bill Lachemann, 89, American baseball coach (Los Angeles Angels).
- Márcia Marinho, 60, Brazilian doctor and politician, deputy (1995–2001), cancer.
- Rade Milovanović, 69, Bosnian chess player.
- Steve Ostrow, 91, American businessman and LGBT rights activist, founder of Continental Baths.
- Pavel Ploc, 80, Czech Olympic biathlete (1968, 1972).
- Aleksey Poteleshchenko, 47, Ukrainian-Russian military officer and politician, shelling.
- Victor M. Power, 89, Canadian politician, mayor of Timmins, Ontario (1980–1988, 1991–2000, 2003–2006).
- Patricio Ricketts, 99, Peruvian journalist and politician, minister of labour and social promotion (1983) and education (1983–1984).
- Helena Rojo, 79, Mexican actress (The House in the South, The Great Adventure of Zorro, Misterio) and model, liver cancer.
- Abdullah Al-Saadawi, 76, Bahraini actor, director, and playwright.
- Vittorio Vidotto, 82, Italian historian.
- Vittorio Emanuele, Prince of Naples, 86, Italian royal, disputed head of the House of Savoy (since 1983).
- Ray Watters, 95, New Zealand geographer.
- Wee Cho Yaw, 95, Singaporean banker, chairman of UOB (1974–2013).

=== 4 ===
- Yōko Abe, 95, Japanese calligrapher and political matriarch.
- Sandy Air, 95, Canadian ice hockey player.
- Galina Alekseyeva, 76, Russian diver, Olympic bronze medallist (1964).
- Rafael Alvira, 81, Spanish philosopher.
- Brant Alyea, 83, American baseball player (Washington Senators, Minnesota Twins, Oakland Athletics).
- Bob Beckwith, 91, American firefighter (September 11 rescue efforts), cancer.
- Joel Belz, 82, American magazine publisher, founder of World.
- Agostino Borromeo, 80, Italian historian, general governor of the Order of the Holy Sepulchre (2009–2016).
- Dan L. Burk, 61, American legal scholar.
- Liliane Carlberg, 87, Swedish television producer.
- Earl Cureton, 66, American basketball player (Philadelphia 76ers, Detroit Pistons, Chicago Bulls), NBA champion (1983, 1994).
- Alice Darr, 93, American musician.
- N. K. Desam, 87, Indian poet and literary critic.
- Tania Díaz Castro, 84, Cuban journalist, poet, and activist.
- Hélène Egger, 95, Dutch Holocaust survivor.
- John Elford, 76, Australian rugby league player (Western Suburbs, New South Wales, national team).
- Brooke Ellison, 45, American academic and disability advocate.
- Al Francesco, 90, American blackjack player and gambling strategist.
- Hage Geingob, 82, Namibian politician, president (since 2015) and prime minister (1990–2002, 2012–2015), cancer.
- Kurt Hamrin, 89, Swedish footballer (AIK, Fiorentina, national team).
- Hardy Eustace, 27, Irish Thoroughbred racehorse.
- Hazem Hosny, 73, Egyptian political scientist.
- Bukar Ibrahim, 73, Nigerian politician, senator (2007–2019) and governor of Yobe State (1992–1993, 1999–2007).
- Barry John, 79, Welsh rugby union player (Cardiff, Barbarian, national team).
- John Kehoe, 89, Canadian politician, Quebec MNA (1981–1994).
- Desmond Kelly, 95, New Zealand actor (Dark Knight).
- Martin Kirkup, 75, British-born American music industry executive.
- Antonio Lenza, 84, Italian Olympic field hockey player (1960). (death announced on this date)
- Giacomo Losi, 88, Italian football player (Roma, national team) and manager (Piacenza).
- Enass Muzamel, 42–43, Sudanese human rights activist.
- Étienne Nodet, 79, French Roman Catholic priest and academic.
- Lowitja O'Donoghue, 91, Australian public administrator and Aboriginal activist.
- Antonio Paolucci, 84, Italian art historian, minister of culture (1995–1996) and director of the Vatican Museums (2007–2017).
- Papineau, 23, British Thoroughbred racehorse, euthanised.
- Rui Patrício, 91, Portuguese jurist and politician, minister of foreign affairs (1970–1974).
- Günter Petzow, 97, German materials scientist.
- Andrew Rogers, 92, Australian corporate and legal advisor, judge of the Supreme Court of New South Wales (1979–1993).
- Shen Rong, 88, Chinese writer.
- Kamla Srivastava, 90, Indian folk singer, cardio-respiratory failure.
- Gunnar Ström, 93, Swedish Olympic speed skater (1952, 1956).
- Tian Yunzhang, 78, Chinese calligrapher.
- Jan van Veen, 79, Dutch radio host and disc jockey.
- Peter Villano, 100, American politician, member of the Connecticut House of Representatives (1993–2013).
- Melvin Way, 70, American folk artist, complications from a stroke.
- Zhu Bofang, 95, Chinese engineer.

=== 5 ===
- Dries van Agt, 93, Dutch politician, diplomat and jurist, deputy prime minister (1973–1977), prime minister (1977–1982), euthanasia.
- Arthur P. Barnes, 93, American conductor.
- Toppen Bech, 84, Norwegian journalist (Aftenposten, Alle Kvinners Blad).
- Brigitte Bout, 83, French politician, senator (2002–2011) and mayor of Fleurbaix (2001–2008).
- Keshav Kumar Budhathoki, 80, Nepali politician, minister of defence (2016–2017) and MP (since 2008), prostate cancer.
- Brian Callison, 89, British novelist.
- Derek Crowther, 86, British oncologist.
- William Current, 89, American politician, member of the North Carolina House of Representatives (2005–2013)
- Jerry Daanen, 79, American football player (St. Louis Cardinals).
- José Delbo, 90, Argentine comic book artist (Wonder Woman, The Transformers, Batgirl).
- John Dossey, 79, American mathematician.
- Mickey Gilbert, 87, American stuntman (The Fall Guy, The Last of the Mohicans, The Blues Brothers).
- Francisco Gómez Camacho, 84, Spanish Jesuit priest.
- Riikka Hakola, 61, Finnish opera singer, brain tumour.
- Tsutomu Hanahara, 84, Japanese wrestler, Olympic champion (1964).
- Michael Jayston, 88, English actor (Only Fools and Horses, Doctor Who, Nicholas and Alexandra).
- Toby Keith, 62, American country singer ("Should've Been a Cowboy", "How Do You Like Me Now?!", "Red Solo Cup") and songwriter, stomach cancer.
- Peter Kulka, 86, German architect.
- Jean Malaurie, 101, French anthropologist and explorer.
- Laralyn McWilliams, 58, American video game designer (Free Realms, Over the Hedge, Full Spectrum Warrior), complications from heart surgery.
- Joan Montgomery, 98, Australian teacher.
- Namkoong Won, 89, South Korean actor (Eunuch, Woman of Fire, Assassin), lung cancer.
- Nora, 19, American cat.
- Bill Northey, 64, American politician, Iowa secretary of agriculture (2007–2018).
- Martha Brill Olcott, 74, American political scientist and academic.
- Ernie O'Rourke, 97, Australian footballer (Melbourne, North Melbourne).
- Chris Paling, 67–68, British radio producer (BBC Radio 4), artist and author.
- Helga Paris, 85, German photographer.
- José Peláez Bardales, 77, Peruvian lawyer and judge, attorney general (2011–2014).
- Brigitte A. Rollett, 89, Austrian psychologist.
- Charles Sallis, 89, American historian and writer.
- Horacio Sánchez Unzueta, 74, Mexican politician, lawyer and ambassador, governor of San Luis Potosí (1993–1997) and deputy (1991–1992).
- Vyacheslav Sokolov, 82, Russian politician, MP (1996–2000).
- Jimi Solanke, 81, Nigerian actor (Sango, Shadow Parties), poet, and playwright.
- Olijela del Valle Rivas, 97, Argentine politician, senator (1983–1998), deputy (1999–2003).
- Walter van den Broeck, 82, Belgian writer and playwright.

=== 6 ===
- Abd Mohd Khalid Mohd Ali, 66, Malaysian footballer (Selangor, Kuala Lumpur, national team), lung cancer.
- Vijay Anand, 71, Indian composer.
- Mohamed Bensaid Ait Idder, 98, Moroccan political activist.
- Rafiga Akhundova, 92, Azerbaijani ballerina.
- Hrant Ayvazyan, 54, Armenian politician, MP (since 2019), traffic collision.
- John Bruton, 76, Irish politician, Taoiseach (1994–1997), twice minister of finance, and TD (1969–2004).
- Paul Contillo, 94, American politician, member of the New Jersey General Assembly (1974–1980, 2013–2014) and Senate (1984–1992).
- Chuck Dickerson, 86, American football coach (Toronto Argonauts, Buffalo Bills).
- Jacques Duval, 89, Canadian journalist and racing driver.
- Joseph Chike Edozien, 98, Nigerian traditional ruler, king of Asaba (since 1990).
- Sir Anthony Epstein, 102, British pathologist (Epstein–Barr virus).
- John Evelyn, 84, British Olympic bobsledder.
- Shreela Flather, Baroness Flather, 89, British politician, teacher, and life peer, member of the House of Lords (since 1990).
- Ken Fritz, 66, American football player (Ohio State Buckeyes).
- Cecilia Gentili, 52, Argentine LGBTQ rights activist.
- Pablo Grant, 26, German actor (Polizeiruf 110) and rapper, thrombosis.
- Jack M. Guttentag, 100, American banker and academic.
- Gheorghe Iamandi, 66, Romanian football player (Olt Scornicești, Dinamo București) and manager (Delta Tulcea).
- Gijs IJlander, 76, Dutch writer.
- Donald Kinsey, 70, American guitarist and singer (The Kinsey Report, The Wailers Band, Peter Tosh).
- Mary MacKenzie, 93, American mezzo-soprano singer.
- John Mahler, 87, American race car driver.
- Petra Mathers, 78, German-born American author and illustrator, suicide.
- Don McKay, 86, New Zealand rugby union player (Auckland, national team).
- Robin McLeod, 72, Canadian surgeon.
- Miguel Ángel, 76, Spanish footballer (Real Madrid, Castellón, national team), complications from amyotrophic lateral sclerosis.
- Ivar Molde, 74, Norwegian politician, MP (1993–1997).
- Yoshitaka Murayama, 55, Japanese video game designer (Suikoden).
- Farooq Nazki, 83, Indian poet and broadcaster, director of Doordarshan (1986–1997), heart attack.
- Seiji Ozawa, 88, Japanese conductor, heart failure.
- K. Parasuraman, 63, Indian politician, MP (2014–2019).
- Sebastián Piñera, 74, Chilean politician and businessman, president (2010–2014, 2018–2022) and senator (1990–1998), helicopter crash.
- Andrew Graham Rice, 73, British advertising executive.
- Javier Salmerón, 57, Spanish athlete, double Paralympic silver medallist (1992).
- Rubab Sayda, 73, Indian politician, MP (2004–2009).
- Rod Sherman, 79, American football player (Oakland Raiders, Cincinnati Bengals, Denver Broncos).
- Jimmy Uguro, Papua New Guinean politician, MP (since 2017).
- Veena Verma, 82, Indian politician, MP (1986–2000).
- Sir Richard Vickers, 95, British Army lieutenant general.
- Jennifer Wolff, 64, Puerto Rican television reporter (WAPA-TV, WKAQ-TV), show host and writer, cancer.
- Robert M. Young, 99, American film director, screenwriter (Alambrista!, The Ballad of Gregorio Cortez) and producer (American Me).
- Stefan Jerzy Zweig, 83, Polish-born Austrian author and cameraman.

=== 7 ===
- Stanislas Spero Adotevi, 90, Beninese politician, UNICEF official and civil servant.
- Mustapha Ahmed, 63, Ghanaian politician, MP (2001–2013).
- Ryōko Akamatsu, 94, Japanese politician, minister of education (1993–1994).
- Bob Altemeyer, 83, Canadian psychologist.
- Luigi Arienti, 87, Italian cyclist, Olympic champion (1960).
- Vaja Azarashvili, 87, Georgian composer.
- Diana Carnero, 29, Ecuadorian politician, shot.
- Alfredo Castelli, 76, Italian comic book artist (Martin Mystère, Mister No).
- David Davies, 3rd Baron Davies, 83, British hereditary peer and engineer, member of the House of Lords (1944–1999).
- Eva Dobiášová, 90, Czech basketball player. (death announced on this date)
- Ethel Ekpe, 60, Nigerian actress (Basi and Company), cancer.
- Henry Fambrough, 85, American Hall of Fame singer (The Spinners).
- Anthony C. George, 86, Grenadian artist, designer of the flag of Grenada.
- Alfred Grosser, 99, German-born French political scientist.
- Carl Iwasaki, 62, American baseball coach (Austin Kangaroos, Northern Colorado Bears).
- Gylan Kain, 81–82, American poet and playwright.
- Claus Kreul, 79, German football player (Karl-Marx-Stadt, BSG Wismut Aue) and manager (Hansa Rostock).
- Ton van der Laaken, 71, Dutch korfball player, coach, and referee.
- Maria Fida Moro, 77, Italian politician, senator (1987–1992).
- Alejandro Muyshondt, 46, Salvadoran politician and security advisor, pulmonary edema.
- Hiroo Nakashima, 86, Japanese businessman and politician, member of the House of Councillors (1995–2007).
- Mojo Nixon, 66, American musician ("Debbie Gibson Is Pregnant with My Two-Headed Love Child") and actor (Super Mario Bros., Great Balls of Fire!).
- Shurron Pierson, 41, American football player (Oakland Raiders, Chicago Bears).
- Qristina Ribohn, 68, Swedish reality television contestant (The Farm, Club Goa, Baren).
- Ahmed Rubel, 55, Bangladeshi actor (Meghla Akash, Shyamol Chhaya, Chironjeeb Mujib).
- Vladyslav Rykov, 30, Ukrainian military pilot.
- Abu Baqir Al-Saadi, 49–50, Syrian Hezbollah military leader, drone strike.
- Judit Selymes, 83, Hungarian-born American theatre director and author.
- Abror Tursunov, Uzbek actor (Suyunchi, Abdullajon).

=== 8 ===
- Isaac Aja, 87, Spanish politician, president of the Provisional Assembly of Cantabria (1982–1983), senator (1986–1987).
- Lauro Baja, 86, Filipino diplomat, heart attack.
- Virginia Beavert, 102, American Ichiskiin linguist.
- Nex Benedict, 16, American non-binary student, suicide by drug overdose.
- Patrick Boylan, 84, English geologist and museum director.
- Andy Brandi, 72, Puerto Rican college tennis coach (Florida Gators, LSU Tigers).
- Murray Brown, 57, South African cricket umpire.
- Osvaldo Cavagnaro, 85, Argentine Olympic rower.
- Claude Courchay, 90, French novelist.
- Andrew Crispo, 78, American art gallerist and convicted felon.
- Joe Dudley, 86, American businessman and hair care entrepreneur.
- Charlotte Froese Fischer, 94, Canadian-American applied mathematician and computer scientist.
- Raymond Gillespie, 68, Irish historian.
- Howard Hawking, 90, Australian footballer (Geelong).
- Karl Horst Hödicke, 85, German painter.
- William Isangura, 71, Tanzanian Olympic boxer (1980, 1984).
- Toddy Kehoe, 105, Canadian politician.
- Daryl Kramp, 76, Canadian politician, MP (2004–2015) and Ontario MPP (2018–2022).
- Mohd Azraai Khor Abdullah, 71, Malaysian football player (Kedah, national team) and coach (Negeri Sembilan), stroke.
- André Nicolet, 73, Swiss Olympic sailor (1976).
- Nancy Ostrander, 98, American diplomat, ambassador to Suriname (1978–1980).
- João Oliveira Pinto, 52, Portuguese footballer (Estoril, Gil Vicente, Imortal), leukaemia.
- Willem van Schendel, 73, Dutch jurist, justice (2001–2012) and vice president (2012–2020) of the Supreme Court.
- Erich Schneider, 90, German politician, president of the Landtag of Baden-Württemberg (1984–1992).
- Gurdev Singh, 90, Indian field hockey player, Olympic champion (1956).
- Guy Van Sam, 88, French footballer (Montpellier, RC Paris, SC Toulon).
- Vũ Quang Bảo, 69, Vietnamese football player and manager, heart attack.

=== 9 ===
- Abdelali Abdelmoula, 75, Moroccan businessman and politician, deputy (2011–2016).
- Robert Badinter, 95, French lawyer and politician, minister of justice (1981–1986), senator (1995–2011) and president of the Constitutional Council (1986–1995).
- Daniel A. Baugh, 92, American historian.
- William M. Beecher, 90, American journalist and author.
- B. Clark Burchfiel, 89, American structural geologist.
- Martin Černohorský, 100, Czech physicist and academic.
- Abdul Momin Chowdhury, 84, Bangladeshi historian and academic administrator, vice chancellor of the National University (2001–2003) and PaU (2003–2005), president of the ASB (2000–2003).
- Norman Cooley, 83, English cricketer and footballer (Bedford Town).
- Sir John Day, 76, British Royal Air Force officer, brain cancer.
- Fleur van Dooren, 35, Dutch field hockey player (Rotterdam, Pinoké, national team), euthanasia.
- Jenny Estrada, 83, Ecuadorian journalist, writer and historian.
- Robert Evans, 63, Australian footballer (Coburg, Subiaco), cancer.
- Renata Flores, 74, Mexican actress (Rosa salvaje, La usurpadora, Amores verdaderos) and rock singer, cancer.
- Mataʻiʻulua ʻi Fonuamotu, Tongan noble and politician, MP (2014–2021). (death announced on this date)
- Juan Fortuny, 77, Spanish Olympic swimmer (1964, 1968).
- Nikša Gligo, 77, Croatian musicologist.
- Leonidas Grigorakos, 70, Greek doctor and politician, MP (2000–2019).
- Roland Grip, 83, Swedish footballer (AIK, IK Sirius, national team).
- Peter Handyside, 49, Scottish footballer (Grimsby Town, Stoke City, Barnsley).
- Jim Hannan, 84, American baseball player (Washington Senators) and executive, founder, president, and chairman of the board for the MLBPAA.
- Eva Harr, 72, Norwegian visual artist, cancer.
- Frank Howson, 71, Australian theatre and film director, screenwriter, and singer.
- Magdolna Komka, 74, Hungarian Olympic high jumper (1968, 1972).
- Pentti Koskela, 78, Finnish Olympic ice hockey player (1968).
- Gerry McDougall, 88, American football player (Hamilton Tiger-Cats, San Diego Chargers, Toronto Argonauts).
- Marie-Cécile Morice, 75, French politician.
- Vincent Mosco, 75, American-Canadian sociologist and political economist.
- Bruce Newman, 94, American antique dealer.
- Abimbola Ogunbanjo, 61, Nigerian businessman, helicopter crash.
- Antonio Rački, 50, Croatian Olympic cross-country skier (1994, 1998), traffic collision.
- Ali Akbar Sarfaraz, 96, Iranian archaeologist.
- Paul Schultz, 84, New Zealand rugby league footballer (national team).
- Ivan Sergeyev, 82, Russian diplomat.
- Lenny Simpson, 75, American tennis player.
- George Strake Jr., 88, American politician, Texas secretary of state (1979–1981).
- Sher Bahadur Subedi, 66, Indian politician, Sikkim MLA (2014–2019), cancer.
- Damo Suzuki, 74, Japanese singer (Can) and songwriter ("Vitamin C", "Spoon"), colon cancer.
- Iraj Tanzifi, 85, Iranian sculptor and painter, heart disease.
- Ed Tarver, 64, American lawyer and politician, member of the Georgia State Senate (2005–2009), U.S. attorney for the Southern District of Georgia (2009–2017), complications from surgery.
- Jimmy Van Eaton, 86, American rock drummer, singer and record producer.
- Hans J. Van Miegroet, Belgian-American art historian and educator, traffic collision.
- Herbert Wigwe, 57, Nigerian banker, helicopter crash.
- Klaus Zink, 88, German footballer (BSG Wismut Plauen, Wismut Karl-Marx-Stadt).

=== 10 ===
- Jones Arogbofa, 71, Nigerian military officer, chief of staff to the president (2014–2015).
- Thomas W. Bennett, 87, American politician, member of the Georgia House of Representatives (1971–1972).
- Henry Blackaby, 88, Canadian evangelical pastor.
- Günter Brus, 85, Austrian painter, performance and graphic artist, and writer.
- Chen Chun-han, 40, Taiwanese lawyer and disability rights advocate, lung infection.
- V. Sugnana Kumari Deo, 86, Indian politician, Odisha MLA (1963–2014).
- Nicholas Dimbleby, 77, British sculptor, complications from motor neuron disease.
- Yoram Dinstein, 88, Israeli scholar.
- Bob Edwards, 76, American journalist (NPR) and radio host (Morning Edition, The Bob Edwards Show), Peabody Award winner (1999), bladder cancer and heart ailment.
- Gerald Hensley, 88, New Zealand public servant and diplomat.
- Jack Higgins, 69, American editorial cartoonist, Pulitzer Prize winner (1989).
- Athol Jennings, 93, South African Olympic runner (1952).
- Mohammad Khdour, 17, Palestinian-American child, shot.
- Johanna von Koczian, 90, German actress (Victor and Victoria, The Marriage of Mr. Mississippi, Our House in Cameroon).
- Gunild Lattmann-Kretschmer, 87, German intendant and politician, member of the Landtag of Saxony (1994–2004).
- Ian Lawson, 84, English footballer (Leeds United, Burnley, Crystal Palace). (death announced on this date)
- Ingeborg Levin, 70, German geoscientist.
- Edward Lowassa, 70, Tanzanian politician, prime minister (2005–2008) and MP (1995–2015).
- Chris Markoff, 85, Yugoslav-born American professional wrestler.
- Paul Martinez, 76, English musician and songwriter.
- Jimmy McDonald, 91, Scottish footballer (Greenock Morton).
- Harold Mitchell, 81, Australian entrepreneur, media buyer and philanthropist.
- Bob Moore, 94, American food executive, founder of Bob's Red Mill.
- Askar Mussinov, 62, Kazakh diplomat.
- Paul Neary, 74, British comic book artist (2000 AD, Ultimates).
- Sharon Nordgren, 80, American politician, member of the New Hampshire House of Representatives (since 1988).
- Shane O'Hanlon, Irish Gaelic football player (St Vincents) and coach (Dublin).
- Karin Palme, 46, Mexican tennis player, heart attack.
- Herman Parish, 71, American author (Amelia Bedelia).
- William Post, 96, American inventor (Pop-Tarts).
- A. Ramachandran, 89, Indian painter.
- David C. Rapoport, 96, American academician.
- Neil Rhind, 87, English journalist and writer.
- Claire Seymour, 53, English educator and violinist.
- Ugyen Tshering, 69, Bhutanese politician, minister of foreign affairs (2008–2013). (death announced on this date)
- E. Duke Vincent, 91, American television producer (Dynasty, Beverly Hills, 90210, Charlie's Angels).
- Onzlee Ware, 70, American politician and judge, member of the Virginia House of Delegates (2004–2014).
- Jodi White, 77, Canadian political operative, chief of staff to the prime minister (1993), breast cancer.

=== 11 ===
- Shartai Jaafar Abdel Hakam, Sudanese politician.
- Mark Anthony Awuni, 83, Ghanaian politician.
- Allen J. Bard, 90, American electrochemist.
- Vallabh Benke, 74, Indian politician, Maharashtra MLA (1985–1995, 2004–2014).
- Ladislav Burlas, 96, Slovak composer and musicologist.
- Doris Carver, 77, American computer scientist.
- Angela Chao, 50, American businesswoman.
- Choi Un-ji, 97, South Korean businessman and politician, MP (1985–1996).
- Delano Christopher, 73, Antiguan police officer, commissioner of the Royal Police Force (2005–2008).
- Willibrord Davids, 85, Dutch jurist, president of the Supreme Court (2004–2008).
- Elisabeth Djouka, Cameroonian nationalist militant.
- Maxine Drinkwater, 87, American baseball player (South Bend Blue Sox).
- Füruzan, 91, Turkish writer.
- Gervais Hakizimana, 36, Rwandan track and field athlete and coach, traffic collision.
- Yılmaz Karakoyunlu, 87, Turkish writer and politician, minister of state (2001–2002) and MP (2001–2002).
- Usha Kiran Khan, 78, Indian writer.
- Kelvin Kiptum, 24, Kenyan long-distance runner, marathon world record holder, traffic collision.
- Peter Leigh, 84, English footballer (Crewe Alexandra, Manchester City).
- Bill Luxton, 83, Falkland Islands politician, member of the legislative council (1989–2001) and legislative assembly (2009–2011).
- Giuseppe Matulli, 85, Italian politician, deputy (1987–1994).
- Isabel Mijares, 81, Spanish oenologist, heart attack.
- Peter Naumann, 82, German sailor, Olympic silver medallist (1968).
- Nerio Nesi, 98, Italian banker and politician, deputy (1996–2006) and minister of public works (2000–2001).
- István Orosz, 88, Hungarian politician, MP (1994–1998) and historian, president of the Hungarian Historical Society (2007–2015).
- Brigitte de Prémont, 88, French politician, deputy (1995–1997).
- Eberhard Probst, 68, German Olympic wrestler (1976, 1980).
- Thomas C. Reed, 89, American politician, secretary of the air force (1976–1977).
- Arthur Robinson, 77, English cricketer (Yorkshire).
- Bernard Schmied, 90, Swiss Olympic basketball player (1952).
- Randy Sparks, 90, American musician (The New Christy Minstrels, The Back Porch Majority) and songwriter ("Green, Green").
- Charles Stendig, 99, American businessman and philanthropist.
- Margrethe Tennfjord, 88, Norwegian politician, mayor of Haram Municipality (1991–1999) and MP (1977–1989).
- Miguel Valor Peidró, 79, Spanish politician, mayor of Alicante (2015) and member of Corts Valencianes (1991–1995).
- Chris Wardlow, 81, English rugby union player (Carlisle, national team), complications from Alzheimer's disease.
- Gregor Wenning, 59, German neurologist.

=== 12 ===
- Chaudhry Muhammad Adnan, 47, Pakistani politician, Punjab MPA (2018–2023), shot.
- Paul-Siméon Ahouanan Djro, 71, Ivorian Roman Catholic prelate, bishop of Yamoussoukro (1996–2006) and archbishop of Bouaké (since 2006).
- Mihai Amihălăchioaie, 62, Moldovan accordionist and conductor, liver cancer.
- Henk J. M. Bos, 83, Dutch historian of mathematics.
- David Bouley, 70, American-French chef and restaurateur (Bouley), heart attack.
- Robert Chazan, 87, American historian.
- Gerald Davis, 88, American politician.
- Tamás Deák, 95, Hungarian composer and conductor.
- John Gower, 62, English rear admiral, bowel cancer.
- Mounir Hamoud, 39, Moroccan-born Norwegian footballer (Lyn, Bodø/Glimt, Strømsgodset).
- Jules Harlow, 92, American rabbi.
- Sidra Hassouna, 7, Palestinian girl, airstrike.
- Robert Huscher, 86, American Olympic bobsledder (1968).
- Ugo Intini, 82, Italian politician, deputy (1983–1994, 2001–2006).
- Rudolf Jansen, 84, Dutch classical pianist.
- Diodorus Kamala, 55, Tanzanian politician and diplomat, MP (2000–2010).
- Genshiro Kawamoto, 91, Japanese businessman.
- Petar Luković, 73, Serbian journalist (Vreme), newspaper editor and rock critic.
- Chuck Mawhinney, 74, American Marine Corps sniper.
- Sam Mercer, 69, American film producer (Unbreakable, Signs, The Village), complications from Alzheimer's disease.
- Alec Mills, 91, British cinematographer (King Kong Lives, The Living Daylights, Licence to Kill).
- Zdenko Morovic, 57, Yugoslav-born Venezuelan footballer (Deportivo Italia, national team).
- Stewart Robertson, 75, Scottish conductor.
- Karl-Werner Rüsch, 86, Austrian civil engineer and politician, member of the Landtag of Vorarlberg (1976–1984).
- Patty Sahota, 54, Canadian politician, British Columbia MLA (2001–2005).
- Aleksandr Seleznyov, 60, Russian hammer thrower.
- Rolf Selzer, 81, German journalist and politician, member of the Landtag of Schleswig-Holstein (1983–1996).
- Gary L. Sharpe, 77, American jurist, judge (since 2004) and chief judge (2011–2015) of the U.S. District Court for Northern New York.
- Karl Sigurbjörnsson, 77, Icelandic Evangelical Lutheran prelate, bishop of Iceland (1998–2012).
- Vincenzo Siniscalchi, 92, Italian lawyer and politician, deputy (1995–2006).
- Len Stirling, 86, Canadian politician, Newfoundland and Labrador MHA (1979–1982).
- Sukhjit, 62, Indian writer.
- Roy Wales, 83, British conductor.
- Steve Wright, 69, English disc jockey (BBC Radio 1, BBC Radio 2) and television presenter (Top of the Pops), ruptured ulcer.
- Hirotake Yano, 80, Japanese businessman, founder of Daiso.
- Anar Zhailganova, 54, Kazakh politician, MP (2016–2019).

=== 13 ===
- Arturo Aylwin, 96, Chilean lawyer, comptroller general of the republic (1997–2002).
- Aletta Bezuidenhout, 74, Kenyan-born South African actress (In My Country, Paljas).
- Eddie Cheeba, 67, American disc jockey.
- Ludwik Denderys, 79, Polish Olympic boxer (1972).
- Alain Dorval, 77, French voice actor (Sylvester Stallone, Nick Nolte, Pete), cancer.
- Séamus Flynn, 84, Irish Gaelic footballer (Clonguish, Longford).
- Norman C. Gaddis, 100, American brigadier general.
- Datta Gaekwad, 95, Indian cricketer (Baroda, national team).
- Guo Lianwen, 71, Chinese actor (Mao Zedong).
- Maureen Hicks, 75, British politician, MP (1987–1992).
- Frans van der Hoff, 84, Dutch missionary.
- Gerry James, 89, Canadian Hall of Fame football player (Winnipeg Blue Bombers, Saskatchewan Roughriders) and ice hockey player (Toronto Maple Leafs).
- Roy Johnson, 75, Bermudian Olympic boxer (1972).
- Abdul Aziz Junejo, 62, Pakistani politician, Sindh MPA (2016–2023).
- Cees Koch, 98, Dutch Olympic sprint canoeist (1948, 1952).
- Law Pak, 90, Hong Kong-Taiwanese football player (KMB, Chinese Taipei national team) and manager (Flying Camel).
- Sergio Mantegazza, 96, Swiss travel industry executive, president of Group Voyagers (since 1975).
- Mick Moon, 86, British artist.
- Ibrahim Saidi Rashidi Msabaha, 72, Tanzanian politician.
- Frank Nwachukwu Ndili, 89, Nigerian nuclear physicist.
- Marcel Nuss, 69, French essayist.
- Gabriela Pando, 53, Argentine Olympic field hockey player (1996), cancer.
- Dieter Pauly, 81, German football referee.
- Ferenc Pavlics, 96, Hungarian-born American mechanical engineer.
- Jean-François Pernin, 82, French journalist and politician, mayor of the 12th arrondissement of Paris (1995–2001), councillor of Paris (2001–2008).
- Ken Ploen, 88, American Hall of Fame football player (Winnipeg Blue Bombers).
- Jan Poignant, 82, Swedish Olympic sports shooter (1964).
- Jussi Raittinen, 80, Finnish musician.
- Kasha Rigby, 54, American competitive skier and pioneer of telemark skiing, avalanche.
- Mahjoub Mohamed Salih, 95, Sudanese journalist.
- James Sharpe, 77, English social historian.
- Jenny Staley Hoad, 89, Australian tennis player.
- Reidar Thomassen, 87, Norwegian writer.
- Twomad, 23, Canadian YouTuber and Twitch streamer, accidental morphine overdose.
- Robert Varnajo, 94, French road racing cyclist (Saint-Raphaël, Rapha–Gitane–Dunlop).
- Valery Vostrotin, 71, Russian colonel general and politician, deputy (2003–2011).
- Henk van Vught, 77, Dutch cyclist.
- Muhammad al-Zawahiri, 71, Egyptian Islamic militant.

=== 14 ===
- Ian Amey, 79, English musician and singer (Dave Dee, Dozy, Beaky, Mick & Tich).
- Peter Armitage, 99, English medical statistician.
- Annick Balley, 59–60, Beninese journalist (ORTB) and television presenter.
- Stephen Biesty, 63, British illustrator.
- Diego Chávez, 28, Mexican footballer (Veracruz, Mannucci), traffic collision.
- Lucette Desvignes, 97, French writer.
- Arlene Donovan, 96, American film producer (Places in the Heart, Nobody's Fool, Twilight).
- Nancy González, 71, Venezuelan actress (María María, La mujer prohibida, Bellísima).
- Don Gullett, 73, American baseball player (Cincinnati Reds, New York Yankees), stroke.
- Muhammad Salih Haydara, 71–72, Yemeni journalist and writer, traffic collision.
- Ervín Hoida, 105, Czechoslovak-born British World War II veteran.
- Dani Koren, 78, Israeli politician, member of Knesset (2006).
- Nivaldo Passos Krüger, 94, Brazilian politician, member of the Legislative Assembly of Paraná (1970–1972), deputy (1979–1982), senator (2002–2003).
- José Lladó, 89, Spanish politician and businessman, minister of trade (1976–1977) and transport and communications (1977–1978), ambassador to the US (1978–1982).
- Sasha Montenegro, 78, Mexican actress (Rina, Una mujer marcada, Las vías del amor).
- Folake Onayemi, 59, Nigerian literary scholar.
- John Onoje, 64, Sierra Leonean-born Moldovan political activist.
- Gabriel Olutola, 90, Nigerian author and pastor, president of The Apostolic Church Nigeria (2011–2017).
- Ventura Pérez Mariño, 75, Spanish judge and politician, deputy (1993–1995) and mayor of Vigo (2003).
- Lena Prewitt, 92, American academic.
- Jacques Rousseau, 72, French Olympic long jumper (1972, 1976).
- Khaled Sheikh, Yemeni diplomat and politician.
- Tan Kue Kim, 78, Singaporean chef and restaurateur, heart attack.
- Anatoly Vershik, 90, Russian mathematician (Bratteli-Vershik diagram).
- Muru Walters, 89, New Zealand rugby union player (North Auckland, New Zealand Māori) and Māori Anglican bishop, Pīhopa o Te Upoko o Te Ika (1992–2018).
- Wolfgang Weider, 91, German Roman Catholic prelate, auxiliary bishop of Berlin (1982–2009).
- Dan Wilcox, 82, American screenwriter and producer (Sesame Street, M*A*S*H, America 2-Night).

=== 15 ===
- Georgine Anderson, 96, British actress (Persuasion, The Woman in White, Coronation Street).
- Enrique Badía Romero, 93, Spanish cartoonist (Modesty Blaise, AXA).
- Gérard Barray, 92, French actor (Shéhérazade, Open Your Eyes, Captain Fracasse).
- Nicolas Bergeron, 48, French academic and mathematician.
- Allen Bergin, 89, American clinical psychologist.
- Guy Brousseau, 91, French mathematics educationalist.
- Camila Cañeque, 39, Spanish conceptual and performance artist.
- Kavita Chaudhary, 67, Indian actress, television director and producer (Udaan, Your Honour, IPS Diaries), heart attack.
- Hernán Hipólito Cornejo, 78, Argentine diplomat and politician, governor of Salta (1987–1991).
- Yasmine Gooneratne, 88, Sri Lankan writer.
- David Holladay, 70, American computer programmer.
- Shafiqah Hudson, 46, American feminism activist.
- Jai Kumar Jalaj, 89, Indian writer.
- Derek W. Jones, 90, British-born Canadian academic.
- Kagney Linn Karter, 36, American pornographic film actress, suicide by gunshot.
- Fulton Kuykendall, 70, American football player (Atlanta Falcons, San Francisco 49ers), complications from dementia.
- Pedro Lamas Baliero, 82, Uruguayan chess player. (death announced on this date)
- María Carmen Mas Rubio, 69, Spanish politician, member of the Corts Valencianes (1996–2000).
- James R. McCarthy, 93, American brigadier general.
- Roeland Nolte, 79, Dutch chemist.
- Stuart Organ, 72, British actor (Grange Hill, Brookside, The Legend of Snow White).
- Luce Pietri, 92, French historian.
- Tom Qualters, 88, American baseball player (Philadelphia Phillies, Chicago White Sox).
- Henry Rono, 72, Kenyan long-distance runner.
- Arnfinn Johs. Stein, 93, Norwegian politician, deputy MP (1977–1985).
- D. Venugopal, 92, Indian politician, MP (1996–2014) and Tamil Nadu MLA (1977–1984).
- Nancy Wallace, 93, American environmentalist.
- Anne Whitfield, 85, American actress (White Christmas, Juvenile Jungle, Rawhide).
- Steven M. Wise, 73, American author and legal scholar.
- Allan Yeomans, 92, Australian farmer, author and inventor.

=== 16 ===
- Idris Ali, 73, Indian politician, MP (2014–2019) and West Bengal MLA (since 2019).
- Raj Bisaria, 88, Indian theatre actor and director, throat cancer.
- Ottar Brox, 91, Norwegian sociologist and politician, MP (1973–1977).
- Vasco Cantarello, 87, Italian Olympic rower (1960).
- J. Aidan Carney, 90, Irish-born American pathologist, heart failure.
- Alain Cribier, 79, French cardiologist, performed first transcatheter aortic valve replacement.
- Etterlene DeBarge, 88, American singer.
- Rees Duncan, 92, Australian rugby league footballer (Manly Warringah, Western Suburbs, national team).
- Zbigniew Fedyczak, 71, Polish Olympic sports shooter (1972).
- Charles D. Ferris, 90, American lawyer and government official, chairman of the Federal Communications Commission (1977–1981).
- Pa Finn, 87, Irish hurler (St Finbarr's).
- Peter Firth, 94, English Anglican clergyman, bishop of Malmesbury (1983–1994).
- José Gotovitch, 83, Belgian historian.
- Hank Hancock, 87, American politician, member of the Kentucky House of Representatives (1974–1995).
- Joe Hindelang, 78, American college baseball coach (USciences Devils, Lafayette Leopards, Penn State Nittany Lions).
- Reijo Höykinpuro, 90, Finnish Olympic long-distance runner (1960).
- Reuben Jackson, 67, American poet and jazz historian, stroke.
- Kendrick Bangs Kellogg, 89, American architect.
- Aleš Lamr, 80, Czech painter, sculptor, and ceramist.
- Ben Lanzarone, 85, American composer (The Love Boat), lung cancer.
- Ileen Maisel, 68, American film producer (The Golden Compass, Inkheart, Birth).
- Giorgio Malentacchi, 89, Italian politician, deputy (1996–2001) and senator (2001–2002).
- Dmitry Markov, 41, Russian documentary photographer and journalist (Argumenty i Fakty).
- Ian McMillan, 92, Scottish footballer (Airdrieonians, Rangers, national team).
- Alexei Navalny, 47, Russian lawyer, opposition politician and political prisoner.
- Imtiaz Qureshi, 93, Indian chef.
- Dexter Romweber, 57, American musician (Flat Duo Jets).
- Mayra Rosales, 43, American former heaviest living woman.
- Jan Sørensen, 68, Danish football player (Club Brugge, Twente) and manager (Walsall).
- Jorge Toro, 85, Chilean footballer (Modena, Colo-Colo, national team).
- Hryhoriy Varzhelenko, 73, Ukrainian football player (Kolos Nikopol) and manager (Polissia Zhytomyr).
- Welcome W. Wilson Sr., 95, American real estate executive.
- Bing Worthington, 44, American businessman.

=== 17 ===
- Anjana Bhowmick, 79, Indian actress (Dibratrir Kabya, Kokhono Megh, Nayika Sangbad).
- Mary Bartlett Bunge, 92, American neuroscientist.
- John B. Conway, 84, American mathematician.
- Lefty Driesell, 92, American Hall of Fame college basketball coach (Davidson Wildcats, Maryland Terrapins, James Madison Dukes).
- Bill Francis, 76, British rugby league player (Wigan, St Helens, Great Britain).
- Johan Galtung, 93, Norwegian sociologist, founder of the Journal of Peace Research, founder director of the Peace Research Institute Oslo (1959–1969).
- Basil Gunasekara, 94, Sri Lankan military officer, Commander of the Navy (1973–1979).
- Geoffrey Michaels, 79, Australian violinist and violist, complications from Parkinson's disease.
- Eddie Mitchell, 69, English football club owner (AFC Bournemouth).
- Josette Molland, 100, French Resistance member and painter.
- Peter Michael Muhich, 62, American Roman Catholic prelate, bishop of Rapid City (since 2020), cancer.
- Jaap Oudkerk, 86, Dutch Olympic cyclist, bronze medalist (1964).
- Marc Pachter, 80, American museum director (National Portrait Gallery, National Museum of American History), heart attack.
- Gamini Jayawickrama Perera, 83, Sri Lankan politician, MP (1977–1989, 1994–2020) and minister of Buddha Sasana (2017–2019).
- Gerhard Poppendiecker, 86, German politician, member of the Landtag of Schleswig-Holstein (1987–2005).
- Mike Procter, 77, South African cricketer (Gloucestershire, Natal, Rhodesia).
- Gordon Redding, 86, British academic.
- Lidia Szczerbińska, 89, Polish gymnast, Olympic bronze medallist (1956).
- Levan Tediashvili, 75, Georgian wrestler, Olympic champion (1972, 1976).
- Allen Trammell, 81, American football player (Houston Oilers).
- Juan Uriarte, 90, Spanish Roman Catholic prelate, bishop of Zamora (1991–2000) and San Sebastián (2000–2009), stroke.
- Heinrich Ursprung, 91, Swiss biologist and academic.
- Alan Wilson, 68, British Anglican prelate, bishop of Buckingham (since 2003).

=== 18 ===
- María Eugenia Aubet, 80, Spanish archaeologist and historian.
- Bernard Aubouy, 84, French sound engineer and film director (Le Père Noël a les yeux bleus, The Tall Blond Man with One Black Shoe, I Don't Know Much, But I'll Say Everything).
- Steinar Bastesen, 78, Norwegian whaler and politician, MP (1997–2005).
- Clayton W. Bates, 91, American physicist.
- Jacques Bernard, 94, French actor (Les Enfants terribles, Quintuplets in the Boarding School, Love and the Frenchwoman).
- Jack Biddle, 94, American politician, member of the Alabama House of Representatives (1974–1994) and Senate (1994–2006).
- Linda Mitchell Davis, 93, American rancher.
- Roger Dicken, 84, British visual effects artist (Alien, When Dinosaurs Ruled the Earth, Witchfinder General).
- Abilio Diniz, 87, Brazilian retailer, chairman of BRF (since 2013), respiratory failure.
- Echo Zulu, 4, American Thoroughbred racehorse, euthanized.
- Lanny Flaherty, 81, American actor (Miller's Crossing, Signs, Men in Black 3), complications from surgery.
- Ira von Fürstenberg, 83, Italian socialite and actress (Five Dolls for an August Moon, The Vatican Affair, The Battle of El Alamein).
- Tony Ganios, 64, American actor (Porky's, The Wanderers, Die Hard 2), heart failure following surgery.
- Fernando González Delgado, 77, Spanish writer and journalist, Premio Azorín winner (2015).
- Michael Grunstein, 77, Romanian-born American biologist and academic.
- William Hardin Harrison, 90, American lieutenant general.
- Davlatmand Kholov, 73, Tajik musician, cancer.
- Kim Myung-hyuk, 86, South Korean Presbyterian pastor and academic, president of Hapdong Theological Seminary (1989–1993), traffic collision.
- Zbigniew Kupczynski, 95, Polish-Canadian painter.
- Lennart Levi, 93, Swedish politician, MP (2006–2010).
- Peggy Maxie, 87, American politician, member of the Washington House of Representatives (1971–1983).
- Mark Moran, 59, English rugby league footballer (Salford Red Devils).
- Hasina Mumtaz, 78, Bangladeshi singer.
- Michael O'Regan, 70, Irish journalist (The Irish Times).
- Emile Shoufani, 76, Israeli Melkite Greek Catholic archimandrite, educator and activist.
- Sidharthan, 20, Indian student, suicide.
- Lorns Skjemstad, 83, Norwegian Olympic cross-country skier (1968).
- Cornelio Sommaruga, 91, Swiss humanitarian, lawyer, and diplomat, president of the International Committee of the Red Cross (1987–1999).
- Garry Tee, 91, New Zealand mathematician and computer scientist.
- Verry Elleegant, 8, Australian racehorse, complications from foaling.
- Acharya Vidyasagar, 77, Indian Jain leader and poet, sallekhana.
- Steven Ward, 65, English cricketer (Durham).
- Bobbie Wygant, 97, American television journalist (KXAS-TV).

=== 19 ===
- Tikoy Aguiluz, 71, Filipino film director (Dead Sure, Rizal sa Dapitan, Manila Kingpin: The Asiong Salonga Story).
- Jirka Arndt, 50, German Olympic long-distance runner (2000).
- Jan Assmann, 85, German Egyptologist.
- Jesse Baird, 26, Australian television presenter (Totally Wild, Studio 10) and AFL umpire, shot.
- Roland Bertin, 93, French actor (Charlotte for Ever, West Indies, Diva).
- Virgilijus Vladislovas Bulovas, 84, Lithuanian engineer and politician, minister of the interior (1996, 2003–2004).
- Paul D'Amato, 75, American actor (Slap Shot, The Deer Hunter, Firepower), progressive supranuclear palsy.
- Raffaele Delfino, 92, Italian politician, deputy (1958–1979).
- Ramona Edelin, 78, American academic, activist, and consultant, cancer.
- Antonio Gallego, 81, Spanish writer and musicologist.
- Johnson Gwaikolo, 68, Liberian politician, member of the House of Representatives (2018-2024).
- Marion Halligan, 83, Australian novelist (Lovers' Knots).
- Peter Jarolin, 52, Austrian music and drama critic. (death announced on this date)
- John Lundgren, 83, Danish Olympic cyclist (1960).
- Ewen MacIntosh, 50, Welsh actor (The Office, Finding Fatimah, The Bromley Boys) and comedian.
- John Moran, 75, Australian rugby footballer (Penrith, Parramatta).
- Rabeya Müller, 67, German Islamic scholar.
- Horst Naumann, 98, German actor (The Black Forest Clinic, The Doctor of St. Pauli, U 47 – Kapitänleutnant Prien).
- Rodrigo Pardo García-Peña, 65, Colombian politician, minister of foreign affairs (1994–1996).
- Robert Reid, 68, American basketball player (Houston Rockets, Charlotte Hornets, Portland Trail Blazers) and coach, cancer.
- J. Beverley Smith, 92, Welsh medieval historian.
- Matt Sweeney, 75, American special effects artist (Apollo 13, The Goonies, The Fast and the Furious), lung cancer.
- Bobby Tench, 79, British musician (The Jeff Beck Group, Hummingbird, Streetwalkers).
- Manuel Ugarte Soto, 83, Chilean police officer and lawyer, general director of Carabineros (1997–2001).
- Carlos Manuel Urzúa Macías, 68, Mexican economist, secretary of finance and public credit (2018–2019).
- Robin Windsor, 44, British dancer (Strictly Come Dancing), suicide.

=== 20 ===
- René Arredondo, 79, Mexican Olympic judoka.
- Erik Bergkvist, 58, Swedish politician, MEP (since 2019), lung cancer.
- Andreas Brehme, 63, German football player (1. FC Kaiserslautern, Inter Milan, national team) and manager, world champion (1990).
- Hydeia Broadbent, 39, American HIV/AIDS activist.
- Ron Cameron, 79, American sportscaster.
- Kent Campbell, 80, American physician.
- Audrii Cunningham, 11, American child, blunt head trauma. (body discovered on this date)
- Thanaa Debsi, 82, Syrian actress (The Dupes).
- Larry Demery, 70, American baseball player (Pittsburgh Pirates).
- Vasile Dîba, 69, Romanian sprint canoeist, Olympic champion (1976).
- Martin Hole, 64, Norwegian Olympic cross-country skier (1988), cancer.
- Anfinn Kallsberg, 76, Faroese politician, prime minister (1998–2004).
- Bedřiška Kulhavá, 92, Czechoslovak Olympic middle-distance runner (1960).
- Ihar Lednik, 64, Belarusian political prisoner. (death announced on this date)
- David Libert, 81, American music executive, musician (The Happenings) and author.
- Jim Maddox, 85, American politician.
- Vladimir Makeranets, 76, Russian film director (The Golden Snake, You Exist...) and cinematographer (Semyon Dezhnev).
- Steve Miller, 73, American science fiction author (Liaden universe).
- Olga Murray, 99, Romanian-born American lawyer, founder of the Nepal Youth Foundation.
- Lucia Palugyayová, 46, Slovak television presenter, stroke.
- Steve Paxton, 85, American experimental dancer and choreographer.
- Roberto Pérez, 63, Bolivian footballer (Real Santa Cruz, Oriente Petrolero, national team).
- Ameen Sayani, 91, Indian radio announcer, heart attack.
- Teresa Selma, 93, Venezuelan actress (Ladrón de corazones).
- Rituraj Singh, 59, Indian actor (Banegi Apni Baat, Jyoti, Hitler Didi), heart attack.
- Eddie Sinnott, 69, American swimmer and coach.
- Charles Swini, 38, Malawian footballer (ESCOM United, Civo United, national team), kidney problems.
- Yoko Yamamoto, 81, Japanese actress (Red Handkerchief, Gappa: The Triphibian Monster, Hissatsu!5 Ōgon no Chi).
- Zhu Qihe, 99, Chinese chemist.

=== 21 ===
- Abdul Taib Mahmud, 87, Malaysian politician, Yang di-Pertua Negeri (2014–2024) and chief minister (1981–2014) of Sarawak.
- Jeroni Albertí, 96, Spanish politician, president of the Inter-island General Council (1977–1982), senator (1977–1982), and president of the Parliament of the Balearic Islands (1987–1991).
- Jayo Archer, 28, Australian motocross rider (Nitro Circus), training crash.
- John Bahnsen, 89, American brigadier general.
- Mike Cherry, 81, American politician, member of the Kentucky House of Representatives (1998–2013).
- Altuğ Çinici, 89, Turkish architect.
- Efeso Collins, 49, New Zealand politician, MP (since 2023).
- Robert D. Fulton, 94, American politician, governor (1969) and lieutenant governor (1965–1969) of Iowa.
- Murray Gerstenhaber, 96, American mathematician (Gerstenhaber algebra).
- Getachew Kassa, 79, Ethiopian singer and percussionist.
- Dave Gray, 63, Scottish broadcaster (BBC Radio Orkney).
- Roger Guillemin, 100, French-American neuroscientist, Nobel Prize laureate (1977).
- James R. Ketchum, 84, American art conservator, curator of the White House (1963–1970) and the senate (1970–1995).
- Stepan Khmara, 86, Ukrainian politician and political dissident, MP (1990–1998, 2002–2006).
- Kim Young-il, 83, South Korean lawyer and judge, justice of the Constitutional Court (1999–2005).
- Thomas Knauff, 85, American writer and glider pilot.
- George Kramer, 94, American chess player.
- Kent Kramer, 79, American football player (Philadelphia Eagles, Minnesota Vikings, New Orleans Saints).
- Vitalij Kuprij, 49, Ukrainian-American musician (Trans-Siberian Orchestra, Ring of Fire) and composer.
- Frank Lombardo, 65, American politician, member of the Rhode Island Senate (since 2011), bladder cancer.
- Keith Martin, 89, British radio DJ (Radio Caroline) and television presenter, cancer.
- Ed Mell, 81-82, American painter.
- Andrey Morozov, 44, Russian war correspondent and milblogger, suicide by gunshot.
- Nazir Naji, 81, Pakistani journalist (Daily Jang).
- Fali Sam Nariman, 95, Indian jurist, additional solicitor general (1972–1975), senior advocate of the Supreme Court (since 1971).
- Affonso Celso Pastore, 84, Brazilian economist, president of the Central Bank (1983–1985).
- Micheline Presle, 101, French actress (Adventures of Captain Fabian, Blind Date, The Bride Is Much Too Beautiful).
- Pamela Salem, 80, British actress (Never Say Never Again, EastEnders, Into the Labyrinth).
- John Savident, 86, British actor (Coronation Street, A Clockwork Orange, The Phantom of the Opera).
- Charlie Strutton, 34, English footballer (Chalfont St Peter, AFC Wimbledon, Slough Town).
- Movlud Suleymanli, 80, Azerbaijani dramatist, screenwriter and film adviser.
- Hisao Takahashi, 87, Japanese painter.
- Charles Taylor, 70, English Anglican priest, dean of Peterborough (2007–2016).
- Maria Venturi, 90, Italian writer and journalist.

=== 22 ===
- Liudmyla Alfimova, 88, Ukrainian actress (Wedding in Malinovka).
- Iona Campbell, Duchess of Argyll, 78, Scottish noblewoman.
- Robert Booker, 88, American politician and activist, member of the Tennessee House of Representatives (1967–1972).
- Harry Bowser, 92, American politician, member of the Pennsylvania House of Representatives (1979–1988).
- Paul Bradshaw, 67, English footballer (Blackburn Rovers, Wolverhampton Wanderers, Peterborough United). (death announced on this date)
- Edith Ceccarelli, 116, American supercentenarian.
- Robert Ellison, 82, Irish Roman Catholic prelate, bishop of Banjul (2006–2017).
- Artur Jorge, 78, Portuguese football player (Benfica, national team) and manager (Porto).
- Alois Kothgasser, 86, Austrian Roman Catholic prelate, bishop of Innsbruck (1997–2002) and Primas Germaniae and archbishop of Salzburg (2003–2013).
- Mikalai Labko, 75, Belarusian engineer and politician, member of the Supreme Council (1990–1996).
- John Lowe, 81, English pianist (The Quarrymen).
- Harry Melrose, 88, Scottish football player (Dunfermline Athletic, Aberdeen, Berwick Rangers) and manager.
- Kent Melton, 68, American animation sculptor (The Lion King, The Incredibles, Aladdin), Lewy body dementia.
- John David Miles, 76, American politician, member of the Georgia House of Representatives (1981–1983).
- Wendy Mitchell, 68, English dementia awareness activist.
- Pentti Pesonen, 85, Finnish cross-country skier.
- Laken Riley, 22, American nursing student, blunt force trauma.
- José María Rioboo, 75, Spanish academic and politician, deputy (1986–1989).
- Paramjit Singh, 72, Indian Olympic basketball player (1980).
- Viktoria Siradze, 94, Georgian politician, deputy of the Supreme Soviet (1955–1962, 1967–1989).
- Jerome Skolnick, 92, American criminologist.
- Richard Stolarski, 82, American atmospheric scientist.
- Roni Stoneman, 85, American Hall of Fame bluegrass banjo player and comedian (Hee Haw).
- Jean-Guy Talbot, 91, Canadian ice hockey player (Montreal Canadiens, St. Louis Blues, Buffalo Sabres) and coach, seven-time Stanley Cup champion.
- Wes Whitead, 90, American politician, member of the Iowa House of Representatives (1997–2001, 2003–2011).

=== 23 ===
- Peter Angritt, 85, American colonel.
- Colin Bennett, 80, English actor (Take Hart, Hartbeat, The Hitchhiker's Guide to the Galaxy).
- Drucilla Roberts Bickford, 98, American politician, member of the New Hampshire House of Representatives (1980–1982, 1988–1992).
- Brigitte Birnbaum, 85, German author.
- Alan Brownjohn, 92, English poet and novelist.
- Charles Burnett, 83, Scottish antiquarian.
- Irene Camber, 98, Italian fencer, Olympic champion (1952).
- Ronnie Campbell, 80, British politician, MP (1987–2019).
- Andreas Dress, 85, German mathematician.
- Buddy Duress, 38, American actor (Good Time, Heaven Knows What, Person to Person). (death announced on this date)
- Hakimullah Khan Durrani, 88, Pakistani military officer, Chief of the Air Staff (1988–1991).
- Ilse Falk, 80, German presbyter and politician, MP (1990–2009).
- Wilson Fittipaldi Júnior, 80, Brazilian racing driver (Formula One) and team manager (Fittipaldi Automotive).
- Flaco, 13, American owl, window collision.
- Chris Gauthier, 48, English-born Canadian actor (Once Upon a Time, Eureka, Freddy vs. Jason).
- Mike Gavins, 89, English rugby player (Leicester Tigers).
- Lynda Gravátt, 76, American actress (Roman J. Israel, Esq., The Hoop Life, Delivery Man).
- Sir Peter Gregson, 66, British research engineer.
- Brian Grundy, 78, English football player (Wigan Athletic, Bury) and manager (Glossop North End).
- Joan Haanappel, 83, Dutch Olympic figure skater (1956, 1960) and sports presenter.
- Manohar Joshi, 86, Indian politician, speaker of the Lok Sabha (2002–2004), chief minister of Maharashtra (1995–1999), and minister of heavy industries (1999–2002).
- Kalju Jurkatamm, 82, Estonian sprinter.
- Vyacheslav Lebedev, 80, Russian lawyer and jurist, chief justice (since 1989), cancer.
- Li Peicheng, 89, Chinese agricultural soil and water engineer.
- Jackie Loughery, 93, American actress (The D.I., Judge Roy Bean) and beauty pageant titleholder, Miss USA (1952).
- Francesco Marinelli, 88, Italian Roman Catholic prelate, archbishop of Urbino–Urbania–Sant'Angelo in Vado (2000–2011).
- Claude Montana, 76, French fashion designer.
- Petr Moos, 78, Czech engineer and politician.
- Antonio Mundo, 86, Italian lawyer and politician, deputy (1983–1994).
- Paul Muxlow, 85, American politician, member of the Michigan House of Representatives (2011–2016).
- G. Lasya Nanditha, 37, Indian politician, Telangana MLA (since 2023), traffic collision.
- Rajendra Sukhanand Patni, 59, Indian politician, Maharashtra MLA (2004–2009, since 2014).
- Don Poile, 91, Canadian ice hockey player (Detroit Red Wings).
- Tina Rainford, 77, German singer ("Silver Bird").
- Golden Richards, 73, American football player (Dallas Cowboys, Chicago Bears, Denver Broncos), Super Bowl champion (1978), congestive heart failure.
- Rui Rodrigues, 80, Portuguese football player (Académica, national team) and manager (Coimbra).
- Elżbieta Rogala-Kończak, 71, Polish politician, mayor of Rumia (2002–2014).
- Stephen Salter, 85, South African-born Scottish academic.
- Adama Samassékou, 78, Malian politician, minister of education (1993–2000).
- Shinsadong Tiger, 40, South Korean record producer ("U&I", "No No No").
- Giichi Tsunoda, 86, Japanese politician and lawyer, vice president of the House of Councillors (2004–2007).
- José María Vernet, 79, Argentine politician, governor of Santa Fe Province (1983–1987) and minister of foreign affairs (2001–2002).
- Arnott Whitney, 92, Canadian ice hockey player (Hershey Bears).

=== 24 ===
- Ahmed Abdul-Ghafur, 68–69, Iraqi politician, head of the Sunni Endowment Office (2005–2013).
- Pasqualino Abeti, 75, Italian Olympic sprinter (1972).
- Bill Alington, 94, New Zealand architect.
- Elizabeth Arnold, 65–66, American poet.
- Jean Maria Arrigo, 79, American social psychologist, complications from pancreatic cancer.
- Juana Bacallao, 98, Cuban singer and dancer.
- Paul Bail, 58, English cricketer (Somerset, Cambridge University).
- Kate Banks, 64, American children's writer.
- Charlie Biton, 76, Israeli social activist and politician, MK (1977–1992).
- Stan Bowles, 75, English footballer (Queens Park Rangers, Brentford, national team), complications from Alzheimer's disease.
- Bimla Buti, 90, Indian physicist.
- Jay Cimino, 87, American automotive industry executive.
- Philip E. Cryer, 84, American endocrinologist.
- Anne Ebbs, 83, Irish table tennis player, Paralympic silver medallist (1972, 1984).
- Ed Fitch, 86, American occult writer and Wiccan priest, stroke.
- Ramona Fradon, 97, American comic book artist (Aquaman, Brenda Starr, Reporter), co-creator of Metamorpho.
- Shaun George, 56, South African cricketer (Eastern Province, Transvaal) and umpire, stroke.
- Lyn Hejinian, 82, American poet, essayist, and translator.
- Kim Sang-won, 90, South Korean lawyer and judge, justice of the Supreme Court (1988–1994).
- Kotogatake Koichi, 71, Japanese sumo wrestler, heart failure.
- Ulrik le Fevre, 77, Danish footballer (Vejle BK, Club Brugge, national team).
- Martti Mansikka, 90, Finnish Olympic gymnast, bronze medallist (1956).
- Eric Mays, 65, American politician, member of the Flint City Council (since 2014).
- John Miller, 93, British architect.
- Kenneth Mitchell, 49, Canadian actor (Jericho, Star Trek: Discovery, Miracle), complications from amyotrophic lateral sclerosis.
- Xavier Ngoubeyou, 86, Cameroonian politician, senator (since 2018).
- Chris Nicholl, 77, English-born Northern Irish football player (Aston Villa, Southampton, Northern Ireland national team) and manager.
- Fred C. Noye, 77, American politician, member of the Pennsylvania House of Representatives (1973–1992).
- John Oldham, 91, American baseball player (Cincinnati Redlegs).
- Annamma Dorai Raj, 64, Indian-born Australian rheumatologist.
- Kumar Shahani, 83, Indian film director (Maya Darpan, Khayal Gatha, Kasba).
- Brian Stableford, 75, British science fiction writer (Balance of Power).
- Benoît van Innis, 63, Belgian visual artist and cartoonist.
- John Wackett, 93, English rugby union player (Welwyn, national team).
- Gunnar Weman, 91, Swedish Lutheran clergyman, archbishop of Uppsala and primate of Sweden (1993–1997).

=== 25 ===
- Bigidagoe, 26, Dutch rapper, shot.
- Bernard Broermann, 80, German businessman, founder of Asklepios Kliniken.
- Aaron Bushnell, 25, American military serviceman, suicide by self-immolation.
- Frank Cicero Jr., 88, American lawyer and historian.
- Patrick Cormack, Baron Cormack, 84, British politician, MP (1970–2010) and member of the House of Lords (since 2010).
- José DeLeón, 63, Dominican baseball player (Pittsburgh Pirates, Chicago White Sox, St. Louis Cardinals), cancer.
- Klaus Dick, 95, German Roman Catholic prelate, auxiliary bishop of Cologne (1975–2003).
- Charles Dierkop, 87, American actor (Police Woman, Butch Cassidy and the Sundance Kid, The Sting), complications from a heart attack and pneumonia.
- Morris Eaves, 79, American scholar.
- Carlos Espinoza, 95, Chilean footballer (Everton de Viña del Mar, national team).
- Fathi Ghaben, 77, Palestinian painter.
- Gabriela Grillo, 71, German equestrian, Olympic champion (1976).
- Sir James Hennessy, 100, British diplomat and public servant, chief inspector of prisons (1982–1987).
- Christopher Hyde-Smith, 88, British flautist.
- Jerzy Jarzębski, 76, Polish literary historian and critic.
- Bernard Kops, 97, British poet and dramatist.
- Dieter Kratzsch, 84, German ice hockey player (East Germany national team).
- Jack Langford, 80, Canadian politician, Saskatchewan MLA (1991–1999).
- Estella Leopold, 97, American conservationist.
- Benjamin K. Miller, 87, American judge, justice of the Illinois Supreme Court (1984–2001).
- Raja Venkatappa Naik, 64, Indian politician, four-time Karnataka MLA, heart attack.
- Yekaterina Novgorodova, 94, Russian agronomist and politician, deputy of the Supreme Soviet of the Soviet Union (1970–1989).
- Steve Okoniewski, 74, American football player (Green Bay Packers, Buffalo Bills, St. Louis Cardinals).
- Frank Popoff, 88, Bulgarian-born American businessman (Dow Chemical Company, TCF Financial Corporation).
- Glenn Postolski, 57, American-born Argentine researcher and academic.
- Georg Riedel, 90, Czechoslovak-born Swedish musician.
- Horst Schmidbauer, 83, German politician, MP (1990–2005).
- Fabian Schulze, 39, German pole vaulter.
- Nafe Singh Rathee, 67, Indian politician, Haryana MLA (1996–2005), shot.
- Jiří Suchý, 36, Czech ice hockey player (Halifax Mooseheads, Vítkovice, Poruba), traffic collision. (death announced on this date)
- Zong Qinghou, 78, Chinese beverage industry executive, founder of the Hangzhou Wahaha Group, delegate to the National People's Congress (2002–2018).

=== 26 ===
- Rolf Aamot, 89, Norwegian visual artist.
- Luul Abdiaziz Mohamed, 29, Somali civil servant, burned.
- Bhakta Raj Acharya, 81, Nepali singer and composer.
- Jorge Acuña, Uruguayan footballer (Peñarol, national team).
- Ole Anderson, 81, American professional wrestler (JCP), booker (WCW) and promoter (GCW).
- Ernesto Assante, 66, Italian music critic.
- Michael Barrier, 90, American actor.
- William H. Brandenburg, 72, American major general.
- Rebekah Byler, 23, American Amish woman, shot.
- Tom Colclough, 62, Canadian musician.
- Charlie Crofts, 80, New Zealand Māori leader.
- Digby Crozier, 96, Australian politician, Victoria AM (1973–1988).
- Giuseppe D'Altrui, 89, Italian water polo player, Olympic champion (1960).
- Dimitar Dimitrov, 77, Bulgarian Olympic gymnast (1972). (death announced on this date)
- John Farber, 98, Romanian-born American businessman and billionaire.
- Carlos Fernandes, 40, Angolan LGBT activist, asphyxiated.
- Alois Glück, 84, German politician, member (1970–2008) and president (2003–2008) of the Landtag of Bavaria.
- Pilar Gonzalbo Aizpuru, 89, Spanish-Mexican cultural historian.
- Mahogany Jackson, 20, American woman, shot.
- Gabriele Just, 87, German chess player.
- Klaus Klostermaier, 90, German Catholic priest, Indologist and academic.
- Salah Larbès, 71, Algerian footballer (JS Kabylie, national team).
- Andrew McArthur, 88, Scottish-born Canadian shipbuilder (Saint John Shipbuilding, Halifax Shipyards).
- Lucien Pellat-Finet, 78, French fashion designer, drowned.
- Sergei Plekhanov, 77, Russian political scientist, cancer. (death announced on this date)
- René Pollesch, 61, German author and playwright.
- Craig Roh, 33, American football player (BC Lions, Winnipeg Blue Bombers, Toronto Argonauts), colon cancer.
- Jacob Rothschild, 4th Baron Rothschild, 87, British investment banker and peer, member of the House of Lords (1991–1999).
- Jan Senbergs, 84–85, Latvian-born Australian artist and printmaker. (death announced on this date)
- Denis St-Jules, 73, Canadian writer and radio broadcaster.
- Pankaj Udhas, 72, Indian ghazal singer.
- Santiago B. Villafania, 53, Filipino poet.
- Tep Vong, 92, Cambodian Buddhist monk, supreme patriarch (since 1981).
- Stein Winge, 83, Norwegian theatre director (National Theatre).
- Ruth Wolf-Rehfeldt, 92, German artist.

=== 27 ===
- Shafiqur Rahman Barq, 93, Indian politician, MP (1996–1999, 2004–2014, since 2019) and twice Uttar Pradesh MLA.
- Ellen Bernstein, 70, American rabbi, colon cancer.
- Michael Culver, 85, British actor (The Empire Strikes Back, A Passage to India, The Adventures of Black Beauty).
- Osvaldo Cunha, 80, Brazilian footballer (Corinthians, São Paulo, Guarani).
- Ronnie de Mel, 98, Sri Lankan economist and politician, minister of finance (1977–1988) and MP (1970–1989, 1994–2004).
- Egai Talusan Fernandez, 68, Filipino painter.
- John Flynn, 70, Australian politician, Queensland MLA (1989–1992).
- John W. Hayes, 85, British archaeologist.
- Arild Holm, 82, Norwegian Olympic alpine skier (1964).
- Jean Carlos, 50, Brazilian footballer (Guarani, Paulista, Santo André), prostate cancer.
- Robert Leon Jordan, 89, American jurist, judge of the U.S. District Court for Eastern Tennessee (since 1988).
- Richard Lewis, 76, American comedian and actor (Curb Your Enthusiasm, Anything but Love, Robin Hood: Men in Tights), heart attack.
- Li Shuzheng, 94, Chinese politician, head of the International Department of the Chinese Communist Party (1993–1997).
- Gösta Lundell, 89, Swedish footballer (Hammarby, national team).
- Guido Macor, 91, Italian footballer (SPAL, Genoa, Catania).
- Dale Messer, 86, American football player (San Francisco 49ers).
- Camila Perissé, 70, Argentine actress (Atrapadas, Siempre es difícil volver a casa), dancer and vedette, pneumonia.
- Edward B. Roberts, 88, American academic.
- Bob Shaw, 95, American gospel singer and politician.
- Eva Smolková-Keulemansová, 96, Czech analytical chemist, academic and Holocaust survivor.
- Jean-Pierre Soisson, 89, French politician, minister of agriculture (1992–1993), deputy (1968–2012), and mayor of Auxerre (1971–1998), cancer.
- Suratman Markasan, 93, Singaporean author.
- Richard H. Truly, 86, American Navy vice admiral, fighter pilot, and astronaut, administrator of NASA (1989–1992).
- Darryl Van de Velde, 72, Australian rugby league player (Redcliffe, Queensland) and coach (Castleford Tigers).

=== 28 ===
- Jean Allison, 94, American actress (Bad Company, Gunsmoke, Devil's Partner).
- Félix Aráuz, 88, Ecuadorian painter.
- Ronald Bennett, 88, Irish Franciscan priest and convicted child abuser. (death announced on this date)
- Presley Carson, 55, Honduran footballer (Motagua, Victoria, national team), heart attack.
- Victoria Catlin, 71, American actress (Twin Peaks, Maniac Cop, Howling V: The Rebirth).
- William A. Catterall, 77, American pharmacologist and neurobiologist.
- Yaya Dillo Djérou, 49, Chadian politician, shot.
- Frank Haig, 95, American Jesuit priest, physicist and academic administrator.
- Fred Heese, 81, Canadian Olympic sprint canoer (1964).
- Bob Heil, 83, American sound and radio engineer.
- Eugen Indjic, 76, Yugoslav-born French-American pianist.
- Cat Janice, 31, American singer-songwriter, cancer.
- Lisa Lane, 90, American chess player, cancer.
- Anneke Levelt Sengers, 94, Dutch physicist.
- Luis Molteni, 73, Italian actor (Pinocchio, Giallo, Guardami).
- Achim Müller, 86, German chemist.
- Dave Myers, 66, English chef and television presenter (The Hairy Bikers' Cookbook), cancer.
- Hamid Najah, 74–75, Moroccan actor, poet, and artist.
- Werner Nold, 90, Swiss-Canadian film editor (Mario, Pour la suite du monde, IXE-13).
- Héctor Ortiz, 54, Puerto Rican baseball player (Kansas City Royals) and coach (Texas Rangers), pancreatic cancer.
- Fabian Osuji, 82, Nigerian politician, minister of education (2003–2005).
- Paul Reiss, 93, American sociologist and academic.
- Nikolai Ryzhkov, 94, Russian politician, premier of the Soviet Union (1985–1991), senator (2003–2023), and member of the Politburo (1985–1990).
- Avtar Saini, Indian microprocessor designer and developer, traffic collision.
- Ahmed Salim, 35, Bangladeshi painter and convicted murderer, execution by hanging.
- Avraham Shochat, 87, Israeli politician, minister of finance (1992–1996, 1999–2001).
- Ben Stern, 102, Polish-American writer, activist and Holocaust survivor.
- José Alberto Tejada, 66, Colombian politician, member of the Chamber of Representatives (since 2022).
- Virgil, 72, American professional wrestler (WWF, WCW) and actor (Bridge and Tunnel), complications from strokes and dementia.
- Noah Wenger, 89, American politician and farmer, member of the Pennsylvania House of Representatives (1977–1982) and Senate (1983–2006).

=== 29 ===
- David Bordwell, 76, American film historian and theorist, idiopathic pulmonary fibrosis.
- John Etty, 97, English rugby league player (Batley Bulldogs, Oldham, Wakefield Trinity).
- Johnny Gentle, 87, British pop singer.
- Lanny Gumulya, 79, Indonesian diver.
- Ruth Henig, Baroness Henig, 80, British historian and politician, member of the House of Lords (since 2004).
- Betty Holzendorf, 84, American politician, member of the Florida House of Representatives (1988–1992) and Senate (1992–2002).
- Brian Mulroney, 84, Canadian politician, prime minister (1984–1993) and MP (1983–1993), complications from a fall.
- Ali Hassan Mwinyi, 98, Tanzanian politician, president (1985–1995), vice-president (1984–1985), and president of Zanzibar (1984–1985), lung cancer.
- John O'Neill, 88, Australian football player (Geelong).
- Andy Russell, 82, American football player (Pittsburgh Steelers).
- Tiffany Scott, 32, Scottish transgender woman and prisoner.
- K. Shivram, 70, Indian actor (Baa Nalle Madhuchandrake, Tiger) and civil servant, heart attack.
- Eugen Šváb, 89, Slovak swing musician.
- Paolo Taviani, 92, Italian film director (Allonsanfàn, Padre Padrone, Kaos) and screenwriter, pulmonary edema.
- Paul Vachon, 86, Canadian professional wrestler (AWA, GCW, Stampede Wrestling).
- Vaddepalli Srinivas, 64, Indian singer and folk artist.
- Linda White, 64, Australian politician, senator (since 2022).
