= Annamma Dorai Raj =

- Born: 1959/12/24
- Died: 2024/02/24
- Education: Andra Medical School
- Occupation: Rheumatologist

Annamma Kochummen Dorai Raj (1959–2024) was a rheumatologist who worked across ACT and NSW in Australia. She was a founding staff member of the Australian National University medical school. She was a dedicated teacher who trained multiple junior doctors as well as trainees in rheumatology.

She was involved with teaching as well as working in clinical medicine both Canberra as well as country NSW. Prior to tele-health becoming popular post pandemic Anna was able to set up remote support with rural clinics in country NSW. She had regular clinics in rural areas like Tumut where people have limited support.

== Career ==
She completed her undergraduate training in India and migrated to the UK and subsequently worked in Australia. She was involved with medical education from medical school through to advanced training in rheumatology.

Her clinical work informed her teaching as well as research.

She worked with the Australian OPAL (Optimising Patient outcomes in Australian Rheumatology) group which improves patient outcomes with research. This offered the availability of a data set that was updated by clinicians in real-time; which also offered trainees the opportunity to work on regular research.

Despite her early demise her work continues with the programs that she set up both at local teaching institutions as well as international research collaborations. Her patients pay tribute to the care provided to them with both kindness and support as they navigated their disease process.

=== Publications ===
- Dahlstrom Jane, Dorai-Raj Anna, McGill Darryl, Owen Cathy, Tymms Kathleen & Watson D Ashley R. (2005). What motivates senior clinicians to teach medical students? BMC Medical Education 2005 Jul 18;5:27. doi: 10.1186/1472-6920-5-27.
- Deakin Claire T, De Stavola Bianca, Littlejohn Geoffrey et al. Comparative Effectiveness of Adalimumab vs Tofacitinib in Patients With Rheumatoid Arthritis in Australia. (2023) JAMA Netw Open. 2023;6(6):e2320851. doi:10.1001/jamanetworkopen.2023.20851
- Dorai Raj, Anna. (2008). Infliximab therapy in severe active ankylosing spondylitis with spinal ankylosis Internal Medicine Journal 2008 Jun 38(6) 396 -401 Cheung PPM, Tymms KE, Wilson BJ, Shadbolt B, Brook AS, Dorai Raj AK, Khoo KBK. Internal Medicine Journal.
- Dorai Raj, Anna. (2007). Nephrogenic fibrosing dermopathy: a new clinical entity mimicking scleroderma. Intern Med J. 2007 Feb;37(2):139-41. Cheung PP, Dorai Raj AK.. Internal Medicine Journal.
- Prince FHM, Dorai Raj AK, Otten MH, Cheung PPM, Tymms KE, van Suijlekom-Smit LWA, et al. TNF-alpha inhibitors for juvenile idiopathic arthritis. The Cochrane Database of Systematic Reviews. 2018;2018(8):CD008598
- Kong DCH, Sturgiss EA, Dorai Raj AK, et al What factors contribute to uncontrolled gout and hospital admission? A qualitative study of inpatients and their primary care practitioners BMJ Open 2019;9:e033726. doi: 10.1136/bmjopen-2019-033726
