= María Carmen Mas Rubio =

Spanish lawyer and politician (1954–2024)

Carmen Mas Rubio

Member of the Corts Valencianes for Valencia
- In office 22 May 1996 – 15 May 2000
- Preceded by: Carlos Javier González Cepeda
- Succeeded by: Salvador Cortes Llopis

Personal details
- Born: María Carmen Mas Rubio; 30 May 1954 Valencia, Spain
- Died: 15 February 2024 (aged 69)
- Party: PP
- Occupation: Lawyer

María Carmen Mas Rubio (30 May 1954 – 15 February 2024) was a Spanish lawyer and politician. A member of the People's Party, she served in the Corts Valencianes from 1996 to 2000 and regional minister of Social Welfare between 1999 and 2000.

Mas died on 15 February 2024, at the age of 69.
