= Nivaldo Passos Krüger =

Brazilian politician (1929–2024)

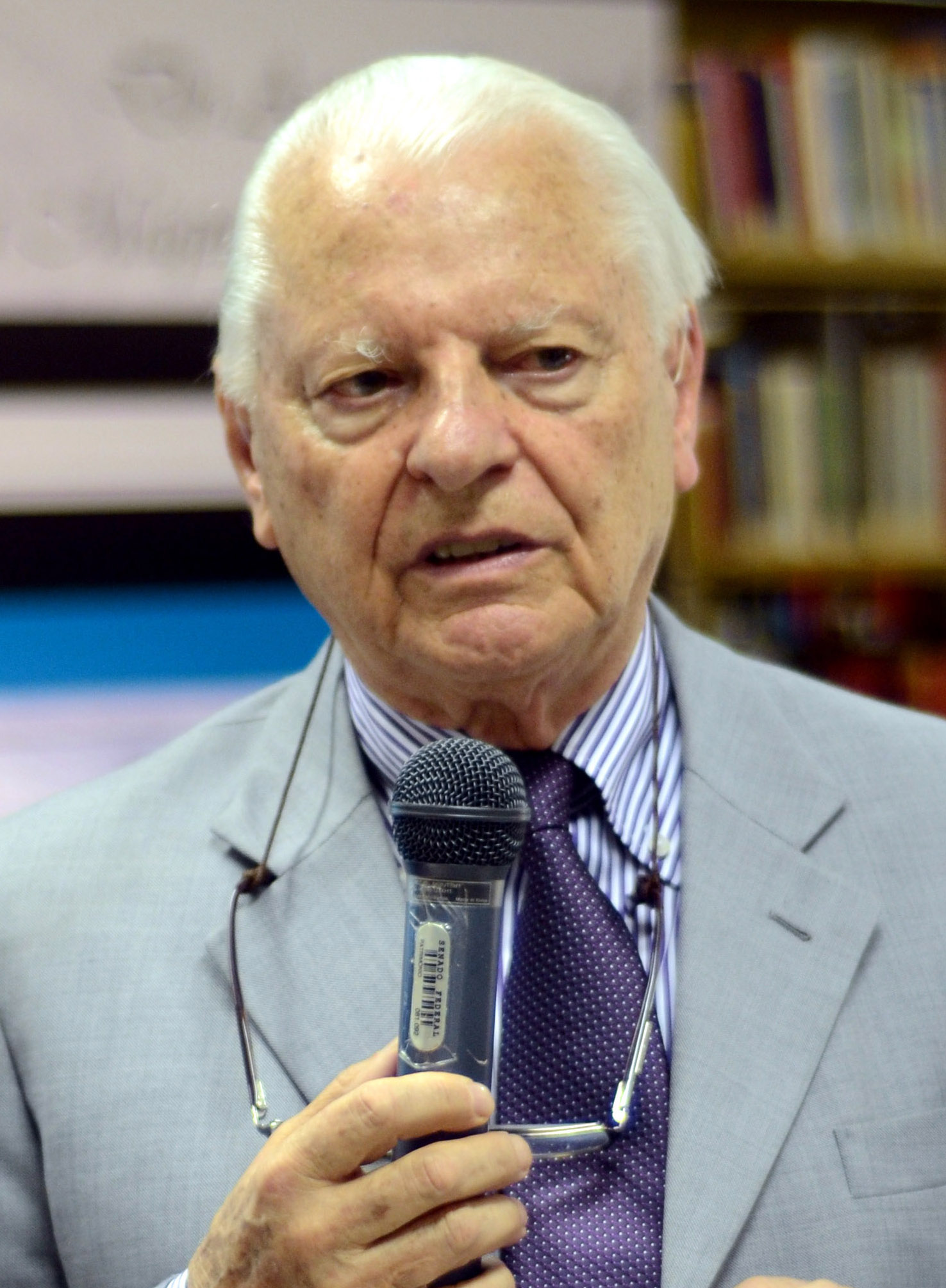
- Krüger in 2011

Member of the Federal Senate of Brazil for Paraná
- In office 18 December 2002 – 31 January 2003

Member of the Chamber of Deputies of Brazil for Paraná
- In office 1 January 1979 – 31 December 1982

Personal details
- Born: 27 May 1929 Canoinhas, Santa Catarina, Brazil
- Died: 14 February 2024 (aged 94) Guarapuava, Paraná, Brazil
- Political party: PSD (1955–1965); MDB (1966–2024)
- Occupation: Farmer

Nivaldo Passos Krüger (27 May 1929 – 14 February 2024) was a Brazilian farmer and politician. A member of the Brazilian Democratic Movement, he served in the Legislative Assembly of Paraná from 1970 to 1972, the Chamber of Deputies from 1979 to 1982 and the Federal Senate from 2002 to 2003.

Krüger died in Guarapuava on 14 February 2024, at the age of 94.
