= Bruce Newman =

American antiques dealer

Bruce Newman (January 27, 1930 – February 9, 2024) was an American antique dealer. In 1989, Newman and his wife Judith published the book Fantasy Furniture, a history of fantasy furniture. In 1992, they donated 16 furniture pieces in the style to the Brooklyn Museum.

In 2006, Newman published the memoir Don't Come Back Until You Find It: Tales from an Antiques Dealer.
