= Christos Fotiou =

Greek politician (1939–2024)

- Χρήστος Φωτίου

Member of the Hellenic Parliament for Athens B
- In office 1981–1989

Personal details
- Born: 1939 Piraeus, Greece
- Died: 2 February 2024 (aged 85) Piraeus, Greece
- Party: PASOK; EDA
- Education: National and Kapodistrian University of Athens
- Occupation: Lawyer

Christos Fotiou (Greek: Χρήστος Φωτίου; 1939 – 2 February 2024) was a Greek lawyer and politician. A member of PASOK and the United Democratic Left, he served as a Member of the Hellenic Parliament from 1981 to 1989, as Deputy Minister of Commerce, and as Mayor of Keratsini.

== Biography ==
Fotiou studied law at the National and Kapodistrian University of Athens and worked as a lawyer. Involved in left-wing politics, he was active with the United Democratic Left (EDA) before later joining PASOK.

He was elected to the Hellenic Parliament representing Athens B in 1981 and served until 1989. During his political career, he also served as Deputy Minister of Commerce and held local office as Mayor of Keratsini.

Fotiou died in Piraeus on 2 February 2024, at the age of 85.
