= Viktoria Siradze =

Georgian politician

Viktoria Moiseyevna "Vika" Siradze (Georgian: ვიქტორია "ვიკა" სირაძე; Russian: Викто́рия Моисе́евна Сира́дзе; 27 May 1929, Tbilisi – 22 February 2024) was a Georgian politician. She was a deputy in the Supreme Soviet of the Georgian Soviet Socialist Republic from 1955 to 1962 and 1967 to 1989. She was appointed Deputy Prime Minister of the Georgian Soviet Socialist Republic in 1962.
