= Eva Dobiášová =

Czech basketball player (1933–2024)

Eva Krizova-Dobiasova
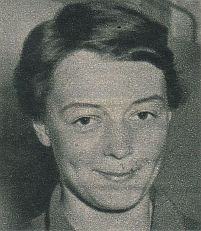
- Born: Eva Dobiášová; December 25, 1933; Prague
- Died: February 6, 2024 (aged 90)
- Occupations: basketball player and sports journalist
- Known for: Czech Basketball Federation Hall of Fame

Eva Křížová (born Dobiášová, later Škutinová; 25 December 1933 – 6 February 2024) was a Czechoslovak basketball player and sports journalist. She was born in Prague and represented Czechoslovakia from 1952 to 1961, playing 126 international matches. She was named a Master of Sport and was inducted into the Czech Basketball Federation Hall of Fame in 2005.

Křížová competed at two FIBA Women's World Championships and three European Championships, winning five medals. She won a silver medal at the 1954 European Championship and bronze medals at the 1956 and 1958 European Championships and the 1957 and 1959 World Championships.

At club level, she played 11 seasons in the Czechoslovak women's league, mainly for Slovan Orbis Prague and Sparta Prague. She won the Czechoslovak championship eight times and finished runner-up twice. With Slovan Orbis, she also reached the final of the FIBA Women's European Champions Cup in 1961, losing to Daugava Riga.

After retiring from basketball, Křížová worked in sports administration and journalism. From 1951 to 1962 she worked for Lidové noviny, Czechoslovak Radio and the magazine Košíková–odbíjená. She later worked for Czechoslovak Television and the Institute of Health Education, where she hosted the television programme Lékař a Vy. From 1993 to 2013, she worked for the Prague League Against Cancer.

Křížová died in 2024, at the age of 90.
