= Abdelali Abdelmoula =

Moroccan businessman and politician (1948–2024)

- عبد العالي عبد المولى

Member of the House of Representatives of Morocco for Sidi Kacem
- In office 2011–2016

Personal details
- Born: 15 May 1948 El Jadida, Morocco
- Died: 9 February 2024 (aged 75)
- Party: JDP
- Occupation: Businessman

Abdelali Abdelmoula (Arabic: عبد العالي عبد المولى; 15 May 1948 – 9 February 2024) was a Moroccan businessman and politician of the Justice and Development Party (JDP).

Abdelmoula was the founder and longtime CEO of ferry company Comarit. In 2011, he was elected to the House of Representatives to represent Sidi Kacem.
