= José Peláez Bardales =

Peruvian lawyer and politician (1946–2024)

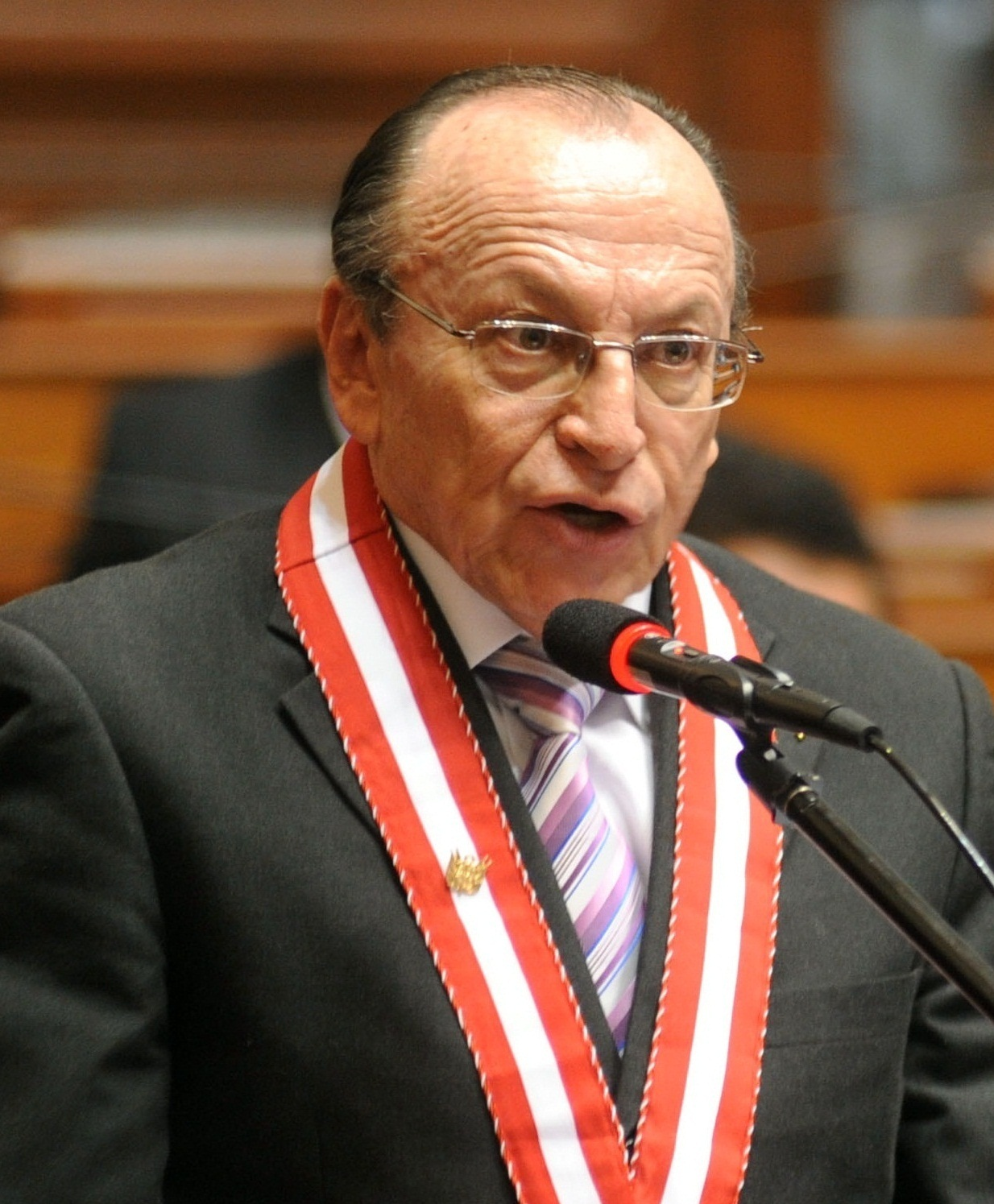

Attorney General of Peru
- In office 12 May 2011 – 9 April 2014
- Preceded by: Gladys Echaíz
- Succeeded by: Carlos Ramos Heredia

Personal details
- Born: José Antonio Peláez Bardales; 21 August 1946; Chachapoyas, Peru
- Died: 5 February 2024 (aged 77); Lima, Peru
- Political party: PSN
- Education: National University of San Marcos
- Occupation: Lawyer

José Antonio Peláez Bardales (21 August 1946 – 5 February 2024) was a Peruvian lawyer and politician. A member of National Solidarity, he served as Attorney General from 2011 to 2014.

Peláez died in Lima on 5 February 2024, at the age of 77.
