= Mike Gavins =

England international rugby union player (1934–2024)

- Born: Michael Neil Gavins; 14 October 1934 Leeds, England
- Died: 23 February 2024 (aged 89)
- Occupation: Teacher

Rugby union career
- Position: Full Back
Senior career
Years	Team	Apps	(Points)
1957–61; 1970	Leicester Tigers	121	(592)
International career
Years	Team	Apps	(Points)
1961	England	1	(0)

Michael Neil Gavins (14 October 1934 – 23 February 2024), commonly known as Mike Gavins, was an English rugby union full back who played 121 games for Leicester Tigers between 1957 and 1970; he represented England once in 1961. In later life he became a teacher of Economics and a Housemaster at Uppingham School

Gavins was born in Leeds on 14 October 1934. He made his Leicester debut against the RAF on 31 January 1957, initially he struggled to establish himself in the side making only 11 appearances in his first season and a half. Gavins became first choice full back for the 1958/59 season also taking over kicking duties he scored 145 points this season. In 1959/60 he started 35 of Tigers 40 games, the most of any player and top scored again with 153 points. Gavins made his sole international appearance on 21 January 1961 against Wales in Cardiff. Gavins left the club in 1961 as Scottish international Ken Scotland joined the club and monopolised the fullback jersey.

Injuries to Robin Money and Richard Cooper gave Gavins an unexpected extension to his Tigers career playing a further 14 games between September and November 1970, despite only featuring in those 14 games he was once again Leicester's top scorer for the season with 115 points.

Gavins died on 23 February 2024, at the age of 89.
