= Howard Hawking =

Australian rules footballer (born 1933)

Personal information
- Full name: Howard John Hawking
- Born: 23 May 1933
- Died: 8 February 2024 (aged 90)
- Original team: Rushworth
- Height: 184 cm (6 ft 0 in)
- Weight: 79 kg (174 lb)

Playing career^{1}
Years	Club	Games (Goals)
1954–55	Geelong	11 (0)
- ^{1} Playing statistics correct to the end of 1955.

Howard John Hawking (born 23 May 1933 – 8 February 2024) was an Australian rules footballer who played with Geelong in the Victorian Football League (VFL).
