= Movlud Suleymanli =

Armenian writer

- Born: 18 March 1943
- Died: 21 February 2024 (aged 80)
- Occupations: Dramaturge, writer, Screenwriter

Mövlud Süleymanlı (18 March 1943 – 21 February 2024) was an Azerbaijani writer, dramatist, screenwriter, and film adviser. He was a member of the Union of Azerbaijani Writers from 1980. He was an honored arts figure and the vice-chairman of the "Azerbaijan Television and Radio" limited company. Suleymanli died on 21 February 2024, at the age of 80.

Suleymanli won the "Qızıl qələm“ (Golden Pen) award of the Union of Azerbaijani Writers, and the All-union literary competition in the name of Maxim Gorky. His first book was published in Russian in Moscow. He won the Qızıl Sünbül (Golden Ear) laureate of the Union of Azerbaijani Writers for "the best work dedicated to rustication", "Araz" high literary award owing to his achievement in the field of fictional and non-fictional publicity, ANASAM award certificate owing to the novel "Deportation" and the best work of the year, estimation award of the "Anadolu Conference".

== Works ==
Suleymanli began with "My Hands", a poem published in an Azerbaijani Youth newspaper in 1964. In 1974 he was awarded “Qızıl Qalam “ ( Golden Pen ) of Union of Azerbaijani Writers, for his role in promulgation of Azerbaijani folklore, ethnography, language, and family life. In 1972 The Committee of Teleradio broadcasts sent him to Moscow to study.

He was admitted to Azerbaijani Film Studio in the name of Jafar Jabbarly as a screenwriter in 1974.

He wrote television films: Abduction of groom on the basis of his scenario and Our gamp is cloud on an order of Moscow State Cinematography Committee. Association of Azerbaijani Writers invited him to a job in 1976.

He became a member of Union of Azerbaijani Writers in 1974. From 1976 to 1980, Suleymanlı was director of prosaic department in Star journal of the Association of Azerbaijani Writers. He led the prose department of Azerbaijan journal of the Association of Azerbaijani Writers.

He served as editor-in-chief for Oguz eli (Oguz people ). It played a significant role in literary and cultural life of the republic. Mill (Dəyirman) was a theatrical treatment of his "Mill" novelette in Sumgait Drama Theatre.

== Filmography ==
- Ağstafa Şərabçıları (film, 1992) Winemakers of Agstafa
- Bəyin oğurlanması (film, 1986) Abduction of groom
- Bəylik dərsi (film, 2007) Lesson of nobility
- Çətirimiz buludlardır (film, 1976) Our umbrella is cloud
- Dad (film, 1984) Taste
- Deportasiya (film, 2001) Deportation
- Deportasiya. II Film (film) Deportation II Film (film)
- Deportasiya. III Film (film) Deportation III Film (film)
- Deportasiya. IV Film (film) Deportation IV Film (film)
- Deportasiya. V Film (film) Deportation V Film (film)
- Deportasiya. VI Film (film) Deportation VI Film (film)
- Deportasiya. VII Film (film) Deportation VII Film (film)
- Fatehlərin divanı (film, 1997) Conquers` reprisal
- Hücum (film, 1989) Attack
- Kökdən düşmüş piano (film, 1982) Piano outed of tune
