= Geoffrey Hickinbottom =

English cricketer (1932–2024)

Personal information
- Full name: Geoffrey Alfred Hickinbottom
- Born: 15 November 1932; Leicester, Leicestershire, England
- Died: 2 February 2024 (aged 91)
- Batting: Right-handed
- Role: Wicket-keeper

Domestic team information
- Years: Team
- 1959: Leicestershire

Career statistics
Competition	First-class
Matches	5
Runs scored	6
Batting average	3.00
100s/50s	–/–
Top score	4*
Balls bowled	–
Wickets	–
Bowling average	–
5 wickets in innings	–
10 wickets in match	–
Best bowling	–
Catches/stumpings	4/3
- Source: Cricinfo, 3 March 2012

Geoffrey Alfred Hickinbottom (15 November 1932 – 2 February 2024) was an English cricketer. Hickinbottom was a right-handed batter who played as a wicket-keeper for Leicestershire in 1959. He was born at Leicester, Leicestershire.

Hickinbottom made his first-class debut for Leicestershire against Yorkshire in the 1959 County Championship. He made four further first-class appearances for the county in that season, the last of which came against Glamorgan. A specialist wicket-keeper, he took four catches and made three stumpings behind the stumps, while with the bat he scored six runs.

His death was announced by Leicestershire County Cricket Club on 4 March 2024.
