= Antonio Mundo =

Italian politician (1938–2024)

Member of the Chamber of Deputies of Italy for Calabria
- In office 8 July 1983 – 14 April 1994

Personal details
- Born: 3 January 1938 Albidona, Italy
- Died: 23 February 2024 (aged 86) Cosenza, Italy
- Party: PSI
- Education: University of Bari
- Occupation: Lawyer

Antonio Mundo (3 January 1938 – 23 February 2024) was an Italian lawyer and politician. A member of the Italian Socialist Party, he served in the Chamber of Deputies from 1983 to 1994.

Mundo died in Cosenza on 23 February 2024, at the age of 86.
