= Ben Stern =

Polish-born Jewish Holocaust survivor (1921–2024)

- Born: Bendet Sztern; September 21, 1921; Warsaw, Poland
- Died: February 28, 2024 (aged 102)
- Spouse: Chaya "Helen" Kielmanowicz
- Children: 2

Ben Stern (September 21, 1921 – February 28, 2024) was a Polish-born Jewish Holocaust survivor, activist, and author.

== Early life ==
Bendet Sztern was born in Warsaw, Poland, in 1921, the second youngest of his parents' eventual nine children. In 1928, at the age of 7, his family moved to Mogielnica, Poland, where his father studied religious texts and his mother managed their family's liquor store. Stern attended public school.

In September 1933, fearing he would be seized when Germany invaded Poland, he left by train for Soviet-occupied Poland.

== World War II ==
Following the German invasion in 1939, his family was sent to a ghetto in Mogielnica, Poland, and then, in November 1940, on to the Warsaw Ghetto where his father died in 1942. On August 15, 1942, Stern was separated from his family. While he was sent to the Majdanek concentration camp, where his assignment was to wash potatoes, most of his family perished in the Treblinka extermination camp. His mother, eight brothers and one sister were all killed.

Stern was later doomed by one of Josef Mengele "selections" at Auschwitz but evaded death by reporting a false prisoner number. Ben Stern was tattooed in the concentration camps with the number 129592 and a triangle indicating he was a dangerous Jew.

Close to the end of the war, he survived an attempted bombing of a Jewish barrack when a guard failed to ignite the bomb.

On April 3, 1945, Stern was one of the seven thousand boys that left Buchenwald on their death march. After 35 days of marching to the Tyrolian mountains, surviving on only four boiled potatoes each day, only 156 survived.

On May 3, 1945, Stern was liberated by the United States Army. Stern met his wife, Chaya "Helen" Kielmanowicz (d. 2018), in the Bergen-Belsen displaced persons camp following the end of the war; the two married six weeks later.

By the end of World War II, Stern had survived 2 Jewish ghettos (Mogielnica and Warsaw), 9 concentration camps (Majdanek, Auschwitz-Birkenau, Buna-Monovice, Jewishowice/Brzezinki, Buchenwald, Ohrdruf, Grafinkl, Celten Lager, Liebanau by Lauffen), and 2 death marches in January and April 1945.

== Personal life ==
In 1946, he emigrated to Chicago, Illinois in the United States with his wife, where he worked as a carpenter and then founded a laundry business.

In 2008, he moved to Berkeley, California. In 2017, Stern, then 95, received coverage after becoming roommates with the granddaughter of a Nazi, who was studying for her master's degree in Jewish Studies at Berkeley's Graduate Theological Union.

Stern had two daughters and one son. He died on February 28, 2024, at the age of 102.

== Activism ==
In 1977, Ben Stern worked to prevent the neo-Nazi Socialist Party of America from marching in Skokie, Illinois, by leading a small group of Holocaust survivors in a public battle to prevent the march. He collected 750,000 signatures opposing the Nazi march and rallied 60,000 Jews and Christians who planned to show up at the march in a counter-demonstration. The mayor of Skokie advised the Nazis that he would not be able to guarantee their safety and the demonstration was canceled.

In 2017, he once again opposed a group of white supremacists when they threatened to stage a rally near his home in Berkeley, California. The Jewish community countered with their own rally with Ben Stern as one of the speakers.

In 2019, Stern spoke at a protest against ICE in San Francisco.

== Writing ==
Ben Stern co-authored his memoir, Near Normal Man: Survival with Courage, Kindness, and Hope, with his daughter, Charlene Stern. The memoir took its name from a 2017 documentary Charlene made about her father, titled, Near Normal Man.
