= Gerhard Poppendiecker =

German politician (1937–2024)

Member of the Landtag of Schleswig-Holstein
- In office 2 October 1987 – 17 March 2005
- Preceded by: Bertold Sprenger
- Succeeded by: Klaus Klinckhamer
- Constituency: Oldenburg

Personal details
- Born: 26 December 1937 Heiligenhafen, Gau Schleswig-Holstein, Germany
- Died: 17 February 2024 (aged 86)
- Party: SPD
- Occupation: Postal worker

Gerhard Poppendiecker (26 December 1937 – 17 February 2024) was a German postal worker and politician. A member of the Social Democratic Party, he served in the Landtag of Schleswig-Holstein from 1987 to 2005.

Poppendiecker died on 17 February 2024, at the age of 86.
