= Jan Højland =

Danish footballer (1952–2024)

Personal information
- Full name: Jan Højland Nielsen
- Date of birth: 15 January 1952
- Place of birth: Frederiksberg, Denmark
- Date of death: 3 February 2024 (aged 72)
- Positions: Midfielder; sweeper

Senior career*
Years	Team	Apps	(Gls)
1970–1974	B.93		
1974–1979	1860 Munich		
1979–1982	B.93		
1982	KB		

International career
1974–1978	Denmark	5	(0)
- * Club domestic league appearances and goals

Jan Højland Nielsen (15 January 1952 – 3 February 2024) was a Danish professional footballer who played as a midfielder or sweeper. He made five appearances for the Denmark national team from 1974 to 1978. Højland died on 3 February 2024, at the age of 72.
