= Ton van der Laaken =

Dutch korfball player and referee

Ton van der Laaken (7 February 1953 – 7 February 2024) was a Dutch korfball player, korfball coach and most known as (international) korfball referee. He won five times the best Dutch referee award.

== Biography ==
Van der Laaken was born in 1953 in The Hague. As a korfball player he played with HKV Achilles in the Dutch first division. During his playing career he was also already a club coach. After his playing career he became a referee. As an international International Korfball Federation referee, he was the referee at among others the 1989 World Games. In the Netherlands he was five times the referee of the Korfball Final in Rotterdam Ahoy, inclusive the 1990 final. His last final was in 1995. Van der Laaken won five times the Dutch best referee award.

Over the years he was a coach at several clubs, including H.K.C. ALO, KVS, De Meervogels, HKC ALO, ONDO, Refleks, Excelsior, KCC and HKV Achilles. He was active as a coach at HKV Achilles until 2019.

Van der Laaken died after a long illness on 7 February 2024 in The Hague, at the age of 71 years.
