= Steven Ward (cricketer) =

English cricketer

Personal information
- Full name: Steven Ward
- Born: 30 October 1958; Horden, County Durham, England
- Died: 18 February 2024 (aged 65)
- Batting: Left-handed
- Bowling: Right-arm medium-fast

Domestic team information
- Years: Team
- 1987: Durham

Career statistics
Competition	List A
Matches	1
Runs scored	–
Batting average	–
100s/50s	–/–
Top score	–
Balls bowled	36
Wickets	–
Bowling average	–
5 wickets in innings	–
10 wickets in match	–
Best bowling	–
Catches/stumpings	–/–
- Source: Cricinfo, 7 August 2011

Steven Ward (30 October 1958 – 18 February 2024) was an English cricketer. Ward was a left-handed batsman who bowled right-arm medium-fast. He was born in Horden, County Durham.

Ward made his debut for Durham against Hertfordshire in 1987 Minor Counties Championship. He played Minor counties cricket for Durham only in the 1987 season, making 3 further Minor Counties Championship appearances. He made his only List A appearance against Middlesex in the 1987 NatWest Trophy. He didn't bat in the match, while with the ball he bowled 6 wicket-less overs.
