= Márcia Marinho =

Brazilian politician (1963–2024)

Member of the Chamber of Deputies of Brazil for Maranhão
- In office 1 February 1995 – 1 January 2001

Personal details
- Born: Márcia Regina Serejo Marinho; 22 October 1963 Caxias, Maranhão, Brazil
- Died: 3 February 2024 (aged 60) Teresina, Piauí, Brazil
- Party: PDS (1980–1989); PSC (1989–1996); PSDB (1996–2001); DEM (2001–2004); MDB (2004–2024)
- Education: Federal University of Maranhão
- Occupation: Doctor

Márcia Regina Serejo Marinho (22 October 1963 – 3 February 2024) was a Brazilian doctor and politician. A member of the Brazilian Social Democracy Party and the Democrats, she served in the Chamber of Deputies from 1995 to 2001.

Marinho died of cancer in Teresina on 3 February 2024, at the age of 60.
