= Mikalai Labko =

Belarusian politician (1948–2024)

- Мікалай Лабко

Member of the Supreme Council of Belarus
- In office 15 May 1990 – 9 January 1996

Personal details
- Born: Mikalai Mikalayevich Labko; 5 May 1948 Kliepačy, Nyasvizh District, Minsk Oblast, Byelorussian SSR, USSR
- Died: 22 February 2024 (aged 75)
- Party: CPSU (until 1991)
- Occupation: Engineer

Mikalai Mikalayevich Labko (Belarusian: Мікалай Мікалаевіч Лабко; 5 May 1948 – 22 February 2024) was a Belarusian engineer and politician. A member of the Communist Party, he served in the Supreme Council of Belarus from 1990 to 1996.

Labko died on 22 February 2024, at the age of 75.
