= Choi Un-ji =

South Korean politician (1927–2024)

Member of the National Assembly of South Korea
- In office 11 April 1985 – 29 May 1996

Personal details
- Born: 17 January 1927
- Died: 11 February 2024 (aged 97)
- Party: DKP; DJP; DLP
- Education: Seoul National University
- Occupation: Businessman

Choi Un-ji (Korean: 최운지; 17 January 1927 – 11 February 2024) was a South Korean businessman and politician. A member of the Democratic Korea Party, the Democratic Justice Party, and the Democratic Liberal Party, he served in the National Assembly from 1985 to 1996.

Choi died on 11 February 2024, at the age of 97.
