= José María Rioboo =

Spanish academic and politician (1948–2024)

Member of the Congress of Deputies for A Coruña
- In office 8 July 1986 – 2 September 1989

Personal details
- Born: José María Rioboo Almanzor; 14 November 1948 Alcazarquivir, Spanish Morocco
- Died: 22 February 2024 (aged 75) Santiago de Compostela, Spain
- Party: CDS
- Education: University of Santiago de Compostela
- Occupation: Academic, politician

José María Rioboo Amanzor (14 November 1948 – 22 February 2024) was a Spanish academic and politician. A member of the Democratic and Social Centre, he served in the Congress of Deputies from 1986 to 1989.

Rioboo died in Santiago de Compostela on 22 February 2024, at the age of 75.
