= Annick Balley =

Beninese journalist and television presenter (1964–2024)

- Born: 1964
- Died: 14 February 2024 (aged 59–60); Paris, France
- Occupations: Journalist; Television presenter

Annick Balley (1964 – 14 February 2024) was a Beninese journalist and television presenter.

== Biography ==
Born in 1964, Balley became an editor for the Office de Radiodiffusion et Télévision du Bénin (ORTB), from where she resigned in 2010 and returned in 2016 as a program manager. From 2012 to 2015, she was a director at Maïsha TV, a pan-African television group based in Mali. She was project manager of DG/OTRB.

Annick Balley died following a long illness in Paris, France, on 14 February 2024.
