= Zbigniew Fedyczak =

Polish sports shooter (1952–2024)

Personal information
- Born: 26 August 1952 Zielona Góra, Poland
- Died: 16 February 2024 (aged 71)

Sport
- Sport: Sports shooting

Zbigniew Fedyczak (26 August 1952 – 16 February 2024) was a Polish sports shooter. He competed in two events at the 1972 Summer Olympics. Fedyczak died on 16 February 2024, at the age of 71.
