= Kent Campbell =

American physician (1944–2024)

- Born: Carlos Clinton Campbell III; January 9, 1944; Knoxville, Tennessee, U.S.
- Died: February 20, 2024 (aged 80)
- Education: Haverford College; Duke University; Harvard University
- Occupation: Physician

Carlos Clinton Campbell III (January 9, 1944 – February 20, 2024) was an American physician.

== Life and career ==
Campbell was born in Knoxville, Tennessee. He attended Haverford College, graduating in 1966. He also attended Duke University, earning his medical degree in 1970, and Harvard University, earning his master's degree in public health.

Campbell was a malaria branch chief at the Centers for Disease Control from 1981 to 1993.

Campbell died on February 20, 2024, at the age of 80.
