= Raffaele Delfino =

Italian politician (1931–2024)

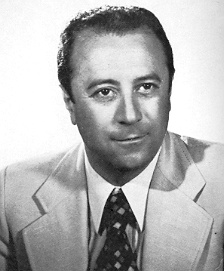
- Delfino in 1976

Member of the Chamber of Deputies of Italy for Abruzzo
- In office 12 June 1958 – 15 June 1979

Personal details
- Born: 12 March 1931 Pescara, Italy
- Died: 19 February 2024 (aged 92) Rome, Italy
- Party: MSI (1958–1977); DN (1977–1979)
- Education: Sapienza University of Rome
- Occupation: Journalist

Raffaele Delfino (12 March 1931 – 19 February 2024) was an Italian journalist and politician. A member of the Italian Social Movement and National Democracy, he served in the Chamber of Deputies from 1958 to 1979.

Delfino died in Rome on 19 February 2024, at the age of 92.
