= Elisabeth Djouka =

Cameroonian nationalist militant (died 2024)

- Died: 11 February 2024
- Occupation: Militant

Elisabeth Djouka (died 11 February 2024) was a Cameroonian nationalist militant. She was known for her incarceration in Bafoussam Prison and her mugshot captioned "outlaw".

== Biography ==
Djouka was originally from Bamendjou and took on arms training in Batié while she was only a teenager. She was nicknamed "la douce", or "the sweet one" because she cooked food for her fellow militants.

A committed nationalist, Djouka was a young bride and her family believed she had died following her first arrest. She was thrown into Bafoussam Prison and became famous from her mugshot, taken in February 1969. Several sources alleged that she suffered extensive sexual assault, rendering her infertile.

Elisabeth Djouka died on 11 February 2024. Her funeral was organised for 2 March 2024.
