= Valery Ataev =

Uzbek politician (1948–2024)

Minister of Energy and Electrification
- In office 1994–2000

Personal details
- Born: Valery Yuldashevich Ataev; 18 March 1948
- Died: 2 February 2024 (aged 75) Moscow, Russia
- Education: Tashkent State Technical University
- Occupation: Engineer

Valery Yuldashevich Ataev (Russian: Валерий Юлдашевич Атаев; 18 March 1948 – 2 February 2024) was an Uzbek engineer and politician. He served as Minister of Energy and Electrification from 1994 to 2000.

Ataev died in Moscow on 2 February 2024, at the age of 75.
