= Grace Joncas =

American politician

Member of New Hampshire House of Representatives

Personal details
- Born: December 22, 1923 Salmon Falls, Rollinsford, New Hampshire
- Died: February 1, 2024 (aged 100)

Grace L. Joncas (nee Senechal; December 22, 1923 – February 1, 2024) was an American politician. She was a member of the New Hampshire House of Representatives. Later in life she was a member of the select board and ran the Meals on Wheels Program in her hometown of Rollinsford, New Hampshire.
