= Raymond Gillespie =

Irish historian

Professor Raymond Gillespie MRIA
- Born: 8 November 1955; Belfast, Northern Ireland
- Died: 8 February 2024 (aged 68); Dublin, Ireland
- Occupations: historian and lecturer
- Spouse: Bernadette Cunningham

Academic background
- Thesis: East Ulster in the early seventeenth century: a colonial economy and society (1982)
- Doctoral advisor: Aidan Clarke

Raymond Gillespie (8 November 1955 – 8 February 2024) was an Irish historian, known for his work on local and early modern Irish history.

== Early life and education ==
Raymond Gillespie was born on 8 November 1955 in Belfast, Northern Ireland; son of Ernest and Annie Gillespie. His father was a cabinet maker who worked at the Harland & Wolff shipyard. Gillespie grew up in east Belfast and attended Rosetta Primary School, before going on to receive his secondary education at Annadale Grammar School.

Gillespie studied history at Queen's University Belfast, graduating with first-class honours, before going on to qualify as a secondary-school teacher. Gillespie became a Methodist lay preacher while an undergraduate.

He completed his PhD under the supervision of Aidan Clarke at Trinity College Dublin in 1982, examining the history of east Ulster in the early seventeenth century.

== Career ==
Gillespie spent seven years with the Department of Finance, before moving to the Office of Public Works from 1989 to 1991.

In 1991, Gillespie was appointed a lecturer in the Department of History at St Patrick's College, Maynooth (moved to NUI Maynooth in 1997). At Maynooth he initiated the Maynooth Studies in Local History series in 1995 (which he edited until 2020), and also established the Certificate, BA and MA courses in local history at the university. He was appointed professor of history at Maynooth University, and retired from there in 2021, being awarded the title of Professor Emeritus in January 2022.

Gillespie edited the Journal of the County Kildare Archaeological Society from 1992 to 2015. After stepping down as editor he was appointed assistant editor and was involved in another three journals. He was appointed to the editorial board of the Royal Irish Academy's Irish Historic Towns Atlas in 1994, and was its chairman from 2016 to 2021. He was elected a member of the Royal Irish Academy in 2001. He was a visiting fellow at All Souls College, Oxford, in 1996-1997 and was Parnell fellow at Magdalene College, Cambridge, in 2011–2012.

A Festschrift featuring 81 contributors, titled The Historian as Detective was published in his honour in 2021.

== Personal life ==
Gillespie married Bernadette Cunningham, whom he had met while they were both members of the Irish History Students' Association. Though Methodist, he married in a Catholic church.

== Death ==
Gillespie died on 8 February 2024 in the Mater Hospital, Dublin. He had an ecumenical funeral at the Catholic church in Corofin, County Clare, his wife's hometown.
