= Isabel Mijares =

Spanish oenologist (1942–2024)

- Born: 1942; Mérida, Spain
- Died: 10 February 2024 (aged 81); Madrid, Spain
- Occupation: Oenologist

María Isabel Mijares García-Pelayo (1942 – 10 February 2024) was a Spanish oenologist. She was considered the first woman in the profession and the first woman to run a winery in Spain.

== Early life and education ==
María Isabel Mijares was born in Mérida, where she had a "happy childhood" alongside her eight siblings. Her father's family were of Leonese origin, and ran a home winery, through which she was introduced to winemaking.

Mijares began studying chemistry at Universidad Complutense, but put her degree on hold. In 1967 she began studying oenology at the Institute of Oenology of the University of Bordeaux in France after receiving a scholarship from the French government. While there, she met Émile Peynaud, who became her mentor. In 1970, she completed her doctorate in oenology at the institute.

== Career ==
Mijares ran Palacio de Arganza, a winery in Villafranca del Bierzo.

From 1982 until 1987, Mijares chaired the Valdepeñas Regulatory Council, the first woman to do so. In 1985 she joined the Royal Academy of Gastronomy as a viticulture expert.

From 1998 until 2019, Mijares served as the coordinator and director of the Camps Guide to the Best Wines in Spain.

Beginning in 2017, Mijares served as technical director of wine activities for the Real Casino of Madrid.

== Death ==
Mijares died of a heart attack in Madrid, on 10 February 2024, at the age of 81.

== Books ==
- Curso de vinos latinoamericanos y Curso de vinos españoles, 1992, in collaboration with José Antonio Sáez Illobre.
- El vino, de la cepa a la copa (in Spanish) (4 ed.). Ediciones Mundi-Prensa. 2007. ISBN 978-84-8476-318-5. (with José Antonio Sáez Illobr, first published in 1995e)
- Colección de Guías de vinos y bodegas. 1996, Editorial El País-Aguilar in collaboration with José Antonio Sáez Illobre.
