= Garry Tee =

New Zealand mathematician and academic (1932–2024)

- Occupations: Professor (Emeritus), Department of Mathematics and Computer Science
- Awards: Honorary Doctorate, Auckland University of Technology (2003)

Academic background
- Education: Seddon Memorial Technical College, The University of Auckland

Academic work
- Discipline: Mathematics and Computer Science
- Sub-discipline: History of Science
- Institutions: The University of Auckland

Garry John Tee (28 March 1932 – 18 February 2024) was a New Zealand mathematician and computer scientist.

== Biography ==
Garry John Tee was born in Whanganui on 28 March 1932. Tee attended Seddon Memorial Technical College (now Auckland University of Technology). In 1954, he was awarded a Master of Science with First Class Honours at the Auckland University College (now the University of Auckland). Following graduating, Tee worked as a computer in Australia for an oil prospecting team.

In 1958, Tee was a mathematician at the English Electric Company, contributing to the programming of the DEUCE computer. In 1964, Tee helped establish the Department of Mathematics at the University of Lancaster and spent 1965 as a visiting scholar at the Department of Computer Science, Stanford University. By 1968, Tee had returned to the Department of Mathematics at the University of Auckland, playing a key role in founding its Department of Computer Science. Starting in 1969, Tee was also an active member of the Auckland University Underwater Club.

In 1971, Tee pursued further studies under Richard Bellman at the University of Southern California. However, Bellman's illness and subsequent death led Tee to return to Auckland without completing his doctorate. In 2003, Tee received an honorary doctorate from the Auckland University of Technology.

Tee died in Auckland on 18 February 2024.

== Publications ==
Tee published widely on numerical analysis, Charles Babbage, early women in mathematics and computing, and history of mathematics, computer science, and science more broadly. Publications include:

- Tee, Garry J. "A novel finite-difference approximation to the biharmonic operator." The Computer Journal 6, no. 2 (1963): 177–192.
- Tee, Garry J. "Evidence for the Chinese Origin of the Jaguar Motif in Chavin Art". Asian Perspectives 21, no. 1 (1978): 27–29.
- Tee, Garry J. "The Heritage of Charles Babbage in Australasia." Annals of the History of Computing 5, no. 1 (1983): 45–60.
- Tee, Garry J. "A Calendar of the Correspondence of Charles Darwin, 1821–1882." Journal of the Royal Society of New Zealand 15, no. 3 (1985): 341–343.
- Tee, Garry J. "Mathematics in the Pacific Basin". The British Journal for the History of Science 21, no. 4 (1988): 401–417.
- Tee, Garry J. "A Note on Bechmann's Approximate Construction of π, Suggested by a Deleted Sketch in Villard de Honnecourt's Manuscript." The British Journal for the History of Science 22, no. 2 (1989): 241–242.
- Tee, Garry J. "Prime powers of zeros of monic polynomials with integer coefficients." The Fibonacci Quarterly 32, no. 3 (1994): 277–283.
- Tee, Garry J. "Relics of Davy and Faraday in New Zealand". Notes and Records of the Royal Society of London 52, no. 1 (1998): 93–102.
- Tee, Garry J. "Math Bite: Further Generalizations of a Curiosity That Feynman Remembered All His Life." Mathematics Magazine 72, no. 1 (1999): 44.
- Tee, Garry J. "Eigenvectors of block circulant and alternating circulant matrices." New Zealand Journal of Mathematics 36, no. 8 (2007): 195–211.
