= Rolf Selzer =

German journalist and politician (1942–2024)

Member of the Landtag of Schleswig-Holstein
- In office 12 April 1983 – 23 April 1996
- Constituency: Kiel-West (1983–1992); Party list (1992–1996)

Personal details
- Born: 5 December 1942 Hochheim am Main, Gau Hesse-Nassau, Germany
- Died: 12 February 2024 (aged 81)
- Party: SPD
- Occupation: Journalist

Rolf Selzer (5 December 1942 – 12 February 2024) was a German journalist and politician. A member of the Social Democratic Party, he served in the Landtag of Schleswig-Holstein from 1983 to 1996.

Selzer died on 12 February 2024, at the age of 81.
