= Muhammad Salih Haydara =

Yemeni writer (1952–2024)

Muhammad Salih Haydara (1952 – 14 February 2024) was a Yemeni journalist and short story writer from southern Yemen. He was raised in Aden and studied communication at Cairo University. He has published several volumes of short stories including his debut collection A Wanderer from Yemen (1974), Very Much an Adolescent (1978) and Migrating Clouds (1980). His story, "The Imprint of Blackness" (translated by Lorne Kenny and Thomas Ezzy), has appeared in two English-language anthologies, namely The Literature of Modern Arabia (1988) and Between the Lines: International Short Stories of War (1994). Haydara died in a traffic collision in Sanaa on 14 February 2024.
