= Gunild Lattmann-Kretschmer =

German intendant and politician (1936–2024)

Gunild Lattman-Kretschmer

Member of the Landtag of Saxony
- In office 1994–2004

Personal details
- Born: Gunild Lattman; 24 July 1936 Potsdam, Gau Electoral March, Germany
- Died: 10 February 2024 (aged 87)
- Party: PDS
- Education: Theaterhochschule Leipzig
- Occupation: Intendant

Gunild Lattman-Kretschmer (24 July 1936 – 10 February 2024) was a German intendant and politician. A member of the Party of Democratic Socialism, she served in the Landtag of Saxony from 1994 to 2004.

Lattman-Kretschmer died on 10 February 2024, at the age of 87.
