= Thomas W. Bennett (Georgia politician) =

American politician (1936–2024)

Member of the Georgia House of Representatives
- In office 1971–1972

Personal details
- Born: March 21, 1936 Pulaski County, Georgia, U.S.
- Died: February 10, 2024 (aged 87)
- Party: Democratic
- Education: Mercer University; University of Georgia

Thomas Wesley Bennett (March 21, 1936 – February 10, 2024) was an American politician who served as a Democratic member of the Georgia House of Representatives.

== Life and career ==
Thomas Wesley Bennett was born in Pulaski County, Georgia, on March 21, 1936. He attended Mercer University and the University of Georgia.

Bennett served in the Georgia House of Representatives from 1971 to 1972.\

Bennett died on February 10, 2024, at the age of 87.
