= José Alberto Tejada =

Colombian accountant, journalist and politician (1957–2024)

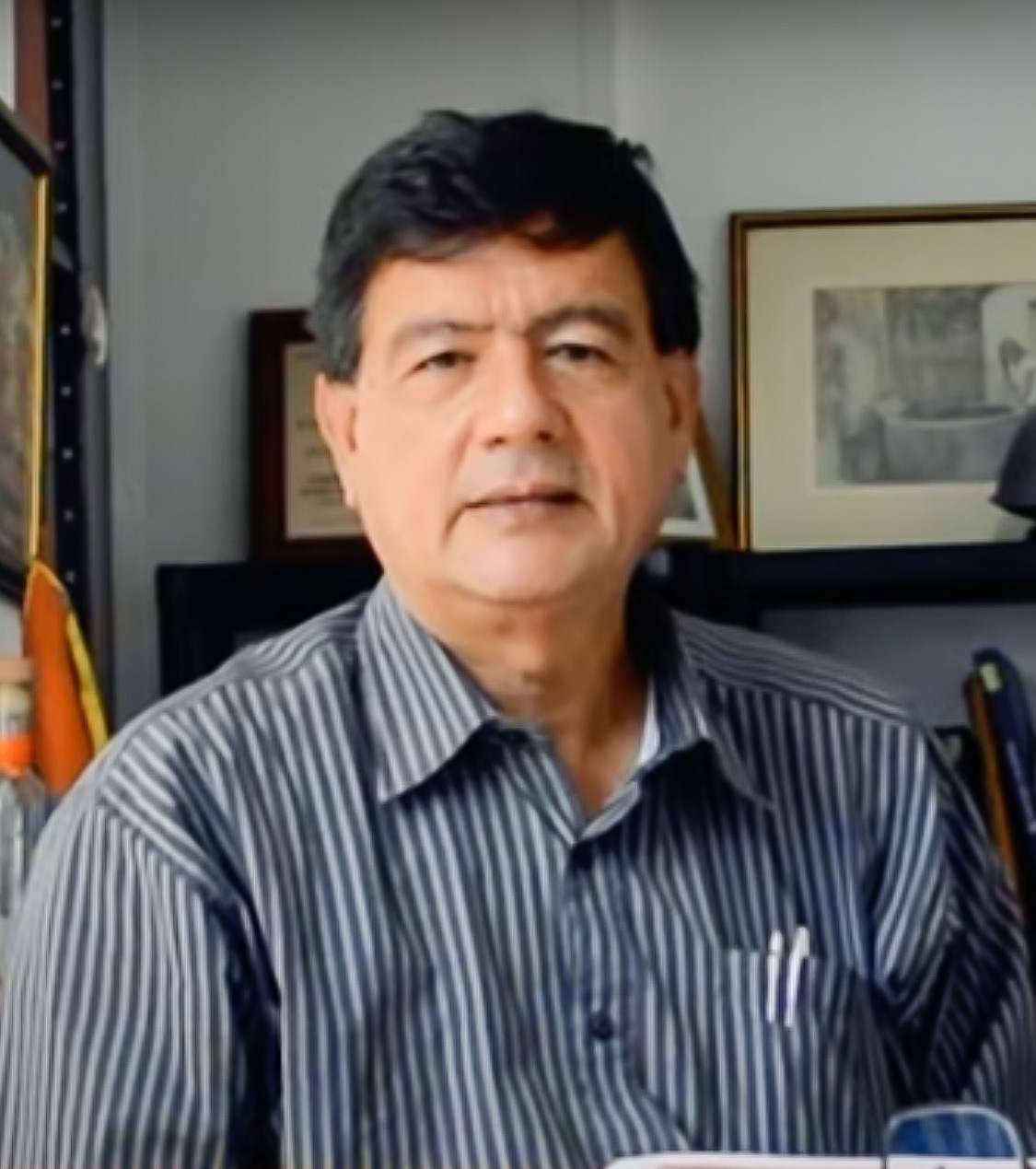

Member of the Chamber of Representatives
- In office 20 July 2022 – 28 February 2024

Personal details
- Born: José Alberto Tejada Echeverri; 7 June 1957 Cali, Colombia
- Died: 28 February 2024 (aged 66) Cali, Colombia
- Occupation: Accountant; journalist; politician

José Alberto Tejada Echeverri (7 June 1957 – 28 February 2024) was a Colombian journalist, politician and accountant. He was recognized for covering the 2021 Colombian protests. Tejada was elected to the Chamber of Representatives in the 2022 legislative election within the coalition of the Historical Pact for Colombia.

== Biography ==
Born in Cali, Tejada completed his primary studies at the Marco Fidel Suárez school, graduated as a high school student in 1976 from the San Juan Bosco Industrial Technical Institute, and graduated as a public accountant from the University of San Buenaventura in 1986; in 1990 he completed his master's degree in adult education from the same university. He completed a Specialization in Senior Management at the ICESI University in 1997 and a Specialization in International Economics and Foreign Trade at the University of Barcelona in 1999, among other studies. He has been an accountant in several entities such as the Banco Central Hipotecario and has worked as a university professor.

Tejada became known as a journalist and director of Channel 2 of Cali, of the Daniel Gillard Civic Corporation (CECAN), with the coverage of the protests in Colombia in 2021. Threats were reported against him. Therefore, which received precautionary measures from the Inter-American Commission on Human Rights to the reporters José Alberto Tejada and Jhonatan Buitrago, They also received the Orlando Sierra Award for journalistic courage.

In recognition of his activity, several popular sectors of Valle del Cauca proposed him as a candidate for the Chamber of Representatives, supporting his candidacy and being elected for it by the Historical Pact in the 2022 legislative elections.

== Death ==
Tejada died on 28 February 2024, at the age of 66.
