= Stanislas Spero Adotevi =

Beninese politician (1934–2024)

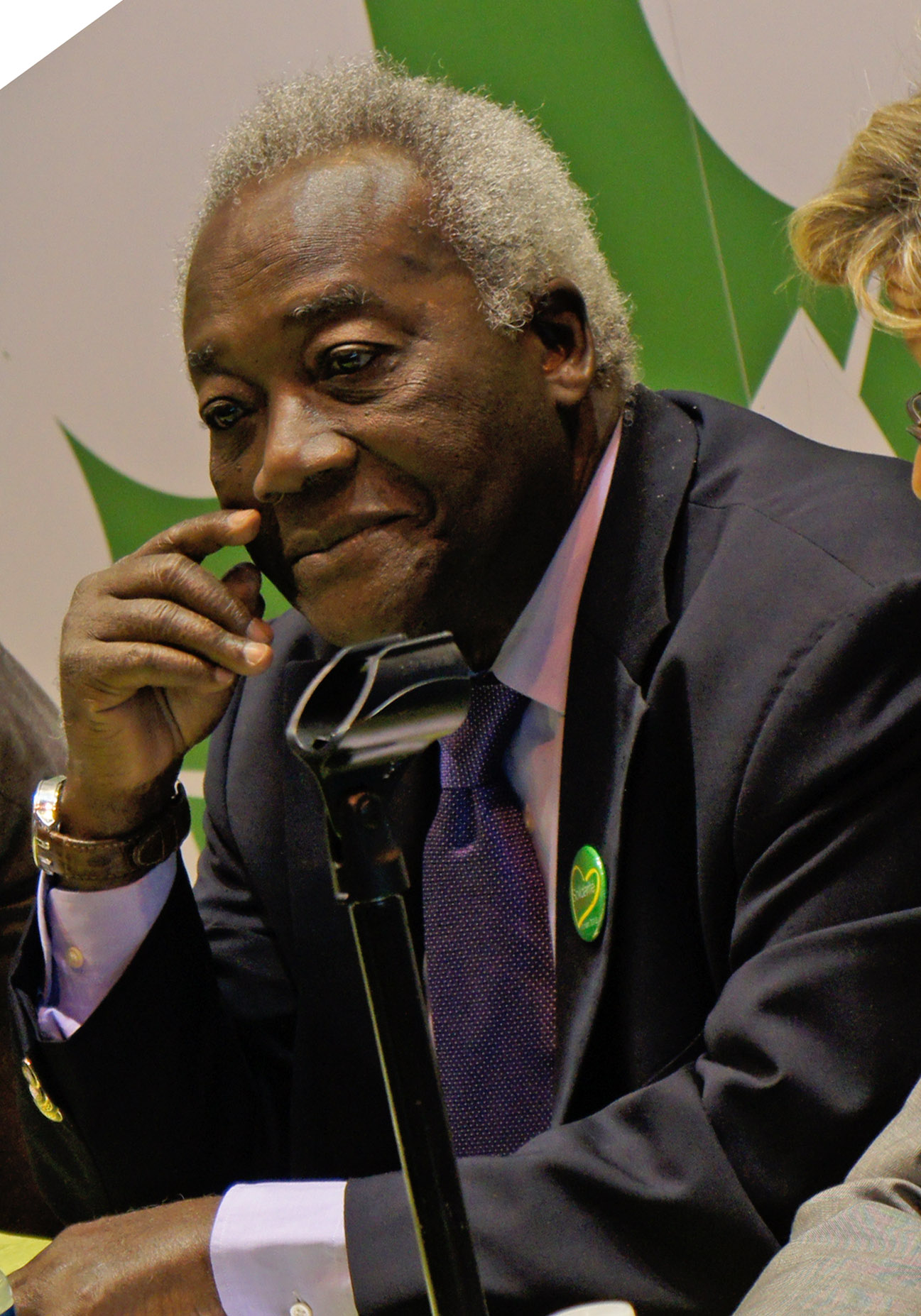
Adotevi in 2012

Stanislas Spero Adotevi (4 February 1934 Lomé – 7 February 2024) was a Beninese politician, civil servant and UNICEF official. He served in Benin's government as Minister of Information in 1963 and as Minister of Culture between 1965 and 1968. He was later Director of the Institute of Applied Research and Director of the National Archives and Museums. In 1981 he was appointed UNICEF Representative in the Republic of Upper Volta (Burkina Faso) and in 1987 he became the UNICEF Regional Director for West and Central Africa, directing UNICEF's work in 23 African countries. In 1995 he was appointed Special Advisor to UNICEF Executive Director Carol Bellamy. Adotevi died on 7 February 2024, three days after his 90th birthday.
