= Vincenzo Ruggiero =

British sociologist (1950–2024)

Vincenzo Ruggiero (8 February 1950 – 2 February 2024) was an Italian-born sociologist who was Professor of Sociology at Middlesex University, London. He was also director of the Centre for Social and Criminological Research at Middlesex University. He died in London on 3 February 2024, at the age of 73. He is survived by his partner of 33 years, Cynthia, and daughter, Lucia.

== Research ==
Ruggiero conducted research on behalf of the ESRC (Economic and Social Research Council), the British Home Office, the European Commission and the United Nations.

Ruggiero worked on; penal systems, organised and corporate crime, state crimes and the crimes of the powerful, and also on sociological and urban issues, social movements, political violence and war.

== Publications ==
Ruggiero published extensively in international academic journals, and his books include: Western European Penal Systems (1995), Eurodrugs (1995), Organised and Corporate Crime in Europe (1996), The New European Criminology (1998), Crime and Markets (2000), Movements in the City (2001), Economic and Financial Crime in Europe (2002), Crime in Literature (2003), The Crimes of the Economy (2013), London: Routledge, Punishment in Europe (2013) (with M. Ryan), London: Palgrave/Macmillan, I crimini dell'economia (2013), Milan: Feltrinelli, Power and Crime (2015), London and New York: Routledge, Perché i potenti delinquono (2015), Milan: Feltrinelli; Dirty Money: On Financial Delinquency (2017), Oxford: Oxford University Press; 'Organised Crime and Terrorist Networks' (ed) (2020), London and New York: Routledge and 'Visions of Political Violence' (2020), London and New York: Routledge. The latter book was published in Italian as 'Violenza politica. Visioni e immaginari' (2021), Rome: DeriveApprodi.

In 2021, Vincenzo Ruggiero published 'Critical Criminology Today: Counter-Hegemonic Essays', London and New York: Routledge.

== Recognition and prizes ==
Ruggiero won the American Society of Criminology Lifetime Achievement Award in 2016 for his outstanding contribution to the field of criminology.

Ruggiero was nominated as Distinguished International Academic by the American Society of Criminology (2000), received the Premio Nazionale G. Arena for the book Movements in the City (2002), and was nominated for the Hindelang Award by the American Society of Criminology for the book Crime in Literature (2004). In 2016 he was given the Lifetime Achievement Award by the American Society of Criminology (Division on Critical Criminology) for his contribution to critical thought in criminology.

The following are comments about two of Ruggiero's later books. On Power and Crime:

"A penetrating, passionate and profound critical analysis on the intimate inter-relations of crime and power. Whilst the everyday criminal 'justice'| process and the sadistic scapegoating of the popular media continue to demonise the deviance of the powerless, in the wake of the financial crisis and proliferating elite scandals this smokescreen is ever harder to maintain. Ruggiero marshals his considerable learning in many fields - philosophy, social and political theory, economics, literature, as well as conventional criminology - to demonstrate that contrary to the obfuscations of official statistics and the mass media, crime in the broadest sense is the twin of power. The book is an impressive illumination of vital issues, from one of the most sophisticated and erudite contemporary criminological theorists" (Robert Reiner, Emeritus Professor of Criminology, London School of Economics, UK).

On Visions of Political Violence:

"'With typical panache and erudition, Vincenzo Ruggiero offers an unusual and original take on political violence. Drawing on philosophy and political science, his analysis ranges over territory that incorporates systemic and institutional violence, riot, terrorism and war. Within political violence Ruggiero finds the source of many of the greatest dangers we face as well as the potential for emancipation and liberation" (Tim Newburn, Professor of Criminology and Social Policy, London School of Economics, UK).

On 'Critical Criminology Today'

These essays offer a distinctive and powerful agenda for an alternative and critical criminology. This is a criminology for the public sphere positing alliances with sites of resistance to, and the contestation of, power. It is a powerful, erudite, and passionate read. Here, Vincenzo Ruggiero is at his elegant and most compelling best.

Sandra Walklate, Eleanor Rathbone Chair of Sociology (Liverpool) Conjoint Chair of Criminology (Monash)

This well written, researched, thoughtful and engaging book, written by one of the most interesting scholars in the field of Criminology and Criminal Justice, forces the reader to consider rarely addressed alternative perspectives in the field of Critical Criminology.

Jeffrey Ian Ross, Ph.D., University of Baltimore

In 2019 Ruggiero received the Outstanding Book Award given by the American Society of Criminology Division of White Collar and Corporate Crime for his book Dirty Money: On Financial Delinquency (Oxford University Press, 2017).
