= Peter Jarolin =

Austrian music and drama critic (1971–2024)

Peter Jarolin (1971 – February 2024) was an Austrian music and drama critic who wrote predominantly about opera and theater in Vienna. He wrote for the daily newspaper, Kurier.

== Life ==
=== Studies and professional beginnings ===
Jarolin grew up in Vienna. After studying law at the University of Vienna, Jarolin became a music and drama critic for the Viennese daily Kurier in 1996; he later became an editor at the Kurier, as well.

== Writing ==
Jarolin published several articles in the Vienna State Opera's Prolog magazine, and in the Zeitschrift der Gesellschaft der Musikfreunde, published by the Haydn Festival Eisenstadt. He had also held introductory lectures before performances and moderated interviews, for example at the Vienna Musikverein, the ImPulsTanz Festival, and the Grafenegg Music Festival.

His reviews of classical pieces were praised in the Shakespeare Jahrbuch. Burgtheater actor Peter Matic, in his autobiography, cites reviews by Jarolin. International theater scholars cited Jarolin's reviews.

== Death ==
Jarolin died in February 2024, at the age of 52. The Kurier's obituary spoke of "demons" in Jarolin's personal life, and stated: "He never recovered from a health emergency in January." Gert Korentschnig, head of the paper's arts section, wrote that "He is irreplaceable, in every respect," in a personal obituary in the Kurier.
