= Richard Stolarski =

American scientist (1941–2024)

Richard Stanley Stolarski
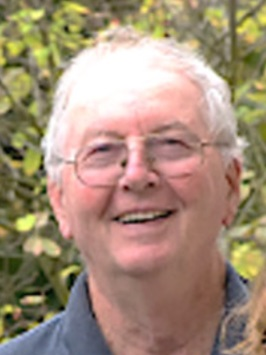
- Stolarski in 2017
- Born: November 22, 1941
- Died: February 22, 2024 (aged 82)
- Education: University of Puget Sound; University of Florida
- Known for: Ozone depletion research
- Awards: U.S. Environmental Protection Agency Stratospheric Ozone Protection Award, United Nations Environment Programme Global Ozone Award, NASA Exceptional Achievement Medal, NASA Robert H. Goddard Award of Merit
- Scientific career
- Fields: Physics

Richard Stanley Stolarski (November 22, 1941 – February 22, 2024) was an American atmospheric scientist. He played a critical role in the discovery of the ozone hole.

== Early life and education ==
Stolarski was originally from Tacoma, Washington, the son of Stanley and Rose Stolarski. He obtained his bachelor's degree in physics and mathematics from the University of Puget Sound in 1963 and his Ph.D. in physics from the University of Florida in 1966.

== Career and research ==
With Ralph Cicerone, he identified the role of chlorine in ozone depletion.

Stolarski was at NASA's Goddard Space Flight Center for 30 years. At NASA he was involved in satellite measurements of ozone (first with the TOMS, Total Ozone Mapping Spectrometer, on the Nimbus 7 satellite). In 1986 they confirmed observations of an ozone hole in spring over Antarctica by Farmer, Gardiner and Shanklin of the British Antarctic Survey from 1985.

In 2010, he became a research professor in the Morton K. Blaustein Department of Earth and Planetary Science, Johns Hopkins University.

== Death ==
Stolarski died on February 22, 2024, at the age of 82.
