= István Orosz (politician) =

Hungarian politician (1935–2024)

Member of the National Assembly of Hungary
- In office 28 June 1994 – 17 June 1998
- Constituency: Individual Constituency Hajdú-Bihar County No. 3

Personal details
- Born: 16 July 1935 Mád, Hungary
- Died: 11 February 2024 (aged 88)
- Party: MSZP
- Education: University of Debrecen
- Occupation: Historian

István Orosz (16 July 1935 – 11 February 2024) was a Hungarian historian and politician. A member of the Hungarian Socialist Party, he served in the National Assembly from 1994 to 1998.

Orosz died on 11 February 2024, at the age of 88.
