= Jeannot Schaul =

Luxembourgish footballer (1948–2024)

Personal information
- Date of birth: 22 October 1948
- Date of death: 1 February 2024 (aged 75)
- Position: Defender

Senior career*
Years	Team	Apps	(Gls)
1969–1979	Jeunesse Esch		

International career
1976	Luxembourg	3	(0)
- * Club domestic league appearances and goals

Jeannot Schaul (22 October 1948 – 1 February 2024) was a Luxembourgish footballer who played as a defender. He died on 1 February 2024, at the age of 75.
