= Klaus Dick =

German Roman Catholic prelate (1932–2024)

- Auxiliary Bishop Emeritus of Cologne
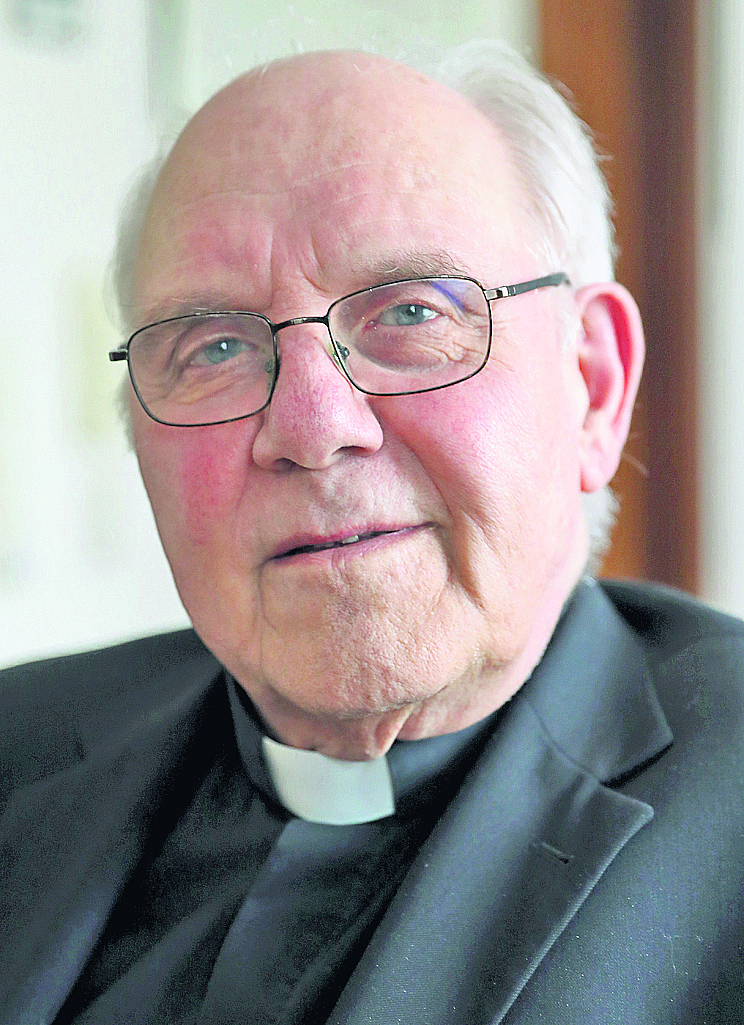
- Dick in 2018
- Appointed: 17 March 1975
- Term ended: 24 February 2003
- Other post: Titular Bishop of Guzabeta (1975–2024)

Orders
- Ordination: 24 February 1953
- Consecration: 19 May 1975 by Joseph Höffner

Personal details
- Born: 27 February 1928 Cologne, Rhine Province, Prussia, Germany
- Died: 25 February 2024 (aged 95) Cologne, North Rhine-Westphalia, Germany
- Motto: Obsecramus pro Christo
- Coat of arms

Klaus Dick (27 February 1928 – 25 February 2024) was a German Roman Catholic prelate. He served as the auxiliary bishop of the Roman Catholic Archdiocese of Cologne from 1975 to 2003. He died in Cologne on 25 February 2024, at the age of 95.

Catholic Church titles
Preceded by —	Auxiliary Bishop of Cologne; 1975–2003	Succeeded by —
Preceded by Flaviano Barrechea Ariola	Titular Bishop of Guzabeta; 1975–2024	Succeeded by Vacant
