= Melis Abzalov =

- Мелис Абзалов
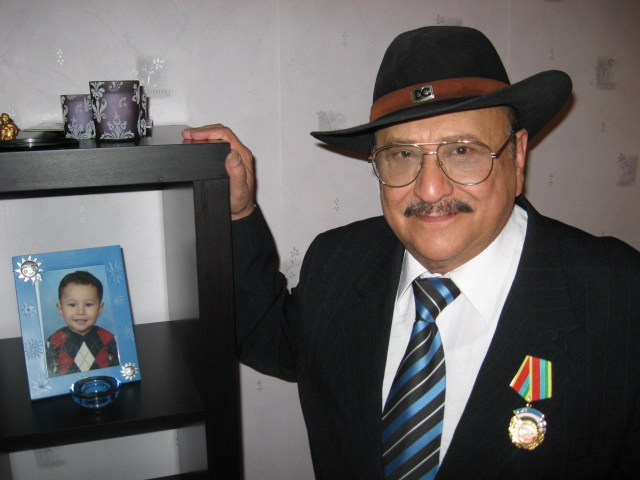
- Melis Abzalov in 2009
- Born: Melis Oripovich Abzalov; November 18, 1938; Yangiyul, Uzbek SSR, USSR
- Died: October 26, 2016 (aged 77); Stockholm, Sweden
- Occupations: actor, film director, screenwriter, and film producer
- Awards: Honored Artist of the Uzbek SSR (1987); Order "Mehnat Shuhrati" (2008)

Melis Abzalov (Uzbek: Melis Abzalov, Мелис Абзалов; November 18, 1938 – October 26, 2016) was an Uzbek actor, film director, screenwriter, and film producer. His most famous films include Suyunchi (1982), Kelinlar qoʻzgʻoloni (1984), Armon (1986), and Oʻtgan kunlar (1969).

Abzalov is celebrated as one of the founders and prominent members of the Uzbek film making industry. During his lifetime, he received many honorary titles and awards, including the title Honored Artist of the Uzbek SSR (1987).

== Life and work ==
Melis Oripovich Abzalov was born on November 18, 1938, in Yangiyul, then the Uzbek SSR. He graduated from the Ostrovsky Tashkent Theatre Arts Institute in 1961. A year later, in 1962, he started working at Uzbekfilm. He died on October 26, 2016, in Stockholm.

== Filmography ==
=== As director ===
- Chinor tagidagi duel (Russian: Дуэль под чинарой) (The Duel under a Plane Tree) (1979)
- Suyunchi (Russian: Бабушка-генерал) (1982)
- Kelinlar qoʻzgʻoloni (Russian: Бунт невесток) (The Rebellion of the Brides) (1985)
- Armon (Russian: Уходя, остаются) (Sorrow) (1986)
- Maysaraning ishi (Russian: Восточная плутовка) (The Case of Maysara) (1989)
- Oʻtgan kunlar (Russian: Минувшие дни) (Days Gone By) (1997)
- Chimildiq (1999)
- Meshpolvon (2000)
- Baribir hayot goʻzal (Russian: Жизнь прекрасна или киллер поневоле) (After All, Life is Good) (2004)
- Sirli sirtmoq (The Secret Trap) (2008)
- Taʼziyadagi toʻy (Russian: Свадьба на поминках) (The Wedding at a Funeral) (2010)

=== As actor ===
- Laylak keldi, yoz boʻldi (Russian: Белые, белые аисты) (White Storks) (1966) (not credited)
- Влюбленные (The Lovers) (1969)
- Седьмая пуля (The Seventh Bullet) (1972)
- Встречи и расставания (Meetings and Partings) (1973)
- Поклонник (The Worshiper) (1973)
- Ты, песня моя (You, My Song) (1975)
- Inson qushlar ortidan boradi (Russian: Человек уходит за птицами) (Man is after the Birds) (1975)
- Далекие близкие годы (Far, Near Years) (1976)
- Птицы наших надежд (The Birds of Our Hopes) (1976)
- Седьмой джинн (The Seventh Genie) (1976)
- Буйный «Лебедь» (The Wild "Swan") (1977)
- Qoʻqon voqeasi (Russian: Это было в Коканде) (This Happened in Kokand) (1977)
- Olovli yoʻllar (Russian: Огненные дороги) (The Fiery Roads) (1978) (series)
- Любовь моя — революция (My Love — Revolution) (1981)
- Встреча у высоких снегов (The Meeting at High Snow Mountains) (1982)
- Новые приключения Акмаля (The New Adventures of Akmal) (1983) (not credited)
- Уроки на завтра (Lessons for Tomorrow) (1983)
- Прощай, зелень лета... (Good-Bye, Summer) (1985) (not credited)
- Я тебя помню (I Remember You) (1985)
- Armon (Russian: Уходя, остаются) (Sorrow) (1986)
- Kлиника (The Clinic) (1987)
- Приключения Арслана (The Adventures of Arslan) (1988)
- Чудовище или кто-то другой (A Monster or Somebody Else) (1988)
- Maysaraning ishi (Russian: Восточная плутовка) (The Case of Maysara) (1989)
- Кодекс молчания (The Code of Silence) (1989)
- Шок (Shock) (1989)
- La Batalla de los Tres Reyes (Russian: Битва трех королей) (Battle of the Three Kings) (1990)
- Tangalik bolalar (Russian: Мальчики из Танги) (1990) (not credited)
- Ангел в огне (The Angel on Fire) (1992)
- Маклер (The Broker) (1992)
- Shaytanat (Russian: Шайтанат — царство бесов) (1998)
- Alpomish (Russian: Алпомыш) (2000)
- Дронго (The Drongo) (2002)
- Синедиктум (Cinedictum) (2002)
- Devona (Russian: Влюбленный) (2004)
- Baribir hayot goʻzal (Russian: Жизнь прекрасна или киллер поневоле) (After All, Life is Good) (2004)
- Vatan (Fatherland) (2006)
- Ходжа Насреддин: Игра начинается (Hodja Nasreddin: The Game Starts) (2006)
- Застава (The Outpost) (2007) (TV series)
- Tilla buva (Russian: Золотой дедушка) (Golden Grandpa) (2011)

=== As screenwriter ===
- Oʻtgan kunlar (Russian: Минувшие дни) (Days Gone By) (1997)

== Awards ==
Abzalov is celebrated as one of the founders of the Uzbek film making industry. He received many honorary titles and awards throughout his career, including the title Meritorious Artist of Uzbekistan (1987). In 2008, he received a Shuhrat Order.
