= Symphony for Strings =

1940 symphony by Georgy Sviridov

- by Georgy Sviridov
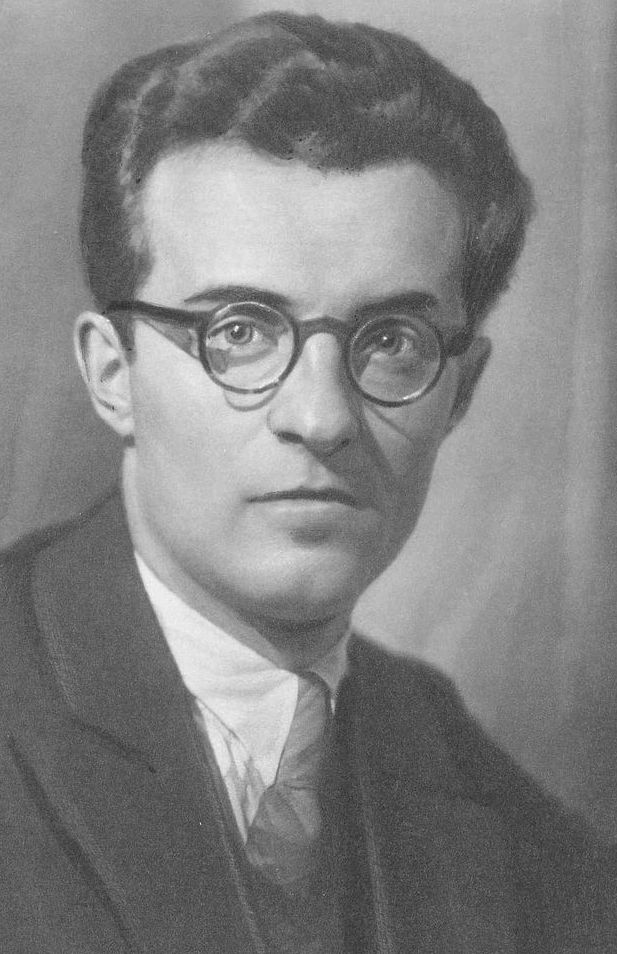
- Sviridov c. 1939
- Other name: Chamber Symphony
- Opus: 14
- Composed: 1940
- Publisher: Ruslania
- Duration: c. 20 minutes
- Movements: 4

Premiere
- Date: December 28, 1940
- Location: Large Hall of the Leningrad Philharmonia; Leningrad, Russian SFSR
- Performers: Leningrad Philharmonic Orchestra; Eduard Grikurov (conductor)

The Symphony for Strings (Russian: Симфония для струнного оркестра, romanized: Simfoniya dlya strunnogo orkestra, lit. 'Symphony for String Orchestra'; also known as the Chamber Symphony), Op. 14 is a four-movement composition for string orchestra by Georgy Sviridov. He composed the work during a period of creative crisis, when he began to reject the works of Igor Stravinsky and Dmitri Shostakovich, and struggled to develop his own style. The work was premiered on December 28, 1940, by the Leningrad Philharmonic Orchestra conducted by Eduard Grikurov. The work immediately engendered intense debate, against and in defense of Sviridov, among members of the Union of Soviet Composers. After 1943, the Symphony for Strings was not performed again until the composer rediscovered the score among his personal papers in the 1980s, after which he unsuccessfully attempted to revise it. Its first modern performance occurred on June 28, 2000, in Saint Petersburg, with the Moscow Soloists conducted by Yuri Bashmet.

== Background ==
Sviridov began to establish his reputation as a composer in 1936 with his settings of verses by Alexander Pushkin. The following year, in 1937, he was accepted into the Union of Soviet Composers—a rare achievement for a young composer of his time. That same year, he performed in the world premiere of his Piano Concerto, partnered by the Leningrad Philharmonic Orchestra conducted by Yevgeny Mravinsky. A number of his works, including his score to the film Virgin Soil Upturned and collaborations with Ivan Dzerzhinsky, became instantly popular in the Soviet Union. As his music became more widely known, it also drew increasing criticism from his peers. In personal jottings set down in the 1970s, Sviridov recalled the period as one fraught with challenges for himself and the emergence of the new Soviet music.

By 1940, during his last year of tutelage under Shostakovich, Sviridov confronted a major creative crisis. What he referred to as "state art", such as the operas Into the Storm by Tikhon Khrennikov and Semyon Kotko by Sergei Prokofiev repulsed him because of what he perceived as their essential falsity. At the same time, Sviridov increasingly felt estranged from the music of Igor Stravinsky—whose Perséphone, Symphony of Psalms, and Jeu de cartes he knew well—and Dmitri Shostakovich.

In 1940, Sviridov began and completed his Symphony for Strings. Sviridov's use of a string orchestra was considered unusual for a Soviet symphony of the period. The only previous example of such a work had been the Sinfonietta by Nikolai Myaskovsky.

== Music ==
The symphony consists of four movements:

1. Moderato assai
2. Vivace
3. Andante con moto
4. Allegro molto

The opening movement begins with a tutti statement of a dramatic theme, followed by a contrasting lyrical second subject. Jewish folk motifs are evoked in the succeeding scherzo. An austere and broadly melodic "Andante con moto" gives way to a finale of a determined character that resolves the tension of the earlier movements. According to the musicologist Yulian Weinkop, the work is influenced by Gustav Mahler's Symphony No. 7, Stravinsky's Oedipus Rex and Apollon musagète, and Shostakovich's Symphony No. 5.

A typical performance takes approximately 20 minutes.

== Premiere ==
The world premiere of the Symphony for Strings occurred on December 28, 1940, during a retrospective of Soviet music held in the Large Hall of the Leningrad Philharmonia. It was played by the Leningrad Philharmonic Orchestra conducted by Eduard Grikurov.

== Reception ==
=== Debate ===
In an article published prior to the premiere of the Symphony for Strings, Shostakovich called it an "interesting and very significant work". He added that "the originality and freshness of [Sviridov's] melodies, his harmonies and polyphonic sophistication are beyond question". Shostakovich's article was the only one he ever devoted to one of his students. After Sviridov played the symphony during a plenum of organizing committee of the Union of Soviet Composers on May 11, 1941, Shostakovich called him the hope of Soviet music.

Sviridov's Symphony for Strings provoked intense debates not only among musical professionals, but also with audiences. Weinkop noted that these disputes resulted from the abrupt shift in style and complexity evinced in the work:

This work doubtlessly needs a certain investment of intellectual energy to be appreciated: in it Sviridov leaves behind the primal "accessibility" of his youthful creative endeavors. This will possibly upset some critics, who may be inclined to hear in the symphony of this young composer a "formalistic fall from grace".

Ivan Sollertinsky, a musicologist and close friend of Shostakovich, attacked Sviridov and other young Leningrad composers as "epigones" of Shostakovich, who was himself criticized as being the "lord of the minds" of his students. Alexander Shaverdyan, a critic and editor, dubbed the phenomenon "Shostakovichism". Others, such as the musicologist Daniel Zhitomirsky and composer Boris Klyuzner, defended Shostakovich's pupils, including Sviridov. Klyuzner admonished Sviridov's critics for their accusations of imitativeness. He told them that careful listening would be enough to disabuse them of their beliefs. The Symphony for Strings was influenced not just by Shostakovich, Klyuzner added, but also by Stravinsky and Mahler, albeit incorporated into Sviridov's personal style.

=== Loss and rediscovery ===
After 1943, when the Symphony for Strings was conducted in Novosibirsk by Kurt Sanderling, the work was dropped from the repertoire. Sviridov's development as a composer eventually led him away from instrumental music, but he did not disown the score. He rediscovered it among his personal papers during the 1980s and attempted to prepare a revised version augmented with percussion. In the end, he was able to only revise the third movement, but left written indications for how he projected to revise the rest of the work. The Symphony for Strings was not played again until the Moscow Soloists conducted by Yuri Bashmet played it on June 28, 2000. That performance took place at the same site of the score's world premiere, now renamed the Saint Petersburg Academic Philharmonia.

The Moscow Soloists and Bashmet subsequently made the premiere recording of the Symphony for Strings for Onyx Classics. David Fanning, a British musicologist, wrote that it is a "serious and intelligent work, its moods wiry and intense almost throughout".

The Symphony for Strings was published in 2016 by Ruslania.
