= Yoʻldosh Aʼzamov =

- Йўлдош Аъзамов
- Born: May 10, 1909; Tashkent, Russian Turkestan, Russian Empire
- Died: June 16, 1985 (aged 76); Tashkent, Uzbek SSR, Soviet Union
- Occupation(s): Actor, film director, playwright, screenwriter, film producer
- Awards: Meritorious Artist of the Uzbek SSR (1965); State Hamza Prize (1970); People's Artist of the Uzbek SSR (1970); People's Artist of the USSR (1979)

Yoʻldosh Aʼzamov (Note: Uzbek: Yoʻldosh Aʼzamov, Йўлдош Аъзамов; Russian: Юлдаш Агзамов, romanized: Yuldash Agzamov) (May 10, 1909 – June 16, 1985) was an Uzbek actor, film director, playwright, screenwriter, and film producer. He is best known for his films Maftuningman (Delighted by You) (1958) and Oʻtgan kunlar (Days Gone By) (1967). Maftuningman is the first Uzbek comedy and is considered to be one of the greatest Uzbek films of all time.

Aʼzamov is widely regarded as one of the founders of the Uzbek film making industry. He received numerous honorary titles and awards during his lifetime, including the titles People's Artist of the Uzbek SSR (1970) and People's Artist of the USSR (1979).

== Life and work ==
Yoʻldosh Aʼzamov was born on May 10, 1909, in Tashkent. From 1926 until 1930, Aʼzamov acted at Sovkino and Vostokkino film studios. Starting from 1930, he acted and directed films at Uzbekfilm. Aʼzamov died on June 16, 1985, at the age of 75. He was buried at Chigʻatoy Cemetery in Tashkent.

Aʼzamov is best known for his films Maftuningman (Delighted by You) (1958) and Oʻtgan kunlar (Days Gone By) (1967). Maftuningman is the first Uzbek comedy and is considered to be one of the greatest Uzbek films of all time.

== Filmography ==
=== As director ===
- Qilich (Russian: Клыч) (Qilich) (1934)
- Узбекский киноконцерт (Uzbek Cinema and Concert) (1941)
- Tohir va Zuhra (Tohir and Zuhra) (1945)
- Во имя счастья (In the Name of Happiness) (1956)
- Maftuningman (Russian: Очарован тобой) (Delighted by You) (1958)
- Рыбаки Арала (The Fishers of the Aral) (1958)
- Furqat (Russian: Фуркат) (Furqat) (1959)
- Отвергнутая невеста (The Rejected Bride) (1961)
- Дорога за горизонт (The Road Beyond the Horizon) (1963)
- Abdulla Nabiyev (Russian: Пятеро из Ферганы) (Abdulla Nabiyev) (1963)
- Листок из блокнота (A Page from a Notebook) (1965)
- Sayyod qoʻngʻirogʻi (Russian: Колокол Саята) (The Bell of Sayyod) (1966)
- Oʻtgan kunlar (Russian: Минувшие дни) (Days Gone By ) (1969)
- Olovli soʻqmoqlar (Russian: Горячие тропы) (The Fiery Paths) (1971)
- Mehrobdan chayon (Zulmatni tark etib) (Russian: Скорпион из алтаря (Побег из тьмы)) (Scorpion in the Pulpit (The Escape from Darkness)) (1973)
- Odamlar tashvishida (Russian: Ради других) (For Others) (1976)
- Ota nasihati (Russian: Отцовский наказ) (A Father's Advice) (1979)
- Katta va qisqa hayot (Russian: Большая короткая жизнь) (Big and Short Life) (1981)
- Пароль — «Отель Регина» (Uzbek: Parol — «Regina mehmonxonasi») (Password: The Hotel Regina) (1983)

=== As actor ===
- Аня (Anya) (1927)
- Земля жаждет (Uzbek: Yer chanqogʻi) (The Earth Is Thirsty) (1930)
- Последний бек (The Last Bey) (1930)
- Yuksalish (Russian: Подъем) (The Ascent) (1931)
- Sayyod qoʻngʻirogʻi (Russian: Колокол Саята) (The Bell of Sayyod) (1966)
- Hayot tunda oʻtib ketdi (Russian: Парень и девушка) (1968)
- Oʻtgan kunlar (Russian: Минувшие дни) (Days Gone By ) (1969)
- Olovli soʻqmoqlar (Russian: Горячие тропы) (Hot Paths) (1971)

== Awards ==
- People's Artist of the USSR (1979)
- People's Artist of the Uzbek SSR (1970)
- Honored Worker of Art of the Uzbek SSR (1965)
- State Hamza Prize (1970)
- Order of the October Revolution
- Order of the Badge of Honor (18 March 1959)
- Medal "For Distinguished Labour" (6 December 1951)
