= Kelinlar qoʻzgʻoloni (film) =

- A Russian theatrical poster for Kelinlar qoʻzgʻoloni
- Directed by: Melis Abzalov
- Written by: Said Ahmad (play)
- Starring: Tursunoy Jaʼfarova; Dilorom Egamberdiyeva; Dilbar Ikromova; Klara Jalilova; Noila Toshkenboyeva; Luiza Qosimova; Rihsi Ibrohimova; Gulchehra Saʼdullayeva; Nabi Rahimov; Diyas Rahmatov; Obid Yunusov; Rashid Malikov; Jamshid Zokirov; Soat Sharipov; Tesha Moʻmimov; Gʻoyib Iskandarov; Muhammadjon Rahimov
- Music by: Mirhalil Mahmudov
- Production company: Uzbekfilm
- Release date: 1984
- Running time: 70 minutes
- Countries: Uzbek SSR, USSR
- Languages: Uzbek, Russian

Kelinlar qoʻzgʻoloni (Uzbek: Келинлар қўзғолони / Kelinlar qoʻzgʻoloni; Russian: Бунт невесток) is a 1984 Soviet-era Uzbek comedy film based on an eponymous play by the Uzbek writer Said Ahmad and directed by Melis Abzalov. Kelinlar qoʻzgvoloni is one of the most critically acclaimed Uzbek films of the Soviet period. Like Melis Abzalov's previous film Suyunchi, Kelinlar qoʻzgʻoloni tells the story of an authoritative grandmother.

== Plot ==
Farmon bibi (played by Tursunoy Jaʼfarova) is a wise and loving, but strict mother who lives with the families of her seven sons in one house. Nigora, the wife of her youngest son, rebels against Farmon Bibi while the other wives sympathize with her. In one scene, the mother and her daughters-in-law go to the bazaar. Toward the end of the film, Farmon bibi changes her attitude and gives in to the demands of her daughters-in-law.
