= Armon (film) =

1986 film by Melis Abzalov

Armon/Армон
- A screenshot from Armon: Yodgor Saʼdiyev (right) as Boʻri Senior
- Directed by: Melis Abzalov
- Written by: Rihsivoy Muhammadjonov; Vladimir Sokolov
- Starring: Oybarchin Bakirova; Dilorom Egamberdiyeva; Baxtiyor Zokirov; Obid Yunusov; Yodgor Sa’diyev; Ra’no Zokirova; Diyas Rahmatov
- Music by: Rumil Vildanov
- Production company: Uzbekfilm
- Release date: 1986
- Running time: 87 minutes
- Country: USSR (Uzbek SSR)
- Languages: Uzbek, Russian

Armon or Ukhodya, ostayutsya (transliteration of the Russian title of the film meaning "Once They Leave, They Never Return") (Uzbek: Armon, Армон; Russian: Уходя, остаются) is a 1986 Soviet-Uzbek drama film directed by Melis Abzalov. The film depicts the hard work of Uzbek children, the elderly and women during the grim years of the Soviet-German war against Nazi Germany and its allies.

== Plot ==
Boʻri loses his father at a young age in the 1920s. (His father's name was also Boʻri. Boʻri Senior is portrayed by Yodgor Saʼdiyev.) He grows up in a city and studies to become an electrician. He then returns to his village. While every girl in the village would gladly marry him, he falls in love with Xumor, who is already engaged to another man. As the Soviet-German war breaks out, Boʻri, along with his fellow villagers, leaves the village to fight in the war. He never returns.

== Cast ==
- Boʻri (Senior) - Yodgor Saʼdiyev
- Boʻri (Junior) - Baxtiyor Zokirov
- Boyxotin - Oybarchin Bakirova
- Rais - Obid Yunusov
- Xumor - Dilorom Egamberdiyeva
- Qoʻzivoy - Diyas Rahmatov
- Oʻlmasoy - Raʼno Zokirova
