= Said Ahmad =

Uzbek writer

- Uzbek: Saidahmad Husanxoʻjayev
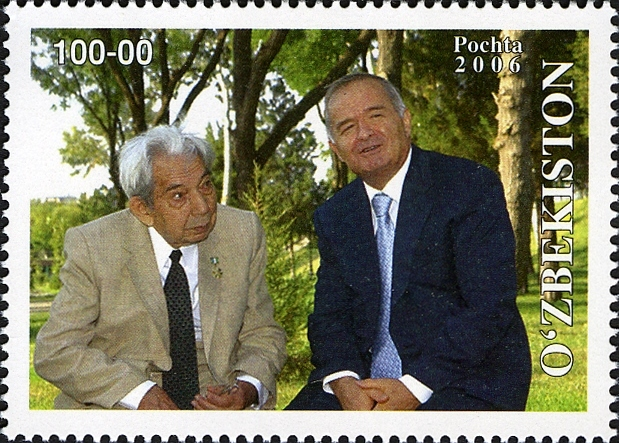
- Born: 10 June 1920; Tashkent, Uzbek SSR
- Died: 5 December 1900 (aged 100); Tashkent, Uzbekistan
- Citizenship: USSR → Uzbekistan
- Spouse: Saida Zunnunova
- Writing career
- Language: Uzbek language
- Notable works: "Jimjitlik", "Kelinlar qoʻzgʻoloni", "Ufq"

Said Ahmad (10 June 1920 in Tashkent, Uzbek SSR – 5 December 2007 in Tashkent, Uzbekistan) was an Uzbek Soviet writer and playwright. He was awarded the title of "Hero of Uzbekistan" (1999), People's Writer of Uzbekistan, Honored Artist of Uzbekistan, and was a recipient of the orders "Buyuk xizmatlari uchun" and "Do'stlik".

== Early life ==
He was born on 10 June 1920 in the Samarqand Darvoza neighborhood of Tashkent city. He studied for a period at the Nizami Pedagogical Institute and worked at the "Mushtum" journal in 1941. In the years 1942–1943, he was employed at the Republic Radio, followed by contributions to the "Qizil O'zbekiston" newspaper from 1943 to 1947 and work for the "Sharq Yulduzi" journal from 1948 to 1950.He was also recognized as the "Oʻzbekiston xalq yozuvchisi" received the State Prize."

== Works ==
Ahmad's literary works include stories such as "Choʻl burguti", "Lochin", "Boʻston", "Toʻyboshi", "Jimjitlik", "Turnalar", "Hayqiriq", "Alla", "Muhabbatning tugʻilishi", "Qorakoʻz Majnun". In his works, such as "Sobiq", "Qoplon", "Oʻrik domla", "Mening doʻstim Babbaev", "Muzey", "Boʻri ovi", "Xandon pista", and numerous others, he explores human flaws and intricacies. His stories on rural life, including "Qadrdon dalalar" (1949), and "Hukm" (1958), as well as his novels like the "Ufq" trilogy, comprising "Qirq besh kun", "Hijron kunlari" (1964), and "Ufq boʻsagʻasida" (1969), depict the fate of individuals amidst the upheavals of their time. His novel "Jimjitlik" (1988) portrays the inner struggles of a solitary traveler, while works like "Sherzod va Gulshod" (1945), " Kelinlar qoʻzgʻoloni" (1976), and "Kuyov" (1986) provide insights into the lives of children.

== Works created during the years of independence ==
During the years of independence, Ahmad also created lyrical short stories. His collections, including "Xandon Pista" (1994) and "Bir oʻpichning bahosi" (1995), along with books like "Yoʻqotganlarim va topganlarim" (1998), "Qorako'z Majnun" (2001), and "Kiprikda qolgan tong" (2003), were published. Additionally, a three-volume work titled "Tanlangan asarlari" (2000) was also released. In "Yoʻqotganlarim va topganlarim," Said Ahmad illuminated the literary contributions of various Uzbek writers and poets such as Gʻafur Gʻulom, Oybek, Mirtemir, Shayxzoda, Saida Zunnunova, and others. His stories like "Qorako'z Majnun," "Ot bilan suhbat," and "Azroil oʻtgan yoʻllarda" are interwoven with memories from a turbulent era. Among his literary works are the works entitled "Borsa kelmas darvozasi", "Taqdir, taqdir...", "Oftoboyim", which shed light on the writer's life, creative path, and past.

Ahmad also ventured into the field of feuilleton. In 1947, he faced repression and was labeled as an enemy of the people. However, after Stalin's passing, he was rehabilitated. His comedies, "Kelinlar qoʻzgʻoloni" and "Kuyov", are currently performed at the Uzbek National Academic Theater, with "Kelinlar qoʻzgʻoloni" being staged in foreign countries as well. His dramas, based on the foundation of the "Ufq" work, contributed to the Uzbek film industry, including the production of the film "Muhabbat mojarosi" (1970) at the "Oʻzbekfilm" film studio and others.

== Awards ==
- Hero of Uzbekistan (25 August 1999)
- State Hamza Prize (1977)
- Order of Outstanding Merit (26 August 1997)
- Order of Friendship (8 June 1995)
- Medal of Fame (25 August 1994)
- Order of Lenin (25 February 1991)
- Order of Friendship of Peoples (9 June 1980)
- Order of the Badge of Honor
- Medal "For Distinguished Labour" (18 March 1959)
- People's Writer of the Uzbek SSR (9 June 1980)
- Honored Artist of Uzbekistan

== Death ==
Ahmed died on 5 December 2007, at the age of 87.
