= Penal Servitude (film) =

1928 film

- Directed by: Yuli Raizman
- Written by: Sergei Yermolinsky
- Cinematography: Leonid Kosmatov
- Production company: Gosvoenkino
- Release date: 28 November 1928
- Country: Soviet Union
- Languages: Silent; Russian intertitles

Penal Servitude (Russian: Каторга, romanized: Katorga) is a 1928 Soviet silent drama film directed by Yuli Raizman.

== Cast ==
- Andrei Zhilinsky as Ilya Berts
- Pavel Tamm as Peshekhonov
- Vladimir Popov as Chernyak
- Vladimir Taskin as Illarion Ostrobeylo
- Mikhail Yanshin as Telegraphist
- Boris Lifanov as Katulsky

== Bibliography ==
- Christie, Ian & Taylor, Richard. The Film Factory: Russian and Soviet Cinema in Documents 1896-1939. Routledge, 2012.
