= Alexander Alexeev (conductor) =

Russian conductor (1938–2020)

- Александр Алексеев
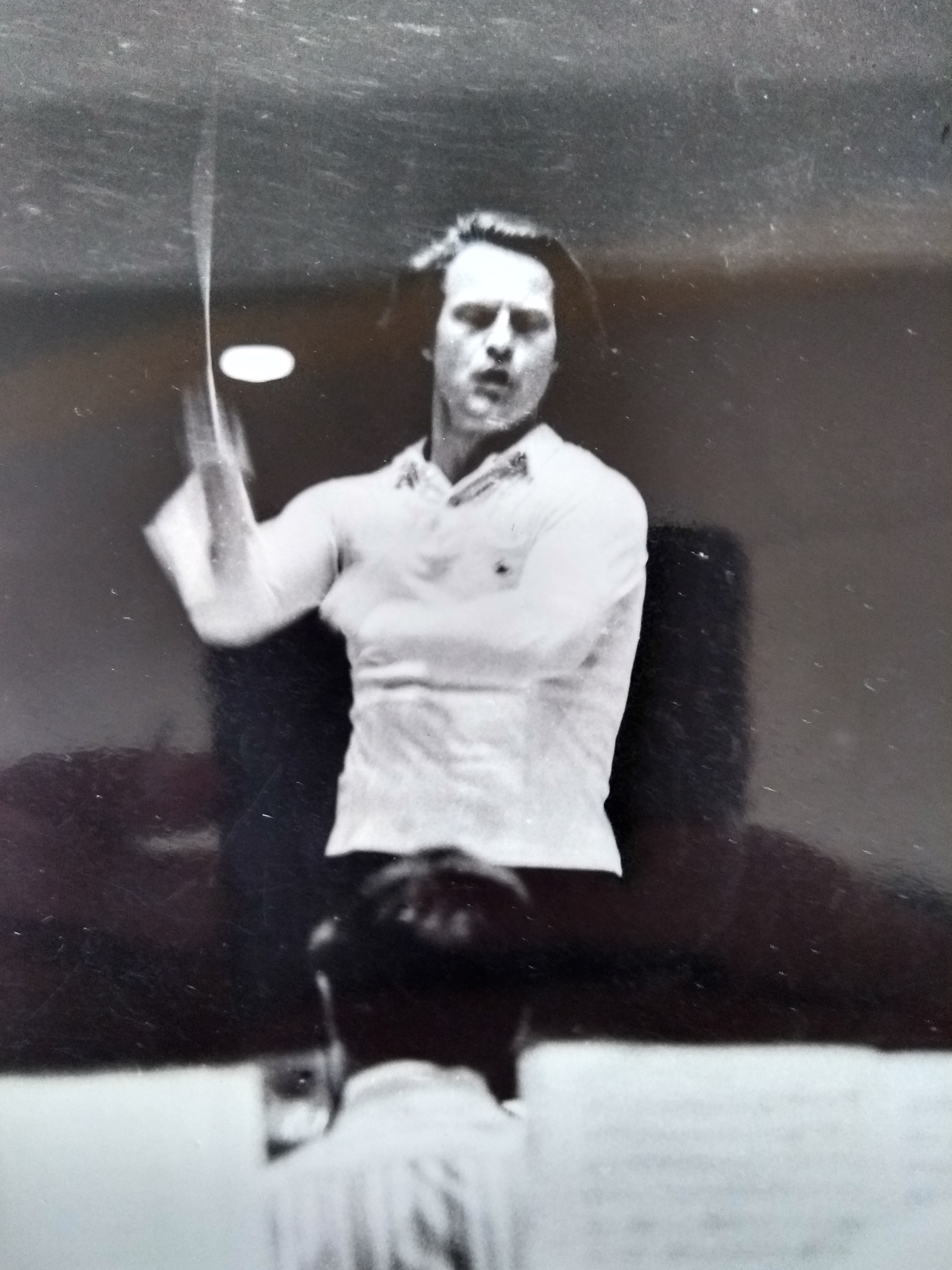
- Alexander Alexeev in rehearsal in 1963
- Born: 10 March 1938; Belkovo, Novgorod Oblast, Russian SFSR
- Died: 7 October 2020 (aged 82); Saint Petersburg, Russia
- Education: Leningrad Conservatory; Vienna Music Academy
- Occupations: Conductor; Academic teacher
- Organizations: Leningrad Maly Opera Theatre; Bolshoi Theatre; Saint Petersburg Conservatory
- Awards: People's Artist of Russia

Alexander Vasilievich Alexeev (Note: Russian: Александр Васильевич Алексеев, romanized: Aleksandr Vasilyevich Alekseyev) (10 March 1938 – 7 October 2020) was a Soviet and Russian conductor and academic teacher, who received the Honored Artist of the RSFSR award. He was head of the department of opera and symphony conducting at the Saint Petersburg Conservatory between 2000 and 2008.

== Life and career ==
Alexeev was born in Belkovo, Novgorod Oblast, Russia. From 1957 to 1966 he studied choral and symphonic conducting with Konstantin Olchov and Edouard Grikurov at the Leningrad Conservatory. He was selected by cultural authorities in Moscow and Leningrad, as one of very few Russian conductors like Mariss Jansons, for postgraduate studies with Hans Swarowsky at the Vienna Music Academy from 1971.

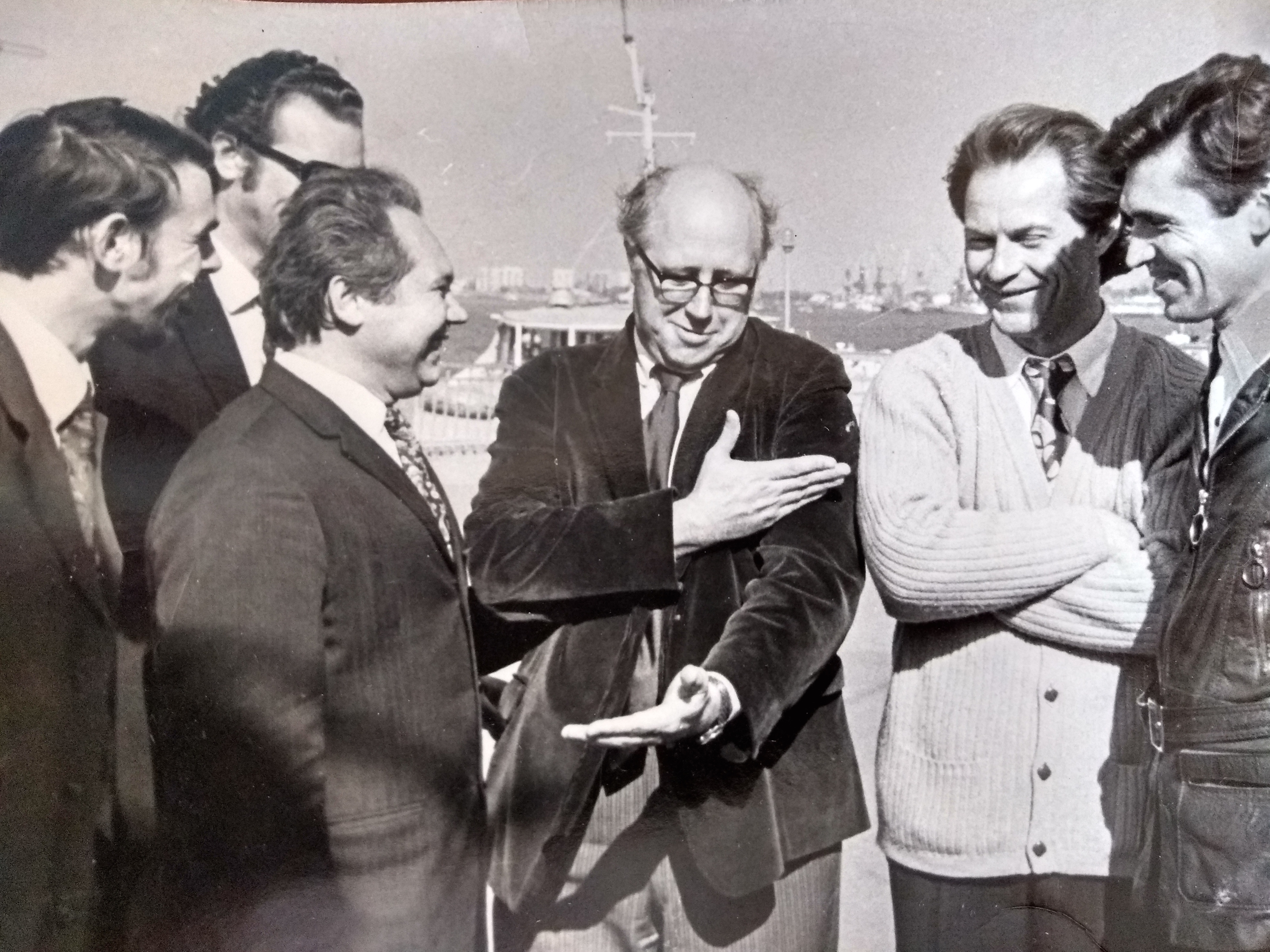
Mstislav Rostropovich (center), Alexander Alexeev (center right), and Eduard Serov (right) with students in Volgograd (1973)

He held first positions as conductor at the Ulyanovsk State Symphony Orchestra, the Leningrad State Academic Maly Opera Theatre (today Mikhailovsky Theatre), as well as the Chelyabinsk State Academic Opera and Ballet Theatre, before becoming Music Director of the Ulyanovsk State Symphony Orchestra. In 1978, Alexeev was awarded the honorary title of Honored Artist of the RSFSR.

Alexeev worked at the Bolshoi Theatre in Moscow from 1982 to 1984. He was offered the post of chief conductor with the Finnish Radio Symphony Orchestra in Helsinki, but as he never joined the communist party, he had to stay in the Soviet Union where he worked until 1992 as music director of the Kharkov Philharmonic Orchestra, with whom he won in 1986 the orchestra competition amongst Soviet Republics. Alexeev recorded with different orchestras in Russia for the label Melodya, including the Moscow Radio Symphony Orchestra, as well performed regularly with leading musicians of the Soviet Union such as Gidon Kremer, Oleg Kagan, Vadim Repin, Yuri Bashmet, David Geringas, Natalia Gutman, Dmitri Alexeev, Mikhail Pletnev, Grigory Sokolov, and Dmitri Bashkirov. Among numerous productions in Leningrad, he conducted in 1966 Shostakovich's Katerina Ismailova (Lady Macbeth of the Mtsensk District) at the Leningrad State Academic Maly Opera Theatre with Larisa Avdeyeva in the title role and Shostakovich involved in the rehearsals. He recorded Anton Arensky's Piano Concerto in F minor, Op. 2, with pianist Aleksei Cherkasov and the USSR Radio Symphony Orchestra in 1987, published with other works by Arensky. It was one of two Soviet recordings at the time.

In 1992 he joined the faculty of the Saint Petersburg Conservatory, and served between 2000 and 2008 as head of the department of opera and symphony conducting. As a conductor, he stood in the tradition of Aleksandr Gauk and Edouard Grikurov, while in his teaching he was a leading advocate of Hans Swarowsky's school in Russia (he translated Swarowsky's "Wahrung der Gestalt" into Russian).

Alexeev died in Saint Petersburg on 7 October 2020 at the age of 82. He is buried in Volkovo Cemetery, Saint Petersburg. He was married to the concert pianist Olga Michailovna Alexeeva (1955-2015).
