= Virgin Soil Upturned =

Virgin Soil Upturned may refer to:

- Virgin Soil Upturned (novel), a 1932 novel by Mikhail Sholokhov
- Virgin Soil Upturned (opera), a 1937 opera by Ivan Dzerzhinsky
- Virgin Soil Upturned (1939 film), a Soviet drama film
- Virgin Soil Upturned (1959 film), a Soviet drama film
