= Oybarchin Bakirova =

Uzbek actress (1950–2020)

- Born: 27 June 1950; Uzbekistan
- Died: 20 March 2020 (aged 69); Uzbekistan
- Occupation: actress
- Awards: People’s Artist of the Republic of Uzbekistan (2000)

Oybarchin Abbosovna Bakirova (Uzbek: Ойбарчин Аббосовна Бакирова; 27 June 1950 – 20 March 2020) was an Uzbek actress, People's Artist of Uzbekistan (2000).

== Life ==
Oybarchin Bakirova was born on June 27, 1950, in Andijan in the family of actor, People's Artist of Uzbekistan Abbos Bakirov. She was one of two daughters and two sons in the family. Bakirova grew up in a family of artists and wanted to become an actress from a young age. After graduating from high school, she studied at the Tashkent University of Theater and Fine Arts.

In 1971, Bakirova graduated from the Tashkent Institute of Theater and Art and began her career at the Uzbekfilm film studio. From 1971 to 1973, she was working in Uzbek Drama Theater and from 1973 in Uzbek Theater of Film Actor.

== Career ==
Bakirova has created various characters in dozens of films, such as "Children of Coin", "Harmony", "Game" and "My Child". She is also known through her work in the field of dubbing having voiced over a hundred movie and cartoon characters. In 2000, Bakirova was awarded a title of People's Artist of the Republic of Uzbekistan (2000).

Oybarchin Bakirova died on 20 March 2020 at the age of 70, and was buried at Chigatay cemetery in Tashkent.

== Filmography ==
- 1986 - The secret journey of the emir
- 1986 - Ukhodya, ostayutsya
- 1987 - Clinic
- 1988 - Look
- 1988 - Monster or someone else
- 1988 - Shock ("With love and pain") TV movie
- 1989 - Leader for one shift
- 1989 - Conspiracy
- 1990 - Code of Silence
- 1990 - The reluctant killer
- 1991 - Iron Man
- 1992 - Alif Leila ("Cunning from the tales of 1001 nights")
- 1993 - Kosh ba kosh

== Awards ==
- Special Prize of the Union of Cinematographers of Uzbekistan for the role of Bayhotun in the movie "Armon" (1986)
- Honored Artist of the Uzbek SSR (1989)
- People's Artist of Uzbekistan (2000)

== See also ==
- Rano Yarasheva
