= Abror Tursunov =

Uzbek actor

- Tursunov in The Potter and the Persimmon, 1990
- Died: 7 February 2024
- Citizenship: Uzbekistan

Abror Tursunov (died 7 February 2024) was an Uzbek actor. He was known for his roles in Suyunchi and Abdullajon. Tursunov died after a long illness on 7 February 2024.
