= Pyotr Alekseyev =

- Пётр Алексеев

Member of the Supreme Soviet of the RSFSR
- In office 1971–1980

Personal details
- Born: 15 January 1913 Tashkent, Russian Empire
- Died: 3 February 1999 (aged 86) Moscow
- Resting place: Kuntsevo Cemetery
- Education: Tashkent Pedagogical Institute; Higher Party School
- Occupation: Journalist, politician

Pyotr Fyodorovich Alekseyev (Russian: Пётр Фёдорович Алексеев; January 15, 1913 – February 3, 1999) was a Soviet journalist, publicist, and editor-in-chief of the newspapers Sovetskaya Rossiya (1971–1976) and Izvestia (1976–1983). He was a deputy of the Supreme Soviet of the USSR of the 9th and 10th convocations.

== Biography ==
Born January 15, 1913, in Tashkent.

From 1932 he worked as an editorial and journalistic writer in Tashkent, Samarkand, and Novgorod. He became a member of the Communist Party of the Soviet Union in 1940.

In 1948 he graduated from the Tashkent Pedagogical Institute (in absentia) and the Higher Party School under the Central Committee of the CPSU (in absentia).

From 1950 to 1953 Alekseev worked as editor-in-chief of the newspaper "Soviet Cotton Growing", and from 1953 to 1959, at the newspaper Pravda.

From 1959 to 1960 he served on the staff of the Central Committee of the CPSU.

From 1960 to 1962 he served as deputy editor-in-chief of the newspaper Selskaya Zhizn, first deputy editor-in-chief in 1962, and editor-in-chief from 1962 to 1971.

Member of the Central Committee of the Communist Party of the Soviet Union since 1966. Member of the Central Committee of the CPSU since 1976 (candidate since 1971).

From 1971 to 1976 he served as editor-in-chief of the newspaper Sovetskaya Rossiya. In 1976, After Lev Tolkunov was dismissed from his position as editor-in-chief of Izvestia, Alekseyev was appointed to his position. Under Alekseev, many "undesirable" employees were either fired or sent abroad as special correspondents.

During Alekseev's tenure as editor-in-chief, Izvestia's circulation fell by half. He served in that position until 1983, when he retired.

According to publicist Edvin Polyanovsky, while editor-in-chief of Izvestia, Alekseev suffered from anthropophobia.

He is buried in Moscow at the Kuntsevo Cemetery.
