= Oʻtgan kunlar (film) =

- Directed by: Yoʻldosh Aʼzamov
- Production company: Uzbekfilm
- Release date: 1969
- Country: Soviet Union
- Languages: Uzbek, Russian

Oʻtgan kunlar is a 1969 Soviet-era Uzbek film directed by Yoʻldosh Aʼzamov, based on the 1925 novel Oʻtgan kunlar. The film stars Oʻlmas Alixoʻjayev and Gulchehra Jamilova in the main roles as the lovers Otabek and Kumush, with Abbos Bakirov, Rahim Pirmuhamedov, Nabi Rahimov, Habib Narimanov, Hamza Umarov, Razzoq Hamroyev, Razzoq Hamroyev, and Maryam Yakubova in supporting roles. Aʼzamov, Muhamedov, Bakirov, Hamroyev, Umrarov and the cameraman Mikhail Krasnyansky received the 1970 State Hamza Prize for their work in the film.

== Plot ==
The film is set in Tashkent, around the beginning of the 19th century, and tells the story of the lives of the upper class society of the period. The film follows the story of lovers Otabek and Kumush against the background of civil strife between the rulers and people.
