= Yuri Bashmet =

Russian conductor, violinist and violist (born 1953)

Yuri Bashmet Юрий Башмет
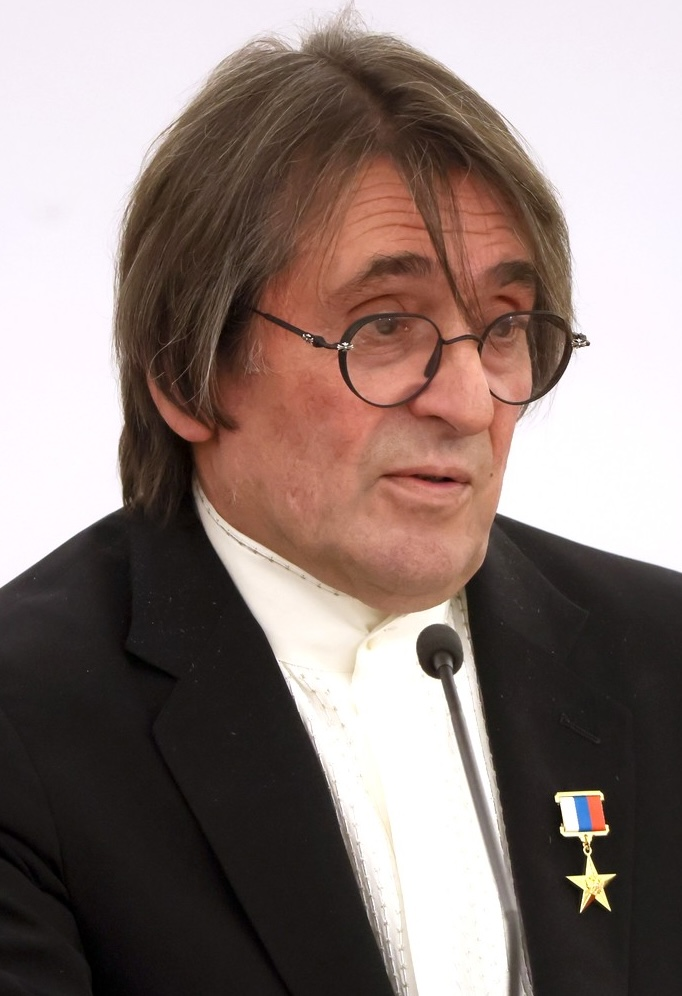
- Bashmet in 2022

Background information
- Born: 24 January 1953 (age 73); Rostov-on-Don, Russian SFSR, Soviet Union
- Genre: Classical
- Occupations: Violist
- Instruments: Viola
- Website: www.yuribashmet.com
- Awards:

Yuri Abramovich Bashmet (Note: Russian: Ю́рий Абра́мович Башме́т, romanized: Yury Abramovich Bashmet) (born 24 January 1953) is a Russian conductor, violinist, and violist.

== Biography ==
Yuri Bashmet was born on 24 January 1953 in Rostov-on-Don in the family of Abram Borisovich Bashmet and Maya Zinovyeva Bashmet (née Krichever). His paternal grandmother, Tsilya Efimovna, studied singing at the conservatory for two years in her youth. His maternal grandmother, Darya Axentyevna, interpreted native Hutsul songs.

In 1971, he graduated from the Lviv secondary special music school. From 1971 till 1976, he studied at the Moscow Conservatory. His first viola teacher was Professor Vadim Borisovsky; after whose death in 1972 was succeeded by Professor Fyodor Druzhinin. Druzhinin was also the tutor of Yuri Bashmet for the probation period and for his postgraduate study at the Moscow Conservatory (1976–78).

In 1972, Bashmet purchased a 1758 viola made by Milanese luthier Paolo Testore, which he uses for his performances to date. In the late 1970s through to the early 1980s, Bashmet developed his career as a solo performer. He began his active concert activities in 1976, with a tour of Germany with the Moscow Chamber Orchestra founded by R. Barshay. He has performed in leading concert halls the world over: in Europe, USA, Canada, Latin America, Australia, New Zealand and Japan. He was the first violist to perform a solo recital in such halls as the Amsterdam Concertgebouw, the Barbican in London, the Berlin Philharmonic, La Scala of Milan, the Great Hall of the Moscow Conservatoire, and the Great Hall of the Leningrad Philharmonic.

Yuri Bashmet has performed under many noted conductors, including Rafael Kubelík, Mstislav Rostropovich, Seiji Ozawa, Valery Gergiev, Gennady Rozhdestvensky, Colin Davis, John Eliot Gardiner, Yehudi Menuhin, Charles Dutoit, Neville Marriner, Paul Sacher, Michael Tilson Thomas, Kurt Masur, Bernard Haitink, Kent Nagano, Simon Rattle, Yuri Temirkanov, and Nikolaus Harnoncourt.

He started his conducting activity in 1985, consistent with his reputation as a bold contemporary artist unafraid of taking risks.

In 1992, Bashmet reconstituted the orchestra featuring some of the most talented young musicians of Russia who are graduates and postgraduate students of the Moscow Conservatory. This orchestra performs in the Great Hall of the Moscow Conservatory and has toured extensively abroad. Its performances have been recorded for broadcast by major radio companies, including the BBC, Bayerischer Rundfunk, Radio France, and Radio Luxembourg. The orchestra has recorded several CDs, among these a recording of the Alfred Schnittke Triple Concerto (EMI Records), soloists: Gidon Kremer, Yuri Bashmet and Mstislav Rostropovich. Another CD, of the Thirteenth String Quartet by Shostakovich and the quintet by Brahms (Sony Classics), was acclaimed "Best Album of 1998" by The Strad magazine, and was nominated for a Grammy Award.

As a soloist and a conductor, Bashmet has performed with leading symphony orchestras: Royal Liverpool Philharmonic Orchestra. Berlin Philharmonic, Berlin Symphony, New York Philharmonic, Вауrische Rundfunk, San Francisco Symphony, Chicago Symphony, Boston Symphony, Vienna Philharmonic, French Radio Philharmonic Orchestra, Paris Orchestra, etc. Repertoire with these orchestras has included the symphonic works of Brahms, Haydn, Schubert, Mozart, Tchaikovsky, and Beethoven. A particularly noted concert at the Bolshoi Theatre in Moscow featured Shostakovich's Symphony No. 13.

Bashmet has performed recitals, as well as his joint performances together with noted musicians including Mstislav Rostropovich, Gidon Kremer, Sviatoslav Richter, Isaac Stern, Anne-Sophie Mutter, Martha Argerich, Evgeny Kissin, Mischa Maisky, M. Portal, Shlomo Mintz, Oleg Kagan, Roberto Carnevale, Viktor Tretiakov, and Maria João Pires. Of particular note were Bashmet's performances in collaboration with Sviatoslav Richter, two performers of different generations but with common artistic views. They performed together at the "December Evenings" festival in the Pushkin museum in Moscow, as well as on world tours. Another of Bashmet's longstanding artistic friendships, personal and in performance, is with Mstislav Rostropovich.

Numerous modern composers have composed works especially for Yuri Bashmet or dedicated to him, including 50 viola concertos and other works: A. Schnittke – "Concerto", "Monologue"; S. Gubaidullina – "Concerto", E. Denisov -"Concerto", D. Tavener – "The Myth Bearer"; M. Pletnev – "Concerto", A. Golovin – "Sonata-breve". A. Raskatov – "Sonata"; V. Sharafyan - "Surgite Gloriae" viola concerto with duduk, descant, baritone and orchestra, G. Kancheli – "Liturgy " and "Styx"; A. Tchaikovsky – two "Concertos"; Barkauskas – "Concert", A. Eshpay – "Concert"; P. Ruders – "Concerto". A. Schnittke – "Concerto for three" (dedicated to Mstislav Rostropovich, Yuri Bashmet, Gidon Kremer), and many others. Yuri Bashmet has transcribed the "String Trio" by A. Schnittke for string orchestra; this work was published by "Sikorsky" (Vienna) under the name "Trio – Sonata". Particular works for which Bashmet is known include the Chaconne by J.S. Bach, Arpeggione Sonata by F. Schubert, Sinfonia Concertante for violin and viola by W. A. Mozart, Viola Sonata by D. Shostakovich, and the Concerto for viola and orchestra by A. Schnittke.

Yuri Bashmet has participated in many festivals all over the world: Tanglewood (USA), Tours, Bordeaux, Biarritz, Menton (France), Brussels, Kainuu, Mikkeli (Finland), Kreuth (Germany), Siena, Sorrento, Camerino, Streza (Italy), and "March Music Days" (Ruse, Bulgaria). He was an artistic director and one of the organizers of the festivals in Rolandseck (Germany), and Elba Island (Italy). He is a regular participant of the Promenade Concerts in Royal Albert Hall (London, UK). The highest appraisal of Bashmet's talent was his appointment to become the artistic director of the "December evenings" music festival in Moscow, a position previously held for 17 years by Sviatoslav Richter .

Since 2006 Yuri Bashmet together with famous Belarusian pianist Rostislav Krimer has held the annual Yuri Bashmet International Music Festival in Minsk (Belarus), which has become one of the most prominent events in the Commonwealth of Independent States.

Yuri Bashmet is a founder and a Jury Chairman of the International Contest of Violists in Moscow, the only event of its kind in Russia. He is the President of the Lionel Tertis International Viola Competition in Great Britain, the member of Jury for the violists' contests in Munich and "Maurice Vie" in Paris.

Cinema and TV broadcasting companies of different countries (Great Britain, France, Russia) have filmed several movies about his art. Several times his CDs won prestigious European awards, including the "Diapason d'Or" and "Choc".

Yuri Bashmet has participated in many large-scale charity actions of the international importance, in Carnegie Hall (with Elton John and Stevie Wonder), in London (in the memory of Princess Diana); in the concerts, whose proceeds were transferred to the funds aimed to help the victims of the natural disasters in Armenia, Japan, and to the funds helping handicapped children.

The International Charity Fund, established by Yuri Bashmet, has established the Dimitri Shostakovich International Award for outstanding achievements in the field of the international art. This award was granted to Gidon Kremer, Thomas Quasthoff, Victor Tretiakov, Valery Gergiev, Anne-Sophie Mutter, Olga Borodina, Irina Antonova, Natalia Gutman, and Evgeny Kissin.

In March 2014 he signed a letter in support of the position of the President of Russia Vladimir Putin on Russia's military intervention in Ukraine.

According to a statement from the Lviv National Music Academy (LNMA) on 12 March 2014, Yuri Bashmet has been stripped of his title as honorary professor at the LNMA in response to his signing of an open letter in support of Russia's military intervention in Crimea, Ukraine, the country where he grew up.

=== As educator ===
Since 1978, Yuri Bashmet has taught students of the Moscow Conservatoire. In 1988 he attained the position of docent, and in 1996 he was made a professor. Since 1980, Bashmet has conducted master classes in Japan, Europe, USA, and Hong Kong. He teaches summer courses at the Accademia Chigiana (Siena, Italy) and at the academy of Tours (France). His students have won many of the international contests and now are performing in orchestras worldwide. In 1996, he created and headed the "Experimental Chair of Viola", where in addition to the works of solo viola repertoire, the curriculum includes extended studies of the viola parts in the chamber, operatic and symphonic music, as well as advanced study of the performance styles of the past and the present. Yuri Bashmet leads national education projects, as a presenter and art director of the TV programs The Station of Dream and Music in the Museums of the World.

== Moscow Soloists ==
In 1986, Yuri Bashmet founded the Moscow Soloists chamber orchestra. In 1991, when the orchestra was on tour in France, Bashmet, as Art Director, signed a temporary contract with the administration of the city of Montpellier. Afterwards the musicians of the orchestra decided to stay in France, a decision untenable for Bashmet himself, who was committed contractually to return to Russia. He consequently resigned his position with the orchestra, while inviting the musicians to return to Russia with him. Soon after that the orchestra disbanded, and its members have joined other ensembles abroad.

Bashmet re-established the Moscow Soloists, after returning to Moscow, with new musicians. In 2000, Bashmet conducted the first modern performance of the Symphony for Strings by Georgy Sviridov.

== Honours and awards ==
When he was a student, Bashmet was granted the Second Award at the International Contest of Violists in Budapest (1975) and Grand Prix at the ARD International Music Competition in Munich (1976), attaining worldwide recognition.

His artistry has won recognition in various awards and regalia in Russia and abroad. He has been granted the high titles of the Honorary Artist of RSFSR (1983), Honorary Artist of the USSR (1991), State Award of the USSR (1986), State Awards of the Russian Federation (1994 and 1996), Аward-1993 "Best Musical Instrument Performer of the Year" (a title comparable to the "Oscar" in cinema). Yuri Bashmet is an Honorary Academician of the London Academy of Arts.

In 1995, he was awarded one of the most prestigious awards in the world, of the "Sonnings Musikfond" in Copenhagen. Previous recipients include Igor Stravinsky, Leonard Bernstein, Benjamin Britten, Yehudi Menuhin, Isaac Stern, Arthur Rubinstein, Dmitri Shostakovich, Mstislav Rostropovich, Sviatoslav Richter, and Gidon Kremer.

In 1999, by the Act of the Minister of Culture of the Republic of France, Yuri Bashmet was granted the rank of the Officer of Arts and Literature. In the same time the Prime Minister of Lithuania marked his invaluable impact to the Art by granting Bashmet the highest honor of the Republic of Lithuania. In 2000 the President of Italy granted him an honor "For Contribution to Motherland", and in 2002, the president of the Russian Federation Vladimir Putin presented him the honor "For Contribution to Motherland", 3rd grade. In 2003, Yuri Bashmet was granted the rank of Commander of the French Légion d'honneur.

In 2000, the Russian Biographic Society granted Yuri Bashmet the honorary title "The Man of the Year", in 2001 – "Zealot of the Enlightenment". In 2003, Bashmet became the laureate of the "Olympus" National Award.

On 2 June 2022, President Putin presented him with the award of Hero of Labour of the Russian Federation.

- Honored Artist of the RSFSR (1983)
- USSR State Prize (1986)
- People's Artist of the USSR (1991)
- State Prize of the Russian Federation (1993, 1995, 2000)
- Sonning Award (1995; Denmark)
- Officer of the Order of the Lithuanian Grand Duke Gediminas (Lithuania, 18 June 1999)
- Officer of the Ordre des Arts et des Lettres (2000, France)
- Commander of the Order of Merit of the Italian Republic (Italy 2000)
- Order of Merit for the Fatherland, 3rd class (15 April 2002) – for outstanding contribution to the development of national art
- Officer of the Légion d'honneur (2003, France)
- Order of Merit (Ukraine), 3rd class (19 April 2004) – a significant personal contribution to the development of cultural ties between Ukraine and the Russian Federation, many years of fruitful creative activity; Bashmet was stripped of this award on 19 January 2025 by a decree of Ukrainian President Volodymyr Zelenskyy
- Honorary Professor of Moscow State University (2004)
- Honorary Citizen of Rousse, Bulgaria (2005)
- Order of Honour (6 February 2008) – for outstanding contribution to the development of national music and many years of creative activity
- Grammy Award (February 2008; USA) – with the orchestra "Soloists of Moscow" – for the execution of works by Stravinsky and Prokofiev in the category "Best performance by small ensembles"
- Honorary Member of the Royal Academy of Music, London.
- Order of Francisc Skorina (Belarus)
