= Rano Yarasheva =

Uzbekistan artist

- Born: February 15, 1961 (age 65); Samarqand region, Kattakurgan district, Uzbek SSR, USSR
- Occupations: theater and film actress
- Years active: from 1984 to present time
- Awards: Oʻzbekistonda xizmat koʻrsatgan artist(Honored artist of Uzbekistan)

Rano Yarasheva (born February 15, 1961, in Kattakurgan, Samarkand, Uzbek SSR, USSR) is an actress in Uzbekistan.

== Biography ==
She initially began her career in theater as a stagedresser. She's well known among the Uzbek people for her comedic, tragic, and dramatic roles. The actress, after having four children in her family, later had five children. As a young girl, she dreamed of performing on stage, and at the age of 23, she entered the Tashkent Theater and Art Institute to study theater and makeup artistry. Upon completing her studies, she began her career at the Uzbek National Academic Drama Theater as a dresser-makeup artist. After several years, she performed her first role in the play "Yorqinoy" at that theater. Subsequently, she started participating in various films. Rano Yarasheva gained recognition among the Uzbek people for her roles in historical films like "Mehrobdan Chayon," "Sohibqiron," and "Uvaysiy." Up to this day, she has taken part in over 20 films and performances. In 1999, she was honored with the title "Artist Who Served in Uzbekistan" for her acting career. Presently, she continues her creative work as an artist at the Uzbek National Academic Drama Theater under the direction of Yodgor Sa’diyev.

== Filmography ==
Her career, which started at the age of 23 in 1984, has seen her perform in more than 20 different genres on stage and in movies. Among the Uzbek people, she is primarily known as an influential actress. Her roles in films like "Mening Akam Boydoq", "Endi Dadam Boydoq", "O'zimdan O'zimgacha", "Sevgi Farishtasi 2", "Ichkuyov", "Telba", "Shabnam," "Kuzda Gullagan Daraxt", "Poyma Poy," "Oqpadar," "Ayriliq", "Qorako'z," "Baxt Qushi", "Vijdon" and "Ferida" have contributed to her recognition as an actress by the public. Additionally, Ra'no Yarasheva has been involved in writing poetry outside of her acting career. Collections of her poems, such as "Samarqand Sog'inchi" (1996), "Seni Tashlab Ketolmayman" (1998), "Hajr" (2000), and narrative works like "Ilohiy Ishq Qissasi" have been published. Ra'no Yarasheva is a member of the Union of Writers of Uzbekistan.

== Awards ==
- Oʻzbekistonda xizmat koʻrsatgan artist(Honored artist of Uzbekistan)(1999)
