= Maftuningman =

1958 film

- Film's poster in Ukrainian
- Directed by: A. Akbarxoʻjayev
- Written by: Turob Toʻla; Mikhail Melkumov
- Produced by: Yoʻldosh Aʼzamov
- Starring: Klara Jalilova; Sanʼat Devonov; Raʼno Hamroqulova; Turgʻun Azizov; Abbos Bakirov; Nabi Rahimov
- Edited by: X. Umarova
- Music by: I. Akbarov; M. Burxonov; M. Leviyev
- Production company: Uzbekfilm
- Release date: 1958
- Running time: 81 minutes
- Countries: Uzbek SSR, USSR
- Languages: Uzbek, Russian

Maftuningman (Uzbek: Maftuningman / Мафтунингман; Russian: Очарован тобой) is a 1958 black-and-white Uzbek musical/comedy produced by Yoʻldosh Aʼzamov. Maftuningman is the first Uzbek comedy and is considered to be one of the greatest Uzbek films of all time. Maftuningman depicts many interesting aspects of Uzbek culture and life in Soviet kolkhozes.

== Plot ==
The movie tells the story of two filmmakers seeking talented people for acting in a musical entitled Maftuningman (Delighted by You). One of the filmmakers travels to different parts of the Uzbek SSR in search of potential actors. Wherever he goes he meets exceptionally talented people and hears about other gifted people in different parts of the country. The actors for the movie were in fact chosen in this way from different parts of Uzbekistan.

== Music ==
Almost all of the songs featured in Maftuningman became highly popular and remain so today. Many Uzbeks know the songs from the movie by heart. The songs "Doʻppi tikdim" ("I've Made a Hat"), "Goʻzal Toshkеnt" ("Beautiful Tashkent"), "Maftun boʻldim" ("Delighted by You"), and ""Sartarosh Ali"" ("Barber") are all-time favorites of Uzbeks.
