= Sergei Yermolinsky =

Sergei Aleksandrovich Yermolinsky (Russian: Сергей Александрович Ермолинский; 14 December 1900, Vilnius – 18 February 1984, Moscow) was a Soviet screenwriter and dramatist.

== Life ==
A graduate of the Kaluga Gymnasium (Unified Labor School), he organized a theatre school in Kaluga. He studied at the Institute of Oriental Studies and in 1925 graduated from the Literature Faculty of Social Sciences at Moscow State University, going on to work on the newspapers Pravda and Komsomolskaya Pravda and in 1925 to collaborate with the film director Yuli Raizman.

He became friends with Mikhail Bulgakov, whose participation in the Commission of the Union of Writers was partly what led to Yermolinsky's arrest in late 1940 - the order was signed by Pyotr Pavlenko. He was held in Lefortovo Prison, where he tried to commit suicide. With his involvement in anti-Soviet activities still unproven, he was transferred to another prison in Saratov. In spring 1942 he was sentenced to three years of internal exile in Shieli. Nikolay Cherkasov and Sergei Eisenstein successfully petitioned the Kazakhstan People's Commissar of the NKVD for his release in 1943 and took him on as a screenwriter in Almaty.

He moved to Moscow secretly due to his exile status in 1946–1947 and then openly in 1949, before being rehabilitated in 1956 after the death of Stalin. The case against him was finally dismissed on 16 June 1962 "for lack of evidence". In 1967 he wrote a letter in support of Solzhenitsyn on abolishing censorship. He was awarded the Order of the Red Banner of Labour on 2 January 1971 and the Order of Friendship of Peoples in 1981.

== Filmography ==
- The Earth Is Thirsty (1930)
- Virgin Soil Upturned (1939)
- Tanker "Derbent" (1941)
- The Elusive Avengers (1967)
