= Happy Birthday (1998 film) =

- Directed by: Larisa Sadilova
- Written by: Larisa Sadilova
- Produced by: Gennadiy Sidorov
- Cinematography: Alexander Kazarenskov; Irina Uralskaya
- Music by: Georgy Sviridov
- Distributed by: Atika Films (France)
- Release date: 1998
- Running time: 70 minutes
- Country: Russia
- Language: Russian

Happy Birthday (Russian: С днём рождения!, romanized: S dnyom rozhdeniya!) is a 1998 Russian drama film produced in monochrome written and directed by Larisa Sadilova.

== Plot ==
Happy Birthday follows events during a day at a Russian maternity hospital, focussing on several women who are patients there.

== Cast ==
- Gulya Stolyarova
- Irina Prosyina
- Eugene Turkina
- Lyuba Starkova
- Masha Kuzmina
- Rano Kubaeva

== Awards ==
- 1998: Cottbus Film Festival of Young East European Cinema
  - FIPRESCI Prize (Larisa Sadilova)
  - Honorable Mention for Feature Film Competition (Larisa Sadilova)
- 1999: Créteil International Women's Film Festival
  - Grand Prix (Larisa Sadilova)
