= Edvin Polyanovsky =

- Born: Edvin Lunikovich Polyanovsky; 19 February 1937; Lesnoy, Tersky District, Leningrad Oblast, USSR
- Died: 11 March 2006 (aged 69); Moscow, Russia
- Occupations: journalist, piblicist

Edvin Lunikovich Polyanovsky (Russian: Эдвин Луникович Поляновский) (19 February 1937 – 11 March 2006), was a Russian journalist, publicist, and long-term employee of newspaper Izvestia. Polyanovsky was born on 19 February 1937 in Lesnoi, Tersky District, Leningrad Oblast, USSR. After his father's death in May 1945, his family moved to Staraya Russa, where he grew up. He was raised by his stepfather, Mikhail Savchenkov.

In 1962, he graduated from the faculty of journalism in Moscow State University.

After working in Bryansk newspapers, he was accepted by literary employee to redaction of newspaper "Izvestia".

Polyanovsky often travelled to various regions of USSR with missions for investigation conflict situations. Based on his own journalistic research Polyanovsky spoken against conservative regulation, bribery and injustice.

First in USSR journalistic is raised in newspaper a topic of hospice and deontology, and about medical care for incurable patients.

Last two years he worked in newspaper "Rodnaya gazeta" (The Native Newspaper).

Polyanovsky died 11 March 2006 after his third infarction, in age 69. He was buried at the Troekurovsky cemetery.

== Rehabilitation of Marinesko ==
In 1988, in Liepaja, on moneys of sailors, a monument was erected to Alexander Marinesko. By order of the political administration of the Navy, at night, the name Marinesko was torn off the monument.

In Izvestia, the essay "Monument" was published by Polyanovsky in defence of Marinesko. For two years it was published in seven publications, after which came hundreds letters of support by readers.

Letters were sent to the Supreme Soviet of the Soviet Union, and many people wrote themselves to the Supreme Soviet and Central Committee of the Communist Party of the Soviet Union. From there letters were sent to the Ministry of Defence and to the Navy. In some towns there were demonstrations.

On 9 May 1990, Alexander Marinesko was posthumously awarded Lists of Hero of the Soviet Union.

In this rare case, public opinion became a real force.

== The topic of providing medical care to incurable cancer patients ==
During the time of the reactionary editor-in-chief Pyotr Alekseyev, Izvestia received a letter from the participant of the Great Patriotic War, a disabled person of the 1st group, Sergei Yakovlevich Afonin, from the city of Guryev.

“To the editor-in-chief of the newspaper“ Izvestia ”from the participant of the Second World War, a disabled person of the 1st group, Sergey Yakovlevich Afonin, who lives in the city of Guryev, Kazakh SSR.

Dear editors, perhaps when you receive my letter, I will die, as I am in a very serious condition.

Briefly about myself: I fought from 1941 to 1945, I have awards. After the front he worked. The war, obviously, gave consequences, I was paralysed, before paralysis I was operated on 9 times. My district doctor gave a referral to the oncological hospital, where I am now in the radiology department, in ward No. 5. Head. Department of Comrade Naurazbayev.

Yes, I’m a very serious patient, I don’t get up, I cannot eat myself, but am I glad myself like this? It would be better if they bury me alive than to be in the ward and in memory, to understand everything, but unable to change anything. I am not served a vessel. I cannot hold the jar in which I am recovering, and I spill it on the bed and lie in a wet bed. For a month and a half, they have not only not washed me, but they have not even washed me. I am bracing myself as I cannot shout to anyone. And so, in order not to take off my linen, they keep me naked, and flies bite me, and cockroaches crawl over me. My illness is accompanied by unbearable pain, and therefore, when the effect of the injection ends, I have to scream. When they finally come to me, they yell at me. I am scared to think that there are so few of us left and that many of us will face such a cruel death. Why didn't I die under the enemy's bullet? For me, there are not even always medicines for injections. I have to ask people to buy baralgin. A woman comes to me who, in fact, is a stranger to me. She is the daughter of my ex-wife, with whom I have not lived for 22 years. She just takes pity on me. So, head. department, seeing that they came to see me, began to insist that I be discharged from the hospital. But where will they take me? This woman herself 2 months ago underwent a serious operation, works, and lives with her family in a one-room apartment. I have no one else.

With sincere respect and faith in justice. Afonin S. Ya.".

At that time, there was a high probability of helping: "News" were under the roof of the Supreme Soviet of the USSR, they feared the newspaper, the perpetrators were most afraid of losing their party cards. Then there was a chance to help without publication.

Polyanovsky arranged a business trip for a different topic, previously called Guryev. But, unfortunately, Afonin had already died by that time. This letter was first published in 1990 in the essay "Word and Power".

== Investigative Journalism ==
=== "Witness" (1976) ===
About Anastasia Ivanovna Ogurtsova from the Smolensk regional center Sychevka, who went to Germany as a witness to the trial of Hitler's war criminal, talking about the death of her husband and son, members of the partisan movement, during the war. The continuation of the essay ("The Name on Granite") ─ about her complete loneliness and poverty - they were afraid to even show the editor-in-chief (an ominous figure at that time). Four years later, in 1980, the editor-in-chief went on a business trip, and the editorial office decided to take a chance, the essay was published. After the publication, Ogurtsova was finally assigned a pension, moved from a dilapidated hut to a good apartment. She died three months later.

=== "Explosion" (1985) ===
In the beet field, the women found a shell. After reporting him to the official authorities, there was red tape for two weeks. The paper did not reach the sappers. As a result, three first-graders were blown up by a shell that was lying in a flower bed near the store. When the application was discovered a few days after the tragedy, the shell was listed in it as cleared.

For the first time this material was published only in 1990 in the essay "Word and Power".

=== "After anonymous" (1985) ===
In Ussuriysk, the prosecutor's office opened a criminal case against Pavel Nefyodov, director of the leading timber industry enterprise, using an anonymous letter. The investigation lasted seven and a half years, the case consisted of 48 volumes, two courts sat for about nine months. The innocent Nefyodov served a total of two years, seven months and nine days in prison. The author of the anonymous letter remained unknown.

The newspaper achieved a second trial of the hero of the article, he was acquitted. After publications in "Izvestia", Nefedov was transferred from Ussuriisk to the capital of the region, Vladivostok, provided with an apartment and a decent job, the good name of the person was restored.

In addition, a decree of the Central Committee of the CPSU and a decree of the Presidium of the Supreme Soviet of the USSR were adopted, which outlawed anonymous letters.

=== "Field of Memory" (1987) ===
On the 10th kilometre of the Simferopol-Feodosia highway, the invaders shot 12,000 people during the war. Only R. Gurdzhi escaped, having got out from under the dead bodies at night. She lived in poor living conditions. After the publication of Izvestia I received an apartment.

=== "Zhuravlev" (1989) ===
An essay about a war invalid, pensioner I.M. Zhuravlev, who was persecuted by other pensioners, young and cruel - the KGB, the Ministry of Internal Affairs, the Armed Forces.

After the publication in Izvestia, an explosion was heard in Zhuravlev's apartment. The burnt veteran was found on the bed with his legs tied, his military orders were bolted to his chest with wire.

== Documentary series "The Unknown War" ==
Polyanovsky is scriptwriter of three series of serial "The Unknown War" - "The Siege of Leningrad", "The World's Greatest Tank Battle" and "The Battle of the Seas".

In 1979, Izvestia published his essay "Memory", in which letters from readers were published: after the release of the film, about two hundred viewers recognized their relatives in the newsreel - fathers, husbands and brothers. At the Central Studio one of the filmmakers, front-line cameraman Alexey Alekseevich Lebedev, at the request of the audience, he reshot footage from old films in photography.

== Some works ==
Joseph Brodsky	As long as there is such a language as Russian, poetry is inevitable (1988)
Arnold Hessen	I remember a wonderful moment (1971); Hello Pushkin (1973); And I left my mark (1976)
Yevpatoria assault	Chronicle of one landing (1983); After the landing (1983); I declare I'm alive (2002)
Vadim Kozin	Singer (1986) (due to censorship it was first published in 1990); Lonely voice (1993); The singers (1994); Bird feeding (2005)
Wreath of thorns (1988) - about the Russian post-revolutionary emigration
Alexander Marinesko	Monument (1988); Not only to keep in memory (1988); About valor, about exploits, about glory (1989); Hero and Time (1989); Alexander Marinesco nominated for the title of Hero (1990); And yet it happened (1990); Merits of the hero are not subject to jurisdiction (1990); Attack of the Century (1995); Attack of the Century (2002); Attack (2003); Stepson (2005)
Georgievskaya Anastasia Pavlovna	The last (1990); Without makeup (1990)
Osip Mandelstam	Death of Osip Mandelstam (1992); Poets and Executioners (1993); Poet and Executioner (2006)
Petro Grigorenko	Rebel general (1994)
Human rights movement	Humpbacked earth (1996); Schism (1997); Picnic (1998)
Alexey Berest	First over the Reichstag (1995)
about Gastello and Maslov	Two captains (1997)
Dunaev Petr Mikhailovich	Oblivion (2001)
Lvov Evgeny Sergeevich	Last year's snow (2001)
Battle for Height 776	Your son and brother (2001); Suvorik (2002); In the footsteps dead company (2003)
Vladimir Bogomolov	I will not remove not a single word from the book (2004); Humiliate and kill (2005)
Vasil Bykaŭ	Who resisted in this difficult life (2003)
Denikin Anton Ivanovich	Whiteguard (2005)
Zhukov Georgy Konstantinovich	Disgraced Marshal (2001)
Nefedov Pavel Alexandrovich	After anonymous (1985)
Alexandrova Nina Alexandrovna	Remembering Nina Alexandrova (1991); Nina (2002)
Adzhubei Alexey Ivanovich	The five principles of Adjubei (2004)
Starovoitov Vasily Konstantinovich	Chair cage (2004)
1930s repression	Kirov's assassination (1999); In a granite camp (1999)
Peskarev Georgy Sergeevich	Rebel-loner (2001)
Innokenty Smoktunovsky	Burn, burn his star ... (1994); Darling, today you are mine (2005)
Andrey Sinyavsky Donatovich	Provincial cemetery, or the last meeting (1995)
Seversky Alexander Nikolaevich	Russian American (1997)
Svyatoslav Fyodorov	Practical romantic (2000)
Dmitry Pavlovich Tsup	Death of the artist (1996); At the headboard (1997)
Pidemsky Nikolay Mikhailovich	The pier on the other side (1987); The past is yours, like candles (1990)

== Books ==
During his lifetime, 4 books were published, with more complete and uncensored, in comparison with the newspaper, essays:

- «Lesson», Moscow, Izvestia, 1985
- «So many years later», Moscow, Politizdat, 1985
- «Wreath remorse», Moscow, Izvestia, 1991
- «Osip Mandelstam Death», Petersburg-Paris, Publisher Grzhebin, 1993
