= Turgʻun Azizov =

Uzbek actor (1934–2024)

Turgʻun Azizov (30 November 1934 – 22 January 2024) was an Uzbek actor and director. He was awarded the People's Artist of Uzbekistan in 1974 and the USSR State Prize in 1977.

Azizov's credits include Maftuningman and Fiery Roads. He died on 22 January 2024, at the age of 89.
