= The Earth Is Thirsty =

1930 film

- Russian: Земля жаждет
- Directed by: Yuli Raizman
- Written by: Sergei Yermolinsky
- Starring: Yoʻldosh Aʼzamov; I. Aksyonov; Kira Andronikashvili; Dmitri Konsovsky; Nikoloz Sanishvili; Sergei Sletov
- Cinematography: Leonid Kosmatov; F. Timofeyev
- Music by: Reinhold Glière; S. Ryanzov; V. Sokolov
- Production company: Vostokkino
- Release date: 1930
- Country: Soviet Union
- Language: Russian

The Earth Is Thirsty (Russian: Земля жаждет) is a 1930 Soviet drama film directed by Yuli Raizman.

== Plot ==
The village of the Turkmen aul does not have enough water, which forces the inhabitants to obey the Aman-Durdi-bai. One day they are visited by a group of students at the Hydrotechnical University. The Komsomol offer the peasants an expedition to the hills of Timur, which limits the flow of water into the desert, which Aman-Durdi-bai does not like.

== Cast ==
- Yoʻldosh Aʼzamov
- I. Aksyonov
- Kira Andronikashvili
- Dmitri Konsovsky
- Nikoloz Sanishvili
- Sergei Sletov
- L. Vikhrev
- Mikhail Vinogradov
