= Georgy Sviridov =

Russian composer and pianist (1915–1998)

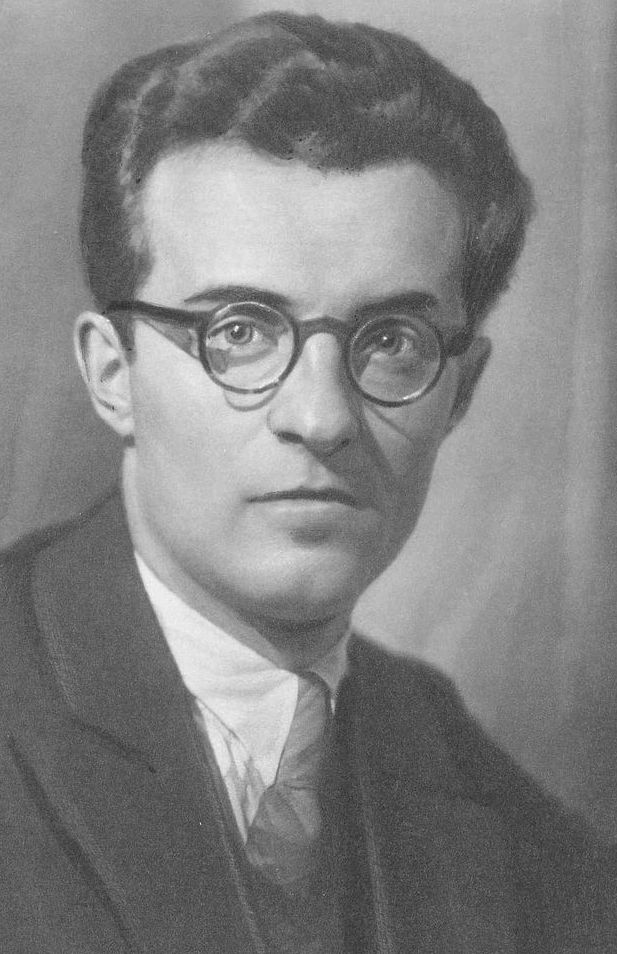
- Georgy Sviridov c. 1939
- Born: 16 December 1915; Fatezh, Russian Empire
- Died: 6 January 1998 (aged 82); Moscow, Russia
- Resting place: Novodevichy Cemetery, Moscow
- Occupation: Composer

Georgy Vasilyevich Sviridov (Russian: Георгий Васильевич Свиридов (Note: His name is also transliterated as Georgi and his patronymic as Vasil'yevich, Vasilievich, and Vasil'evich.); 16 December 1915 – 6 January 1998) was a Soviet and Russian composer. He is most widely known for his choral music, strongly influenced by the traditional chant of the Russian Orthodox Church, as well as his orchestral works which often celebrate elements of Russian culture.

Sviridov employed, especially in his choral music, rich and dense harmonic textures, embracing a romantic-era tonality; his works would come to incorporate not only sacred elements of Russian church music, including vocal work for the basso profondo, but also the influence of Eastern European folk music, 19th-century European romantic composers (especially Pyotr Ilyich Tchaikovsky), and neoromantic contemporaries outside of Russia. He wrote musical settings of Russian Romantic poetry by poets such as Mikhail Lermontov, Fyodor Tyutchev, and Alexander Blok. Sviridov enjoyed critical acclaim for much of his career in the Soviet Union and Russia.

== Early life and youth ==
Sviridov was born in 1915 in the town of Fatezh in the Kursk Governorate of the Russian Empire (present-day Kursk Oblast) to a family of Russian ethnicity. His father, Vasily Sviridov, a Bolshevik sympathizer during the Russian Civil War, was killed when Georgy was four. The family moved to Kursk, where Sviridov, still in elementary school, learned to play his first instrument, the balalaika. Learning to play by ear, he demonstrated such talent and ability that he was accepted into the local orchestra of Russian folk instruments. He enrolled in a music school in 1929, and following the advice of his teacher, M. Krutinsky, went to Leningrad in 1932, where he studied piano at the Leningrad Central Music College, graduating in 1936. From 1936 to 1941, Sviridov studied at the Leningrad Conservatory under Pyotr Ryazanov, then Dmitri Shostakovich. Mobilized into the Red Army in 1941, just days after his graduation from the conservatory, Sviridov was sent to a military academy in Ufa, but was discharged by the end of the year due to poor health.

== Musical legacy ==
In 1935, Sviridov composed a cycle of lyrical romances based on the poetry of Alexander Pushkin which brought him first critical acclaim. During his studies in Leningrad Conservatory, 1936–1941, Sviridov experimented with different genres and different types of musical composition, such as his Piano Concerto No. 1 (1936–1939), Symphony No. 1 (1936–1937), and the Chamber Symphony for Strings (1940). Later Sviridov would turn to Russian musical heritage, including folk songs, for inspiration.

Among Sviridov's most popular orchestral pieces are the "Romance," "Waltz," and "Winter Road" from his suite The Blizzard, musical illustrations after Pushkin (1975), that were extracted from his score for the eponymous 1964 film based on the short story from Alexander Pushkin's The Tales of the Late Ivan Petrovich Belkin. A short segment from his score for the 1965 film Time, Forward! (Время, вперёд!) was selected as the opening theme for the main evening TV news program Vremya (Время, 'time') and became a staple of Soviet life.

Poetry always occupied an important place in Sviridov's music. He composed songs and romances to the lyrics of Mikhail Lermontov (1938, 1957), Alexander Blok (1941), William Shakespeare (1944–1960), Robert Burns (in Russian translation, 1955). Despite the popularity of Sviridov's instrumental works, both the composer himself and the music critics regarded vocal and choral music to be his main strengths. Oratorio Pathétique (1959) after Vladimir Mayakovsky has been called a masterful musical rendering of one of the most popular Russian revolution poets. Sviridov's prolific vocal chamber and vocal symphonic output includes the oratorio To the memory of Sergei Yesenin (1956), Little Cantata Wooden Russia (1964) after Yesenin, Cantata Songs of Kursk (1964), Spring Cantata (1972) after Nikolay Nekrasov, songs, romances, and cantatas after Fyodor Tyutchev, Sergei Yesenin, Alexander Blok, Boris Pasternak, Alexander Prokofyev, Robert Rozhdestvensky. He also wrote one opera, Twinkling Lights (1951).

While Sviridov's music remains obscure in the West, it is widely known within Russia. According to his nephew Alexander Belonenko, who posthumously edited and published Sviridov's personal jottings:

[Sviridov's music] is perceived [in Russia] as a sort of natural, or to put it more precisely, co-natural phenomenon, an integral part of the Russian landscape... Not everyone watching ORT will know the name of the composer to the music that accompanies the program Vremya, which has become a symbol of our bustling times. To say nothing of the "Romance" from ... The Snowstorm. Whenever I visit Moscow, I hear it played in subway tunnels. In the words of Alexander Blok, it "sunk into the souls of the people".

The "Winter Road" movement that concludes the suite from The Snowstorm was allegedly plagiarized by Tappi Iwase and used as the theme for the popular video game series Metal Gear Solid. In 2008, during an on-camera interview by russian journalists from the gaming magazine “Igromania”, series creator, Hideo Kojima was shown a piece from the aforementioned movement. Following the allegation, the theme was removed from the fourth installment of the series onward.

== Honors and awards ==
In 1946, Sviridov was awarded the Stalin Prize for his Piano Trio. The Lenin Prize of 1960 was bestowed on the composer for his Oratorio Pathétique. Georgy Sviridov was awarded the USSR State Prize in 1968 and 1980 and honored with the title People's Artist of the USSR. He became a Hero of Socialist Labor (1975) and was twice awarded the Order of Lenin.

Asteroid 4075 Sviridov, discovered by the Russian astronomer Lyudmila Karachkina in 1982, was named in honor of Georgy Sviridov.

== Death ==
Sviridov died of a heart attack at the Moscow Central Clinical Hospital in the early morning hours of 6 January 1998.

== Filmography ==
- Virgin Soil Upturned (1939)
- Rimsky-Korsakov (1952)
- The Great Warrior Skanderbeg (1953)
- Resurrection (1960)
- The Blizzard (1964)
- Time, Forward! (1965)
- Trust (1976)
- Red Bells II (1982)
- Happy Birthday (1998)

== List of works ==
=== Orchestral ===
- Symphony for Strings (1940)
- Symphony No. 1 (1936–1937; previously lost, score rediscovered posthumously)
- Symphony No. 2 (1949; unfinished)
- Triptych, a small symphony for orchestra (1964)
- Snow Storm (also translated as The Blizzard), musical illustrations after Pushkin for orchestra (1975)

=== Concertante ===
- Piano Concerto No. 1 (1936–1939)
- Piano Concerto No. 2 (1942)

=== Chamber ===
- Piano Trio (1945 - rev. 1955)
- Piano Quintet in B minor (1945)
- String Quartet No. 1 (1945–1946)
- String Quartet No. 2 (1947)
- Music for Chamber Orchestra (1964)

=== Solo piano ===
- Seven Small Pieces for piano (1934–1935)
- Seven Songs after Mikhail Lermontov (1938)
- Piano Sonata (1944)
- Two Partitas for piano (1946, revised 1957 and 1960)
- Children's Album, seventeen pieces for piano (1948, revised 1957)
- Ruy Blas, serenade (1952)
- Partita in E minor
- Partita in F minor

=== Choral ===
- The Decembrists, oratorio (1955)
- Poem to the Memory of Sergei Yesenin, oratorio for tenor, mixed chorus and orchestra (1956)
- Five Choruses to Lyrics by Russian Poets (1958)
- Oratorio Pathétique to words by Mayakovsky for bass, mezzo-soprano, mixed chorus and orchestra (1959)
- Song about Lenin ("We Don't Believe") to words by Mayakovsky for bass, mixed chorus and orchestra (1960)
- Songs of Kursk, cantata after folk texts for mixed chorus and orchestra (1964)
- Wooden Russia, cantata to words by Yesenin for tenor, men's chorus and orchestra (1964)
- Sad Songs, small cantata to words by A. Blok for mezzo-soprano, female chorus and orchestra (1962–1965)
- It Is Snowing, small cantata to words by Boris Pasternak for female chorus, boys'chorus and orchestra (1965)
- Five Songs about Russia, cantata to words by Alexander Blok for soprano, mezzo-soprano, baritone, bass, mixed chorus and orchestra (1967)
- Sacred Love (for soprano), from the incidental music to Tsar Fyodor Ioannovich by Aleksey Tolstoy. (1969)
- Four Folk Songs for chorus and orchestra (1971)
- The Friendly Guest (also translated as The Radiant Guest), cantata to words by Sergei Yesenin for solo voices, chorus and orchestra (1971–1976)
- Spring Cantata to words by Nikolay Nekrasov for mixed chorus and orchestra (1972)
- Concerto in Memory of Alexander Yurlov for unaccompanied mixed chorus (1973)
- The Birch of Life, cantata to words by A. Blok for mezzo-soprano and orchestra (1974)
- Three Miniatures for solo voices and mixed chorus (1972–1975)
- Three Pieces from Children's Album for mixed chorus a cappella (1975)
- Ode to Lenin to words by R. Rozhdestvensky for narrator, chorus and large orchestra (1976)
- Hymns to the Motherland for chorus (1978)
- Pushkin's Garland (also known as "They beat the Dawn"), choral concerto on verses by Alexander Pushkin (1979)
- Night Clouds, cantata to words by A. Blok for mixed chorus a cappella (1979)
- Ladoga, choral poem for chorus to words by A. Prokofiev (1980)
- Songs From Hard Times, choruses to words of A. Blok for chorus a cappella (1980–1981 and later)
- Hymns and Prayers, words from liturgical poetry, for unaccompanied choir (1980–1997)

=== Opera ===
- Bright Lights, operetta in three acts after L. Sacharov and S. Poloski (1951)

=== Miscellaneous music ===
- "Othello", incidental music after Shakespeare (1942)
- Original soundtrack to The Blizzard (1964) film after Alexander Pushkin's story
- "Time, Forward!", suite of the film score (1967)
- Tsar Fyodor Ioannovich, incidental music to the play by Aleksey Tolstoy (1973)

=== Songs ===
- Six Romances on Texts by Pushkin for voice and piano (1935)
- Three Songs to words by Alexander Blok (1941)
- "Shakespeare Suite" for singer and piano (1944)
- "Country of My Fathers", song cycle after A. Isaakian for tenor and bass with piano accompaniment (1949–1950)
- "Songs to Words of Robert Burns" for bass and piano (1955)
- "My Father is a Farmer", song cycle to words by Yesenin for tenor and baritone (1957)
- "Suburb-Lyrics", seven songs after A. Prokofiev and M. Issakovsky for singer and piano (1938–1958)
- Eight Romances to words by Lermontov for bass and piano (1957–1958)
- "St Petersburg Songs" for soprano, mezzo-soprano, baritone, bass, violin, cello and piano (1961–1963)
- "Petersburg Songs" to words of A. Blok for bass and piano (1961–1963)
- "Russia Cast Adrift", better "Russia Now Launched", song cycle to words by Yesenin for tenor and piano (1977)
- Two Songs to words of Alexander Pushkin (1975–1980)
- Nine Songs to Words of A. Blok (1972–1981)
- Twenty-five Songs for bass and piano (1955–1981)
- "Petersburg", song cycle to words by A. Blok (1963–1995)
