= Vostokkino =

Soviet film studio

Vostokkino (Russian: Востоккино, literally "Eastfilm") was an early film studio (1928-1935) created for the development of film industry in the "eastern" national republics and oblasts of RSFSR, Central Asia and Caucasus. During 1933-1935 it was named Vostokfilm (Востокфильм). In June 1935 the management of Vostokfilm was accused of mismanagement and embezzlement and in August it was liquidated.

The only films of note produced by Vostokkino were the 1929 documentary Turksib and 1930 drama The Earth Is Thirsty.
