= Yodgor Saʼdiyev =

Uzbek Soviet actor

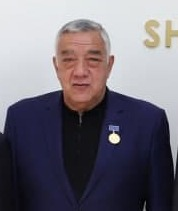
- Sa'diyev in 2022
- Born: Yodgor Habibovich Saʼdiyev; June 12, 1946 (age 80); Toshkent
- Occupations: Actor, Director
- Years active: 1968–present
- Notable work: Roles in "Shaytanat", "Mirzo Ulugbek," "The Robbers," "Marriage," "The Snow Queen," "Do Not Throw the Fire, Prometheus," and others
- Relatives: Xayrulla Saʼdiyev (brother), Jahongir Saʼdiyev (nephew)

Yodgor Habibovich Saʼdiyev (born June 12, 1946 in Tashkent) is an Uzbek-Soviet actor and director, People's Artist of Uzbekistan (1998) and laureate of the Uzbek State Prize named after Hamza (1989). In 2024, he was awarded the title of People's Artist of Tajikistan.

== Life ==
He was born in 1946 in Tashkent in the family of the actor Habib Saʼdiyev. After graduating from secondary school, he was admitted to the Tashkent State Theatrical Art Institute named after Alexander Ostrovsky and graduated in 1971. Since 1968, he has been an actor in the ensemble of the Uzbek State Academic Theater for Drama named after Hamza until today. In 1998, he was appointed the artistic director of the studio “Qalqon” (Shield) at the Ministry of Internal Affairs of the Republic of Uzbekistan. Yodgor Sagdiev is the brother of Xayrulla Saʼdiyev, an Uzbek theater and film actor and People’s Artist of the Uzbek SSR.

== Works ==
As a leading actor of the theater, Yodgor Sa'diyev played in over 60 roles, characterized by sharp psychological portrayals, complex relationships with the social environment and a rich inner life.

His first stage role was the French ambassador in the play “Mirzo Ulugbek”. He is also known for his roles as Karl Moor (“The Robbers”), Kochkaryov (“Marriage”), the storyteller (“The Snow Queen”), Hafiz (“The Boy and the Farmer”), Prometheus (“Do Not Throw the Fire, Prometheus”), the youngest son (“The Wanderers”), Babur (“Starlit Nights”), Klimkov (“Not on the List”), Arslon (“The Mirror”), Abdurahmon (“Mehrobdan Chayon”), Filipp (“The Dream”), Abror Hidoyatov (“The Show Continues”) and others.

He has also appeared in telefilms, video films and television productions, such as Ibn Sina in “Abu Ali ibn Sino”, Jabbor in “Diyonat”, Yoldosh in “Girdob”, Badiuzzamon in “Alisher Navoiy”, Orifjon in “Imon”, Orinboy in “Ichkuyov”, Jahongir in “The Last Arrow” and others. He directed the films “The Devil’s Wall”, “Five Parts”, “Jigarbandim”, “Honadon”, “Golden Shield” and others. He also directed the plays “Naive Women” (J.Pouren), “The Night Guest” (F.Bogdanov), “Life Behind the Door” (S.Sirojiddinov). He has voiced about 700 films. His brother Xayrulla Saʼdiyev and his nephew Jahongir Saʼdiyev also acted in the film “Shaytanat”.

Since 2020 he has been the director of the Uzbek National Academic Drama Theater.

He received the award for “the best male role of the year” for his role as Filipp in the play “The Dream” in 1983. He was awarded the State Prize of Uzbekistan named after Hamza in 1989.

=== Filmography ===
Year	Film name	Role
1967	„Dilbarim“	Abdusalom
1968	„Qizil qumlar (Красные пески)“	Yusuf
1969	„Oʻn uch terak koʻchasi“	Olimjon
1971	„Конец снежных пилотов “	Muhaten
1972	„Возраст тревог“	
1975	„Ты, песня моя“	
1978	„Весенняя мелодия “	
1979	„Серое дыхание дракона (Des Drachens grauer Atem)“	Muhaten
1983	„Yengilmas (Непобедимый)“	shayx Jaʼfar
1985	„Minarxarlik Joʻra ovchi (Джура, охотник из Мин-архара)“	Tog'ay
1986	„Armon“ (Уходя, остаются)“	Dadaboʻri
1988	„Чудовище или кто-то другой“	
1989	„Manjur varianti (Маньчжурский вариант)“	mayor Misumi
1990	„Облава на одичавших собак“	
1998-2003	„Shaytanat“	Asadbek / Asadbekning otasi
2000	„Besh qismat“	Yodgor Saʼdiyev
2008	„Iblis devori“	Ibrohim ota
2011	„Jigarbandim“	Qodirjon
2014	„Bekatdagi odam“	Boss
2014	„Xonadon egasi“	
2016	„Shaytanat (21-qism)“	Asadbek
	„Abu Ali ibn Sino“	Ibn Sino
	„Diyonat“	Abdujabbor
	„Oltin tulpor duoibadi“	
	„Soʻnggi oʻq“	Jahongir
	„Girdob“	Yoʻldosh
	„Xonadon“	
	„Ichkuyov“	Oʻrinboy
	„Alisher Navoiy“	Badiuzzamon
	„Imon“	Orifjon
