= Eduard Grikurov =

Russian conductor (1907–1982)

Eduard Petrovich Grikurov (Russian: Эдуард Петрович Грикуров; 11 April 1907, Tbilisi – 13 December 1982, Leningrad) was a Soviet conductor and People's Artist of the RSFSR.

Grikurov studied at the Conservatory in Tbilisi with Mikhail Ippolitov-Ivanov, and worked regularly with the Moscow Philharmonic Orchestra, the Kirov Opera (today Mariinsky Theatre), and the Leningrad Philharmonic Orchestra. From 1944 until 1969 Grikurov served as music director of the Leningrad State Academic Maly Opera Theatre (today Mikhailovsky Theater).

He was awarded the Stalin Prize in 1951, and was named People's Artist of the RSFSR in 1957.

Until his death he served as professor of conducting at the Leningrad Conservatory. His most notable students are Alexander Alexeev, Vakhtang Jordania, and Dmitri Kitayenko.
