= Nabi Rahimov =

Uzbek theater and film actor (1911–1994)

- Наби Раҳимов; Nabi Rahimov
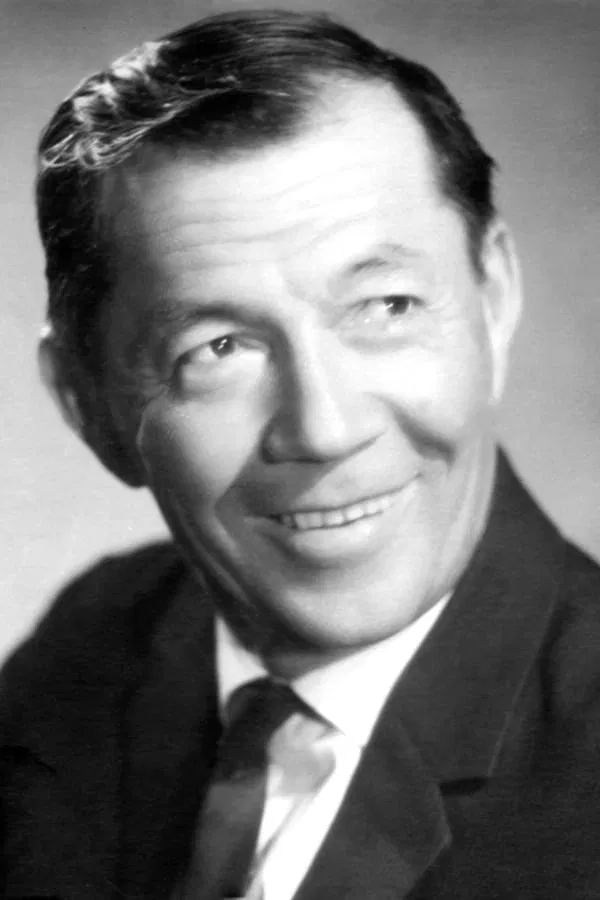
- Born: 7 November 1911; Kokand, Fergana Oblast, Russian Empire
- Died: 23 November 1994 (aged 83); Tashkent, Uzbekistan
- Citizenship: Russian Empire; Soviet Union; Uzbekistan
- Occupation(s): Actor and theater pedagogue
- Years active: 1918–1994
- Awards: People's Artist of the Uzbek SSR (1950); Order of Lenin (1959); People's Artist of the USSR (1966); USSR State Prize (1967); Order of Outstanding Merit (2004)

Nabi Rahimov (Note: Nabi Rahimov is written as Наби Раҳимов in Uzbek Cyrillic; Russian sources typically spell his name as Наби Рахимов, which is romanized as Nabi Rakhimov.) (7 November 1911 — 23 November 1994) was an Uzbek and Soviet stage and film actor and a pedagogue. He received many awards and accolades for his work, including People's Artist of the Uzbek SSR (1950), Order of Lenin (1959), People's Artist of the USSR, (1966), USSR State Prize, (1967), and the Order of Outstanding Merit (2004).

== Life andwork ==
Nabi Rahimov was born in Kokand, then the Russian Empire. He began acting at the age of six and began working in theater at the age of 14 in 1926. In 1929, he began working at the Uzbek Theater named after Hamza in Tashkent, where he worked until his death 1994.

In 1945, Rahimov became a member of the Communist Party. In 1946, he began teaching at the Tashkent Theater Institute, where he taught until 1961.

Throughout his career, Rahimov acted in many plays and movies, playing roles ranging from tragic characters to heroes, working with many other famous Uzbek actors and actresses, including Sora Eshontoʻrayeva, Mannon Uygʻur, and Abror Hidoyatov. He played the roles of main characters in a wide variety of plays, including in foreign classics. In particular, he played the roles of Iago in Othello, Laertes in Hamlet, and Duke of Albany in King Lear, in addition to playing key roles in Uzbek dramas such as Boʻriboy in Togʻa va jiyanlar, Bobo Kayfiy in Mirzo Ulugʻbek, and Shokir ota in Qutlugʻ qon. He also appeared in the celebrated Uzbek films Maftuningman (1958) and Kelinlar qoʻzgʻoloni (1984).

Rahimov died in Tashkent at the age of 83.

== Awards and accolades ==
- People's Artist of the Uzbek SSR (24 February 1950)
- Order of the Red Banner of Labour (6 December 1951)
- Order of Lenin (18 March 1959)
- People's Artist of the USSR (15 December 1964)
- State Hamza Prize (1967)
- USSR State Prize (1977)
- Order of the Patriotic War, 2nd class (11 March 1985)
- Order of Outstanding Merit (23 August 2004) (posthumously)
