= Yuli Raizman =

Soviet film director (1903–1994)

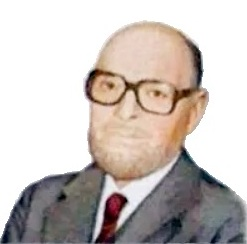
- Born: Yuli Yakovlevich Raizman; 15 December 1903; Moscow, Russian Empire
- Died: 11 December 1994 (aged 90); Moscow, Russia
- Occupations: Film director, screenwriter, pedagogue
- Years active: 1924–1989

Yuli Yakovlevich Raizman (Russian: Юлий Яковлевич Райзман; December 15, 1903 – December 11, 1994) was a Soviet and Russian film director, screenwriter and pedagogue. He was a People's Artist of the USSR (1964) and Hero of Socialist Labour (1973).

== Career ==
In 1924 he became a literary consultant for Mezhrabpom-Rus, the German-Russian film studio. He was assigned as assistant to Yakov Protazanov in 1925 and made his directorial debut in 1927 with The Circle, first drawing attention the following year with Penal Servitude. His next success was The Earth Is Thirsty in 1930, the Soviet Union's first sound film.

He joined Mosfilm in 1931 and in 1937 he won his Stalin Prize second degree for The Last Night, which was also his first collaboration with the writer Yevgeny Gabrilovich with whom he worked for the next 40 years. The film also achieved international recognition winning the Grand Prix at the Paris International Exhibition of 1937.

In 1942, his film Mashenka was also a success, which earned him a second Stalin Prize second degree .

He made a couple of war documentaries, Fall of Berlin – 1945 and Towards an Armistice with Finland, both of which won the Stalin Prize first degree .

Rainis (1949) won another Stalin Prize second degree.

Cavalier of the Golden Star, also known as Dream of a Cossack, won the top prize at the 1951 Karlovy Vary International Film Festival and also competed for the Grand Prix at the 1951 Cannes Film Festival. It also won the Stalin Prize of first degree.

The Communist marked the fortieth anniversary of the October Revolution and a follow-up, Your Contemporary, appeared in 1968.

His film Private Life (1982) won the USSR State Prize and was nominated for the Academy Award for Best Foreign Language Film.

His 7 Stalin/State Prizes made him one of the most decorated cultural figures in the Soviet Union. He was the first person to receive the Lifetime Achievement Award at the Nika Awards in 1988 presented by the Russian Academy of Cinema Arts and Science.

== Personal life ==
His uncle was Fedor Ozep.

He was married to Syuzanna Raizman (née Ter), who died in 1991.

== Filmography ==
- Penal Servitude (1928)
- The Earth Is Thirsty (1930)
- Lyotchiki (1935)
- The Last Night (1936) – Stalin Prize second degree (1941)
- Virgin Soil Upturned (1939)
- Mashenka (1942) – Stalin Prize second degree (1943)
- Nebo Moskvy (1944)
- Fall of Berlin – 1945 (1945) – Stalin Prize first degree (1946)
- The Train Goes East (1947)
- Dream of a Cossack (1951) – Stalin Prize first degree (1952)
- The Communist (1957)
- But What If This Is Love (1961)
- Your Contemporary (1967)
- A Strange Woman (1977)
- Private Life (1982) – USSR State Prize (1983)
- Time of Desires (1984)

== Awards and honors ==
- Order of the Badge of Honour (1940)
- Six Stalin Prizes (1941, 1943, 1946, 1946, 1950, 1952)
- People's Artist of the Latvian SSR (1949)
- Two Orders of the Red Banner of Labour (1950, 1963)
- People's Artist of the USSR (1964)
- Two Orders of Lenin (1967, 1973)
- Order of the October Revolution (1971)
- Hero of Socialist Labour (1973)
- Order of Friendship of Peoples (1983)
- USSR State Prize (1983)
- Vasilyev Brothers State Prize of the RSFSR (1986)
- Nika Award for the Lifetime Achievement Award (1988)
