= Abdullajon =

Abdullajon/Абдуллажон
- Poster in Russian and English
- Directed by: Zulfiqor Musoqov
- Written by: Zulfiqor Musoqov; R. Muhammadjonov
- Starring: Rajab Adashev; Toʻti Yusupova; Toʻychi Oripov; Hojiakbar Nurmatov
- Cinematography: Talʼat Mansurov; Vyacheslav Shin
- Edited by: Roziya Merganboyeva
- Music by: Mirhalil Mahmudov
- Distributed by: Uzbekfilm
- Release date: 1991
- Running time: 89 minutes
- Country: Uzbekistan
- Languages: Uzbek and Russian

Abdullajon or Abdulladzhan, ili posvyashchaetsya Stivenu Spilbergu (transliteration of the Russian title of the film meaning "Abdullajon or Dedicated to Steven Spielberg") is a 1991 Uzbek science fiction comedy film directed by Zulfiqor Musoqov. Abdullajon is the first Uzbek science fiction film and is considered by many critics, filmmakers, and fans to be the greatest Uzbek film made in post-Soviet Uzbekistan.

The film contains references to science fiction films of Steven Spielberg. The story is told in the first person by a security guard as a letter to Spielberg in broken, but humorous Russian. Most of the characters in the film speak in Uzbek.

== Plot ==
The film is narrated in the first person through the eyes of Sotiboldi, a security guard at a store in the village, as a letter to "Steven aka (Brother) Spielberg" in broken, but funny Russian. The film tells the story of an alien whose spaceship crashes in an Uzbek kolhoz. Bozorboy, a resident of the village, discovers the alien while looking for his lost cow. In his letter to Spielberg, Sotiboldi writes that the spaceship that crashed in Uzbekistan, "unlike the beautiful spaceship with lights in E.T. the Extra-Terrestrial, looks like a pot, but is real."

The alien is a white boy who speaks many languages and can perform miracles such as transporting people and objects through space and making it rain at will. Bozorboy names the alien Abdullajon after his grandfather and adopts the alien as his seventh child. The villagers think that Abdullajon is an illegitimate child of Bozorboy from his Russian wife somewhere.

Meanwhile, Russian scientists in Moscow predict that an alien will land in the village and ask the head of the kolkhoz to tell them immediately if anyone comes across the alien.

In the village, Bozorboy and Abdullajon search the gadget that would allow Abdullajon to call for help. Bozorboy finds the gadget first and hides it from Abdullajon. Later the gadget disappears from the place where Bozorboy hid it.

When Bozorboy says to Abdullajon that he needs "big money" to solve all of his problems, Abdullajon understands him literally and makes him a huge one rouble coin about the size of a manhole using the family's cauldron. Then Bozorboy asks Abdullajon to multiply a rouble banknote. Abdullajon easily creates much money from a single banknote. However, after reading in one of the notes that making counterfeit money is illegal, Abdullajon and Bozorboy burn all the money.

Abdullajon performs many more miracles such as enabling people to fly on hoes, making hens lay fifty eggs per minute, growing enormous fruits and vegetables (such as watermelons that weigh three tons), making a cow give birth to forty calves, and enabling a local technician to make his own hi-fi videocassette recorders.

The villagers are not aware that Abdullajon is responsible for all of the miracles. An old drunkard tells the head of the kolkhoz that he will tell everyone in the village that the head is responsible for all the miracles in exchange for getting a bottle of vodka every day. The head agrees and gets all the credit for the miracles. At a public meeting, he is presented a special hoe which fails to fly. Bozorboy tells the head of the kolkhoz about Abdullajon. The head asks Abdullajon to make his hoe fly as well, but Abdullajon refuses to comply, saying that the head is guilty of an "unforgivable crime", namely, of killing a bee. The head angrily climbs up to a tall tower with his hoe hoping he will be able to fly. However, his hoe doesn't fly and he falls to the ground and gets hurt.

Moscow deploys a fleet of tanks and fighter planes to find the alien. It is revealed that Bozorboy's wife hid the device that would enable Abdullajon to call for help. She gives it to Abdullajon and sees him off as he flies away in another pot-like spaceship. The film ends with Sotiboldi inviting Steven Spielberg to his village to "eat a big watermelon and a melon and ride a hoe."
