= National Pedagogical University of Uzbekistan named after Nizami =

- Nizomiy nomidagi O'zbekiston Milliy pedagogika universiteti
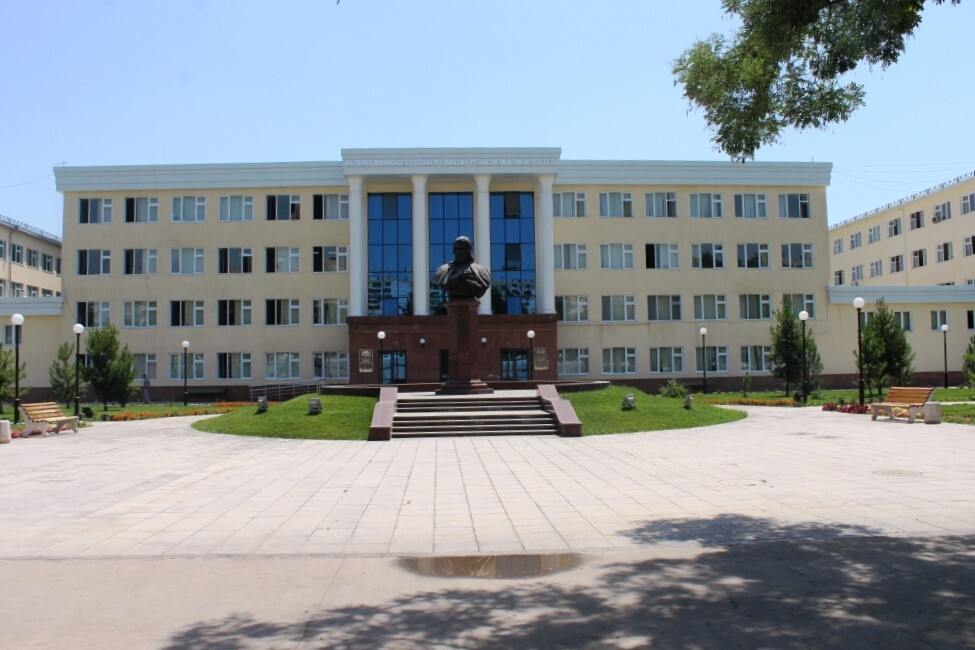
- Former name: Tashkent State Pedagogical University
- Established: 1935
- Rector: Hilola Umarova Oʻktamovna
- Location: 27 Bunyodkor Avenue, Chilanzar District, Tashkent, Tashkent, 100185, Uzbekistan; 41°16′23″N 69°12′18″E
- Website: https://npuu.uz/
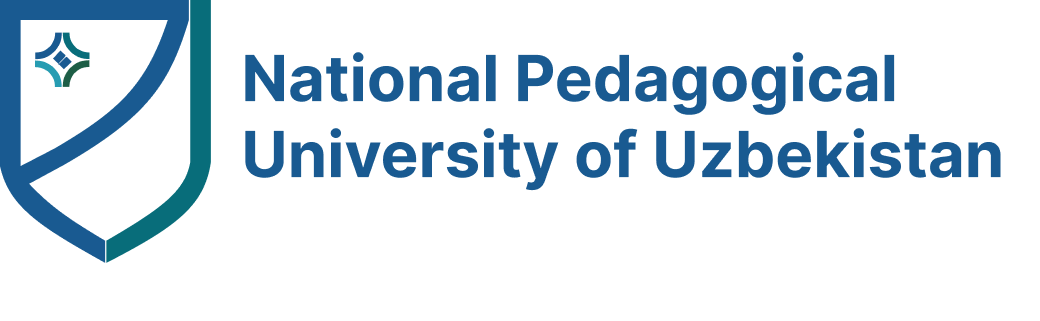

The National Pedagogical University of Uzbekistan named after Nizami (NPUU) is one of the best-seeded public universities established on 14 September 1935, in Tashkent. It specializes in pedagogical personnel training and is one of the best teacher-training schools in the region.

Its research areas are wide and cover the whole spectrum of disciplines regarding education, such as primary education, physics and mathematics science, natural sciences, history, foreign languages, special pedagogy, and preschool education, from a pedagogical perspective.

The University has trained over 200, 000 scientific and pedagogical personnel, forming trained teachers, educators, scientists, and specialists who are used in schools, lyceums, colleges of Uzbekistan, and actively contribute to the education of the world.

It was then renamed Tashkent State Pedagogical Institute named after Nizami in 1947, to honor Nizami Ganjavi, the Azerbaijani poet and educator of the 12th century. The poet and educator had heavily focused on the teachings of knowledge and moral education in his works. The institute was called the Tashkent Pedagogical Institute from 1953 to 1998, but it still provided training for teachers.

The National Pedagogical University of Uzbekistan entered a new phase of its development after the implementation of the Presidential Decree with the title "About the establishment of the National Pedagogical University of Uzbekistan", dated 28 April 2025 (PF-73). The current campus can now support an enrollment of around 19,000 students, while the new campus can support up to 25,000 students.

== The History of the Creation of University ==
The National Pedagogical University of Uzbekistan named after Nizami (NPUU) was established on 14 September 1935, based on the Faculty of Pedagogy at the Central Asian State University under Order No. 13/64 of the Commissariat of Public Education of the Republic of Uzbekistan.

The university has grown as a result of the union with the Tashkent Evening Pedagogical Institute named after V.G. Belinsky, a prominent Russian literary critic and pedagogue, in 1961, introducing other programs for evening education and expanding the student body. Tashkent State Pedagogical Institute was given the university status by the Decree of the Cabinet of Ministers of the Republic of Uzbekistan No. 77 of 02.02.1998. After that, the institution served as Tashkent State Pedagogical University named after Nizami for almost two decades, and during this period, despite the stipulations of Stalin's pedagogical program, over three hundred thousand students graduated who can now be counted among the distinguished activities of Uzbekistan's people today and who are already working in various countries of the world.

In total, since its inception, the university has trained more than 200 thousand scientific and pedagogical personnel.

== 2025 Reorganization ==
Tashkent State Pedagogical University named after Nizami was changed to the NPUU by the Presidential Decree PF-73 of 28 April 2025, with the goal of making NPUU the leading teacher training university and ensuring its scientific work is conducted in accordance with international standards. The reform aimed to establish NPUU as the leading university for teacher training and to ensure that the scientific processes take place according to international standards (PF-73 of 28 April 2025, Presidential Decree of Uzbekistan).

14 faculties, which had to support these processes, were merged and restructured, and the university's pre-existing teaching administration system was further strengthened into six Pedagogical Higher Schools, led by a dean who became responsible for teaching, scientific research activities, and establishing partnerships for the university. Academic processes were also digitalized by introducing a Learning Management System (LMS), connected with the national Higher Education Management Information System (HEMIS).

== Campus ==
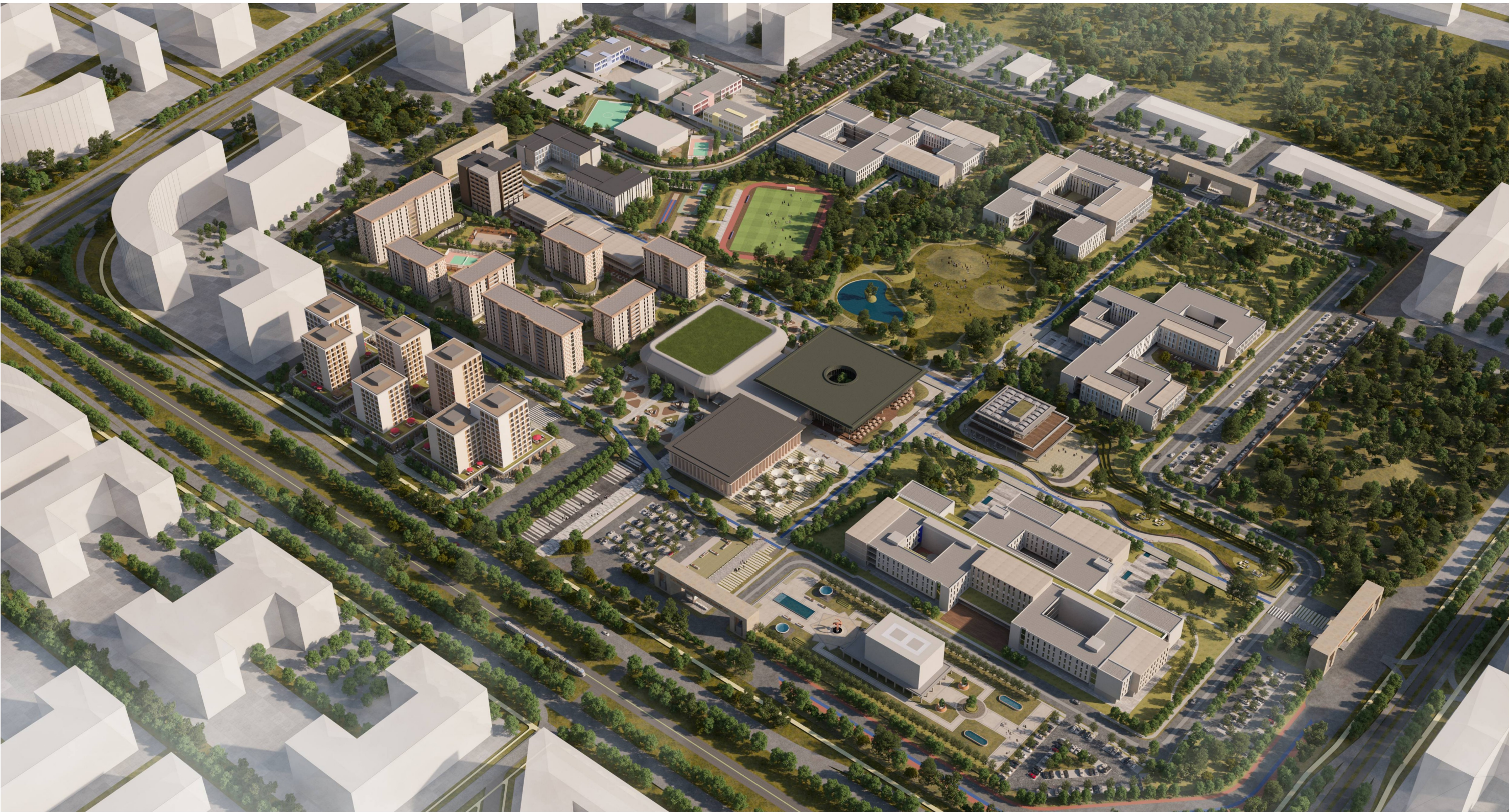
New campus

The National Pedagogical University of Uzbekistan is located in Tashkent, the capital of Uzbekistan and the center of the country. The main campus of the university is on Bunyodkor Avenue 27, in the district of Chilanzar of Tashkent. The total area of the university complex is 77,074.25 m2 with 24,694 m2 allocated for teaching and academic use.

== Academic Buildings ==
In total, the campus consists of 8 academic buildings with lecture rooms, seminar rooms, labs, and offices of the academic staff, and over 700 academic staff members conduct instruction at the academic buildings.

== University museums ==
The university has a museum complex which consists of three collections: The museum of the history of the university, the museum of archaeology, and the educational zoological museum.

== Governance and Structure ==
The governance of the University was significantly changed after the reorganization in 2025, mandated by Presidential Decree PF-73. This was symbolized by the six Pedagogical Higher Schools, each headed by a dean who has full academic and research, and partnership responsibilities in their school, instead of the previous 14 faculties.

The six Pedagogical Higher Schools are not legal entities, but are academic units of the unified framework of the National Pedagogical University of Uzbekistan. The university is based on the legislative act of the Republic of Uzbekistan in the field of national education and is included in the system of the national education as a subordinate organization of the Ministry of Preschool and School Education of the Republic of Uzbekistan.

== Academics ==
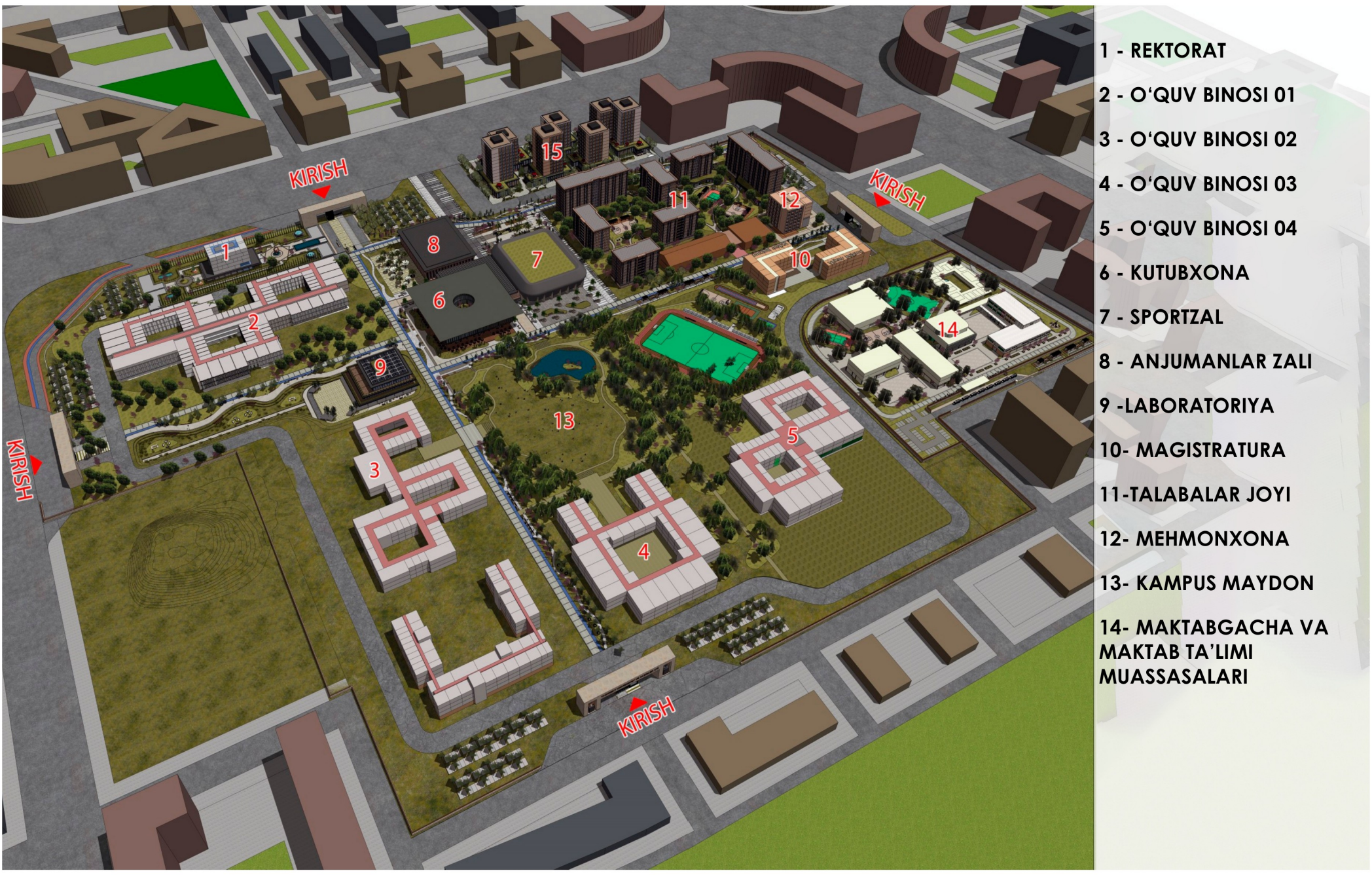
Academic buildings

From the 2025/2026 academic year, the university’s academic structure has been adapted, based on Presidential Decree PF-73 from 28 April 2025, to six Pedagogical Higher Schools. Before this reform, there were 11 teaching faculties at the university: primary education culture, pedagogy, physics and mathematics, natural sciences, history, vocational education, foreign languages, special pedagogy, innovation pedagogy, Russian language and literature, and preschool education, as well as a pre-military training faculty.

== Faculties ==
Exact Sciences — Provides deep training in exact sciences and prepares teachers and researchers.

History — Training specialists in history, cultural studies, and social sciences.

Natural Sciences — Provides training in biology, chemistry, and ecology.

Professional Education and Art — Training specialists in music, fine arts, theater, and cultural studies.

Preschool and Primary Education — Training teachers and methodologists for primary classes, studying psychological-pedagogical foundations of education.

Philology — Training specialists in Uzbek linguistics, literary studies, and teaching methods. The faculty offers 7 programs.

Joint Education — Established on 25 September 2017, under a memorandum between Maxim Tank Belarusian State Pedagogical University and the Nizami National Pedagogical University of Uzbekistan, as the Joint Higher School of Innovative Pedagogy.

Pedagogy, Psychology and Inclusive Education — The faculty comprises 20 doctors of sciences, 35 candidates of sciences, 26 professors, and 34 associate professors, with a scientific potential of 75%.

Military Education — Functions as a military educational unit ensuring the implementation of a continuous educational and training process.

== Undergraduate studies ==
The bachelor's programs of NPUU are provided in the fields of education, humanities, natural sciences, social sciences, and physical culture. Programs are structured according to the national qualification frameworks and/or professional standards based on four years’ full-time undergraduate study, plus two years of intensive English during the first year, and structured professional teaching internships in the third and fourth years of the courses.

Beginning in the academic year 2025/2026, the part-time (correspondence) courses were withdrawn; only part-time (evening) courses are available.

=== Undergraduate Programs (Full-time) ===
No.	Program ID	Field of Study
1	60110100	Pedagogy
2	60110200	Preschool Education
3	60110300	Special Pedagogy: Speech Therapy
4	60110400	Primary Education
5	60110500	Fine Arts & Engineering Graphics
6	60110600	Music Education
7	60110700	Uzbek Language & Literature
8	60110800	Native Language: Russian
9	60110900	Foreign Language: Korean
10	60111000	Military Pre-training
11	60111100	National Idea & Legal Education
12	60111200	Physical Education
13	60111300	Technology Education
14	60220300	History
15	60310300	Psychology
16	60510100	Biology
17	60530100	Chemistry
18	60530200	Geography
19	60530500	Physics
20	601103001	Special Pedagogy: Deaf Education
21	601103002	Special Pedagogy: Intellectual Disability
22	601103003	Special Pedagogy: Sign Interpreting
23	601108001	Native Language: Kazakh
24	601109001	Foreign Language: English
25	601109002	Foreign Language: German

=== Undergraduate Programs (Evening) ===
No.	Program ID	Field of Study
1	60110100	Pedagogy
2	60110200	Preschool Education
3	60110400	Primary Education
4	60110700	Uzbek Language & Literature
5	60310300	Psychology

=== Undergraduate Programs (Distance) ===
No.	Program ID	Field of Study
1	60530500	Physics

== Graduate Studies ==
The University has master's degree programs such as pedagogy, psychology, teaching methodologies of the subject, and educational management. Master's programs are compulsory additional courses that further the undergraduate curriculum and qualify the student for leading roles within an education institution, teaching and research units, and in politics.

=== Graduate Programs (Full-time) ===
No.	Program ID	Field of Study
1	70110102	Pedagogy
2	70110101	Pedagogy Theory & History
3	70110103	Testology & Assessment
4	70110201	Teaching Methods (Preschool)
5	70110301	Special Pedagogy: Speech Therapy
6	701103011	Special Pedagogy: Deaf Education
7	701103012	Special Pedagogy: Intellectual Disability
8	70110401	Teaching Methods (Primary)
9	70110501	Fine Arts
10	70110502	Engineering Graphics & Design
11	70110601	Music Education & Art
12	70110701	Uzbek Language & Literature
13	70110801	Native Language: Russian
14	701108011	Native: Russian & Literature
15	70110901	Foreign Language: English
16	701109011	Foreign Language: Korean
17	70111001	Teaching Methods (Military)
18	70111101	Social-Humanitarian (Spirituality)
19	70111102	Social-Humanitarian (Law)
20	70111201	Physical Education Theory
21	70111301	Teaching Methods (Technology)
22	70220303	Social-Humanitarian (History)
23	70310301	Psychology
24	70510105	Exact Sciences (Biology)
25	70530104	Exact Sciences (Chemistry)
26	70530203	Exact Sciences (Geography)
27	70530510	Exact Sciences (Physics)
28	70540104	Exact Sciences (Mathematics)
29	70610103	Information Systems
30	70610105	IT in Education

=== Graduate Programs (Distance) ===
No.	Program ID	Field of Study
1	70110102	Pedagogy
2	70310301	Psychology
3	70610105	IT in Education

== Admissions ==
The NPUU Academy is accepted based on the state testing system of Uzbekistan (Davlat test markazi), which is universal in the country. Admission of prospective students depends on the results of the national entrance tests and requires a secondary education diploma. Students are admitted based on the results of national entrance tests and a completed secondary education diploma.

International students can submit an application online via the university's website using a university-designed application form, including personal information, academic transcripts, and supporting documents.

== Rectors ==
- A.Zargarov – 1935-1938y
- A.Usmonov – 1938-1940y
- M.Karimov – 1940-1943y
- T.Alimova – 1943-1946y
- A.Islomov – 1946-1951y
- Shopulat Abdullayevich – 1951-1971y
- Nuriddinov Zuhriddin Rasulovich – 1971-1976y
- Tursunov Xabib Tursunovich – 1976-1979y
- Tursunmuxamedov Sattor Pozilxaqovich – 1979-1983y
- Abdurahmanov G’ani Abduraxmonovich – 1983-1988y
- Yusupov Komil Yusupovich – 1988-1990, 1992-1994y
- Zoidov Mirg’iyos Abbosovich – 1991-1992y
- Qodirov Bahrom G’ofurovich – 1994-2005y
- Muxamedov G’ofur Isroilovich – 2005-2006y
- Begimqulov Uzoqboy Shoyimqulovich – 2006-2009y
- Haydarov Fazliddin Ikramovich – 2009-2011y
- Inayatov Ulug’bek Ilyosovich – 2011-2013y
- Sharipov Shavkat Safarovich – 2013-2020y
- Umarov Alisher Yusubjanovich – 2020-2021y
- Qirg’izboyev Abdug’affor Karimjonovich – 2021-2025y
- Karimova E’zozxon Gafurjanovna – 2025y
- Umarova Khilola Uktamovna – 2026-h.v.

== Rankings ==
The National Pedagogical University of Uzbekistan is ranked joint 35th in the QS Asia University Rankings — Central Asia, 588th in the QS Asia University Rankings overall, 401-600th in the Times Higher Education Impact Rankings, and 978th in the UI GreenMetric World University Rankings 2025. In the 2025 UI GreenMetric rankings, NPUU achieved a total score of 5,260 points across seven sustainability categories: Setting & Infrastructure (635), Energy & Climate Change (1,050), Waste (875), Water (587.5), Transportation (1,112.5), and Education & Research (1,000). The university is among 38 Uzbek higher education institutions that secured positions in the top 1,000 of the 2025 rankings, which evaluated 1,745 universities from 105 countries.

== International Cooperation ==
From the 2025/2026 academic year, the university has been introducing bilingual international education programs across all fields of study, and international curricula and assessment systems are being phased in as part of its strategic goal to attain global university status.

A total of over 200 Memoranda of Understanding have been signed between foreign partner universities, institutions, and organizations from 20+ countries all over the world. The university's international cooperation primarily focuses on joint research projects, academic exchange programs, and scholarly collaboration with partner institutions worldwide.

== Costs ==
As a public university operating under the Ministry of Higher Education, Science and Innovation of the Republic of Uzbekistan, NPUU charges tuition fees in line with national tariffs set by the government. Tuition fees generally range between approximately $1,100 and $1,300 per academic year, depending on the field of study and student status.

== Campus Life ==
=== Student Media and Publications ===
The National Pedagogical University of Uzbekistan publishes the following academic and informational outlets:

- NPUU Scientific Information Journal — Scientific News of Uzbek National Pedagogical University, a scientific-theoretical journal.
- "Pedagogy" Journal — A scientific journal on pedagogical sciences.
- "Pedagog" Newspaper — The official informational and educational print publication of the university.
- "History of Central Asia" Journal — An international scientific journal on current issues of Central Asian history.

== Notable people ==
=== Alumni ===
- Mazluma Asqarova — Graduated from the Faculty of Uzbek Language and Literature of the Tashkent Pedagogical Institute (1944).
- Mallayev Natan Murodovich — Graduated from Tashkent State Pedagogical Institute (1942).
- Said Ahmad — Graduated from Tashkent State Pedagogical Institute (1940).
- Zulfiya — Graduated from Tashkent State Pedagogical Institute (1931).
- Nabiyev Malik Nabiyevich — Taught at the Nizami Tashkent State Pedagogical University from 1958 until the end of his life.
- G'afur G'ulom — Graduated from Tashkent State Pedagogical Institute.
- Mavlonova Rahima Abdurazzaqovna — Graduated from the Faculty of Primary Education Methodology and Psychology of the Nizami Tashkent State Pedagogical Institute.
- Po'lat Habibullayev — Served as Head of the Physics Department of the Nizami Tashkent State Pedagogical Institute from 1964 to 1971.
- G'ulomov Yaxyo G'ulomovich — Taught history and archaeology of Uzbekistan at the Nizami Tashkent State Pedagogical Institute.
- Maqsud Shayxzoda — Taught the history of Uzbek literature at the Tashkent State Pedagogical Institute named after Nizami from 1938 until the end of his life.

== Faculty ==
The National Pedagogical University of Uzbekistan has a teaching staff of more than 790 faculty members.
