= Suyunchi =

1982 Uzbek drama film

Suyunchi/Суюнчи
- A poster in Uzbek
- Directed by: Melis Abzalov
- Written by: Rihsivoy Muhammadjonov
- Starring: Zaynab Sadriyeva; Gʻani Aʼzamov; Ikroma Boltayeva; Xusan Sharipov; Abduraim Abduvahobov; Jalol Yusupov; Oybek Narzullayev; Shahnoza Hamroyeva; Noila Toshkanboyeva; Mahsum Yusupov; Nurmuxan Janturin; Abror Tursunov
- Music by: Mirhalil Mahmudov
- Production company: Uzbekfilm
- Release date: September 5, 1982
- Running time: 70 minutes
- Countries: Uzbek SSR, USSR
- Language: Uzbek

Suyunchi or Babushka-general (transliteration of the Russian title of the film) (Uzbek: Suyunchi, Суюнчи; Russian: Бабушка-генерал) is a 1982 Uzbek drama film directed by Melis Abzalov.

== Plot ==
Anzirat, an elderly woman, lives in a small village in Soviet Uzbekistan with her son, daughter-in-law, and their ten children, all boys. Because of her strictness the villagers call Anzirat "Grandma-General".

Back in the 1930s, Anzirat headed the main farm of the village and went through many hardships. Even when she gets old, Anzirat does not want to rest and cannot put up with the laziness, greed, and negligence of some of the villagers. She tries to put things in order for her family. Her son, however, instead of helping his pregnant wife spends all his spare time building a family football team. Only after Anzirat's death do the residents of the village realize how empty their village is without her. They feel that Anzirat was the conscience of their village.

== Reception ==
The film is considered to be part of the Golden age of Uzbek national cinema.

"In Suyunchi, (Abzalov) skillfully presents concepts of honesty, modesty, respect, and honor towards elders, as well as family values and relationships, through gentle humor, aimed at entertaining the audience." wrote Mukhayо Mukhtarova.
