= Virgin Soil Upturned (1939 film) =

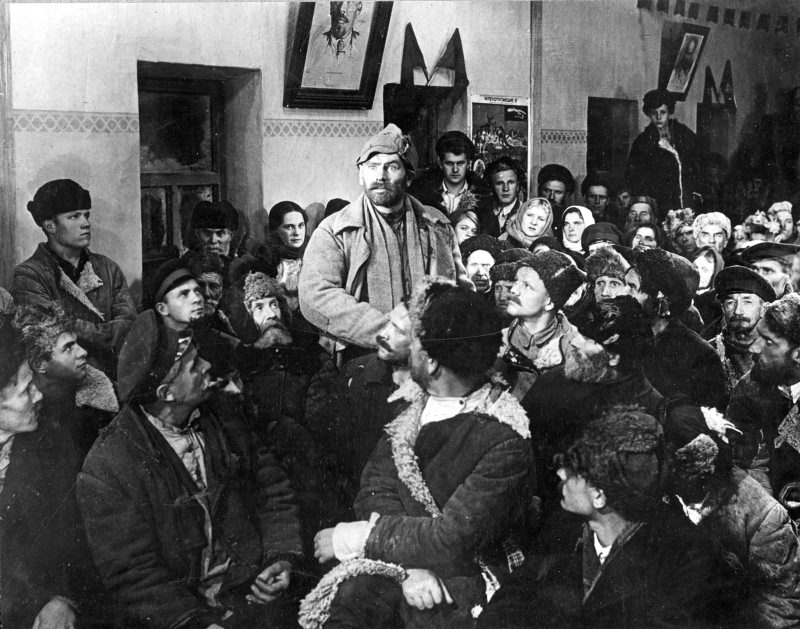
- Russian: Поднятая целина
- Directed by: Yuli Raizman
- Written by: Mikhail Sholokhov (novel); Sergei Yermolinsky
- Starring: Gavriil Belov; Sergei Blinnikov; Mikhail Bolduman; Boris Dobronravov; Vladimir Dorofeyev; Aleksandr Khokhlov
- Cinematography: Leonid Kosmatov
- Music by: Georgy Sviridov
- Production company: Mosfilm
- Release date: 1939
- Running time: 118 min.
- Country: Soviet Union
- Language: Russian

Virgin Soil Upturned (Russian: Поднятая целина, romanized: Podnyataya tselina) is a 1939 Soviet drama film directed by Yuli Raizman.

== Plot ==
In January 1930, during the period of collectivization, Semyon Davydov, a former sailor and communist-twenty-five-thousander who had previously worked at a Leningrad factory, arrives at the village of Gremyachy Log to oversee the establishment of a collective farm. There, he meets Makar Nagulnov, the head of the local party cell, and Andrei Razmyotnov, chairman of the village council. Together, the party members organize a meeting of the village's activists and poor farmers. During the gathering, many villagers register to join the collective farm, while identifying wealthier farmers to be targeted for dekulakization. However, the more prosperous farmers resist joining the collective farm, and by the end of February, enrollment ceases. Meanwhile, secret gatherings of discontented individuals plot to undermine the collectivization efforts.

Under pressure from central authorities to accelerate the process, Davydov and his team work tirelessly to overcome the challenges posed by the village's middle-class farmers, sabotage, and inefficiencies. Despite the obstacles, the Gremyachy Log collective farm is eventually established. At a meeting of the newly-formed collective, Davydov is elected chairman, and Ostronov is appointed supply manager. The villagers begin their first fieldwork as a collective, plowing fields manually and using oxen for harrowing. The film portrays their initial struggles to adapt to the new system and improve productivity amidst ongoing resistance.

The story concludes with a hopeful message about progress and modernization. Over time, the collective farm sees the arrival of machinery, symbolized by the tractors that Ded Shchukar, an elderly villager, had dreamed of. In the final scene, the tractors work the fields under the stirring music of composer Georgy Sviridov, marking the triumph of collectivization and the transformation of the village.

== Cast ==
- Gavriil Belov as Ostrovnov
- Sergei Blinnikov as Bannik
- Mikhail Bolduman as Nagulnov
- Boris Dobronravov as Davydov
- Vladimir Dorofeyev as grandfather Shchukar
- Aleksandr Khokhlov as Polovtsev
- Yelena Maksimova as Malanya Atamanchukova
