= Uzbekfilm =

Film studio in Uzbekistan

- Type: Corporation
- Industry: Motion pictures Animated films
- Founded: 1925
- Headquarters: Tashkent, Uzbekistan
- Products: Motion pictures Television programs

Uzbekfilm (Uzbek: Oʻzbekfilm, Ўзбекфильм; Russian: Узбекфильм) is the largest and oldest film studio in Uzbekistan. It was established on July 1, 1925.

The company was initially called Sharq Yulduzi (Eastern Star). In 1936, it was renamed to Uzbekfilm. During the Soviet-German war against Nazi Germany and its allies, the company was called Tashkent Film Studio. In 1958, it was renamed back to Uzbekfilm.

Since its founding Uzbekfilm has produced about 400 feature films and 100 animated films. Some of the most popular films produced by Uzbekfilm include Maftuningman (1958), Mahallada duv-duv gap (1960), Yor-yor (1964), Shum bola (1977), Zestoke godine (1978), Toʻylar muborak (1978), Suyunchi (1982), Kelinlar qoʻzgʻoloni (1984), Armon (1986), and Abdullajon (1991).

In 1966, at Uzbekfilm studio, Samig Abdukakhkhar and Anatoly Kobulov created the satirical newsreel "Nashtar" ("Scalpel"), comprising fictional or documentary novellas and cartoons, aimed at combating social vices through satire and humor.

After Uzbekistan became independent in 1991, the Uzbek government took full control of the studio. In 1996, Uzbekfilm was turned into an open joint-stock company. Currently, the studio produces half a dozen feature-length films a year.

== See also ==
- Cinema of Uzbekistan
