= Kareem =

- Gender: Male (Female: Karima)

Origin
- Origin: Arabic
- Meaning: Generous, noble, honorable

Kareem or Karim (Arabic: کریم) is a masculine given name and surname of Arabic origin that means "generous", "noble", or "honourable"; it is also one of the Names of God in Islam. The feminine form is Karima. Notable people with the name include:

== Given name ==
=== Kareem ===
- Kareem Abdul-Jabbar (born 1947), American basketball player
- Kareem Abdul-Jabbar Jr. (born 1976), American actor and basketball player
- Kareem Abeed (born 1984), Syrian film producer
- Kareem Tajudeen Abisodun, Nigerian politician
- Kareem Mohamed Abu-Elmagd (born 1952), Egyptian-American surgeon
- Kareem James Abu-Zeid (born 1981), Egyptian-American translator, editor, and writer
- Kareem Adepoju, Nigerian film actor, writer, and producer
- Kareem Ahmed (born 2007), Egyptian footballer
- Kareem Al Allaf (born 1998), American tennis player
- Kareem Amer (born 1984), Egyptian blogger
- Kareem El-Badry (born 1994), American astronomer and astrophysicist
- Kareem Brown (born 1983), American football player
- Kareem Burke (born 1974), American entrepreneur and record executive
- Kareem Campbell (born 1973), American skateboarder
- Kareem Daniel (born 1974), American businessman
- Kareem Ferguson, American actor
- Kareem Foster (born 2000), Caymanian footballer
- Kareem Bux Gabol, Pakistani politician
- Kareem Huggins (born 1986), American football player
- Kareem Hunt (born 1995), American football player
- Kareem Irfan, American activist
- Kareem Jackson (born 1988), American football player
- Kareem Jamar (born 1992), American basketball player
- Kareem Joseph (born 1983), Trinidadian footballer
- Kareem Kazeem (born 1988), Nigerian footballer
- Kareem Kelly (born 1981), American football player
- Kareem Rashad Sultan Khan (1987–2007), American soldier
- Kareem Khubchandani, American researcher, performance artist, and organizer
- Kareem Larrimore (born 1976), American football player
- Kareem Lopez (born 1990), Mexican musician and singer
- Kareem Maddox (born 1989), American basketball player
- Kareem Marcelle (born 1995), Trinidadian politician
- Kareem Martin (born 1992), American football player
- Kareem McKenzie (born 1979), American football player
- Kareem Moore (born 1984), American football player
- Kareem Mortimer (born 1980), Bahamian filmmaker
- Kareem Moses (born 1990), Trinidadian footballer
- Kareem Musa, Belizean politician
- Kareem Olamilekan (born 2006/07), Nigerian artist
- Kareem Omolaja (born 1990), Nigerian footballer
- Kareem Orr (born 1997), American football player
- Kareem Queeley (born 2001), Kittitian-British basketball player
- Kareem Rahma (born 1986), Egyptian-American comedian
- Kareem Reid (born 1975), American basketball player
- Kareem Richardson (born 1974), American basketball coach
- Kareem Rosser (born 1998), American polo player and author
- Kareem Roustom, Syrian-American composer, music director, and university teacher
- Kareem Rush (born 1980), American basketball player
- Kareem Salama, Egyptian-American musician
- Kareem Serageldin (born 1973), American banking executive convicted of fraud
- Kareem Smith (born 1985), American-Trinidadian footballer
- Kareem Sow (born 2000), Canadian footballer
- Kareem Streete-Thompson (born 1973), Caymanian-American athlete
- Kareem Tunde (born 2005), Spanish footballer
- Kareem Valentine (born 1992), Antiguan swimmer
- Kareem Walker (born 1998), American football player

=== Karim ===
- Karim Abdelrahim (born 1992), Egyptian handball player
- Karim Abdul (born 1992), Cameroonian basketball player
- Karim Abokahla (born 1996), Egyptian weightlifter
- Karim Abubakar (born 1995), Ghanaian footballer
- Karim Achahbar (born 1996), French-Moroccan footballer
- Karim Achoui (born 1967), French-Algerian lawyer
- Karim Adeyemi (born 2002), German footballer
- Karim Adiprasito (born 1988), German mathematician
- Karim Ahmadi (born 1986), Iranian footballer
- Karim El Ahmadi (born 1985), Dutch-Moroccan footballer
- Karim Uddin Ahmed (1923–1991), Bangladesh politician
- Karim Aïnouz (born 1966), Brazilian film director and visual artist
- Karim Aït-Fana (born 1989), French-Moroccan footballer
- Karim Alami (born 1973), Moroccan tennis player
- Karim Alhassan (born 1991), Ghanaian footballer
- Karim Allawi (born 1960), Iraqi footballer
- Karim Alrawi (born 1964), Egyptian writer
- Karim Amer (born 1983), Egyptian-American film producer and director
- Karim Ansarifard (born 1990), Iranian football player
- Karim Aouadhi (born 1986), Tunisian footballer
- Karim al-Din Aqsarayi, Persian historian and bureaucrat
- Karim Aribi (born 1994), Algerian footballer
- Karim Asir (born 1994), Afghan mime artist
- Karim Said Atmani, Moroccan terror suspect
- Karim Attoumani (born 2001), French-Comorian footballer
- Karim Azamoum (born 1990), French footballer
- Karim Abdel Aziz (born 1975), Egyptian actor
- Karim Mahmoud Abdel Aziz (born 1985), Egyptian actor
- Karim Azizou (born 1985), Moroccan footballer
- Karim Azkoul (1915–2003), Lebanese diplomat and philosopher
- Karim Bagheri (born 1974), Iranian footballer
- Karim Baïteche (born 1991), Algerian footballer
- Karim Bakhti (born 1969), Algerian footballer
- Karim Bambo (born 1993), Egyptian footballer
- Karim Bangoura (1926–1972), Guinean diplomat
- Karim Bannani (born 1998), Dutch footballer
- Karim Uddin Barbhuiya (born 1970), Indian politician
- Karim Bardeesy, Canadian politician
- Karim Bavi (1964–2022), Iranian footballer
- Karim Belghini (born 1993), Algerian karateka
- Karim Belhocine (born 1978), French football coach and player
- Karim Bellarabi (born 1990), German footballer
- Karim Benarif (born 1993), Moroccan footballer
- Karim Benbrahim (born 1980), French politician
- Karim Bencherifa (born 1968), Moroccan football manager and player
- Karim Benkouar (born 1979), Moroccan footballer
- Karim Bennani (1936–2023), Moroccan painter
- Karim Bennani (presenter) (born 1983), French radio host and sports journalist
- Karim Bennani (tennis) (born 2007), Moroccan tennis player
- Karim Bennoui (born 1988), Algerian Muay Thai kickboxer
- Karim Benounes (born 1984), Algerian footballer
- Karim Benyamina (born 1981), Algerian-German footballer
- Karim Benzema (born 1987), French footballer
- Karim Berdi (died 1417), Khan of the Golden Horde
- Karim El Berkaoui (born 1995), Moroccan footballer
- Karim Betina, Algerian Paralympian athlete
- Karim Uddin Bharsha (died 2022), Bangladeshi entrepreneur and politician
- Karim Bianchi (born 1983), Chilean politician
- Karim Bitar (1965–2025), American businessman
- Karim Boostani (born 1952), Iranian football coach and player
- Karim Bouamrane (born 1973), French businessman and politician
- Karim Boudiaf (born 1990), Algerian-Qatari footballer
- Karim Boudjema (born 1988), French-Algerian footballer
- Karim Bougherara (born 1989), French-Algerian rugby union player
- Karim Boukraa (born 1973), French footballer
- Karim Bourti, French-Algerian terrorism convict
- Karim Boutadjine (born 1989), French-Algerian footballer
- Karim Bouzida (born 1972), Moroccan PR agent
- Karim Bridji (born 1981), Algerian footballer
- Karim Brohi (born 1968), British surgeon
- Karim Bujang (1953–2026), Malaysian politician
- Karim Bukele (born 1986), Salvadoran businessman and politician
- Karim Bux (1865–??), Indian wrestler
- Karim Buzarjomehri (1886–1952), Iranian military general
- Karim Camara (born 1971), American pastor and politician
- Karim Chaban (born 2000), French-Algerian footballer
- Karim Chaibai (born 1982), Belgian futsal player
- Karim Chammari (born 1966), Tunisian windsurfer
- Karim Braham Chaouch (born 1978), Algerian footballer
- Karim Ben Cheïkh (born 1977), Tunisian-French politician
- Karim Chishti (1936–2010), Indian cricketer
- Karim Cissé (born 2004), Guinean footballer
- Karim Conté (born 1999), Guinean footballer
- Karim Coulibaly (footballer, born 1993) (born 1993), French-Senegalese footballer
- Karim Coulibaly (footballer, born 2007) (born 2007), German footballer
- Karim Dahou (born 1982), Moroccan footballer
- Karim Darwich (born 1998), German-Lebanese footballer
- Karim Darwish (politician) (born 1965), Egyptian politician and lawyer
- Karim Darwish (squash player) (born 1981), Egyptian squash player
- Karim Debbagh (born 1972), Moroccan film producer
- Karim El Debes (born 2003), Egyptian footballer
- Karim El Deeb (born 1995), Egyptian footballer
- Karim Dembélé (1939–2010), Malian soldier and politician
- Karim Coulibaly Diaby (born 1989), Ivorian footballer
- Karim Diané (born 2002), American actor and singer
- Karim Diniyev (born 1993), Azerbaijani footballer
- Karim Séga Diouf (died 2019), Senegalese football manager
- Karim Djeballi (born 1983), French footballer
- Karim Djoudi (1953–2022), Algerian politician
- Karim Dridi, French-Tunisian film director and screenwriter
- Karim Eddafi, Moroccan footballer
- Karim Diaa Eddin, Egyptian film director and actor
- Karim Elsayed (born 1995), Egyptian canoeist
- Karim Emami (1930–2005), Iranian translator, editor, lexicographer, and literary critic
- Karim El Eraki (born 1997), Egyptian footballer
- Karim Eslami (born 1986), Iranian footballer
- Karim Essediri (born 1979), French-Tunisian footballer
- Karim Essikal (born 1996), Moroccan footballer
- Karim Fachtali (born 1988), Dutch-Moroccan footballer
- Karim Fakhrawi (1962–2011), Bahraini publisher
- Karim Ali Fathy (born 1993), Egyptian squash player
- Karim Fegrouche (born 1982), Moroccan footballer
- Karim Fellahi (born 1974), French footballer
- Karim Findi (born 1946), Iraqi author
- Karim Fouad (born 1999), Egyptian footballer
- Karim Fradin (born 1972), French football executive and player
- Karim Franceschi (born 1989), Moroccan-Italian activist, writer, and soldier
- Karim García (born 1975), Mexican baseball player
- Karim Gawad (born 1991), Egyptian squash player
- Karim Gazzetta (1995–2022), Swiss footballer
- Karim Ghajji (born 1981), French-Moroccan kickboxer and B-boy
- Karim Ghanbari (born 1967), Iranian football manager
- Karim Ghani, Burmese politician
- Karim Ghazi (born 1979), Algerian footballer
- Karim Ghellab (born 1966), Moroccan politician
- Karim Girayev (born 1997), Russian footballer
- Karim Guédé (born 1985), German footballer
- Karim Guerfi (born 1987), French-Algerian boxer
- Karim Habib (born 1970), Lebanese automotive designer
- Karim Haddad (born 1962), Lebanese composer
- Karim Hadi (born 1963), Iraqi footballer
- Karim Hadjbouzit (born 1991), Algerian racing cyclist
- Karim Ali Hadji (born 1981), Algerian footballer
- Karim Hafez (born 1996), Egyptian footballer
- Karim Haggui (born 1984), Tunisian footballer
- Karim Hakimi (born 1933), Iranian-Canadian entrepreneur and optician
- Karim Halim (1918–1989), Indonesian literary writer
- Karim El Hammamy (born 1995), Egyptian squash player
- Karim Handawy (born 1988), Egyptian handball player
- Karim El Hany (born 1988), French footballer
- Karim Hasni, Algerian politician
- Karim Hendou (born 1986), Algerian footballer
- Karim Hirji (born 1950), Ugandan businessman
- Karim Hisami (1926–2001), Iranian writer
- Karim Allawi Homaidi (1928–2023), Iraqi footballer
- Karim Hossam (born 1994), Egyptian tennis player
- Karim Hussain (born 1975), Canadian filmmaker and cinematographer
- Karim El Idrissi (born 1977), French-Moroccan footballer
- Karim Al Iraqi (1955–2023), Iraqi poet
- Karim Khan Iravanski (1885–1919), Azerbaijani military officer
- Karim Izrailov (born 1987), Kyrgyz footballer
- Karim Jaafar, Iraqi footballer
- Karim Jallow (born 1997), Gambian-German basketball player
- Karim Jamal, Canadian accountant and academic
- Karim Janat (born 1998), Afghan cricketer
- Karim Kaddour (born 1983), Algerian footballer
- Karim Kamalov (1954–2020), Uzbek politician
- Karim Kamanzi (born 1983), Rwandan footballer
- Karim Khan Kangarlu, Khan of the Nakhichevan khanate
- Karim al-Din Karaman (1221–1263), Karamanid ruler
- Karim H. Karim, American Islamic studies scholar
- Karim Kassem (born 1986), Egyptian actor
- Karim Kawar (born 1966), Jordanian businessman
- Karim Keira (born 1985), Guinean politician
- Karim Keïta (born 1979), Malian politician
- Karim El-Kerem (born 1987), Spanish actor
- Karim Kerkar (born 1977), Algerian footballer
- Karim Khan Kermani (1810–1873), Iranian Twelver Shia scholar
- Karim Khakimov (1890–1938), Soviet revolutionary and diplomat
- Karim Khalaf (1937–1985), Palestinian attorney and politician
- Karim Khalili (born 1950), Afghan politician
- Karim Ahmad Khan (born 1970), British lawyer
- Karim M. Khan, Australian medical researcher
- Karim Shah Khan (1919–??), Afghan painter
- Karim Ahmed Khawaja, Pakistani politician
- Karim El-Khebir (born 1974), Nigerien footballer
- Karim Khodapanahi (born 1941), Iranian politician
- Karim Khoram (born 1963), Afghan politician
- Karim Khouda (born 1971), French football manager
- Karim Khudsiani (born 1979), Iranian screenwriter, television presenter, and actor
- Karim Kimvuidi (born 2002), Congolese footballer
- Karim Konaté (born 2004), Ivorian footballer
- Karim Laghouag (born 1975), French equestrian
- Karim R. Lakhani, Indian-American academic
- Karim Lala (1911–2002), Afghan-Indian gangster
- Karim Lancina (born 1987), Nigerien footballer
- Karim Laribi (born 1991), Italian footballer
- Karim Leklou (born 1982), French actor
- Karim López (born 2007), Mexican basketball player
- Karim Samir Lotfy (born 1989), Egyptian high jumper
- Karim Loukili (born 1997), Dutch-Moroccan footballer
- Karim Maamoun (born 1979), Egyptian tennis player
- Karim-Mohamed Maamoun (born 1991), Egyptian tennis player
- Karim El-Mahouab (born 1966), Algerian handball player
- Karim Malpica (born 1978), Puerto Rican basketball player
- Karim Mamdouh (born 1993), Egyptian footballer
- Karim Mammadbeyov (1899–1938), Soviet revolutionary and politician
- Karim Mané (born 2000), Senegalese-Canadian basketball player
- Karim Mansh (born 2004), Egyptian footballer
- Karim Mansor (born 1958), Malaysian politician
- Karim Maroc (born 1958), Algerian footballer
- Karim Masroor (born 1955), Iranian footballer
- Karim Massimov (born 1965), Kazakh politician
- Karim Matmour (born 1985), Algerian footballer
- Karim Mayfield (born 1980), American boxer
- Karim Meckassoua (born 1953), Central African politician
- Karim bey Mehmandarov (1854–1929), Soviet medical doctor
- Karim el-Mejjati (1967–2005), Moroccan-French convicted terrorist
- Karim Mekkaoui (born 2001), Lebanese footballer
- Karim Meliani (born 1987), French footballer
- Karim Miské (born 1964), Mauritanian-French documentary film maker and writer
- Karim Akbari Mobarakeh (1953–2020), Iranian actor and film director
- Karim Mohamed (born 2001), French-Comorian footballer
- Karim Mohammedzadeh (1963–1990), Iranian dissident
- Karim Abdel Mohsen (born 1979), Egyptian water polo player
- Karim Mojtahedi (1930–2024), Iranian philosophy professor
- Karim Morani, Indian film producer
- Karim Mossaoui (born 1988), Dutch footballer
- Karim El Mourabet (born 1987), French footballer
- Karim Moussaoui (born 1976), Algerian film director, screenwriter, cinematographer, and actor
- Karim Mouzaoui (born 1975), French-Algerian footballer
- Karim al-Mulla (1942–2026), Iraqi politician
- Karim Munch (born 1989), Egyptian footballer
- Karim Nagi, Egyptian musician, composer, ethnic dance artist, and DJ
- Karim Nayernia, Iranian biomedical scientist
- Karim Nizigiyimana (born 1989), Burundian footballer
- Karim Noureldin (born 1967), Swiss artist
- Karim Ojjeh (born 1965), Saudi businessman and racing driver
- Karim Olowu (1924–2019), Nigerian sprinter and long jumper
- Karim Onisiwo (born 1992), Austrian footballer
- Karim Ouattara (born 1979), Malian-French basketball player
- Karim El Ouazghari (born 1979), Spanish boxer
- Karim Ouazzane, British computer scientist
- Karim Ouchikh (born 1965), French politician
- Karim Ouellet (1984–2021), Senegalese-Canadian singer-songwriter
- Karim Oumarou (born 1985), Nigerien footballer
- Karim Van Overmeire (born 1964), Belgian politician
- Karim Pakradouni (born 1944), Lebanese-Armenian politician
- Karim Patwa (born 1968), Swiss-English film director and screenwriter
- Karim Prince, American actor
- Karim Qavami (born 1950), Iranian Army general
- Karim Raeisinia (born 1930), Iranian wrestler
- Karim Rashid (born 1960), Egyptian industrial designer
- Karim Rassi (born 1967), Lebanese politician
- Karim Abdul Razak (born 1956), Ghanaian football coach and player
- Karim Rekik (born 1994), Dutch footballer
- Karim Ressang (born 1955), Dutch swimmer
- Karim Robin (born 1984), French footballer
- Karim Rodriguez (born 1988), Mexican-American basketball player
- Karim Rossi (born 1994), Swiss footballer
- Karim Rouani (born 1982), French footballer
- Karim Sabbagh (born 1961), Lebanese alpine skier
- Karim Saddam (born 1960), Iraqi footballer
- Karim Sadiq (born 1984), Afghan cricketer
- Karim Sadjadpour, American policy analyst
- Karim Sadr (born 1959), Iranian archaeologist
- Karim Safsaf (born 1994), French footballer
- Karim Baylak-oolovich Sagaan-ool (born 1977), Russian scientist and politician
- Karim Saidi (born 1983), Tunisian footballer
- Karim Mahdi Salih, Iraqi politician
- Karim Salman (1965–2020), Iraqi footballer
- Karim Sanjabi (1905–1995), Iranian politician
- Karim Sardarov (born 1974), Azerbaijani Paralympic judoka
- Karim Sène (born 1971), Senegalese athlete
- Karim Shabazz (born 1978), American basketball player
- Karim Shah (died 1813), Bangladeshi religious leader
- Karim Shahabuddin, Pakistani music director
- Karim agha Shakikhanov (1788–1858), Azerbaijani poet and historian
- Karim Shaverdi (born 1983), Iranian footballer
- Karim El Shenawy (born 1985), Egyptian film director
- Karim Shukurov (born 1956), Azerbaijani historian
- Karim Soltani (born 1984), Algerian footballer
- Karim Souchu (born 1979), French basketball player
- Karim Sow (born 2003), Swiss footballer
- Karim Strohmeier (born 1969), Peruvian tennis player
- Karim Sy (born 1971), French businessman
- Karim Tarek (born 1992), Egyptian footballer
- Karim Tarfi (born 1993), Belgian footballer
- Karim Tizouiar (1963–2023), Algerian singer-songwriter, composer, and mandolinist
- Karim Tmimi (born 1996), French footballer
- Karim Touati (born 1985), Tunisian footballer
- Karim Touzani (born 1980), Dutch footballer
- Karim Bibi Triki (born 1968), Algerian politician
- Karim Troussi, French-Moroccan theater director and playwright
- Karim Tulaganov (born 1973), Uzbek boxer
- Karim Vahed, British entomologist
- Karim Valiyev (born 1961), Azerbaijani Army officer
- Karim Vessal, Iranian physician
- Karim Wade (born 1968), Senegalese politician
- Karim Wagih, Egyptian sport shooter
- Karim Walid (born 1997), Egyptian footballer
- Karim Wasfi (born 1972), Iraqi cellist
- Karim Webb (born 1974), American restaurateur
- Karim Naït Yahia (born 1980), Algerian footballer
- Karim Yassen, Iraqi academic
- Karim Yoda (born 1988), French footballer
- Karim Younes (born 1948), Algerian politician and author
- Karim Younis (born 1956), Palestinian-Israeli convicted murderer
- Karim Zaghib (born 1963), Algerian-Canadian electrochemist and materials scientist
- Karim Zaimović (1971–1995), Bosnian writer, journalist, and publicist
- Karim Zand (1924–2017), Iraqi historian and geographer
- Karim Khan Zand (1705–1779), Iranian king
- Karim Zaoui (born 1970), Algerian football manager
- Karim Zaza (born 1975), Danish-Moroccan footballer
- Karim Zedadka (born 2000), French footballer
- Karim Zekri (born 1985), Egyptian footballer
- Karim Zéribi (born 1966), French politician
- Karim Zeroual (born 1993), British actor
- Karim Ziad (born 1966), Algerian musician
- Karim Ziani (born 1982), Algerian footballer
- Karim El-Zoghby (born 1977), Egyptian show jumping rider

== Surname ==
=== Kareem ===
- Khalid Kareem (born 1998), American football player
- Yaqub Kareem, Nigerian boxer

=== Karim ===
- Aasif Karim (born 1963), Kenyan cricketer
- Afsir Karim (1934–2019), Indian Army general and military scholar
- Bavand Karim (born 1979), Iranian-American filmmaker
- Jawed Karim (born 1979), German-American software engineer and internet entrepreneur
- Mahmoud Karim (1916–1999), Egyptian squash player
- Manzoor Ul Karim, Bangladeshi scout and politician
- Mohammed Karim (1896–1972), Egyptian film director
- Mona Karim, Lebanese actress
- Mosharraf Karim (born 1971), Bangladeshi actor
- Musharraf Karim (1946–2020), Bangladeshi writer
- Persis Karim (born 1962), American poet, editor, and educator
- Rashid Karim (1925–2011), Bangladeshi novelist
- Saba Karim (born 1967), Indian cricketer
- Sajjad Karim (born 1970), British politician
- Youssra Karim (born 1997), Moroccan para-athlete

== Fictional characters ==
- Karim family in the BBC soap opera EastEnders
- Kareem Said, a Muslim prisoner in the TV series Oz
- Karim, in the video game Eternal Darkness: Sanity's Requiem
- Karim Bouchtat, a recurring character in the Channel 4 series My Mad Fat Diary
- Karim Denz, a heist crew member in the video game Grand Theft Auto V
- Kareem (Marvel Cinematic Universe), in the Disney+ series Ms. Marvel

== See also ==
- Karie (name)
- Abdul Karim (disambiguation), Arabic theophoric name
- Akram, derived from the Arabic root word K-R-M
- Karimov, Russianized surname
- Kerimov, Russianized surname
