= Karim Darwish =

Karim Darwish may be:

- Karim Darwish (politician), member of the Egyptian parliament
- Karim Darwish (squash player), Egyptian squash player

== See also ==
- Karim Darwich, Lebanese footballer
