= Oumarou =

Oumarou is a surname. Notable people with the surname include:

- Aboubakar Oumarou (born 1987), Cameroonian football player
- Bah Oumarou Sanda, Cameroonian diplomat
- Ide Oumarou (1937–2002), Nigerian diplomat and politician
- Karim Oumarou, Nigerien football player
- Mamane Oumarou (born 1946), Nigerian politician
- Sanda Bouba Oumarou (born 1958), Central African basketball player
- Sanda Oumarou (1982–2021), Cameroonian football player
- Seyni Oumarou (born 1951), Nigerien politician
