= Irfan (name) =

iliyaas
- Pronunciation: Arabic: [ʕɪrfaːn] Persian: [ʔeɾfɒːn] Turkish: [iɾfan]
- Gender: Male
- Language: Arabic

Origin
- Origin: Arabic
- Meaning: "Knowledge", "Awareness" and "Learning"
- Region of origin: Arabia

Other names
- Variant forms: Erfan (Persian), İrfan (Turkish)

Irfan or Erfan (Arabic: عرفان) is a male given name of Arabic origin, used in Arabic, Persian, and Turkish. It is derived from the Arabic word ʿirfān (عرفان), meaning "knowledge", "awareness", or "mystical understanding". In Islamic philosophical traditions, the term irfan is also used in connection with spiritual and mystical knowledge. The name is used worldwide, particularly in the Muslim world. It has several transliterations and spelling variants, including Irfan, Erfan, and Irfaan, depending on the language and system of romanization.

== Given name ==
=== Iliyaas ===
- Irfan Khan (born 1982), Pakistani singer
- Irfan Ahmed (born 1989), Pakistani cricketer
- Irfan Bachdim (born 1988), Indonesian footballer
- İrfan Başaran (born 1989), Turkish footballer
- Irfan Habib (born 1931), Indian Marxist historian of ancient and medieval India
- Irfan Husain (1944–2020), Pakistani writer and journalist
- İrfan Kahveci (born 1995), Turkish footballer
- Irfan Khan (actor) (1967–2020), Indian actor
- Irfan Khoosat (born 1952), Pakistani actor, producer and comedian
- Irfan Ljubijankić (1952–1995), Bosnian doctor and surgeon, classical music composer, politician and diplomat
- Irfan Makki (born 1975), Canadian Muslim singer, songwriter of Pakistani origin
- Irfan Mensur (born Irfan Kurić, 1952), Bosnian theatre, television and film actor
- Irfan Orga (1908–1970), Turkish fighter pilot, staff officer and author
- Irfan Pathan (born 1984), Indian cricketer and Yusuf Pathan's brother
- Irfan Shahid (1926–2016), American orientalist
- Irfan Siddiqui (died 2025), Pakistani politician
- Irfan Škiljan, Bosnian computer scientist and programmer
- Irfan Smajlagić (born 1961), Croatian handball player
- Irfan Talib (born 1986), Pakistani cricketer
- Irfan Toker (born 1972), Turkish judoka
- Irfan Yusuf (born 1969), Pakistani-Australian author

=== Erfan ===
- Erfan Ali (born 1983), Qatari basketball player
- Erfan Hajrasuliha (born 1983), Iranian rapper and producer
- Erfan Nasajpour (born 1984), Iranian-Canadian basketball player
- Erfan Tahmasbi, Iranian musician
- Erfan Zamani (1999–2022), Iranian killed during the Mahsa Amini protests
- Erfan Zeneli (born 1986), Finnish footballer
- Erfan Soltani, arrested in the 2025–2026 Iranian protests and sentenced to death

== Middle name ==
- Mohammad Irfan Ali (born 1985), Indian singer
- Mohd Irfan Fazail (born 1991), Malaysian footballer

== Surname ==
=== Irfan ===
- Kareem Irfan, American Islamic community leader
- Mohammed Irfan (Guantanamo detainee 101) (born 1979)
- Mohammed Irfan (Guantanamo detainee 1006) (born 1982)
- Mohammad Irfan (born 1982), Pakistani cricketer

== See also ==
- Irfan (disambiguation)
