= Our War (2016 film) =

- Official poster
- Italian: La nostra guerra
- Directed by: Bruno Chiaravalloti; Claudio Jampaglia; Benedetta Argentieri
- Written by: Benedetta Argentieri; Claudio Jampaglia
- Starring: Three foreign fighters in Kurdish forces
- Release date: 2016
- Countries: Italy; United States
- Language: English

Our War (Italian: La nostra guerra) is a 2016 Italian-American documentary film directed by Bruno Chiaravalloti, Claudio Jampaglia, and Benedetta Argentieri. It follows the experiences of three foreign volunteers Joshua Bell, a former U.S. Marine, Karim Franceschi, an Italian anti-capitalist activist, and Rafael Kardari, a Swedish bodyguard—who joined the People's Protection Units (YPG), a Kurdish-led militia based in northern Syria, to fight against ISIS.

The documentary combines battlefield footage with personal narratives, offering insight into the motivations, struggles, and psychological impact of the fighters' decisions. It also explores their lives outside the war zone, featuring scenes from their home countries: the United States, Italy, and Sweden.

Our War premiered out of competition at the 73rd Venice International Film Festival and was later showcased at other festivals, including the Stockholm International Film Festival.
