= Young voter turnout in Canada =

Voter turnout in Canada is lowest for young voters. A general decline in electoral participation among the under-35 population has been observed in many democratic countries around the world, especially in Canada. "The youngest age cohort did experience a bump upwards in estimated voter turnout from 37% in the 2004 federal general election to 43.8% for the election that followed, before descending to 37.4% for the 2008 federal general election." Participation in provincial elections for youth aged 18 to 24 was 28% in 2001. However, in the 2005 provincial election, the turnout in this age group increased to 35%. In 2015 youth participation reached a record high at 57.1%. Evidently, low voter turnout of young Canadians has generated a great deal of concern.

"Detailed analyses of electoral participation since the 1968 federal election indicate that much of the decline has been driven by generational replacement."

Indeed, the differences in electoral participation across age groups can be seen as a generation gap phenomenon. "The rate of voter participation declines steadily as one moves from the oldest to the youngest age cohorts." The study by Jon H. Pammett and Lawrence LeDuc employed by Elections Canada reveals just how large the gap between the youngest and oldest voters has become. One explanation for this phenomenon is that one's age can affect one's view as to the relevance of the issues that typically dominate the political agenda. The trend analysis demonstrates that the generation gap applies to specific political issues. "Views on school integration proved the exception to the rule, an exception that is explicable in terms of massive period effects and possibly life-cycle effects operating on the young."

The proportion of Canadians under 15 years of age dropped from 32.5% in 1941 to 17.6% in 2006. In 2015, a statistical milestone was reached, in which the proportion of Canadians over 64 (5.78 million) topped the proportion of those under 15 (5.75 million).

Younger Canadians tend to be less interested in politics: Only one in 20 Canadians between 18 and 30 years of age (in 2000) had ever belonged to a political party, compared with one-third of those over age 60. This has led to concern surrounding the long-term health of democracy, with some suggesting declining rates of youth voting will eventually result in a non-voting majority.

== Young voter turnout factors ==
We might wonder why the youth are not very interested in more traditional types of political participation. Stephen P. Nicholson uses Ricker's suggestion that the outcome of a vote may depend on the agenda. What type of agenda settings are shaping young Canadians? What is the trend in youth civic and political engagement in Canada? To what degree do political activities influence young Canadian voters? How do social differences influence the structure of society? An analysis of basic theoretical reasons behind the low voter turnout of young Canadians was done based on quantitative and qualitative research. The analysis reported some factors that contributed to the unwillingness of youth to vote and to participate in democracy: 1. Social Factors, different implications of youth values from older generation. 2. Institutional Factor, differences in Political discourses. It will highlight demographic trends in Canada and have created this new fixation on age as a major determinant of political participation and public policy. Also, what is the role of newspaper to engage with the young voters? There is no particular reason to attribute low voter turnout to any one factor, though some factors may be more important than others.

== The assessment of political activity ==
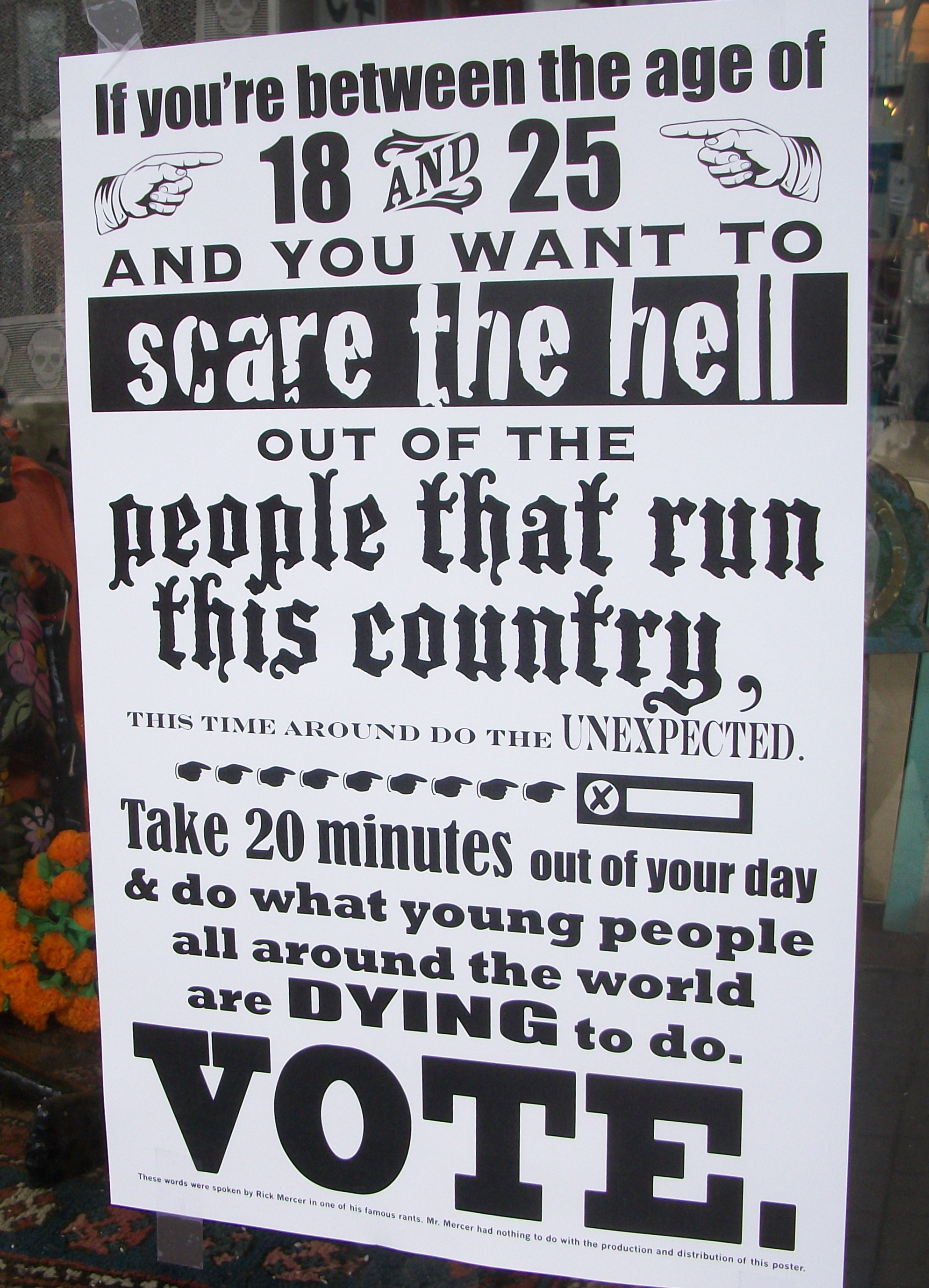
Poster in a shop window in Kensington Market, Toronto, October 2015, during the federal election campaign. It contains the words of political commentator of Rick Mercer.

Canadian electoral participants attribute "turnout decline to negative public attitudes toward the performance of the politicians and political institutions involved in federal politics." Since voting is evidently central to citizens' politics in representative democracies, it is unsurprising that young participants' attitudes to politics were partly shaped by their perceptions of their position in relation to this most basic of political citizenship rights. Indeed, Synthesis Report by Canadian Policy Research Networks reports that youths do not tend to connect the role of government with the issues they think are important.

=== The changing style of political discourse ===
There are roughly four times as many votes registered by seniors than by younger voters. This effect is compounded by dramatic differences in political preferences with seniors being more than twice as likely to favour conservative choices than younger voters. "In a decade or two, the younger voters will be in the prime of their lives and paying for the political choices of their now departed grandparents which are not likely to reflect the priorities or, one could speculate, the needs of next Canada." In other words, this phenomenon is age-related, as there are variations in the personal relevance of the issues that typically dominate the political discourse. Disengagement from the political agenda setting becomes significant as the age of our population rises, but their relative clout has been dramatically magnified by the declining voting rates of younger citizens. The commentary on youth disengagement suggests that "young Canadians are turned off by electoral politics because party platforms and party leaders pay too little attention to the issues that really concerned younger citizens." Nanos Research conducted a survey for individuals aged 18 years or older between August 13 and September 30, 2011, to question, "What is your most important PROVINCIAL issue of concern?" And the research data identifies they mostly concern the health 26.4% from February 2010, 23.2%. And only 16% of those named job/economy as their second most important. The number one issue for young Canadians was health. Another survey was conducted by Elections Canada to pinpoint the most important issue in the election and Canadians aged 18 to over 60 were asked to select the issue that was most important to them personally. One of the common issues was health. Indeed, a striking finding from the survey data is how similar the priorities of Canadians are, regardless of their age. Evidently, Ekos Politics constructed a survey in October 2010 that asked which party you would vote for if a federal election were held tomorrow. The result of Ontario vote intention was Progressive Conservative Party 36.0% and Liberal 34.2% second. However, a year later, the new data justified an adjustment in Ontario 2011 Election from PC 34.0% to Liberal 38.6% since the 2010 elections. According to Ekos Politics, they predicted, "a Liberal majority government, though we observed a last-minute shift to the Progressive Conservative Party, and cautioned that the final outcome was far from certain." The end result of the Ontario election evaluates the notion that people's involvement in alternative political behaviour is central to assessing their level of political interest.

=== Political knowledge and trust ===
"Political knowledge is a democratic value. It is also an important ingredient in democratic citizenship, influencing public attitudes and opinions and, thus political behaviour." Young Canadians display a pattern of civic and political engagement that differentiates them from other aged groups. According to Henry Milner, the political knowledge centralizes to the young voter decline. Brenda O'Neil supports Milner's analysis by saying, "counterintuitively, cynicism toward government and the political system is generally lower among young Canadians than among older ones, and have greater confidence in party leaders and candidates than older generations. Both Milner and O'Neil argue young voter participants have a strong engagement towards the effects on political knowledge. "Voters' lack of political information raises important concerns about contemporary democratic practices." A non-voting or alternative activity "can be a valuable source of political education [which develops] politically relevant knowledge, awareness, understanding and skills." This opens to investigate links with communication insights and the knowledge gap. "First, respondents' knowledge of candidates' and parties' issue positions are key indicators of information gains registered during the course of a campaign." The role of Civic education class is a unique source to inform political parties and government. Taking an education class foreground the young Canadians to engage on an array of important public issues. The identification of political party defines as '"the psychological feeling of attachment of a political party." The authors of the Sourcebook made it clear that party identification "is to be distinguished from such behavior as party registration for primary elections or voting for candidates of a particular party." For instance, in Ontario in 2000 began to educate civic education to inform political backgrounds.

== Values of young Canadians ==
Accordingly, Policy Horizons Canada presents today's young people's interest and statistics of priority in regards to their lives. "Today's young people continue to place a high value on family and work and do not reject the political system in which they live, nor do they demonstrate a massive lack of interest in politics." They add, "census research indicates that youths consider education to be of the utmost importance in opening doors for future employment and assisting them to integrate into society." What are the common values shared between young Canadians? It should be different from the values 10 or 30 or 50 years ago. Why is there a disconnection between youth and today's social institutions? Why do youth values demonstrate a divergence from those of the parents' generation? That is because of "the context of increasing globalization, diversity, and urbanization, and major transformations affecting the family and the labour market."

=== Multiculturalism ===
"Community involvement connected to political engagement."

Particularly, Canadian society is structured based on shared values of family, education, work, the democratic system as well as bilingualism and multiculturalism. Significantly, young adults have differences in values due to educational differences. In addition to educational differences, the globalization in Canada has had a significant effect as well. Globalization traces with trade and cultural exchanges, which expanded to experience international adaptability and web engines to explore differences. "These trends may potentially have an impact on what is valued by youth, such as bilingualism (and even multilingualism) multiculturalism." Perhaps, immigrants' population presents the possibility of changes in youth values as well. In terms of immigrants' population, Citizenship and Immigration Canada categorizes permanent immigrants in Canada by using statistical tables and charts. "Three basic categories of permanent residents, which correspond to major program objectives: reuniting families, contributing to economic development and protecting refugees. Such number of ethnic groups was verified by the statistics of Canada. And age and source areas are categorized to permanent young immigrant residents.Statistically, a top rated ethnic group aged from 15 to 24 years was Asian young immigrants, 65,817 and Africa and the Middle East, 33,239 in second. Furthermore, economic immigrants, aged from 15 to 24 years are Asians, the highest, 62,825 among all aged groups from 0 to 65 years of age or more. Based on the statistics of young immigrants explain the value of multiculturalism is prominent in Canada. "Since urbanization and ethnic diversification in Canadian society result in exposure to different cultures, they many also affect youth values." The result of multiethnic immigrants centralizes multicultural society.

=== Status and socialization ===
"Nearly 7 in 10 university-educated young adults participate in non-voting political behaviour." The other profile of youth value is constructed by status and socialization. As young generation socializes most of the time, it gradually constructs a self-identity. Policy Horizons Canada states "the values of 14 to 19 year old, has formulated a theory that values are first structured at the beginning of adolescence, when there is an initial distancing from the family home, then a second period where the development of values is affected by educational success." Gradually, self-identity shapes in transition to adulthood. In terms of adulthood, young adults' value shift based on experience, a discrepancy between their values and those of society's institutions. Today's young adults are incentives for social and economic factors. CLC President Ken Geogetti was commenting in regards to the latest release from Statistics Canada of its Labour Force Survey for September 2011 that "Too many of our young workers are unemployed, too many of them are stuck in part-time jobs and Ottawa should be paying particular attention to them." Because there were 1,334,200 unemployed Canadians in September and the unemployment rate was 7.1%. While the labour market created a significant number of jobs in September, the unemployment rate among workers aged 15 to 24 was 14.0%, and 48.2% of young workers are employed only part-time." As Frank Graves, reporter of Ekos Politics adds, "We have already seen a run-up in the stock market. Growth may come back later next year, while unemployment is likely to continue getting worse for some time after that." The factual information about economic status persists young adults to consider lower unemployment rates than voting. Personal reasons come first than voting as Gloria Galloway from The Globe And Mail comments, "But many of the respondents also cited personal circumstances. They were too busy, they said, with work, school or family." Respondents from age 22 to 29 with household income of under $20,000 showed less voting behaviour than did those with household income of $60,000 or more. Results show that young voters hold a different set of priorities than their older cohorts. The young adults in low-income households had "almost 50% lower odds of voting than those in high-income households." "Low income was also a predictor of not voting." "You might add the 22.9% (of non-voters) who claimed to be "too busy" to vote"

How demographic of young voter turnouts emerging ethnic diversification factor? "We know that youth are not a monolithic group and have, like older Canadians, multiple identities, but public policies do not adequately respond to their diverse realities and identities." The quotation shows that ethnic diversity strongly engages with unengaged young people from immigrant families who have their own identity. And the statistics of number of immigrants prove that social differences affect young voter declines. It also demonstrates the impact of differences of social class, gender and educational experiences in shaping young people's political orientations and knowledge.

== Political agenda-settings in Canadian newspapers ==
Based on the agenda-setting writing, Robert Hackett, "The News Media and Civic Equality: Watch dogs Mad dogs or Lap Dogs: Democratic Equality: What went wrong?" explains the media's agenda-setting role is a by-product of our collective dependence on mass media for information beyond our direct experience. In other words, political agenda setting in newspaper proposes a specific media's ideology, and characteristics of agenda settings. For that reason, it is prominent to examining a newspaper by understanding the idea of ritual communication that James Carey argues. The idea of ritual communication refers "the transmission of signals or messages over distance for the purpose of control." He suggests that communication explicitly demonstrates culture. That is, the key role of political agenda-setting proposes that projection of community centralizes the role of culture and a ritual view of communication.

=== The problems of political agenda-settings in newspaper ===
In the original Chapel Hill study and many of the studies that have followed, both the media agenda and the public agenda consisted of a set of objects, public issues. However, as Stephen P. Nicholson mentions in Voting The Agenda that McCombs and Shaw (1972) were the first to examine the agenda-setting effect of media on public sphere. Nicholson noted that McCombs and Shaw examined the 1968 US presidential campaign as their setting, and as a result, the authors found that the mass media, as measured by content analysis of media coverage, had a substantial impact on the public's agenda. Nicholson continually demonstrates examples of Lyengar and Kinder (1987), drawing on both experimental and quasi-experimental designs, and also found that media coverage of issues had a significant agenda-setting effect. In what terms are political agenda settings affecting the public through the Canadian newspapers? In the guise of contributing to political agenda settings, the newspapers conduct positive and negative arguments of specific national objects, such as politics, to create specific newspaper advocates. "Newspapers everywhere were now engaged in the hunt for popularity. Contemporaries noted the declining importance of the editorial page in the typical newspaper." For instance, "most major newspapers endorsed the Conservatives, and none solely endorsed the Liberals or Greens. However Canada's highest circulated newspaper, the Toronto Star, advised to vote against the Conservatives." Then it problematizes the range of newspapers covering stories.

=== Canada newspapers coverage on election ===
- The Star's Coverage on election based on their values

The core vision of Toronto Star aims to engage "in the full and frank dissemination of news and opinion, and to do so working within the highest standards of journalistic integrity. In reporting news and opinion, the Star seeks to inform the public of the significant and interesting events of the day, with particular emphasis on politics and public affairs." which the values established by Joseph E. Atkinson, according to Toronto Star Statement of Principles. In addition, Joseph E. Atkinson comments that the principles of The Star are: "A strong and united Canada, civic engagement, individual and civil liberties, a necessary role for effective government and the rights of working people." Atkinson's principles emerge as critical of liberal endorsement in the Canadian context. For instance, The Star paper "usually endorses the Liberal Party federally. The Star was the only major daily to do so in the 2006 and the 2008 federal elections while many of the other major papers endorsed the Conservatives. The Star endorsed the social democratic New Democratic Party (NDP) leader Ed Broadbent in 1979 and Progressive Conservative leader Robert Stanfield in 1972. The paper endorsed the Progressive Conservative Party of Ontario in many of the provincial elections from the 1940s to the 1980s, and endorsed strategic voting to defeat Mike Harris in 1999." The Star traced the role of speaking civil rights of working people and individuals by endorsing the NDP for the 2011 federal election. The Star states, "The platform the NDP offers voters is ambitious and puts people first. It focuses on seniors, health care and the environment…The NDP has never felt the discipline of power at the national level, and it shows." The Star criticized the Liberal Party's campaign under Michael Ignatieff has developed took everyone by surprise, which it was the biggest disappointment ever. Indeed, The Star concludes with "voters who believe Canada should aspire to something greater than the crabbed, narrow vision offered by the Harper Conservatives should look to Jack Layton and the New Democrats on Monday." Results show that Jack Layton was covered much more positively than Conservative and Liberal. The findings also show that respondents linked in the hunt for popularity.

- Reflection of election based on The Globe's ideology principles

A discourse of The Globe and Mail focuses exclusively on voice of the High Class elites agenda issues such as "the Bay Street financial community of Toronto and the intellectuals of university and government institutions." The Globe prevails the range of offerings to attract elites, well educated, and comfortably well-off high-income audience, whom numbered among the nation's agenda setters. The Globe endorses Stephen Harper's Conservative administration since 2008 federal election and 2011 federal elections. The Globe and Mail viewed "Mr. Harper has governed moderately and competently for nearly three years. He has not taken the country in dangerous new directions or significantly eroded the capacity of the government to act, when necessary, in the public interest." Globe also adds "Indeed, the most important characteristic Mr. Harper has shown over 33 months in office is a capacity to grow. There is no reason to think he won't continue along the same trajectory if re-elected — a good thing, too, since there is much more for him to learn." The basis of right wing editorial by The Globe, they praises opinion makers support Conservatives' ambitious efforts to cover their campaigns on newspapers.

== Inequitable values between young Canadians and Canadian newspapers ==
The corresponding of ideology in the Canadian newspapers and young Canadians are not relevantly sharing equal beliefs or information in terms of democracy society. In at least two aspects, the Canadian newspapers obstacle in their duty to foster Young Canadians of voting act: first, the numbers of young Canadian newspaper readerships are very low. Marshall McLuhan said, "People don't actually read newspapers." Statistically, 68% of adults 18-34 read last weekday issue of their community newspapers, compared to only 34% read their last weekday daily newspaper based on Canada demographics conducted by ComBase. In addition to statistics of young adults readership, Tiffany Conroy from Canadian Community Newspapers Association adds,"23% of adults 18-24 read any community newspaper last week, but did not read any daily newspaper." A result of not reading daily newspaper is very hard to retain exclusive issues. The issue of not reading daily newspaper has strong relations to less engaged to act of voting. "The newspaper is the direct result of a national campaign by publishers, known as "Newspapers in Education" (NIE) according to Nola Kortner Aiex. As American Newspaper Publishers Association Foundation proposes "The Newspaper as an Effective Teaching Tool" (1981) explains the intent of the program and provides a variety of classroom activities using newspapers." The role of newspaper is significantly used for young adults as Aiex debates on Using Newspapers as Effective Teaching Tool. Second, the newspapers allow political debate to be monopolized by ideologues who adhere dogmatically to their respective political catechisms. As Robert A. Hackett argues the notions like propaganda and indoctrination are implied to manipulate and persuade in news media. Based on the evidence of The Star and Globe political agenda-settings presented, it would be premature to talk of a crisis of representing election campaign. "We cover the campaigns more than the election. We cover the narrative of the day-to-day event. We cover the news. The problem is there isn't actually whole a lot of news in the campaign." declared Andrew Coyne, national editor, MacLean's magazine who discussed newspaper coverage of the election campaign including narrative-setting, agendas, bias, and spin on September 27, 2011, at University of Toronto, St.Michael's College class with Dr. Gerald Caplan, political columnist at Globe and Mail. They also argued that a lot of coverage unfortunately is aimed at political gentlemen. Moreover, they talked about how well newspapers are focusing the issues of election campaigns. The fact is that young Canadians tend to be committed to their own structured democracy which differs from that of the parent generations. "The differences can mainly be seen in the ways that today's youth engage in politics, which is primarily through non-electoral activities." Conceptual links between young Canadian values and Canadian newspapers are not contributed to social cohesion, depending on the degree of difference that separates groups in their fundamental values by perceiving Hackett's The News Media and Civic Equality: Watch Dogs, Mad Dogs, or Lap Dogs? In so doing, the media are reinforcing the political status quo by constraining oppositional mobilization, an impact consistent with the lap dog view.

== What's next? ==
Andrew Powell states "newspapers need to establish multi-platform strategies to engage readers that focus on the content rather than the format" on Canadian Community Newspapers Association. He continues, "Perhaps one of the most interesting aspects of the study results was that loyal newspaper readers were more engaged members of their community than non-readers, but at the same time, editorial content in newspapers was seen as irrelevant to youth interests. When editorials did discuss youth, it was also seen as generally negative." According to the Canadian Ethnic Studies Journal written by Karim H. Karim, "younger Canada remains more committed to diversity and civil liberties than the older one." Studies show that current young adult voters turned out to be a political participation because the moral standards are different from parents' generation. "Today's tuned-out young voters are likely to be tomorrow's tuned-out middle-aged voters. And while it is by no means exclusively a Canadian political phenomenon, the decline in electoral participation by young adults is more steel in Canada than in other advanced democracies." Can newspapers be independent from dominant values that Robert A. Hackett argues to influence young audiences? The more one does this, the harder it is to be a political mascot, for one cannot take note of the world's complexity without undermining one's faith in facile ideological solutions. As Orwell knew, the search for context is a step toward mental independence. The cultivation of newspapers has less chance to influence young voters because citizens are already aware of the directions of newspaper contents. Indeed, the contents of newspapers hardly influence the insights of young Canadians because they contribute to contradicted social values and differentiate the political agenda settings. Marc Mayrand, Canada's chief electoral officer says "As a civil society, we need to come together and determine concrete action that could be taken in a co-ordinated matter to seek to engage and re-engage youth in their democracy," he said. Addressing issues of convenience alone will not do it, he said. And he continues, "What is it that makes Canadians interested in politics?" Mr. Mayrand asked. "What is it that turns them off from time to time? And what is it that we can do about changing the culture around this?"

== See also ==
- Apathy is Boring
