= Apathy is Boring =

- Formation: Montreal, Quebec (2004)
- Type: Nonprofit
- Headquarters: Montreal, Quebec
- Key people: Ilona Dougherty, Mackenzie Duncan, Paul Shore
- Website: Apathy is Boring

Apathy is Boring (A is B) is a Canadian, non-partisan, youth-led charitable organization that supports and educates youth to be active and contributing citizens in Canada's democracy.

== History ==
A is B began in January 2004 when founders, Ilona Dougherty, Paul Shore, and Mackenzie Duncan saw that many of their peers felt disengaged from the political process. This was especially evident following the 2000 general election in which the youth voter turnout reached an all-time low of 25%.

When the 2004 Federal Election was called, work began on what would be A is B's first federal "Get out the Youth Vote" campaign. Using a website, digital media technology, concerts, and a media outreach campaign, A is B was able to reach over 500,000 young people in Canada in less than four months. Throughout that campaign A is B was repeatedly featured in the national media, including Canada AM, Mike Duffy Live, The National, CBC Radio – The House, Global TV, MuchMusic and newspapers across Canada.

Following this successful campaign, the founders of A is B began to build their vision into an organization. A is B was able to gain more media attention and develop a solid local youth following through local events such as "The Civic Duty Concerts" in Montreal which featured artists such as Euphrates, Eternia, K'naan, Tumi and the Volume, Taima and Chris Brown and Kate Fenner.

In 2005, A is B launched www.youthfriendly.com in partnership with the Department of Canadian Heritage to offer youth friendly workshops for "adult" organizations who want to better engage youth in their work. A Is B has continued with its mission by organizing concerts and events, creating a clothing line, making public service announcements that were shown in theatres, and in 2008, Her Excellency, the Right Honourable Michaëlle Jean, Governor General of Canada, became A is B's organizational patron.

In 2008, A is B completed its concert series "Every Party Should Be Democratic" in conjunction with its third federal election outreach campaign. In addition to two Youth Dialogues with the governor general of Canada, A is B co-produced a series of four concerts, featuring well-known Canadian artists Hedley, ill Scarlett, Theo Tams, K'naan, and Jully Black, among others. These events exemplified A is B's innovative format of bringing together political and community leaders, artists and over 10 000 youth to talk about the issues that mattered to them and inspired them to get active in their communities. A is B also produced a PSA that aired on MuchMusic Television, advertised in free weeklies in every major Canadian city, and undertook an online campaign "Democracy is More than Voting", urging youth to make an informed decision in the fall 2008 federal election.

The 2011 Federal Election was the first Canadian federal election with wide-scale use of social media. A is B used online tools such as Facebook and Twitter to reach out to a large portion of young Canadians.

Less than a week into the 2011 Federal Election, thousands of youth had pledged to vote through A is B's "I Will Vote" event on Facebook. A is B's young staff and volunteers were able to provide these youth and many more with the resources they needed to cast an informed vote on May 2, 2011. To make information more accessible to youth, profiles of all the Canadian political parties, a public service announcement as well as documents on how to vote and where to vote were provided on the website.

Voter turnout increased slightly for the 2011 federal election, but many young Canadians have yet to be engaged in the electoral process. Having reached a record number of youth with its 2011 election campaign, A is B continues to work towards engaging more young Canadians in the democratic process.

A is B is an important voice on youth issues in Canada: in the process of working towards initiating a dialogue between Canadian youth and elected officials, they testified in front of the House of Commons Standing Committee on Procedures and House Affairs in fall 2007 about changes to the Elections Act. A is B has grown to have a full-time staff, with several interns each year, an active board of directors, a substantial number of young supporters, and many active volunteers. In addition, they have developed an online presence on external networking sites that attracts several new as well as active A is B supporters.

== Members ==
| Name | Experience |
|---|---|
| Jean-Pierre Kingsley (Founding Chair) | Chief electoral officer of Canada (1990–2007) |
| The Honourable Lloyd Axworthy | President and vice-chancellor, University of Winnipeg |
| Dr. André Blais | Director, Canada Research Chair in Electoral Studies, Université de Montréal |
| The Right Honourable Kim Campbell | First female prime minister of Canada (1993) |
| Piya Chattopadhyay | Journalist, CBC Radio and TVO |
| Dr. Penny Collenette | Adjunct professor, University of Ottawa Faculty of Law |
| Phil Fontaine | President, Ishkonigan Inc. National Chief of the Assembly of First Nations (1997–2000, 2003–2009) |
| Roger Gibbins | President and CEO, Canada West Foundation (1998–2012) |
| Dr. Elisabeth Gidengil | Director, Centre for the Study of Democratic Citizenship, McGill University |
| Frank Graves | President, EKOS Research Associates |
| Dr. Richard Johnston | Canada Research Chair in Public Opinion, Elections, and Representation, University of British Columbia |
| Tasha Kheiriddin | Writer, Broadcaster, and Political Commentator |
| The Right Honourable Paul Martin | Prime Minister of Canada (2003–2006) |
| Anne McGarth | Managing Director, ENsight Canada |
| The Honourable Audrey McLaughlin | Leader of the New Democratic Party of Canada (1989–1995) |
| Peter G. White | Former Principal Secretary to Prime Minister Brian Mulroney and lifelong political activist |

== See also ==
- Young voter turnout in Canada
