= YPG International =

Syrian Democratic Forces military unit

- YPG Tabûra Enternasyonel (ku)
- Flag of YPG International.
- Dates active: 19 December 2016 — 25 August 2026
- Dissolved: 25 August 2026
- Active regions: Autonomous Administration of North and East Syria
- Ideology: Anti-fascism; Democratic confederalism
- Part of: Syrian Democratic Forces; People's Protection Units
- Wars: Syrian Civil War and Kurdish–Turkish conflict (Rojava conflict)
- Website: ypgrojava.org/english

The YPG International or People's Protection Units International (Kurdish: YPG Enternasyonel) was a military unit made up of foreign fighters in the Syrian Democratic Forces. It was created in December 2016 as the Antifascist International Tabûr (AIT) of the People's Protection Units (YPG). The unit was part of the Syrian Democratic Forces in the Syrian Civil War.

== Establishment and campaigns ==
2014 VOA report about an American veteran that joined YPG

The brigade was founded in December 2016, with its first commander being the Italian-Moroccan, Karim Franceschi, known by his nom de guerre, Marcello. Initially, the unit operated as a semi-autonomous platoon under brigade commander Heval Taufik, who appointed Karim Franceschi as its leader. Franceschi, the only Kurdish speaker among the founding members, was by far the most experienced. His persistent lobbying with the YPG command, bolstered by his reputation as a competent warrior who had participated in the Siege of Kobanê, was instrumental in the creation of the International Battalion. Unlike the International Freedom Battalion, where Turkish is the predominant language and the leadership is exclusively Turkish, this unit was English-speaking and led by Westerners. Franceschi’s experience and fluency in multiple languages made him a key figure in organizing Western volunteers from across Europe and the U.S., many of whom were anarchists, socialists, and communists joining the anti-ISIS effort in Syria.

Franceschi’s involvement and later experiences in the Rojava revolution were later documented in his book, Non morirò stanotte: Il racconto del comandante italiano che ha liberato Kobane dall’Isis, where he reflects on his role in the battle for Kobanê and the fight against ISIS.

The unit was primarily composed of individuals from Western Europe and the United States, including communists, socialists, and anarchists. In its initial statement, the unit outlined its principles and causes, emphasizing the unity between communists and anarchists in forming an anti-fascist front against the Islamic State of Iraq and the Levant. The statement was released in several languages, including English, Italian, Spanish, and Basque.

The unit participated in several key campaigns, including the 2016 Manbij offensive, the Raqqa campaign (2016-2017), the Deir ez-Zor campaign (2017-19), as well as resisting the 2018 Turkish invasion of Afrin and the 2019 Turkish offensive into northeastern Syria.

== See also ==
- International Freedom Battalion
- International Brigades
- Foreign fighters in the Syrian and Iraqi Civil Wars
- Rojava conflict
