= Taha Derbal =

Algerian politician

- طه دربال
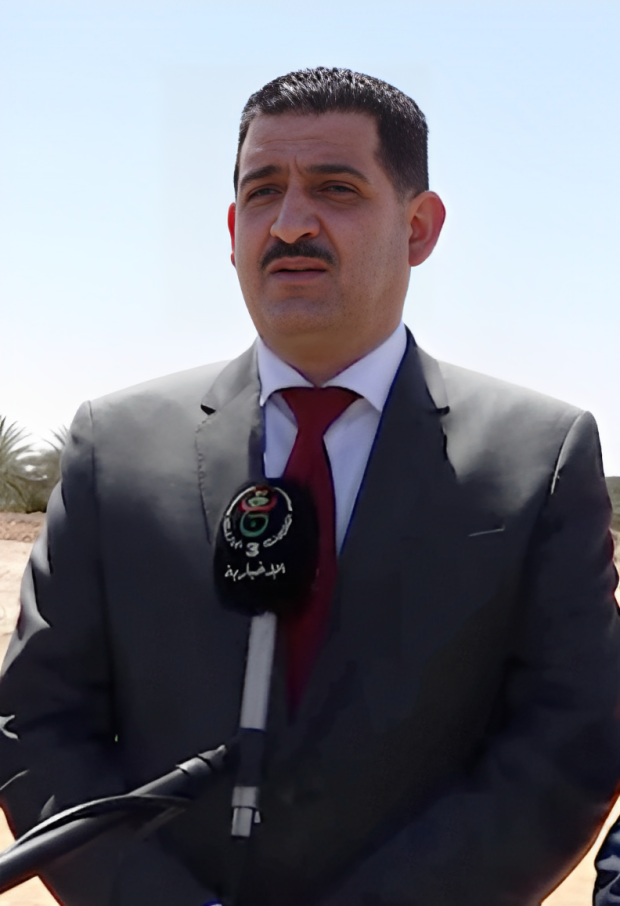
- Derbal in 2023

Minister of Irrigation
- Incumbent
- Assumed office 16 March 2023
- President: Abdelmadjid Tebboune
- Prime Minister: Aymen Benabderrahmane; Nadir Larbaoui
- Preceded by: Karim Hasni

Personal details
- Born: November 13, 1958 (age 67)

Taha Derbal (born 13 November 1958) is the Algerian Minister of Irrigation. He was appointed as minister on 16 March 2023.

== Career ==
Derbal was the Director General of the National Office of Water and Drainage. In 2021, he was appointed Acting General Director of the Algerian Water Company.

In 2022, he became Secretary General of the Ministry of Water Resources.

Since 16 March 2023, Derbal has been Minister of Hydraulics.
