= Irfan (disambiguation) =

Irfan is a concept in Islamic mysticism. Irfan can also refer to:

- Al Irfan (magazine), literary magazine in Beirut, Lebanon
- Irfan (band), a Bulgarian ethereal world music band
- Irfan (name), includes variant Erfan
- IrfanView, computer graphic software
