= Voter turnout in Canada =

Voter turnout is the percentage of registered voters who cast a ballot in an election. The following presents voter turnout figures for Canada's general elections as compiled by Elections Canada.

It is important to differentiate between the percentage of eligible voters and the percentage of voters relative to the entire population (see chart below). For example, in 1867, 73.1% of eligible voters voted, which represented only 8.3% of the total population. When women got the vote in 1918, 67.7% of eligible voters voted, which represented 35.8% of the total population, a huge jump from previous elections.

- The average eligible voter turnout for Canada's general elections since 1867 has been 70.5%
- The highest voter turnouts were in 1958, 1962, and 1963, when eligible voter turnout was 79% and over, roughly 45% the total population.
- The lowest voter turnout on record was in 2008, when eligible voter turnout fell to only 58.8% (44.1% of the total population).
- Eligible voter turnout in the 2011 federal election, at 61.1%, was the third lowest in Canadian history, but at 44.3% of the total population, the 12th lowest since women got the vote in 1918). In comparison, the 1968 election got 75.7% of eligible voters, representing only 41.1% of the total population.
- Voter turnout rose sharply in the 2015 federal election to 68.3% of eligible voters, the highest turnout since 1993.
- Voter turnout decreased to 67% in 2019 and to 62.2% in 2021. (In terms of total population it dropped 4.3% from 48.8% in 2019 to 44.5% in 2021).

When low turnout reflects disenchantment or indifference, the election may not be an accurate reflection of the will of the people. Low turnouts can lead to unequal representation among various parts of the population. In developed countries, non-voters tend to be concentrated in particular demographic and socioeconomic groups, especially the young and the poor.

== The relationship between voting behaviour and voting turnout ==
Voter turnouts and voting behaviour are two fundamental elements of elections in order to have a fully functioning democracy. The voting behaviour of electorates has a large impact on the voter turnout and certain areas of behaviour can cause a low turnout in votes. The voter turnout for recent (post 2019) elections have declined and there is debate as to why this has happened. Examples of short term influences of voting behaviour on voter turnout in Canada are as follows:

- Voters' perceptions of the state of the national economy and who will be the best person for improving the economy. This could also link to the appeal of the politician's policies and how effective they will be.
- Voters' personal economic situations.
- Gender, male voters were more likely than female voters to cast ballots for female candidates
- Age.
- Race and ethnicity.
- Education levels of voters.

== Voter turnout in Canada's general elections ==
Voter turnout in Canada 1867–2025
Date of election	Population (Note: Population is based on Statistics Canada census data available to Elections Canada at the time of publishing the election report.)	Number of electors on list	Total ballots cast	Voter turnout as percentage of electors (Note: Prior to 1966, some electoral districts were dual-member constituencies. As such, the number of ballots cast would be higher than the number of electors who cast ballots. Elections Canada has adjusted the voter turnout percentage downwards to correct for this.)	Voter turnout as percentage of total population
1867-08-07	3,230,000	361,028	268,387	73.1%	8.3%
1872-07-20	3,689,000	426,974	318,329	70.3%	8.6%
1874-01-22	3,689,000	432,410	324,006	69.6%	8.8%
1878-09-17	3,689,000	715,279	534,029	69.1%	14.5%
1882-06-20	4,325,000	663,873	508,496	70.3%	11.8%
1887-02-22	4,325,000	948,222	724,517	70.1%	16.8%
1891-03-05	4,833,000	1,113,140	778,495	64.4%	16.1%
1896-06-23	4,833,000	1,358,328	912,992	62.9%	18.9%
1900-11-07	4,833,000	1,167,402	958,497	77.4%	19.8%
1904-11-03	5,371,000	1,385,440	1,036,878	71.6%	19.3%
1908-10-26	5,371,000	1,463,591	1,180,820	70.3%	22.0%
1911-09-21	7,204,527	1,820,742	1,314,953	70.2%	18.3%
1917-12-17	7,591,971	2,093,799	1,892,741	75.0%	24.9%
1921-12-06	8,760,211	4,435,310	3,139,306	67.7%	35.8%
1925-10-29	8,776,352	4,608,636	3,168,412	66.4%	36.1%
1926-09-14	8,887,952	4,665,381	3,273,062	67.7%	36.8%
1930-07-28	8,887,952	5,153,971	3,922,481	73.5%	44.1%
1935-10-14	10,367,063	5,918,207	4,452,675	74.2%	43.0%
1940-03-26	10,429,169	6,588,888	4,672,531	69.9%	44.8%
1945-06-11	11,494,627	6,952,445	5,305,193	75.3%	46.2%
1949-06-27	11,823,649	7,893,629	5,903,572	73.8%	49.9%
1953-08-10	14,003,704	8,401,691	5,701,963	67.5%	40.7%
1957-06-10	16,073,970	8,902,125	6,680,690	74.1%	41.6%
1958-03-31	16,073,970	9,131,200	7,357,139	79.4%	45.8%
1962-06-18	18,238,247	9,700,325	7,772,656	79.0%	42.6%
1963-04-08	18,238,247	9,910,757	7,958,636	79.2%	43.6%
1965-11-08	18,238,247	10,274,904	7,796,728	74.8%	42.7%
1968-06-25	20,014,880	10,860,888	8,217,916	75.7%	41.1%
1972-10-30	21,568,311	13,000,778	9,974,661	76.7%	46.2%
1974-07-08	21,568,311	13,620,353	9,671,002	71.0%	44.8%
1979-05-22	22,992,604	15,233,653	11,541,000	75.7%	50.2%
1980-02-18	22,992,604	15,890,416	11,015,514	69.3%	47.9%
1984-09-04	24,343,181	16,774,941	12,638,424	75.3%	51.9%
1988-11-21	25,309,331	17,639,001	13,281,191	75.3%	52.5%
1993-10-25	27,296,859	19,906,796	13,863,135	69.6%	50.8%
1997-06-02	27,296,859	19,663,478	13,174,698	67.0%	48.3%
2000-11-27	28,846,761	21,243,473	12,997,185	61.3%	45.1%
2004-06-28	30,007,094	22,466,621	13,683,570	60.9%	45.6%
2006-01-23	30,007,094	23,054,615	14,908,703	64.7%	49.7%
2008-10-14	31,612,897	23,677,639	13,929,093	58.8%	44.1%
2011-05-02	33,476,688	24,257,592	14,823,408	61.1%	44.3%
2015-10-19	33,476,688	25,939,742	17,711,983	68.3%	52.9%
2019-10-21	35,151,728	27,373,058	18,350,359	67.0%	52.2%
2021-09-20	35,151,728	27,366,297	17,034,328	62.2%	48.5%
2025-04-28	36,991,981	28,525,638	19,813,211	69.5%	53.6%

== Voter turnout by Canadian province and territory ==
2021 voter turnout by province and territory
Province or territory	Estimated eligible electors	Total ballots cast	Voter turnout as a percentage of electors
Canada	27,647,165	17,209,811	62.2%
Alberta	3,105,567	1,954,910	62.9%
British Columbia	3,723,767	2,279,961	61.2%
Manitoba	937,906	577,577	61.6%
New Brunswick	615,254	400,901	65.2%
Newfoundland and Labrador	420,919	220,631	52.4%
Nova Scotia	762,238	492,740	64.6%
Northwest Territories	32,394	14,250	44.0%
Nunavut	24,740	7,267	29.4%
Ontario	10,603,270	6,505,569	61.4%
Prince Edward Island	117,205	85,277	72.8%
Quebec	6,458,182	4,132,267	64.0%
Saskatchewan	814,524	518,913	63.7%
Yukon	31,198	19,548	62.7%

== See also ==
- Canadian electoral system
- Elections in Canada
- Fair Vote Canada
- List of Canadian federal general elections
- Young voter turnout in Canada
