= Kareem El-Badry =

American astrophysicist

Kareem El-Badry (born 1994) is an American astronomer and astrophysicist. He is an associate professor of astronomy at the California Institute of Technology.

== Biography ==
El-Badry was born in Roseburg, Oregon. He attended Yale University as an undergraduate and received a PhD in astrophysics from UC Berkeley. He conducted postdoctoral research at Harvard University before moving to Caltech in 2023.

== Research ==
El-Badry's research is focused on black holes and binary stars. In 2021, he and collaborators compiled a catalogue of approximately 1.3 million wide binary systems using data from the Gaia space observatory.

He discovered Gaia BH1, the nearest known black hole to the Earth. He also discovered the fastest-moving star known in the Milky Way, a white dwarf thought to have been ejected from a binary system when its companion exploded. In 2024, he led a team that identified 21 candidate neutron stars in wide orbits around Sun-like stars, using Gaia observations and follow-up measurements from ground-based telescopes.

== Awards and recognition ==
El-Badry was awarded a Sloan Research Fellowship and a MacArthur Fellowship in 2025. In 2026, he received a Packard Fellowship for Science and Engineering from the David and Lucile Packard Foundation.
