= Karim Nayernia =

Prof. Dr. Karim Nayernia (Persian: پرفسور دکتر کریم نیرنیا) is an Iranian biomedical scientist specialising in stem cell biology and personalized medicine.

== Academic career ==
Professor Nayernia is an alumnus of the University of Göttingen, where he completed his studies and later earned his habilitation in Molecular Human Genetics in 2003 at the Georg-August University Medical Faculty. He worked at the university of Göttingen until 2006, when he joined Newcastle University as a Professor of Stem Cell Biology at theInstitute of Human Genetics.

In 2006, Nayernia and his research team used sperm derived from embryonic stem cells to fertilize mice, resulting in seven offspring; one died shortly after birth and the remaining six exhibited health abnormalities. In 2009, Nayernia and his team reported the creation of human sperm-like cells from male stem cells in the laboratory for the first time.
