= Karim Masroor =

Iranian footballer (born 1955)

Personal information
- Full name: Karim Masroor
- Date of birth: 1955 (age 70–71)
- Place of birth: Mashhad, Iran
- Position: Centre forward

Youth career
- 1969–1972: Pas Mashhad

Senior career*
Years	Team	Apps	(Gls)
1972–1973	Pas Mashhad		
1973–1985	F.C. Aboumoslem		

International career
1973–1974	Iran national under-20 football team		
- * Club domestic league appearances and goals

Karim Masroor (Persian: کریم مسرور born in 1955, Mashhad) is a retired Iranian football player. He was known as (Persian: سر طلایی Golden Head) due to his many goals scored through headers.

== Playing career ==
=== Club career ===
He played for Pas Mashhad and F.C. Aboumoslem. His most memorable games were a friendly vs Neftianik Baku and a game versus Persepolis F.C. where he was enjoying himself dribbling past Ali Parvin throughout the game and he scored a goal in that game. His striking partner upfront for F.C. Aboumoslem was Majid Tafreshi. His other team mates were Reza Abbasi, Mohammad Panjali, Akbar Misaghian and Mohammad Azam.

=== National career ===
He was a member of Iran national under-20 football team in 1973–1974. His team mates were Hafez Tahouni, Hassan Rowshan, Nouri Khodayari, Parviz Mazloomi, Mahmoud Haghighian, Gholam Hossein Peyrovani, Hadi Naraghi to name a few.

== Achievements ==
- In one of the Takht Jamshid Cup league seasons during the 1970s, he scored 11 goals.
