= Karim Hasni =

Algerian politician

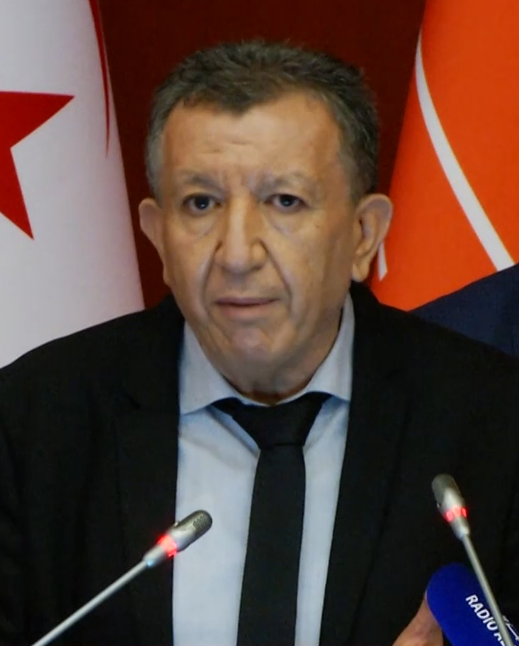
- Hasni in 2021

Minister of Water Resources and Security
- In office 8 July 2021 – 16 March 2023
- President: Abdelmadjid Tebboune
- Prime Minister: Aymen Benabderrahmane
- Preceded by: Mustapha-Kamel Mihoubi
- Succeeded by: Taha Derbal

Karim Hasni is an Algerian politician. Previously he had served as Minister of Water Resources and Security from 8 July 2021 until 16 March 2023.
