= Laila Takla =

Laila Takla is a Coptic Egyptian politician, author, and promoter of positive Muslim-Christian relations. Together with Saba Pasha Habachy, she founded ILC International Legal Consultants Egypt in 1977 and later founded ITD International Trade and Development Egypt in 1988.

== Interparliamentary Union ==
Takla is the first female president of the Foreign Relations Committee of the Egyptian People's Assembly. She was also the first woman to become chairperson of a session of the Inter-Parliamentary Union which she is a member of. Additionally, she is a member of the UNESCO World Heritage Committee.

== Professional career ==
Takla is also a university professor of Law and Management who taught at Cairo University as well as several other universities.

Takla also operates as an international legal consultant, based in Cairo, Egypt.

== Muslim-Christian relations ==
In Takla's 2010 book, Christian-Islamic Heritage, she calls for greater understanding and compassion between the two faiths. She questions the historical grounding of the view of some clerics that Christians are not permitted to build their churches and worship in their own way stating that the Islamic Prophet Muhammad allowed a delegation of Najran Christians to pray in His mosque at Medina in the Christian way.

Takla says "Whether you are Christian or Muslim, allow no place in your heart, mind, and conduct for fanaticism, hate, and exclusion."
