= Karim Troussi =

Karim Troussi is a French-Moroccan theater director and playwright.

== Biography and career ==
Troussi is from Meknes. In 1983, joined the dance and theatre clubs at his high school. He then joined the French-Moroccan theater company of the French Cultural Center with which he performed several plays. He travelled to Avignon in 1987 to play 'Poivre de Cayenne' by Rene de Obaldia.

Soon after, Troussi moved to Paris where he enrolled at the Ecole de la rue Blanche. Lacking financial means, he took advantage of a number of free courses offered by certain private schools. He ended up joining an acting school set up by Niels Arestrup in Paris, where he worked with Arestrup, Maurice Benichou, Hans Peter Cloos, Pierre Pradinas and François Cluzet. He was then admitted to the Conservatoire National Supérieur d'Art Dramatique de Paris where he took classes with Daniel Mesguich and many other notable artists before he finally turned to directing by training with Jack Garfein.

He has been particularly involved in the artistic development of musical groups (such as "Babylon Circus", "Hurlement de Leo", "Melk", "Fanfarnaüm"...) and the staging of concerts. He has initiated and directed several artistic projects worldwide. As a theater director, he has more than twenty productions to his credit.

== Plays ==
- Oedipiades
- La Civilisation, ma mère!
- Mazroube!
- L’Honneur de la guerre
- Le Maître d'œuvre

== Bibliography ==
- Mazroube ! : pièce de théâtre et dossier pédagogique (اريد ان اكون فراشة)
