= Karim Darwish (politician) =

Egyptian member of parliament

Karim Abdel Karim Darwish
- Born: June 1, 1965 (age 60); Alexandria
- Occupations: politician, lawyer
- Known for: Chairman of the Foreign Relations Committee in the Egyptian parliament, Executive Partner at Internationale Legal Consultants

Karim Abdel Karim Darwish (Arabic: كريم درويش; born 1965) is an Egyptian politician and lawyer. He is a member of the Egyptian House of Representatives and the Managing Partner of ILC Egypt.

== Educational Background ==
Karim Darwish graduated from the German school in Dokki, Egypt in 1983. He holds a Bachelor of Economics and a Bachelor of Laws (LLB) from Cairo University. Karim also holds a Master of Economics from the School of Oriental and African Studies in London, United Kingdom. He speaks four languages: Arabic, German, English and French.

== Career ==
Karim worked in the Egyptian Foreign Ministry as a diplomat in the department of international organizations from 1988 to 1992. During 1992 to 2009 he shifted careers and worked in the banking sector where he became regional manager of the Middle East for a number of international and European banks. In 2016, Karim was nominated by President Abdel Fattah Al-Sisi to join the Egyptian House of Representatives. He has since been nominated for chairman of the Foreign Relations Committee, president of the Parliamentary Assembly of the Mediterranean, vice-president of the Egypt Support Coalition and assistant secretary-general of the Future of the Nation Party. Outside of his parliamentary responsibilities, Darwish has been involved in various professional activities connected to economic development and international cooperation. In addition to his political career, Darwish is also an early-stage investor in emerging startup projects, including the “Move to Germany” platform, and the Germany-based digital services startup Klevora.

== Family ==
Karim Darwish is married with 3 children. He is the son of Dr. Laila Takla and Dr. Abdel Karim Darwish.
