= Karim al-Din Aqsarayi =

14th-century Persian historian and bureaucrat

Karim al-Din Aqsarayi was a 14th-century Persian historian and bureaucrat. He is principally known for his Musamarat al-akhbar wa-musayarat al-akhyar, a historical chronicle written in Persian, which mainly focused on Anatolia under the rule of the Mongol Ilkhanate.

== Sources ==
- Leiser, Gary (2008). "al-Aqsarāyī, Karīm al-Dīn". In Fleet, Kate; Krämer, Gudrun; Matringe, Denis; Nawas, John; Rowson, Everett (eds.). Encyclopaedia of Islam (3rd ed.). Brill Online. ISSN 1873-9830.
- Shukurov, Rustam (2016). The Byzantine Turks, 1204-1461. Brill. ISBN 978-9004305120.
