= Karim Sadr =

- Born: 1959 (age 66–67); Tehran, Iran
- Education: Southern Methodist University
- Scientific career
- Fields: Archaeological
- Workplaces: University of the Witwatersrand,
- Thesis: "The Development of Nomadism in Northeast Africa"

Karim Sadr is an archaeologist contributing to research in southern Africa. He is the author of over 60 academic articles, a book and two edited volumes. While Sadr has contributed to the Kalahari Debate, his more recent work has focused on historical revision, re-examining the acquisition of domesticated animals and pottery in southern Africa by Hunter-gatherer. His work is reintroducing the term Neolithic back into southern African archaeological discourse from which it had previously been removed.

== Biography ==
Karim Sadr was born in Tehran, Iran, 1959. He began his studies at the Southern Methodist University(SMU)in Dallas, Texas, where he continued to the completion of his doctorate in anthropology. Sadr received his doctorate in 1988 for “The Development of Nomadism in Northeast Africa” under the supervision of Professor Anthony Marks.

Karim Sadr remained at SMU as a research associate until 1990. He would later receive two post-doctoral fellowships: the first from the American Research Centre in Egypt and the second from the University of Cape Town (UCT). In 1992 he took the position of Director for Archaeology at Centro Ricerche sul Deserto Orientale (CeRDO). After leaving CeRDO in 1995, he took up a lectureship in the history department of the University of Botswana (UB): Gaborone.

Beginning in 2001, he has established himself at the University of the Witwatersrand, where he is currently a Senior Lecturer and associate professor in the school of Geography, Archeology and Environmental Studies Sciences (GAES). He currently holds the position of Head of School.

== Re-introducing the Neolithic to Southern Africa ==
The term Neolithic has been used in a variety of ways with varying definitions and originates in description of European archaeology. The Neolithic refers to a period which is distinguished by the use of stone tools with food-producing practices but has also been associated with pottery.

The orthodox view in southern African archaeology is largely that food-producing pastoralists—conventionally known as the Khoekhoe—introduced domesticated animals, pottery and metal tools to the region. This view originates in 1929, when A.J.H. Goodwin and Clarence van Riet Lowe—then the director of the South African Bureau of Archaeology– decided that the divisions applied to European technological developments were not appropriate to the study of southern Africa. They argued for the removal of the term 'Neolithic' from the common vocabulary of the discipline, and suggested that the Iron Age had come about as a result of imported technologies. The apparent result of this long-lasting viewpoint is the simultaneous introduction of domesticates, pottery and metal tools as part of an Iron Age migration of pastoralists into southern Africa. The result of this idea is that no room is left for a 'Neolithic' era, defined—in part—by stone tools. Instances of pottery and domesticated animals have become synonymous with the Iron Age, and as such, have steadily come be seen as evidence of the Khoekhoe.

Conversely, Karim Sadr and Garth Sampson have argued that there were two distinct pottery techniques in southern Africa: thick walled pottery, and a distinct, thin walled variant, which are associated with specific contexts. The thin walled pottery has become associated with southern African Late Stone Age sites and early northern Khoehkoe pottery in Angola; whereas the thick walled examples were uniformly associated with later pastoralists. The method of production in the thin-walled examples used fibre temper, resulting in lighter and more easily transportable pottery in southern Africa34, while mineral-base pottery is heavier and associated with thick walled ware. Sadr and Sampson argue that this is either evidence of diffusion of technological ideas without migrant influx or of hunter-gatherers independently inventing pottery before the arrival of food producers. Dating has shown that the influx of pottery in 600–1000 CE occurs substantially after the first thin walled pottery had been produced around the southern reaches of Africa, at approximately 300 CE37.

In the 1960s, examples of hunters-gatherer sites with domesticated animal (sheep) remains were discovered, and were suggested by Richard Elphick to have been indicative of hunter-gathers either stealing from or trading with nearby Khoekhoe herders. Sadr has argued that to suppose that the Khoekhoe were the source of domesticated animals is no longer acceptable. In the subsequent three decades, no evidence has been found suggesting that this was the case while sites in the Seacow river valley and Kasteelberg have instead provided evidence of "hunters-with-sheep".

In arguing that hunter-gatherers in southern Africa where from a period of "hunters-with-sheep", during which pottery was independently invented, Karim Sadr has challenged the primacy of Iron Age pastoralism in southern African archaeology and opened a case for the acceptance of the Neolithic. Despite this, Sadr does suggest that there is room for his view to co-exist with a more orthodox one.

== Criticisms ==
Andrew Smith has commented that Sadr has been "seduced by the assumption that all people are just waiting to become food producers". Smith also argues that Sadr's work on "hunters-with-sheep" implies that becoming a shepherd without a pastoral role model would be easy for a hunter to accomplish when, as Smith claims; learning animal husbandry would instead require contact with pastoralism. Sadr has not at this point formally responded to these criticisms.

== Selected publications ==
=== Books ===
1. Sadr, K. 1991. The Development of Nomadism in Ancient Northeast Africa. Philadelphia: University of Pennsylvania Press.

=== Published dissertations ===
1. Sadr, K. 1988. The Development of Nomadism: the View from Ancient Northeast Africa. Ann Arbor: University Microfilms International.

=== Edited volumes ===
1. Sadr, K. & Fauvelle-Aymar, F-X. (eds). 2008. Khoekhoe and the first herders in southern Africa. Southern African Humanities volume 20, number 1

2. Sadr, K. (ed). 2001. Essays on Botswana Archaeology. Pula: Botswana Journal of African Studies, volume 15, number 1.

=== Chapters in books ===
1. Sadr, K., Gribble, J. & Euston-Brown, G. 2013. Archaeological survey on the Vredenburg Peninsula. In: Jerardino, A., Braun, D. & Malan, A. (eds) The Archaeology of the West Coast of South Africa, pp. 50–67. Cambridge Monographs in African Archaeology 84. BAR International Series 2526. Oxford: Archaeopress.

2. Sadr, K. 2013. The archaeology of herding in southernmost Africa. In: Mitchell, P. & Lane, P. (eds) Oxford Handbook of African Archaeology, pp. 645–655. Oxford: Oxford University Press.

3. Sadr, K. 2013. A short history of early herding in southern Africa. In: Bollig, M., Schnegg, M. & Wotzka, H-P. (eds) Pastoralism in Africa: Past, Present and Futures, pp. 171–197. New York & Oxford: Berghahn Books.

4. Sadr, K. 2005. Hunter-gatherers and herders of the Kalahari during the late Holocene. In: Peter Veth, Mike Smith & Peter Hiscock (eds), Desert Peoples: Archaeological Perspectives, pp. 206–221. Malden, MA: Blackwell Publishing.

5. Sadr, K. 2002. Encapsulated Bushmen in the Archaeology of Thamaga. In S. Kent (ed) Ethnicity, hunter-gatherers, and the “other”: association or assimilation in Africa, pp. 28–47. Washington and London: Smithsonian Institution Press.

6. Sadr, K., Gribble, J. & Euston-Brown, G. 1992. The Vredenburg Peninsula Survey, 1991/1992 season. In: A.B. Smith and B. Mutti (eds) Guide to the Archaeological Sites in the Southwestern Cape, pp. 41–43. Cape Town: University of Cape Town.

7. Smith, A.B., Sadr, K., Gribble, J. & Yates, R. 1992. Witklip and Posberg Reserve. In: A.B. Smith and B. Mutti (eds) Guide to the Archaeological Sites of the Southwestern Cape.

=== Articles in refereed journals ===
1. Sadr, K. 2012. The Origins and Spread of Dry Laid, Stone-Walled Architecture in Pre-Colonial Southern Africa. Journal of Southern African Studies 38(2): 257–263.

2. Sadr, K. & Rodier, X. 2012. Google Earth, GIS and stone-walled structures in southern Gauteng, South Africa. Journal of Archaeological Science 39: 1034–1042.

3. Bradfield, J. & Sadr, K. 2011. Stone arrowheads from Holkrans, North West Province, South Africa. South African Archaeological Bulletin 66 (193): 77–88.

4. Sadr, K. & Gribble, J. 2010. The stone artefacts from the Vredenburg Peninsula archaeological survey, west coast of South Africa. Southern African Humanities, 22: 19–88.

5. Couzens, R. & Sadr, K. 2010. Rippled Ware at Blinklipkop, Northern Cape. South African Archaeological Bulletin 65(192): 196–203.

6. Bradfield, J., Holt, S. & Sadr, K. 2009. The last of the LSA on the Makgabeng Plateau, Limpopo Province', South African Archaeological Bulletin 64: 176–183.

7. Sadr, K. 2009. Marine shell dates and surface lithic assemblages on the west coast of South Africa. Journal of Archaeological Science 36: 2713–2729.

8. Sadr, K. 2008. Invisible herders? The archaeology of Khoekhoe pastoralists. Southern African Humanities 20(1): 179–203.

9. Fauvelle-Aymar, F-X. & Sadr, K. 2008. Trends and traps in the reconstruction of early herding societies in southern Africa. Southern African Humanities 20(1): 1–6.

10. Sadr, K. 2008. An ageless view of first millennium AD southern African ceramics. Journal of African Archaeology 6(1): 103–130.

11. Sadr, K. 2007. The UB/UCT excavation at Kasteelberg A, West Coast of South Africa. South African Archaeological Bulletin 62(186): 154–161.

12. Sadr, K. & Sampson, C.G. 2006. Through thick and thin: early pottery in southern Africa. Journal of African Archaeology 4: 235–252.

13. Sadr, K. & Fauvelle-Aymar, F-X. 2006. Ellipsoid grinding hollows on the west coast of South Africa. Southern African Humanities 18(2): 29–50.

14. Fauvelle-Aymar, F-X., Sadr, K., Bon, F. & Gronenborn, D. 2006. The visibility and invisibility of herders’ kraals in South Africa, with reference to a possible early contact period Khoekhoe kraal at KFS 5 (Western Cape). Journal of African Archaeology 4: 253–271.

15. Sadr, K. 2004. Feasting on Kasteelberg? Early herders on the west coast of South Africa. Before Farming 2004/3 article 2: 167–183.

16. Copley M.S., Hansel, F.A., Sadr, K. & Evershed R.P. 2004. Organic residue evidence for the processing of marine animal products in pottery vessels from the pre-colonial archaeological site of Kasteelberg D east, South Africa. South African Journal of Science 100: 279–283.

17. Sadr, K. 2003. The Neolithic of southern Africa. Journal of African History 44: 195–209.

18. Sadr, K., Smith, A., Plug, I., Orton, J. & Mütti, B. 2003. Herders and foragers on Kasteelberg: interim report of excavations 1999–2002. South African Archaeological Bulletin 58: 27–32.

19. Sadr, K. & Plug, I. 2001. Faunal remains in the transition from hunting to herding in southeastern Botswana. South African Archaeological Bulletin 56: 76–82.

20. Sadr, K. & Sampson, C.G. 1999. Khoekhoe ceramics of the upper Seacow River valley. South African Archaeological Bulletin 54: 3–15.

21. Sampson, C.G. & Sadr, K. 1999. On the size and shape of Later Stone Age fibre-tempered vessels from the upper Seacow River valley. Southern African Field Archaeology 8: 3–16.

22. Sadr, K. 1998. The first herders at the Cape of Good Hope. African Archaeological Review 15(2): 101–132.

23. Sadr, K. 1997. Kalahari archaeology and the Bushman debate. Current Anthropology 38: 104–112.

24. Sadr, K. & Smith, A. 1991. On ceramic variation in the southwestern Cape, South Africa. South African Archaeological Bulletin 46: 107–15.

25. Smith, A.B., Sadr, K., Gribble, J. & Yates, R. 1991. Excavations in the south-western Cape, South Africa, and the archaeological identity of prehistoric hunter-gatherers within the last 2000 years. South African Archaeological Bulletin 46: 71–91.

26. Sadr, K. 1988. Settlement Patterns and Land Use in the Late Prehistoric Southern Atbai; East Central Sudan. Journal of Field Archaeology 15: 381–401.
