= Karim Jamal =

Canadian accountant

Dr. Karim Jamal, CA, is Chartered Accountants' Distinguished Chair in Accounting, and a professor at the University of Alberta School of Business.

He has a Fellowship at the Institute for United States Policy Studies. He is a professor of Financial Accounting, Managerial Accounting, Management Control, Accounting Theory and Auditing, as well as a few MBA courses. Dr. Karim is a member of the Institute of Chartered Accountants of Alberta (ICAA), American Accounting Association (AAA), and the Canadian Academic Accounting Association (CAAA). Jamal has a BComm (Hons) from the University of Manitoba, an MSc from the University of British Columbia and a PhD (Business Administration with a concentration in Accounting), from the Carlson School of Management, University of Minnesota in 1991. His thesis was Detecting Framing Effects in Audit Judgment.

His research interest is in developing cognitive models of expert decision making in accounting, auditing and financial markets.
