= Kareem Lopez =

Karim López
- Born: Kareem Ignacio Lopez Contreras. January 1, 1990 (age 35); Lindsay, California, United States
- Origin: Jalcocotan, Nayarit, Mexico
- Genres: Regional Mexican
- Occupation: Singer
- Instrument: Vocals
- Years active: 2000–present
- Labels: ADA Records

Kareem Ignacio López Contreras (born January 1, 1990), better known by his stage name, Karim Lopez, is a Mexican musician and singer who became widely known as a former member of the musical group AK-7.

== Early life ==
Lopez was born in Lindsay, California the second of four children, where he lived with his parents. When he was about 7 years old, his family relocated to Bakersfield, California. Growing up into a family a musicians, Lopez watched at an early age his father and uncles perform. He started playing the drums at age 8, and would eventually start playing percussion at the age of 10 in his father's group. As he got older, he started becoming very interested in singing. His dad eventually started letting him come out of his shyness by letting him sing at times during their performances. At the age of 14, Lopez became the group's official singer. He went on to record four albums under an independent label while with the group.

== Solo career (2011–present) ==
Lopez returned to Nayarit, Mexico to start work on his first solo album. On October 1, 2011 his debut single and album were released, both under the name "Agridulce".

== Discography ==
- Agridulce (2011)

== Awards ==
AK-7

- Lo Nuestro Awards
  - 2009: Breakout Artist or Group of the Year [Won]
