= Karim Séga Diouf =

Senegalese football manager (died 2019)

Personal information
- Date of death: 6 January 2019
- Place of death: Rufisque, Senegal

Managerial career
- Years: Team
- 1990?–1998: AS Douanes
- 1995–1996: Senegal U20
- 2011–2015: Senegal Olympic
- 2012: Senegal (caretaker)
- 2012: Senegal (assistant)
- 2014–2016: AS Douanes
- 2017–2018: ASEC Ndiambour
- Teungueth FC

Karim Séga Diouf (died 6 January 2019) was a Senegalese football manager.

He was educated at CNEPS in Thiès. In addition to Senegalese clubs such as ASEC Ndiambour, ASC Port Autonome, ASC Jaraaf, ASC Jeanne d'Arc, Saltigué (twice), Foyer and AS Douanes, he managed the Senegal Olympic team from 2011 to 2015, clinching qualification to Senegal's only Olympic performance. In early 2012 he became caretaking co-manager of the national team after Amara Traoré was sacked. Diouf then served the rest of the year as national team assistant manager under Joseph Koto, until both were sacked in October 2012.

After winning the Ligue 1 with AS Douanes in 2015, his last club was Teungueth FC. He died in January 2019 in Rufisque.
