= Karim Ouazzane =

British computer scientist

Professor Karim Ouazzane is a computer scientist and Professor of Computing and Knowledge Exchange in the School of Computing within the Faculty of Life Sciences and Computing at London Metropolitan University in London.

== Academic and professional posts ==
- Professor of Computing and Knowledge Exchange, London Metropolitan University
- Senior Research Fellow, Imperial College, University of London
- Team Leader, Research and Development, PowerGen
- Senior Engineer, Schlumberger
- Engineer, Endress-Hauser Ltd

== Academic and professional qualifications ==
- 1994 PhD 'Computational and Experimental investigation of flow through petroleum oil pipes installation packages using AI and CAD technologies', a novel concept on the design of flow sensor was made and patented (N 9319025.4.), Department of Aeronautics, Manufacturing and Mechanical Engineering, Salford University
- 1989 MRes, thesis title 'Computational and Signal Processing Techniques of Flow Around a Slender Body', Department of Aerospace, Control and Mechanical Engineering, Liverpool University
- 1986 Ingenieur D'etat in Marine and Mechanical Engineering: Distinction, University of Oran (Algeria)

== Membership of professional bodies and learned societies ==
- Fellow of British Computer Society (FBCS)
- Senior Member of International Neural Network Society (INNS)
- Fellow of Higher Education Academy (FHEA)
- Member of American Society of Mechanical Engineering (ASME)

== Research and development ==
- Intelligent Keyboard for disabled people (2011)

== Recent publications ==
M. Malcangi, K.Ouazzane, P.Patel (2013) 'Audio visual fuzzy fusion for robust speech recognition' Proceedings of International Joint Conference on Neural Networks, Dallas, Texas, USA, 4–9 August 2013, pp 284.

M. Malcangi, M.Riva, K.Ouazzane (2013) 'Hard and soft computing methods for capturing and processing phonocardiogram' International Journal of Circuits, Systems and Signal Processing, Issue 1, Volume 7, pp 34.

J.Li, K.Ouazzane, H.Kazemian, M.S.Afzal (2013) ' Neural Network Approaches for Noisy Modelling', IEEE Transactions on Neural Networks and Learning system, Volume 24 page 1–12. DOI: 10:1109/TNNLS.2013.2263557

M.Aigbodi, K.Ouazzane, D.Mitchell, V.Vassilev and J.Li (2013) ‘ Defence in-depth for Cyber Security With Custom Anti-Virus Signature Definition' The third conference on digital information processing and communication (ICDIPC2013) ISBN 978-0-9853483-3-5, pp 150.

V.Vassilev, M.Ulman, K.Ouazzane, H.Kazemian, M.Aigbodi and R.Boyd (2013) 'OntoCarer; An ontological framework for assistive agents for the disabled' The third conference on digital information processing and communication (ICDIPC2013) ISBN 978-0-9853483-3-5, pp 406.

K.Ouazzane, M.Aigbodi and J.Li (2013) ‘ Real life pilot solution with artificial intelligence for disabled computer users' The third conference on digital information processing and communication (ICDIPC2013) ISBN 978-0-9853483-3-5, pp 310.

H.kazemian and K.Ouazzane (2012) 'Neuro-fuzzy approach to video transmission over Zigbee; Neurocomputing journal, DOI: 10.1016/j.neucom.2012.10.006

K. Ouazzane, J. Li, H. Kazemian, Y. Jing and R. Boyd (2012) ‘ An artificial intelligence language modelling framework' International Journal of expert systems with applications; DOI: 10.1016/j.eswa.2011.11.121

J. Li, K. Ouazzane, H. Kazemian, Y. Jing, R. Boyd (2011) ‘ A neural Network Based Solution for Automatic Typing Errors Correction', Journal of Neural Computing Applications; DOI: 10.1007/s00521-010-0492-3

K.Ouazzane, Jun Li and H.B. Kazemian (2011) An Intelligent Keyboard Framework for Improving Disabled People Computer Accessibility, 12th Engineering Applications of Neural Networks and 7th Artificial Intelligence Applications and Innovations Joint Conferences, Corfu, Greece, Springer, Part I, International Federation for Information Processing AICT 363, pp. 382–391, 15th – 18 September 2011.

K.Ouazzane, S.Afzal, H.Kazemian and J. Li (2011) 'An E-business framework design using enhanced web 2.0 technology' ICEIS 2011–13th International Conference on Enterprise Information systems; Vol. 2, pp. 97, 2011.

J.Li, K.Ouazzane, S.Afzal and H.Kazemian (2011) 'Patterns identification for hitting adjacent key errors correction using neural network models' ICEIS 2011– 13th International Conference on Enterprise Information systems; Vol. 3 pp. 5, 2011.

K.Ouazzane, J. Li and H. Kazemian (2011) ‘ An Intelligent Keyboard Framework for Improving Disabled People Computer Accessibility' EANN/AIAI 2011, Part 1, IFIP AICT, pp. 382–391.

C. Althaff-Irfan, K. Ouazzane, S. Nomura and F. Yoshimi (2010) ‘ An Access Control System for e-learning System Management System' Proc. 47th the Japan Society of Mechanical Engineers; Hokuriku-etsu, pp. 59.

C. Althaff-Irfan, K. Ouazzane, S. Nomura and F. Yoshimi (2010) 'An access Control for e-learning management systems' IEEJ journal (ID C10 -174).

J. Li, K. Ouazzane, H. Kazemian, Y. Jing and R. Boyd (2009) ‘ Focused Time Delay Neural Network Modelling Towards Typing Stream Prediction' IADIS multiple on computer sciences and Information system, Proceedings of Intelligent Systems and Agents, pp. 189, ISBN 978-972-8924-87-4, Algarve, Portugal.

C. Althaff-Irfan, S. Nomura, K. Ouazzane, Y. Takashi (2009) 'Faced-based Access Control and Invigilation Tool For e-learning systems' International conference on biometrics and Kasei Engineering, pp. 40, IEEE computer society, Cieszyn, Poland.

J. Li, K. Ouazzane, Y. Jing, H. Kazemian and R. Boyd (2009) ‘ Evolutionary Ranking on Multiple Word Correction Algorithms Using Neural Network Approach' The 11th International on Engineering Applications of Neural Networks, EANN 2009, pp. 409 London.

C. Althaff-Irfan, S. Nomura, K. Ouazzane and F. Yoshimi (2009) ‘ Real Time Invigilation and Chronic Authentication Tool for e-learning Management System' International Journal of 3-Dimensional Images, Vol. 23 N2, July 2009.
