= Karim Webb =

American restaurateur

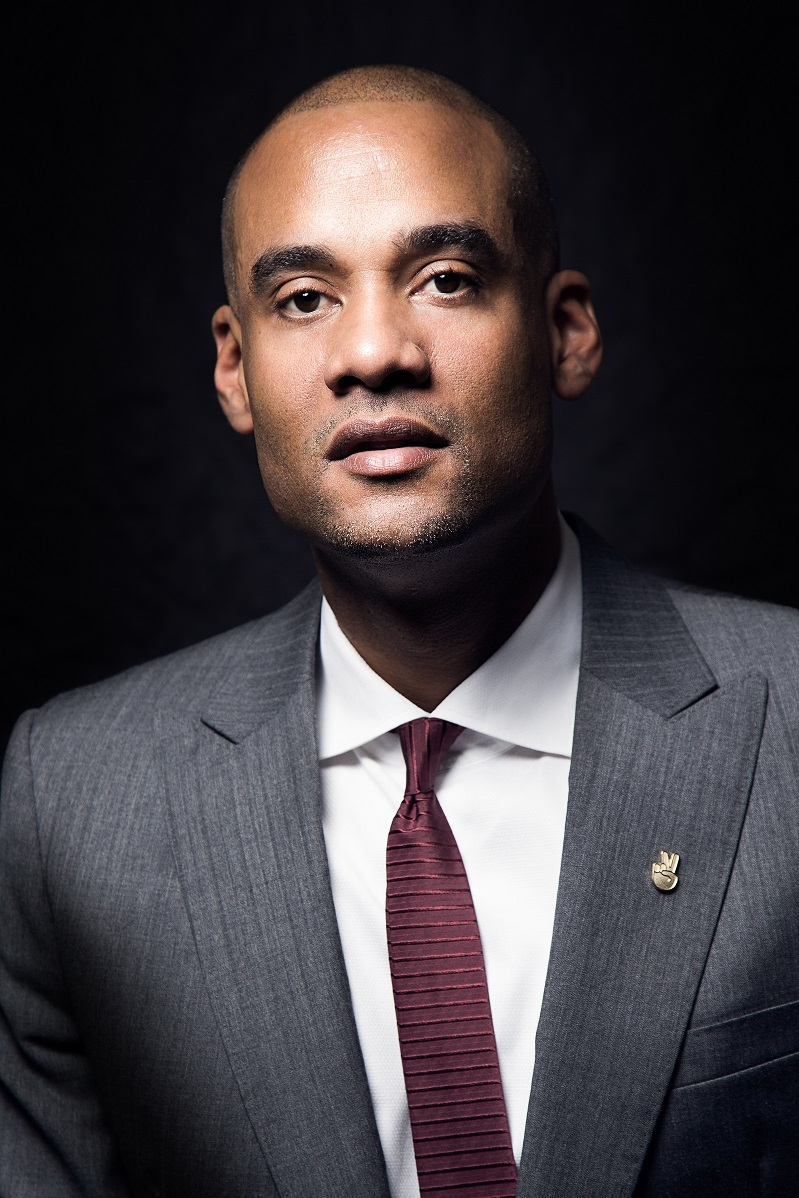
- Born: 1974 (age 51–52)
- Education: Morehouse College
- Occupation: Restaurateur
- Awards: Black Enterprise's 2014 Annual Small Business Award for Franchise Company of the Year
- Website: karimwebb.com

Karim Webb (born 1974) is an American restaurateur based in Los Angeles. He is best known for creating a successful franchise restaurant in South Los Angeles in 2011, the first full-service restaurant in the area since the 1992 Los Angeles riots. His business model includes training in management, business and life skills for workers and youth in the local community.

Webb won Black Enterprise Magazine's 2014 Annual Small Business Award for Franchise Company of the Year.

== Early life ==
Karim grew up in Rowland Heights, California. Webb's father, Reggie Webb, was an executive at McDonald's. When Karim was 11, his father became a McDonald's franchisee in the Inland Empire of Southern California. The family business grew to 16 restaurants, where Karim worked with his two siblings. By the time Karim Webb was 28, he had been working in the restaurant business for 17 years. Webb attended Morehouse College in Atlanta. For a time, he did business in real estate.

Karim is the father of 3. His daughter, Amira "Skye" Webb plays softball for Georgia Tech.

== Career ==
Webb re-entered the restaurant business when he formed PCF Management (PCF stands for "positive cash flow"), along with his childhood friend and financial expert Edward Barnett. He decided to open a Buffalo Wild Wings franchise in California, where the brand was not well known yet. Because of the recession, bank financing was unavailable, but he was able to attract individuals to help invest what would eventually amount to $6 million for two restaurants. The first restaurant opened in Del Amo Fashion Plaza in the Torrance Mall in late 2009. When it proved to be successful, he started looking for another location in Los Angeles.

Webb opened the second restaurant in South Los Angeles, in Baldwin Hills Crenshaw Plaza, which was hard hit by the 1992 Los Angeles riots. In 2011, when he opened the restaurant, the area was known for gang activity.

Webb's Crenshaw Plaza restaurant became the first casual-dining franchise restaurant to open in South Los Angeles in 25 years. It won awards from Buffalo Wild Wings (BWW) corporate headquarters for year-over-year sales increases, and became the approved training store for other BWW locations to train their employees. It also outperformed all other BWWs, for year over year sale increases, in 2014 and 2015.

In 2014, Webb acquired a third restaurant in Carson, California.

== Business model ==
When opening the Crenshaw Plaza restaurant, Webb introduced original elements to adapt his business to the area with a strong gang presence. The hosts at the door, which are well connected to gang culture, check bags as guests enter and turn away people wearing the colors of the Crips and Bloods or gang signs. Patio windows facing the parking lot are blacked out to prevent anyone driving by seeing who is dining inside. When a local gang member hosted an after-wake party at the restaurant, Webb and his security called competing gangs in the neighborhood to tell them not to visit the restaurant that night.

Webb provides opportunities for neighborhood youth in the guise of jobs, training and fresh starts. He hired most of the staff from the Los Angeles Urban League, which helps young minority Angelenos find education and employment.

== Community work ==
Webb takes part in non-profit community programs such as the California Community Foundation's BLOOM (Building a Lifetime of Options and Opportunities for Men) program, which mentors 14-to-18-year-old African American males who are or have been on probation for nonviolent crimes. Webb gives Bloomers jobs, but also mentors those who get jobs with his business. It is a five-year initiative launched in 2012.

In 2014, Webb announced a partnership between his restaurant and Dorsey High School's School of Business and Entrepreneurship (SBE). His 16-week program taught 29 Senior SBE students how to effectively run a restaurant from beginning to end. The final test was a fully functional pop-up restaurant, developed and operated by the students.

== Awards and recognition ==
Webb won Black Enterprise magazine's 2014 Annual Small Business Award for Franchise Company of the Year.

He was voted as the Vice-Chair/Board of Directors for the Greater Los Angeles African American Chamber of Commerce, was presented the Mentor of The Year Award by the Brotherhood Crusade for his work with BLOOM, and became the Chairman of the Los Angeles Southwest College Foundation.
