= Karim Bougherara =

French-Algerian rugby union player

Personal information
- Born: 3 January 1989 (age 36); Vienne, Isère, France
- Height: 6 ft 0 in (1.83 m)
- Weight: 108 kg (17 st 0 lb; 238 lb)

Playing information
- Position: Prop
Club
Years	Team	Pld	T	G	FG	P
2010–11	Bourgoin-Jallieu	5	0	5	0	0
2011–13	Auch Gers	58	0	10	0	0
2013–14	Section Paloise	20	0	0	0	0
2014–15	RC Toulonnais	2	0	0	0	0
2015–	Union Sportive Bressane	27	0	0	0	0
	Total	112	0	15	0	0
Representative
Years	Team	Pld	T	G	FG	P
2015	Algeria	1	0	0	0	0
- Source: As of 2 December 2016

Karim Bougherara is a French-Algerian rugby union player who currently plays for Union Sportive Bressane and is an Algerian international. He plays as a prop.

== Playing career ==
Bougherara started with the Bourgoin-Jallieu during the 2010–11 season where he plays only one match of the Top 14 and four matches of the European Challenge. In order to increase his playing time, he left the Berjallian club at the end of the season to join the Auch Gers evolved in Pro D2. He stayed two seasons until 2013 when he signed a contract with the Section Paloise.
