= Karim El-Khebir =

Nigerien footballer (born 1974)

Personal information
- Date of birth: 4 May 1974 (age 52)
- Place of birth: Niger
- Position: Defender

Senior career*
Years	Team	Apps	(Gls)
1991–1992	Stade Brestois 29		
1994–1996	Valenciennes FC		
1996–1999	LB Châteauroux	37	(1)
1999–2000	ASOA Valence	26	(0)
2003–2004	St Patrick's Athletic	48	(0)
2006–2007	Sainte-Geneviève Sports		
- * Club domestic league appearances and goals

Karim El-Khebir (alternatively spelled Karim El-Khebyr; born 4 May 1974 in Niger) is a Nigerien retired footballer who now works as head coach of NDC Angers first team in his home country.

== Career ==
El-Khebir started his career with Stade Brestois 29 before moving to Valenciennes. In 1999, he signed for ASOA Valence in the French Ligue 2, where he made 26 appearances. After that, he played for Irish club St Patrick's Athletic and French club Sainte-Geneviève Sports before retiring.
