= Karim Brohi =

British surgeon

Professor Karim Brohi FRCS FRCA
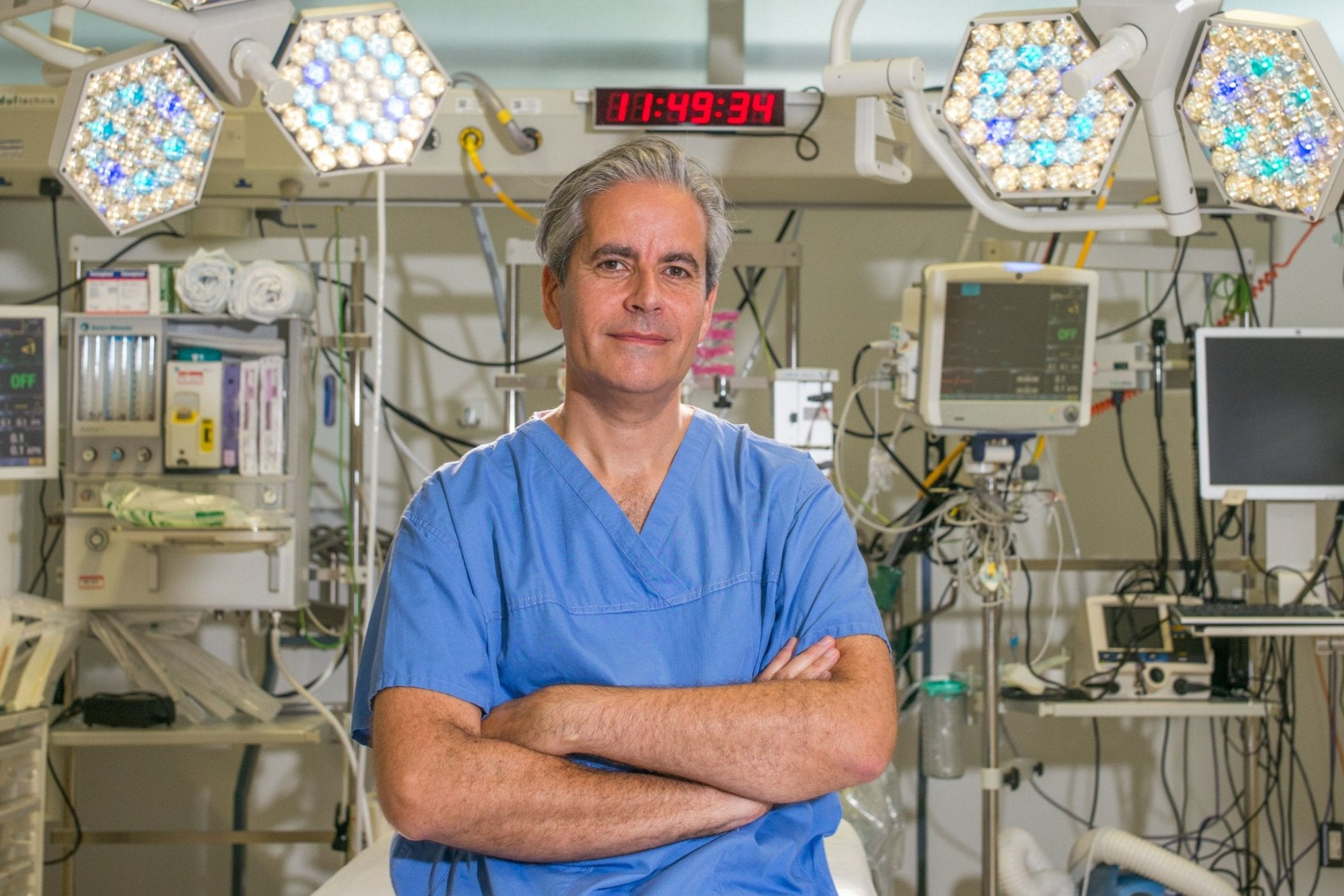
- Born: 28 August 1968 (age 58); London
- Education: University College London
- Known for: Clinical Director of London Major Trauma Network, research into bleeding in trauma patients
- Medical career
- Profession: Surgeon, anesthetist
- Field: Trauma surgery, vascular surgery, Mass casualty incident
- Institutions: Queen Mary University of London, Royal London Hospital

Karim Hassan Brohi FRCS FRCA (born 28 August 1968) is a British surgeon who is currently the clinical director of the London Major Trauma Network, Professor of Trauma Sciences at Queen Mary University of London and a Consultant vascular and trauma surgeon for Barts Health NHS Trust at the Royal London Hospital.

== Early life ==
Brohi was born on 28 August 1968 in London to Ali Hassan Brohi and Philomena Brohi. He attended the Forest School in London and received a dual degree from University College London, obtaining both a BSc in Computer Science and an MB BS Medicine.

Professor Brohi trained in general surgery and anaesthesia, and holds Fellowships by examination from both the Royal College of Surgeons of England and Royal College of Anaesthetists. He completed specialist training in general and vascular surgery in London, and gained additional experience in trauma surgery in Cape Town and San Francisco, where he completed a trauma and critical care surgery fellowship. He has extensive prehospital experience as both a Doctor on London’s Air Ambulance and subsequently as the Clinical Director

== Career ==
Karim Brohi is a Professor of Trauma Sciences and founding director of the Centre for Trauma Sciences, and Director of the pan-faculty Crisis Prevention, Management and Recovery Network. He is a consultant trauma and vascular surgeon at the Royal London Major Trauma Centre, part of Barts Health NHS Trust; and director of the London Major Trauma System for NHS England. He is also a Non-Executive Director of the London Ambulance Service NHS Trust.

Professor Brohi founded the MSc in Trauma Sciences programme at the Centre for Trauma Sciences. Beginning in 2011, the programme now has hundreds of alumni around the world. Professor Brohi continues to deliver trauma education through online media as well as being invited keynote speaker at many events worldwide.

Medical Research and Advancement

Professor Brohi’s own research has focused on the human biological response to being injury, and especially critical bleeding and its consequences. His work on failure of blood clotting after injury has led to a dramatic change in the management of bleeding over the past decade, reducing mortality by over 40%, and has been incorporated into national and international guidelines worldwide.

Professor Brohi coined the term 'acute traumatic coagulopathy' to describe how coagulopathy caused by traumatic injury results in more severe bleeding and organ failure.

Professor Brohi was instrumental in the development of the London Major Trauma System in 2010, and has been its clinical director since 2016. The London Major Trauma System is recognised around the world as being one of the most effective, equitable and advanced systems in the world delivering population-based injury care to over 15 million people across 35 trauma units, 4 major trauma centres and several regional prehospital care services. Systems restructuring, research and innovation across the system has led to a 50% reduction in mortality for all injured patients in the last decade. The system also provides major incident responses for mass casualty and terrorist events across London, and Professor Brohi has personally managed several incidents including a surgical commander for the London terror attacks in 2017.

In 2018 Professor Brohi received the American Heart Association’s Lifetime Achievement Award for Resuscitation Research for this work. He has led multiple national and international phase IIa, IIb and III clinical trials, and he has received funding from the National Institute for Health and Care Research (NIHR) and UKRI, Barts Charity, Rosetrees Charity and several commercial partners in the diagnostic, therapeutic and device industries.

== Publications ==
- Brohi, Karim, Jasmin Singh, Mischa Heron, and Timothy Coats. "Acute traumatic coagulopathy." Journal of Trauma and Acute Care Surgery 54, no. 6 (2003): 1127-1130. doi:10.1097/01.TA.0000069184.82147.06
- Hess, John R., Karim Brohi, Richard P. Dutton, Carl J. Hauser, John B. Holcomb, Yoram Kluger, Kevin Mackway-Jones et al. "The coagulopathy of trauma: a review of mechanisms." Journal of Trauma and Acute Care Surgery 65, no. 4 (2008): 748-754. doi:10.1097/TA.0b013e3181877a9c
- Brohi, Karim, Mitchell J. Cohen, Michael T. Ganter, Marcus J. Schultz, Marcel Levi, Robert C. Mackersie, and Jean-François Pittet. "Acute coagulopathy of trauma: hypoperfusion induces systemic anticoagulation and hyperfibrinolysis." Journal of Trauma and Acute Care Surgery 64, no. 5 (2008): 1211-1217. doi:10.1097/TA.0b013e318169cd3c
