= Kareem Kazeem =

Nigerian footballer

Personal information
- Full name: Kareem Olanrewaju Kazeem
- Date of birth: 21 May 1988 (age 38)
- Place of birth: Lagos, Nigeria
- Height: 1.70 m (5 ft 7 in)
- Position: Midfielder

Youth career
- 2004–2007: Fulham

Senior career*
Years	Team	Apps	(Gls)
2007–2010	Braga	0	(0)
2007–2008	→ Trofense (loan)	19	(0)
2008–2009	→ Gil Vicente (loan)	4	(0)
2009–2010	→ Oliveira Douro (loan)	4	(0)
2011	Benfica Castelo Branco	10	(0)
2011–2013	Vilaverdense	41	(3)
2013–2014	Leça	14	(0)
2014–2015	Lliswerry	20	(?)
2015–2018	Monmouth Town		
2018–2019	Cwmbran Celtic		
- * Club domestic league appearances and goals

Kareem Olanrewaju Kazeem (born 21 May 1988) is a Nigerian former footballer who played as a midfielder.

== Club career ==
Born in Lagos, Kazeem signed with Premier League club Fulham as a youngster. He was limited to reserve team football during his spell in England, and subsequently moved to Portugal where he would remain for the vast majority of his career.

In the 2007 off-season, Kazeem joined S.C. Braga who loaned him immediately to C.D. Trofense. He appeared regularly for the latter side, as they achieved a first-ever promotion to the Primeira Liga.

For 2008–09, Kazeem would be loaned again, also in the Segunda Liga, spending the season with Gil Vicente FC. In the following campaign, more of the same – still as a Braga player – now with C.F. Oliveira do Douro in the fourth division.

After cutting ties at the Estádio Municipal de Braga, Kazeem continued playing in the Portuguese lower leagues, first with Sport Benfica e Castelo Branco then Vilaverdense F.C. and Leça FC. He then took his game to Wales, signing with Lliswerry in 2014 and moving to Monmouth Town the following year.
