= Karim Sy =

Franco-Iibano-Malian-Senegalese businessman

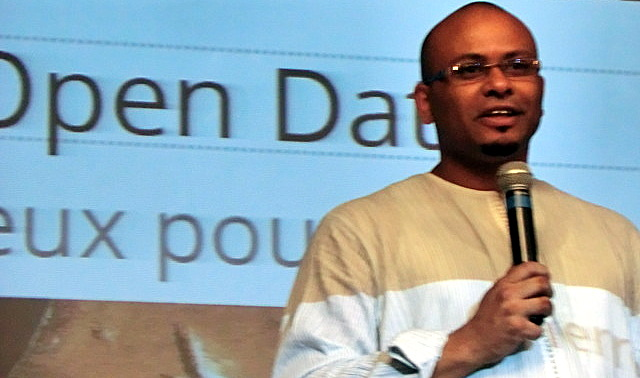
Karim Sy

Karim Sy (born 1971) is a Franco-Iibano-Malian-Senegalese businessman, born in France. He is an entrepreneur and business angel. Since August 2017, he has been a member of the Presidential Council for Africa.

== Early life ==
Karim Sy was born in 1971 in France to a Senegalese-born Malian father and a Lebanese mother. In 2010, Sy founded the nonprofit organization Jokkolabs, which operates in nine countries including France. Jokkolabs works to improve entrepreneurship and innovation in Africa by organizing new event formats, civil society engagement platforms, meetings and support for diverse communities. Sy was a member of the board of directors of the pan-African FOSSFA Foundation (2012–2014) and managing partner of Maarch West Africa SA (Senegal), a subsidiary of the ArchiveEco SAS Group (France).

He was elected Ashoka Fellow in 2012. Since February 2017, Sy has been a board member of the Global Entrepreneurship Network, GEN Africa, and GEN Europe and in August 2017, he joined the Presidential Council for Africa an organisation created by Emmanuel Macron the French president to improve the relationship between Africa and France.
