= Karim Asir =

Afghan comedian

Karim Asir is an Afghan mime artist, based in Kabul, who impersonates Charlie Chaplin.

== Childhood and studies ==
Karim Asir was born to Afghan parents in 1994 in Iran. His parents had fled Afghanistan when the Taliban started their main military campaign. At the age of 12 his family moved back to Afghanistan. At that point in his life he saw what decades of war had done to his country. Asir states "The buildings were all destroyed and everywhere was destroyed by the Taliban."

Asir studied theatre at Kabul University.

== Career in mime ==
After graduation from university, Asir wanted to apply his theatrical education to address social problems in Afghanistan. Asir was familiar with the work of the Charlie Chaplin through Iranian TV and had been attracted to acting since his childhood.

By 2018, Asir had started a career in Charlie Chaplin impersonations, acting in public and private venues including Kabul streets, public parks, private parties, charity events and an orphanage. In 2018, his videos had collected 1 million YouTube views.

Lisa Stein Haven, an English professor at Ohio University in Zanesville and a silent comedy scholar, explains her fascination with Karim Asir. Stein Haven emphasizes that there are "no words involved" and therefore "no language" and that Asir "didn't want to go to dialogue film, because he didn't want to put an English language on it" and that he could thereby "speak to people throughout the world through pantomime". Stein Haven points out that Charlie Chaplin "had fans in Russia, he had fans all over the world. I think he went to Bali in 1932 and he found that his films had been seen there. And Bali was relatively untouched at that time."

Asir stated that critics object to his performances, arguing that comedy is inappropriate for the multitude of problems that Afghanistan faces, such as a lack of water and housing. Asir agreed that the problems were significant, but argued that "we also need to be happy". He sees his acting as a chance for people to have some respite from armed conflict and insecurity.

== Repression ==
Asir has been threatened by "militants" who described his acting as "un-Islamic". He stated, "I am afraid of being targeted by suicide bombings or explosions but these issues cannot stop me carrying out my work and performances. I'll continue my performances despite these issues and threats which exist in the country".

== See also ==
- War in Afghanistan (2001–present)
