= Karim Yassen =

Karim Yassen is a Kurdish professor, who is known for finding the enzyme which causes gum disease. The research was done at Jagiellonian University in Poland.

He works in the department of biology of Irbil's Salahaddin University-Erbil as a lecturer.
