= Karim El Idrissi =

French footballer (born 1977)

Personal information
- Date of birth: 26 November 1977 (age 48)
- Place of birth: Auxerre, France
- Height: 1.75 m (5 ft 9 in)
- Position: Midfielder

Youth career
- 1993–1998: Auxerre

Senior career*
Years	Team	Apps	(Gls)
1998–2008	Auxerre B	185	(34)
2004	AJ Auxerre	1	(0)
2009–2010	Auxerre C	13	(3)
- * Club domestic league appearances and goals

Karim El Idrissi (born 26 November 1977) is a retired French football player of Moroccan origin, who last plays for AJ Auxerre.
