= Karim Oumarou =

Nigerien footballer

Personal information
- Date of birth: 7 January 1985 (age 41)
- Place of birth: Niamey, Niger
- Position: Right back

Senior career*
Years	Team	Apps	(Gls)
2006–2011	Sahel SC		

International career
2006–2008	Niger	10	(0)
- * Club domestic league appearances and goals

Karim Oumarou (born 7 January 1985) is a Nigerien football player. He played for the Niger national football team during 2010 FIFA World Cup qualification, scoring an own goal against Benin. He is the current captain of Sahel SC who play in the Niger Premier League. He is known to be a versatile defender, being able to fill in at any position across the back 4, as well as being a useful winger.
