= Karim H. Karim =

Karim H. Karim is a professor of journalism and Islamic studies at Carleton University, as well as an author. He has a B.A. from Columbia University and a M.A. and Ph.D. from McGill University. Before joining academia he worked as a reporter and then for the Department of Canadian Heritage. Karim won the inaugural Robinson Book Prize in 2001 from the Canadian Communication Association for his book Islamic Peril: Media and Global Violence.
