= Karim Franceschi =

Italian soldier and author

Karim Marcello Franceschi
- Born: Karim Marcello Franceschi; March 31, 1989 (age 37); Casablanca, Morocco
- Military career
- Allegiance: SDF
- Branches: YPG
- Service years: 2015–2017
- Rank: Commander
- Nickname: Marcello
- Unit: YPG International
- Known for: Leading YPG International in the Battle of Raqqa (2017)
- Conflicts: Syrian Civil War; Siege of Kobanê; Battle of Sarrin (June–July 2015); Manbij offensive; Battle of Raqqa (2017) (WIA)
- Other work: Activist, writer

Karim Marcello Franceschi (born March 31, 1989, in Casablanca) is an Italian activist, writer, and former soldier. He is best known for his involvement in the Syrian Civil War, where he fought with the People's Protection Units (YPG) against the Islamic State. He authored the book Il combattente, a memoir detailing his experiences in the war, which was published by Bur Rizzoli.

Franceschi's combat experience includes participating in the Siege of Kobanê and serving as a commander in the Battle of Raqqa (2017).

== Biography ==
Karim Marcello Franceschi was born in Morocco to an Italian father and a Moroccan mother. At the age of seven, he moved with his family to Senigallia, Italy. During his youth, Franceschi became involved with the Arvultura social center, where he participated in various solidarity initiatives. In 2015, following his involvement in a project supporting the Kurdish people, he enlisted in the People's Protection Units (YPG), the military force of Syrian Kurdistan. During his deployment in Kobanê, Franceschi began writing his book Il combattente: Storia dell'italiano che ha difeso Kobanê dall'ISIS.

In 2017, Franceschi took part in the liberation of Raqqa as the commander of an international brigade within the YPG International, a unit composed of Western volunteers who had joined the fight against the Islamic State Franceschi led the brigade in key operations during the city's siege, contributing to the liberation of strategic sectors of Raqqa and fighting on the front lines against ISIS forces. During these operations, Franceschi led his team through a series of intense clashes, utilizing his linguistic and military skills to coordinate the brigade’s actions with Kurdish command and ensure communication between the international fighters and local forces.

Franceschi was injured during an operation near Raqqa, but he continued to fulfill his role as a leader until the city's final liberation. This experience was recounted in his second book, Non morirò stanotte, published in 2018.

== Publications ==
- Il combattente – edizioni BUR, Milano, 2016 – ISBN 978-88-17-08554-0
- Non morirò stanotte – edizioni BUR, Milano, 2018 – ISBN 978-88-17-10199-8
