= Kareem Irfan =

Kareem Irfan became Chairman of the Council of Islamic Organizations of Greater Chicago (CIOGC) in January 2001 and held the position until December 2007. The CIOGC is a broad-based federation that serves over 400,000 Muslim Americans. Prior to 2001, he was involved in a number of council projects, co-chairing its Bosnian Refugee Relocation Project and chairing its Media Relations Committee.

He has worked together with the Islamic Society of North America (ISNA) in many areas including program development, presentations, and media relations for ISNA's annual conventions, and was a founding member of the ISNA Wills & Living Trusts Initiative. He now sits on the board of directors of the Islamic Center of Naperville and continues to do pro bono work for non-profit, religious, and professional institutions.

Mr. Irfan works as assistant general counsel for the North American Division of Square D Co. - Schneider Electric, a French global manufacturer of electrical distribution, automation and control products. He has a master's degree in computer engineering from University of Illinois and a J.D. from DePaul University. Recently he has served as secretary and board director of the Intellectual Property Law Association of Chicago and as chairman of its Inventor Services Committee.

== Awards ==
Mr. Irfan has earned the Distinguished Community Leadership Award from the U.S. Dept. of Justice; the Distinguished Interfaith Collaboration Award from Mayor Richard Daley of Chicago; the Outstanding Religious Services Award from Imam W.D. Mohammed’s African-American Muslim Community; and the Community Service Award from the Muslim Bar Association.

== See also ==
- Suhaib Webb
- Naperville, Illinois
