= Kyrgyz people =

Turkic ethnic group

кыргыздар kyrgyzdar قیرغیزدار
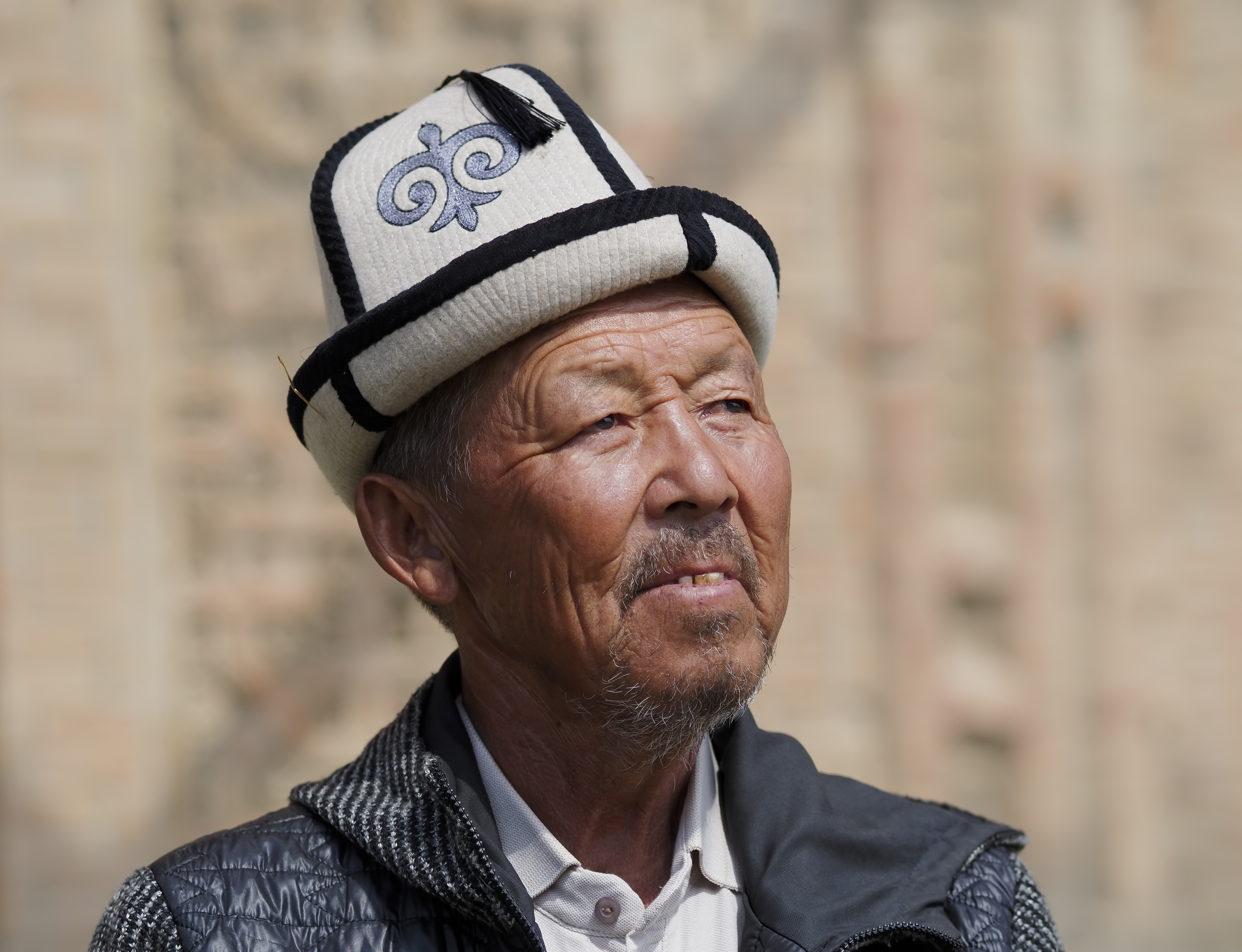
- Kyrgyz man with an ak-kalpak hat (Özgön, 2025)

Total population
- c. 6–7 million

Regions with significant populations
- Kyrgyzstan: 5.8 million (2026 est.)
- Uzbekistan: 291,628 (2021 est.)
- China: 204,402 (2020 census)
- Russia: 148,516 (2021 census)
- Kazakhstan: 40,200 (2025 est.)
- Tajikistan: 38,600 (2020 census)
- Turkey: 24,815 (2025)
- Pakistan: 18,000 (2023)

Languages
- Kyrgyz

Religion
- Predominantly Islam

Related ethnic groups
- Teleuts, Telengits, Altai-Kizhi, Kazakhs, Siberian Tatars, and other Turkic peoples, along with Sart Kalmyks

The Kyrgyz people (Note: Also spelled Kyrghyz, Kirgiz, or Kirghiz.) (Note: /ˈkɪərɡɪz/ KEER-giz or /ˈkɜːrɡɪz/ KUR-giz; Kyrgyz: Кыргыздар, romanized: Kyrgyzdar, arabized: قیرغیزدار, pronounced [qɯɾɢɯzdɑ́ɻ]) are a Turkic ethnic group native to Central Asia. They primarily reside in Kyrgyzstan, Uzbekistan, China, Afghanistan, and Pakistan. (Note: The Pamiri Kyrgyz people of Pakistan and Afghanistan make up a notable minority.) A Kyrgyz diaspora is also found in Russia, Tajikistan, and Kazakhstan. They speak the Kyrgyz language, which is the official language of Kyrgyzstan.

The earliest people known as "Kyrgyz" were the descendants of several Central Asian tribes, first emerging in western Mongolia around 201 BC. Modern Kyrgyz people are descended in part from the Yenisei Kyrgyz that lived in the Yenisey river valley in Siberia. The Kyrgyz people later established Kyrgyz khanate in the 15th century.

== Etymology ==
There are several theories on the origin of ethnonym Kyrgyz. It is often said to be derived from the Turkic word kyrk ("forty"), with -iz being an old plural suffix, so Kyrgyz literally means "a collection of forty tribes". It also means "imperishable", "inextinguishable", "immortal", "unconquerable" or "unbeatable", as well as its association with the epic hero Manas, who – according to a founding myth – unified the 40 tribes against the Khitans. A rival myth, recorded in 1370 in the History of Yuan, concerns 40 women born on a steppe motherland.

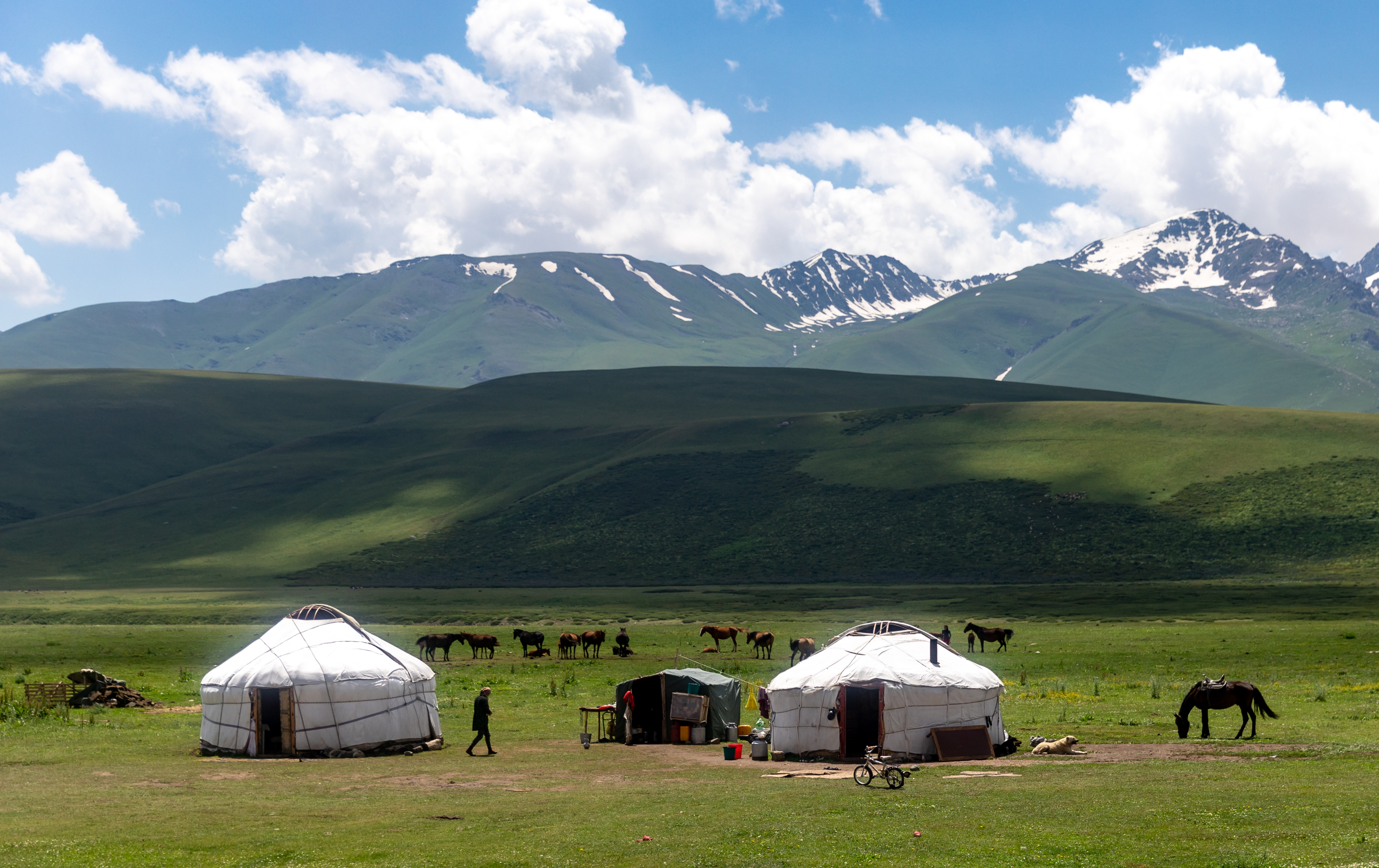
Nomads in Kyrgyzstan

The earliest records of the ethnonym appear to have been the Chinese transcriptions Gekun (鬲昆, LH *kek-kuən < Old Chinese: *krêk-kûn) and Jiankun (堅昆, LH *ken-kuən < OC: *kên-kûn). Those suggest that the original ethnonym was *kirkur ~ kirgur and/or *kirkün, and another transcription Jiegu (結骨, EMC: *kέt-kwət) suggests *kirkut / kirgut. Yury Zuev proposed that the ethnonym possibly means 'field people, field Huns' (cf. Tiele tribal name 渾 Hún < MC *ɣuən). Peter Golden reconstructs *Qïrğïz < *Qïrqïz< *Qïrqïŕ and suggests a derivation from Old Turkic qır 'gray' (horse color) plus suffix -q(X)r/ğ(X)r ~ k(X)z/g(X)z. Besides, Chinese scholars later used a number of different transcriptions for the Kyrgyz people: these include Gegu (紇骨), Jiegu (結骨), Hegu (紇骨), Hegusi (紇扢斯), Hejiasi (紇戛斯), Hugu (護骨), Qigu (契骨), or Juwu (居勿), and then, during the reign of Tang Emperor Wuzong, Xiajiasi (黠戛斯), said to mean "red face". Edwin G. Pulleyblank surmises that "red face" was possibly a folk etymology provided by an interpreter who explained the ethnonym based on Turkic qïzïl ~ qizqil, meaning 'red'. By the time of the Mongol Empire, the ethnonym's original meaning had apparently been forgotten – as was shown by variations in readings of it across different reductions of the History of Yuan. This may have led to the adoption of Kyrgyz and its mythical explanation.

During the 18th and 19th centuries, European writers used the early Romanized form Kirghiz – from the contemporary Russian киргизы – to refer not only to the modern Kyrgyz, but also to their more numerous northern relatives, the Kazakhs. When distinction had to be made, more specific terms were used: the Kyrgyz proper were known as the Kara-Kirghiz ("Black Kirghiz", from the colour of their tents), and the Kazakhs were named the Kirghiz-Kaisak or "Kirghiz-Kazak".

== Origins ==
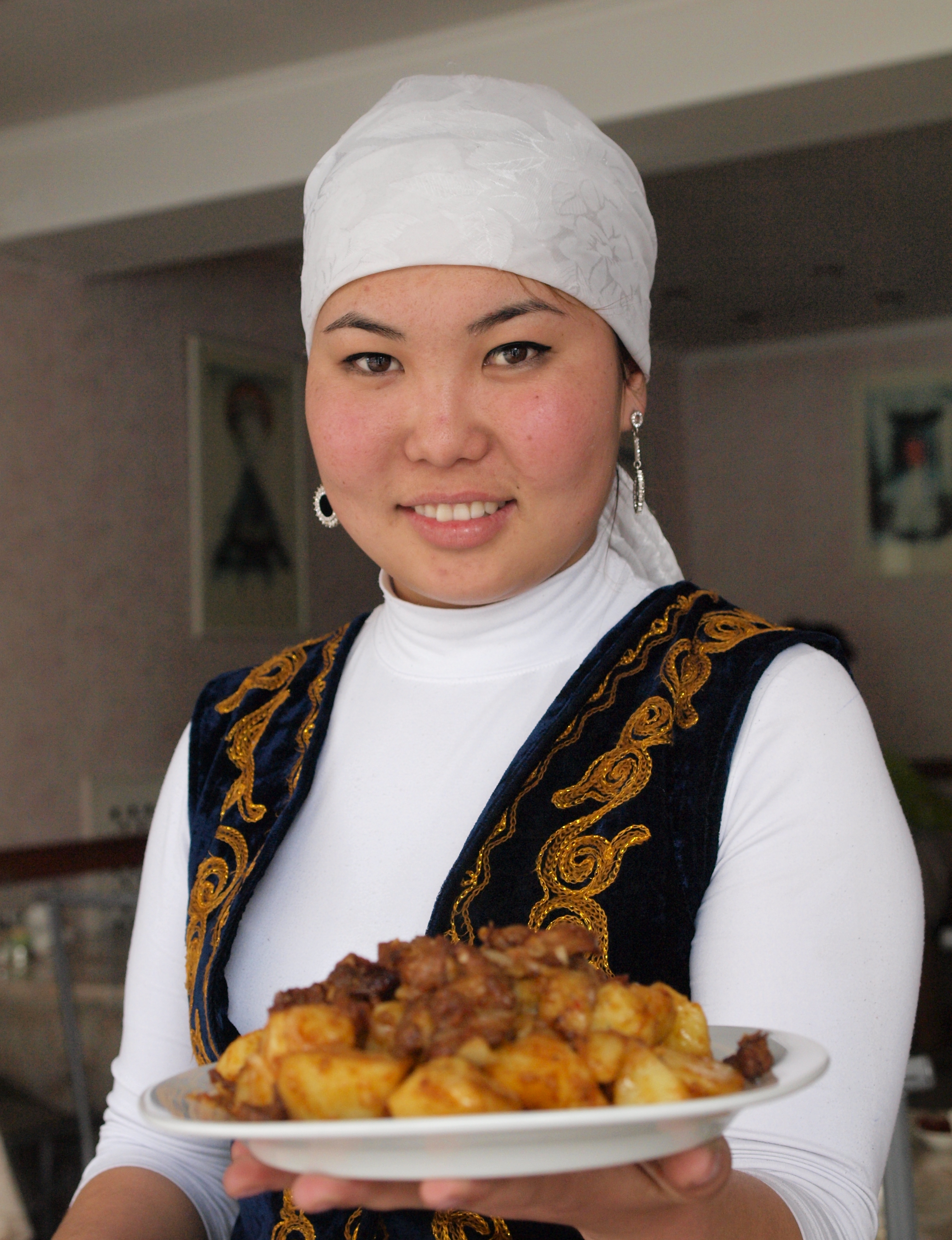
A Kyrgyz woman

The Kyrgyz are a Turkic ethnic group. It has been suggested Turkic peoples either descended from pastoralist or farming populations in Altaic (re-labelled as Transeurasian) hypothesis, and the Altaic hypothesis has been widely rejected. Turkic urheimat has been suggested to be placed somewhere between Transcaspian Steppe and Manchuria; Amur or Northeast China also are amongst the suggestions along with South Siberia. By the early 1st millennium BC, these peoples had become equestrian nomads. In subsequent centuries, the steppe populations of Central Asia appear to have been progressively Turkified by an East Asian dominant minority moving out of Mongolia.

The oldest notes about a definite mention of the Kyrgyz ethnonym originate from the 6th century. The Kyrgyz as an ethnic group are mentioned quite unambiguously during the time of Genghis Khan's rule (1162–1227), when their name replaces the former name Khakas.

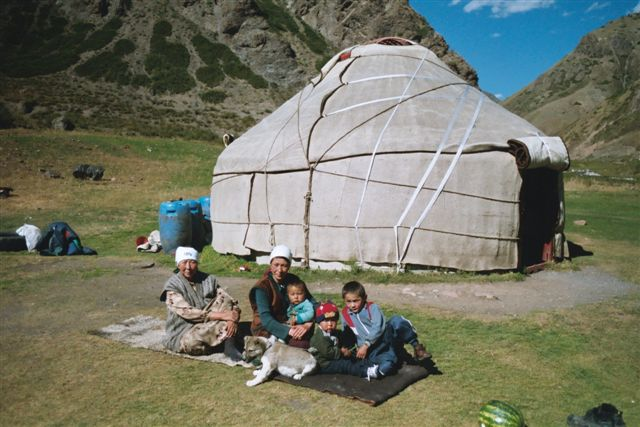
A Kyrgyz family

18th-century Qing administrators referred to the Kyrgyz by the name Bulute.

=== Possible Yenisei Kyrgyz affiliation ===
The Yenisei Kyrgyz, whose 9–10th century migration to the Tienshan area was of "particularly great importance for the formative process" of the modern Kyrgyz, have their origins in the western parts of modern-day Mongolia and first appear in written records in the Chinese annals of the Sima Qian's Records of the Grand Historian (compiled 109–91 BCE) as Gekun (鬲昆, 隔昆) or Jiankun (堅昆). The Middle Age Chinese composition Tang Huiyao of the 8–10th century transcribed the name "Kyrgyz" as Jiegu (Kirgut), and their tamga was depicted as identical to the tamga of the present-day Kyrgyz tribes Azyk, Bugu, Cherik, Sary Bagysh and a few others.

The description of the Yenisei Kyrgyz as "large, with red hair, white faces, and green or blue eyes" in the New Book of Tang (11th century) have tempted a number of researchers to assume that the Kyrgyz may have originally been non-Turkic or at least an ethnically mixed people with a large non-Turkic element. The New Book of Tang did not consider the Yenisei Kyrgyz to be the same as the Tiele people, but states that they had the same language and script as the Uyghurs, who were part of the Tiele tribes. The Yenisei Kyrgyz were described to look similar to the neighboring "Boma tribe" (Basmyl), who did not share the same language, implying that the Yenisei Kyrgyz may have originally been a non-Turkic people. According to the You yang za zu by Duan Chengshi in the 9th century AD, the Yenisei Kyrgyz were not of wolf descent, unlike the Türks, but were born in a cave north of the Quman Mountain as the offspring of a god and a cow. Based on these historical descriptions, Lee & Kuang suggest that the Yenisei Kyrgyz were turcophone, but may have been of non-Turkic origin, and were Turkified through inter-tribal marriage. Contemporary Persian writer Gardizi recounted a legend that ascribed these traits to Saqaliba ancestry in the tribe.

In 840, a revolt led by the Yenisei Kyrgyz brought down the Uyghur Khaganate, and brought the Yenisei Kyrgyz to a dominating position in the former Second Turkic Khaganate. With the rise to power, the center of the Kyrgyz Khaganate moved to Jeti-su, and brought about a spread south of the Kyrgyz to Tian Shan and Xinjiang, bringing them into contact with the existing peoples of what is now Western China, especially the Tibetan Empire.

The Khagans of the Yenisei Kyrgyz Khaganate claimed descent from the Han Chinese general Li Ling, which was mentioned in the diplomatic correspondence between the Kyrgyz khagan and the Tang dynasty emperor, since the Tang imperial Li family claimed descent from Li Ling's grandfather, Li Guang. The Kyrgyz qaghan assisted the Tang dynasty in destroying the Uyghur Khaganate and rescuing the Princess Taihe from the Uyghurs. They also killed a Uyghur khagan in the process.

Then Kyrgyz quickly moved as far as the Tian Shan range and maintained their dominance over this territory for about 200 years. In the 12th century, however, Kyrgyz domination had shrunk to the Altai and Sayan Mountains as a result of Mongol expansion. With the rise of the Mongol Empire in the 13th century, the Kyrgyz migrated south. In 1207, after the establishment of Yekhe Mongol Ulus (Mongol empire), Genghis Khan's oldest son Jochi occupied Kyrgyzstan without resistance. The state remained a Mongol vassal until the late 14th century. Various Turkic peoples ruled them until 1685, when they came under the control of the Oirats (Dzungars), which lasted until 1757. Many Kyrgyz tribes that had fled the Dzungars returned to modern Kyrgyzstan at this time.

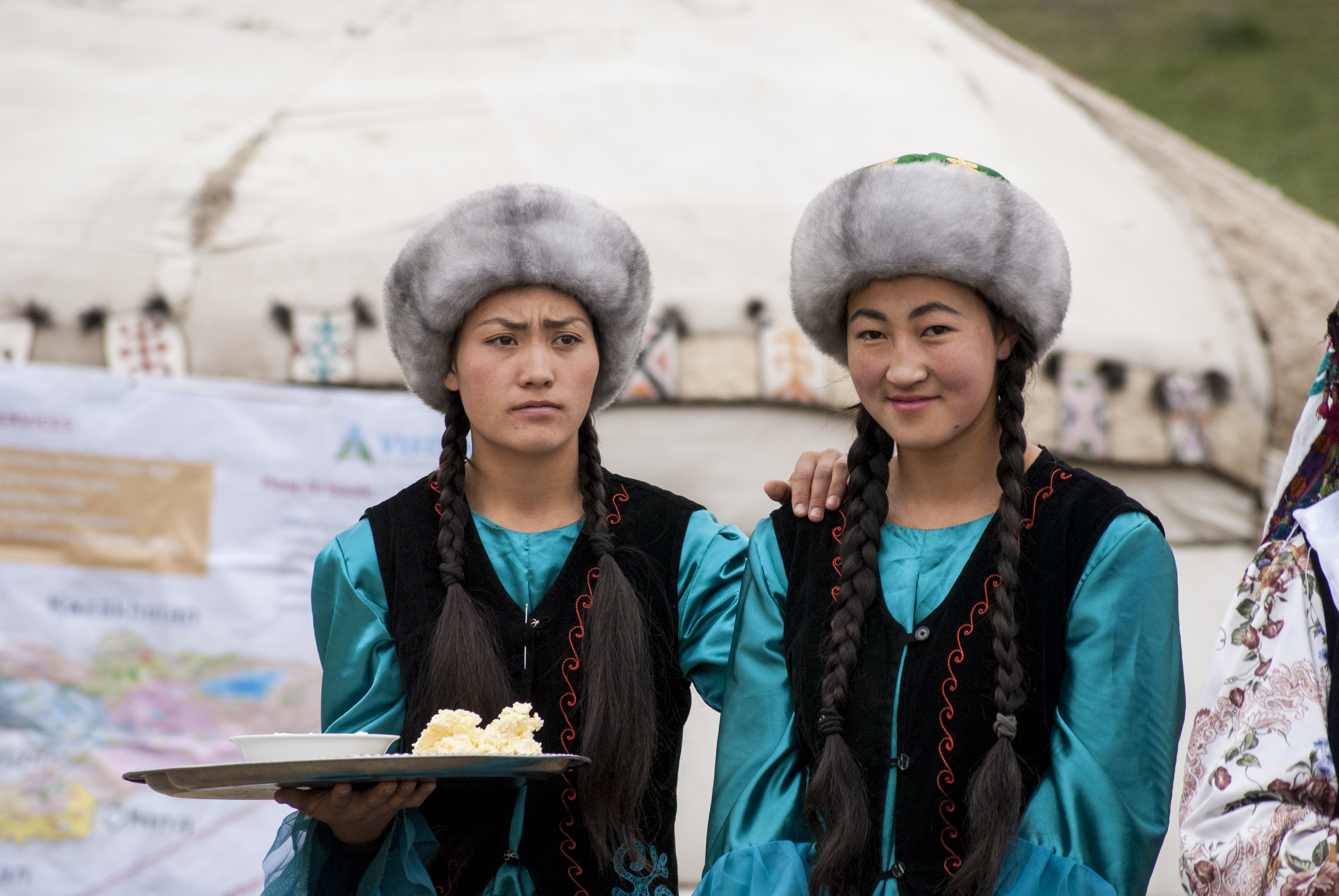
Kyrgyz women offering butter and salt

By the 16th century, the carriers of the ethnonym Kirgiz lived in South Siberia, Xinjiang, Tian Shan, Pamir-Alay, Middle Asia, Urals (among Bashkirs), and in Kazakhstan. In the Tian Shan and Xinjiang area, the term Kyrgyz retained its unifying political designation, and became a general ethnonym for the Yenisei Kirgiz and other Turkic tribes that presently constitute the Kyrgyz population. Though it is impossible to directly identify the Yenisei and Tien Shan Kyrgyz, a trace of their ethnogenetical connections is apparent in archaeology, history, language and ethnography. A majority of modern researchers came to the conclusion that the ancestors of Kyrgyz tribes had their origin in the most ancient tribal unions of Sakas/Scythians, Wusun/Issedones, Dingling, Mongols, and Huns.

=== Genetics ===
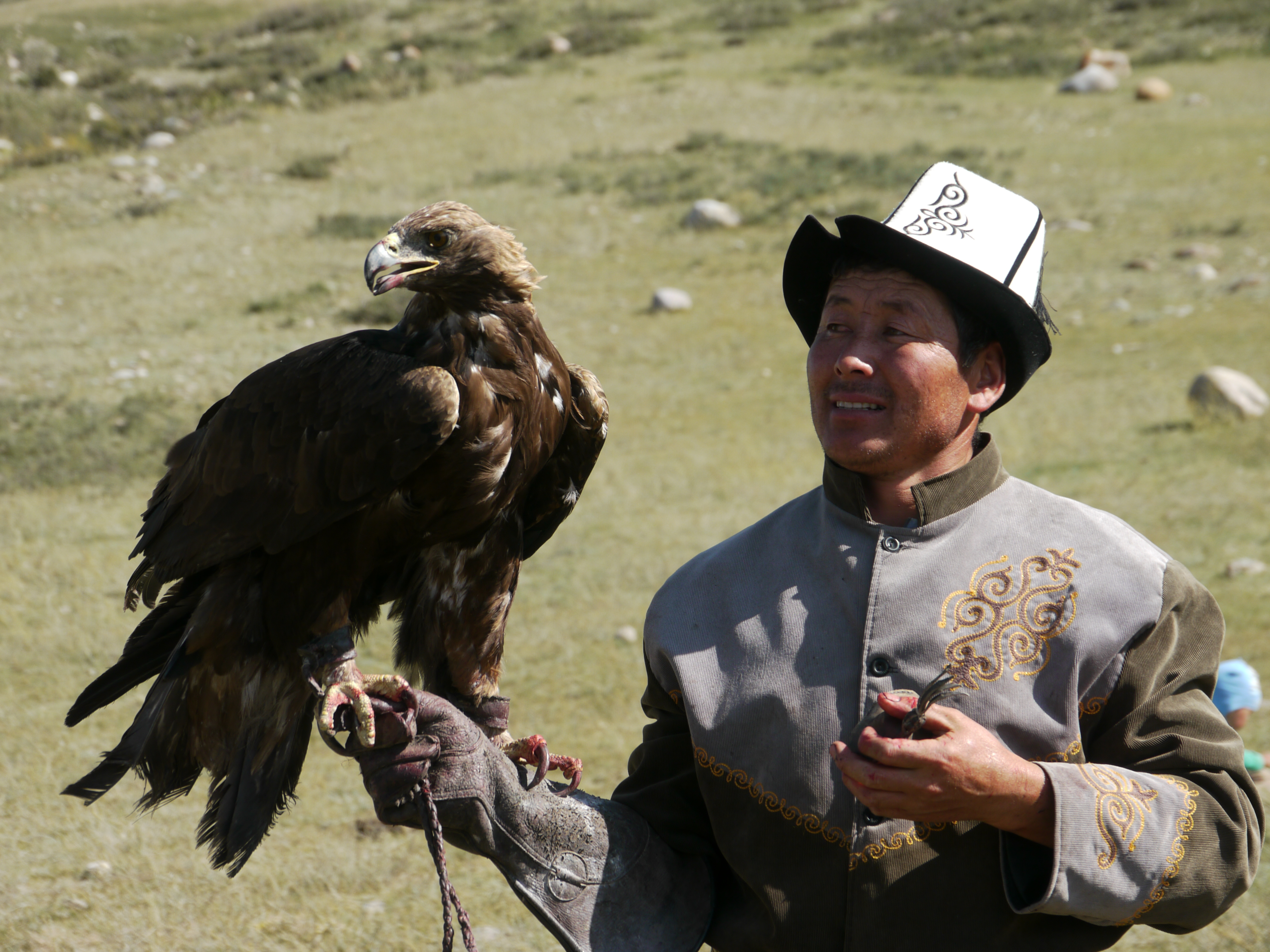
Kyrgyz falconer in the Barskoon valley

==== Haplogroups ====
The genetic makeup of the Kyrgyz is consistent with their origin as a mix of tribes. For instance, 63% of modern Kyrgyz men of Jumgal District belong to the paternal haplogroup R1a1. Low diversity of Kyrgyz R1a1 indicates a founder effect within the historical period. Other groups of Kyrgyz especially Southwest Kyrgyz show a considerably lower frequency of haplogroup R. The other main haplogroups of modern Kyrgyz are haplogroup C-M217 at 12–20%, haplogroup O-M175 at 0–15%, and haplogroup N-M231 at around 4.5%.

Depending on the geographical location of samples, West Eurasian mtDNA haplogroup lineages make up 27% to 42.6% in the Kyrgyz, with haplogroup mtDNA H being the most predominant West Eurasian mtDNA haplogroup at about 14.2% (range 8.3% Talas to 21.3% Sary-Tash) among the Kyrgyz. However, the majority of Kyrgyz belong to East Eurasian mtDNA haplogroups, with mtDNA haplogroup D (approx. 20.2%, range 14.6% Talas to 25.5% Sary-Tash) and D4 in particular (approx. 18.5%) being the most frequent Eastern Eurasian lineage among them.

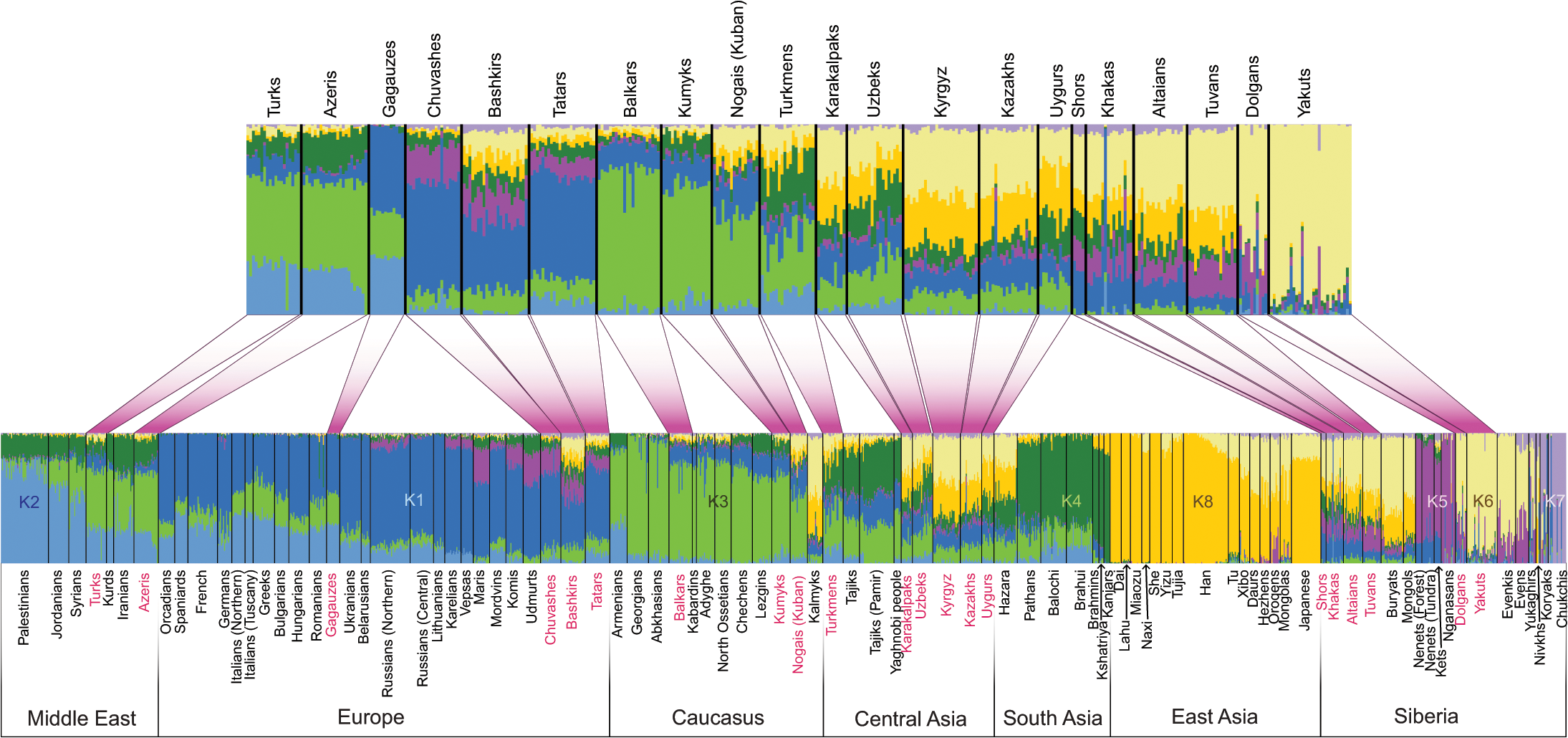
Population structure of Turkic-speaking populations in the context of their geographic neighbors across Eurasia; modern Kyrgyz derive the majority of ancestry from Ancient Northeast Asian sources, compactible with the inferred Turkic homeland in 'Southern Siberia and Mongolia'.

==== Autosomal DNA ====
A 2011 study of autosomal ancestry found that East Eurasian ancestry is predominant in most Kyrgyz living in Kyrgyzstan. East Eurasian ancestry makes up roughly two-thirds with exceptions of Kyrgyz living in Tajikistan and the western areas of Kyrgyzstan, where it forms only half. A 2022 study found that Kyrgyz people derive most of their ancestry from Northern East Asian sources. Kyrgyz from China were found to have more West Eurasian-like ancestry than the Kyrgyz from Kyrgyzstan. The Kyrgyz are inferred to derive most of their ancestry from "Neolithic, Bronze, and Iron Age populations from northern China and Mongolia" (59.3–69.8%), suggesting "genetic continuity" with them. Their West Eurasian-like ancestry (24.9–37.5%) is represented by a combination of Bronze Age Western Steppe Herders and "Iranian Farmer-related" ancestries (BMAC). They also harbor minor ancestry associated with the earliest Tarim mummies (3.2–5.3%).

A 2023 study analyzed the genome of 70 Kyrgyz individuals from Southern Xinjiang (SXJK). The authors found that the SXJK samples display genetic heterogenity and form two clusters along a 'Turkic cline', which stretched from East Asians at the one end to "Indo-Europeans" at the other end. The main cluster had 63.3–83.3% Ancient Northeast Asian ancestry, with the remainder ancestry being derived from West Eurasian (Western Steppe Herders) and Tarim_EMBA-like sources, and displayed high genetic affinity to Kazakhs and contemporary Kyrgyz from Kyrgyzstan. The secondary cluster had 47.2–55.6% Ancient Northeast Asian ancestry and higher West Eurasian ancestry, particularly via additional BMAC-related admixture (9.1–27.8%), and clustered closer to modern Uyghurs. A 2025 study stated that there were more genetic similarities between Kyrgyz from Kyrgyzstan and Xinjiang than between northern and southern Han Chinese, with Kyrgyz from Xinjiang being modeled as a mixture of East Asian (41.7%), Siberian (25.6%), West Eurasian (25.2%) and South Asian (7.6%) ancestries. Kyrgyz from Xinjiang are also closely related to other Central Asians such as Uyghurs, Kazakhs and Hazaras but have less West Eurasian and South Asian ancestry than Uyghurs especially.

== Religion ==
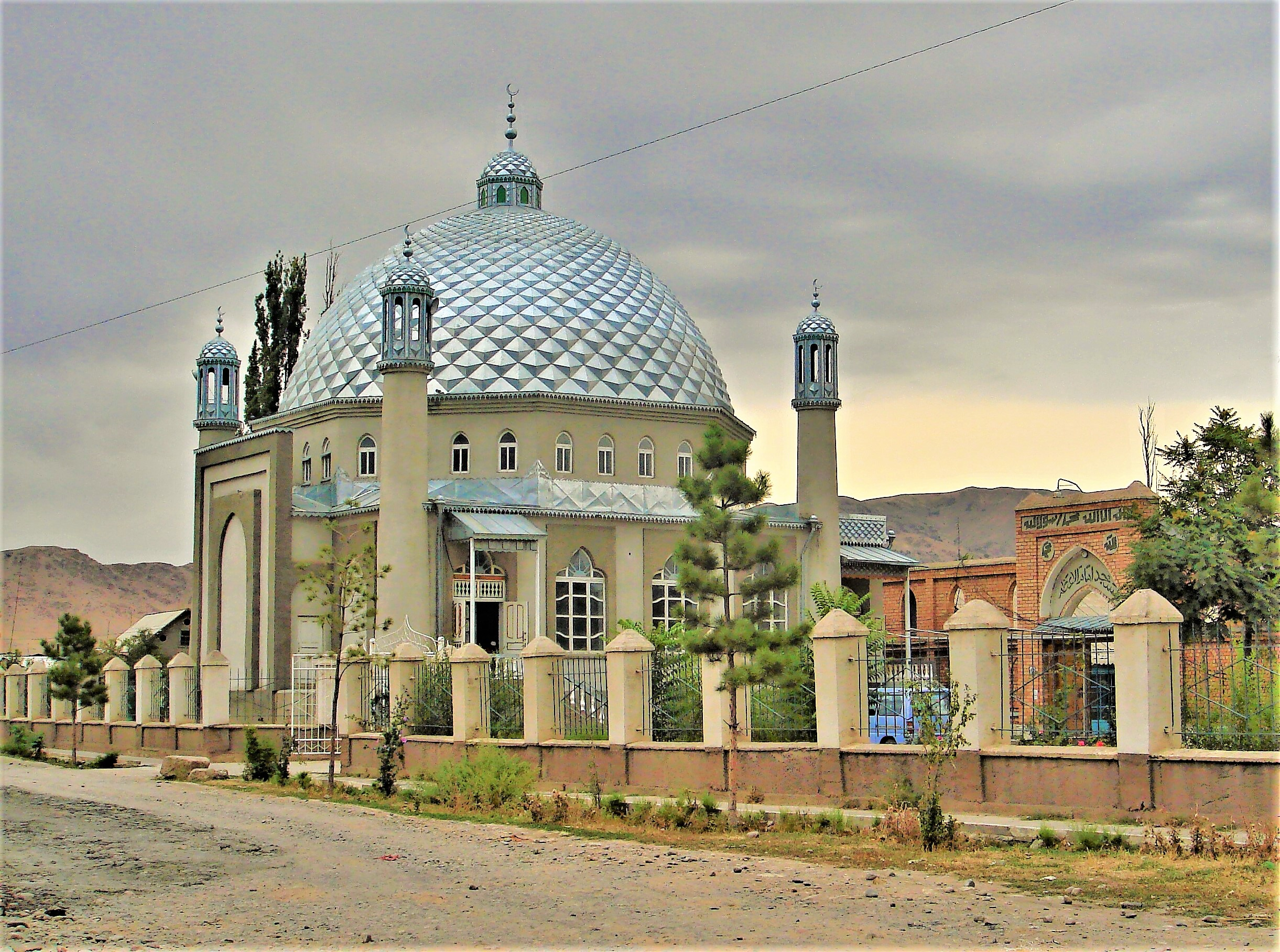
A mosque in Tokmok, Kyrgyzstan

Kyrgyz are predominantly Muslims of the Hanafi school of Sunni Islam. Islam was first introduced by Arab traders who travelled along the Silk Road in the 7th and 8th centuries. In the 8th century, orthodox Islam reached the Fergana Valley with the Uzbeks. However, in the 10th-century Persian text Hudud al-'Alam, the Kyrgyz were still described as a people who "venerate the Fire and burn the dead".

The Kyrgyz began to convert to Islam in the mid-17th century. Sufi missionaries played an important role in the conversion. By the 19th century, the Kyrgyz were considered devout Muslims and some performed the Hajj.

Atheism has some following in the northern regions under Russian communist influence. A few cultural rituals of Shamanism are practiced to this day, particularly in Central Kyrgyzstan. During a July 2007 interview, Bermet Akayeva, the daughter of Askar Akayev, the former President of Kyrgyzstan, stated that Islam was increasingly taking root, even in the northern regions which had been under communist influence. She emphasized that many mosques have been built and that the Kyrgyz are "increasingly devoting themselves to Islam".

Many ancient indigenous beliefs and practices, including shamanism and totemism, coexisted syncretically with Islam. Shamans, most of whom are women, still play a prominent role at funerals, memorials, and other ceremonies and rituals. This split between the northern and southern Kyrgyz in their religious adherence to Muslim practices can still be seen today. Likewise, the Sufi order of Islam has been one of the most active Muslim groups in Kyrgyzstan for more than a century.

Safavid Iran exerted some religious and cultural influence into Central Asia. This influence reached certain Turkic tribes, including some Kyrgyz clans, leading to their conversion to Shia Islam. Twelverism was dominant among the Kyrgyz Shias. Some Kyrgyz Shias in the Pamir Mountains and adjacent areas were influenced by Nizari Ismaili teachings. The Kyrgyz tribes located near Badakhshan, Hazarajat, and parts of Tajikistan came into contact with established Ismaili Shia communities. There had also been Kyrgyz Shia communities in eastern Kyrgyzstan, near borders with Tajikistan and China, where distinct Shia religious traditions persisted alongside Kyrgyz nomadic culture. In northern Afghanistan, the Kyrgyz Shias also integrated Shia Islam with their local cultural practices. Kyrgyz Shias in Kyrgyzstan, Afghanistan, and Tajikistan all remained marginalized due to their small numbers and the dominant Sunni national identity in all countries.

== Outside Kyrgyzstan ==
=== Afghanistan ===
The Kyrgyz population of Afghanistan was 1,130 in 2003, all from eastern Wakhan District in the Badakhshan Province of northeastern Afghanistan. They still lead a nomadic lifestyle and are led by a khan or tekin.

The suppression of the 1916 rebellion against Russian rule in Central Asia caused many Kyrgyz later to migrate to China and Afghanistan. Most of the Kyrgyz refugees in Afghanistan settled in the Wakhan region. Until 1978, the northeastern portion of Wakhan was home to about 3–5 thousand ethnic Kyrgyz. In 1978, most Kyrgyz inhabitants fled to Pakistan in the aftermath of the Saur Revolution. They requested 5,000 visas from the United States consulate in Peshawar for resettlement in Alaska, a state of the United States which they thought might have a similar climate and temperature with the Wakhan Corridor. Their request was denied. In the meantime, the heat and the unsanitary conditions of the refugee camp were killing off the Kyrgyz refugees at an alarming rate. Turkey, which was under the military coup rule of General Kenan Evren, stepped in, and resettled the entire group in the Lake Van region of Turkey in 1982. The village of Ulupamir (or "Great Pamir" in Kyrgyz) in Erciş in Van Province was given to these, where more than 5,000 of them still reside today. The documentary film 37 Uses for a Dead Sheep – the Story of the Pamir Kirghiz was based on the life of these Kyrgyz in their new home. Some Kyrgyz returned to Wakhan in October 1979, following the Soviet occupation of Afghanistan. They are found around the Little Pamir.

=== China ===
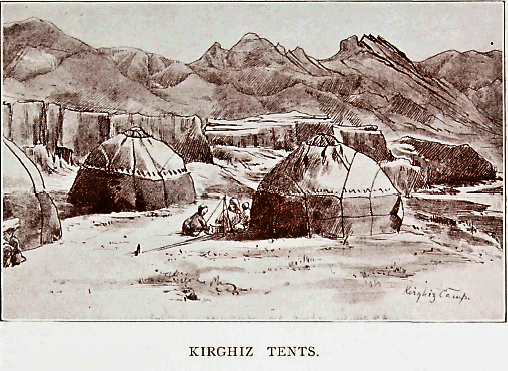
"Kirgiz Tents" or yurts. 1914

The Kyrgyz form one of the 56 ethnic groups officially recognized by the People's Republic of China. There are more than 145,000 Kyrgyz in China. They are known in Mandarin Chinese as Kē'ěrkèzī zú (simplified Chinese: 柯尔克孜族; traditional Chinese: 柯爾克孜族).

In the 19th century, Russian settlers on traditional Kyrgyz land drove a lot of the Kyrgyz over the border to China, causing their population to increase in China. Compared to Russian controlled areas, more benefits were given to the Muslim Kyrgyz on the Chinese controlled areas. Russian settlers fought against the Muslim nomadic Kyrgyz, which led the Russians to believe that the Kyrgyz would be a liability in any conflict against China. The Muslim Kyrgyz were sure that in an upcoming war, China would defeat Russia.

The Kyrgyz of Xinjiang revolted in the 1932 Kyrgyz rebellion, and also participated in the 1933 Battle of Kashgar and again in 1934.

They are found mainly in the Kizilsu Kyrgyz Autonomous Prefecture in the southwestern part of the Xinjiang Uygur Autonomous Region, with a smaller remainder found in the neighboring Wushi (Uqturpan), Aksu, Shache (Yarkand), Yingisar, Taxkorgan and Pishan (Guma), and in Tekes, Zhaosu (Monggolkure), Emin (Dorbiljin), Bole (Bortala), Jinghev (Jing) and Gongliu County in northern Xinjiang. In Akto County, the Akto Turkmen, a former Kyrgyz tribe, now speaks Uyghur.

A peculiar group, also included under the "Kyrgyz nationality" by the PRC official classification, are the so-called "Fuyu Kyrgyz". It is a group of several hundred Yenisei Kyrgyz (Khakas people) people whose forefathers were relocated from the Yenisei river region to Dzungaria by the Dzungar Khanate in the 17th century, and upon defeat of the Dzungars by the Qing dynasty, they were relocated from Dzungaria to Manchuria in the 18th century, and who now live in Wujiazi Village in Fuyu County, Heilongjiang Province. Their language (the Fuyü Gïrgïs dialect) is related to the Khakas language.

Certain segments of the Kyrgyz in China are followers of Tibetan Buddhism.

=== Pakistan ===
Kyrgyz are the only Turkic people native to Pakistan. The Kyrgyz in Pakistan live mostly in the north, primarily Chitral, where Kyrgyz is the only Turkic language spoken in Pakistan. There are only a few thousand left, and many have assimilated with Pashtun or the Kho. They used to dominate the region of Gilgit-Baltistan. There are also Afghan refugees of Kyrgyz origin in Pakistan. Some also come from Kyrgyzstan from the Soviet–Afghan War where some defected and settled in Pakistan. There are also Kyrgyz nationals who work in Pakistan.

=== United States ===
The Kyrgyz American Foundation (KAF) is a registered non-profit organization with the mission to strengthen civil, humanitarian, cultural and business ties between Kyrgyzstan and the United States by advancing intercultural awareness and cooperation. While preserving the multicultural heritage of Kyrgyzstan, KAF strives to cultivate a strong sense of identity for Kyrgyz Americans living in the US through cultural and educational initiatives.

The Kyrgyz-Washington Sister Region Organization was established in 2019. The organization is governed by a board of directors consisting of business, government, and community leaders, as well as ordinary citizens, in Wenatchee, Washington. The mission of the Kyrgyz-Washington Sister Region Organization is to foster cross-cultural understanding and professional development between Kyrgyzstan and Washington State. The mission is carried out through exchanges of delegations between the two regions and by undertaking professional analysis and advances in Kyrgyzstan and Washington State in the areas of agricultural development, outdoor recreational tourism, and water resource management.

== Notable people ==
- Chinghiz Aitmatov, author
- Dinara Akulova, singer
- Almazbek Atambayev, politician
- Ömürbek Babanov, businessman and politician
- Kurmanbek Bakiyev, politician
- Baitik Batyr, 19th-century politician
- Jantay Batyr, 19th-century statesman
- Altynai Botoyarova, model
- Malika Dina, singer
- Sadyr Japarov, politician
- Ishenbai Kadyrbekov, politician
- Samara Karimova, singer
- Ormon Khan, 19th-century khan
- Jolon Mamytov, aqyn
- Ulukbek Maripov, politician
- Melis Myrzakmatov, politician
- Roza Otunbayeva, politician
- Salamat Sadikova, folk singer

== See also ==
- Akto Turkmen
- Chala Kazak
- Culture of Kyrgyzstan
- Epic of Manas
- History of Kyrgyzstan
- Kyrgyz language
  - Pamir Kyrgyz dialect
- Kyrgyz cuisine
- Sart Kalmyks
