= Karimov =

Karimov or Carimoff is a slavicised version of the name Karim. Its feminine counterpart is Karimova. It is most popular in Central Asia, especially in Uzbekistan, although it is prevalent in the South Caucasus. Notable people with the surname include:

- Abdurahmon Karimov, Tajikistani politician
- Ali Karimov (1919–2000), Azerbaijani statesman
- Aliya Karimova (born 1978), Kazakhstani synchronized swimmer
- Ayrat Karimov (1971–2020), Russian footballer in the Soviet First League from 1987
- Behruz Karimov (born 2007), Uzbekistani footballer
- Elvina Karimova (born 1994), Russian female water polo player
- Ergash Karimov (1935–2009), Uzbek comedian and comic actor
- Evgeniya Karimova (born 1989), Uzbekistani taekwondo practitioner
- Flora Karimova (born 1941), Azerbaijani pop music singer, civil rights activist
- Gulnara Karimova (born 1972), the elder daughter of Islam Karimov, the leader of Uzbekistan from 1989 to his death in 2016
- Gulouchen Karimova (born 1979), Azerbaijani female volleyball player
- Hayrulla Karimov (born 1978), international footballer who plays for PFC Kuruvchi
- Islam Karimov (1938–2016), first President of Uzbekistan, from 1990 to 2016
- Jamshid Karimov (born 1967), Uzbek journalist
- Jurabek Karimov (born 1998), Uzbekistani tennis player
- Latif Karimov (1906–1991), Azerbaijani carpet designer
- Lola Karimova-Tillyaeva (born 1978), Uzbek diplomat and philanthropist
- Natalya Karimova (born 1974), Russian cyclist
- Saima Karimova (1926–2013), Russian geologist
- Samara Karimova (born 1991), Kyrgyz pop singer
- Tatyana Karimova (born 1948), First Lady of Uzbekistan from 1991 until 2016; widow of former President Islam Karimov
- Yulia Karimova (born 1994), Russian sport shooter

== See also ==
- Kerimov
