= Without Fear (disambiguation) =

"Without Fear" is a series of comic books featuring the superhero Daredevil.

Without Fear may also refer to:

- Without Fear (album), a 2019 album by Dermot Kennedy
- Without Fear (film), 1971 Soviet film
- "Without Fear", a song by Lacuna Coil from the 2006 album Karmacode
