= Bakhtiyor Ikhtiyarov =

Soviet and Uzbek actor (1940–2021)

Bakhtiyor Akhmedovich Ikhtiyarov (Uzbek: Baxtiyor Ixtiyorov / Бахтиёр Ихтиёров, Russian: Бахтиёр Ахмедович Ихтияров; 28 March 1940 – 21 November 2021) was a Soviet and Uzbek actor.

== Career ==
Ikhtiyarov was born in Bukhara. He started his career as a theatre actor, but in 1964 he starred in Ali Hamroyev's Yor-yor, one of the most successful Uzbek comedies of all time. Following that, he became a well-known actor and regularly appeared in many movies from 1964 on. In 1989, he was given the title People's Artist of the Uzbek SSR.

== Personal life ==
He was married to the actress, People's Artist of Uzbekistan Mariam Ikhtiyarovа (nee Ruzmetova, born in 1939).

Ikhtiyarov died on 21 November 2021 in Tashkent.

== Filmography ==
- 1964: Yor-yor as Bakhtiar
- 1969: Oʻtgan kunlar as puppeteer
- 1972: The Seventh Bullet as Sagdulla
- 1977: The Mischievous Boy as crazy man
- 1983: Hot Summer in Kabul as Jamali
- 1991: Shikari: The Hunter as Bakhtiar-aka
