= Kerimov =

Kerimov is a surname. The female form is Kerimova. Notable people with the surname include:

- Aslan Kerimov (born 1973), Azerbaijani footballer
- Bakhargul Kerimova, Turkmenistani writer
- Elnara Kerimova (born 1962), Azerbaijani and Turkish conductor and chorus master
- Flora Kerimova (born 1941), Azerbaijani pop music singer, civil rights activist
- Gulouchen Kerimova (born 1979), Azerbaijani female volleyball player
- Kenan Kerimov (born 1976), Azerbaijani footballer and football manager and former player
- Kerim Kerimov (1917–2003) Soviet Azerbaijani engineer, regarded as one of the key scientists and founders in the Soviet Union's space program
- Ramiz Kerimov (born 1981), Azerbaijani footballer
- Suleyman Kerimov (born 1966), Russian billionaire businessman, philanthropist and politician of Lezgian origin, Russian politician and businessman

== See also ==
- Karimov
