= The Return of the King (disambiguation) =

The Return of the King is the third volume of J. R. R. Tolkien's fantasy novel The Lord of the Rings as originally printed.

The Return of the King may also refer to:

== Media related to Tolkien's novel ==
- The Return of the King (1980 film), a 1980 animated adaptation of Tolkien's novel distributed by Rankin/Bass
- The Lord of the Rings: The Return of the King, a 2003 live-action film directed by Peter Jackson
  - The Lord of the Rings: The Return of the King (video game), a video game adaptation of the 2003 film by Electronic Arts

== Television ==
- "Return of the King" (Brooklyn Nine-Nine), an episode of the sixth season of Brooklyn Nine-Nine
- "Return of the King" (Entourage), an episode of Entourage
- "Return of the King" (The Boondocks), an episode of The Boondocks
- "The Return of the King" (Robin Hood), an episode of Robin Hood
- King of Boys: The Return of the King, a Netflix original series

== Other uses ==
- "Return of the King" (comics), a 2009 Daredevil story arc
- Return of the King (Eldee album), 2006
- Return of the King: LeBron James, the Cleveland Cavaliers, and the Greatest Comeback in NBA History, a 2017 book by Brian Windhorst and Dave McMenamin

== See also ==
- Return of a King, history book by William Dalrymple
- Return of Kings, a manosphere blog by Daryush Valizadeh
