= Without Fear (film) =

- Без Cтраха
- Directed by: Ali Khamraev
- Written by: Ali Khamraev
- Starring: Diloram Kambarova; Rustam Sagdullaev
- Music by: Rumil Vildanov
- Production company: Uzbekfilm
- Release date: 1971
- Running time: 96
- Countries: USSR, Uzbek SSR
- Language: Russian

Without Fear (Russian Без страха) is a Soviet film made in 1971 by Ali Khamraev (Russian: Али Хамраев) with the production company Uzbekfilm (Russian: Узбекфильм). The film is set in the late 1920s in the Uzbek Soviet Socialist Republic. Khamraev was the director for The Seventh Bullet (Russian: Седьмая пуля) which is also set in Soviet central Asia in the 1920s. The film explores themes about Islam, Communism, and Islamic veiling.

== Plot ==
The film, set in 1929, centres on a Red Army commissar (Rustam Sagdullaev) tasked with bringing "modernisation" to a rural Kishlak in the Uzbek S.S.R. He meets a defiant fourteen year old girl played by Dilorom Kambarova, who becomes the fist in her village to remove her paranja, burning it in public, in a ceremony attended by the commissar. This is in direct contrast to Gulsara, the commisar's wife, who refuses to remove her paranja, saying “Paranja does not bother anyone, it’s possible to work and study and raise children wearing it.”

Many in the village oppose this, such as the local mullahs and the commisar's father-in-law. This creates the central conflict of the film: the conflict between those who do and do not support unveiling, and the chaos and violence caused by it.
