= Ergash Karimov =

Comedian

Ergash Karimov Эргаш Каримов
- Born: Ergash Karimovich Karimov; October 26, 1935
- Died: August 4, 2009 (aged 73); Tashkent, Uzbekistan
- Occupations: actor and theater director
- Spouse: Rozaxon Karimova
- Awards: People's Artist of the Uzbek SSR (1990); Order of People's Honor (1999)

Ergash Karimov (Uzbek: Ergash Karimov, Эргаш Каримов; Russian: Эргаш Каримов; (Note: Sometimes spelled Irgash Karimov (Cyrillic: Иргаш Каримов).) October 26, 1935 – August 4, 2009) was an Uzbek stage actor who received critical acclaim for his roles in theater, film, and television. Karimov is best known for his roles in the 1972 Uzbek sketch comedy Uchrashuv.

Karimov was nicknamed the King of Uzbek Comedy during his long career in the Soviet Union. Scenes from some of his films during the 1970s are considered to be classics within Uzbek and Soviet comedy. Karimov received many honorary titles and awards, including the title People's Artist of the Uzbek SSR (1990) and the Order of People's Honor (1999).

== Life and work ==
Ergash Karimovich Karimov was born on October 26, 1935. He graduated from the Tashkent Institute of Arts in 1958. That same year he started working at the Surkhandarya Theater. Later he worked as assistant director, director, and creative director at the Yoshlik TV Studio of the Uzbekistan Broadcasting Company. Karimov was married to actress Rozaxon Karimova.

Karimov is best known for his roles in the 1972 Uzbek sketch comedy Uchrashuv. In one of the segments of the film, Karimov portrays a naive chemistry student who is not able to decipher the chemical formula for water. Karimov's character concludes that there are no atoms in water, as they could be used to create a bomb. Karimov is also known for his portrayal of a dishonest religious man in the highly acclaimed Uzbek adventure film Shum bola.

Karimov remained largely unemployed after Uzbekistan became independent following the break-up of the Soviet Union. He lived in Tashkent with little income during the last few years of his life, according to Uzbek film director and producer Ali Hamroyev. Karimov died on August 4, 2009, at his home in Tashkent at the age of 73. He was no relation to Islam Karimov, the current President of Uzbekistan. Uzbekistan's state controlled media, which is heavily censored, did not report on Karimov's death.

== Filmography ==
- Круг (Circle) (1966)
- Без страха (Fearless) (1971)
- Uchrashuv (Russian: Встреча) (The Meeting) (1972)
- Yettinchi oʻq (Russian: Седьмая пуля) (The Seventh Bullet) (1972)
- Abu Rayhon Beruniy (Russian: Абу Райхан Беруни) (Abū Rayḥān Bīrūnī) (1974)
- Седьмой джинн (The Seventh Genie) (1976)
- Shum Bola (Russian: Озорник) (The Mischievous Boy) (1977)
- Ленинградцы, дети мои... (The People of Leningrad, My Children...) (1980)
- Наедине (In Private) (1984)
- Vuodillik kelin (Russian: Невеста из Вуадиля) (A Bride from Vuodil) (1984)
- Qabrdan qaytgan umr (Russian: Жизнь после смерти) (Life After Death) (2010)

== Awards ==
Karimov received many honorary titles and awards throughout his career, including the title People's Artist of the Uzbek SSR in 1990. In 1999, he received the Order of People's Honor.
