= Qurbān-ʻAlī Khālidī =

Kazakh historian (1846–1913)

Qurbān-ʻAlī Khālidī (Kazakh: Халиди Құрбанғали, Halidi Qūrbanğali; Russian: Курбангали Халиди, 1846–1913) was a Kazakh historian, focusing mainly on the history of the eastern Kazakh steppe. His works are important sources for the history of Kazakhstan and Xinjiang.

Khālidī was born in Ayagoz, Kazakhstan, to a Chala Kazakh family, though he referred to himself as a "Noghay" - a Volga-Ural Muslim, or Tartar, as his father was a native of the Kazan area. His mother was a native of Ayagoz. He studied in several madrasas, first in his hometown of Ayagoz, then in Semipalatinsk, Lepsi, and Bukhara. By 1871 he attained the rank of imam, and by 1874 was the imam of a mosque in Tacheng.

Khālidī's writings utilize several Turkic languages, including Tatar, Ottoman Turkish, Chagatai, and vernacular Kazakh. As such, studying and translating his works can be difficult for even experienced scholars.

== Published works ==
- Tārīkh-i jarīda-yi jadīda, (New Historical Records). Kazan, 1889.
- Tawārīkh-i khamsa-yi sharqī (Essays on the History of Five Eastern Peoples). Kazan, 1910. Now republished in abridged and modernized form in Kazakh as Tauarikh khamsa: bes tarikh by Kūrbanghali Khalid.
- An Islamic Biographical Dictionary of the Eastern Kazakh Steppe, 1770-1912. Brill's Inner Asian library, v. 12. Leiden: Brill, 2004.
- Materials for the Islamic history of Semipalatinsk: two manuscripts by Aḥmad-Walī al-Qazā and Qurbānʻali Khālidī. Berlin: Das Arabische Buch, 2001.
