= Damir Salimov =

Uzbek film director (1937–2019)

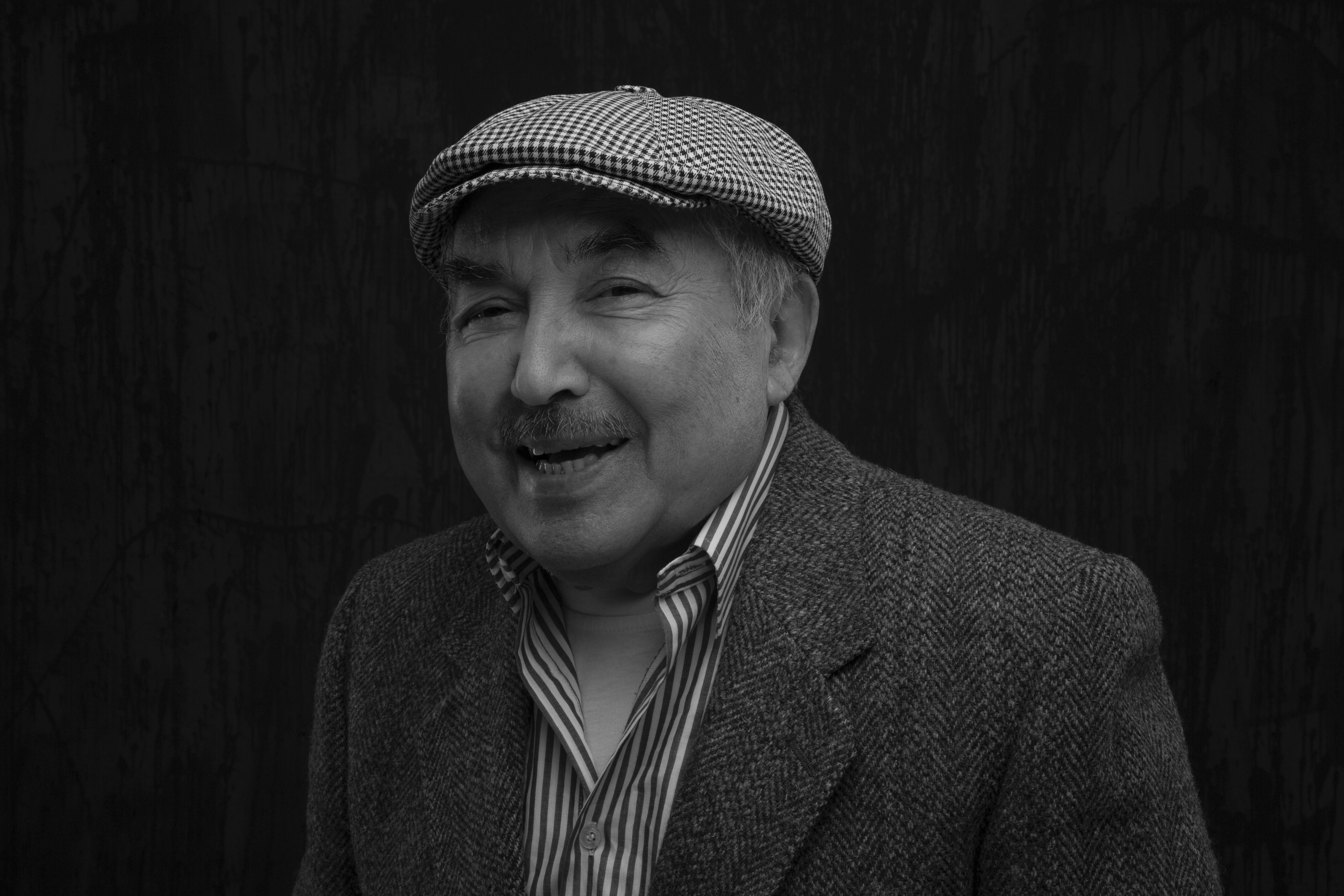
- Salimov in 2017
- Born: 19 July 1937; Tashkent, Uzbekistan
- Died: 28 March 2019 (aged 81)
- Education: All-Union State Institute of Cinematography
- Occupation: Film director
- Known for: Introducing animation to Uzbekistan

Damir Salimov (Russian: Дамир Салимов; 19 July 1937 – 28 March 2019) was an Uzbek film director who was credited with introducing animation to Uzbekistan in 1965, when he directed and produced the animated puppet film В квадрате 6х6. He was also a prominent figure in the development of hand-drawn animation in Uzbekistan in the 1970s. He was awarded the State Hamza Prize in 1983 for his work.

Salimov studied at State Institute of Cinematography (VGIK).

== Filmography ==
- 1972: Gory zovut
- 1977: The Mischievous Boy
- 1980: Leningradtsy, deti moi...
- 1987: Smysl zhizni
