= The Mischievous Boy =

1977 Uzbek adventure film

- Film's poster in Uzbek
- Directed by: Damir Salimov
- Written by: Shuhrat Abbosov; Aleksandr Naumov
- Starring: Abduraim Abduvahobov; Saidkarim Saidoripov; Hamza Umarov; Vohid Qodirov; Abdulxayr Qosimov; Baxtiyor Ixtiyorov; Sa’dixon Tabibullayev; Ergash Karimov
- Music by: Rumil Vildanov
- Production company: Uzbekfilm
- Release date: 1977
- Running time: 95 minutes
- Countries: Uzbek SSR, USSR
- Languages: Uzbek, Russian

The Mischievous Boy (Uzbek: Shum bola, Шум бола; Russian: Озорник, romanized: Ozornik) is a 1977 Soviet-Uzbek adventure comedy-drama film based on an eponymous story by Gʻafur Gʻulom. The film was directed by Damir Salimov and the screenplay was written by Shuhrat Abbosov and Aleksandr Naumov (II). Shum bola is one of the most popular Uzbek films and has gained considerable acclaim both from Uzbek and foreign film critics. The film stars Abduraim Abduvahobov as Qoravoy, a ten-year-old boy whose restless nature leads him to deal with different people and life situations.

== Plot ==
Tashkent, summer of 1916. Teenage Qoravoy lives with his widowed mother and sisters. Right after being scolded for some mischief he is caught with another — sneaking out eggs and lard to organize "pooling for pilaf". Qoravoy hides from his mother and elder sister in an abandoned house, but finds a gang of Sultan the thief there. Sultan chases him with a knife and the boy runs away from the city.

In a town Qoravoy reaches by night a local man lets him stay in his barn on the condition that if the sick bull starts to die, the boy calls the owner and helps butcher it. Qoravoy manages to kill the bull on his own, but in the morning finds he mistakenly killed a donkey.

The peasant chases Qoravoy over the rooftops. Qoravoy falls down a chimney and gets stuck in a tandoor oven. Next evening he sees a merchant's wife partying with her lover. Qoravoy blackmails them to get some food and money, then leaves.

Qoravoy spends the night at a marketplace. In the morning a lynch mob accuses him of partaking in a theft. Scared Qoravoy confesses every crime possible and impossible, including murdering the man who is beating him right now. The crowd laughs and lets him go.

Qoravoy applies for work in an apple orchard, but warns the bai (landowner) that he lies often. The bai enjoys taunting his workers and beats them when that gets boring. As a result, when the workers need to report the news from the estate to him, no one wishes to go, and Qoravoy volunteers. But instead of the news, he tells a story similar to The Servant Maimundus: servants broke an expensive knife, when they were skinning bai's prized hound, who died from overeating meat of the bai's prized horse, who was worked to death carrying water to extinguish his house, which caught fire from a candle, which was lit over the corpse of his infant son, who fell from a tree. In the end Qoravoy is kicked out and paid with rotten apples.

Qoravoy sells the apples at a marketplace and meets his friend Aman, who now works as a sheep herder and invites Qoravoy to join too. Then the friends witness an unusual scene: the thief Sultan accuses a peasant of stealing his purse. Then Sultan forces the boys to testify in his favor.

In the next scene Sultan is partying with his gang and boasts how on a bet he stole a purse, put his ring inside, returned the purse, called police, made them arrest the victim, then felt so generous, he bribed the police to let the peasant go. When Qoravoy tries to leave, Sultan stops him, telling that now he cannot leave the gang. But then the gang starts beating a quack-doctor (who keeps calling himself "Domla" — a medrese teacher) and the boys slip away. Aman blames Qoravoy for his misfortunes and they part their ways.

Qoravoy returns to Tashkent. There he helps an old man to carry a sack of bread. The old man — Khadzhi Bobo — runs a cannabis den. He hires Qoravoy to work for food and tips. Qoravoy starts making a lot of money, he enjoys talking to the clients — mainly, well-educated people, although far down the slippery slope. But he misses his family. Realizing, he won't be allowed to leave, he provokes Khadzhi Bobo to fire him.

After all the misadventures Qoravoy returns home rich. But it's too late, his mother has recently died.

=== Differences from the book ===
A number of episodes did not make it to the film. This includes Qoravoy's life with his uncle right after leaving home; life with dervishes; most events involving Aman: herding sheep, helping "Domla" with ablution of a corpse, guarding a cow, butchering said cow, and Aman trying to betray Qoravoy. The book has a happy ending — Qoravoy's mother is alive and well when he returns, while the film reflects more of Gʻafur Gʻulom's biography.

More importantly, the film lacks the protagonist's internal monologues and cultural notes. This hinders understanding for viewers unfamiliar with culture of pre-Soviet Central Asia. The scene around the tandoor seems to last only several minutes, but starts at dawn and ends at night — in the book Qoravoy tells he got stuck inside. Aman's accusations feel unreasonable — but in the book he's been suffering from Qoravoy's pranks and many weeks of misfortunes, losing every job. It is unclear how and why Qoravoy makes a chillim explode — in the book he put a small flask of water in the coals to provoke Hoji Bobo to fire him.
