= Kingpin (character) =

Marvel Comics supervillain

- Kingpin as depicted in Invincible Iron Man #9 (August 2023). Art by Juan Frigeri.

Publication information
- Publisher: Marvel Comics
- First appearance: The Amazing Spider-Man #50 (July 1967)
- Created by: Stan Lee (writer); John Romita Sr. (artist)

In-story information
- Full name: Wilson Grant Fisk
- Place of origin: New York City
- Team affiliations: Hydra; The Hand; Emissaries of Evil; Thunderbolts; Sinister Six
- Partnerships: Vanessa Fisk (first wife); Typhoid Mary Fisk (second wife); Butch Pharris (son; successor)
- Notable aliases: Kingpin
- Abilities: Criminal mastermind; Peak human strength and durability; Skilled hand-to-hand combatant; Utilizes weaponized cane that shoots lasers and releases sleeping gas

The Kingpin is a supervillain appearing in American comic books published by Marvel Comics. The character was created by Stan Lee and John Romita Sr. and first appeared in The Amazing Spider-Man #50 (cover dated July 1967). Introduced as an adversary of Spider-Man, he later became the primary antagonist of Daredevil under Frank Miller, beginning in 1981, and is regarded as one of that character's two archenemies, alongside Bullseye.

Kingpin is the persona of Wilson Fisk, who presents himself publicly as a businessman and philanthropist while running New York City's criminal underworld from behind that cover. He has no superpowers. Most of his bulk is muscle rather than fat, and he has trained in unarmed combat disciplines—including sumo wrestling—that allow him to overwhelm opponents as powerful as Spider-Man. A network of lawyers, charitable donations, and carefully managed public appearances has allowed him to operate while law enforcement agencies, from the New York City Police Department to the Federal Bureau of Investigation, have tracked him for years without producing a successful prosecution. He is the father of Richard Fisk and the former guardian of Maya Lopez. He was married first to Vanessa Fisk and later to Typhoid Mary.

Kingpin has been part of defining Daredevil and Spider-Man stories, including "Born Again", the story arc most associated with the character's maturation into Daredevil's defining villain. In it, Karen Page sold Daredevil's secret identity to Fisk's organization, and Fisk responded by using political and legal contacts to disbar Matt Murdock, freeze his assets, and destroy his apartment before Murdock eventually recovered and exposed Fisk's criminal network. Other major storylines involving Fisk include the "Gang War" arc, in The Amazing Spider-Man following "Born Again"; the "Last Rites" arc, which culminated in "The Fall of the Kingpin" in Daredevil #300; and the "Back in Black" arc, in which Spider-Man tracked him through the criminal underworld after a Fisk-ordered sniper attack left Aunt May hospitalized. One of his largest arcs saw him elected as mayor of New York City on an anti-vigilante platform, subsequently outlawing superhero activity, before losing office during the "Devil's Reign" event. While his primary enemies are Daredevil and Spider-Man, Fisk has also come into conflict with the Punisher, Echo, and street-level heroes including Luke Cage, Iron Fist, and Jessica Jones. There are even instances where he comes into conflict with the Avengers as a whole, specifically Captain America.

Kingpin has been listed as one of Marvel's most notable villains. The character has been adapted across film, television, and video games. John Rhys-Davies portrayed Wilson Fisk in the television film The Trial of the Incredible Hulk (1989), and Michael Clarke Duncan played the character in the 2003 feature film Daredevil, gaining forty pounds for the role. Liev Schreiber voiced the character in the animated film Spider-Man: Into the Spider-Verse (2018). Vincent D'Onofrio has portrayed the character in the Marvel Cinematic Universe across Daredevil (2015–2018), Hawkeye (2021), Echo (2024), and Daredevil: Born Again (2025–present).

== Publication history ==
=== Creation ===
Stan Lee developed the initial concept for Kingpin. Lee wanted someone who ran organized crime the way a chairman ran a conglomerate; a figure whose removal from power would leave visible damage on the city around him. He brought the concept to artist John Romita Sr., and Wilson Fisk debuted in The Amazing Spider-Man #50 (July 1967), during the "Spider-Man No More!" story arc in which Peter Parker had quit being Spider-Man.

Romita modeled Fisk's build on actors Sydney Greenstreet and Robert Middleton. The narrative claims that his bulk is not fat, but muscle. The character's name came from the Mafia slang for a crime lord. His early stories gave him a set of gadgets, such as a cane that could fire a ray blast and a tie-pin that emitted sleeping gas. Comics scholar Paul Young described the very first appearance of Kingpin as a "monstrously obese bald man wearing a white tux jacket, a diamond-studded ascot, and purple pants." Frank Miller described the initial version of the character as the "Jackie Gleason of supervillains". Lee's dialogue for the character employs a "quasi-Elizabethan dialect", typical among villains of the decade. Young said that the character recalls the depictions of corrupt millionaires in political cartoons of the Great Depression.

=== Early years ===
Lee and Romita continued with Fisk across three consecutive issues in the summer of 1967. Issue #51 (August 1967) gave the character his first extended encounter with Spider-Man and introduced Frederick Foswell – a Daily Bugle reporter previously known as the criminal Patch – who had abandoned his reformed life to work for Fisk. Foswell died in issue #52 (September 1967), taking a bullet intended for J. Jonah Jameson.

Over the next two years, Lee developed Fisk's supporting world. In The Amazing Spider-Man #61 (June 1968), with layouts by Romita and pencils by Don Heck, Fisk used a brainwashing scheme to turn Captain George Stacy against Spider-Man, which complicated Peter Parker's relationship with Gwen Stacy. Issues #68–70 (January–March 1969) centered on a petrified tablet said to grant special powers, with a subplot involving student protests at Empire State University. In issue #70 (March 1969), after Fisk escaped prison by unscrewing his cell bars with his bare hands, a silhouetted figure drove him away from Spider-Man and the police. Lee deliberately withheld the identity of this person for several issues before revealing her as Vanessa Fisk, Wilson's wife.

Lee and Romita closed out their run with the character in The Amazing Spider-Man #83–85 (April–June 1970). A rival crime lord, the Schemer, was unmasked as Richard Fisk, Wilson's son, who had faked his death in a skiing accident to return to New York City and destroy his father's empire from within. The revelation put Wilson into a comatose state. Romita modeled Vanessa's face, first shown clearly in issue #83, on the Dragon Lady from Milton Caniff's Terry and the Pirates. Lee's stated intent was to build a contradicting quality into the character: a man capable of ordering murders who was also a devoted husband. Eventually, Vanessa is rendered comatose, and Kingpin sobs over her body.

The character then dropped out of the Spider-Man books for several years. He reappeared in Captain America #148 (April 1972) in a story involving Richard Fisk's near-death, then more substantially in The Amazing Spider-Man #164 (January 1977), where writer Len Wein and artist Ross Andru built a story around a life-force transfer device. The Kingpin had kidnapped Spider-Man and was using the machine to try to save the dying Richard; the arc ended with Wilson's apparent death. Writer Marv Wolfman returned to the character in The Amazing Spider-Man #196–198 (September–November 1979), with art by Al Milgrom, Jim Mooney, and Frank Giacoia. That storyline revealed that Wilson had been living with amnesia following the earlier encounter. He recovered his memory after nearly being run down by Silvermane's car, whereupon Vanessa gave him twenty-four hours to reform before she left him.

During the early 1980s, writer Bill Mantlo used Kingpin across several issues of Peter Parker, the Spectacular Spider-Man. Issue #67 (June 1982), penciled by Edward Hannigan, introduced the assassin Boomerang as an applicant for Fisk's employ, with the Kingpin agreeing to hire him only if Boomerang brought Spider-Man's corpse as a credential. Issue #81 (August 1983), penciled by Al Milgrom, depicted the Punisher, Cloak, and Dagger each independently pursuing the Kingpin after the Punisher escaped from Dannemora State Prison.

=== 1980s and 1990s ===
Frank Miller had been living in Hell's Kitchen when he took over Daredevil, and had been mugged at knifepoint in the neighborhood. The crime around him fed directly into his approach to the book. The colorful villains who had populated Daredevil in the 1960s and 1970s were set aside; in their place, Miller borrowed the Kingpin from Spider-Man's books. Beginning with Daredevil #170 (May 1981), Wilson became Daredevil's primary adversary. Miller reinvented the character as a film noir-inspired ganglord. Paul Young compares the character to the characters of Whit Sterling in Out of the Past and Kasper Gutman in The Maltese Falcon. He discarded the character's gadgets and rebuilt him as the employer of hired killers, who bribes officials and maintains enough distance from his crimes to avoid prosecution. In Miller's characterization, Kingpin's dominance is largely strategic; he is often absent from the narrative, but pulls the strings of other characters. He illustrates the character largely by means of lighting effects, drawing from a suggestion by John Byrne. Comics writer Alan Moore credits the final pages of Daredevil #170 as effectively transforming the character, "from the podgy, pompous buffoon" of early stories "into a man who has buried his humanity under a mountain of iron resolve as vast as his physical body."

Daredevil #174 introduced the Hand, a league of ninja assassins with origins in feudal Japan, as operatives the Kingpin had hired to kill Matt Murdock, the real identity of Daredevil. Elektra, working as Wilson's enforcer and also Murdock's former lover, nearly killed investigative reporter Ben Urich when Urich's reporting began closing in on the Kingpin's operations. In issue #180, the Kingpin makes a deal with Murdock to eliminate a rival gang in return for information about the Hand's location. This has the consequence of rendering the two characters as potential allies, pragmatically, despite their opposing moral perspectives.

Writer and artist Al Milgrom reintroduced Wilson to the Spider-Man books in a story arc in Peter Parker, the Spectacular Spider-Man, beginning with issue #98 (January 1985), penciled by Herb Trimpe, and concluding in issue #100 (March 1985). Issue #98 revealed that the Kingpin had secretly given Black Cat enhanced "bad luck" powers, which she had hidden from Spider-Man. A subplot in the same issue followed Jonathan Ohnn, a scientist in Wilson's employ attempting to replicate Cloak and Dagger's abilities; an experiment went wrong and transformed Ohnn into the supervillain Spot. Issue #100 wrapped up both threads, with Spider-Man ending his relationship with Black Cat after learning what the Kingpin had arranged.

"Born Again", published in Daredevil #227–233 (February–August 1986) and drawn by David Mazzucchelli, drew on five years of Miller's groundwork. Karen Page – Murdock's former girlfriend, now a heroin addict working in pornographic films in Mexico – sold Daredevil's secret identity to someone in the Kingpin's employ in exchange for a drug fix. Wilson's response had the Internal Revenue Service freeze Murdock's accounts, arranged for a corrupt police officer to perjure himself and get Murdock disbarred, and eventually had Murdock's apartment firebombed and Murdock drugged and driven into the East River. Murdock survived, recovered in a Hell's Kitchen church, and eventually exposed Wilson's criminal network publicly, ending the businessman image Wilson had maintained for years.

Tom DeFalco and Ron Frenz wrote a tie-in in The Amazing Spider-Man #277 (June 1986), depicting Peter Parker visiting Murdock, who is reduced to his lowest state by the Kingpin's campaign. DeFalco and Frenz then wrote the five-part "Gang War" arc in The Amazing Spider-Man #284–288 (January–May 1987), dealing with the vacancy Wilson's removal had left in New York's criminal hierarchy as rival bosses competed to fill it.

Writer D. G. Chichester and artist Lee Weeks returned directly to Miller's setup in Daredevil #297–300 (1992). "The Fall of the Kingpin" removed Wilson's resources one by one across several issues, beginning with Typhoid Mary taken from him, his Hydra connections turned against him, his home destroyed, until the title's anniversary issue #300 left Wilson a homeless vagrant. Writer Danny Fingeroth and artists Al Milgrom and Kerry Gammill used the character differently in the four-issue Deadly Foes of Spider-Man miniseries (May–August 1991), keeping Wilson entirely offstage as a manipulator: he freed the Beetle from prison, watched the resulting gang activity create chaos, and claimed the proceeds from the villains' bank heist for himself at the story's conclusion.

=== 2000s ===
A Brian Michael Bendis and Mark Bagley arc in Ultimate Spider-Man built a gang war between Wilson and Hammerhead around the introduction of Ultimate versions of Iron Fist and Shang-Chi. The story ended with Wilson's victory and the disclosure that detective Jean DeWolff had been working for him the whole time.

A four-issue Kingpin miniseries, written by Bruce Jones with art by Sean Phillips and Klaus Janson, covered Wilson's rise from street violence to crime boss, filling in years that Lee and Romita's original 1967 stories had skipped entirely. The series depicted Wilson's first murder at twelve, his teenage gang, his entry into Don Rigoletto's organization, and the steps by which he took it over.

Brian Michael Bendis and artist Alex Maleev's run on Daredevil (issues #41–81, 2002–2006) opened with Wilson already imprisoned, with his absence triggering a turf war among the criminal organizations, ninja groups, and supervillains who could not agree on a successor. Bendis eventually had Murdock walk into a room of criminals and declare himself the new Kingpin, which was aimed at collapsing the vacancy rather than filling it.

The Civil War event produced the one-shot War Crimes, in which Wilson offered Iron Man the location of Captain America's resistance base in exchange for reduced prison time. He then turned on Iron Man when the arrangement threatened his standing among fellow inmates. After Spider-Man publicly revealed his identity under the Superhero Registration Act, Wilson ordered a sniper to kill him from his cell, but the bullet hit Aunt May. Writer J. Michael Straczynski and artist Ron Garney wrote the five-issue "Back in Black" arc in The Amazing Spider-Man #538–542 (2007), following Peter Parker as he put on his black costume and worked through the criminal underworld until he reached Wilson in prison. In the 2009 arc "Return of the King", written by Ed Brubaker with art by Michael Lark and David Aja across Daredevil vol. 2 #116–119 and #500, Wilson returned to the United States and briefly aligned with Daredevil in Brubaker's final story arc on the title.

=== 2010s ===
In 2010, writer Jason Aaron and artist Steve Dillon launched PunisherMAX, a new arc under Marvel's MAX imprint that reimagined Wilson's origin outside the main continuity. The first arc depicted Wilson as a mob bodyguard who becomes the Kingpin, while the Punisher, who was initially used as a distraction, becomes an obstacle Wilson cannot remove.

The 2017 Secret Empire event gave Wilson the basis for a political career. During Hydra's occupation of Manhattan, Blackout sealed the island off with a Darkforce field. Wilson moved into a church sheltering civilians, killed the gang leader threatening them, and distributed medicine to those present, telling them to remember who had protected them when the crisis ended. When the occupation collapsed, Wilson waited until Daredevil had left the country before announcing a last-minute independent mayoral candidacy. He ran on an anti-vigilante platform, capitalizing on the legal precedent Daredevil had recently established for heroes to testify in court without revealing their identities, which Wilson had fought and lost.

Writer Charles Soule handled the mayoral arc in Daredevil #595–605 (2017–2018) with art principally by Stefano Landini. Wilson won the election; it later emerged he had also fixed it. As mayor, he outlawed vigilante activity and offered Murdock the deputy mayor position, thinking that Murdock's presence might reassure the half of the city that distrusted him. Murdock accepted to monitor Wilson from close range. In issue #600, drawn by Ron Garney, the Hand launched an attack over Blindspot's refusal to join them. Wilson was struck by dozens of arrows, leaving him in a coma. Murdock operated as acting mayor and directed the superhero community in repelling the Hand. When Wilson recovered, Murdock returned the office only after Wilson agreed to end his anti-vigilante campaign.

=== 2020s ===
Writer Chip Zdarsky and artist Marco Checchetto drove the Devil's Reign crossover (2021–2022) to a conclusion in which Wilson, having used Purple Man's powers to try to recover his erased memories of Daredevil's identity, attacked who he believed was Matt Murdock. The man was Mike Murdock, a twin brother conjured into existence by an Inhuman, and Wilson killed him. Luke Cage won the subsequent mayoral election in a landslide. Freed from custody by his illegitimate son Byron "Butch" Pharris, Wilson passed the Kingpin title to Pharris, declined an offer from financial backers to run for president, and left New York with Typhoid Mary. The Zdarsky run had also traced a parallel failure during the mayoral period itself. Wilson approached the Stromwyns, a pair of billionaire siblings, seeking a genuine business partnership, and was admitted as a spectacle rather than an equal. When they offered to install him as a puppet president, he broke one Stromwyn's hand rather than accept it.

After leaving New York, Wilson and Mary got married; Mary's status as a mutant allowed the two to claim citizenship on the mutant nation of Krakoa. When Orchis dismantled Krakoa's population, Emma Frost installed Wilson as the White King of the Hellfire Club in Immortal X-Men #14, putting the island's financial assets under his control as part of the mutants' counter-campaign against Orchis. Wilson's return to New York was depicted in writer Zeb Wells's "Gang War" storyline, in which he arrived during a gang war among the city's crime families with Mary and a contingent of Hellfire Club enforcers. In Giant-Size Daredevil #1 (2025), written by Saladin Ahmed with art by Paul Davidson, Wilson was possessed by a demon of Greed – one of the supernatural entities running through Ahmed's Daredevil run – stalking New York at night in an attempt to draw Murdock out, with the story ending on Wilson not wanting Murdock's death but to save his soul.

== Characterization ==
=== Fictional character biography ===
Wilson Fisk grew up poor in New York City as a descendant of Anatoly Fyskov, a Russian immigrant. He was overweight and bullied throughout childhood. He trained himself in physical combat and at age 15, and used his massive size to organize a gang consisting of his former tormentors. He caught the attention of mob boss Don Rigoletto, who hired him as a bodyguard. Fisk subsequently rose through the ranks of the organization, killed Rigoletto, and absorbed his operations. He expanded from there until he controlled New York's criminal underworld, fighting off challenges from the Maggia and Hydra along the way. To insulate himself from prosecution, he built a public image as a businessman and philanthropist. He married a woman named Vanessa, who did not know what he did when they wed, and they had a son, Richard. When Vanessa eventually learned the truth, she gave him an ultimatum; Fisk surrendered his empire and relocated his family to Japan; however, unable to abandon his criminal roots, he eventually returned to New York to reclaim it.

Richard, who had not known his father was a criminal until college, faked his own death in a skiing accident and came back to New York in disguise as a rival crime lord called the Schemer, building a gang to tear down his father's empire. Fisk discovered his son's identity and the shock left him catatonic. Fisk acquired Daredevil's secret identity indirectly through Karen Page, Murdock's drug-addicted former girlfriend, and used it to systematically destroy Murdock's professional and civilian life by getting him disbarred, freezing his finances, and eventually firebombing his apartment.

His run of dominance eventually collapsed. Daredevil exposed his criminal network publicly, shattering the legitimate businessman image he had spent years constructing. Fisk adopted Maya Lopez, the daughter of a business partner he had murdered, and directed her against Daredevil by falsely convincing her that the vigilante had killed her father; when she discovered the deception, she shot Fisk in both eyes, blinding him. With Fisk incapacitated, one of his own employees used his vulnerability to stage a coup and seize his empire. Vanessa killed Richard for his role in the betrayal, divided Fisk's remaining assets, and fled the country.

During Hydra's occupation of Manhattan, he protected civilians sheltering in a church, then leveraged the resulting goodwill into a last-minute independent candidacy for mayor of New York City, which he won. It was later revealed to have been fixed. As mayor he outlawed vigilante activity and had several heroes arrested, while offering Murdock the deputy mayor position as a calculated hedge against public opposition. An attack by The Hand left Fisk in a coma. Murdock governed the city in the interim, relinquishing executive power only after Fisk agreed to end his campaign against vigilantes. His mayoral tenure eventually ended when Fisk, attempting to recover his erased memories of Daredevil's identity, killed a man he mistook for Murdock. He was arrested and then freed by his illegitimate son Byron Pharris. Fisk passed the Kingpin title to Pharris, turned down an offer from political backers to run for president, and retired with his second wife, Typhoid Mary.

After getting married, Fisk and Mary claimed citizenship in Krakoa through Mary's status as a mutant. When Orchis forced most of Krakoa's population off Earth, Emma Frost installed Fisk as White King of the Hellfire Club, handing him control of Krakoa's financial infrastructure. He eventually returned to New York, arriving during a gang war among the city's crime families to reassert control alongside Mary and a contingent of Hellfire Club enforcers.

=== Abilities and equipment ===
Kingpin has no superhuman powers, but is significantly stronger and more durable than the average person. He is six feet seven inches tall and weighs 450 pounds, most of which is muscle rather than fat. He has trained in sumo wrestling, granting him peak agility despite his massive frame. His skill is such that he has once fought Captain America to a standstill in hand-to-hand combat. His daily workout typically consists of simultaneously overcoming five or more trained martial artists with his bare hands, and he stores his valuables in a custom-built safe which has no lock, only a door which is so heavy that only the Kingpin himself is strong enough to open it.

Fisk is a capable tactician and organizer who taught himself political science to graduate level, and he runs both legal and criminal operations. He has employed assassins, corrupt officials, scientists, and supervillains, and has manipulated agencies including the New York City Police Department, the Federal Bureau of Investigation, and S.H.I.E.L.D. For years, his charitable donations, his legal team, and the distance he kept from his criminal activity prevented law enforcement from prosecuting him successfully.

He carries a walking stick capable of firing a laser pulse strong enough to disintegrate a handgun; both the cane and his diamond-studded tie are engineered to emit sleeping gas. Other devices he has used include the Vita-Drain, which transfers life force between individuals, and a brainwashing machine designed by the scientist Dr. Gerhard Winkler.

== Reception and legacy ==
The Kingpin's early appearances in The Amazing Spider-Man established him as a credible physical and organizational threat, but the character did not attract sustained critical attention until Frank Miller transplanted him into Daredevil in 1981.

"Born Again" in Daredevil #227–233 (1986) remains the story most closely associated with the character, and is regularly cited as among the best superhero comics published in the 1980s. It has been described as "one of Daredevil's most iconic storylines", with the Kingpin's calculated destruction of Murdock's life representing a departure from how villain-hero conflict had typically been handled in the genre. Authors Paul Chitlik and Jeremy Soles describe "Born Again" as "superhero literature at its finest," arguing that Miller and Mazzucchelli used the Kingpin not to attack Daredevil directly but to dismantle Matt Murdock through "legitimate channels" in a way that had not been done so deliberately before. An academic study applying Lacanian psychoanalytic theory to the arc argues that the Kingpin's campaign against Murdock, and Murdock's inability to permanently resolve it, mirrors the structural condition of serialized narrative itself, and that the characters' recurring inability to feel fulfilled is what sustains both the story and its readership. ComicBook.com contrasts the arc directly with the Green Goblin's discovery of Spider-Man's identity, arguing that where the Goblin struck once and catastrophically, the Kingpin "employed his discovery to orchestrate a calculated campaign of psychological torment – deliberate, methodical, and unrelenting". The mayoral arc in Daredevil #595–605 (2017–2018) also received attention for the novelty of using municipal politics as an extension of Fisk's criminal ambitions. ComicBook.com noted that as mayor, he "transformed parts of the city government into publicly funded extensions of his criminal empire".

The character appears regularly in ranked lists of Marvel's best villains. Marvel's ranking of their greatest supervillains describes him as a figure who has "nearly broken Daredevil on multiple occasions", "dodged every bullet Punisher has ever fired in his direction", and taken punches from Spider-Man "without breaking stride". IGN ranked Kingpin as the 9th greatest Marvel Comics supervillain in 2019, stating that "his money and resources make him untouchable to politicians and law enforcement, while his army of hired thugs and assassins makes it all but impossible to topple his regime". A piece arguing that the Kingpin is Spider-Man's most dangerous enemy contends that his threat is structural rather than personal: "his control over the criminal underworld, his influence in government, and his ability to bend law enforcement to his will meant Spider-Man had to fear not only the Kingpin himself, but also the threats he could orchestrate from the entire city". Eric Diaz of Yahoo! Entertainment noted that the absence of superpowers is central to Fisk's appeal and the character demonstrates that "you don't need superpowers to be a superheroes' main villain. You just need smarts, endless resources, and a shiny bald head".

Vincent D'Onofrio's portrayal of the character in Marvel's Daredevil and subsequent Marvel Cinematic Universe appearances drew widespread attention. An academic study of reaction videos found that D'Onofrio's surprise reveal at the end of the fifth episode of Hawkeye, "Ronin", accounted for half of the most-replayed moments across the miniseries. Academic work on comics remediation has also examined the character's animated version in Spider-Man: Into the Spider-Verse (2018), noting the film's use of comics-specific visual language—onomatopoeia and black-and-white line work—at the moment Kingpin shoots the Prowler as a technique to accentuate the violence within the film's PG rating.

== In other media ==
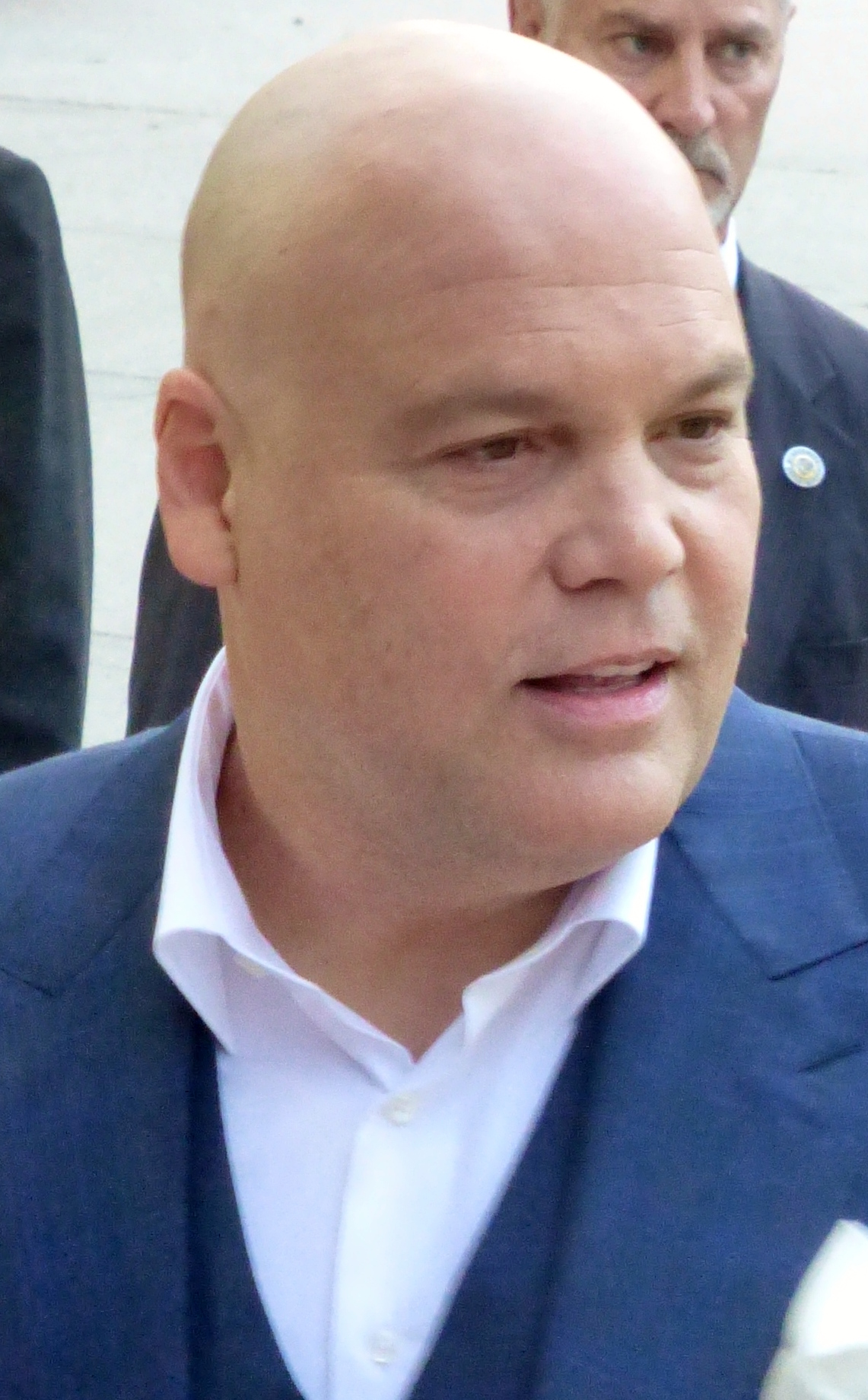
Vincent D'Onofrio portrays Kingpin in the Marvel Cinematic Universe.

The Kingpin has appeared in various media outside comics. On television, Wilson Fisk appeared in The Trial of the Incredible Hulk (1989), portrayed by John Rhys-Davies. He later appeared in the film Daredevil (2003), portrayed by Michael Clarke Duncan. An adaptation of Kingpin appears in the Marvel Cinematic Universe, played by Vincent D'Onofrio as an adult and Cole Jensen as a child. He first appears as one of the antagonists in the series Daredevil (2015–2018) and reprised the role in the miniseries Hawkeye (2021), the miniseries Echo (2024), and the series Daredevil: Born Again (2025–present).

The character was earlier adapted in animated television series, appearing in Spider-Man (1967), where he was voiced by Tom Harvey; Spider-Woman; Spider-Man (1981), where he was voiced by G. Stanley Jones; Spider-Man and His Amazing Friends, where he was voiced by Walker Edmiston; and Spider-Man: The Animated Series, where he was voiced by Roscoe Lee Browne. Michael Clarke Duncan reprised the role of Kingpin, voicing the character in Spider-Man: The New Animated Series. The Kingpin appears as the main antagonist in the animated film Spider-Man: Into the Spider-Verse, voiced by Liev Schreiber.

Kingpin has appeared in a number of video games. Notable examples include: Spider-Man: Battle for New York, voiced by Stephen Stanton; The Punisher (2005), voiced by David Sobolov; Spider-Man 3, voiced by Bob Joles; Spider-Man: Web of Shadows, voiced by Gregg Berger; Marvel Heroes, voiced by Jim Cummings; Lego Marvel Super Heroes, voiced by John DiMaggio; The Amazing Spider-Man 2, voiced by JB Blanc; Insomniac Games' Marvel's Spider-Man series, voiced by Travis Willingham; and Marvel Ultimate Alliance 3: The Black Order, voiced by Tim Blaney.

== See also ==
- Tobias Whale, a similar fictional crime lord and archenemy of Black Lightning in DC Comics.
