= Return of the King (comics) =

2009 Daredevil comic story arc

- Cover to Daredevil (vol. 2) #116. Art by Marko Djurdjevic.
- Publisher: Marvel Comics
- Publication date: April – September 2009
- Genre: Superhero
- Title(s): Daredevil vol. 2, #116-119, 500
- Main character(s): Daredevil; The Kingpin; Lady Bullseye; The Owl

Creative team
- Writer: Ed Brubaker
- Penciller(s): Michael Lark; David Aja
- Inker: Stefano Gaudiano
- Letterer: Chris Eliopoulos
- Editor(s): Alejandro Arbona; Joe Quesada; Warren Simons

"Return of the King" is a 2009 Daredevil story arc written by Ed Brubaker with art by Michael Lark and David Aja and published by Marvel Comics. The story arc appeared in Daredevil vol. 2 #116-119 & 500 (the volume being renumbered) and was Brubaker's final story arc on the character. The story saw Kingpin's return to the United States and team up with Daredevil to take down a common enemy.

== Plot synopsis ==
Wilson Fisk, the Kingpin, flees to Europe to escape a life of crime, where he meets a woman and befriends her children. Fisk starts to see the woman and her children more often, until they are killed by the Hand. Lady Bullseye, one of the Hand's assassins, claims Daredevil sent her. Back in New York City, Daredevil learns that Fisk has returned and allies with him to take down the Hand. Meanwhile, Foggy Nelson learns about Matt's alliance with the Kingpin and convinces Dakota North, to find Matt. Meanwhile, Fisk is talking to Owl and tells him he is ready to betray Daredevil. The next morning, Lady Bullseye is meeting with Owl, when she realizes he is a double agent and convinces him to set up a meeting with Fisk. Dakota manages to find where Fisk and Lady Bullseye are meeting, but is discovered and knocked out by Owl. Daredevil manages to track down Dakota's location, defeat Owl, and rescue her. Meanwhile, Fisk and Lady Bullseye meet with high-ranking members of the Hand. Their meeting is interrupted by Daredevil, who defeats Fisk and Lady Bullseye, and convinces the Hand to recruit him. The story ends with Matt ready to become the new leader of the Hand.

== Reception ==
The arc overall was very well received, receiving scores ranging from 7's to 10's. IGN reviewer Dan Phillips said "The real draw of this over-sized landmark comic is the long awaited conclusion to Ed Brubaker's run on the title, and his finale definitely proves worth the wait. … Brubaker brings his run to an explosive, incredibly captivating conclusion... It's a great read, and arguably the single best Daredevil issue Brubaker has written since his debut arc, 'Devil in Cell Block D.'" Timothy Callahan of Comic Book Resources also praised the book, saying "...but there's little doubt that 'Daredevil' #500 is one of the best Marvel comics of the year. Ed Brubaker has had a strong run on this series, and since the 'Lady Bullseye' arc, and this current 'Return of the King' storyline, his work has been better than ever... This is a fine farewell to Brubaker, Lark, and Gaudiano's 'Daredevil,' and with its jam-packed pages, this is a comic book not to be missed."

== See also ==
- Without Fear
- Shadowland

== Notes ==
- Comic Book DB: Daredevil #116
