= Dinara Akulova =

Kyrgyz singer

- Born: 10 September 1964 (age 61); Svetlaya Polyana, Kyrgyz SSR, Soviet Union
- Genres: Pop
- Occupation(s): musician, songwriter, singer
- Instrument: vocals

Dinara Akulova (Kyrgyz: Динара Акулова; born 10 September 1964) is a Kyrgyzstani singer who is considered the "queen of Kyrgyz pop music".

== Biography ==
Akulova was born on 10 September 1964 in Svetlaya Polyana. After her parents divorced, she lived with her grandmother. Akulova herself first attended a music school in Karakol. Afterwards she studied at the State Art Institute in Bishkek. She is currently one of the most famous singers in Kyrgyzstan and is a recipient of the honorary title "Honored Artist of the Kyrgyz Republic".

Akulova has three daughters and one adopted son, one of whom is her youngest daughter Malika Dina who also became a singer. Malika Dina gave birth to a daughter on 24 October 2015.
