= Yor-yor =

Yor-yor/Ёр-ёр
- A screenshot from the movie (in Russian)
- Directed by: Ali Hamroyev
- Written by: Rahmat Fayziy
- Starring: Sohib Xoʻjayev; Baxtiyor Ixtiyorov; Shukur Burhonov; Alim Xoʻjayev; Razzoq Hamroyev; Rahim Pirmuhamedov; O. Tojiboyeva; G‘ani A’zamov; Tursunoy Jaʼfarova; Raʼno Hamroyeva; Hamza Umarov; Habib Narimonov; N. Eshmuhamedov; Qudrat Hojiyev; M. Orifjonova; U. Xoʻjayev; S. Ikromov
- Edited by: Odil Yoqubov
- Music by: Albert Malakhov; Manas (Minasay) Leviyev; A. Zokirov
- Production company: Uzbekfilm
- Release date: 1964
- Running time: 68 minutes
- Countries: Uzbek SSR, USSR
- Languages: Uzbek and Russian

Yor-yor or Gde ty, moya Zulfiya? (transliteration of the Russian title of the film meaning "Where are You, My Zulfiya?") (Uzbek: Yor-yor / Ёр-ёр; Russian: Где ты моя, Зульфия?) is a 1964 Uzbek musical comedy-drama film produced by Ali Hamroyev. The film is considered to be one of the best Uzbek comedies and has been dubbed the "national comedy."

== Plot ==
Baxtiyor (played by Baxtiyor Ixtiyorov) falls in love with a girl (Zulfiya) that he sees on TV. Deciding to find her, Baxtiyor travels across the Uzbek SSR with his father. They meet many different people and experience both funny and sad adventures, but do not find Zulfiya. Upon returning to Tashkent, Baxtiyor and his family move to a new flat from their old house which was located in an old part of the city. In the closing scene, Baxtiyor finds out that he and Zulfiya are neighbors in the new apartment block.
