= Akto Turkmen =

Ethnic group

ئاقتو تۈركمەن

Total population
- 4,900

Regions with significant populations
- Xinjiang
- China (Akto County): 2,000

Languages
- Akto dialect of Uyghur

Religion
- Sunni Islam

Related ethnic groups
- Kyrgyz, Uyghurs, Uzbeks, Turkmens

The Akto Turkmen (Uyghur: ئاقتو تۈركمەن) are a subgroup of the Kyrgyz people who live in Xinjiang, China. As a result of language shift, they have adopted the Uyghur language as their mother tongue. They reside in Akto County, in the Kizilsu Kyrgyz Autonomous Prefecture.

== History ==
The Akto claim to be from Samarqand, a city in modern Uzbekistan, who settled in the Xinjiang region of China during the 17th century. The Akto have rebelled against the Chinese government many times since the Qing dynasty. In 1990, nearly 1,000 Akto Turkmens rebelled against the Chinese government and were mostly detained over separatist charges. It was organised by the East Turkestan Islamic Party, a Uyghur separatist group which plans to make Xinjiang independent.

== Culture ==
The Akto Turkmens are Sunni Muslims who observe both Kyrgyz and Uyghur festivals, as well as pre-Islamic traits. Though they speak Uyghur, they are recognised by the Chinese government as Kyrgyz. They primarily live in Akto County, as well as two villages outside Akto. They are skilled shepherds and goat herders.

== Language ==
The Akto Turkmen speak a distinct dialect of Uyghur known as Aqto Türkmen (ئاقتو تۈركمەن), which is considered by Ethnologue to be a variety of Uyghur under Turkmen influence. It is part of the Central Uyghur dialects which are the most spoken Uyghur dialects.
