= The Bodyguard (1979 film) =

1979 film

- Directed by: Ali Khamraev
- Written by: Ali Khamraev
- Produced by: Marat Khasanov
- Starring: Alexander Kaidanovsky; Anatoly Solonitsyn; Gulcha Tashbaeva; Shavkat Abdusalyamov
- Cinematography: Leonid Kalashnikov; Yuri Klimenko; Vyacheslav Semin
- Edited by: R. Vardanyan
- Music by: Eduard Artemyev
- Production company: Tajikfilm
- Release date: 1979
- Running time: 90 minutes
- Country: Soviet Union
- Language: Russian

The Bodyguard (Russian: Телохранитель, Telokhranitel') is a 1979 Soviet action film released by Tadjikfilm. It is one of the best known of the Osterns and directed by the feature and documentary maker Ali Khamraev, who also directed Without Fear (1971 Film), and The Seventh Bullet, both set in similar settings in the same time period.

== Setting ==
The film is set during the Russian Civil War, in the 1920s. Though at the time power in European Russia was mostly controlled by the Bolsheviks, the Basmachi revolution in Central Asia remained a significant threat to Soviet power. Central Asia is a common setting for Soviet filmmakers, and has provided the location of many propaganda films such as The Muslim Woman; specifically, the film takes place in the Tadjik S.S.R., the director, Ali Khamraev, was half Tajik.

== Plot ==
When a Red Army detachment captures Sultan Nazar (Anatoly Solonitsyn), the leader behind the Basmachi contingent, a decision is made to escort the prisoner to Tashkent with deliberate speed. The mission's success is entrusted to a mountain trapper and revolutionary Mirzo. His expertise is essential to traverse the paths and mountain ridges along the way, impossible terrain for the inexperienced.

A group consisting of Mirzo (Alexander Kaidanovsky), his brother Kova, the Sultan (Nazar), his daughter Zarangis (D. Alimova) and slave Saifulla set off on this journey, pursued doggedly along the way by Fottabek (Shavkat Abdusalyamov), the ruthless new head of the Basmachis, who wishes to take the Tamga of the sultan so that he can make his sorceress wife, Aibash, into the Queen of Asia. Along the way, the protagonists have to traverse a narrow cliff's edge. The Sultan Panics and allows his slave to fall to his death.

Fottabek eventually catches up with the Sultan, at the end of the film, taking his tamga and then attempting to leave. He is bludgeoned by the Sultan, and likely killed. The last scene with him in involves him crawling towards Aibash, who is apathetic. They

The story of Mirzo is resolved when the Sultan, who is carrying him away from his fight with Fottabek, is accosted by Red Army soldiers. Hearing them coming, Nazar dumps Mirzo and all of his money into the river. Mirzo is rescued, and returns to his village, and Nazar is taken to Tashkent, where he is likeley to be executed.

== Cast ==
- Alexander Kaidanovsky (dubbed by Sergey Shakurov) as Mirzo
- Anatoly Solonitsyn as Sultan Nazar
- Shavkat Abdusalyamov (dubbed by Oleg Yankovsky) as Fottabek
- Gulcha Tashbaeva as Aibash, wife of Fottabek
- Nikolai Grinko as Nikolai Grigorievich, border guard commander
- D. Alimova as Zaranghis, daughter of Nazar
- G. Igamberdyev as Kula, younger brother of Mirzo
- Saidmurad Ziyautdinov as Saifulla, servant of Nazar
- Bolot Beishenaliev as Mashrab, sorcerer, shaman
- Rajab Adashev as Utash Ahmad Dodho
- Sh. Mavlyanov as Basmachi
- Saidmurad Saidmuradov as Nazar-aka, old hermit
- Anvar Alimov
