= Svetlaya Polyana =

Svetlaya Polyana Светлая Поляна
- village
- Location within Kyrgyzstan
- Coordinates: 42°20′58″N 78°04′04″E
- Country: Kyrgyzstan
- Region: Issyk-Kul Region
- District: Jeti-Ögüz District

Population (2023)
  - Total: 3,257

Svetlaya Polyana is a village in the Jeti-Ögüz District of Issyk-Kul Region of Kyrgyzstan. Its population was 3,234 in 2021.
