= Bakhargul Kerimova =

- Occupations: writer and poet

Bakhargul Kerimova is a writer from Turkmenistan. She has written both poetry and fiction during her career. A book of her short stories was published in Ashgabat in 1983, and a volume of her poetry was issued in 1988. She has remained active in public life in Turkmenistan since the breakup of the Soviet Union.
