= Abdurahmon Karimov =

Tajikistani politician

Abduraxmon Karimov is chairman of the political party Adolatkhoh in Tajikistan.
