= Malika Dina =

Kyrgyz singer (born 1995)

- Born: 19 December 1995 (age 30); Moscow, Russia
- Genre: Pop
- Occupation: Singer
- Instrument: Vocals

Malika-Dina Akulova (Kyrgyz: Малика-Дина Акулова; born 19 December 1998), known professionally as Malika Dina Akulova (Малика Дина), is a Kyrgyzstani singer.

== Biography ==
Malika Dina was born on 19 December 1998 in Moscow, the daughter of pop singer Dinara Akulova. She is the youngest of the three daughters and followed in her mother's footsteps. Malika Dina gave birth to a daughter on 24 October 2015.

== Discography ==
Studio albums

- Kızganamın (2021)

EP

- Jürösüŋ Jürögümdö (2021)
