= Samara Karimova =

Kyrgyz pop singer (born 1991)

- Birth name: Samara Ermekovna Karimova
- Born: 10 April 1991 (age 34); Özgörüsh, Batken Region, Kyrgyzstan, Soviet Union
- Genres: pop music
- Occupation(s): musician, songwriter, singer
- Instrument: vocals

Samara Ermekovna Karimova (Kyrgyz: Самара Эрмековна Каримова, born 10 April 1991) is a Kyrgyz singer who is considered a pop star in her homeland. She is a soloist of the National Theater in Osh. She is married and has three children.
