= Shala Kazakh =

Label in Kazakhstan

In the 18th-19th centuries, the Shala Kazakhs (Kazakh: Шалақазақтар, romanized: Şalaqazaqtar) were an ethnographic group of descendants of tatars, sarts, uyghurs, etc., migrated to Kazakhstan, intermarried with Kazakh women, but remained outside the Kazakh genealogy, because it propagates only via the male line. The literal translation for "shala" is "incomplete", "unripe".

The term is also applied to people of whom only one parent is Kazakh.

The term "Shala Kazakh" also has a pejorative meaning in Kazakhstan. It means part of the Kazakh society who don't know their native Kazakh language well or don't know it at all.

== See also ==
- Mankurt
