= Without Fear =

- Cover of Daredevil vol. 2, 100 (Oct 2007), art by Lee Bermejo
- Publisher: Marvel Comics
- Publication date: September 2007 – March 2008
- Genre: Superhero
- Title(s): Daredevil vol. 2, #100-105
- Main character(s): Daredevil; Mister Fear; Milla Donovan; Enforcers

Creative team
- Writer: Ed Brubaker
- Artist: Michael Lark
- Hell to Pay, Vol. 2: ISBN 0-7851-2815-8

"Without Fear" is a six-issue Daredevil story arc written by Ed Brubaker with art by Michael Lark and published by Marvel Comics focusing on Mister Fear's latest attempt to ruin Daredevil's life. The arc appears in Daredevil vol. 2 #100-105.

== Plot summary ==
Mister Fear resurfaces, along with the Enforcers at his side, providing the criminals of Hell's Kitchen a drug that causes the user to become psychotic and unafraid of death. In another attempt to make Daredevil's life miserable, Mister Fear gives the drug to Milla Donovan, Daredevil's wife. He is also approached by the Hood and offered a place in his criminal empire which he rejects. Meanwhile, Daredevil hunts down Mister Fear to force him into giving him an antidote to the drug. After Daredevil tracks down and beats Mister Fear in a one on one fight, the villain reveals that there is no antidote.

Mister Fear eventually surrenders to the police and confesses all of his wrongdoings, which sees him being sent to Ryker's Island for imprisonment. After his imprisonment, Mister Fear quickly rises to the top of the prison hierarchy, gaining respect and fear from prisoner and guard alike using a new compound his henchman created. He knows he can get out whenever he wants to, and strike at Daredevil again. The Hood is impressed by the blow delivered by Mister Fear, though he thinks it wise not to move things around Hell's Kitchen for a while, letting Daredevil delude himself thinking that at least he's accomplished one good thing out of the whole situation.

== Collected editions ==
The story arc was collected in a trade paperback as Daredevil: Hell to Pay, Vol. 2 (ISBN 0785128158).

== Reception ==
IGN gave Daredevil #100-#105, respectively, 7.8, 8.3, 7.6, 8.1 and 9.0 out of 10. The first issue of the story arc, Daredevil #100, with the combined sales of two printings, sold 78,120 copies. Daredevil #105 sold 42,072 copies.
