= The Seventh Bullet =

1972 film

- Directed by: Ali Khamraev
- Written by: Fridrikh Gorenshtein; Andrei Konchalovsky
- Starring: Dilorom Kambarova; Suimenkul Chokmorov; Bolot Bejshenaliyev; Talgat Nigmatulin
- Cinematography: Aleksandr Pann
- Music by: Rumil Vildanov
- Production company: Uzbekfilm
- Release date: 1972
- Running time: 84 min.
- Country: Soviet Union (Uzbek Soviet Socialist Republic)
- Language: Russian

Insfara Valley in Tadjikistan, where much of The Seventh Bullet was filmed.

The Seventh Bullet (Russian: Седьмая пуля, translit. Sedmaya pulya) is a Soviet Ostern film of 1972 directed by Ali Khamraev. (Russian: Али Хамраев)

In the same tradition as The White Sun of the Desert and The Bodyguard, The Seventh Bullet is set in the 1920s in Soviet Central Asia, after the end of the Russian Civil War and in the context of a waning Basmachi rebellion. Compared to other Osterns it can be considered closer to a typical war film.

== Plot ==
A commander (played by Suymenkul Chokmorov) dressed in the white uniform of a Red Army officer arrives at a Mosque in a devastated village, where he encounters a bearded man who throws a grenade and shouts "I won’t surrender alive!" Recognizing the man as one of his soldiers, Hashimov, the commander learns that a mutiny occurred while he was away. The uprising was sparked when Commissar Pyotr Ivanovich forbade Umar, a soldier, from performing his prayers. Many mutineers joined the band of Khairulla (Melis Abzalov), a local warlord, who has gained support from the local Muslims, who are distrustful of the atheistic Soviet state. Khairulla in the film commands around 200 men. Hashimov captures a prisoner who shows no fear of death, but the commander surprises everyone by handing the man a loaded pistol and releasing him, on the condition that he must tell Khairulla that the commander is looking for him. Later, a veiled woman, identified as Aigul (Dilorom Kambarova), visits the commander, asking him to kill Khairulla, deliver his head to Tashkent, and marry her. The commander doubts her intentions but suspects she can lead him to Khairulla.

Determined to reclaim his "Muslim Red Squad," the commander arms himself with six bullets in his revolver and a seventh hidden under his cap, reserved for Khairulla. The commander, who goes by Maksumov, makes his way to the valley where Aigul said that he would meet Khairula. Instead he is accosted by a team of bandits, joined by Aigul. He gives himself up, knowing that there is a bounty on his head, and thus the horsemen will take him to Khairulla. Along the way, they meet a neutral shepherd, Ismail, who mistakenly believes Maksumov killed his brother. When asked why Ismail doesn't accept the Soviets nor Khairulla, Ismail responds "I accept my mother only". Ismail attempts vengeance, only to be beaten by Khairulla's men.

While hostage at Ismail's farm, Maksumov is nearly freed by Aigul, who wants to run away with him so she can escape being married to Khairula. Ismail’s clan later ambushes the Bandits that have captured Maksumov; nearly annihilating them. The only Survivors of the ambush are Aigul and Maksumov, with Maksumov being taken back to Ismail's mother, who identifies that it was actually Khairula that killed his brother. Maksumov earns Ismail’s trust, and they unite against Khairulla.

Maksumov turns himself in to Khairula, in an attempt to get his men to turn on their new master and realign themselves with him. Though the detachment initially seems willing to comply, after Maksimov shoots one of them, they throw him to the floor and beat him. He is then locked in a cell, under guard of a man whose brother Maksimov has actually killed. Khairulla tells the Maksumov that tomorrow, he will be executed, with the aforementioned guard deciding on the method, and acting as executioner. Aigul tries to shoot Khairulla and free Maksumov, but is stopped by Khairulla. Ismail sneaks a revolver into his cell, which Maksumov uses to shoot his guard while he prays.

In a final battle, Ismail’s men, using throwing knives, seize a machine gun, demoralizing Khairulla's band. As Khairulla tries to flee, Maksumov kills him with the reserved seventh bullet by a border river. Aigul is found draped over Khairulla's horse, unresponsive, and judging by the bullet wound in her chest, probably dead. In the closing scene, Maksumov leads his reunited Red squad, riding under a crimson flag.

== Themes of Islam ==
Being killed during prayer, prayer scenes, and reference to Allah are common throughout the movie. The first scene, along with many others, is set in an abandoned Mosque. Several of Khairulla's men state their motivation for joining the mutiny is the Soviet repression of Islam, specifically the aforementioned incident of a soldier being reprimanded for prayer. Despite this, Maksumov mentions Allah frequently, implying that he is also a Muslim. Maksumov also implies multiple times that Khairulla, being a violent warlord, is not following the laws of Islam closely enough. He says that rather than being devout Muslims, his men are "illiterate, deceived, and stupid.” In this vein, the law of Qisas is also referenced, providing motivation for Ismail, and later, Maksumov's guard at the end of the film.

With regards to veiling, and women in Islam, the film's female supporting character, Aigul, is at two points in the film told to veil by the men around her, which she refuses. On the first of these occasions, she is made to wear a sack instead, as 'punishment' for her disobedience. The concept of "The Veiled Woman" was a recurring theme for the director, Ali Khamraev, as seen in his 1971 film Without Fear. Without Fear also stars Dilorom Khambarova. Khairulla, near the end of the film, says to his other wife, who he prefers over Aigul, "If you had robes and a beard, you would be as wise as a Mullah," There are only three women in the film, these being, Aigul, Ismail's mother, and Khairulla's primary wife.
