= Ali Hamroyev =

Uzbek film director, screenwriter, and documentarian

Ali Hamroyev Али Хамроев
- Born: Ali Ergashevich Hamroyev; May 19, 1937 (age 89); Tashkent, Uzbek SSR, USSR
- Occupations: actor, film director, screenwriter, and film producer
- Awards: Meritorious Artist of the Uzbek SSR (1969); State Hamza Prize (1971)

Ali Khamraev (sometimes spelled Ali Khamrayev, or Ali Hamraev in English) (Uzbek: Ali Hamroyev, Али Ҳамроев; Russian: Али Хамраев) (born May 19, 1937) is an Uzbek actor, film director, screenwriter, and film producer. He is best known in the former Soviet Union for his works in the 1960s and 1970s. Since 1988 he has been living in Italy.

To date, Hamroyev has made over 30 documentary and over 20 feature films. His most famous films include Yor-yor (1964), Without Fear (1971 Film) (1971) The Seventh Bullet (1972), The Bodyguard (1979), and Vuodillik kelin (1984). Hamroyev has received many honorary titles and awards, including the title Meritorious Artist of Uzbekistan (1969).

== Life and work ==
Ali Hamroyev was born on May 19, 1937, in Tashkent, then the Uzbek SSR. He graduated from the Gerasimov Institute of Cinematography (VGIK) in 1961. That same year he started working at Uzbekfilm.

Hamroyev is best known in the former Soviet Union for his works in the 1960s and 1970s. He has made over 30 documentary and over 20 feature films throughout his career. Hamroyev is still working today. In 2010, he announced that Jack Nicholson had agreed to portray Timur in his new movie.

== Filmography ==
=== As director ===
- Bolalar haqida kichik hikoyalar (Russian: Маленькие истории о детях, которые...) (Short Stories about Children) (1961)
- Любит — не любит? (Does He/She Love or Not?) (1964)
- Yor-yor (Russian: Где ты, моя Зульфия?) (Yor-Yor) (1964)
- Laylak keldi, yoz boʻldi (Russian: Белые, белые аисты) (The White Storks) (1966)
- Dilorom (1967)
- Qizil qum (Russian: Красные пески) (The Red Sands) (1968)
- Favqulodda komissar (Russian: Чрезвычайный комиссар) (The Extraordinary Commissar) (1970)
- Без страха (Fearless) (1971)
- Yettinchi oʻq (Russian: Седьмая пуля) (The Seventh Bullet) (1972)
- Muxlis (Russian: Поклонник) (The Fan) (1973)
- Inson qushlar ortidan boradi (Russian: Человек уходит за птицами) (The Man is after Birds) (1975)
- Триптих (Triptych) (1978)
- Телохранитель (The Bodyguard) (1979)
- Жаркое лето в Кабуле (A Hot Summer in Kabul) (1983)
- Vuodillik kelin (Russian: Невеста из Вуадиля) (A Bride from Vuodil) (1984)
- Я тебя помню (I Remember You) (1985)
- Сад желаний (The Garden of Desires) (1988)
- Kim jinni? (Russian: Кто сумасшедший?) (Who is Insane?) (1992)
- Bo Ba Bu (1998)
- Место под солнцем (A Place under the Sun) (2004)
- Артисты (The Artists) (2007)
- Аромат дыни в Самарканде (The Scent of Melon in Samarkand) (2021)

=== As actor ===
- Место под солнцем (A Place under the Sun) (2004)

=== As screenwriter ===
- Laylak keldi, yoz boʻldi (Russian: Белые, белые аисты) (The White Storks) (1966)
- Dilorom (1967)
- Favqulodda komissar (Russian: Чрезвычайный комиссар) (The Extraordinary Commissar) (1970)
- Без страха (Fearless) (1971)
- Эшмат — добрый ангел (Eshmat — A Kind Angel) (1979) (short film)
- Телохранитель (The Bodyguard) (1979)
- Стрелять сгоряча не стоит (Shooting Rashly is not Worth It) (1983)
- Vuodillik kelin (Russian: Невеста из Вуадиля) (A Bride from Vuodil) (1984)
- Я тебя помню (I Remember You) (1985)
- Kim jinni? (Russian: Кто сумасшедший?) (Who is Insane?) (1992)
- Bo Ba Bu (1998)
- Аромат дыни в Самарканде (The Scent of Melon in Samarkand) (2021)

== Awards ==
Hamroyev has received many honorary titles and awards throughout his career, including the title Honored Artist of the Uzbek SSR (1969). In 1971, he received the State Hamza Prize.

In 2021 won an award at the 5th FELIX Film Festival in Milan with "The Scent of Melon in Samarkand"
