= Fyodor Iordan =

Russian engraver

- Фёдор Иванович Иордан
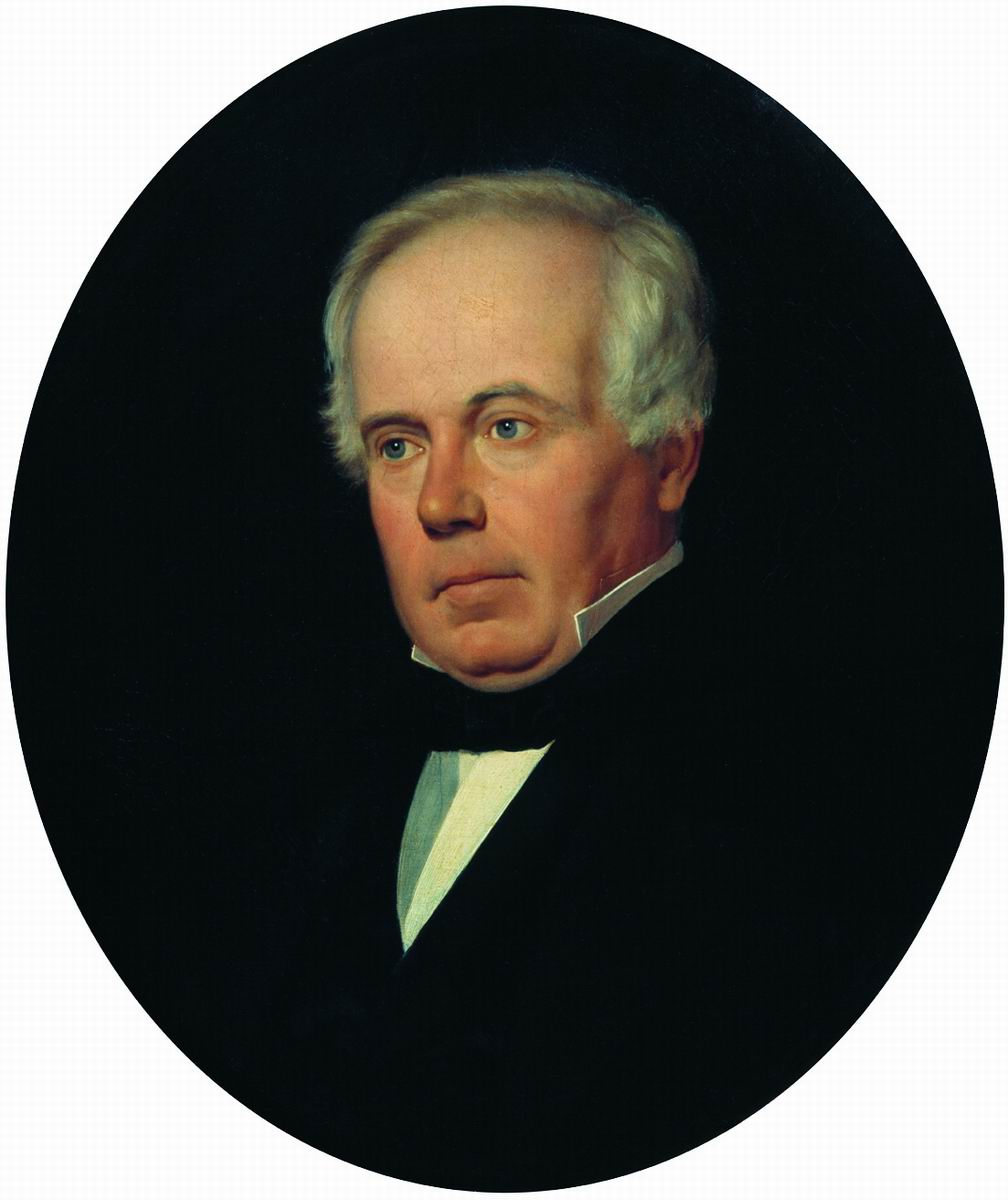
- Portrait by Sergey Zaryanko, 1855, oils
- Born: 13 August 1800; Pavlovsk, Saint Petersburg, Russia
- Died: 19 September 1883 (aged 83); Saint Petersburg, Russia
- Resting place: Smolensky Cemetery, St. Petersburg
- Education: Nikolai Utkin
- Alma mater: Imperial Academy of Arts (1827)
- Known for: Engraving
- Awards: Big Gold Medal of the Imperial Academy of Arts (1827)
- Elected: Member Academy of Arts (1844); Professor by rank (1850)

Friedrich Ludwig Jordan, russified as Fyodor Ivanovich Iordan (13 August 1800 – 19 September 1883) was a Russian engraver and art professor. He was best known for portraits and reproductions of the Old Masters.

== Biography ==
His father was the upholsterer for the Imperial Court. He was enrolled in the primary school courses at the Imperial Academy of Arts and, in 1819, entered the engraving class, serving as an apprentice of Nikolai Utkin. He graduated in 1824 and received a gold medal for his engraving, "Mercury lulls Argus", after a painting by Pyotr Sokolov. Shortly after, he was awarded another gold medal at one of the Academy's exhibitions for his rendering of the "Dying Abel", after a work by Anton Losenko.

In 1829, he went to Paris, where he studied with Théodore Richomme. When the July Revolution began, he moved to London, continuing his studies with Abraham Raimbach and John Henry Robinson. In 1834, he settled in Rome where, at the urging of Karl Briullov, he produced a huge engraving of the Transfiguration by Raphael, which took him twelve (some sources say fifteen) years to complete. As a result of this work, he became an honorary member of the Academy of Arts, Berlin and the Accademia delle Arti del Disegno in Florence. He was named an Academician by the Imperial Academy in 1844 and was awarded the title of Professor in 1850, when he returned to Saint Petersburg.

After the death of Stepan Galaktionov in 1854, he became head of the engraving department at the Academy and was appointed an assistant curator for prints and drawings at the Hermitage. The following year, he married Varvara Pushchin (1833-1916), a sister-in-law to the poet Pyotr Pletnyov. In 1861, he gave private engraving lessons to Taras Shevchenko. He was promoted to head curator of prints after the death of Nikolai Utkin in 1863. Eight years later, he became a Rector in the painting and sculpture departments (the only time this position has been held by an engraver) and, in 1876, was named a superintendent in the mosaic division. Towards the end of his life, he was appointed Privy Councilor.

== Selected portraits ==
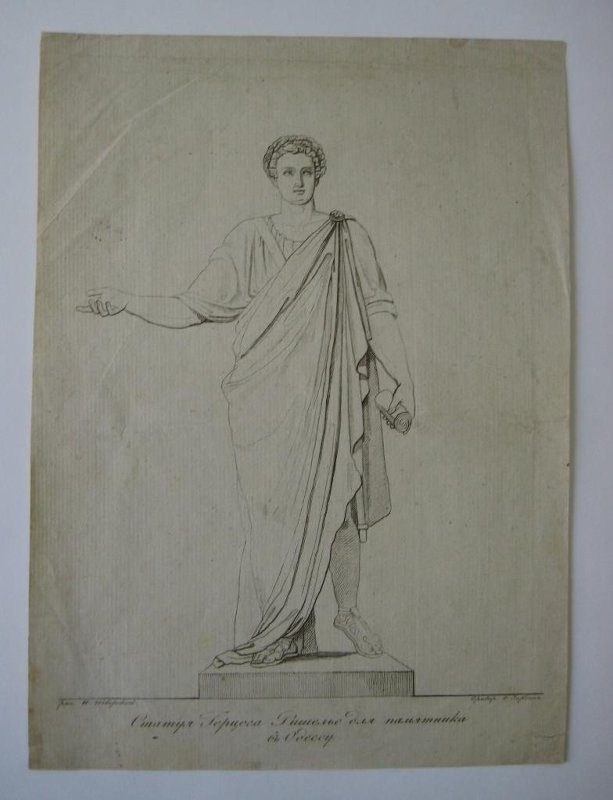
Monument to the 5th Duke of Richelieu, after the drawing by Nikolay Tverskoy from the sculpture by Ivan Martos, 1825

Nikolai Gogol, after Fyodor Moller, c. 1857

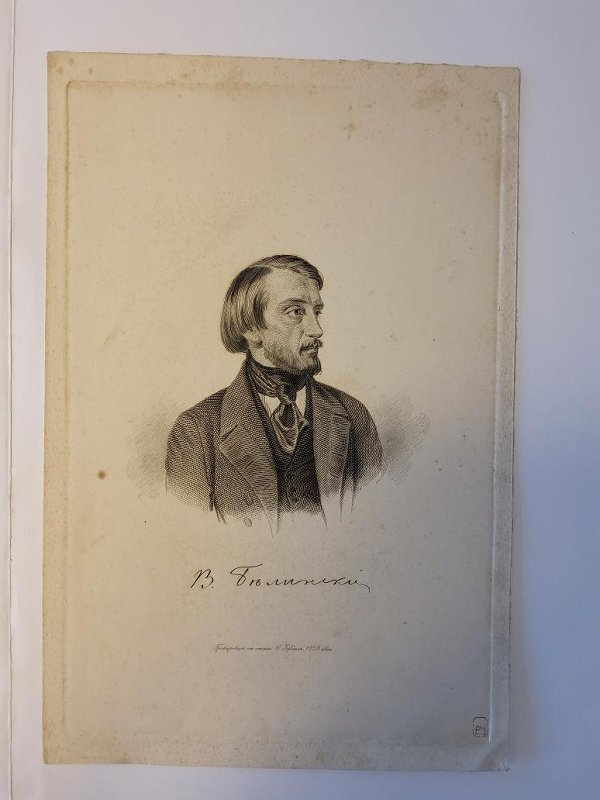
Vissarion Belinsky, after Kirill Gorbunov, 1859

Mikhail Lermontov, after Gorbunov, 1859

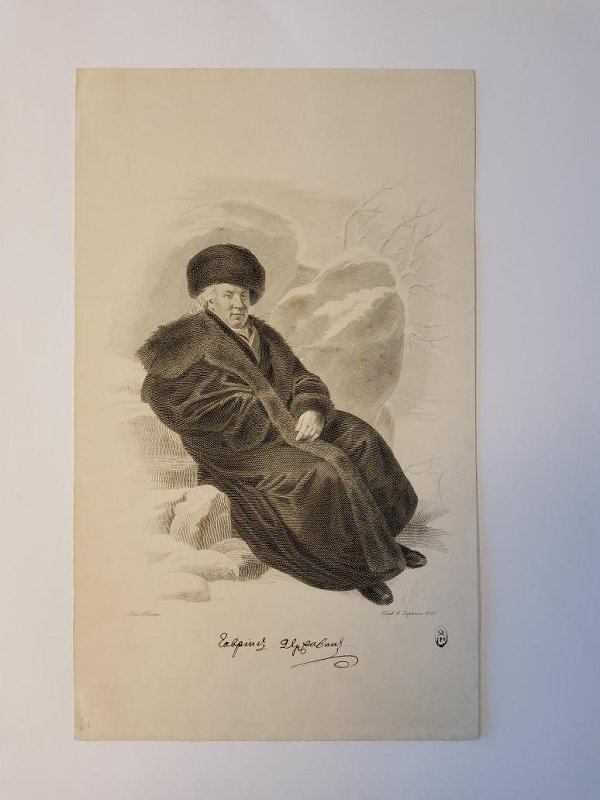
Gavrila Derzhavin, after Salvatore Tonci, 1861

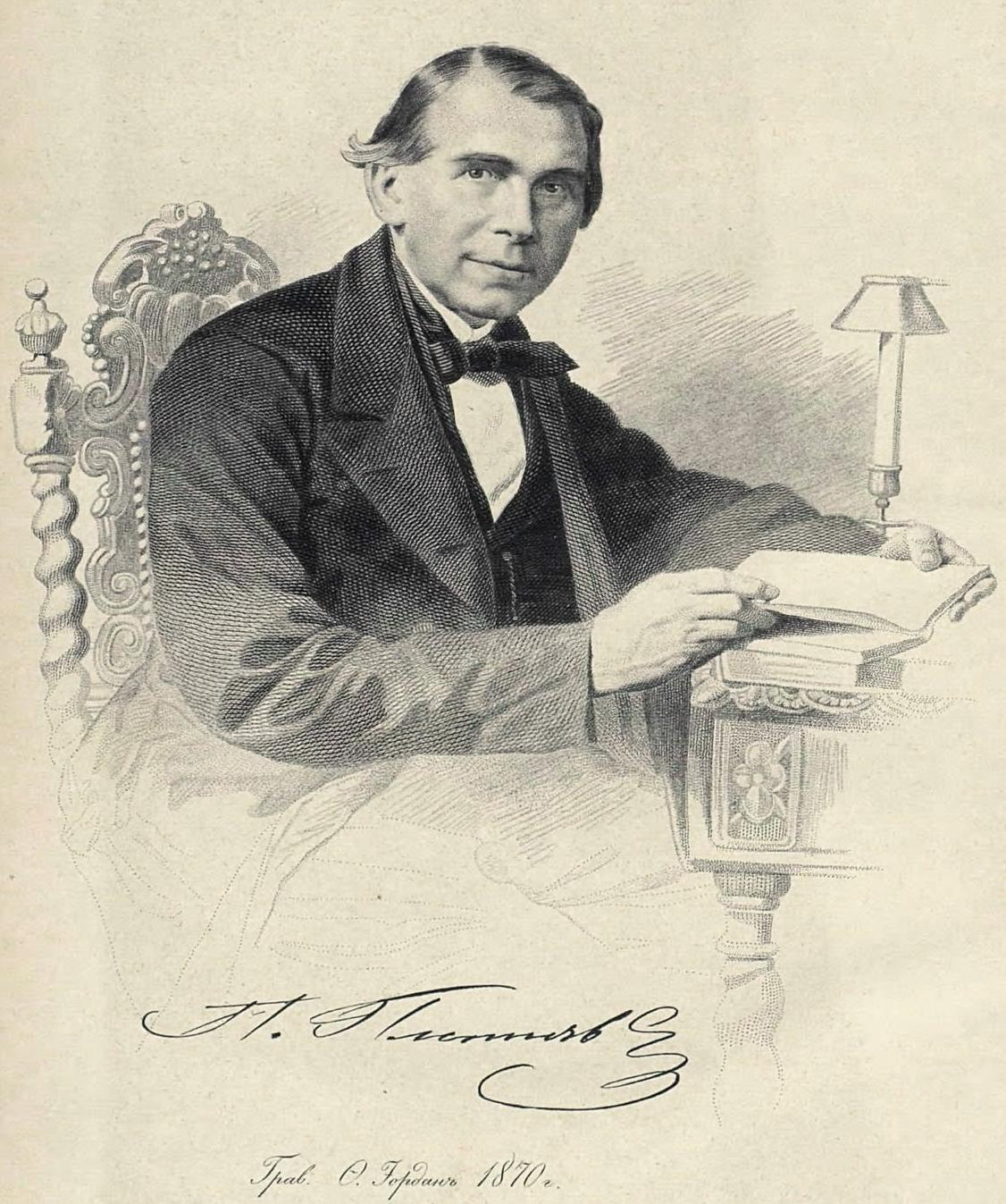
Pyotr Pletnyov, 1870

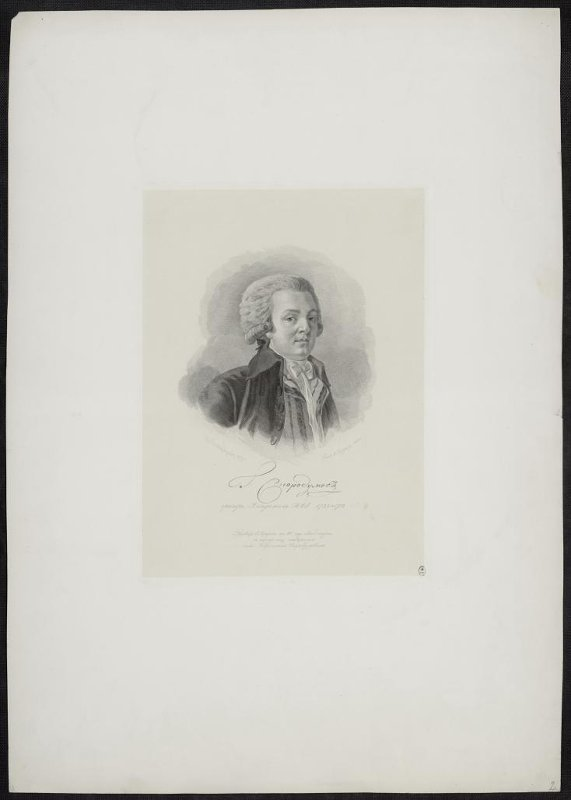
Gavrila Skorodumov, after Skorodumov's self-portrait of c. 1785–1786, 1882

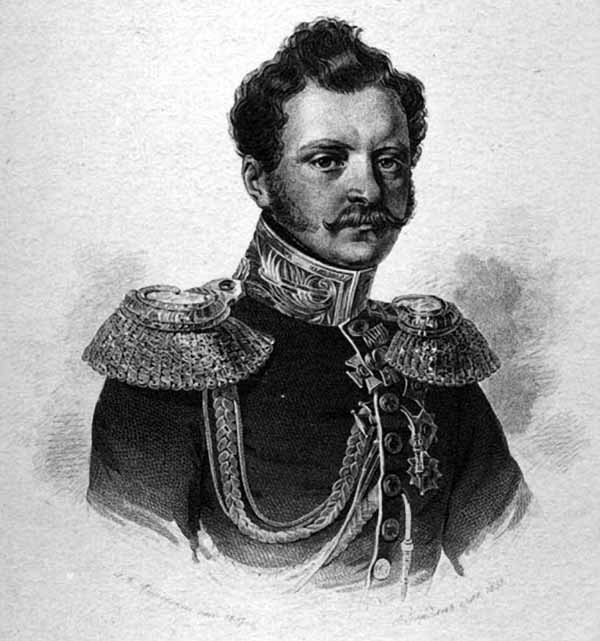
Grand Duke Michael Pavlovich

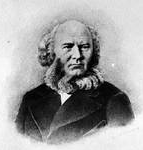
Dmitry Rovinsky

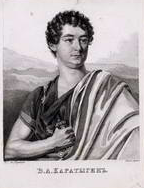
Vasily Karatygin

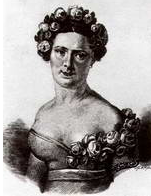
Avdotia Istomina
