= Klauber =

Klauber is a surname. Notable people with the surname include:

- Abraham Klauber (1831–1911), Czech-American businessman, father of Laurence
- Adolph Klauber (1879–1933), American drama critic and producer
- Gertan Klauber (1932–2008), Czech-British character actor
- Laurence Monroe Klauber (1883–1968), American herpetologist, businessman and inventor
- Klauber (German engravers), a family of German artists
