= Nikolai Utkin =

Russian graphic artist, engraver and illustrator

- Николай Уткин
- Portrait by Yakov Yanenko (1824)
- Born: May 8, 1780; Tver, Russia
- Died: March 5, 1863 (aged 82); Saint Petersburg, Russia
- Education: Member Academy of Arts
- Alma mater: Imperial Academy of Arts
- Known for: Engraving
- Awards: Big Gold Medal of the Imperial Academy of Arts (1802)

Nikolai Ivanovich Utkin (Russian: Николай Иванович Уткин; 19 May 1780 – 17 March 1863) was a Russian graphic artist, engraver and illustrator. He also served as curator of prints at the Hermitage and superintendent of the museum at the Imperial Academy of Arts.

== Biography ==
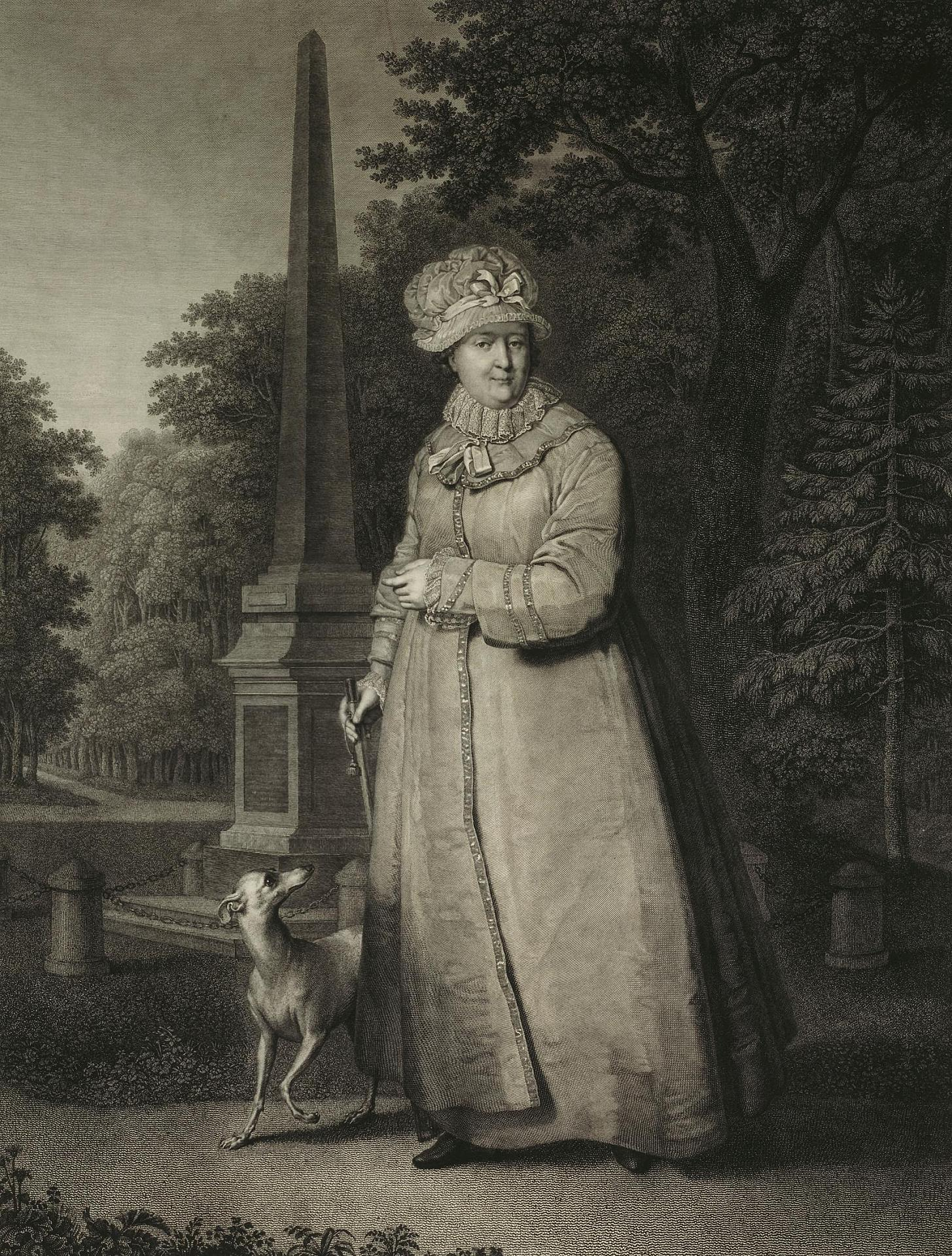
Catherine the Great Out for a Walk, after a painting by Vladimir Borovikovsky; his most familiar work.

His mother was a serf on the estate of the poet Mikhail Nikitich Muravyov, who is generally assumed to have been his father. She was later given in marriage to Muravyov's chamberlain, Ivan Utkin. Shortly after Nikolai's birth, they moved to Saint Petersburg. In 1785, he was manumitted and began his education at the Imperial Academy which, at that time, had a primary school.

At the age of fourteen, having shown a talent for drawing, he was transferred to the engraving school, where he studied with Antoine Radigues and the German engraver, Ignaz Sebastian Klauber. Four years later, he created eighteen engravings of antique statues, which earned him a gold medal and the right to continue at the Academy for three more years. However, in 1802, he was awarded another gold medal that also conferred the right to travel abroad and he took advantage of that right as soon as possible; leaving for Paris in 1803.

Once there, he was engaged at the workshop of Charles Clément Balvay (known as "Bervic"), where he helped fulfill orders as well as study. In 1810, he exhibited at the Salon, receiving a gold medal from the Académie des Beaux-Arts and the title of "Academician" from the Imperial Academy. During the French invasion of Russia, he was under house arrest and police surveillance for two years, until Napoleon's defeat.

He returned to Saint Petersburg upon his release and, after Klauber's death, took his positions at the Academy and the Hermitage. In 1819, he was appointed official engraver to the Tsar, at a salary of 3,000 rubles per year. His best-known students at the Academy included Antoni Oleszczyński, Fyodor Iordan and Georg Johann Heitman. In addition to his regular engravings, he provided illustrations for works by Vasily Zhukovsky and Gavrila Derzhavin, as well as a translation of the Iliad by Nikolai Gnedich.

He became a Professor in 1831 and was named Professor Emeritus in 1840 but, at that point, he was already past the height of his creative powers. In 1850, he handed over his engraving class to Iordan. In 1860, the Academy honored him with an embossed gold medallion. His last known work, a depiction of the Holy Family, was completed just before his death in 1863.

== Selected works ==
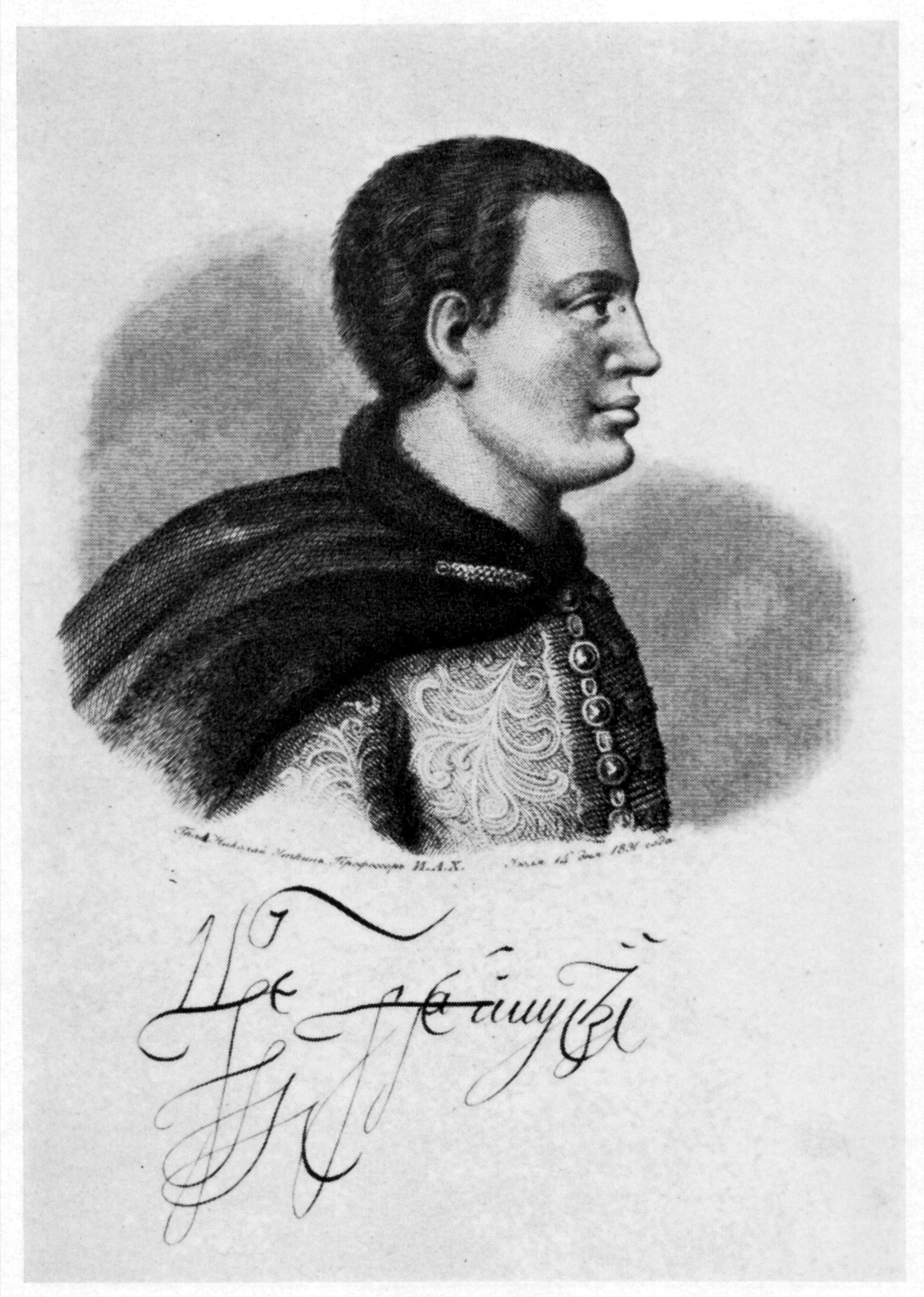
The False Dmitriy

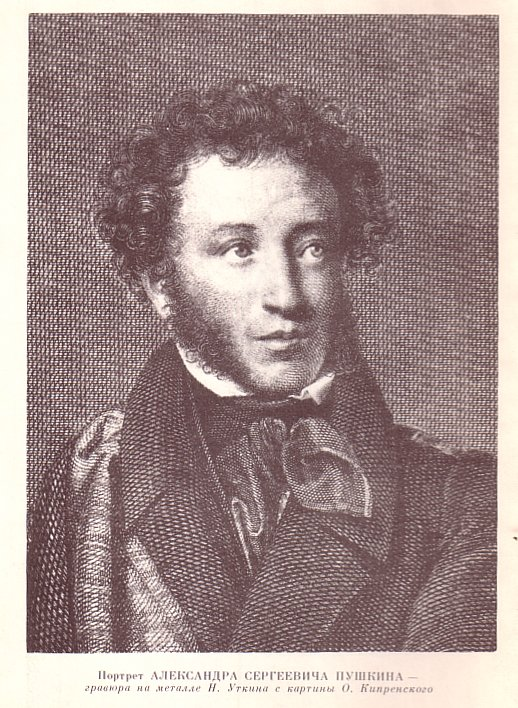
Alexander Pushkin
(after Kiprensky)

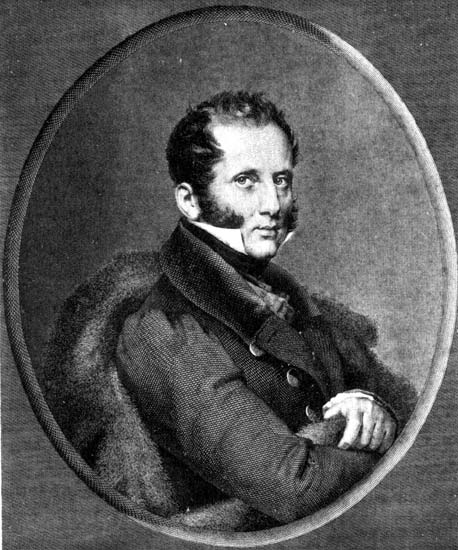
Sergey Uvarov

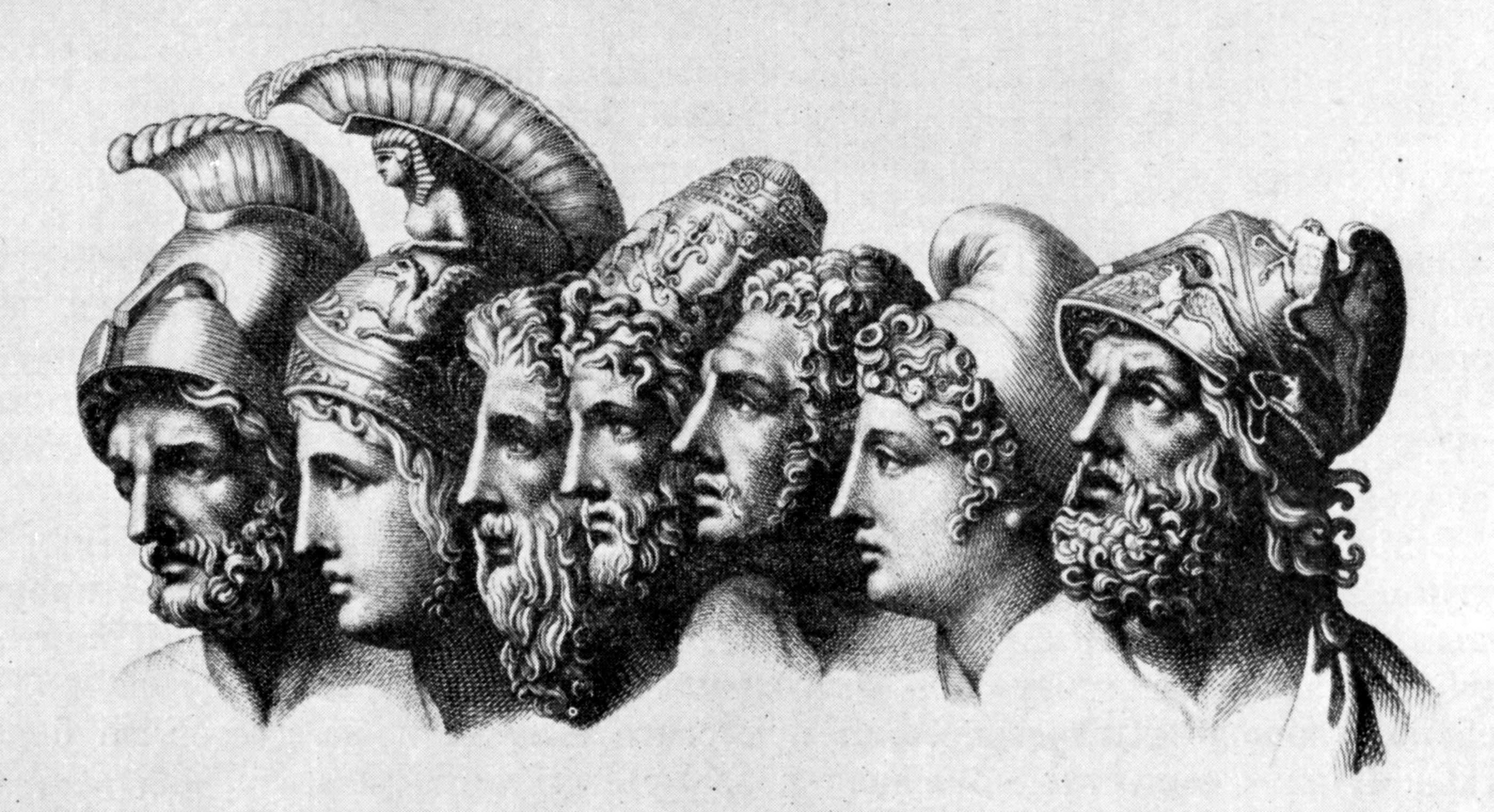
The Heroes of the Iliad
(after Tischbein)
