= Mikhail Ivanovich Belsky =

Russian Classical painter

Mikhail Ivanovich Belsky (Russian: Михаи́л Ива́нович Бе́льский; 1753 — 29 May 1794) was a Russian painter, active in St. Petersburg during Catherine the Great's reign, commonly known for his portraits.

== Biography ==
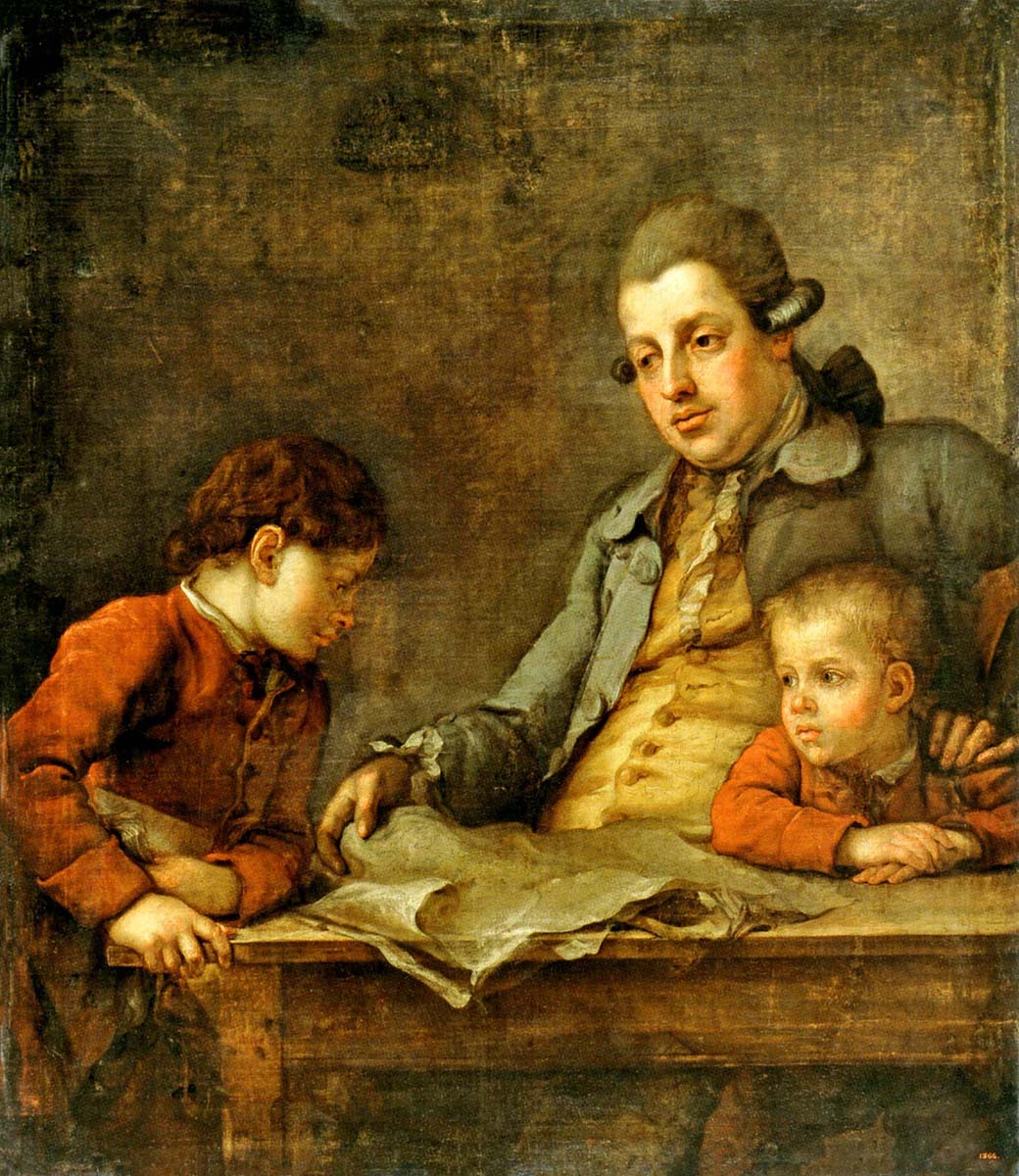
Mr. Baudouin with Academical Pupils, 1773; Russian Museum, acquired in 1910, formerly owned by and lost from the Academy of Arts

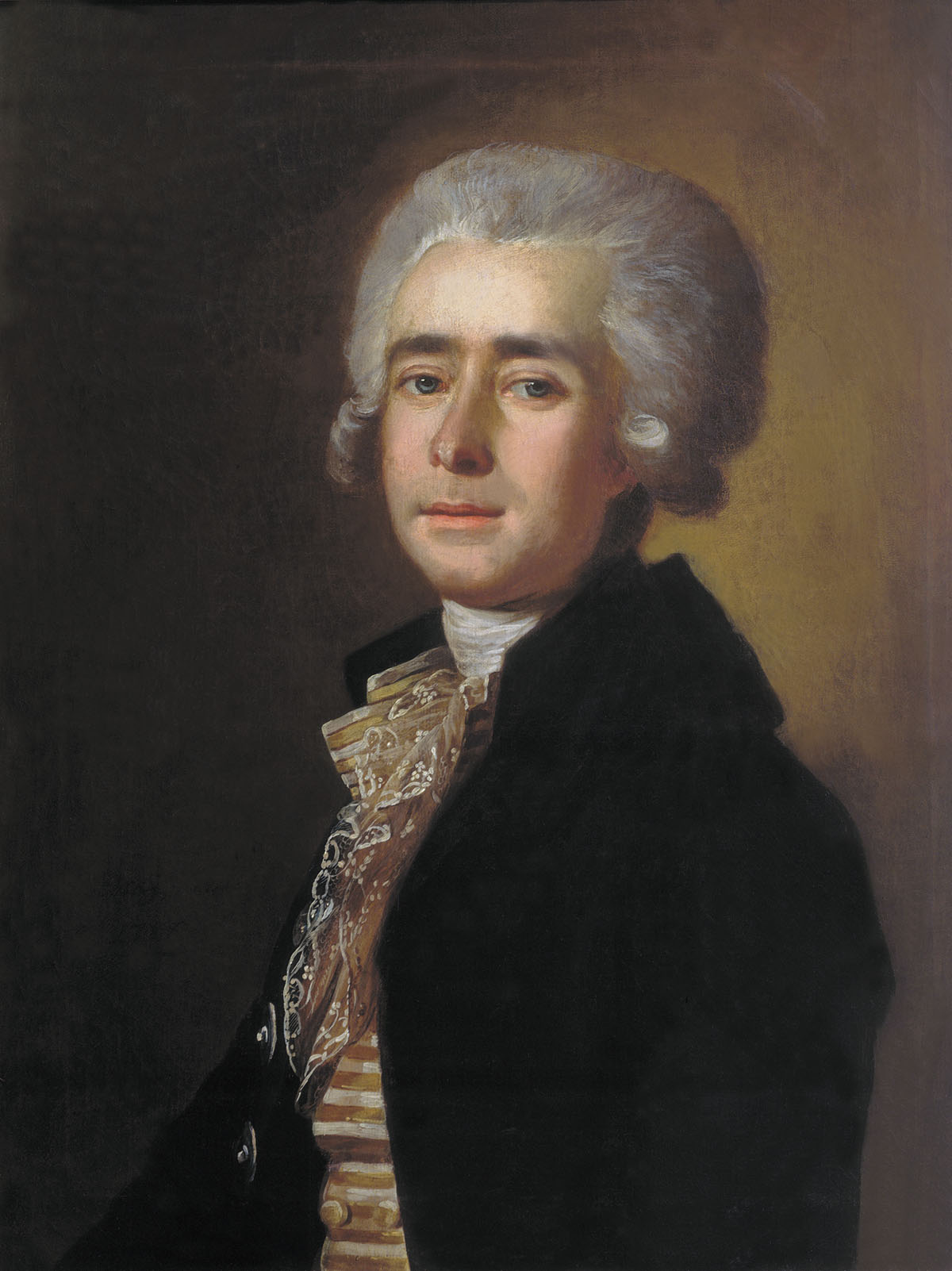
Dmitry Bortniansky, signed and dated 1788; Tretyakov Gallery, acquired by Pavel Tretyakov in 1896

His father, Ivan Ivanovich Belsky, was a history painter and Academician at the Imperial Academy of Arts. In 1770, the Academy awarded him a silver medal for his outstanding classwork. His primary instructors there were Anton Losenko and Dmitry Levitzky.

In 1773, together with the fellow alumni, engraver Gavriil Skorodumov, he was awarded a travel grant to study abroad, in London. They received 300 Rubles per year, and letters of recommendation. When they arrived, they were placed under the patronage of Count Alexei Semyonovich Musin-Pushkin, the Russian Envoy. Classes at the Royal Academy of Arts were open to them, they were able to copy the Old Masters, attend lectures and travel throughout the provinces.

In 1776, they were scheduled to continue their travels, but Skorodumov chose to remain in London. Belsky went to Paris and became a student of Joseph Duplessis, at his father's expense.

Very little is known of his life beyond that point, except that he returned to Russia and worked as a portrait painter in St. Petersburg; in 1787, he was elected an Academician Canditate for his portrait, likely lost, of historian Alexei Ivanovich Musin-Pushkin. Few of his paintings have been identified with any certainty and most are believed to be in the possession of their subject's families.

As of the early 21st century, Belsky's surviving body of work consists of only a small number of works present in public museums across post-Soviet nations. Among these, the 1788 portrait of composer Dmitry Bortniansky, in the Tretyakov Gallery, virtually is the only notable, for it was acquired by Pavel Tretyakov. The Russian Museum, St. Petersburg holds Belsky's diploma work of 1773, the portrait of the certain Baudouin with two academical pupils, as well as some drawings from academical years. In Kyiv, the Picture Gallery owns a large painting of the siege of Ochakov, signed and dated 1794, reported to be a loose copy after the 1790 piece by Francesco Casanova.
