= Gavriil Skorodumov =

Russian engraver, draftsman and painter

- Гавриил Скородумов
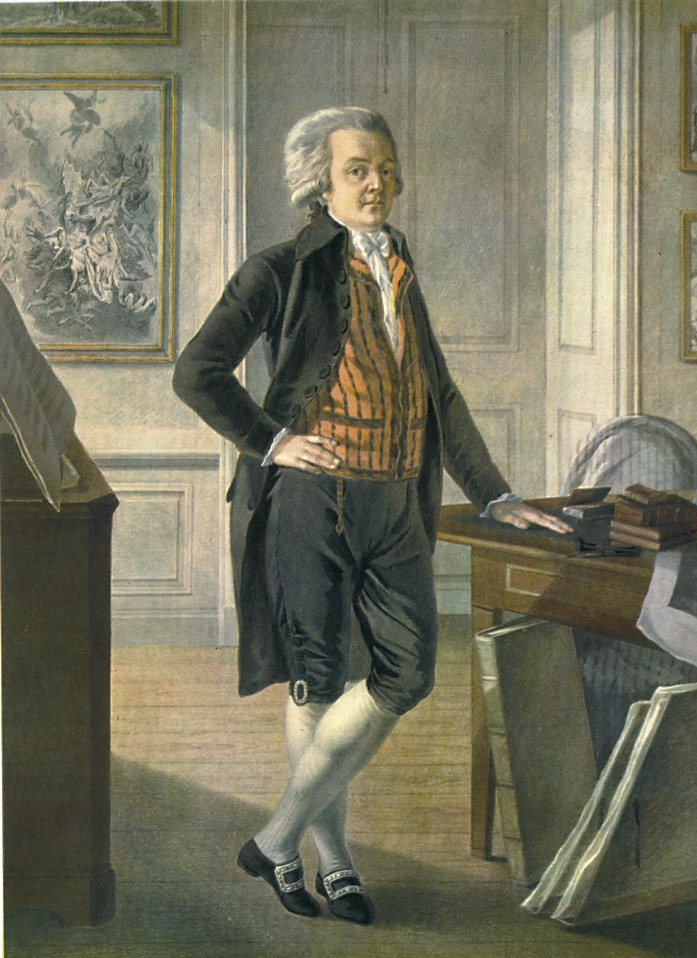
- Self-Portrait in the Print Room of the Hermitage, c. or after 1785, watercolor, Russian Museum, Saint Petersburg
- Born: March 12, 1755; Saint Petersburg
- Died: July 12, 1792 (aged 37); Saint Petersburg
- Resting place: Smolensky Cemetery, Saint Petersburg
- Education: Anton Losenko; Antoine Radigues; Francesco Bartolozzi
- Alma mater: Imperial Academy of Arts (1773)
- Known for: Engraving; draftsmanship; painting
- Awards: Big Gold Medal of the Imperial Academy of Arts (1772)
- Elected: Member Academy of Arts (1785)

Gavriil Ivanovich Skorodumov (Russian: Гавриил Иванович Скородумов; 12 March 1755 – 12 July 1792) was a Russian engraver, draftsman, and painter, best known for his stipple prints. The most notable printmaker from the Catherinian era, Skorodumov had an active career that spanned three decades, and was regarded as the first Russian-born artist to gain international acclaim.

== Biography ==
He was born into a family of hereditary craftsmen. In 1764, he was admitted to the Imperial Academy of Arts, where he studied painting and engraving with Grigoriy Srebrenitsky, Johann Stenglin and Anton Losenko. In 1772, he graduated with a large gold medal for his engraving, Lot with His Daughters, after a painting by Louis-Jean-François Lagrenée. The medal came with a grant for travelling abroad.

The following year, he and Mikhail Belsky, another grant recipient, went to London together. He studied in the workshop of the famous engraver, Francesco Bartolozzi, where he learned engraving techniques that were not in use in Russia (stippling and the "crayon manner"). Before he had finished his studies, he was already taking orders from local publishers, reproducing works by Joshua Reynolds and Benjamin West. He established his fame with 24 engravings based on works by Angelica Kaufman, an especially fashionable artist.

Although he was supposed to leave England in 1776, he continued to put off his return to Russia for as long as possible. He finally yielded in 1782, when he heard that Empress Catherine admired his work and would "give him a thousand two hundred rubles and a thousand for the trip, if only he promised not to be lazy". Upon his arrival in St. Petersburg, she named him Court Engraver and caretaker of engravings at the Hermitage Museum, with a salary of 1,200 Rubles, an apartment worth 600 Rubles, and his own personal printer.

Things did not go as well as planned, however. Within a few months of his arrival, the Empress was apparently tired of his constant complaints and hinted that he was free to leave if he wished. In 1783, she noted that nobody had seen any of his works. In the Spring of 1784, she suspended his salary until he had something to show for it. Nobody knows for certain why his productivity declined, although drinking has been suggested as a likely cause. In 1789, Ivan Krylov published a satire in his magazine, Почта духов, in which one of the characters, an artist named Trudolyubov (Hardworking), laments that he misses England, was better paid there, and is so depressed that he became a drunkard.

During the last few years of his life, he managed to produce some engravings and portrait miniatures. In 1791, he began work on an album, with twelve scenes of St. Petersburg, that was never completed. On the day of his death, he was the guest of a merchant named Strunnikov. After dinner, he laid down on some damp grass to take a nap. By evening, he had become deranged, and was dead before morning, aged only thirty-seven.

== Works ==
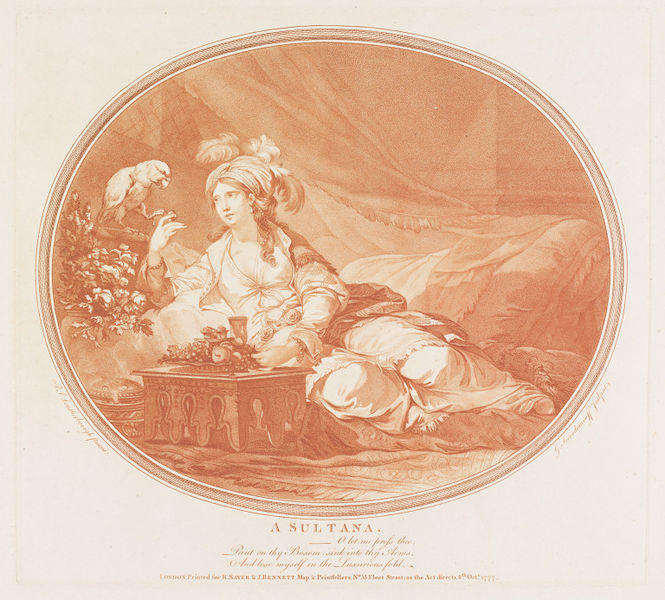
A Sultana, after Philippe Jacques de Loutherbourg, 1777

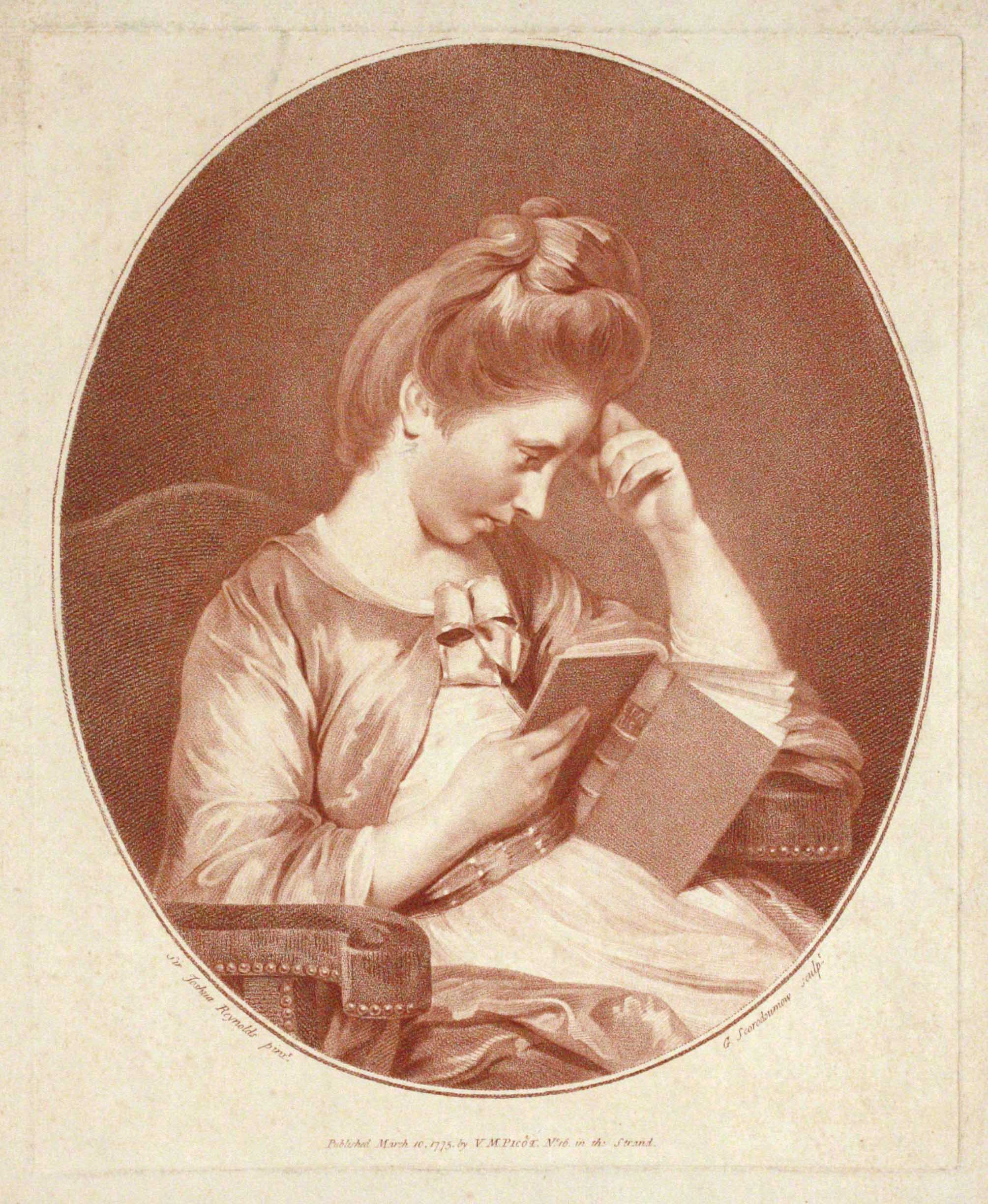
Reflections on Clarissa Harlowe, after Joshua Reynolds, 1775

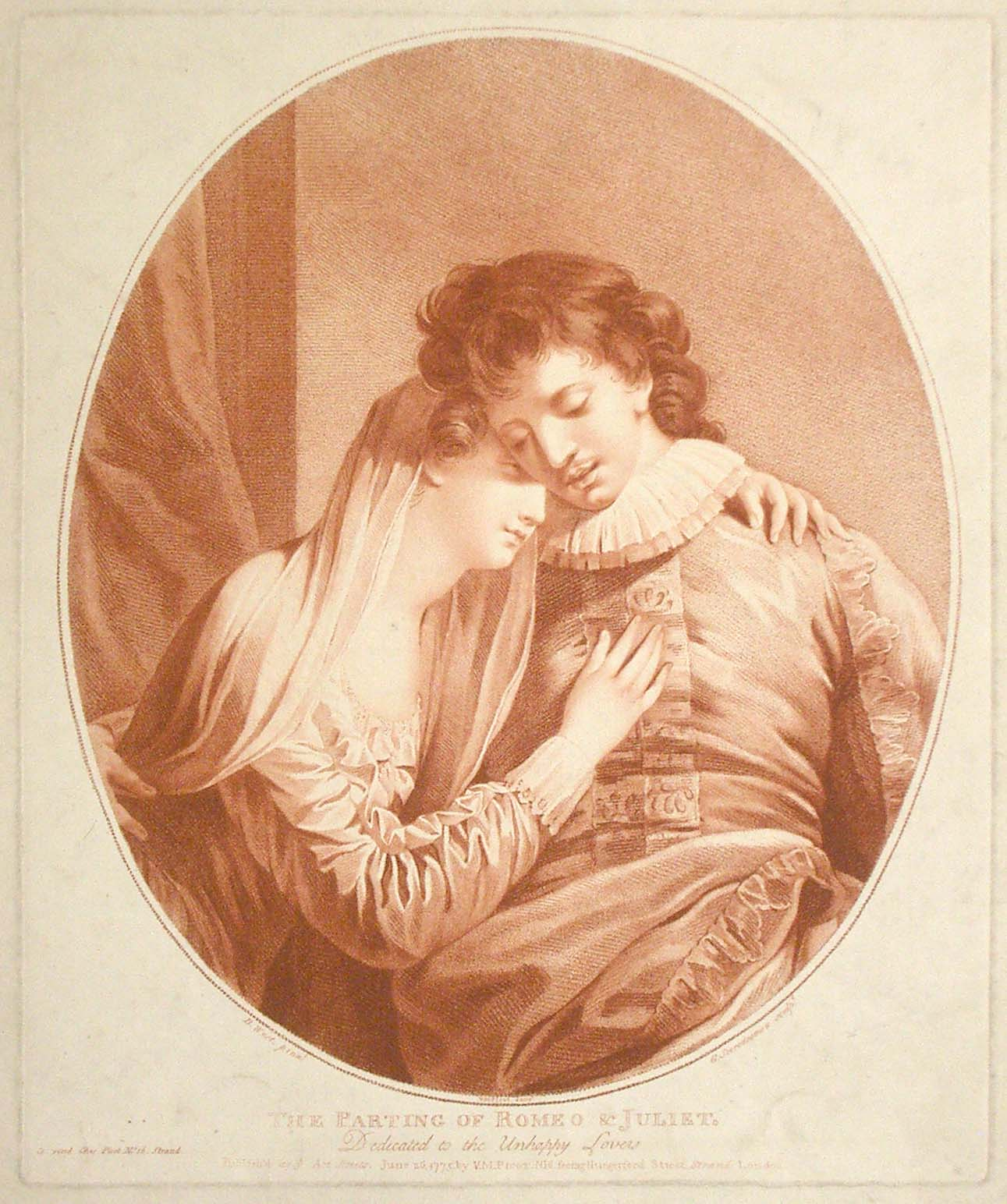
Romeo Parting with Juliet, after Benjamin West, 1775

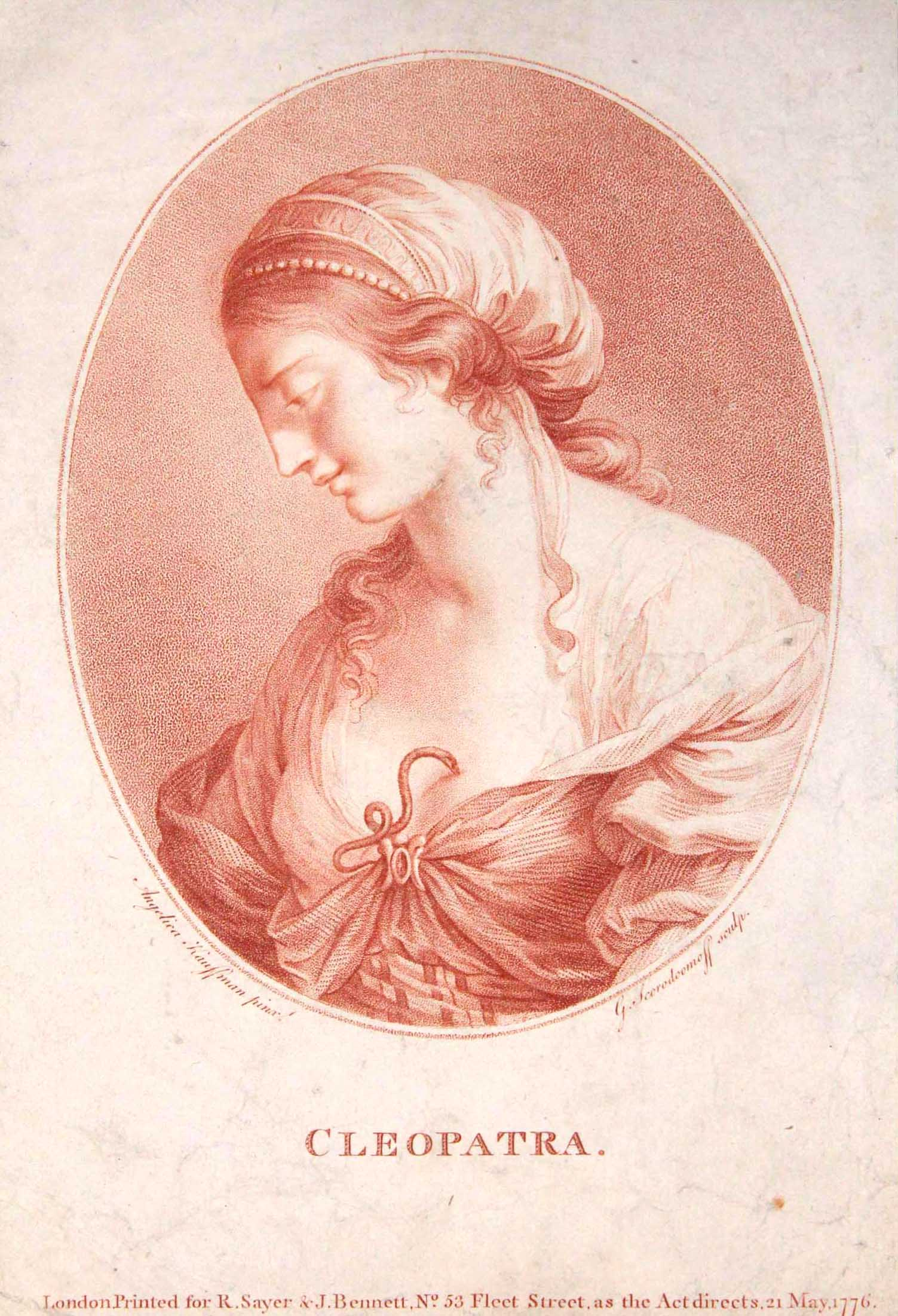
Cleopatra, after Angelica Kauffman, 1776

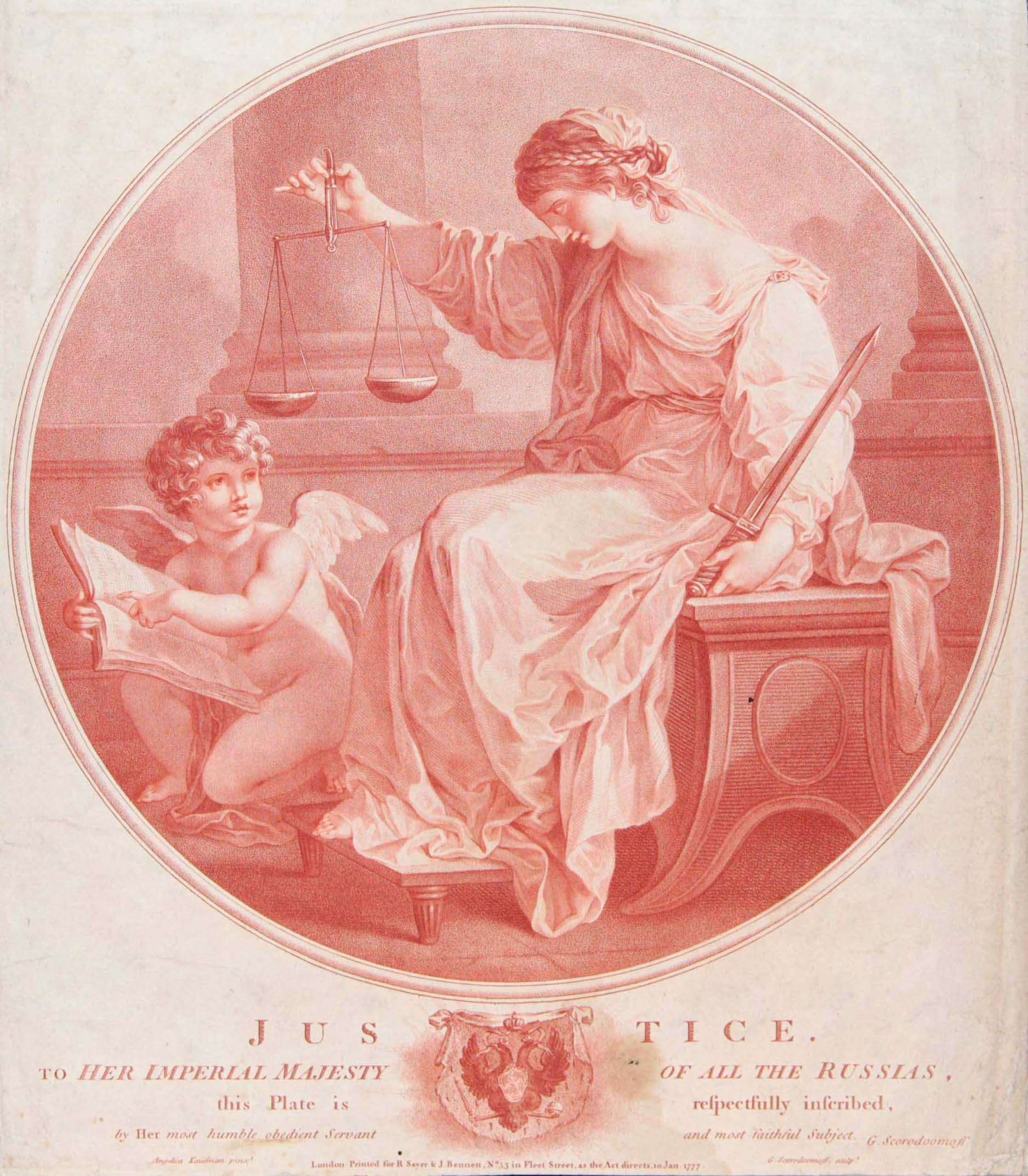
Justice, after Angelica Kauffman, 1777

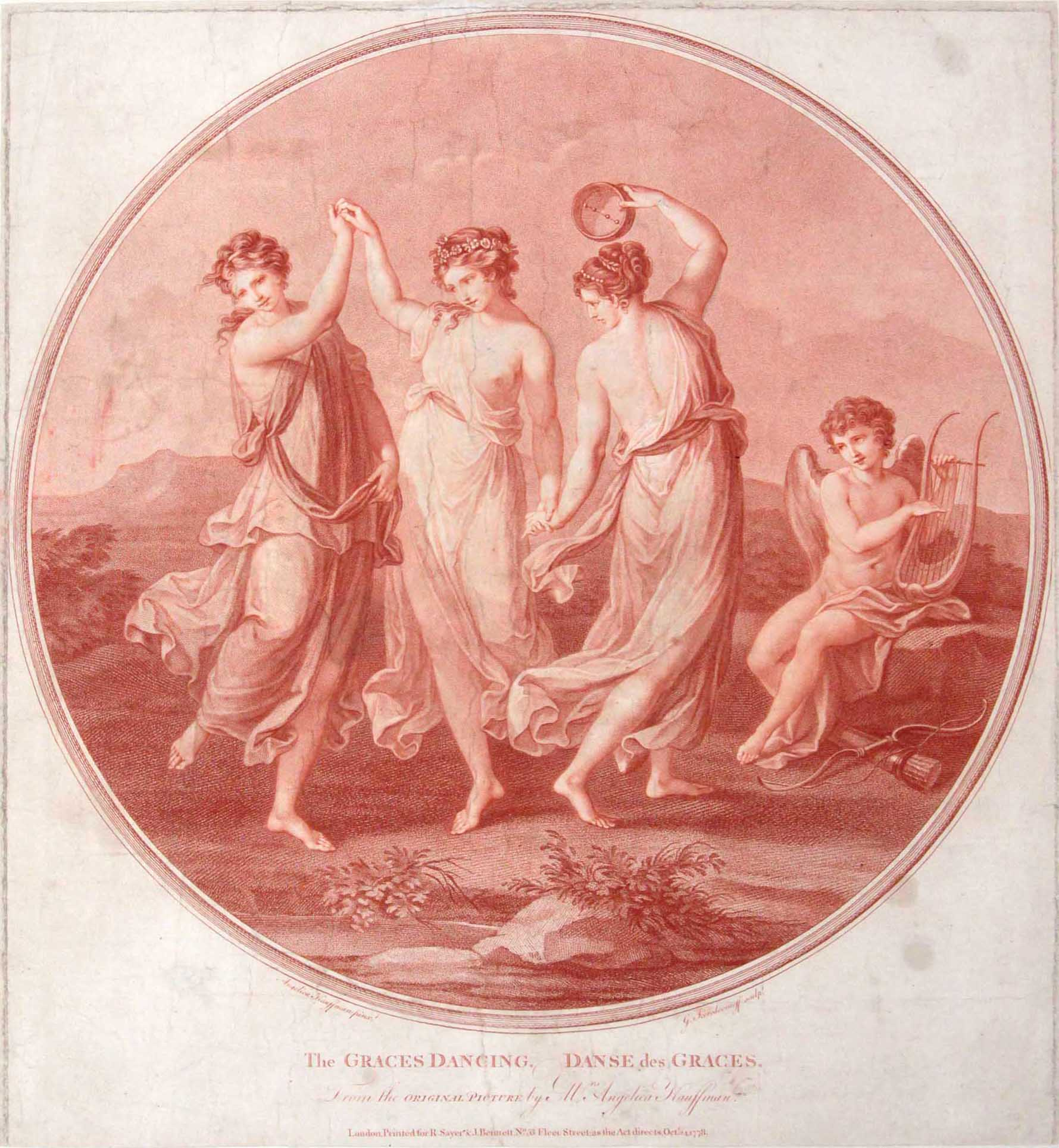
Dance of the Graces, after Angelica Kauffman, 1778

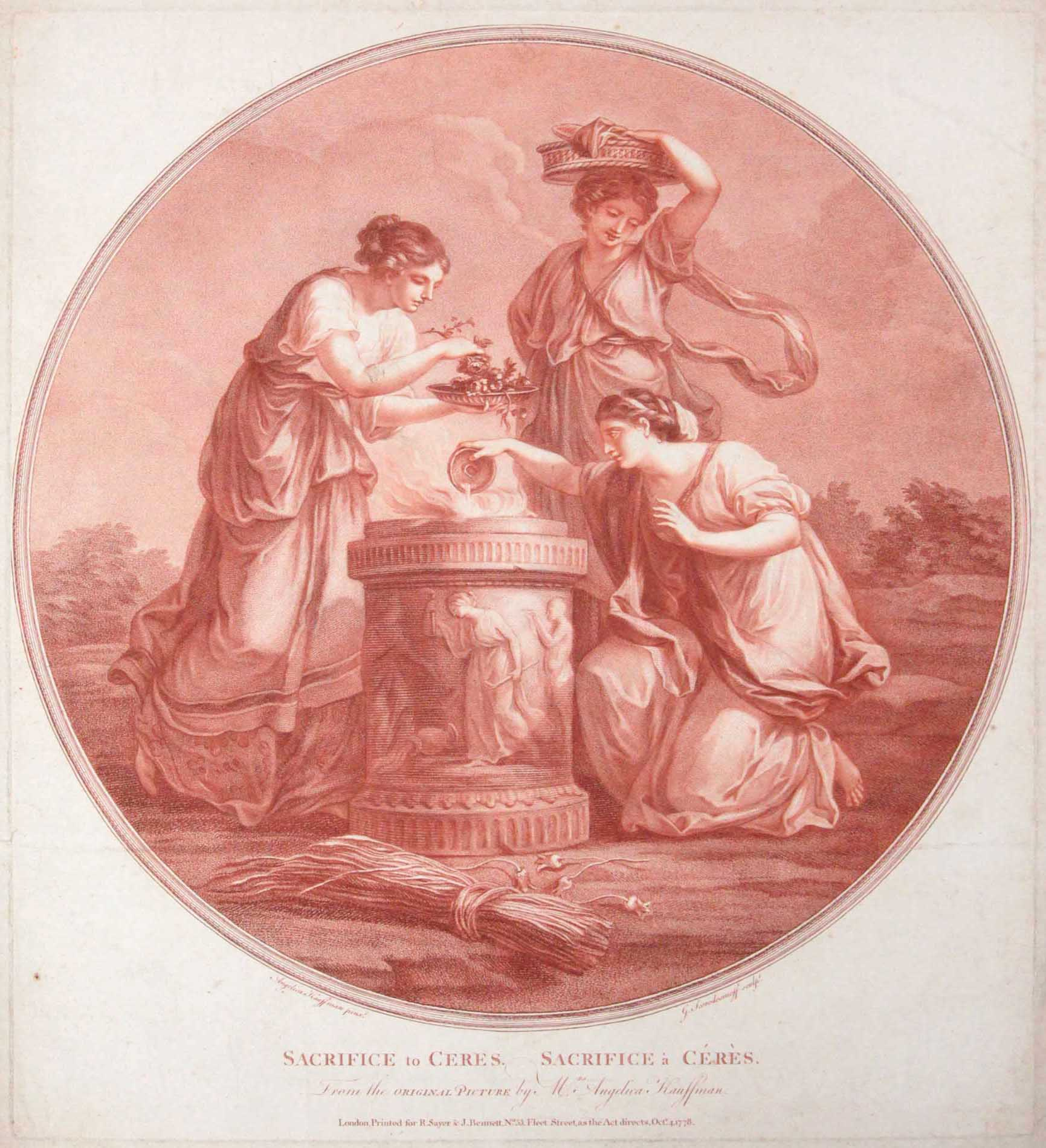
Sacrifice to Ceres, after Angelica Kauffman, 1778

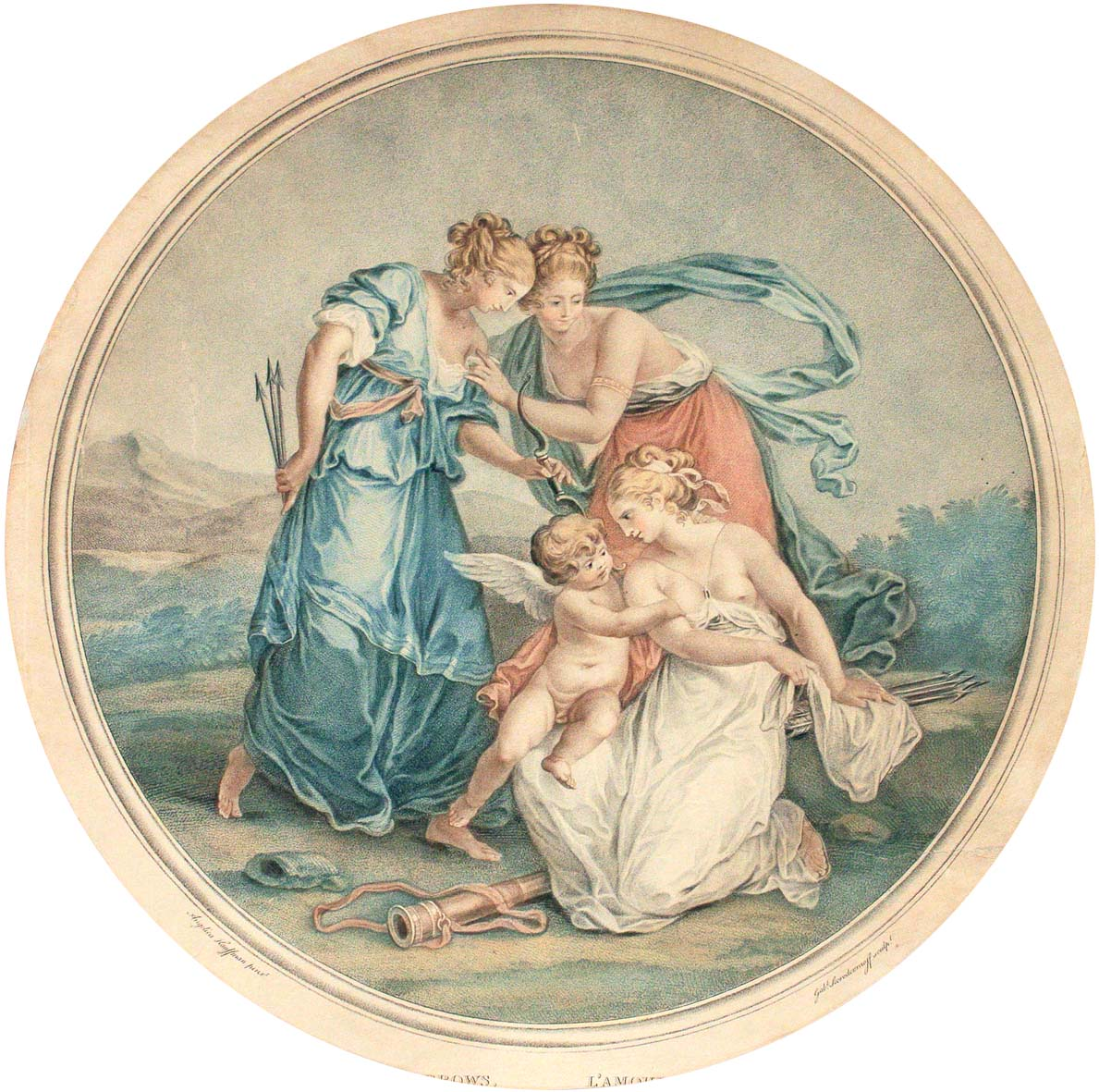
Cupid Trying to Get Back His Arrows, after Angelica Kauffman, 1777

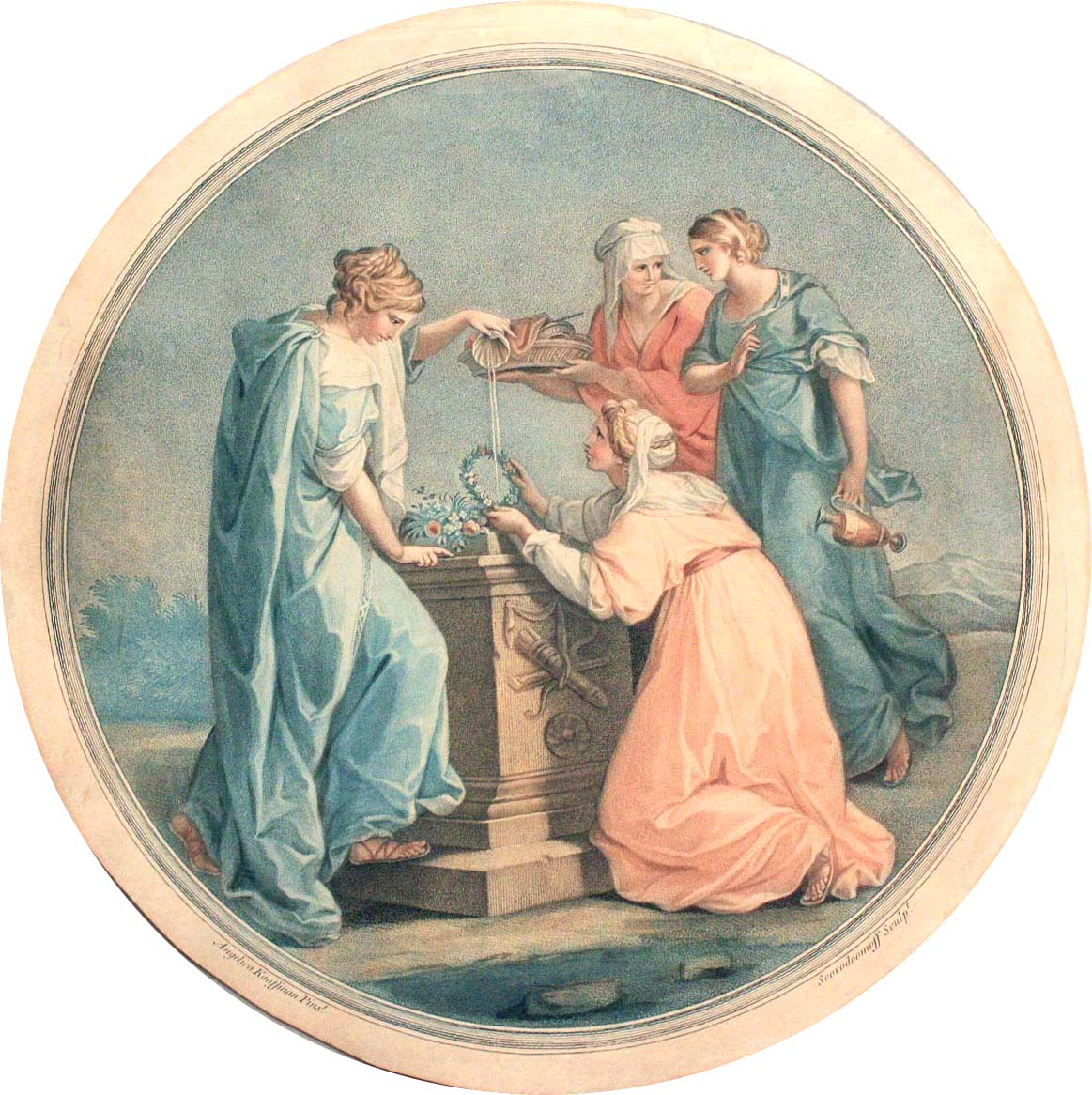
Sacrifice to Cupid, after Angelica Kauffman, 1778

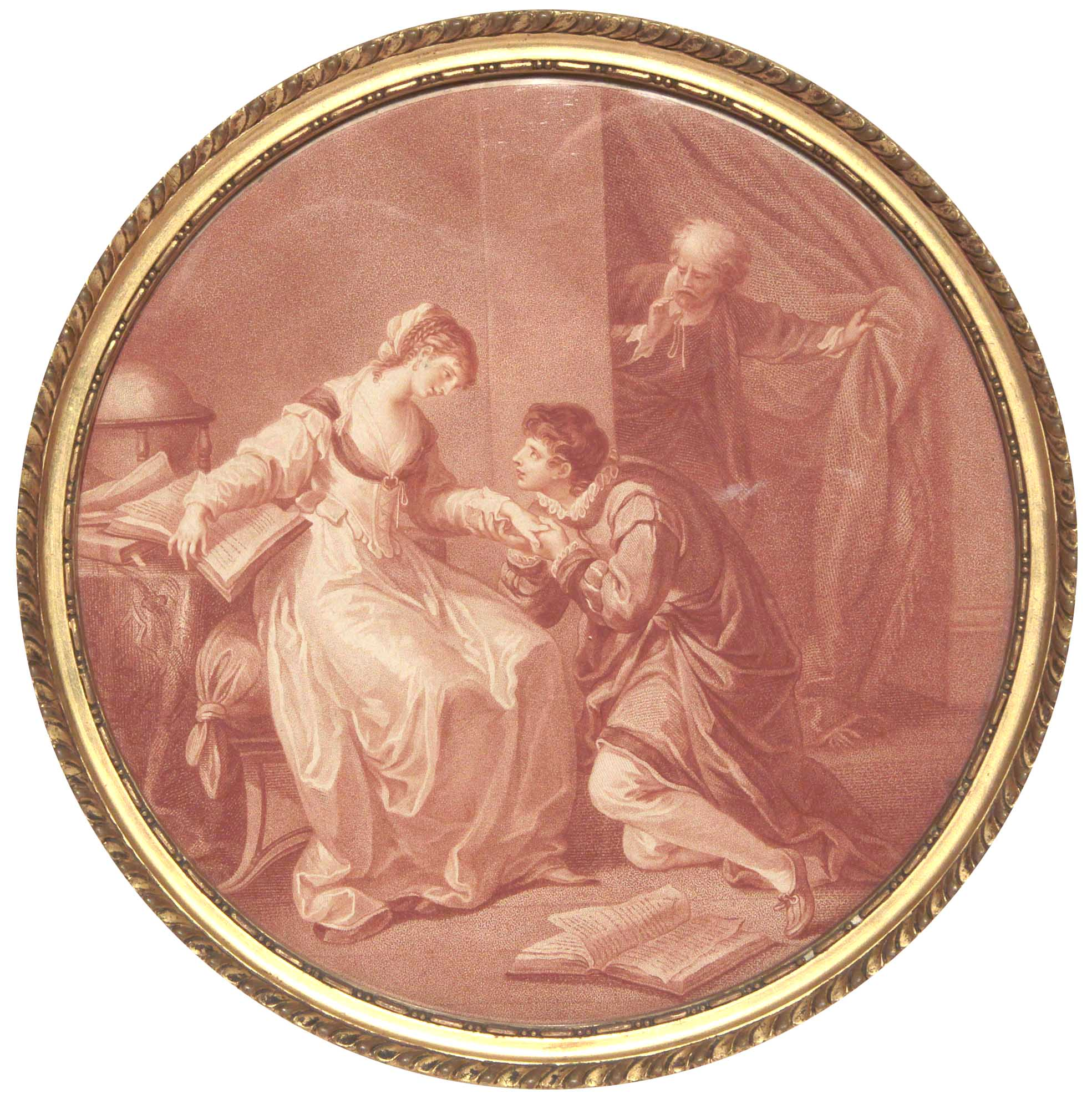
Abelard and Eloise Surprised by Fulbert, after Angelica Kauffman, 1778

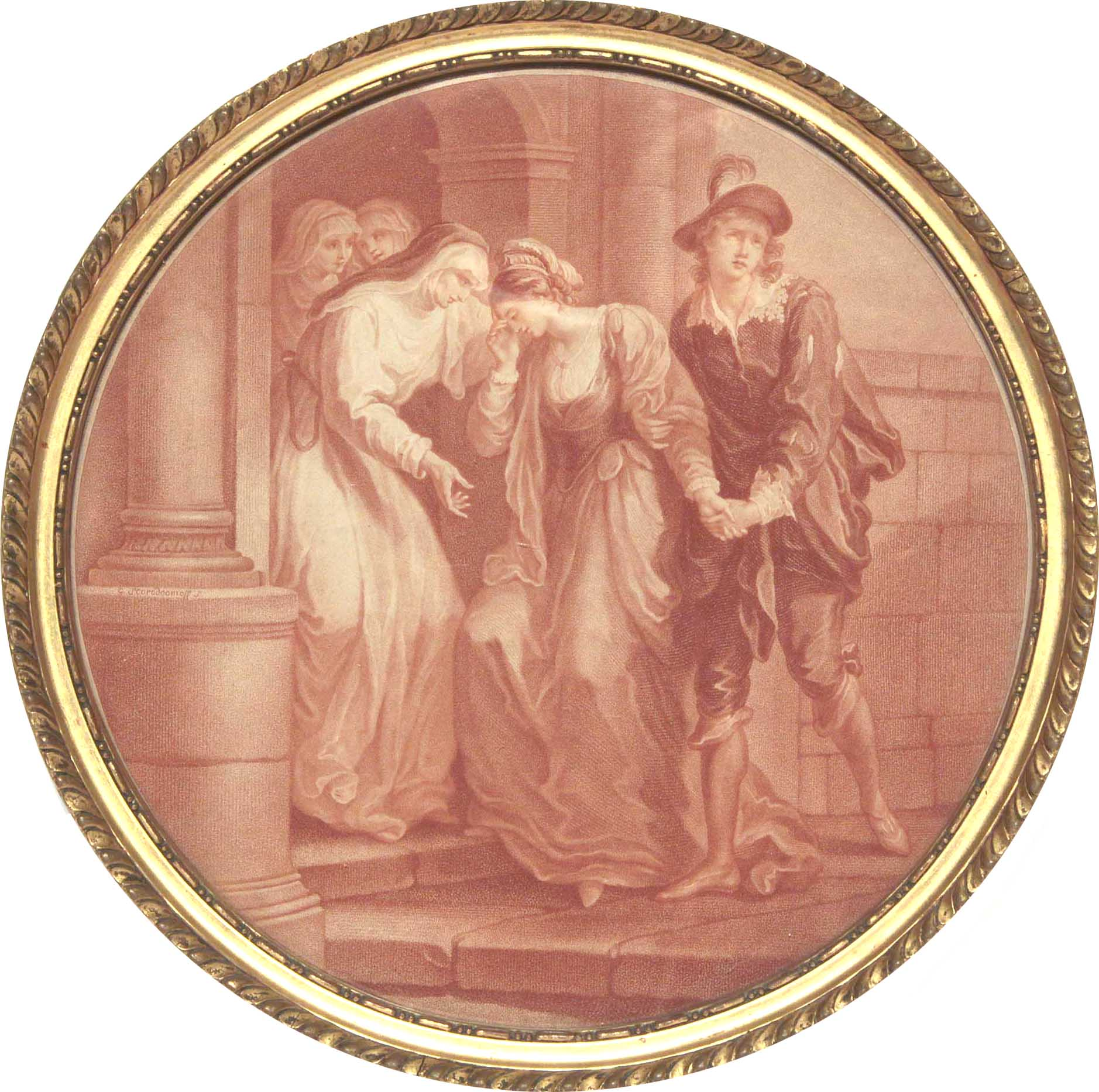
The Parting of Abelard and Eloise, after Angelica Kauffman, 1780

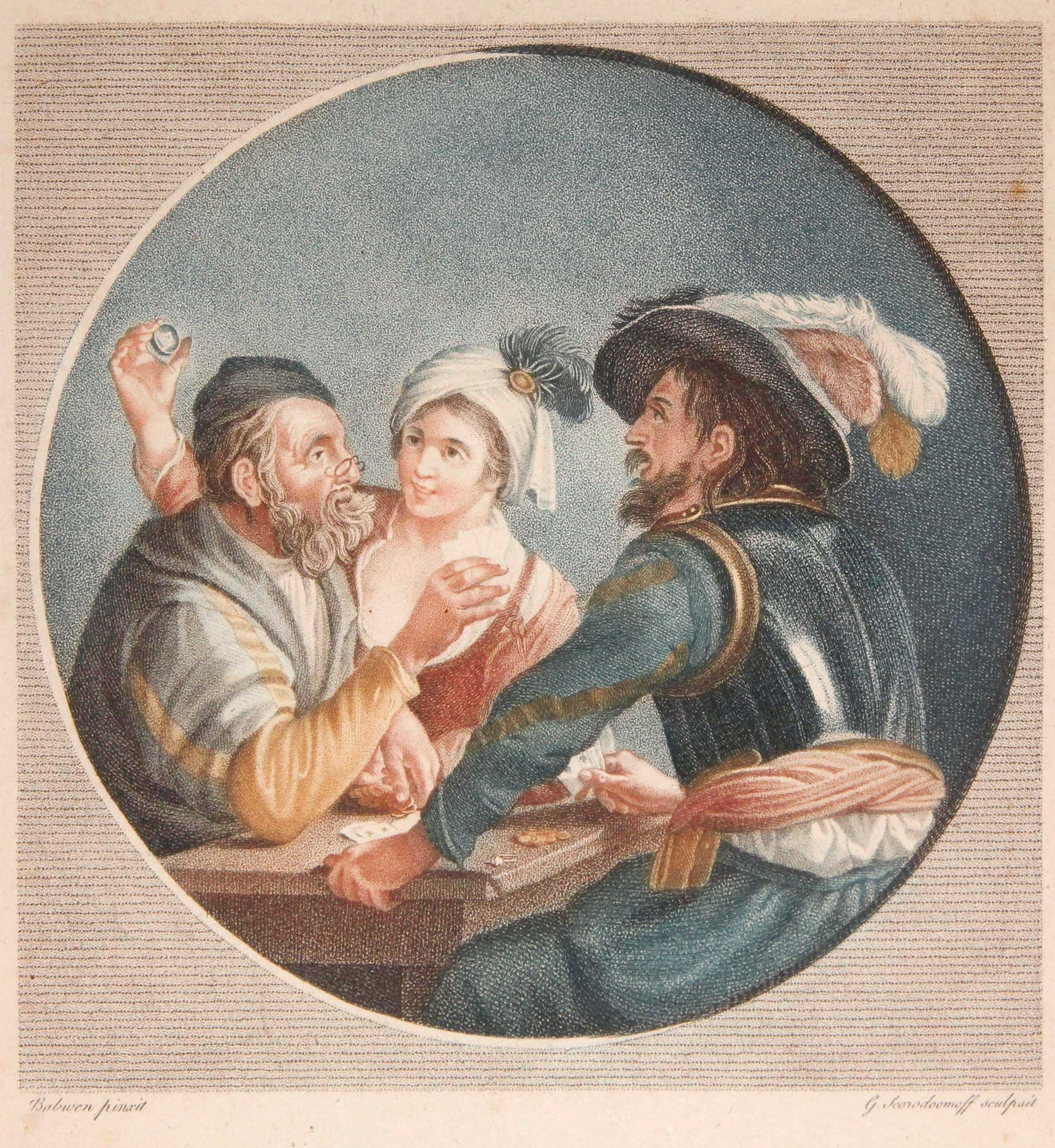
Gamblers, after Dirck van Baburen, 1778

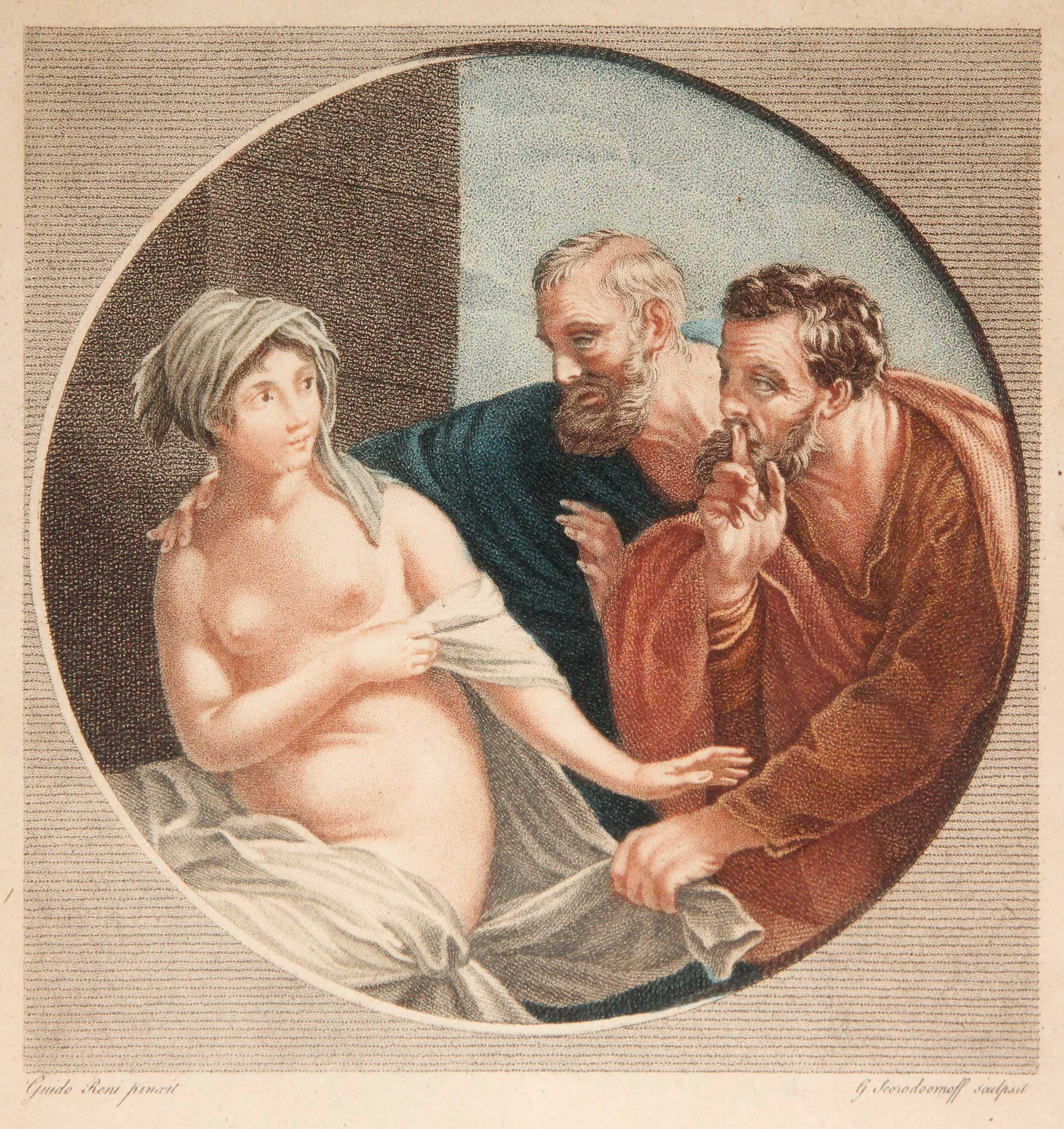
Susanna and the Elders, after Guido Reni, 1779

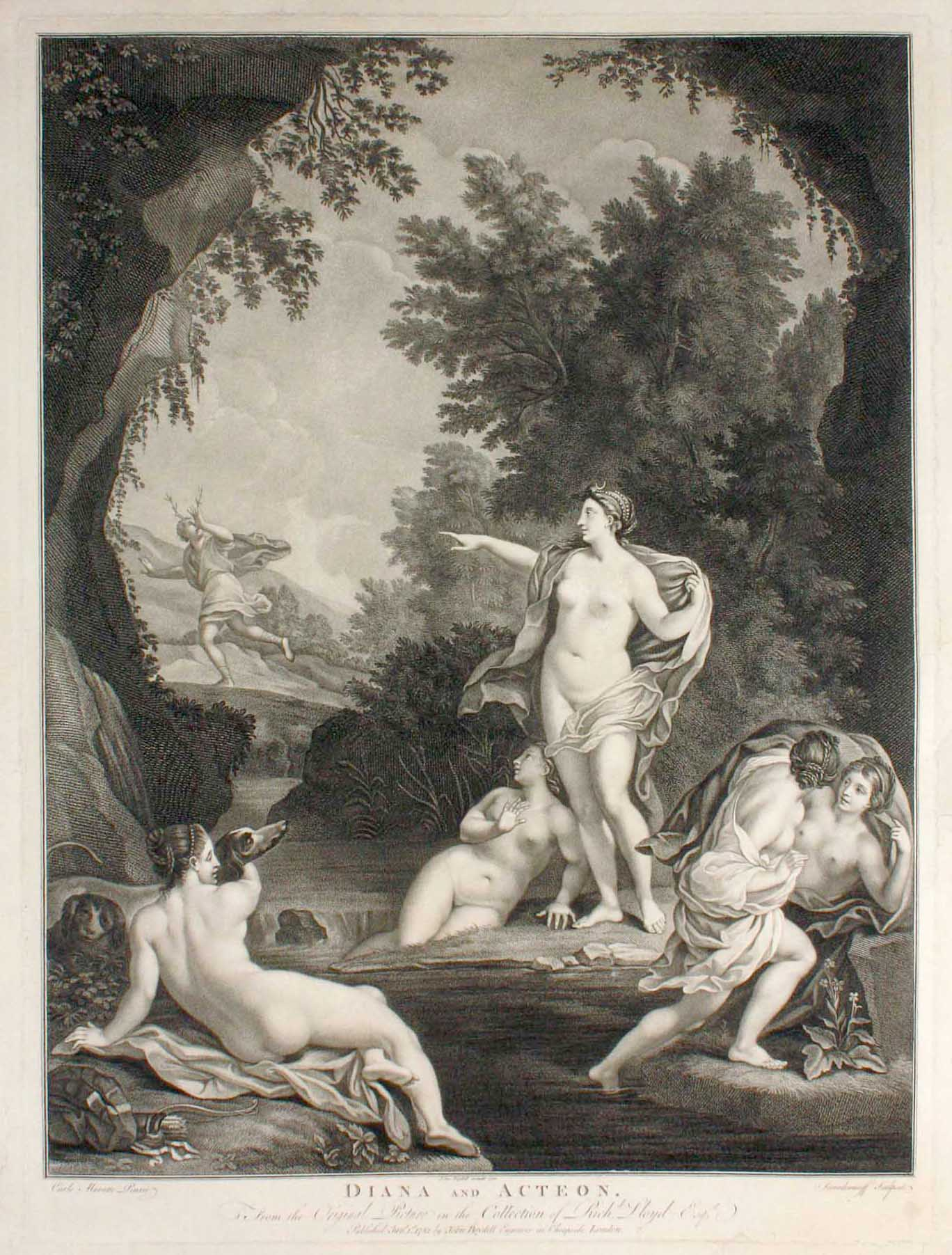
Diana and Actaeon, after Carlo Maratta, 1781
