= Ignaz Sebastian Klauber =

German copper engraver

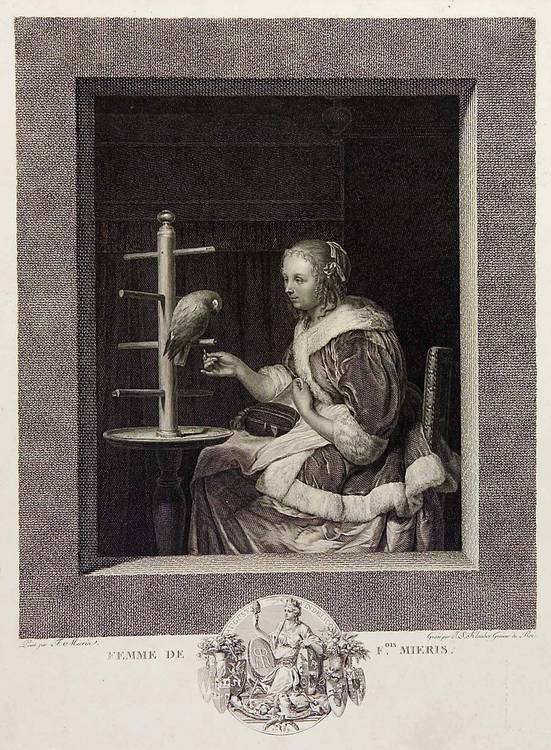
Lady with a Parrot, after Frans van Mieris the Elder

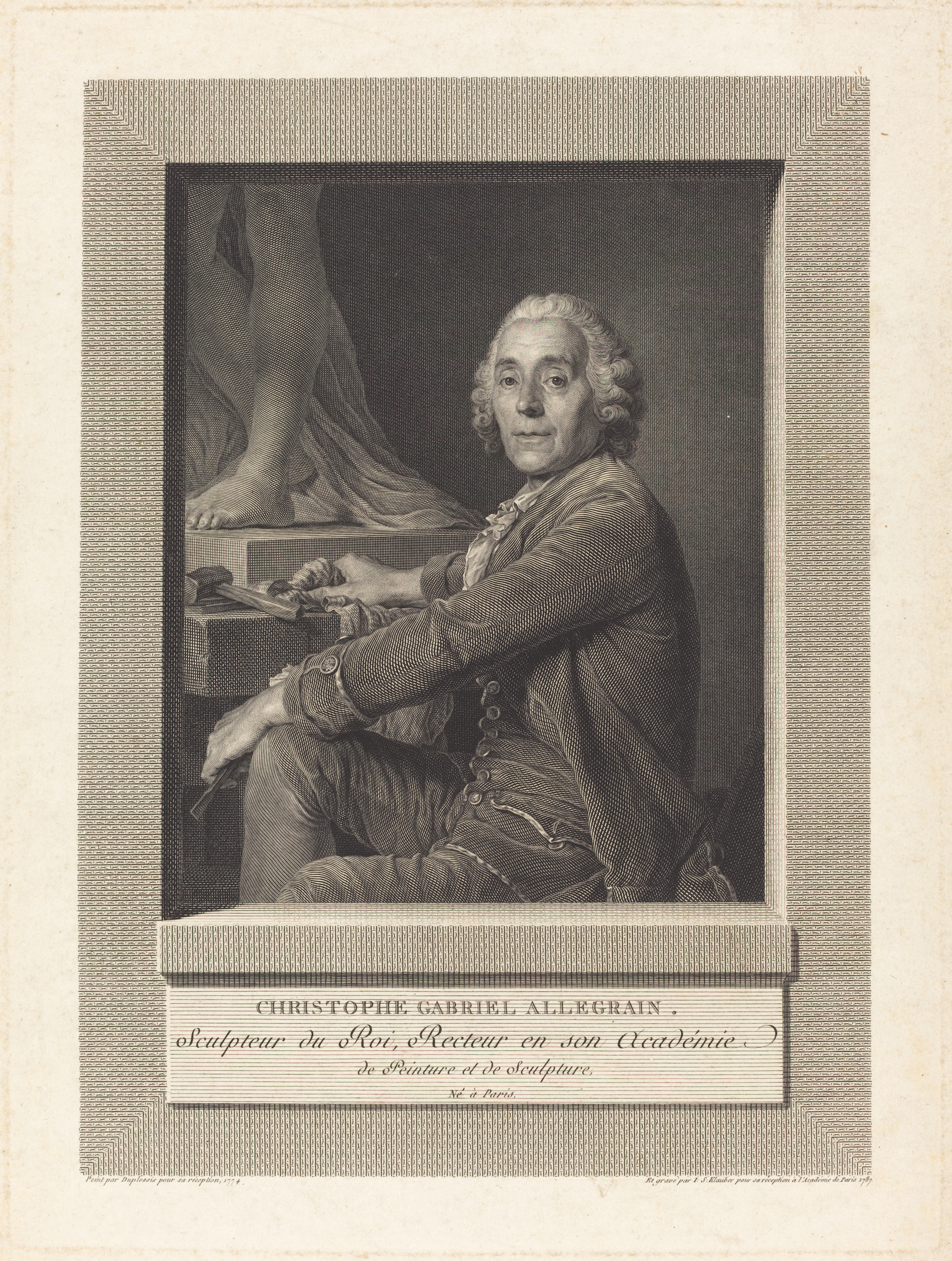
Christophe-Gabriel Allegrain, after Joseph Duplessis

Ignaz Sebastian Klauber (Russian: Игнац Себастьян Клаубер; 2 January 1753 – 25 May 1817) was a German copper engraver, who spent an important part of his career in Russia.

== Biography ==
He was the best-known member of the Klauber family of engravers; born to Johann Baptist Klauber (c. 1712 – c. 1787), a court engraver in Augsburg. He received his initial training from his father, then spent many years in Rome. In 1781, he went to Paris, where he improved his skills studying with Johann Georg Wille. Later, he was admitted to the Académie royale de peinture et de sculpture, and was named a court engraver. The French Revolution forced him to return to Augsburg in 1790. From there, he went to Nuremberg, where he worked for the art publishing house of Johann Friedrich Frauenholz.

In 1795, he was appointed court engraver to the Elector of Trier, Clemens Wenceslaus of Saxony, and elected a member of the Royal Danish Academy of Fine Arts. The following year, he went to Saint Petersburg, at the invitation of the President of the Imperial Academy of Arts, Count Aleksei Musin-Pushkin, who wished to improve the teaching of engraving at the academy. Although Klauber's initial contract was for only three years, he would remain in Russia for the rest of his life.

In 1797, he was given the official title of Advisor to the academy, and became a member in 1798. One of his major projects involved compiling a catalogue of the engravings transferred to the Imperial Academy from the Załuski Library in Warsaw. From 1805 until his death, he was the Curator for engravings at the Hermitage Museum. Among his last major works are illustrated atlases, depicting the voyages of Adam Johann von Krusenstern and Gavril Sarychev, who explored the coast of Alaska.

His many well-known students included Nikolai Utkin, Andrei Ukhtomsky, Yegor Skotnikov, Stepan Galaktionov, and Konstantin Afanasiev.

== Sources ==
- Britta-R. Schwahn, "Klauber, Ignaz Sebastian", In: Neue Deutsche Biographie, vol. 11, 1977, p. 172 (Online)
- A. I. Somov (1890–1907). "Клаубер, Игнатий-Севастиан". Brockhaus and Efron Encyclopedic Dictionary: In 86 Volumes (82 Volumes and 4 Additional Volumes) (in Russian). St. Petersburg: F. A. Brockhaus.
- Brief biography @ RusArtNet
