= Andrei Ukhtomsky =

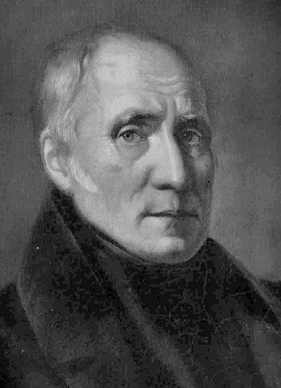
Andrei Ukhtomsky; posthumous portrait, artist unknown

Andrei Grigorievich Ukhtomsky (Russian: Андрей Григорьевич Ухтомский; 17 October 1771, Yaroslavl – 16 February 1852, Saint Petersburg) was a Russian Empire copper engraver.

== Biography ==
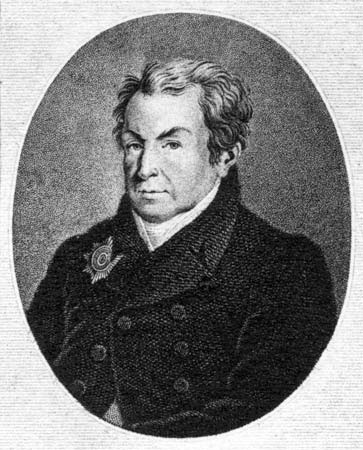
Portrait of Dmitry Khvostov

His father was a priest. He attended the Yaroslavl Theological Seminary, but did not complete his studies; quitting in 1786 to become an under-clerk at the Orphan's Court. He displayed his artistic abilities while there and, in 1795, was allowed to resign his position to attend the Imperial Academy of Arts, where he studied with Ignaz Sebastian Klauber.

In 1798, after receiving several cash awards for his work, he was given a salary of 150 rubles per year, with an apartment, and assigned students. The following year, he was placed in charge of the landscape engraving class. He graduated in 1800, with the title of "Artist", and was appointed to engrave cityscapes of Saint Petersburg, originally painted by Semyon Shchedrin

Soon, his works were in great demand and fetching high prices. In 1804, one of a statue of Apollo brought in 75 rubles. By 1807, a view of the Kamenny Islands earned him an estimated 400 rubles. He began specializing in portraits, for which he was awarded the title of "Academician" in 1808, and he was named manager of the academy's printing house in 1815. From then until 1817 he taught at the academy, but his vision grew weak, and he was appointed to the library instead. In 1818 his son Konstantin was born. He would become a well-known painter of interior scenes.

In 1821, he was presented with the Demidov Medal for inventing an engraving machine. He was also given 2,000 rubles to develop his device further, and make improvements. It was never put into widespread practical use.

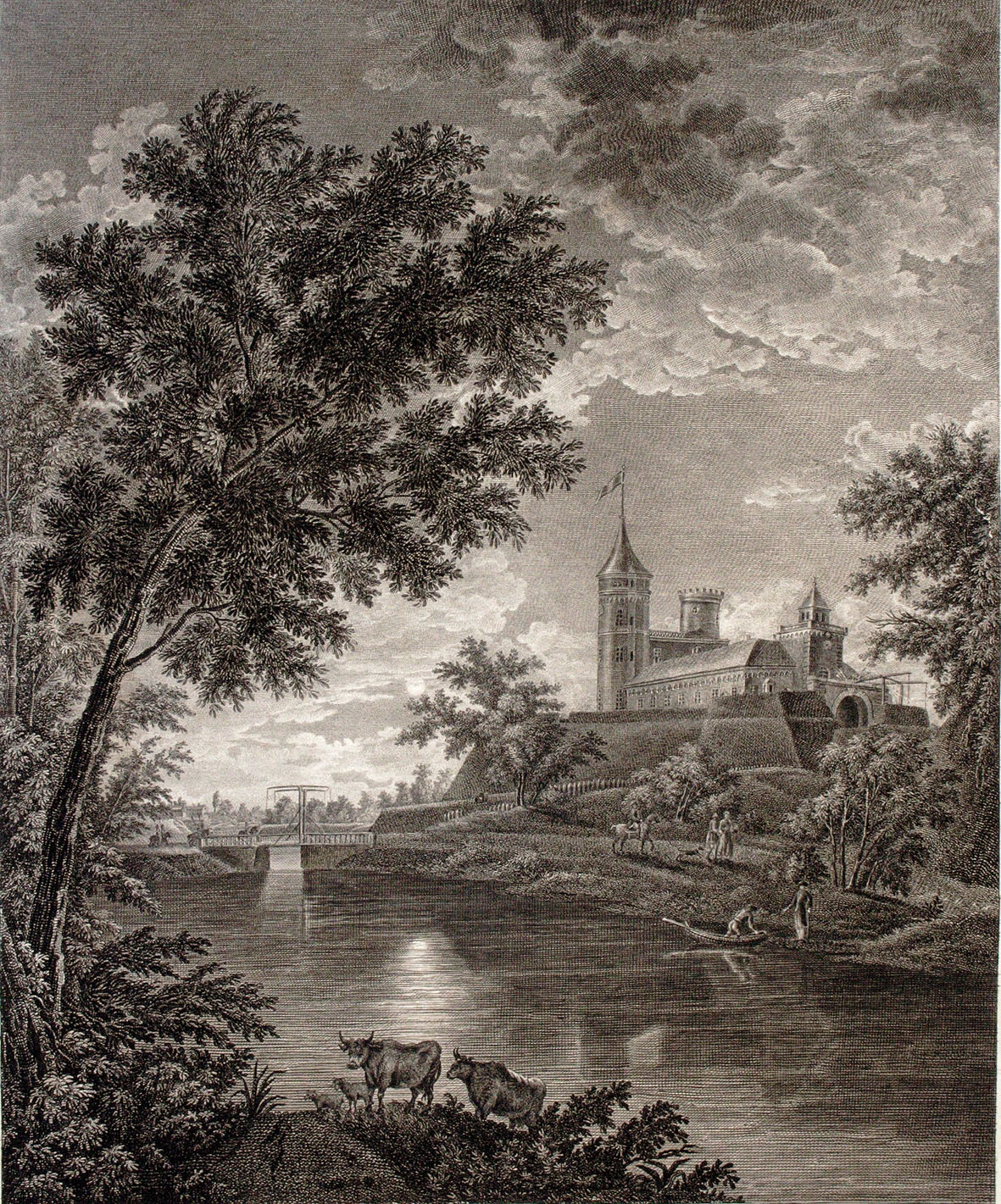
The fortress of Pavlovsk, in the moonlight

He was appointed curator of the academy's museum in 1831, and received a diamond ring in 1834, as a reward for his work. In 840, he was commissioned to make a large series of engravings, depicting the travels of Admiral Vasily Golovnin. He was granted the rank of court councillor in 1843.

In 1850, he was retired, with a pension. He died two years later and was interred at Smolensky Cemetery. Although he created over 186 works, in a variety of genres, he is best remembered for his portraits.

== Sources ==
- Biography from the Brockhaus and Efron Encyclopedic Dictionary, St. Petersburg. 1890–1907 @ Russian Wikisource.
- Biography by S. N. Kondakov, In: Anniversary reference book of the Imperial Academy of Arts. 1764-1914, Vol.2, Golike & Vilborg, 1915
- Biography and works @ Staratel
