= Antoine Radigues =

French engraver and medallist (1721–1809)

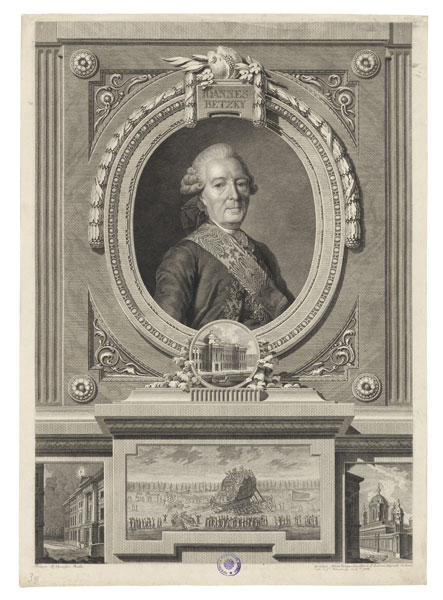
Portrait of Ivan Betskoy

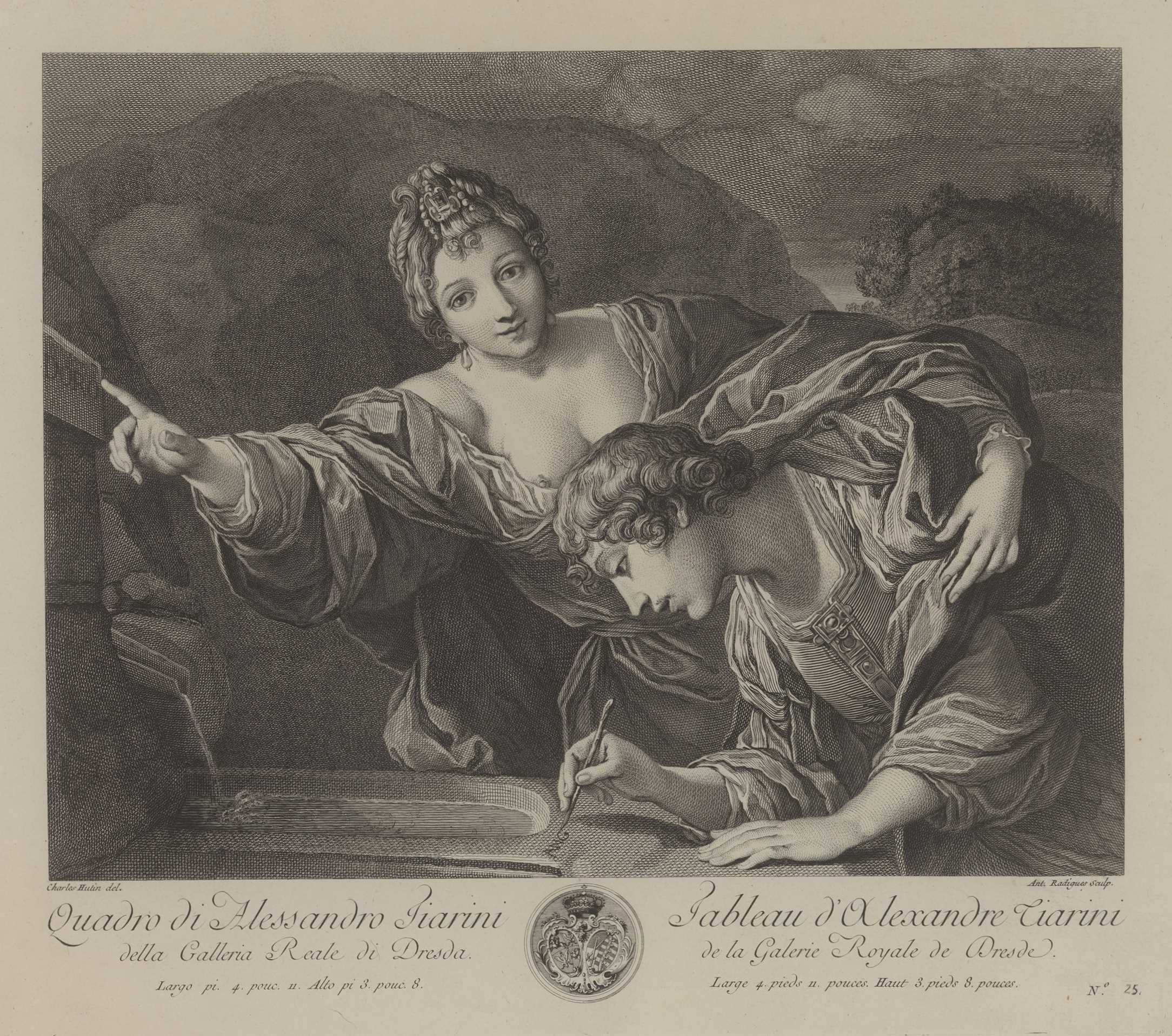
Angelica and Medoro, from Orlando Furioso, after Alessandro Tiarini

Antoine-Christophe Radigues (Russian: Антон Яковлевич Радиг, romanized: Anton Yakovlevich Radig; 7 November 1721, Reims – 20 July 1809, Saint Petersburg) was a French engraver and medallist who spent much of his career in Russia.

== Biography ==
His father, Jacques Radigues, was also an engraver, and probably gave Antoine his first lessons before he pursued formal studies in Paris. During the 1750s, he travelled extensively, to Holland, England and Germany. Some of his first engravings were illustrations for the fables of La Fontaine. He was invited to Russia in 1764, to teach at the Russian Academy of Sciences; replacing Georg Friedrich Schmidt, who had resigned following the death of his patroness, Empress Elizabeth.

His first major assignment involved creating thirty images for a burial album of the Empress; a project that occupied him for three years and almost cost him his sight. It was left incomplete, and never published, by official orders. This may have been due to the fact that, since 1765, he had been teaching at the Imperial Academy of Arts, as well as the Academy of Sciences; something which caused displeasure at both institutions. This came to a head in 1769, and he was dismissed from his positions.

He chose to remain in Saint Petersburg and work as a free-lance engraver. Numerous portraits were commissioned by the Golitsyn and Kurakin families. He also did two portraits of Catherine the Great, based on oil paintings by Vigilius Eriksen.

In 1789, he was allowed to return to the Imperial Academy. He was named an Academician in 1794, for his engraving of Ivan Betskoy, after an oil portrait by Alexander Roslin. He retired in 1795, and was awarded an annual pension. Gavriil Skorodumov and Ivan Bersenev are, perhaps, his best-known students.

His works may be seen at the State Russian Museum, the Hermitage Museum, and the Pushkin Museum, among others.

== Sources ==
- "Radigues, Antoine" from the Russian Biographical Dictionary, 1910
- "Радиг, Антуан". Brockhaus and Efron Encyclopedic Dictionary: In 86 Volumes (82 Volumes and 4 Additional Volumes) (in Russian). St. Petersburg: F. A. Brockhaus. 1890–1907.
- Eduard Konovalov, Новый полный биографический словарь русских художников, Litres, 2017 ISBN 978-5-457-36857-6
