= Stepan Galaktionov =

Russian lithographer, graphic artist and cityscape painter

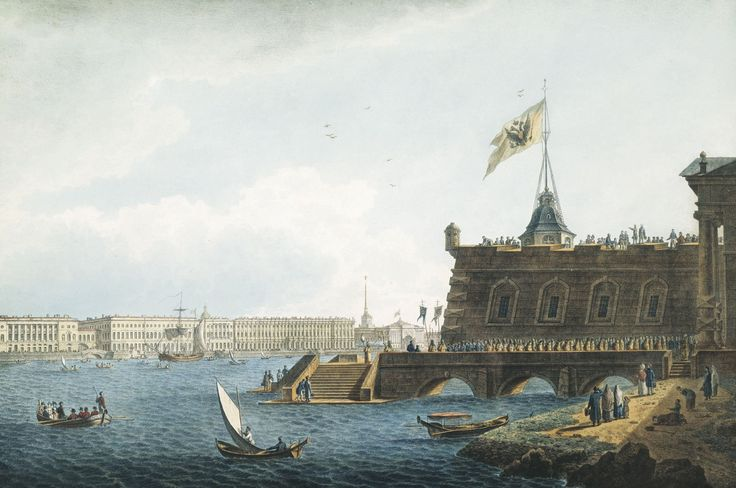
View of the Neva from the Peter and Paul Fortress

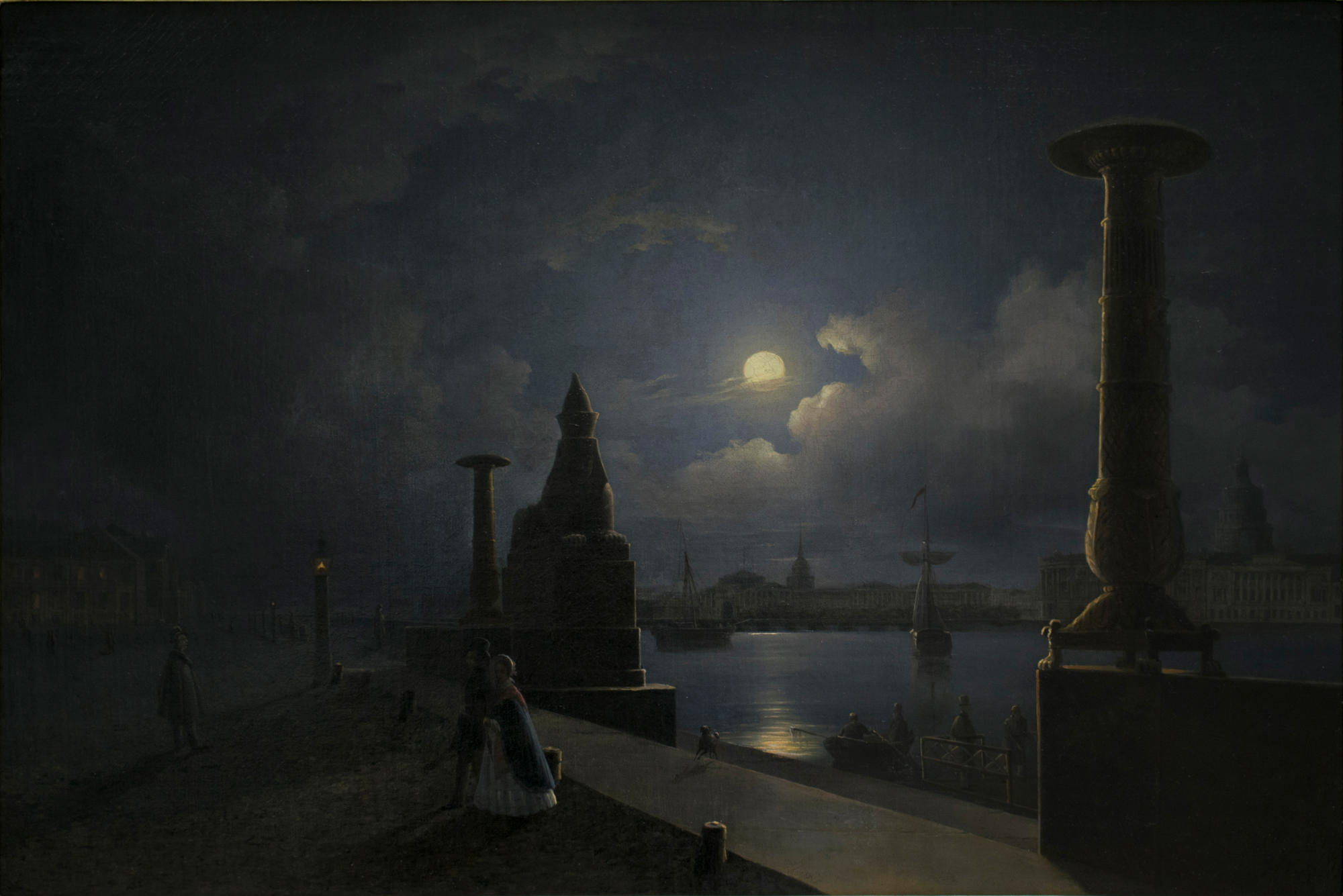
Nighttime View from the Embankment at the Academy of Arts

Stepan Filippovich Galaktionov (Russian: Степан Филиппович Галактионов; 6 July 1779 in Saint Petersburg – 4 December 1854 in Saint Petersburg) was a Russian lithographer, graphic artist, and cityscape painter.

== Biography ==
In 1785, he was admitted to the Imperial Academy of Arts which, at that time, had an elementary school. His teachers included Ignaz Sebastian Klauber, Mikhail Matveevich Ivanov, and Semyon Shchedrin.

He graduated in 1800 with a Certificate of the First Degree. In 1806, he was named an honorary Academician. He later became a full Academician for landscape painting, based on his depiction of the lapidary factory in Peterhof. He was a teacher at the Academy from 1817 until his death. In the 1820s, he was one of the first Russian artists to master lithography.

In 1830, he was promoted to Advisor for landscape engraving. The following year, when that title was abolished, he was designated a Professor, Third Degree. In 1850, he was named an Honored Professor. In addition, he was in the service of the hydrographic depot at Naval Headquarters, where he taught the drawing of marine animals, as well as engraving and lithography.

In addition to teaching, he created vignettes for several almanacs and magazines, and provided illustrations for the works of many contemporary authors, such as Ivan Krylov and Alexander Pushkin. As was common practice at the time, most of his engravings were based on other artists' paintings and drawings, but he also created original works.

He was married to the daughter of a wealthy archpriest in Smolensk. They had three daughters, one of whom (Anna), married the medallist, Pavel Utkin.

== Sources ==
- "Галактионов, Степан Филиппович". Brockhaus and Efron Encyclopedic Dictionary: In 86 Volumes (82 Volumes and 4 Additional Volumes) (in Russian). St. Petersburg: F. A. Brockhaus. 1890–1907.
- Biography from the Russian Biographical Dictionary @ Russian Wikisource
- S. N. Kondakov (1915). Юбилейный справочник Императорской Академии художеств. 1764-1914. Vol. 2. R. Golike and I. A. Viliborg (Eds.). p. 45.
- Mikhail Babenchikov, Русская гравюра. С.Ф. Галактионов, Moscow, 1951 (Ozon)
