= Johann Stenglin =

German-born Russian mezzotint engraver

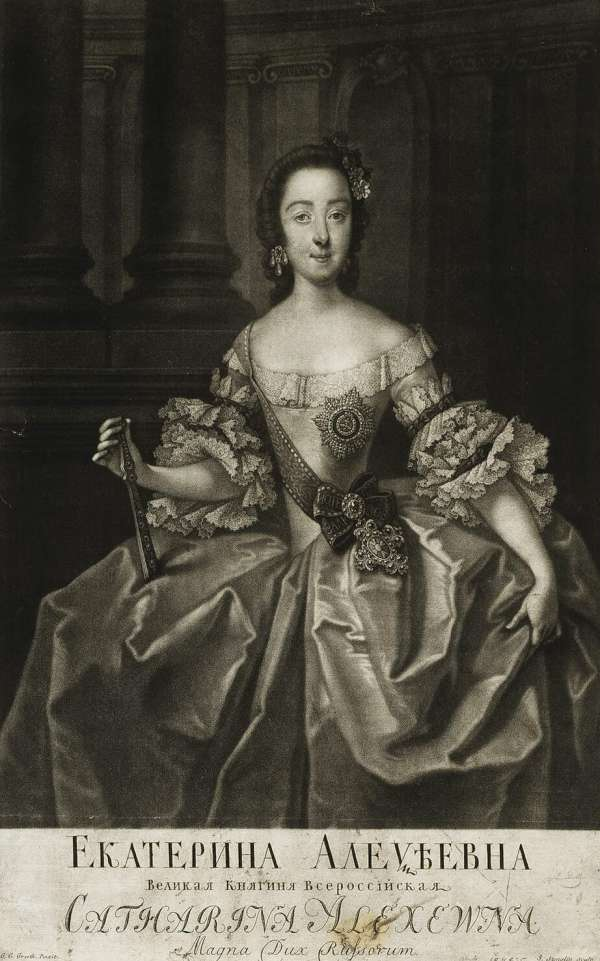
Grand Duchess (later Empress) Catherine Alexeyevna (1745)

Johann Stenglin, russified as Ivan Stenglin (Russian: Иван Штенглин; c. 1710, Augsburg — c. 1777, St. Petersburg), was a German-born Russian mezzotint engraver.

== Biography ==
He was born to the family of a wealthy burgher. His first studies in engraving were with Gabriel Bodenehr. Little more is known of him until 1741, when he accepted an invitation from the engraver and cartographer Jacob von Staehlin to come to St. Petersburg and work at the newly established art department of the Russian Academy of Sciences. The first works he created there (mezzotints of Russian rulers) are now considered to be very crude. He was forced to leave the Academy in 1744, following some serious disagreements with its director, Johann Daniel Schumacher, but was able to make a living as a freelance artist.

Around 1750, due to continued misunderstandings with the academic authorities, he left St. Petersburg for Moscow, where he painted portrait miniatures and lived in extreme poverty. In 1763 his old patron, Staehlin, found him and was able to obtain a room for him at the estate of the former Grand Chancellor, Alexey Bestuzhev-Ryumin. There, he once again produced engravings. When he had become reestablished, in 1765, Staehlin invited him back to St. Petersburg, where he taught mezzotinting at the now independent Imperial Academy of Arts.

Most of his engravings are portraits; including those of Staehlin; the Danish Ambassador, Andreas Schumacher; the mathematician, Leonhard Euler; and the French adventurer, Jean Armand de Lestocq. Many of his original plates were purchased by the Academy or acquired by the collector, Dmitry Rovinsky. The Chancellery of the Academy of Sciences possesses eleven of his engravings of the Aurora Borealis over St. Petersburg, from sketches by Mikhail Lomonosov.

== Sources ==
- Bénézit, Emmanuel (2006) [first published in French in 1911–1923]. Benezit Dictionary of Artists. Vol. 13. Paris: Gründ. pp. 317. ISBN 2-7000-3083-4 – via the Internet Archive.
- Hind, Arthur M. (1963). A History of Engraving & Etching from the 15th Century to the Year 1914 (3rd, fully rev. ed.). New York: Dover. pp. 392. OCLC 1035610203 – via the Internet Archive.
- Lieb, Norbert [in German] (1937). "Stenglin, Johann". In Vollmer, Hans (ed.). Allgemeines Lexikon der bildenden Künstler (in German). Vol. 31. Leipzig: E. A. Seemann. p. 592. OCLC 162257197.
- Malinovskiy, K. V. (2007). Художественные связи Германии и Санкт-Петербурга в ХVIII веке (in Russian). Saint Petersburg: Kriga. pp. 277, 355–359, 433, 448, 455. ISBN 978-5-90180530-5.
- Markina, L. A. (1999). Портретист Георг Христоф Гроот и немецкие живописцы в России середины XVIII века (in Russian). Moscow: Pamyatniki istoricheskoy mysli. ISBN 5-88451-069-1. OCLC 42910094.
- Nagler, Georg Kaspar (1847). "Stenglin, Johann". Neues Allgemeines Künstler-Lexicon (in German). Vol. 17. München: E. A. Fleischmann. p. 323 – via Google Books.
- Rovinsky, D. A. (1895). Подробный словарь русских граверов XVI—XIX вв (in Russian). Vol. 2. Saint Petersburg: Imperial Academy of Sciences. cols. 1211–1219.
- Staehlin, Jacob von [in German] (1990). Malinovsky, K. V. (ed.). Записки Якоба Штелина об изящных искусствах в России (in Russian). Moscow: Iskusstvo. ISBN 5-210-00147-4.
- Wax, Carol (1990). The Mezzotint: History and Technique. New York: H. N. Abrams. p. 91. ISBN 0-8109-3603-8. OCLC 556199574.
