= Aleksei Musin-Pushkin =

Russian manuscript collector (1744–1817)

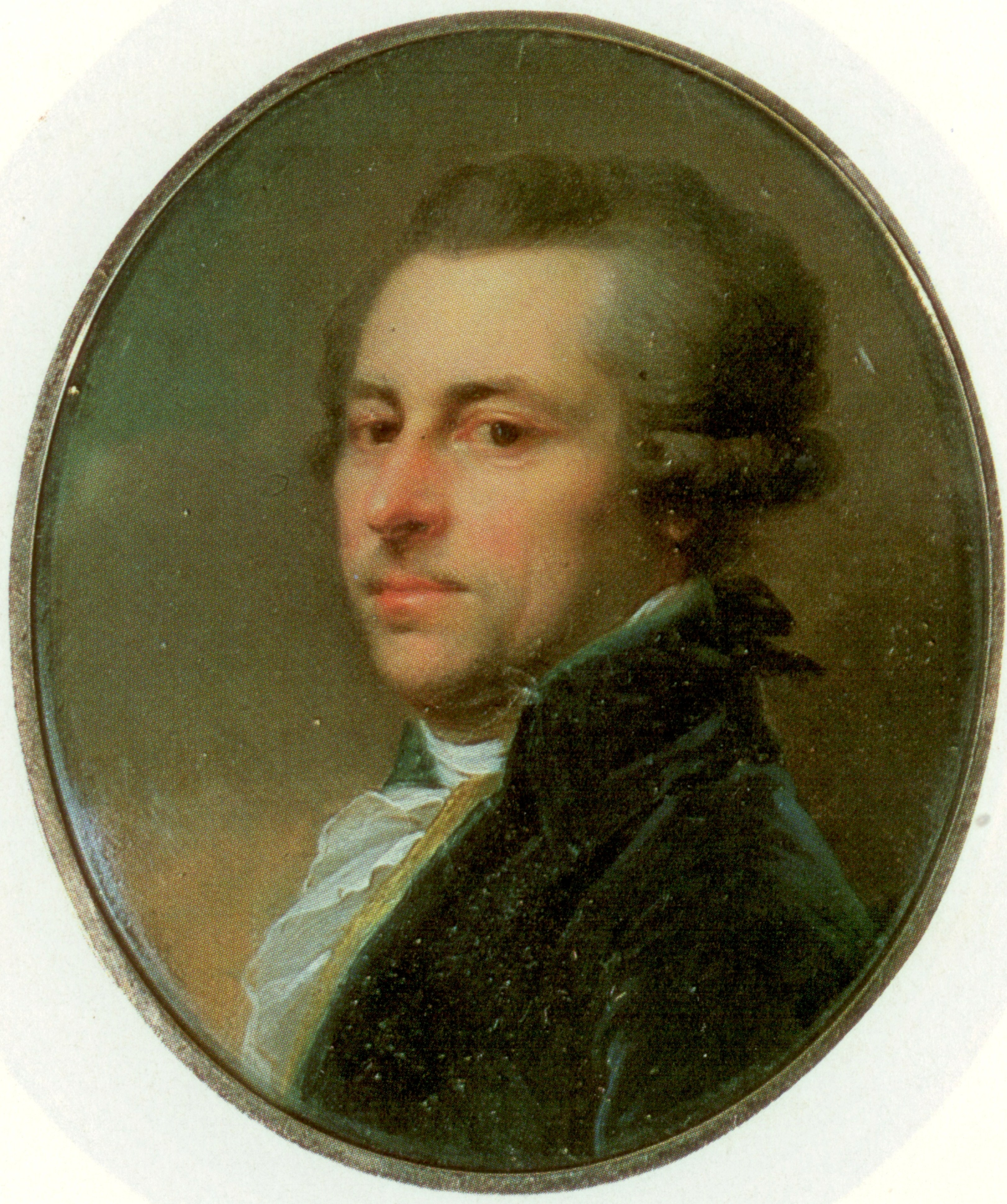
Aleksei Musin-Pushkin, portrait miniature by Johann Baptist von Lampi the Elder (1792)

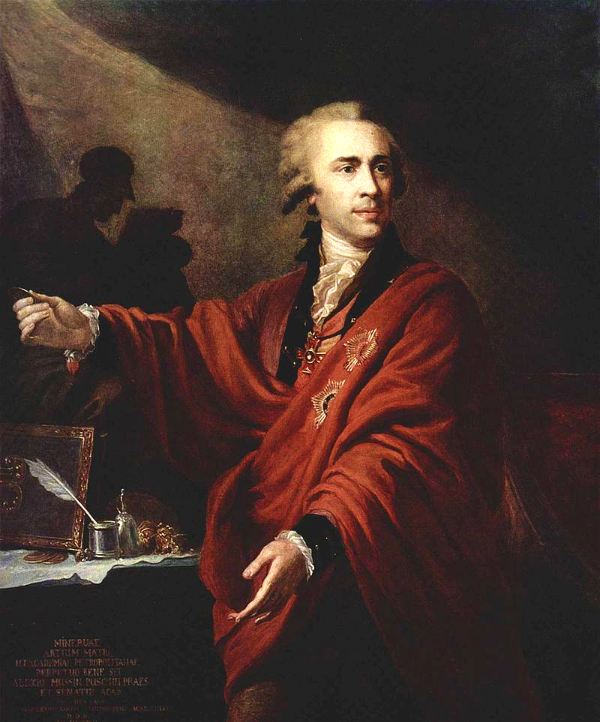
Aleksei Ivanovich Musin-Pushkin, by Johann Baptist Lampi the Elder (1794)

Aleksei Ivanovich Musin-Pushkin (Russian: Алексей Иванович Мусин-Пушкин; 27 March 1744 – 13 February 1817) was a Russian statesman and historian, known for his large art and book collections. He is credited with discovering the only known manuscript of The Tale of Igor's Campaign in 1795.

== Biography ==
Musin-Pushkin was born to Ivan Yakovlevich Musin-Pushkin (1710–1799), a Guard Captain, and his wife, Natalia Mikhailovna, née Priklonskaya in Moscow in 1744. He graduated from the artillery school in Saint Petersburg, then served as the Adjutant to General Grigory Orlov. In 1772, when the General was discharged, at his own request, for health reasons, Musin-Pushkin went on an extended tour of Europe; visiting Germany, France, the Netherlands, Italy, Switzerland, and England. When he returned in 1775, he was appointed a Master of Ceremonies at the Imperial Court. In 1781, he married Ekaterina Wolkonskaya (1754–1829), daughter of Major-General Alexei Wolkonski. They had three sons and five daughters.

In 1785, he became an honorary member of the Imperial Academy of Arts; elevated to full member in 1789. As an avid collector of historical memorabilia, he made a major acquisition in 1791; a large part of the Kryokshin Archives, with documents from the reign of Peter the Great and Medieval manuscripts; including the Nikon Chronicle, as well as maps from the 16th and 17th centuries. Later, he was able to acquire the Laurentian Codex.

That same year, Empress Catherine the Great named him Procuror (representative) for the Holy Synod; charging him with the collection of important documents and manuscripts from churches and monasteries throughout Russia. Local administrators were notified, and he received over 100 items the first year. In 1793, he became a Privy Councilor. Numerous other collections from nobles and scholars were added over the years.

In 1795, following the death of Ivan Betskoy, he succeeded to the position of President of the Imperial Academy. During his tenure, he oversaw the construction of a new building, designed by Alexander Kokorinov and Jean-Baptiste Vallin de la Mothe. He also reorganized the class structure, and sought new sponsors. His professorial appointments were predominantly Russian, rather than German. A notable exception was Ignaz Sebastian Klauber, from Augsburg, who was brought in to head the engraving department. To help with finances, he proposed that students should pay half of the proceeds from the sale of their works to the Academy's treasury, but this was met with too much resistance. Later, he initiated annual exhibitions, with cash prizes from his own salary. In 1796, he was awarded the Order of Saint Alexander Nevsky.

The following year, having been made a Count and Senator, he resigned; settling in Moscow with his book and art collections. In 1807 the historian, Nikolai Bantysh-Kamensky convinced him that his collections should be donated to the Moscow Main Archives, managed by the Collegium of Foreign Affairs. This was never done. As a result, they were destroyed in 1812, during the Great Moscow Fire. Only a few pieces which had been lent or given to other people survived, including the Laurentian Codex, which had been presented to Emperor Alexander I. He attempted to restore the collection, but acquired very little before his death in Moscow in 1817, aged seventy-two.
