= Vladimir and Rogneda =

Painting by Russian artist Anton Losenko

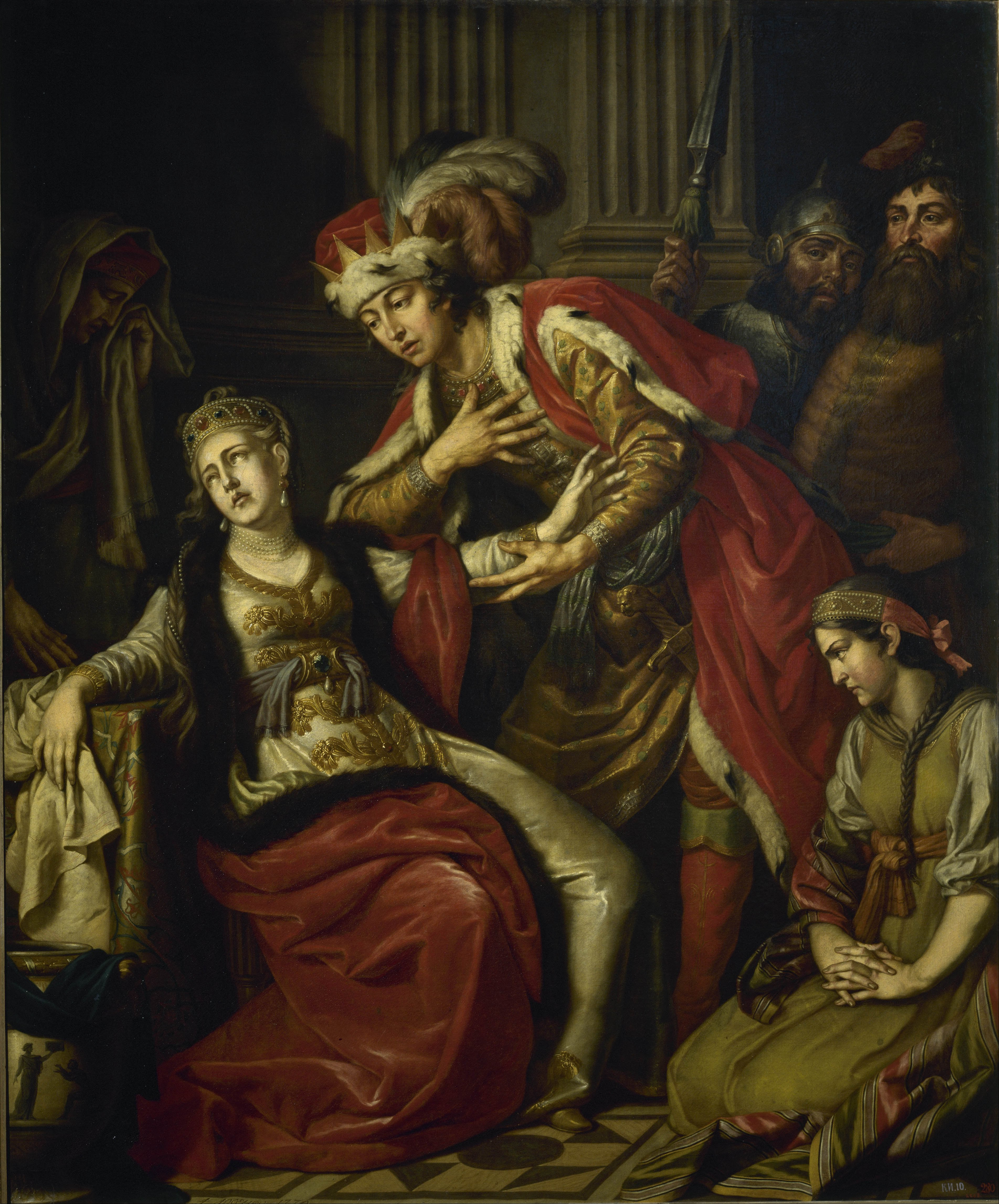
- Artist: Anton Losenko
- Year: 1770
- Medium: Oil on canvas
- Dimensions: 211,5 cm × 177,5 cm (833 in × 699 in)
- Location: State Russian Museum, Saint Petersburg

Vladimir and Rogneda or Vladimir before Rogneda is a painting by Russian artist Anton Losenko (1737-1773), completed in 1770. It is held in the State Russian Museum (Inventory No. Zh-4975) and measures 211.5 × 177.5 cm. The painting's narrative is based on the events of the 10th-century Russian internecine war, as described in the Rus' chronicle. The principal figures are Prince Vladimir Svyatoslavich of Novgorod and Rogneda, daughter of Prince Rogvolod of Polotsk. The action depicted on the canvas is set in Polotsk, in the princely chambers of Rogneda.

Following his return from a long pensioner's trip in 1769, the Imperial Academy of Arts invited Losenko to submit a painting on a theme related to Vladimir and Rogneda in order to be considered for the title of academician. The painting was completed in 1770 and subsequently presented to the public at the academic exhibition that same year. In June 1770, the Council of the Academy of Arts awarded Losenko with the title of Academician, by unanimous decision. Losenko's canvas was among the first paintings on a subject from Russian history.

According to art historian Alexei Savinov, the painting Vladimir and Rogneda was a "new word in Russian painting," and with its completion, Losenko rose "to the first row of Russian artists of the second half of the 18th century." Art historian Avraam Kaganovich wrote that, "for its vivid psychological composition of characters, Losenko's 'Vladimir before Rogneda' became the first piece in the series of Russian historical genre works." According to art historian Nonna Yakovleva, Losenko's canvas was "'destined' for both success and criticism": on one hand, it was a long-anticipated work on a Russian historical theme; on the other, various elements within it raised doubts—particularly the lack of pathos in the main character and the "denseness and flatness of the composition," which conflicted with academic principles.

== History ==
Starting in 1744, Anton Losenko lived in St. Petersburg, where he had been sent to sing in the imperial Court Chapel. After losing his voice in 1753, he was apprenticed to painter Ivan Argunov, and by 1758 he was accepted into the Imperial Academy of Arts, which had been founded the previous year, in 1757. Losenko's mentors included French painters Louis-Joseph Le Lorrain, Jean-Louis de Velly, and Louis-Jean-François Lagrenée, all invited to Russia by Ivan Shuvalov, the Academy’s curator.

In 1760, Losenko was sent to Paris as a pension recipient from the Imperial Academy of Arts, where he honed his skills under the guidance of painter Jean Restout the Younger, who at the time was the director of the Royal Academy of Painting and Sculpture. At the end of 1762, Losenko returned to Russia, presenting his painting The Miraculous Catch of Fish (1762, now in the State Russian Museum) as his progress report. Shortly afterward, his pension was extended, and in 1763 he returned to France, where he remained until 1765, studying under Joseph-Marie Vien. His culminating work during this period was The Sacrifice of Isaac (1765, also now in the State Russian Museum). In late 1765, the Academy Council granted Losenko’s request to extend his pension for another three years, allowing him to relocate from Paris to Rome that December.

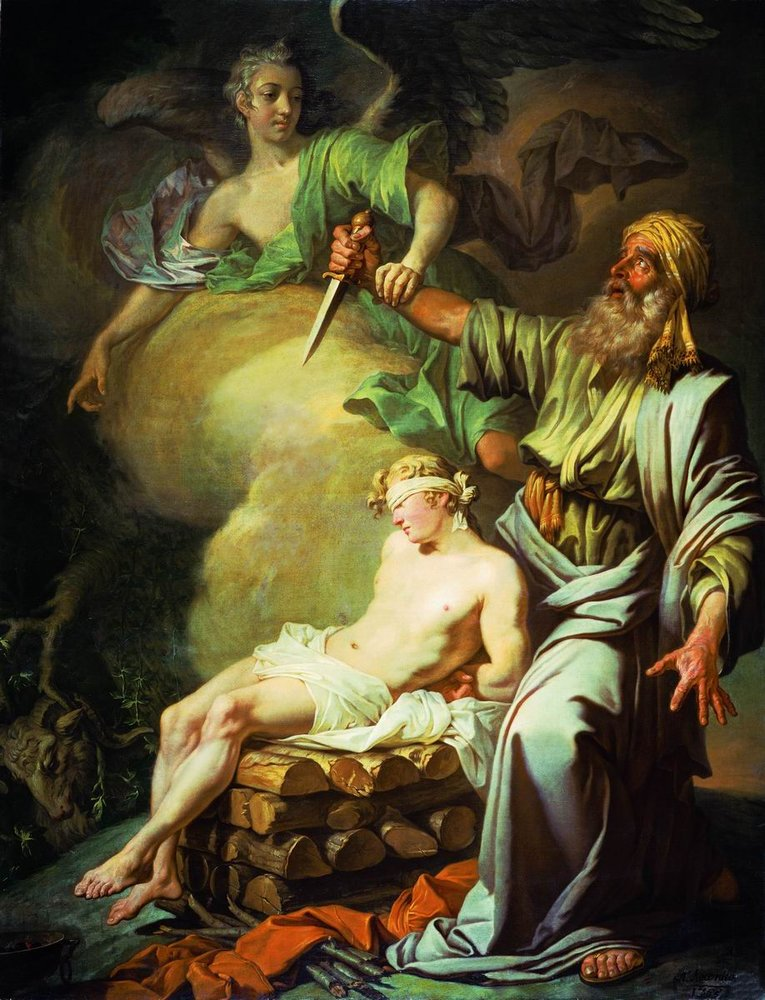
Anton Losenko. The Sacrifice of Isaac (1765, State Russian Museum)

In 1769, Losenko returned permanently to Russia. That same year, for his paintings Abel (1768, now in the Kharkiv Art Museum) and Cain (1768, now in the State Russian Museum), as well as a copy of Raphael's fresco Cardinal and Theological Virtues, the Academy of Arts designated him “appointed academician,” inviting him to paint a new piece to achieve the status of academician. The theme for this new work, assigned on October 4, 1769, (Note: The Julian calendar (‘old style’) is used to date events that took place in the Russian Empire.) was related to 10th-century Russian history, involving Prince Vladimir of Novgorod, Prince Rogvolod of Polotsk, and his daughter, Rogneda. The proposed subject, based on The Tale of Bygone Years and described in Lomonosov’s Ancient Russian History, was formulated as follows: "Vladimir, after securing control over the Novgorod realm, sent an envoy to Rogvolod, Prince of Polotsk, requesting the hand of his daughter Rogneda in marriage; angered by Rogneda’s proud response, Vladimir gathered all his forces, took the capital city of Polotsk by force, took Rogvolod's and his two sons' lives, [and] married the proud Rogneda against her will.”

In the same year, 1769, Losenko commenced work on the painting Vladimir and Rogneda, which was completed in 1770 and became one of the first paintings on a subject from Russian history. In literature, the titles Vladimir before Rogneda and Rogneda when Vladimir Announces to Her the Victory Over Her Father also exist. The painting was unveiled to the public at an academic exhibition held in 1770. The full title of the exhibition was as follows: "Exhibition of the gentlemen members of the Imperial Academy of the three noblest arts of painting, sculpture and architecture, exhibited in the Academic Hall for viewing". Other works by Losenko were showcased, including a reproduction of the frescoes Cardinal and Theological Virtues, Abel and Cain. Additionally, the exhibition included the works of Dmitry Levitzky, Ivan Belsky, Nicolas Delapierre and Georg Christoph Grooth, comprising approximately twenty paintings. It also featured pieces by architects Jean-Baptiste Vallin de la Mothe and Yury Felten.

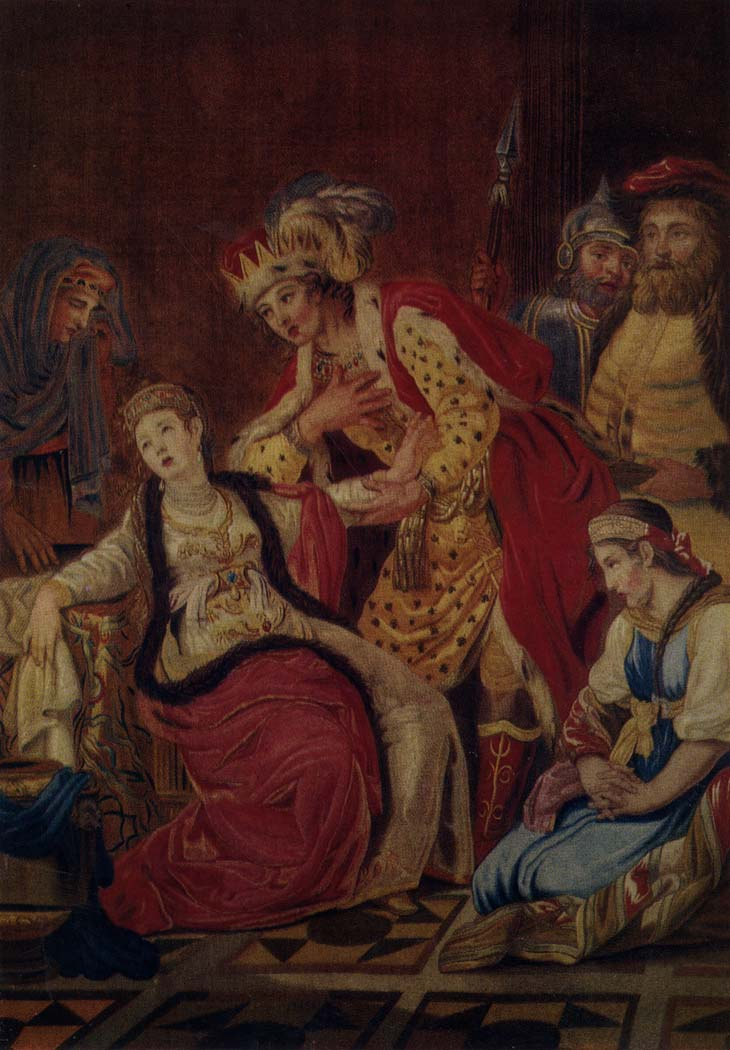
Vladimir and Rogneda (tapestry of the St. Petersburg Tapestry Manufactory, about 1824, State Hermitage)

For his painting Vladimir and Rogneda, the Academy of Arts Council, in a unanimous decree on June 28, 1770, awarded Losenko the title of academician. In the exhibition report and the Council’s decree, the painting was listed under a longer title: "Grand Prince Vladimir Svyatoslavich Before Rogneda, Daughter of Rogvolod, Prince of Polotsk, After the Defeat of This Prince Following His Rejection of Vladimir's Proposal of Marriage to Her". Shortly after, Losenko was appointed professor at the Academy and became the head of the historical painting class. In 1772, he was named director of the Academy of Arts, a role he fulfilled jointly with Nicolas-François Gillet.

Despite the time and energy that managing the Academy and teaching took from him, Losenko continued his creative work. His next significant piece was Farewell of Hector and Andromache (1773), a painting based on events from the Trojan War as described in the Iliad. Some details of the canvas remained somewhat unfinished due to the artist’s passing on November 23, 1773, from dropsy. In his poem To the Deceased Professor and Director of the Academy of Arts Anton Pavlovich Losenko, intended as an epitaph, poet Vasily Maykov wrote, “Rogneda, depicted by you on canvas / With Vladimir, in her wretched fate, / Seems not as much stricken by her father’s death / As she sighs for you!”

The wide renown of Vladimir and Rogneda is evidenced by the creation of a full-size tapestry based on Losenko’s painting at the St. Petersburg Tapestry Manufactory in the late 18th century. This tapestry was gifted to Archduke Joseph and was likely taken by him to Austria. Another tapestry depicting Vladimir and Rogneda, made no later than 1824, was acquired by the State Hermitage Museum in 1954 for its collection.

Until November 1, 1862, the painting Vladimir and Rogneda was kept in the Imperial Hermitage. According to a catalog published between 1773 and 1783, the Hermitage at that time held only two paintings from the Russian school of painting, both by Losenko: The Miraculous Catch of Fish and Vladimir and Rogneda. In 1862, Emperor Alexander II gifted the Vladimir and Rogneda canvas to the Academy of Arts, and it was housed in the Museum of the Imperial Academy of Arts. In 1923, it was transferred to the State Russian Museum.

== Subject and description ==
=== Subject ===
The theme of the painting Vladimir and Rogneda is connected to events during the civil war in Rus’ in the latter half of the 10th century, as described in Rus' chronicle. After the death of Prince Sviatoslav Igorevich in 972, his territories were divided among his three sons: Yaropolk, the eldest, took control of Kyiv; Oleg governed the land of the Drevlians; and Vladimir went to Novgorod. A few years later, Yaropolk and Oleg quarreled and went to war, with Oleg ultimately killed in retreat after a battle in which his forces were defeated. Fearing his elder brother’s military actions, Vladimir fled to Scandinavia, leaving Novgorod, which was soon occupied by Yaropolk, who appointed his own posadniks there. By around 978, Vladimir returned with a retinue of Varangians recruited in Scandinavia, expelled Yaropolk’s officials from Novgorod, and declared that he intended to go to war against his brother.

At that time, Prince Rogvolod ruled in Polotsk and had a daughter named Rogneda. To strengthen his position, Vladimir sought to establish a family alliance with the Polotsk prince and sent his uncle, the voivode Dobrynya (his mother Malusha's brother), as his emissary to negotiate a marriage alliance . However, as described in the Tale of Bygone Years, the proposal did not go as planned. When Rogvolod, in the presence of the emissaries, asked his daughter if she wished to marry Vladimir, Rogneda boldly replied, “I do not wish to unshoe the son of a slave; I want Yaropolk.” By "son of a slave", whom she did not want to "unshue" (according to the Slavic custom of the time, wives take off their husbands' shoes during the wedding rite), Rogneda meant Vladimir, whose mother Malusha was a "slave" - Princess Olga's (the mother of Svyatoslav Igorevich) housekeeper. Rogneda, viewing Vladimir as of lower status, declared her preference for Yaropolk, whom she perceived as more noble and influential than Vladimir, then prince of Novgorod. Upon receiving this answer, Vladimir, enraged, gathered his forces and launched an attack on Polotsk. He captured the city with relative ease, taking the princely family captive. Prince Rogvolod and his two sons were executed, and Vladimir forced Rogneda into marriage.

Based on the theme proposed by the Academy of Arts Council, Losenko developed a detailed "Explanation," outlining his choices for the plot and composition of his painting. According to the artist's description, the academic program offered five potential subjects: 1) the arrival of Vladimir Svyatoslavich's emissaries to Prince Rogvolod of Polotsk to request Rogneda’s hand in marriage; 2) the capture of Polotsk by Vladimir and his forces; 3) the execution of Rogvolod and his two sons; 4) the first meeting of Vladimir and Rogneda; and 5) their wedding. From these options, Losenko chose the fourth: “I imagined Vladimir like this: after his victory and the capture of Polotsk, when he first entered Rogneda’s quarters and saw her for the first time, the plot of the painting can thus be titled—Vladimir’s first meeting with Rogneda, where he is depicted as a victor and proud Rogneda as a captive.” Discussing the details of his chosen plot, the artist wrote: “Vladimir married Rogneda against her will; however, once he married her, he must have loved her. Therefore, I portrayed him as a lover, who, seeing his bride dishonored and deprived of everything, had to console and apologize to her.” Losenko aimed to avoid any suggestion that Vladimir had “himself dishonored her and then married her,” but noted that, even if that were the case, the painting “only depicts their very first meeting.”

=== Characters and composition ===
The scene depicted in the painting Vladimir and Rogneda takes place in Polotsk, within Rogneda’s princely chambers. The setting is interpreted by the artist in an antique spirit, as indicated by elements such as the bases of classical pilasters, a marble floor with a mosaic pattern, and an ancient vase positioned on the floor to the left. The blank wall with pilasters forms a backdrop, resulting in the action being concentrated within a relatively confined space in the foreground. This setting choice brings about a composition that is both frontal and flat.

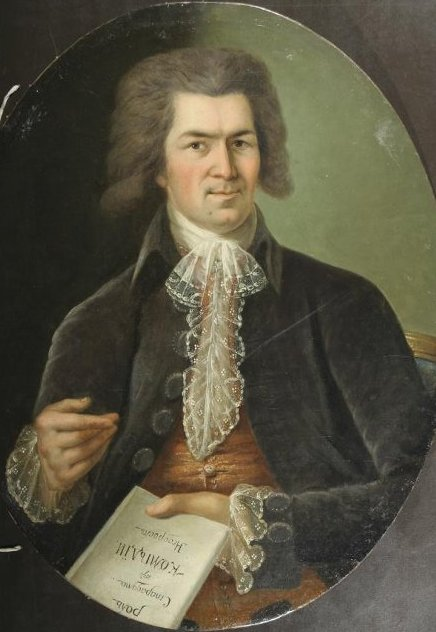
Unknown artist. Ivan Dmitrevsky as Starodum (1780s)

The leading figure in the composition of Vladimir and Rogneda is Prince Vladimir. Losenko describes Vladimir’s portrayal in his "Explanation" as follows: “Vladimir [is] in Rogneda's chambers, standing before her in military attire, expresses his apologies for the offense brought to her homeland and comforting her sorrow with fervor of love, and as if ardently desires to kiss her outstretched hand.” Vladimir is the most active character, pressing his hand to his heart, leaning towards Rogneda in an attempt to convince her of the sincerity and strength of his feelings, as well as the purity of his intentions. Unlike traditional representations in Old Russian art where Vladimir is typically depicted as a saint, in Losenko’s interpretation the prince "became a man whose actions must be explained based on the laws of the human heart.” At the same time, the artist strives to “ennoble, elevate beyond the realm of base passions, purify Vladimir’s image.”

Researchers of Losenko's work believe that the image of Prince Vladimir was modeled after the actor Ivan Dmitrevsky (sometimes spelled Dmitrievsky). In the 1829 publication A Brief Historical Account of the State of the Imperial Academy of Arts, Academy President Alexey Olenin wrote that "the then glorious actor Dmitrevsky served, as they say, in his theatrical costume, as a model for Vladimir." Art historian Avraam Kaganovich, comparing Vladimir as depicted by Losenko with a portrait of Dmitrevsky in the role of Starodum in the comedy The Minor (created no earlier than 1782), observed that, despite a twelve-year gap or more, they are strikingly similar — "it is the same face: a distinctive elongated eye shape, characteristic nose and chin pattern, slightly puffy upper eyelids." According to Kaganovich, there is no doubt that Dmitrevsky was indeed Losenko’s model for the painting.

The image of Rogneda is more abstract than that of Vladimir standing before her. Unlike the active Novgorod prince, the pale and tear-stained Rogneda, who is "in a semi-fainting state", is "a passive heroine, as if 'of the secondary role', ceding the first 'leading part' to Vladimir". In his Explanation, Losenko described her as follows: "Rogneda is portrayed in traditional ancient royal attire, seated in despair, gazing upward, with her right hand resting on a small table, and her left arm extended toward Vladimir as if dismissing him with disdain." The image of Rogneda's head is emphasized as ideal, including the oval of her face and her upward-looking eyes expressing suffering. At the same time, her figure and arms are apparently executed based on life sketches. In 1864, the writer Pyotr Petrov claimed that Ivan Dmitrevsky might have posed for Losenko as the image of Rogneda as well; however, Kaganovich considered such "speculations" to be unfounded.

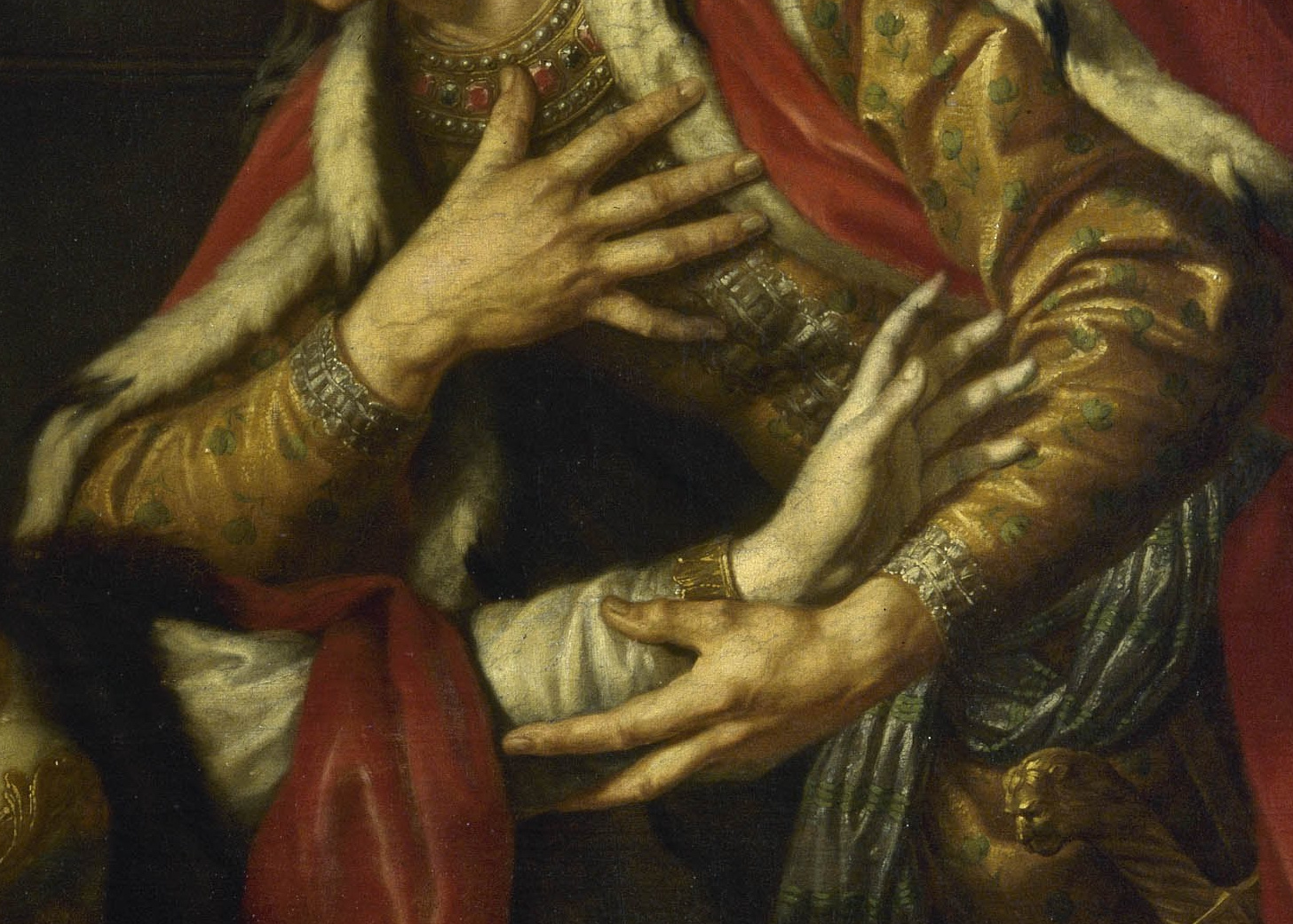
The hands of Vladimir and Rogneda - the compositional centre of the canvas

The center of the composition—"the genuine knot that seemingly 'ties' all the participants into a single whole"—is the point where the hands of the main characters meet. With his left hand, Vladimir supports Rogneda's hand, which is raised in despair, while his right hand points in the same direction as the princess's hand, as if he is pleading for forgiveness with his gesture. According to art historian Alla Vereshchagina, "this is a peculiar conversation of hands that largely determines the content the artist wanted to convey in the painting."

In the right part of the canvas, two warriors accompanying Vladimir are depicted. Art historian Alexey Savinov noted that Losenko "characterized [the figures of the warriors] in their calmness, corporeality, and physical strength, which allows for a clearer perception of the greater complexity and spirituality of the main images." The elderly warrior in a fur-trimmed hat represents Dobrynya, Vladimir's uncle. Initially, the artist intended to portray three companions of the prince—he wrote in his "Explanation": "Behind Vladimir [are] three of his armed warriors, looking attentively at their [Vladimir and Rogneda's] actions."

The painting also depicts two maids of Rogneda, among whom the most important character is the maid kneeling in the right corner. Losenko himself described her as follows: "The girl kneeling before Rogneda [is] dressed in Russian attire." The figure of the maid is filled with semantic connection to Rogneda; she looks at her mistress with compassion. The image of the maid intrigued Empress Catherine II, who noted this in a letter dated August 18, 1770, to the sculptor Étienne Maurice Falconet: "I am very pleased to hear that you are satisfied with Losenko, do tell me someday a word about his painting written for receiving the title of academician. There is a kneeling woman who I like, to my eyes, she is painted in the manner of Raphael, as far as can be judged by engravings."

Fragments of the painting Vladimir and Rogneda

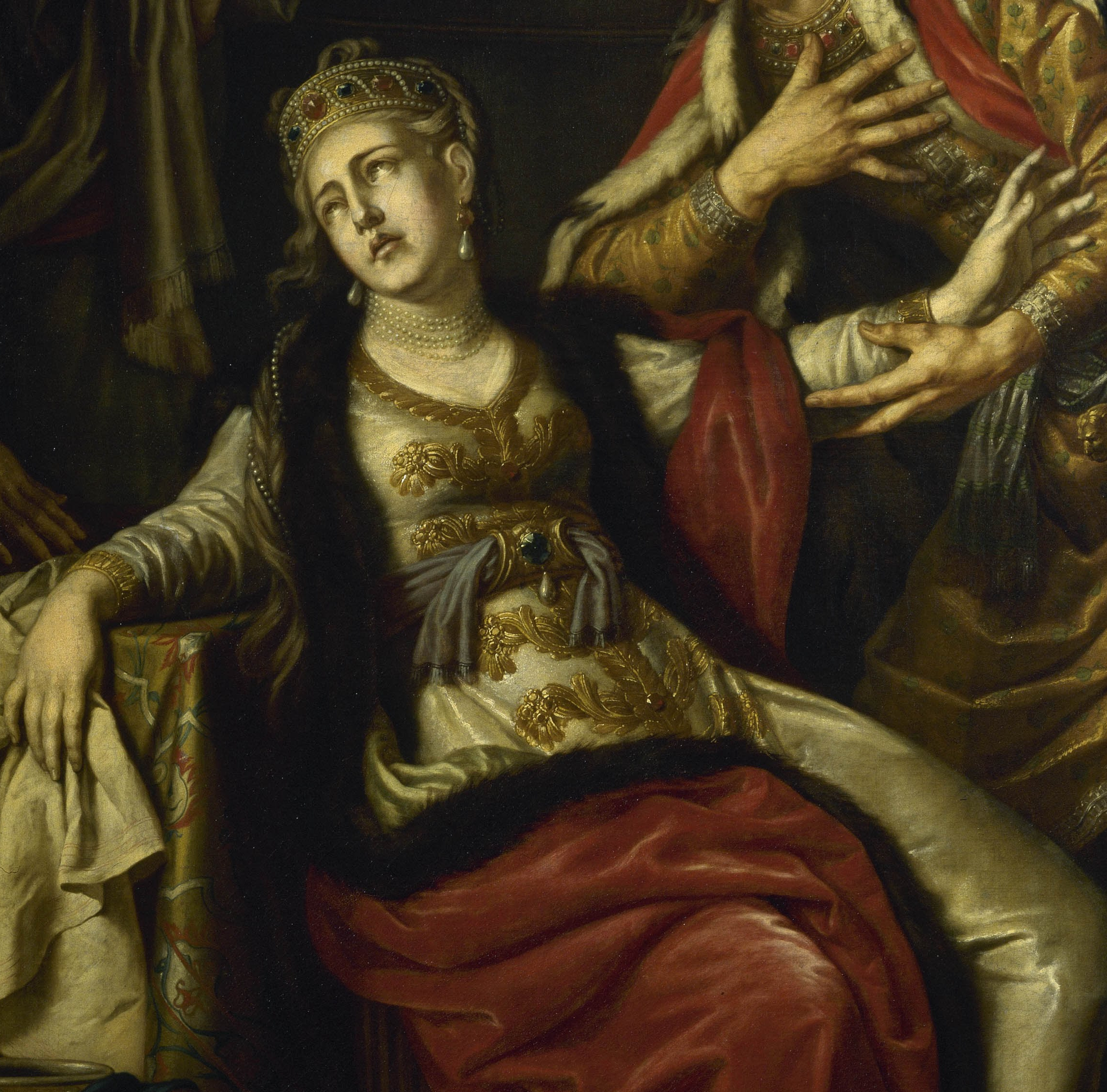
Rogneda

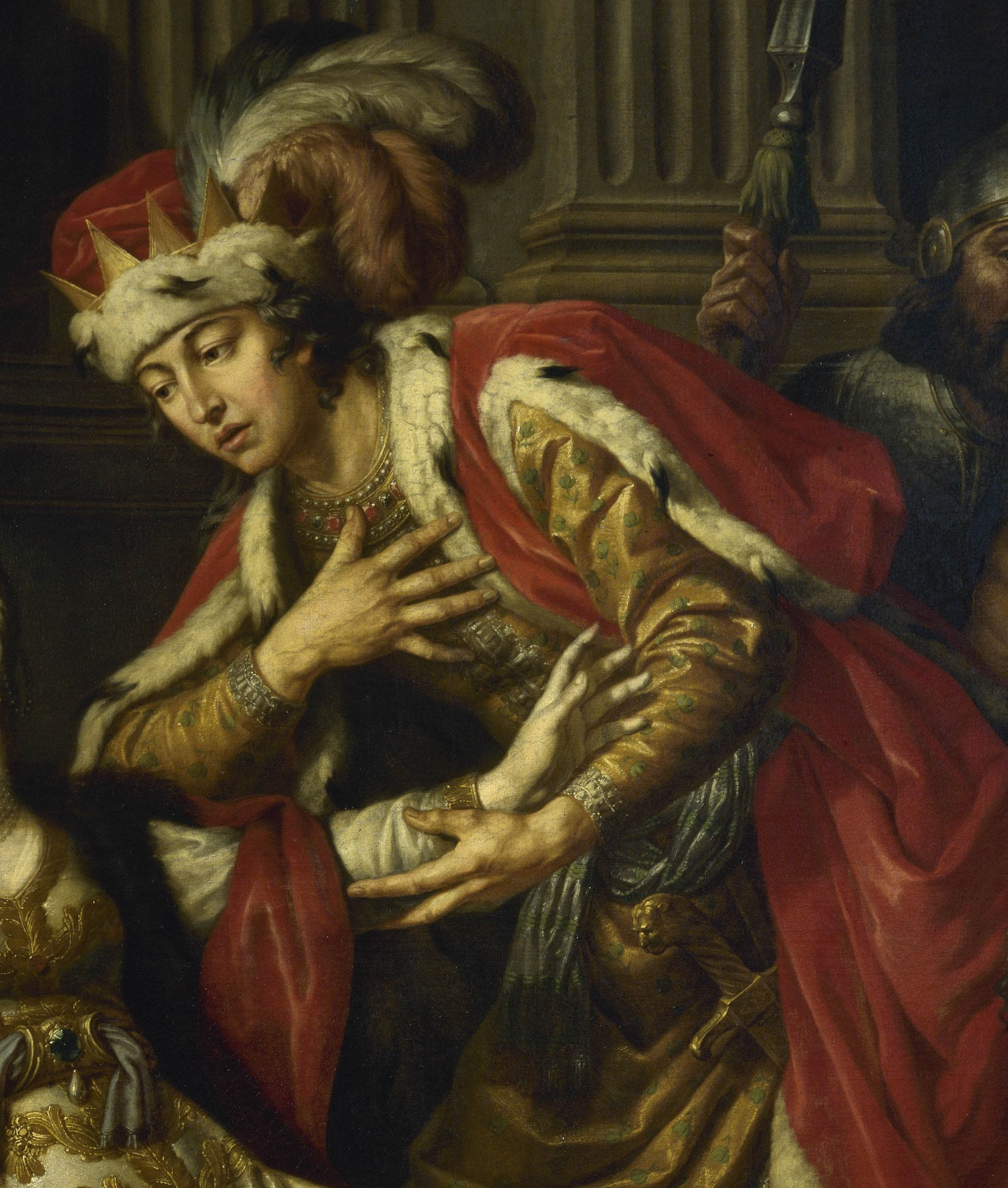
Vladimir

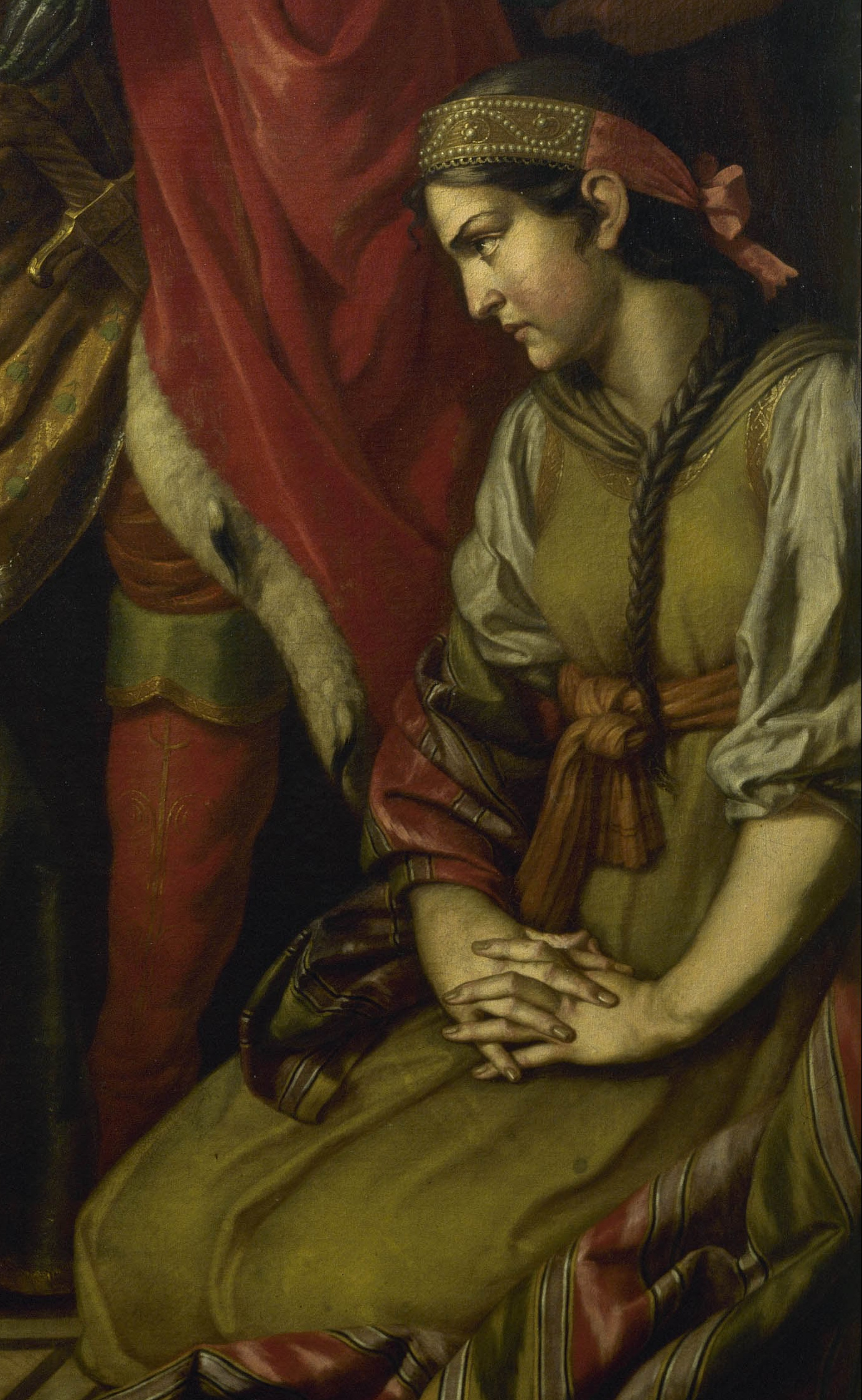
Servant

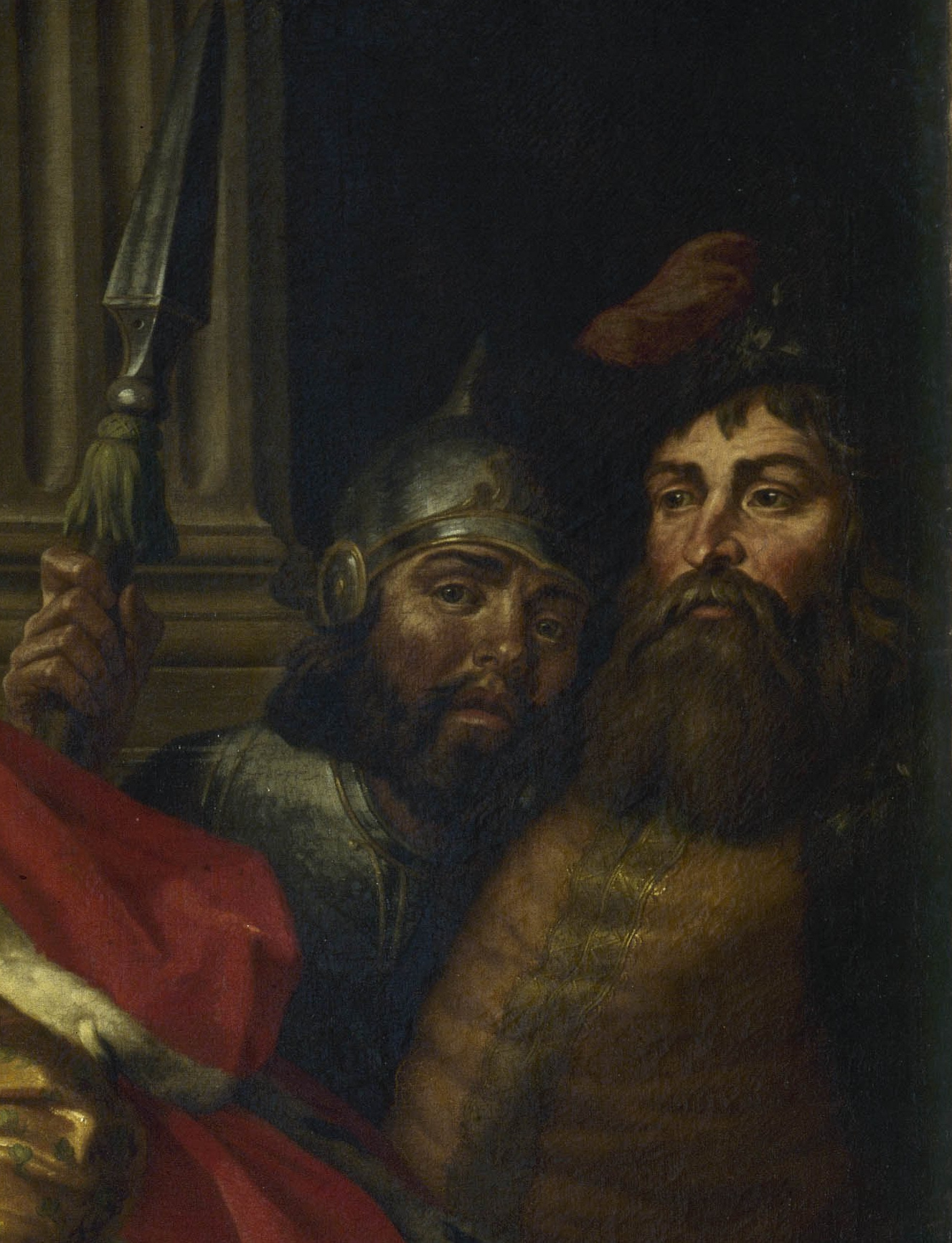
Vladimir's companions

A significant challenge in creating the painting was the lack of reliable historical sources to reference for the main characters' costumes, leaving the artist with only fragmented and incidental information. Losenko likely had to rely on theatrical props, which might have inspired Vladimir’s headpiece—a “an incredible mixture of a crown with prongs, a hat trimmed with ermine, and even ostrich feathers.” Art historian Alla Vereshchagina observed that Vladimir’s shirt and boots, along with Rogneda’s dress, “bear some resemblance (though imprecise) to old Russian attire from the pre-Petrine period,” while the warriors’ clothing and the kneeling servant’s outfit “align closely with peasant dress.” In justifying the inaccuracy of the costumes, Losenko wrote: “I, knowing what is beneficial or harmful for painting, preferred the natural to the ideal. And if I could get all that nature that is to be done in my painting, I would be able to avoid all the historical critique and get rid of the extraordinary censures to which, unfortunately, painting is subjected..”

== Sketches and studies ==
=== Sketches ===
Three graphic sketches by Losenko, created in the process of working on the painting Vladimir and Rogneda, have been preserved. All are dated to 1769–1770. The most likely chronological order of these sketches is outlined in the monograph by art historian Avraam Kaganovich. The first is a sketch in a horizontally elongated format, stored at the Research Museum of the Russian Academy of Arts (paper, pencil, chalk, 18.0 × 24.0 cm, inventory R-763). The second, done in a vertically elongated format, is in the collection of the State Russian Museum (paper, pencil, 22.5 × 18.2 cm, inventory R-13010). The third sketch, also vertical, is likewise kept in the Russian Museum (paper, pencil, 29.1 × 21.7 cm, inventory R-1226).

Graphic sketches for the painting Vladimir and Rogneda

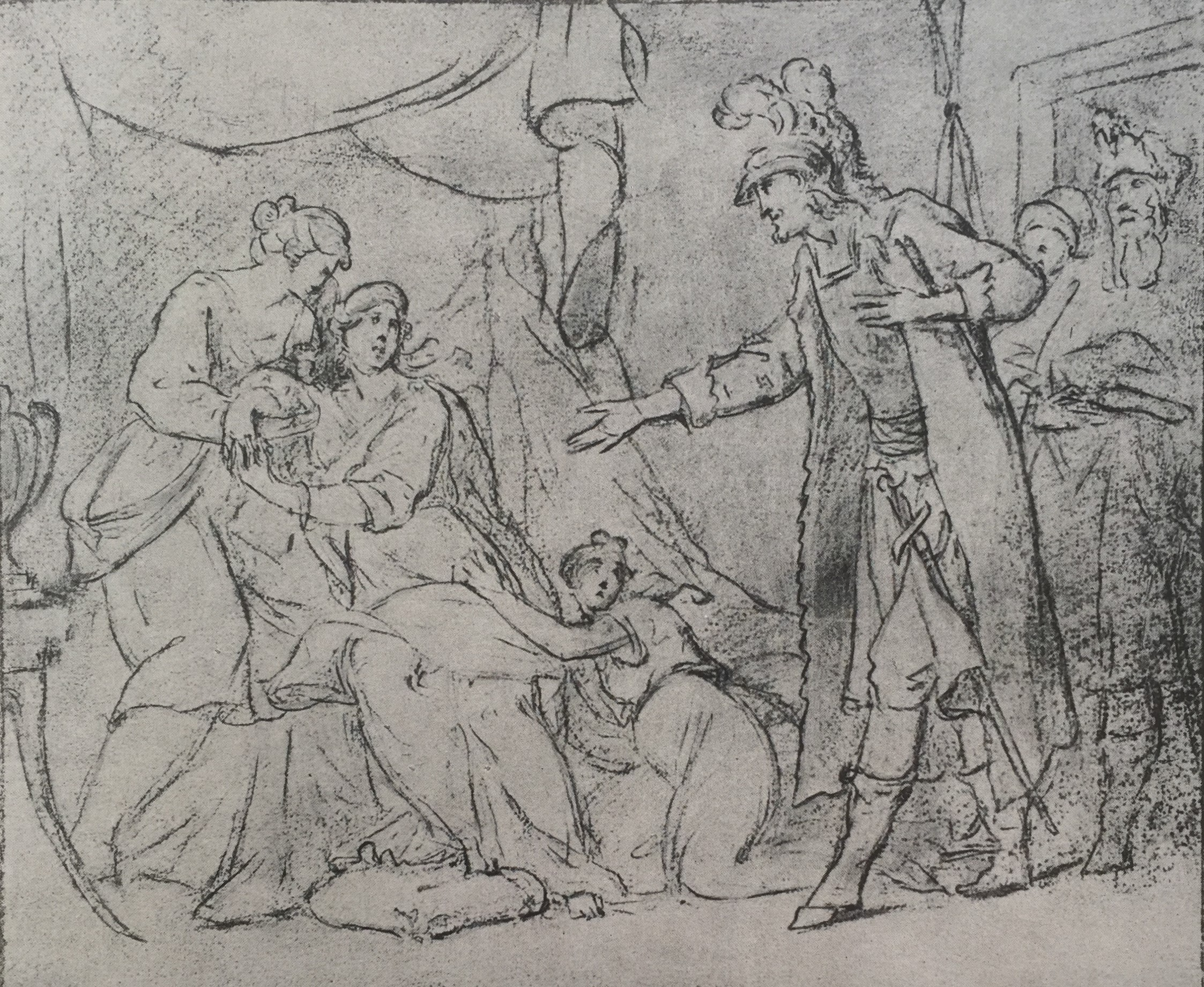
First sketch (Museum of the Russian Academy of Arts)

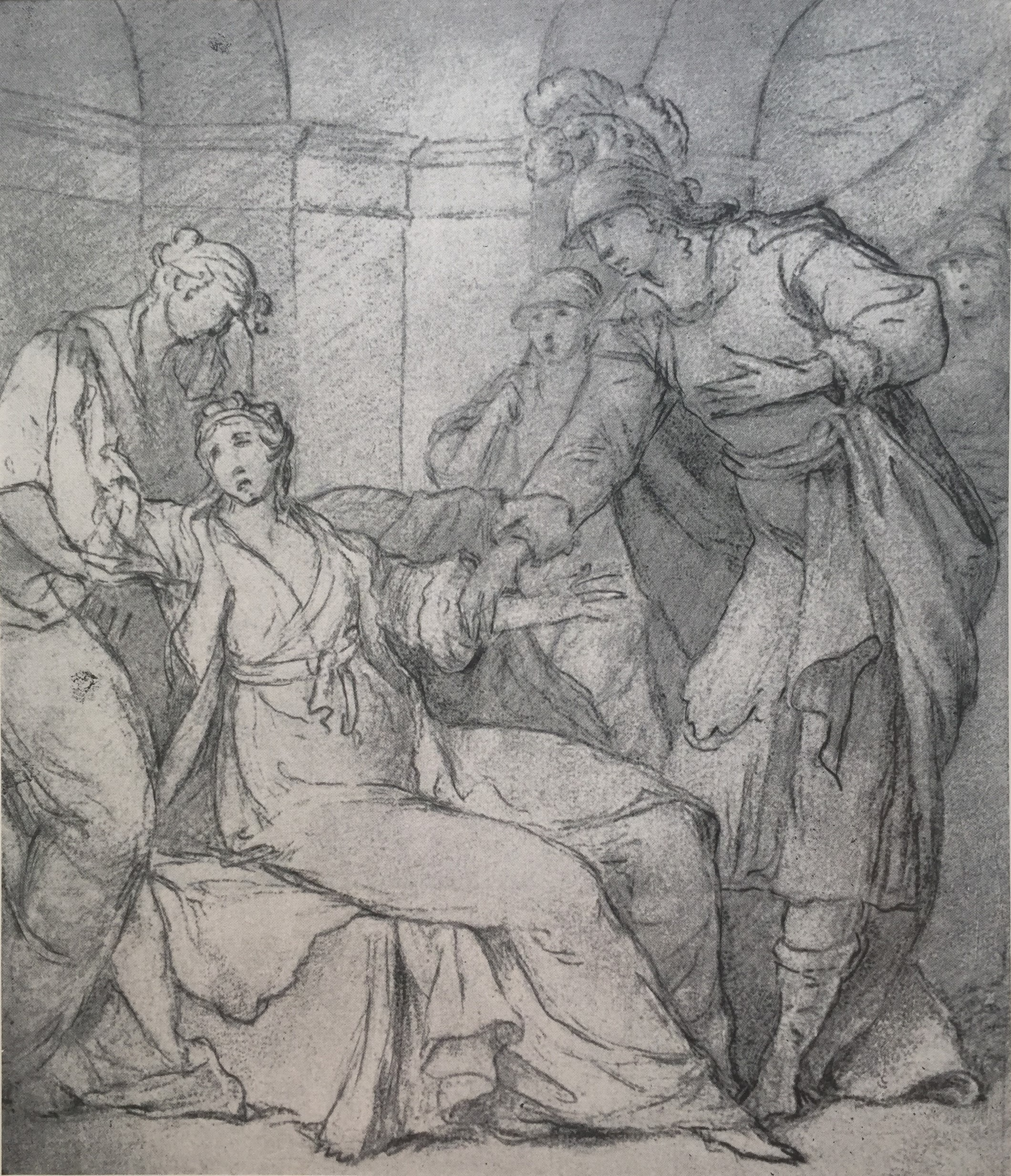
Second sketch (Russian Museum)

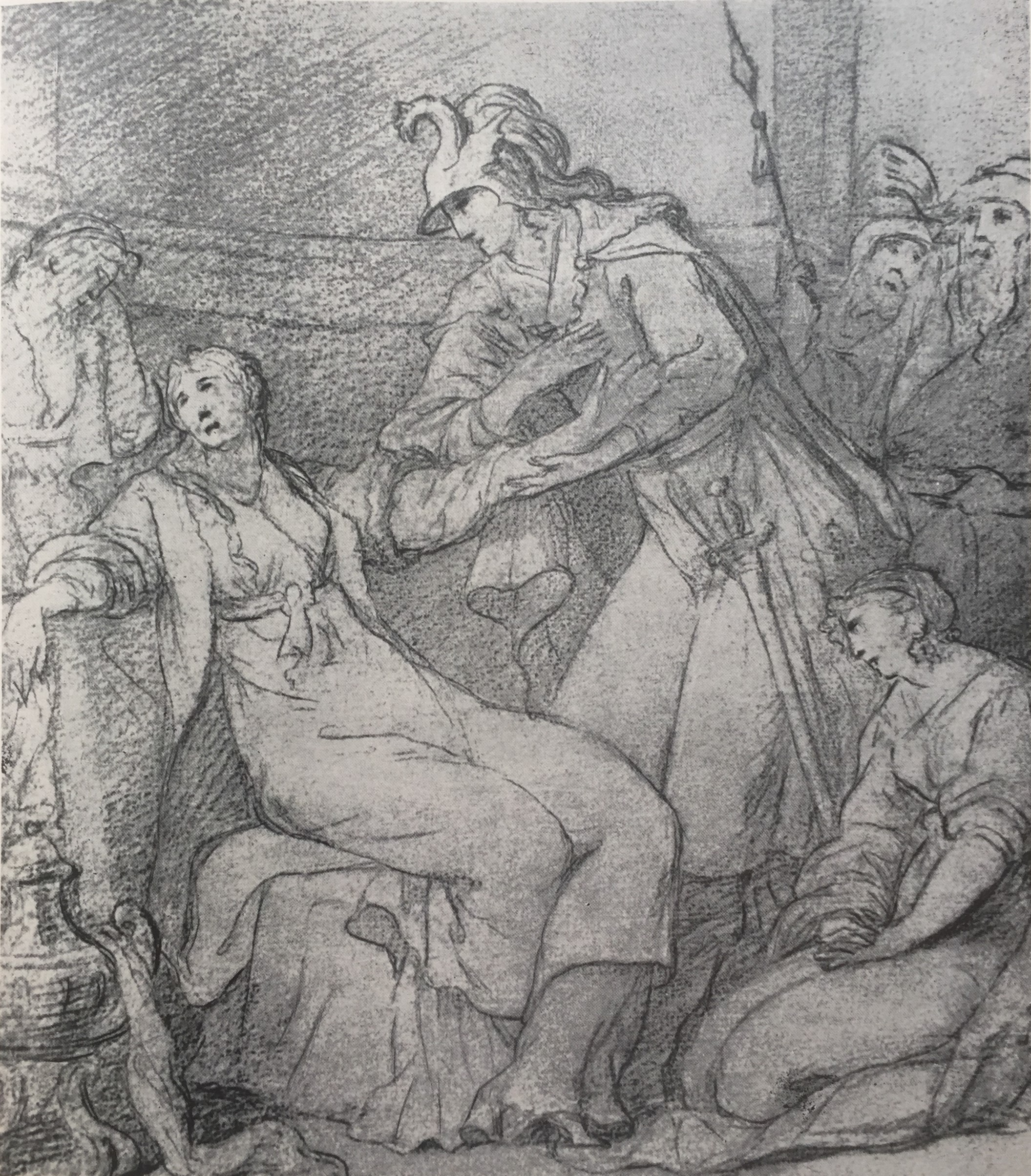
Third sketch (Russian Museum)

=== Studies ===
The collection of the State Russian Museum holds several graphic studies of male heads used by the artist to develop figures accompanying Vladimir. According to Avraam Kaganovich, “though each drawing of a peasant is a bust view, they provide a complete impression of the person and their character.” Among these studies are Head of a Peasant in an Ushanka, or Peasant in a Treukh (paper, pencil, 15.2 × 12.4 cm, inventory R-1210); Head of a Peasant in a Helmet (paper, pencil, 10.3 × 13.8 cm, inventory R-1209); Two Men's Heads, or Warrior and Peasant (paper, pencil, 13.5 × 19.5 cm or 14 × 21.8 cm, inventory R-13011); a second Head of a Peasant in a Helmet (paper, pencil, 14.0 × 10.0 cm, inventory R-1201); and a third Head of a Peasant in a Helmet, or Warrior in a Helmet (paper, pencil, 13.8 × 10.4 cm, inventory R-1211). These studies were long kept in the Hermitage Museum, labeled as “drawings by an unknown French master.” In the opinion of art historian Evgenia Gavrilova, they indeed appear as “genuine masterpieces of European caliber.” In 1926, these Hermitage drawings by Losenko were “rediscovered” by artist and art historian Stepan Yaremich.

Graphic studies for the painting Vladimir and Rogneda

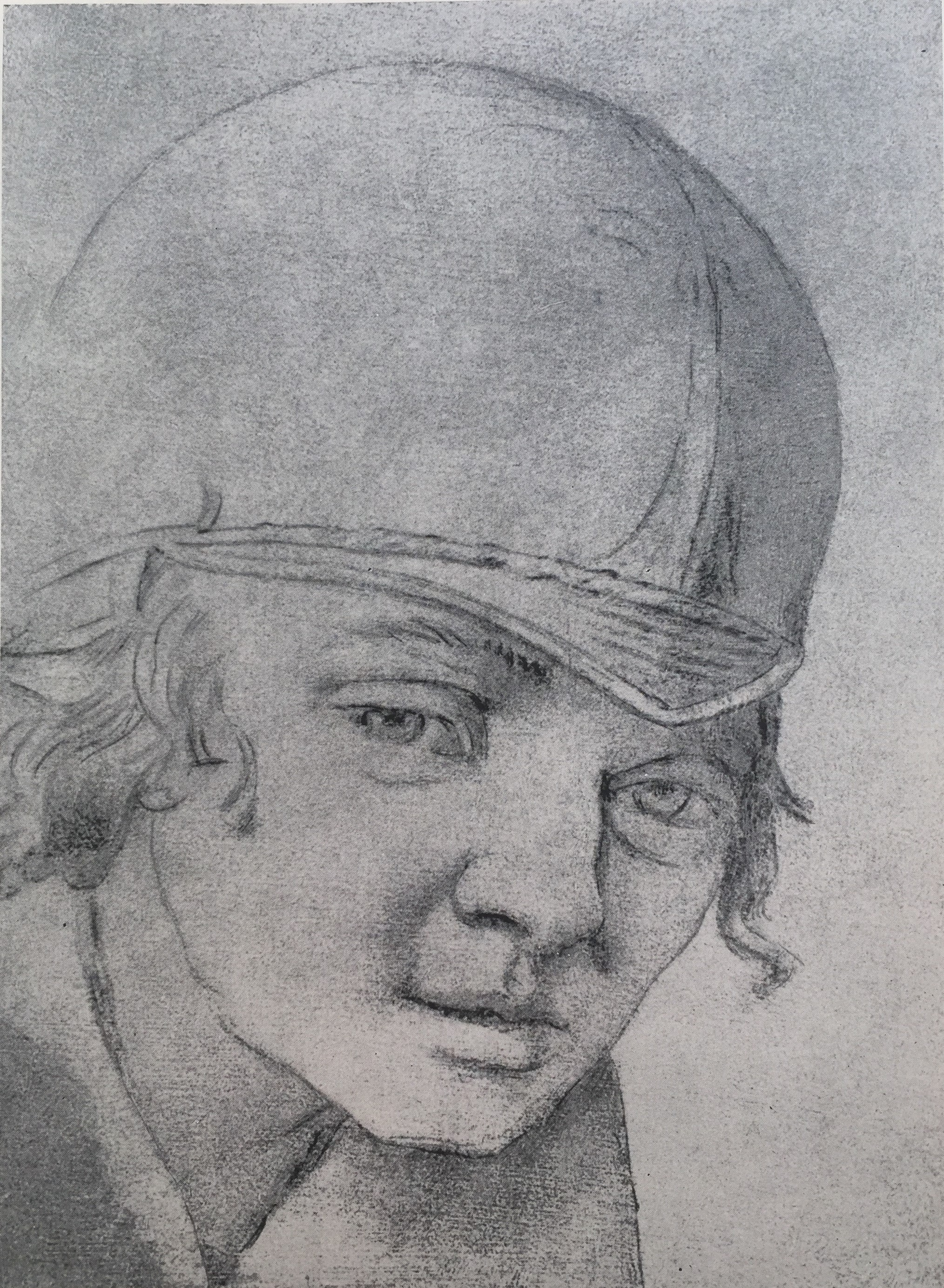
Head of a Peasant in a Helmet

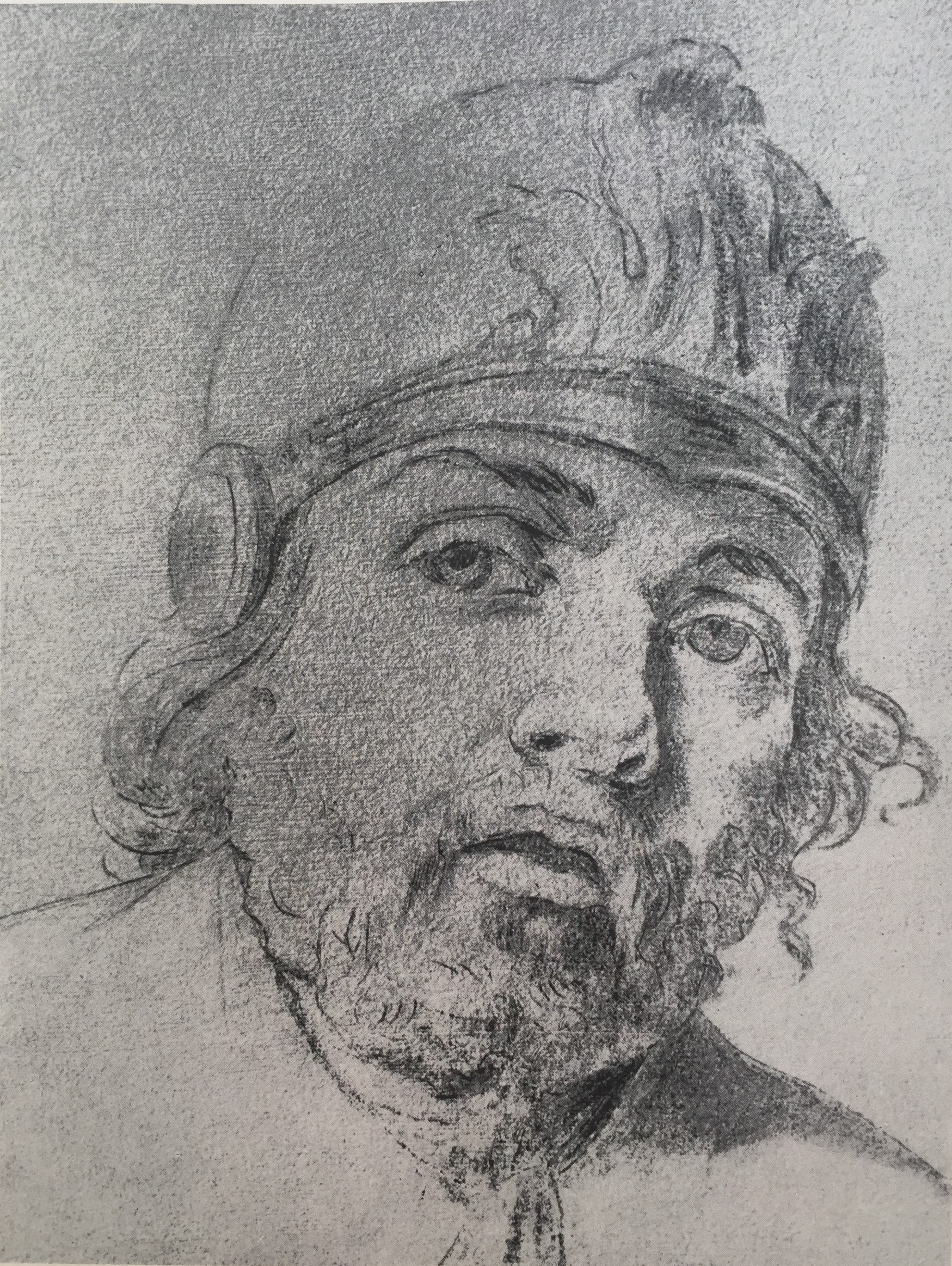
Head of a Peasant in a Helmet

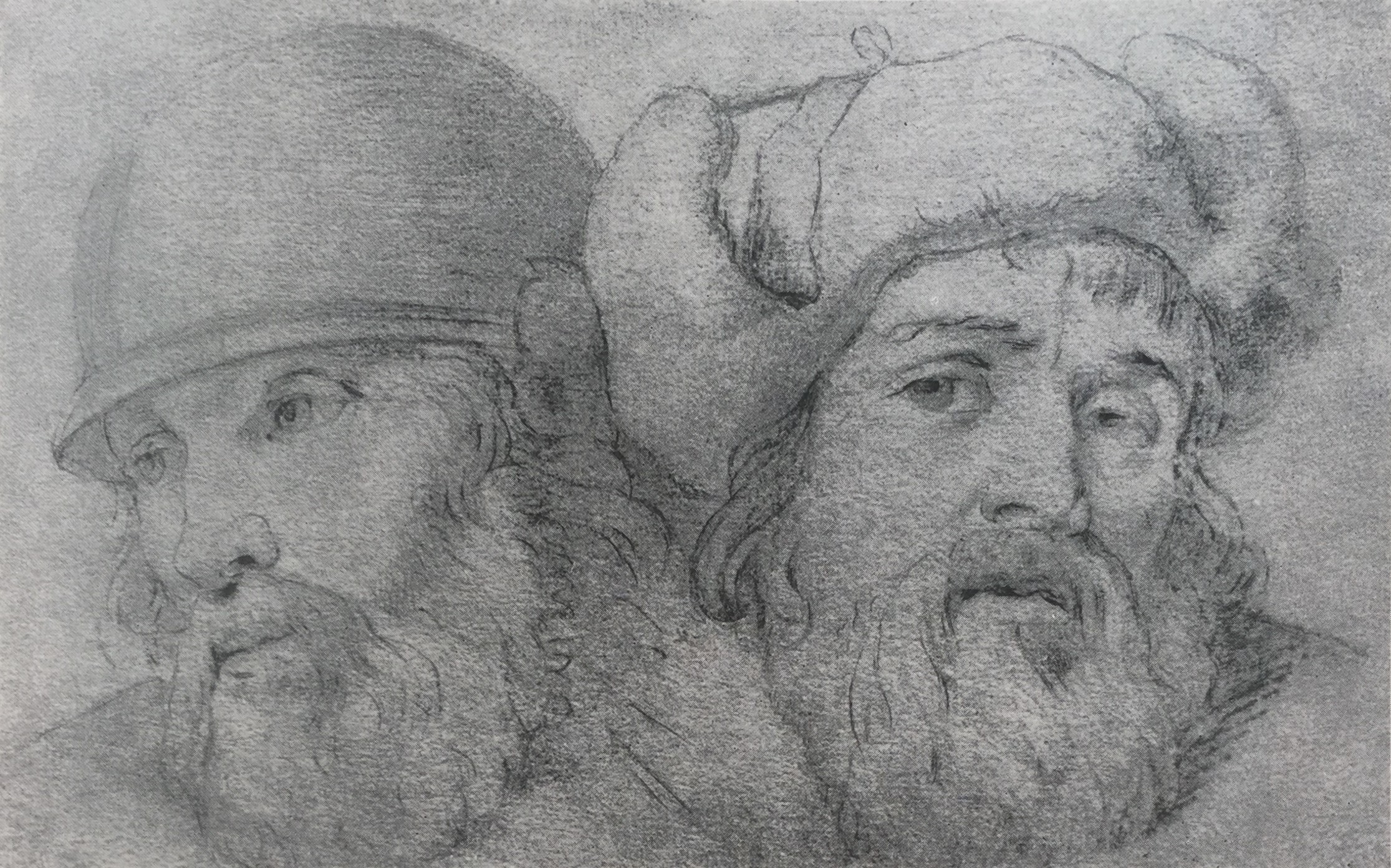
Two Men's Heads

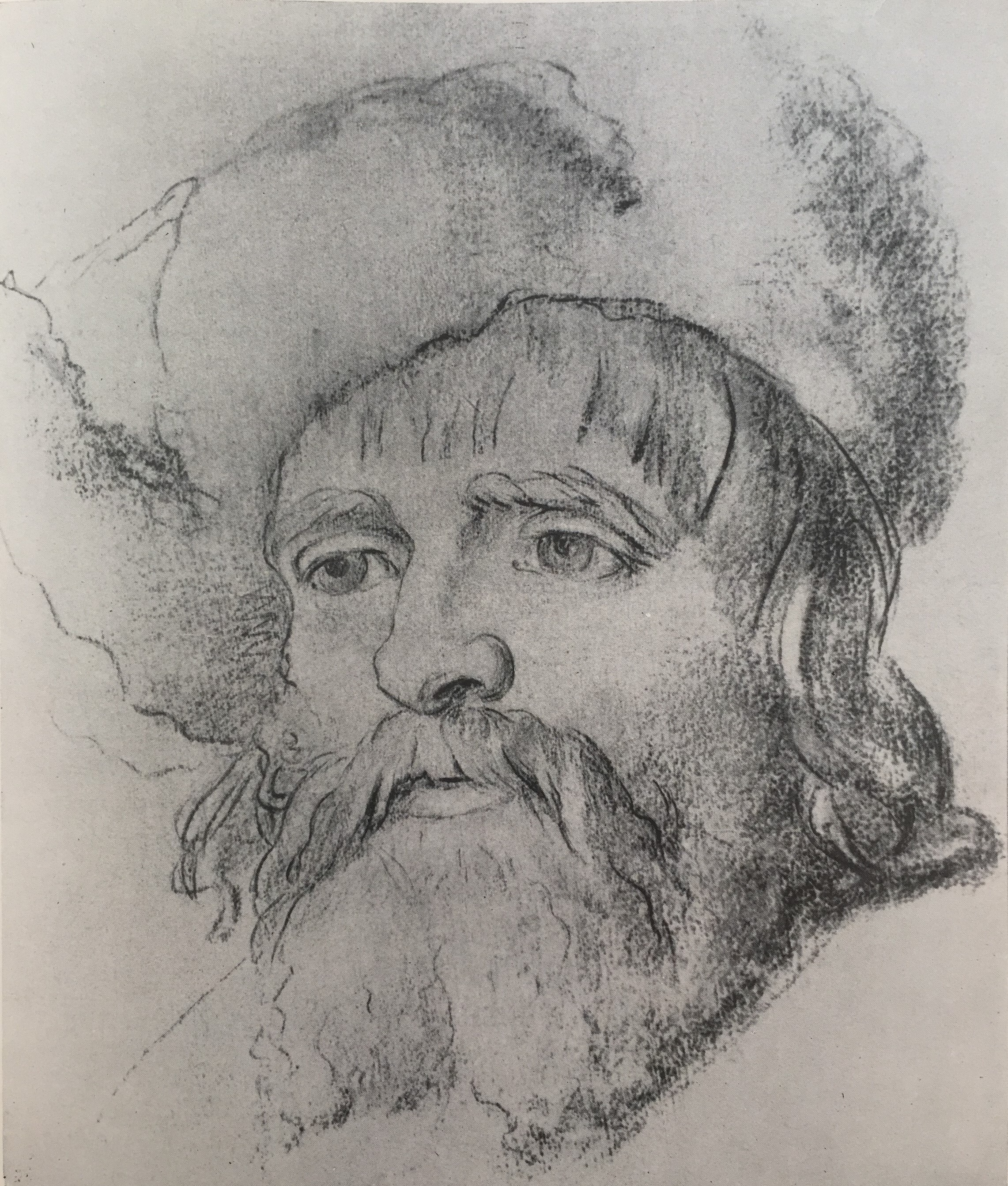
Head of a Peasant in an Ushanka

The Research Museum of the Russian Academy of Arts holds graphic studies for female figures, including Rogneda's Head (paper, pencil, 22.0 × 16.0 cm, inventory 1872) and A Woman's Head (paper, pencil, 22.0 × 16.0 cm, inventory 1873). According to Avraam Kaganovich, the second of these sketches likely relates to the image of a servant. Although she "does not look from under her brows but rather directly and openly," "her resemblance to the painting's image is undeniable." Additionally, the collection at the State Russian Museum contains studies for the hands of various characters: Hand (paper, pencil, 12.3 × 12.4 cm, inventory R-1198), Hands (paper, pencil, 14.0 × 21.6 cm, State Russian Museum, inventory R-1203, depicting the servant's clasped hands), and another Hands study (paper, pencil, 21.6 × 19.5 cm, inventory R-1204).

Graphic studies for the painting Vladimir and Rogneda

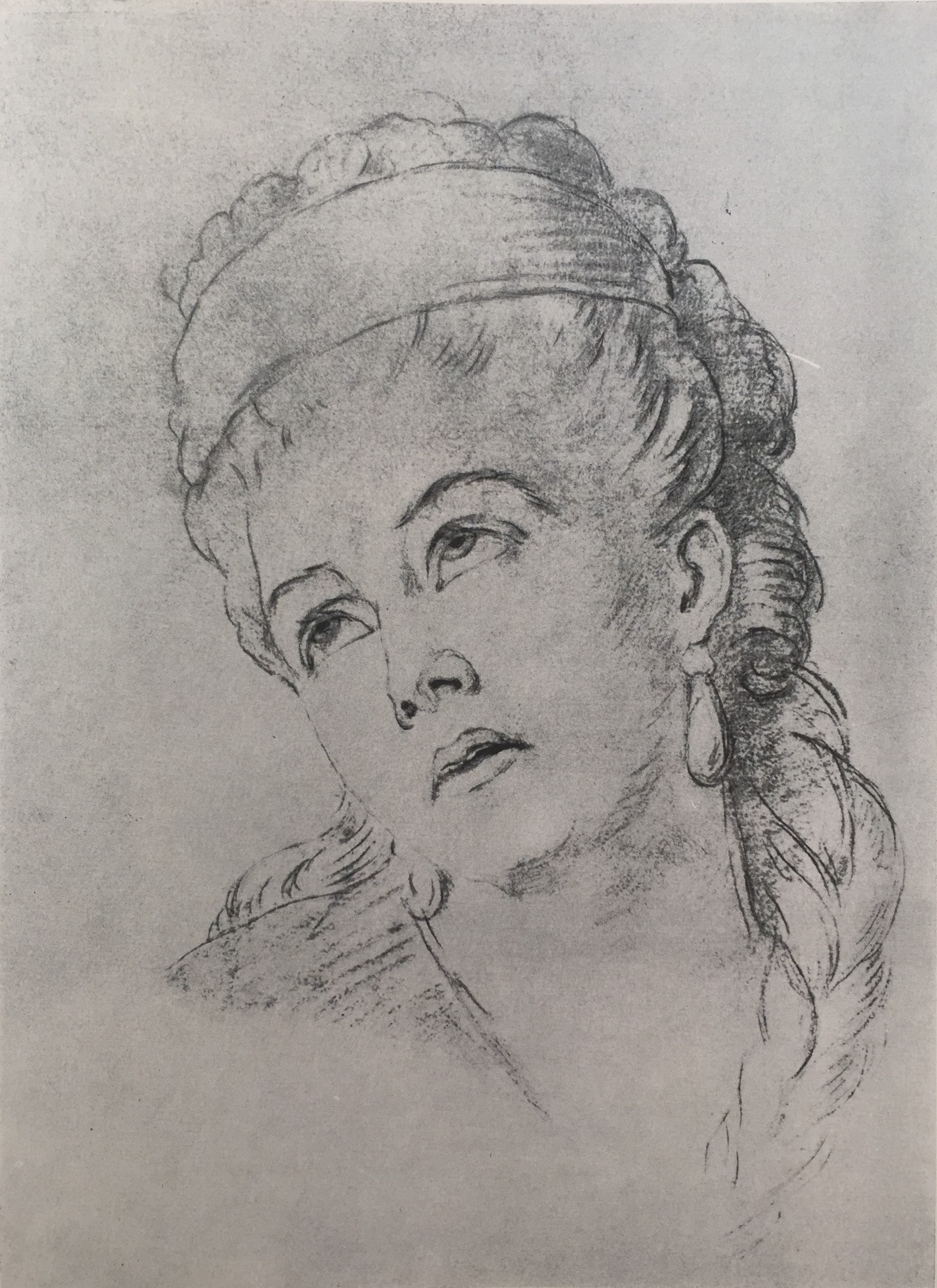
Rogneda's Head

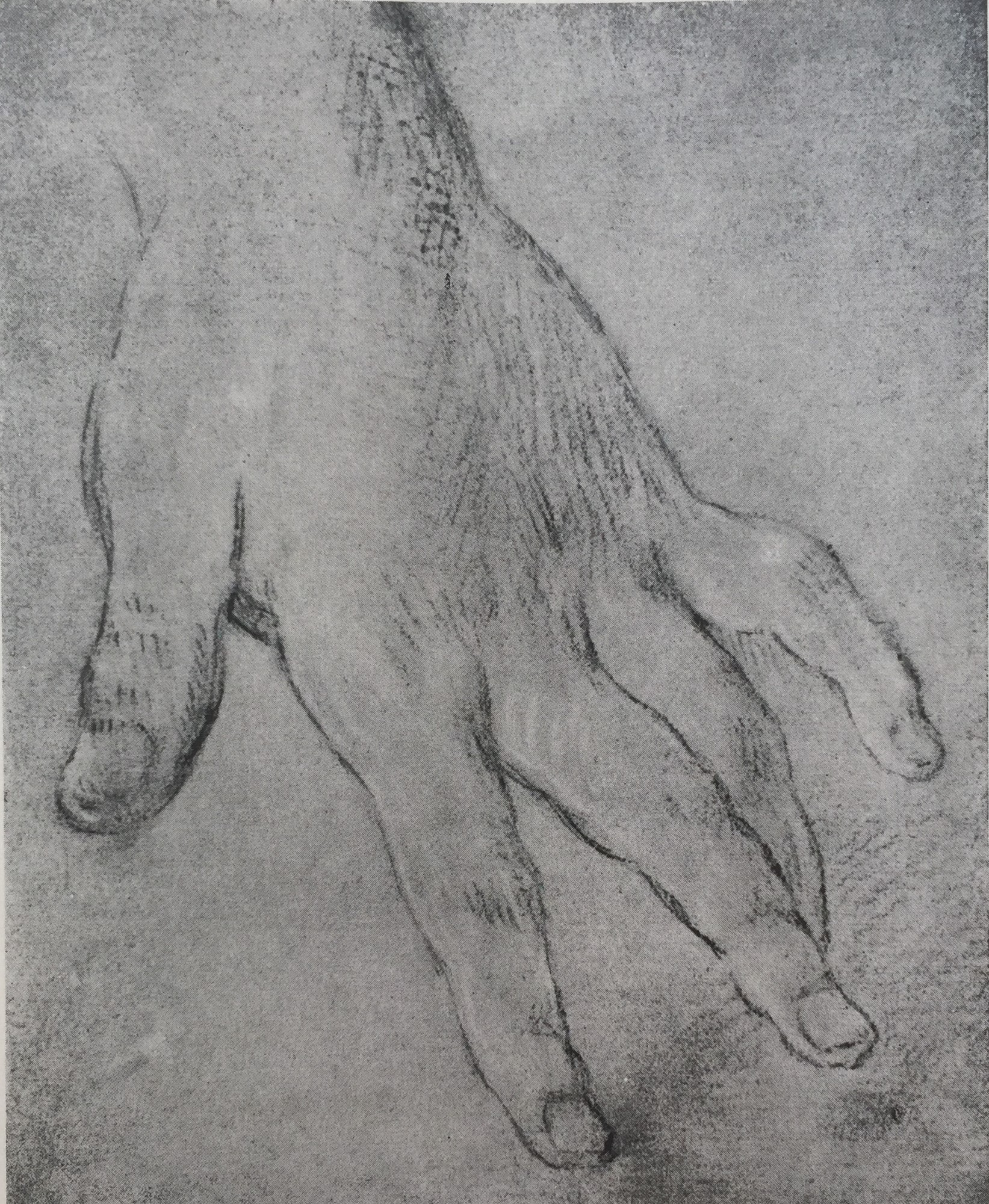
Hand

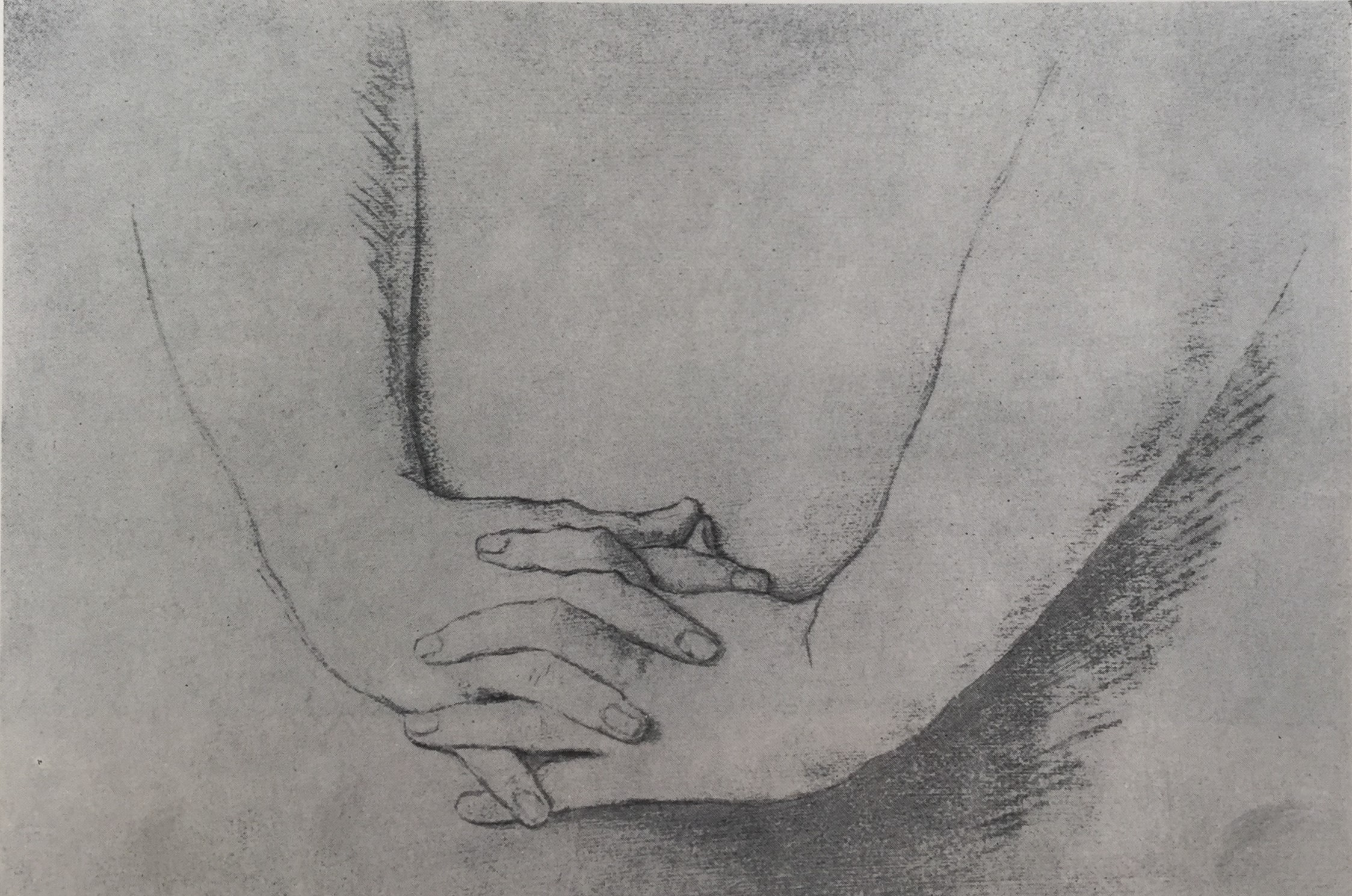
Hands

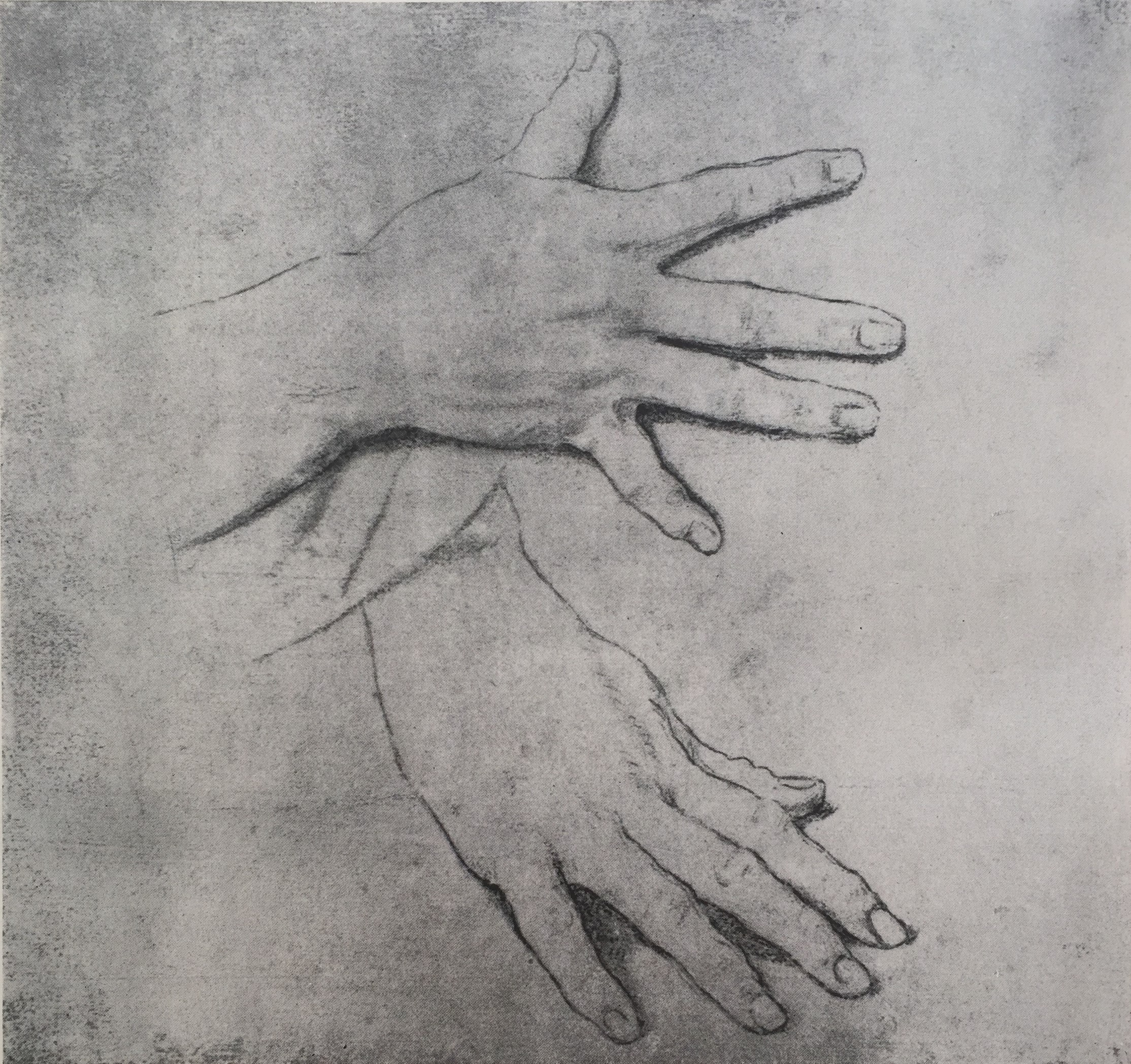
Hands

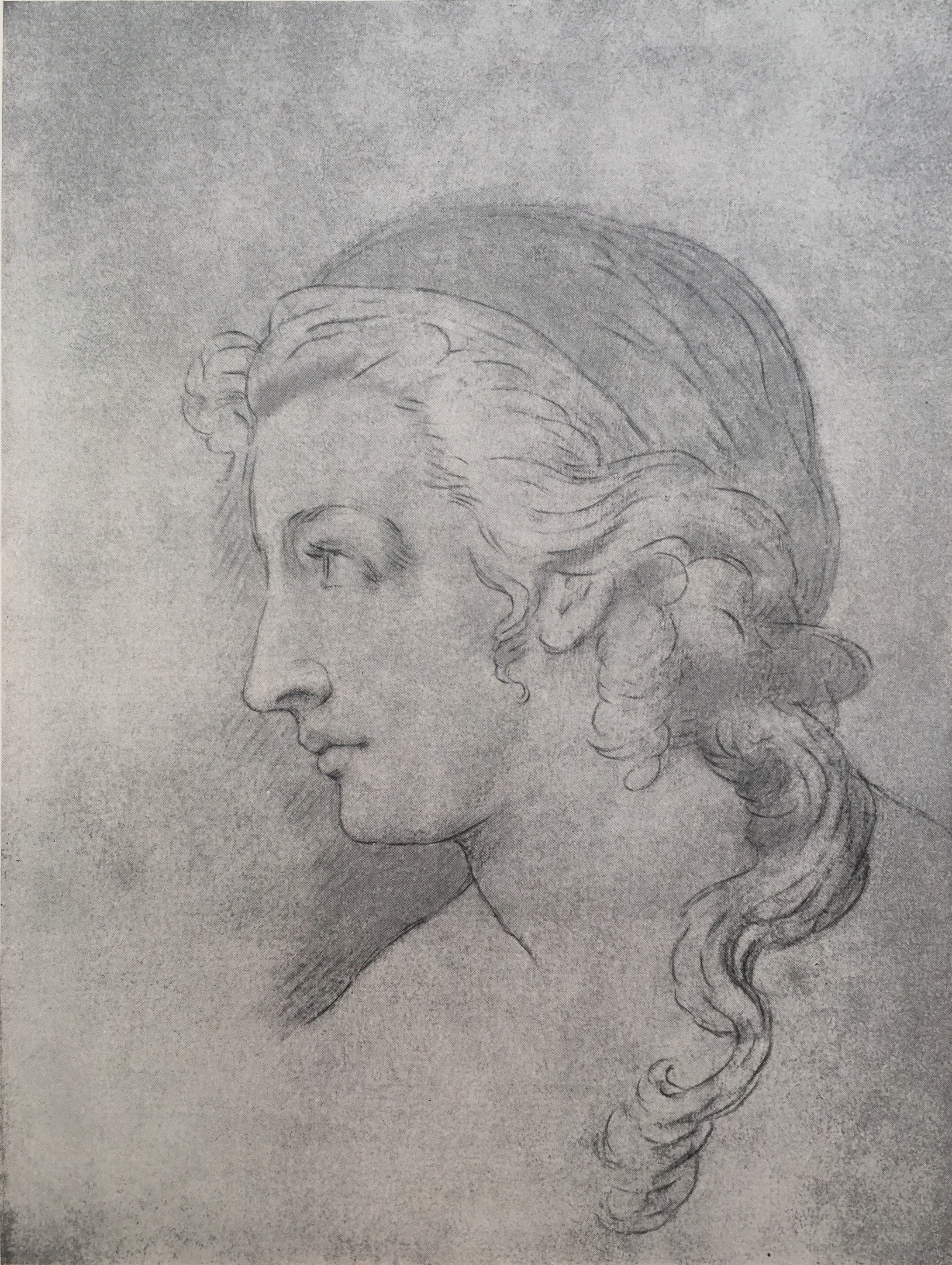
A Woman's Head

== Reviews and criticism ==
In his 1864 biographical essay on Losenko, writer and historiographer of Russian art Pyotr Petrov noted that Vladimir and Rogneda can't be considered the artist’s best work, as this painting "celebrated by contemporaries" suffers from numerous anachronisms. However, Petrov argued that the artist should not be blamed for this, since "not only was there no concepr of historical costume at that time," but even the historical accounts in textbooks were "filled with gross errors." According to Petrov, when viewing Losenko’s painting, the viewer cannot help but smile at "seeing Vladimir in a fantastical outfit, and Rogneda with an expression [that is] not passionionate, but cloyingly coy," though this very quality was what appealed to the artist’s contemporaries.

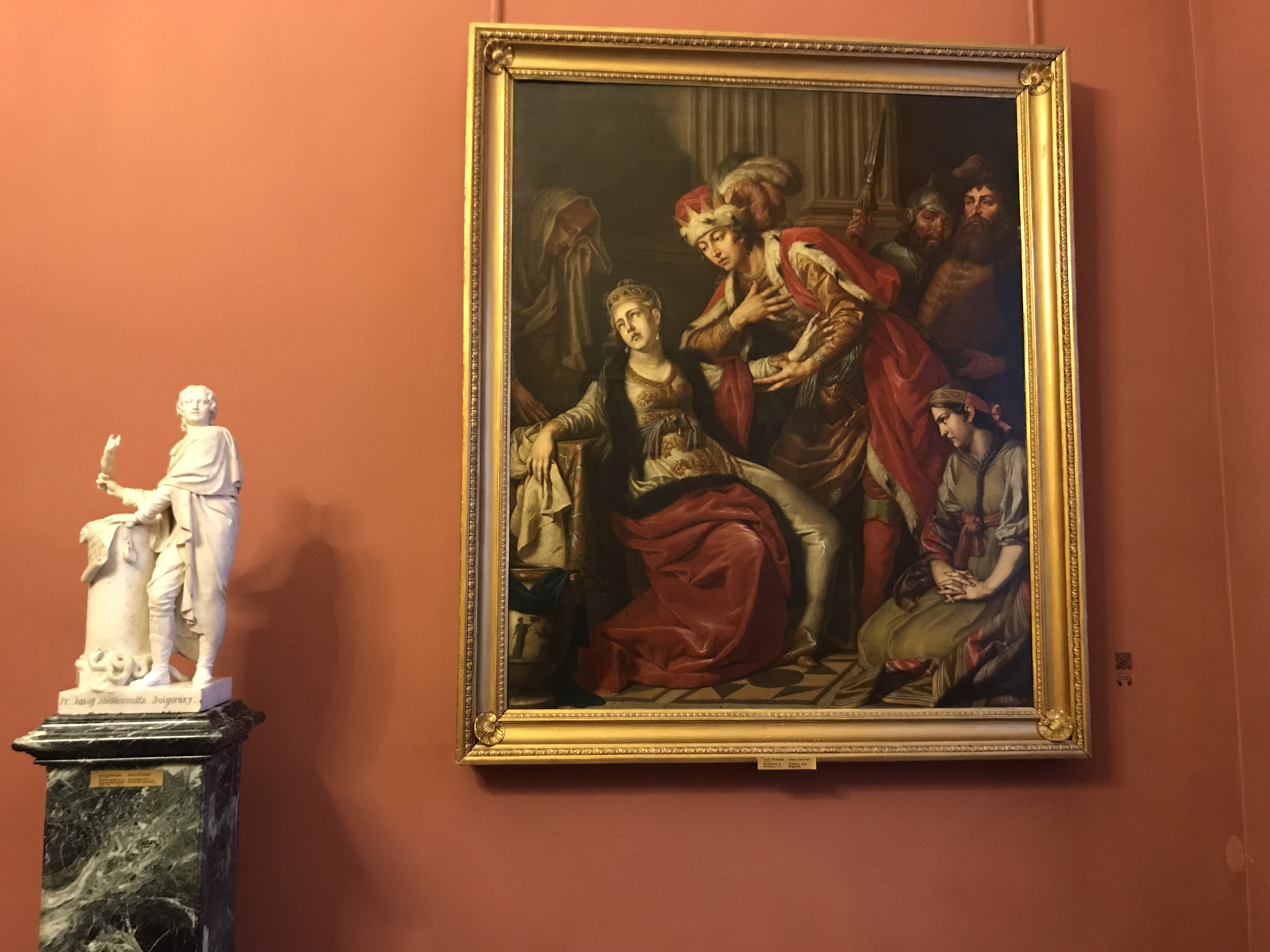
The painting Vladimir and Rogneda in the State Russian Museum

In a 1914 review article on Losenko's work, art historian Sergey Ernst, while noting the shortcomings of Vladimir and Rogneda, wrote that none of the artist’s other paintings displayed “such a pronounced pose of theatricality as this one.” He found the painting itself to be “painfully reminiscent of an illustration from some sentimental scene in an 18th-century historical tragedy.” According to Ernst, “the only sound element in the entire group” are the “simply and attentively drawn” heads of the two warriors, which recall peasant depictions created in the 19th century by Alexey Venetsianov and later by some of the Peredvizhniki.

According to art historian Alexey Savinov, the painting Vladimir and Rogneda, which appeared at the 1770 Academy exhibition, became "a new word in Russian painting." In the Academy of Arts, it was the first "major work created on a national theme" and represented "a kind of declaration of an independent path of development" for both the Academy itself and for the historical genre within Russian visual art. Savinov wrote that with the completion of Vladimir and Rogneda, Losenko moved to the "front row of the Russian artists of the second half of the 18th century."

Art historian Avraam Kaganovich wrote that the painting Vladimir and Rogneda is not only a distinctive example of 18th-century historical painting, but also holds great significance as a "characteristic work of Russian art, reflecting the typical features of its time both in content and artistic form." Kaganovich noted that the pronounced psychological depth of Losenko's characters aligns his work with that of leading Russian portrait painters of the 18th century. According to Kaganovich, "for its vivid psychological structure of images, Losenko's 'Vladimir before Rogneda' became the first composition in the series of works within the Russian historical genre."

Discussing the artistic features of the painting Vladimir and Rogneda, art historian Alla Vereshchagina noted that it contains no more sentimentality or sensitivity than many Western European paintings from the latter half of the 18th century. Vereshchagina attributed this to the lingering traditions of the Baroque style, marked by its characteristic pathos and dramatic qualities. At the same time, according to Vereshchagina, in Vladimir and Rogneda “one also senses a striving for classical clarity, balance, and rationality,” qualities inherent in the emerging artistic style of Classicism, which Losenko significantly helped to introduce into Russian painting.

According to art historian Nonna Yakovleva, the painting Vladimir and Rogneda "was 'destined' for both acclaim and criticism". On one hand, it was a long-awaited work focused on Russian history; on the other hand, certain elements within it raised doubts, particularly the lack of pathos in the main character (despite his emotional portrayal) and the "denseness and flatness of the composition," which conflicted with academic conventions.

== Bibliography ==
- Anisimov, E.V. (2020). 100 kartin russkoy istorii 100 картин русской истории [100 paintings of Russian history] (in Russian). Saint Petersburg: Arka. ISBN 978-5-91208-411-9.
- Baiburova, R.M. (2018). "Pervye khudozhestvennye publichnye vystavki v Rossii (Imperatorskaya Akademiya khudozhestv, XVIII vek)" Первые художественные публичные выставки в России (Императорская Академия художеств, XVIII век) [The first art public exhibitions in Russia (Imperial Academy of Arts, 18th century)] (PDF). Dizayn Revyu (in Russian) (1–4): 6–20.
- Vereshchagina, A.G. (1973). Khudozhnik. Vremya. Istoriya. Ocherki russkoy istoricheskoy zhivopisi XVIII — nachala XX veka Художник. Время. История. Очерки русской исторической живописи XVIII — начала XX века [Artist. Time. History. Sketches of Russian historical painting of the 18th - early 20th century] (in Russian). Leningrad: Iskusstvo (Leningrad division).
- Gavrilova, E.I. (1964). "Dve gruppy novykh risunkov A. P. Losenko v sobraniyakh Gosudarstvennogo Russkogo muzeya i Muzeya Akademii khudozhestv SSSR" Две группы новых рисунков А. П. Лосенко в собраниях Государственного Русского музея и Музея Академии художеств СССР [Two groups of new drawings by A. P. Losenko in the collections of the State Russian Museum and the Museum of the Academy of Arts of the USSR]. Reports of the State Russian Museum (in Russian). VIII. Leningrad: Iskusstvo: 27–37.
- Gavrilova, E.I. (1977). Anton Pavlovich Losenko Антон Павлович Лосенко [Anton Pavlovich Losenko]. Massovaya biblioteka po iskusstvu (in Russian). Leningrad: Khudozhnik RSFSR.
- Gavrilova, E.I. (1983). Russky risunok XVIII veka Русский рисунок XVIII века [Russian drawing of the 18th century] (in Russian). Leningrad: Khudozhnik RSFSR.
- Kaganovich, A.L. (1963). Anton Losenko i russkoye iskusstvo serediny XVIII stoletiya Антон Лосенко и русское искусство середины XVIII столетия [Anton Losenko and Russian art of the mid-18th century] (in Russian). Moscow: Publishing house of the Academy of Arts of the USSR.
- Karev, A.A. (2003). Klassitsizm v russkoy zhivopisi Классицизм в русской живописи [Classicism in Russian painting]. Entsiklopediya mirovogo iskusstva (in Russian). Moscow: Bely Gorod. ISBN 5-7793-0688-5.
- Komelova, G.N. (1990). "Otdel istorii russkoy kultury" Отдел истории русской культуры [Department of History of Russian Culture]. Ermitazh. Istoriya i sovremennost. 1764—1988 Эрмитаж. История и современность. 1764—1988 [The Hermitage. History and Modernity. 1764-1988] (in Russian). V.A. Suslov. Moscow: Iskusstvo. pp. 252–274. ISBN 5-210-00010-9.
- Korshunova, T.T. (2004). "Peterburgskiye shpalery v Ermitazhe" Петербургские шпалеры в Эрмитаже [St Petersburg trellises in the Hermitage Museum]. Nashe Naslediye (in Russian) (69): 36–49.
- Kuznetsova, E.V. (1972). Besedy o russkom iskusstve XVIII — nachala XIX veka Беседы о русском искусстве XVIII — начала XIX века [Talks about Russian art of the 18th - early 19th century] (in Russian). Moscow: Prosveshcheniye.
- Maykov, Vasily (1966). Izbrannye proizvedeniya Избранные произведения [Selected Works]. Библиотека поэта (in Russian). A.V. Zapadov. Moscow - Leningrad: Sovetsky Pisatel.
- Olenin, Alexey (1829). Kratkoye istoricheskoye svedeniye o sostoyanii Imperatorskoy Akademii khudozhestv s 1764-go po 1829-y god Краткое историческое сведение о состоянии Императорской Академии художеств с 1764-го по 1829-й год [Brief historical information on the state of the Imperial Academy of Arts from 1764 to 1829] (in Russian). Saint Petersburg: Typography of I. Glazunov.
- Otryshko, A.О. (2012). "Grafika Antona Pavlovicha Losenko (1737—1773): inostrannye vliyaniya i natsionalnoye svoyeobraziye" Графика Антона Павловича Лосенко (1737—1773): иностранные влияния и национальное своеобразие [Graphics of Anton Pavlovich Losenko (1737-1773): foreign influences and national originality] (PDF). Aktualnye problemy teorii i istorii iskusstva II (in Russian). Saint Petersburg: NP-Print: 376–381. ISBN 978-5-91542-185-0.
- Petinova, E.F. (2001). Russkiye khudozhniki XVIII — nachala XX veka Русские художники XVIII — начала XX века [Russian artists of the 18th - early 20th century] (in Russian). Saint Petersburg: Aurora. ISBN 978-5-7300-0714-7.
- Petinova, E.F. (2008). "Losenko Anton Pavlovich" Лосенко Антон Павлович [Losenko Anton Pavlovich]. Russkiye zhivopistsy XVIII—XIX veka. Biografichesky slovar Русские живописцы XVIII—XIX века. Биографический словарь [Russian painters of the 18th-19th centuries. Biographical dictionary] (in Russian). Saint Petersburg: Azbuka-Klassika. pp. 382–386. ISBN 978-5-91181-923-1.
- Petrov, Pyotr (1864). "Russkiye istoricheskiye zhivopistsy. I. Anton Pavlovich Losenko" Русские исторические живописцы. I. Антон Павлович Лосенко [Russian historical painters. I. Anton Pavlovich Losenko]. Severnoye Siyaniye (in Russian). 3: 142–151.
- Romanovsky, A.S. (2005). Akademizm v russkoy zhivopisi Академизм в русской живописи [Academism in Russian painting]. Entsiklopediya mirovogo iskusstva (in Russian). Moscow: Bely Gorod. ISBN 5-7793-0904-3.
- Savinov, A.N. (1948). Anton Pavlovich Losenko Антон Павлович Лосенко [Anton Pavlovich Losenko]. Massovaya biblioteka «Iskusstvo» (in Russian). Moscow: Iskusstvo.
- Savinov, A.N. (1961). "Istoricheskaya zhivopis" Историческая живопись [Historical painting]. Istoriya russkogo iskusstva История русского искусства [History of Russian Art] (in Russian). Vol. 7. Igor Grabar, Vladimir Kemenov, Viktor Lazarev. Moscow: Nauka. pp. 162–192.
- Savinov, A.N.; Zhidkov, G.V. (1952). "Anton Pavlovich Losenko" Антон Павлович Лосенко [Anton Pavlovich Losenko]. Russkoye Iskusstvo: Ocherki O Zhizni I Tvorchestve Khudozhnikov. Vosemnadtsaty Vek (in Russian). A.I. Leonov. Moscow: Iskusstvo: 97–122.
- Sharaya, N.М. (1958). "Russkaya shpalera kontsa XVIII v. «Vladimir i Rogneda»" Русская шпалера конца XVIII в. «Владимир и Рогнеда» [Russian trellis of the late 18th century. ‘Vladimir and Rogneda’] (PDF). Soobshcheniya Gosudarstvennogo Ermitazha (in Russian). XIII. Leningrad: Iskusstvo: 36–38.
- Ernst, S.R. (1914). "A. P. Losenko" А. П. Лосенко [A.P. Losenko]. Starye Gody (in Russian) (1): 1–24.
- Yakovleva, N.A. (2005). Istoricheskaya kartina v russkoy zhivopisi Историческая картина в русской живописи [Historical painting in Russian painting]. Entsiklopediya mirovogo iskusstva (in Russian). Moscow: Bely Gorod. ISBN 5-7793-0898-5.
- Gosudarstvennaya Tretyakovskaya galereya — katalog sobraniya Государственная Третьяковская галерея — каталог собрания [State Tretyakov Gallery - catalogue of the collection] (in Russian). Vol. 2: 18th century painting. Y.V. Bruk, L.I. Iovleva. Moscow: State Tretyakov Gallery. 2015. ISBN 978-5-89580-070-6.
- Gosudarstvenny Russky muzey — Zhivopis, XVIII — nachalo XX veka (katalog) Государственный Русский музей — Живопись, XVIII — начало XX века (каталог) [State Russian Museum - Painting, 18th - early 20th century (catalogue)] (in Russian). A.V. Gubarev, N.N. Novouspensky, V.A. Pushkaryov, G.V. Smirnov. Leningrad: Aurora and Iskusstvo. 1980.
- Gosudarstvenny Russky muzey — katalog sobraniya Государственный Русский музей — каталог собрания [State Russian Museum - catalogue of the collection] (in Russian). Vol. 1: 18th century painting. G.N. Goldovsky. Saint Petersburg: Palace Editions. 1998.
- Imperatorskaya Akademiya khudozhestv. Muzey. Russkaya zhivopis Императорская Академия художеств. Музей. Русская живопись [The Imperial Academy of Arts. Museum. Russian painting] (in Russian). S.K. Isakov. Petrograd: Union. 1915.
