= Maria Ananina =

Russian stage actress

Maria Ananina (d. after 1756), was a Russian stage actress. She was one of the two first recorded professional actresses in Russia.

Maria Ananina was the daughter of an officer Ananin. In 1756, the Imperial Theatres was founded in Saint Petersburg by the empress Elizabeth of Russia. Previously, foreign actresses had performed in Russia in the French, Italian and German theater companies that visited Russia, but the acting profession had not been practiced by Russian women. A proclamation from the Russian Senate 30 August 1756 allowed for the hiring of women actors to the newly founded Russian theatre, and directly afterward, the first two actresses was hired. Maria Ananina and her sister Olga Ananina, who thereby became the first professional actresses in Russia; shortly after, they were joined by Agrafena Musina-Pushkina.

At that time, the acting profession had a low status with female actors often subjected to slander of prostitution, and all of the three actresses therefore married shortly after; Maria and Olga married their colleagues Fyodor Volkov and Yakov Shumsky respectively.
