= Anton Losenko =

Russian painter

- Born: Антон Павлович Лосенко; 10 August [O.S. 30 July] 1737; Hlukhiv, Kiev Governorate, Russian Empire (now Ukraine)
- Died: 4 December [O.S. 23 November] 1773 (aged 36); Saint Petersburg, Russian Empire
- Education: Imperial Academy of Arts
- Known for: History and portrait painting
- Movement: Neoclassicism
- Elected: Member Academy of Arts (1770)
- Patrons: Dmitry Golitsyn

Anton Pavlovich Losenko (Russian: Антон Павлович Лосенко; 10 August [O.S. 30 July] 1737 – 4 December [O.S. 23 November] 1773) was a Russian neoclassical painter and academician who specialized in historical subjects and portraits. He was one of the founders of the Imperial Russian historical movement in painting.

== Life and work ==
Anton Losenko was born to the family of a Russian negotiant Pavel Yakovlevich Losev in Hlukhiv, in the region of Chernihovshchyna (now in Sumy Oblast, Ukraine). He became an orphan and at the age of seven was sent to a Court Choir in Saint Petersburg. In 1753, as he had lost his voice but had shown talent for painting, he was sent for apprenticeship to the artist Ivan Argunov. After five and a half years of apprenticeship, he was admitted to the Imperial Academy of Arts in 1759. Among the paintings he created there was the Portrait of Ivan Shuvalov (1760) and the Portrait of Alexander Sumarokov (1760). In 1760, the Academy sent him to Paris to study art under the French neoclassical painter Jean Restout the Younger. There he painted a large painting based on the New Testament story of the miraculous catch of fish. In 1766-1769 Losenko worked in Rome, studying Italian art, especially the paintings of Raphael. There he created his two paintings of Kain and Abel.

In 1769, Losenko returned to Saint-Petersburg. He received an offer to present a historical painting as a way of receiving Academician status in the Imperial Academy of Arts. From an episode of Kievan Rus' history, he painted his classical canvas of Vladimir I of Kiev and Rogneda of Polotsk. This painting not only brought him the title of Academician but also a professorship position at the Imperial Academy (initially, in 1770, an adjunct-professor, but from 1772 a full professor and director of the Academy). While in this position Losenko wrote a text book called "Short Explanation of the Human Proportions" that served a few generations of painters in the Russian Empire. He worked as the Director of the Academy until his death in 1773.

== Recognition and impact ==
Anton Losenko is regarded as one of the founders of the Imperial Russian historical movement in painting and together with his textbook (which was used until the mid-19th century), he influenced the education of art in the Russian Empire. Painters Ivan Akimov and Grigory Ugrymov and sculptor Mikhail Kozlovsky studied under him.

Losenko was one of the painters honoured by having his work appear on Soviet postage stamps, with his Portrait of Fyodor Volkov appearing in 1972.

== Portraits ==
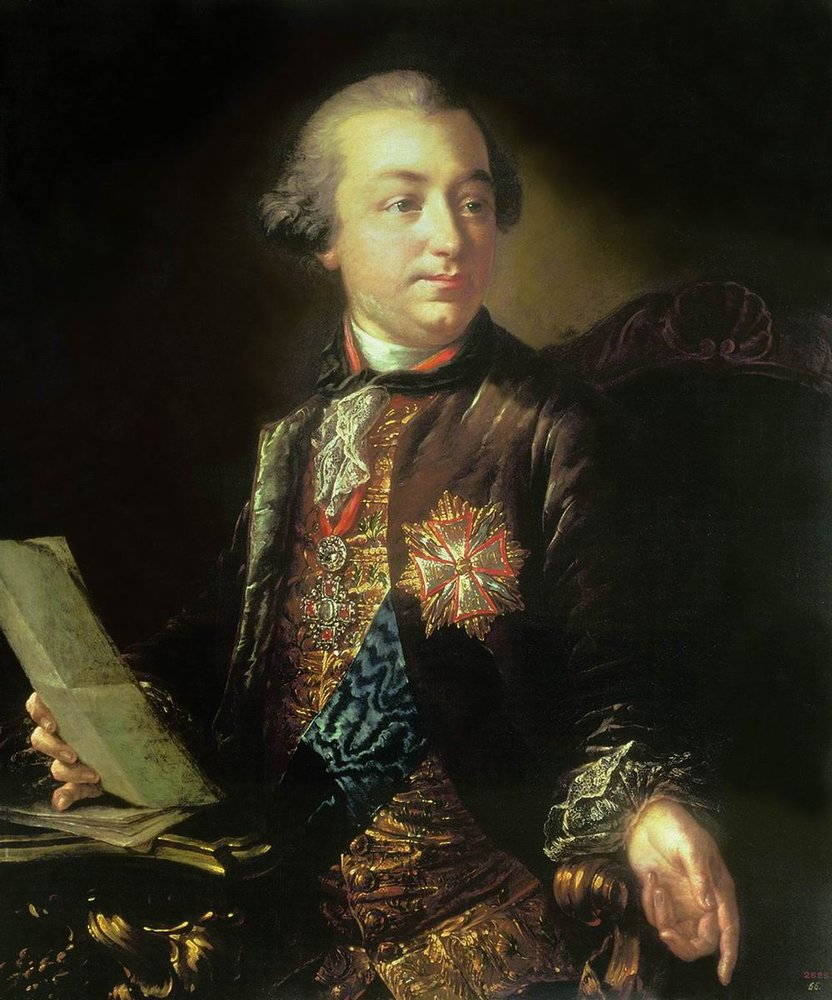
Ivan Shuvalov (1760)

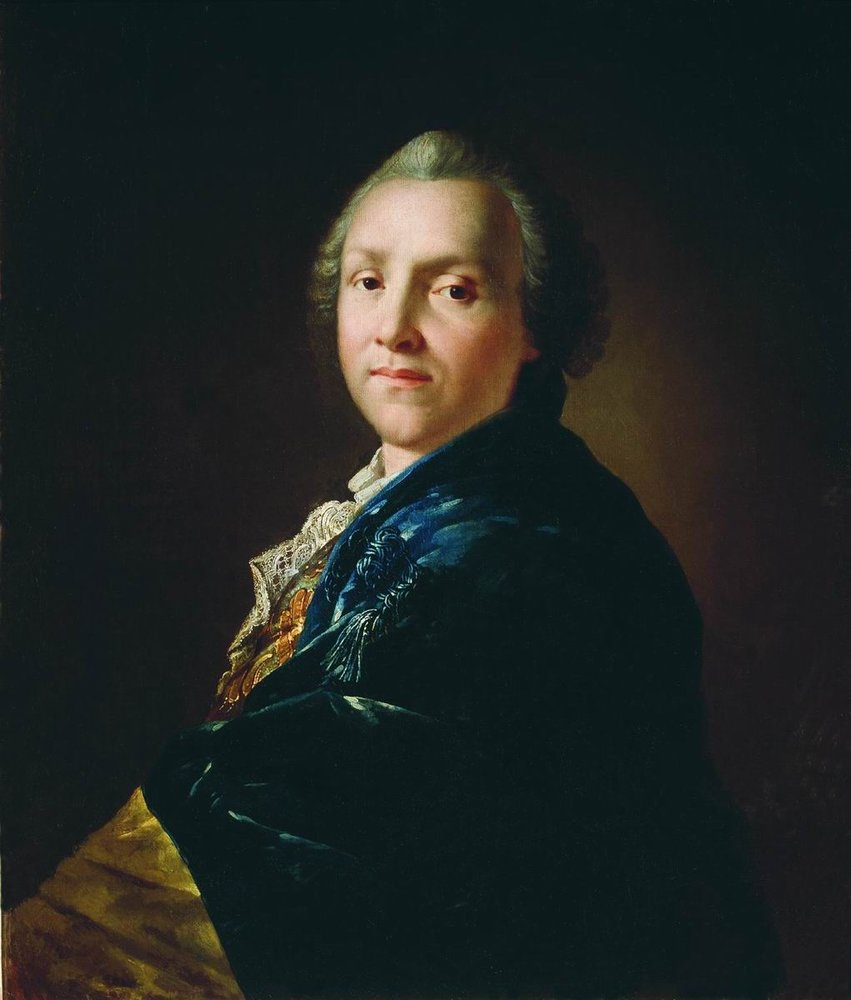
Alexander Sumarokov (1760)

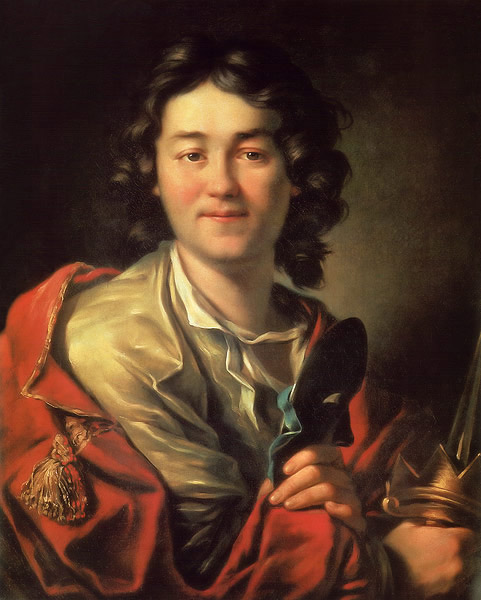
Fyodor Volkov (1763)

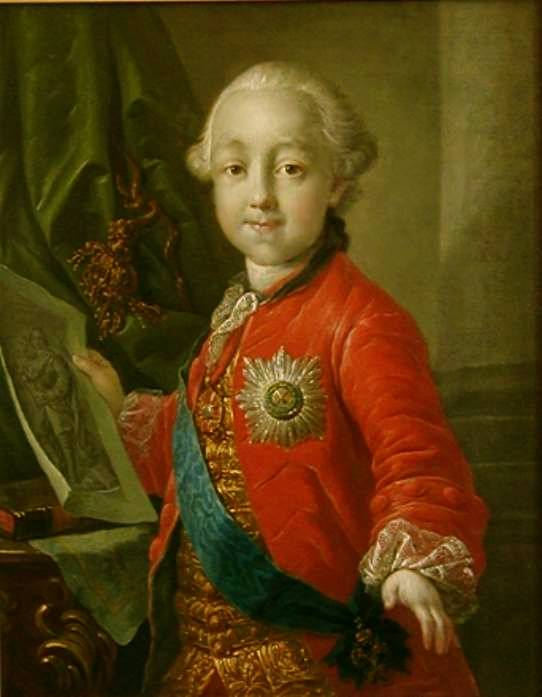
Paul I as a Child (1760s)

== Neoclassical works ==
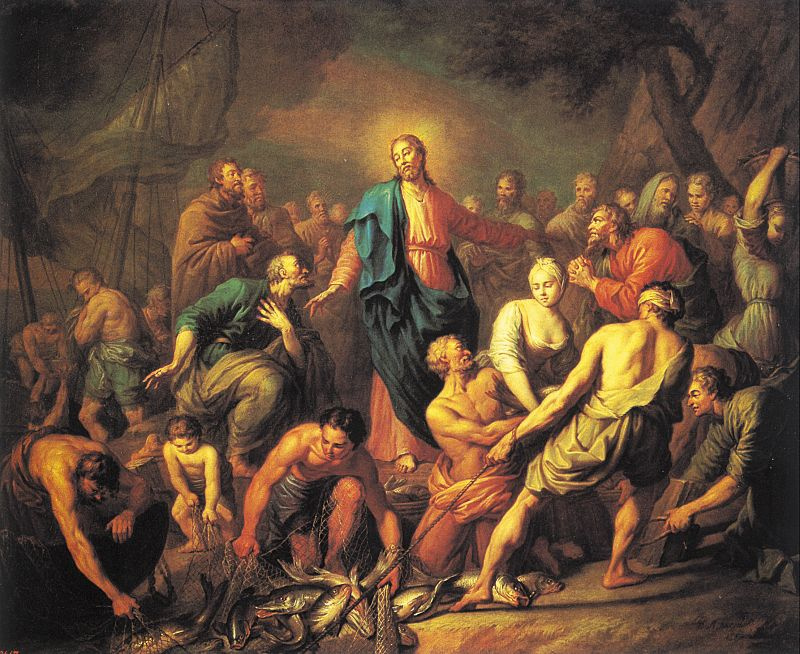
Miraculous Catch (1762)

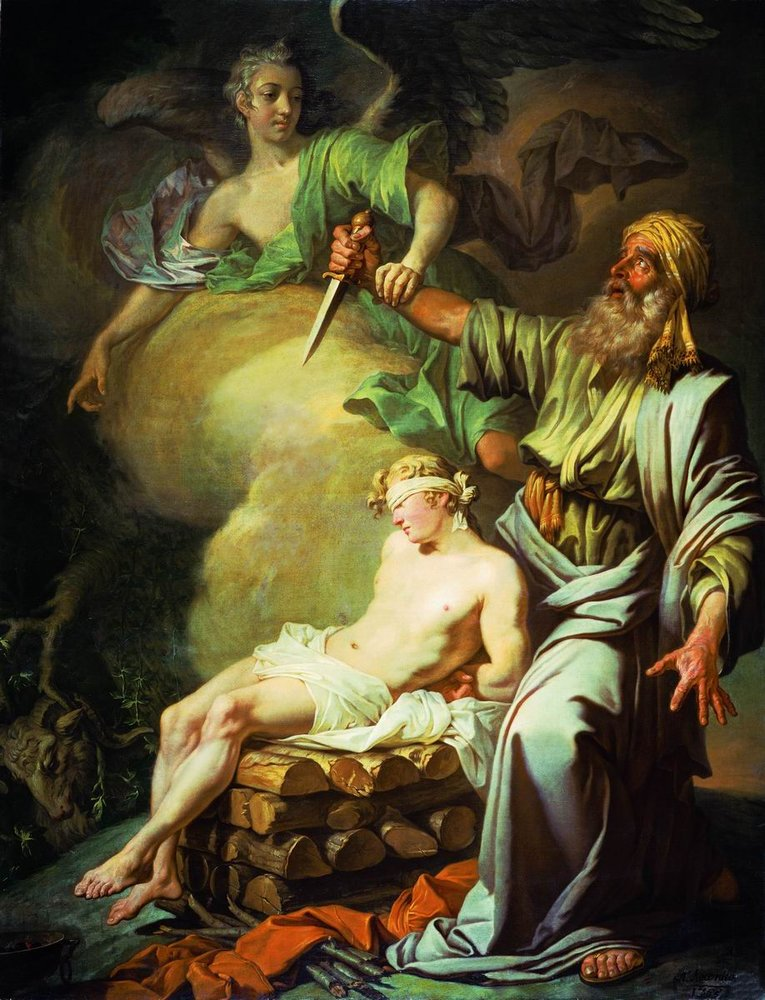
The Sacrifice of Isaac (1765)

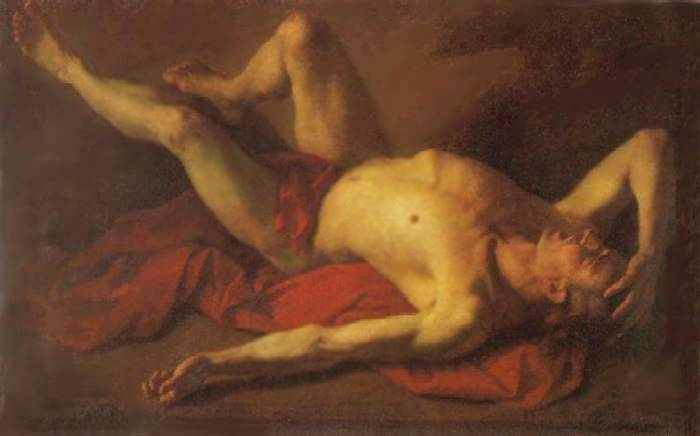
Abel (1768)

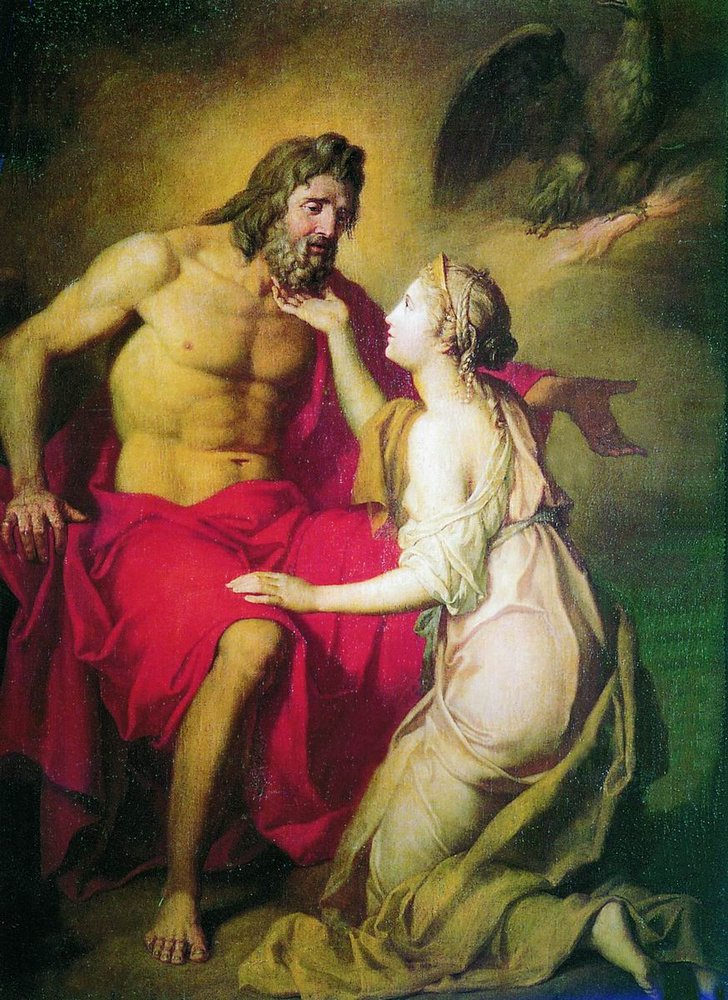
Thetis and Zeus (1769)

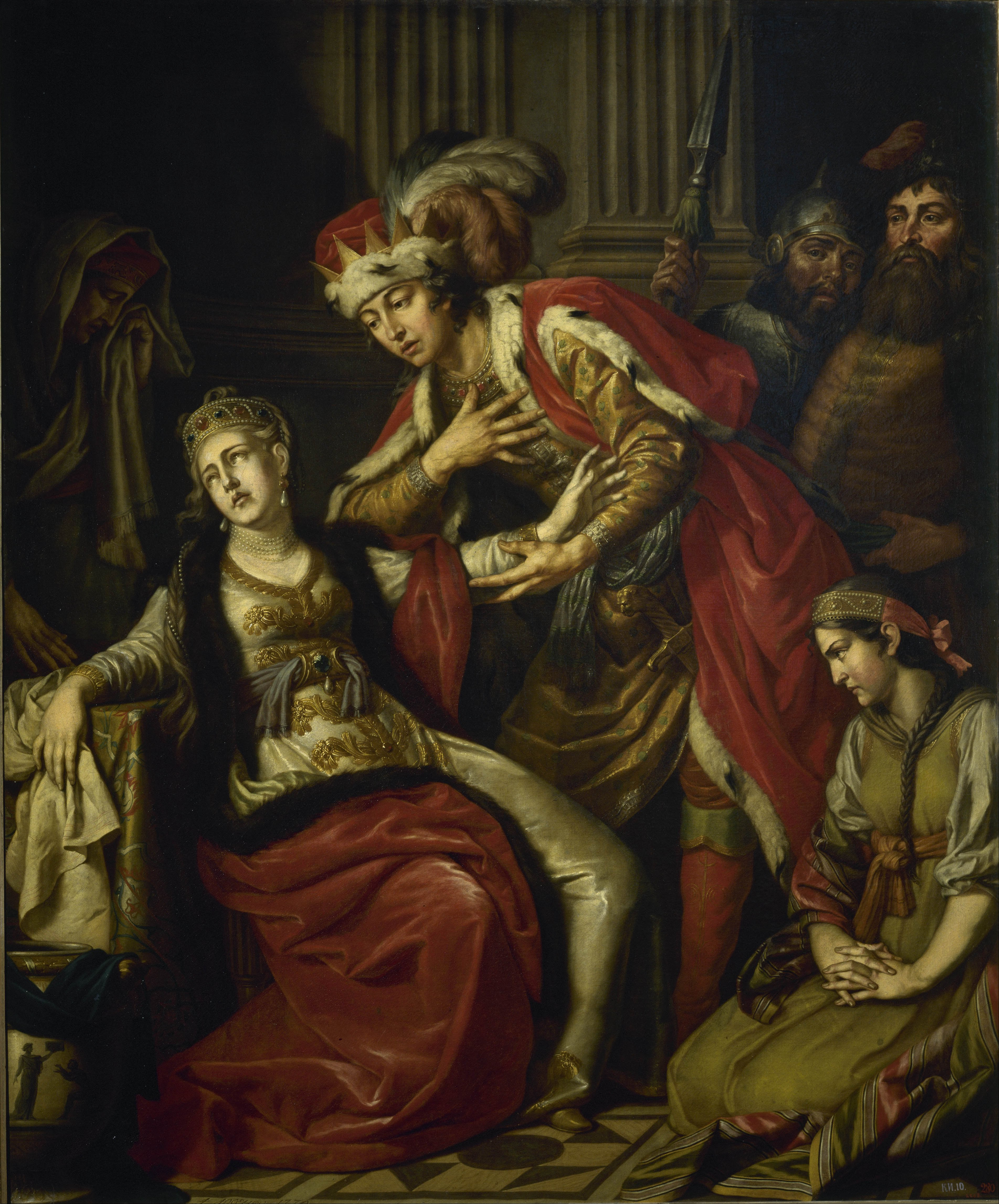
Vladimir and Rogneda (1770)

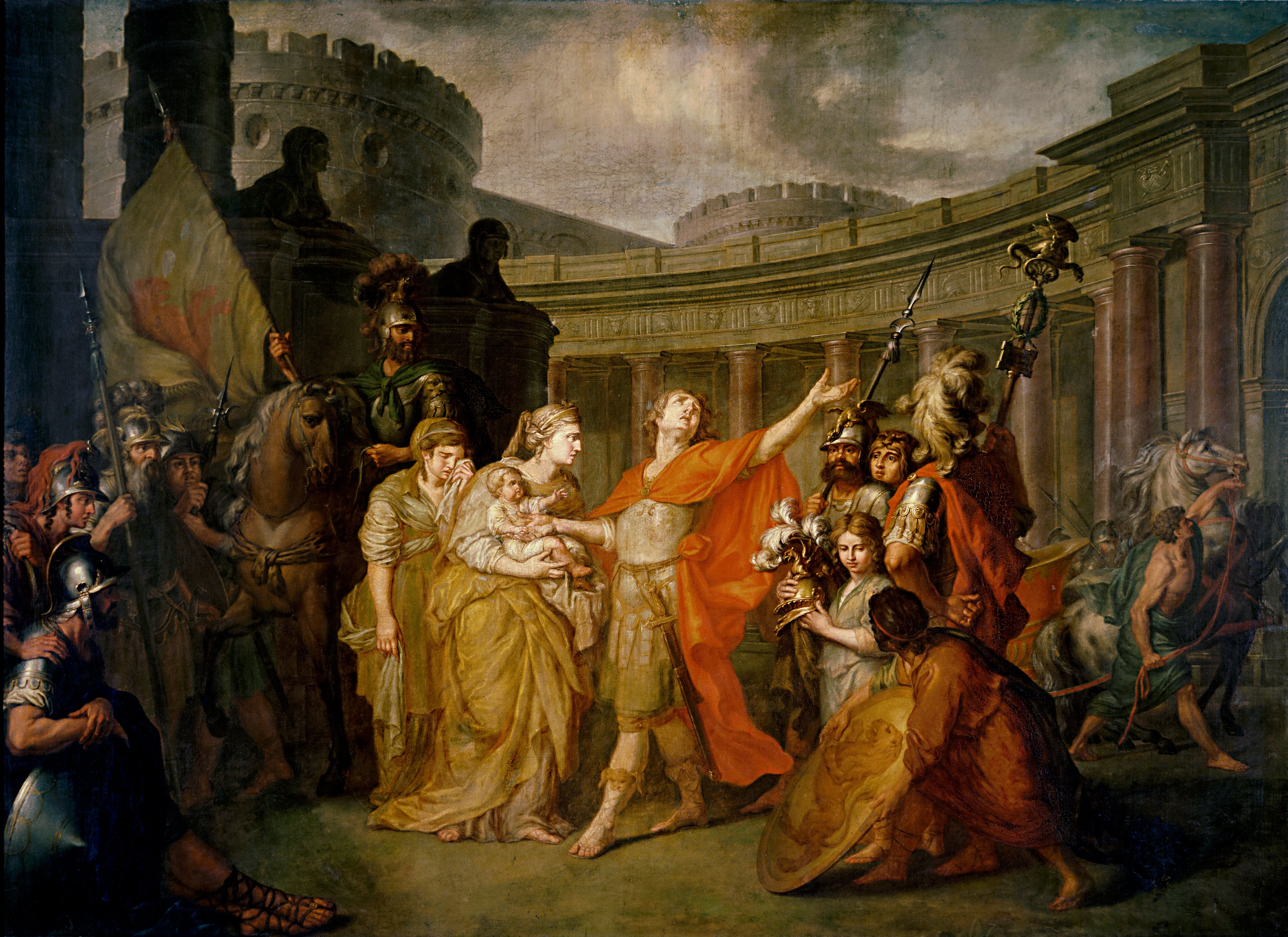
Farewell of Hector and Andromache (1773)
