= Fyodor Volkov =

Russian actor

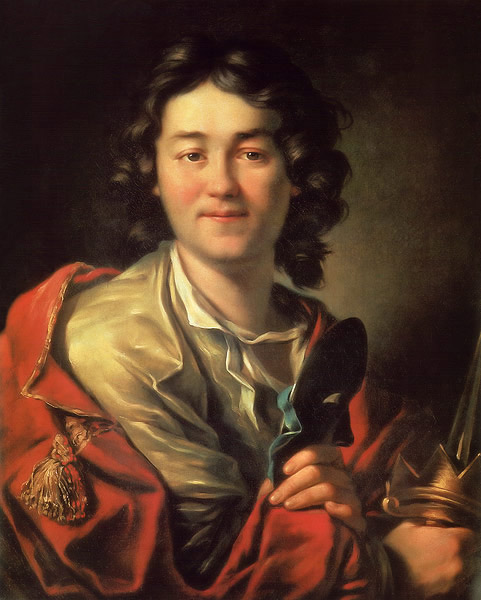
- Fyodor Volkov by Anton Losenko
- Born: 1729; Kostroma, Russian Empire
- Died: 1763 (aged 33–34); Moscow, Russian Empire
- Occupation: Actor

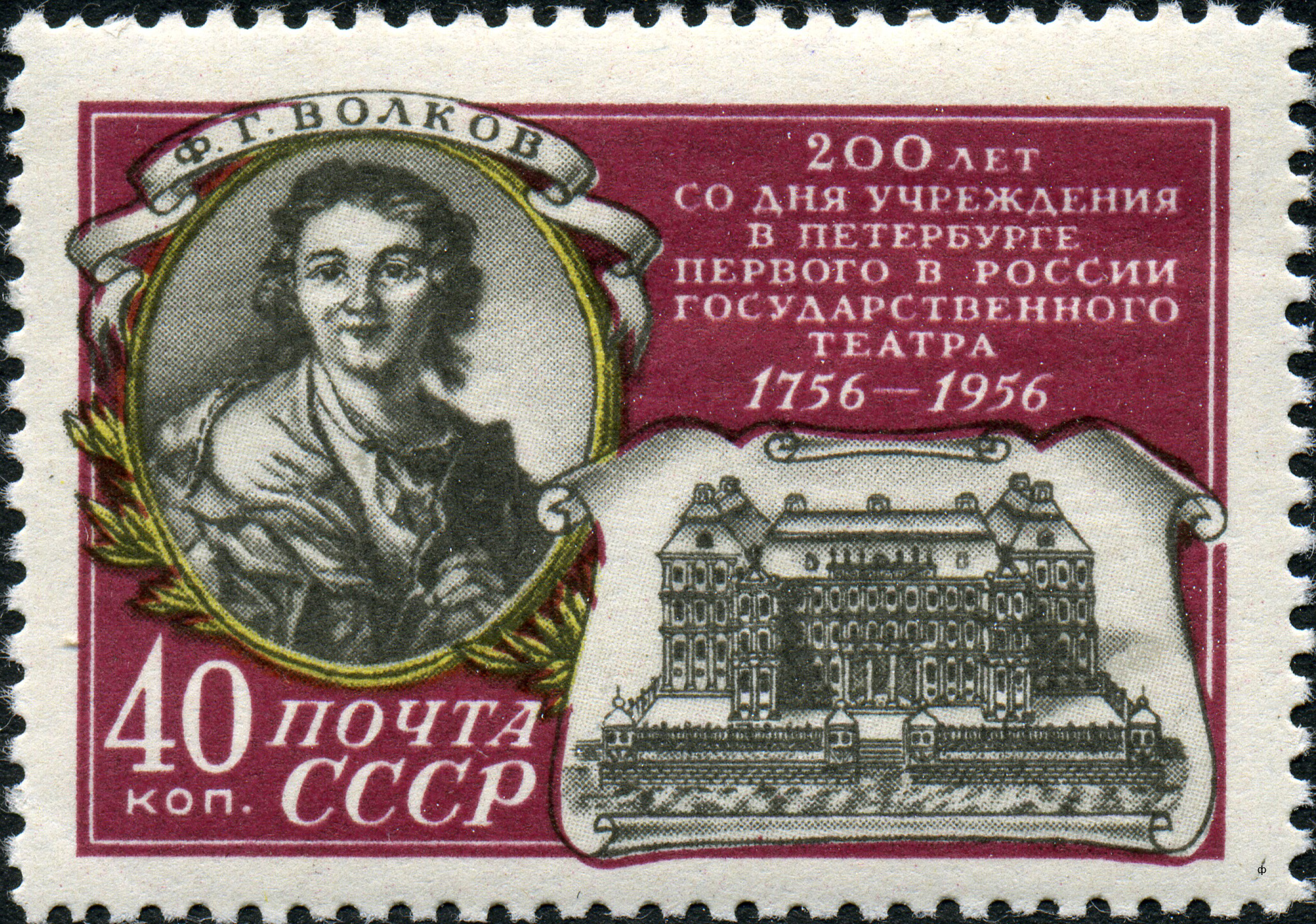
Volkov on a 1956 stamp

Fyodor Grigorievich Volkov (Russian: Фёдор Григорьевич Волков) (20 February [O.S. 9 February] 1729 in Kostroma – 15 April [O.S. 4 April] 1763 in Moscow) was a Russian actor and founder of the first permanent Russian theater.

== Life ==
The stepson of Merchant Polushkin from Kostroma, Fyodor Volkov received a versatile education. He established the very first public theater in Yaroslavl in 1750, which would later bring fame to the then-unknown actors Ivan Dmitrievsky, Yakov Shumsky and others. Two years later, Fyodor Volkov and his theater were invited by Empress Elizabeth to perform at her court, but it would soon be dismissed due to its "plebeian" nature. Some of the actors were sent to the Szlachta Corps (Шляхетный корпус) to get education.

In 1756, the empress issued a decree on the establishment of the first permanent public theatre in St.Petersburg under the guidance of Alexander Sumarokov. Fyodor Volkov assisted Sumarokov in managing the theater and five years later became its director after the latter's resignation. Volkov created the Russian professional public theater of national significance, tied it together with progressive dramatic art, and paved the way for a number of Russian actors. He married one of the first actresses in Russia, Maria Ananina.

As an actor, Fyodor Volkov mostly played tragic roles, such as the ones in Sumarokov's plays Khorev (Хорев), The Refuge of Virtue (Прибежище добродетели), Gamlet (Гамлет; Sumarokov's version of Shakespeare's Hamlet), Semira (Семира), Sinav and Truvor (Синав и Трувор), Yaropolk and Demiza (Ярополк и Демиза). Having mastered the art of stage acting, Volkov often deviated from esthetic canons of classicism and chose not to follow the universally accepted rules of solemn recitation. In his plays, Sumarokov would often create characters with Volkov's wild temperament in mind. The latter, however, was a very talented comedian, as well.

== Legacy ==
The Yaroslavl Theatre has been bearing Volkov's name since 1911.
