= Ivan Dmitrevsky =

Russian actor

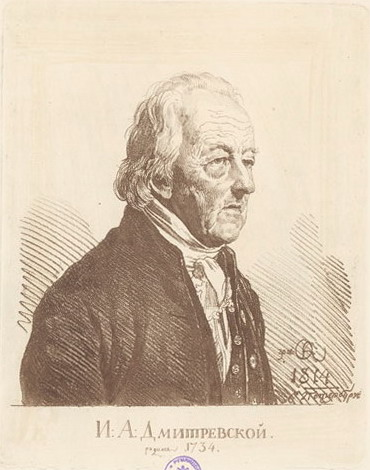

Ivan Afanasyevich Dmitrevsky (Russian: Ива́н Афана́сьевич Дмитре́вский) (February 28, 1734 in Yaroslavl – October 27, 1821 in Saint Petersburg) is generally regarded as the most influential actor of Russian Neoclassicism and "Russia's first great tragedian".

Together with his friend Fyodor Volkov he inaugurated the first Russian theatre in his native Yaroslavl (1750), later moving with the rest of the troupe to St Petersburg (1756). His tragic parts in Alexander Sumarokov's plays were admired by Catherine the Great and her friend Ekaterina Dashkova. Later, he delivered lectures on theatre in the Russian Academy, of which he was a member. In his writings and plays, Dmitrevsky emphasized reason over emotions, propagating "the loud, artificial declamatory acting style" of French Neoclassicism.

Stage actress and singer Agrafena Musina-Pushkina (1740–1782/86) studied with him, and later became his wife.
