= Agrafena Musina-Pushkina =

Russian opera singer

Agrafena Musina-Pushkina (1740–1782/86) was a Russian stage actress and opera singer. She belonged to the pioneer group of first professional actors in Russia.

== Life and career ==
Agrafena Musina-Pushkina was the student and spouse of actor Ivan Dmitrevsky. She was engaged active at the Imperial Theatres in Saint Petersburg from their foundation in 1756 until 1769. She mainly played the parts of soubrettes and queens. She was also active as a singer.
