= Farewell of Hector and Andromache =

1773 painting by Anton Losenko

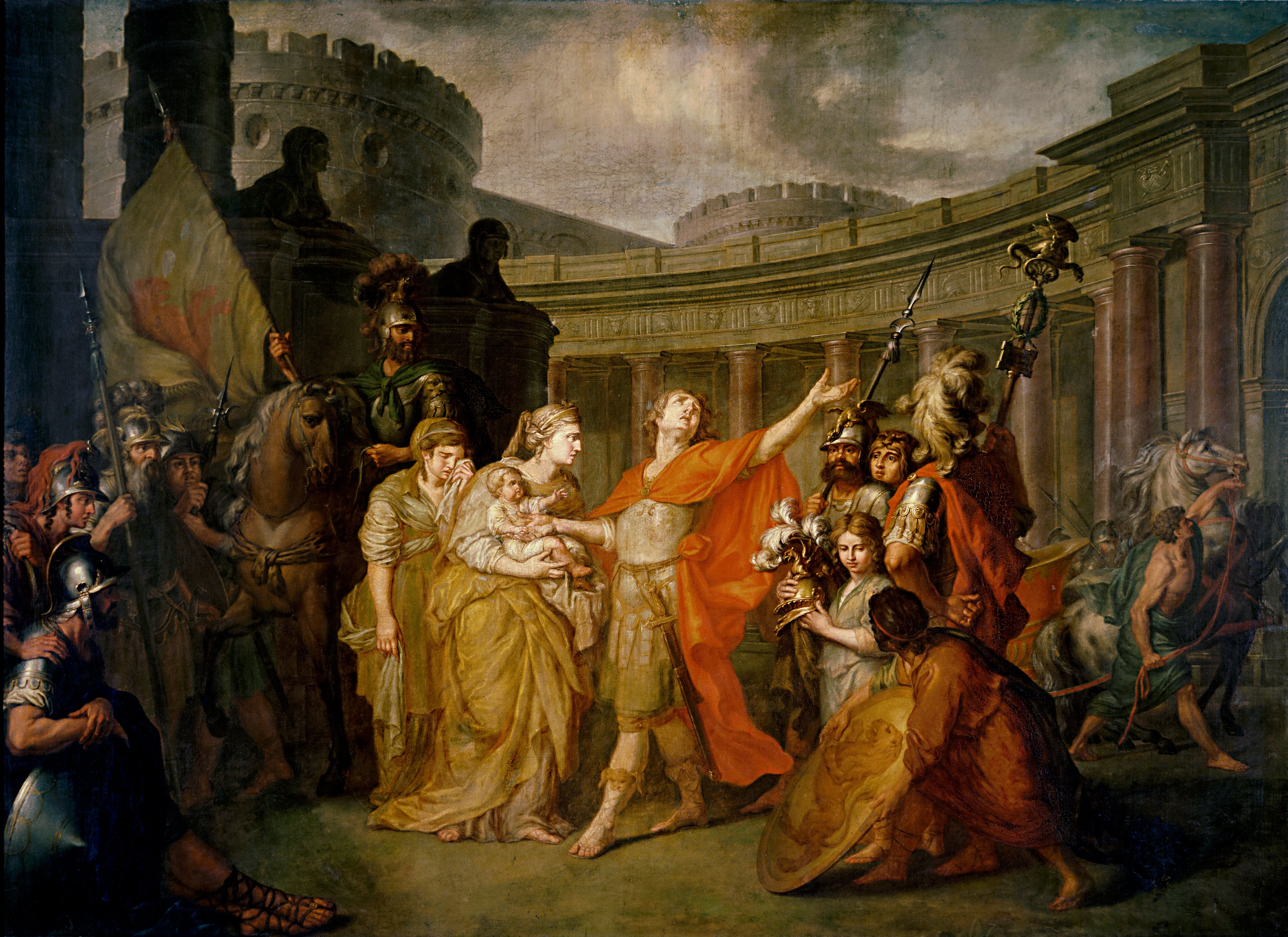
- Artist: Anton Losenko
- Year: 1773
- Medium: Oil on canvas
- Dimensions: 156,3 cm × 212,5 cm (615 in × 837 in)
- Location: Tretyakov Gallery, Moscow

Farewell of Hector to Andromache is a painting by the Russian artist Anton Losenko (1737–1773), painted in 1773. From 1925, the painting is in the Tretyakov Gallery (Inventory No. 5814). The dimensions of the canvas are 156.3 × 212.5 cm. The subject of the painting is linked to the account of the Trojan War as described in the Iliad, namely the farewell of Hector, the commander-in-chief of the Trojans, with his wife Andromache and their son Astyanax. The artist combines the theme of farewell to the family of the Trojan hero going to battle with the Greeks with the theme of patriotic exploits and civic duty.

The canvas was created at the behest of Empress Catherine II. Some elements of the painting remained unfinished due to the artist's death at the age of 36, caused by hydrops. Following Losenko's passing, his students adopted the distinctive construction of the painting Farewell of Hector and Andromache and subsequently "developed [it] into an unwritten system of compositional thinking that influenced the subsequent history of Russian historical painting." For half a century, the canvas was regarded as "the standard of historical classicist painting" in Russian painting.

Art historian Avraam Kaganovich, the primary biographer of Losenko during the Soviet era, described Farewell of Hector and Andromache as a mature work that exemplifies the artist's "high professional abilities as a composer, draughtsman and painter". In the opinion of art historian Nonna Yakovleva, the painting Farewell of Hector and Andromache can serve as "an ideal textbook illustrating the compositional, colouristic and ideological principles of classicism" even in the 21st century.

== History ==
In 1758, Anton Losenko commenced his studies at the Imperial Academy of Arts, which had been established in 1757. His mentors were the French artists Louis-Joseph Le Lorrain, Jean Louis de Velli and Louis-Jean-François Lagrenée, who were invited to Russia by the Academy's curator, Ivan Shuvalov. In 1760, Losenko was dispatched as a pensioner of the Academy to Paris, where he refined his skills under the guidance of the artist Jean Restout the Younger, who was then director of the Royal Academy of Painting and Sculpture. At the conclusion of 1762, Losenko returned to Russia. However, his pension was subsequently extended, and in 1763 he once again relocated to France, where he remained until 1765. During this period, he was mentored by Joseph-Marie Vien. At the conclusion of 1765, the Council of the Academy granted Losenko's petition to extend his pension for a period of three years. Consequently, the artist relocated from Paris to Rome.

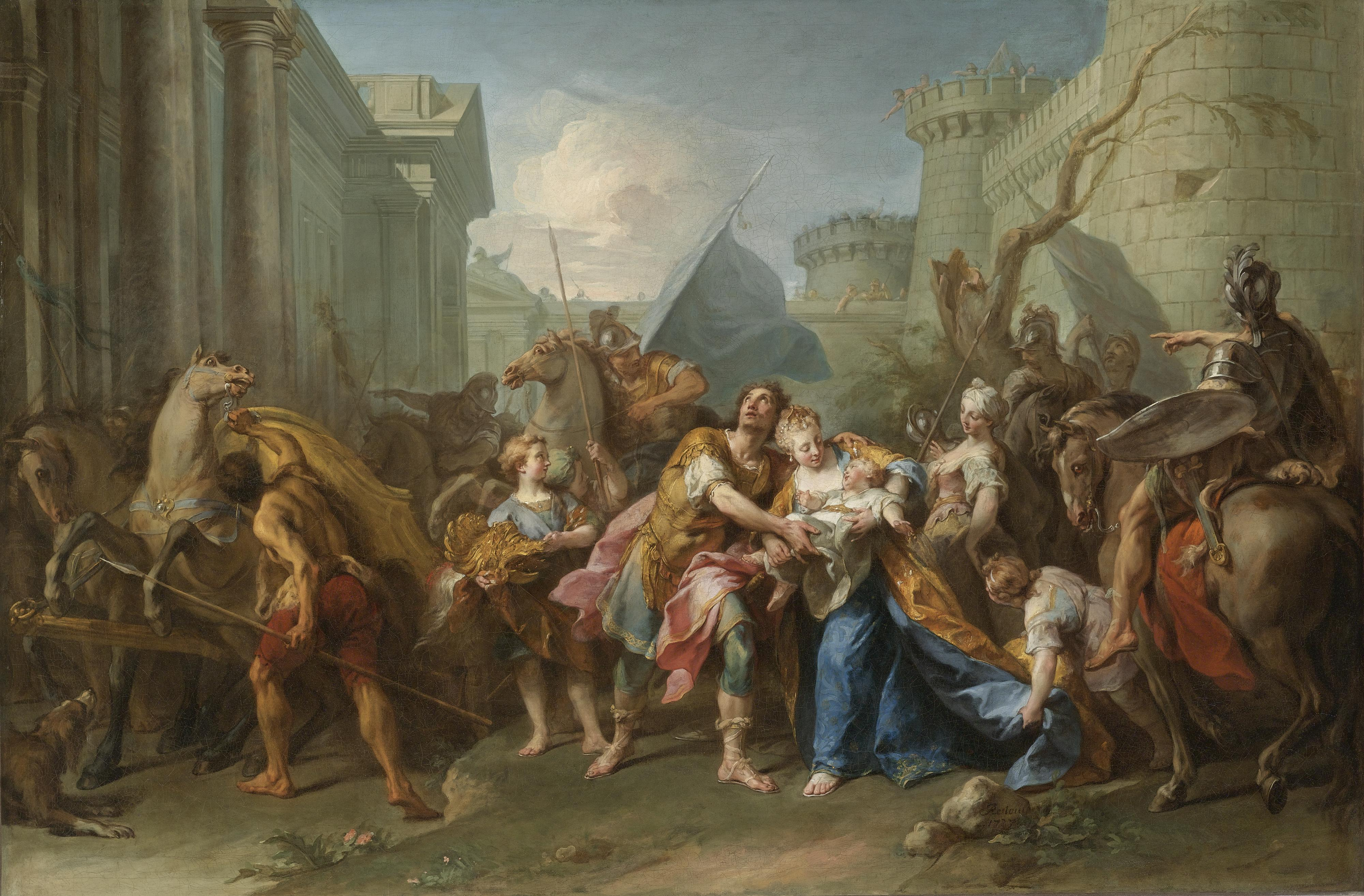
Jean Restout the Younger. Farewell of Hector and Andromache (1727)

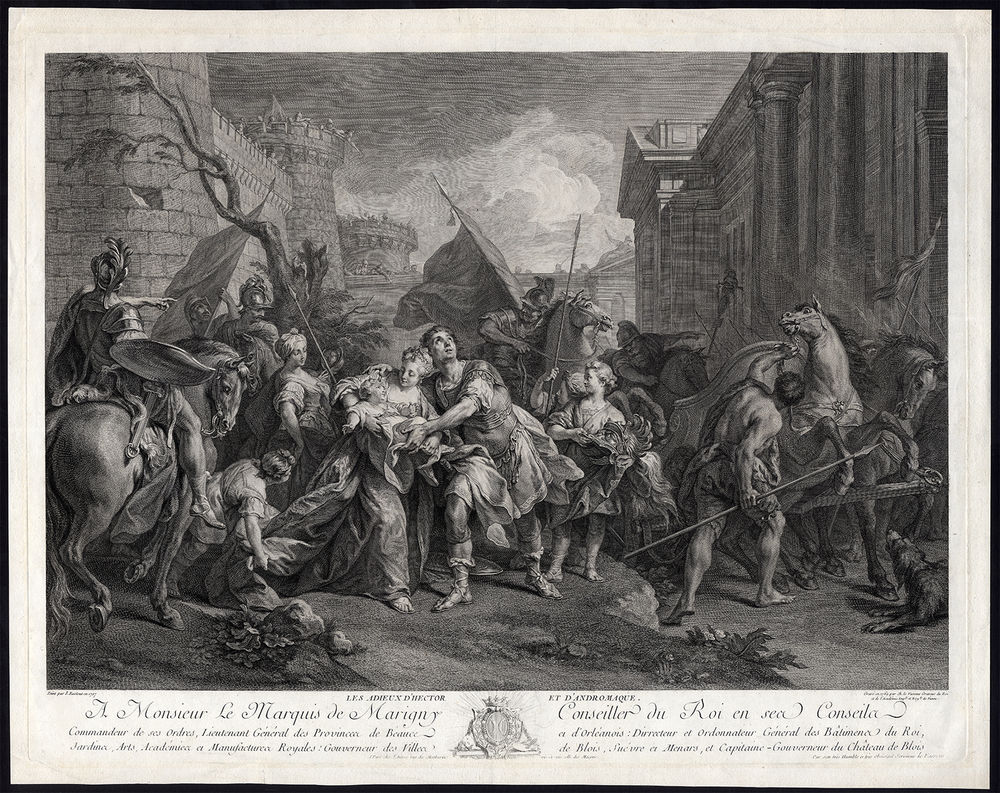
Jean-Charles Le Vasseur. Farewell of Hector and Andromache (engraving, 1769)

In 1769, Losenko returned to Russia. In the same year, he commenced work on the painting Vladimir and Rogneda, which became one of the first paintings on a subject from Russian history. The painting was completed in 1770, and for it the artist received the title of academician. Subsequently, Losenko became a professor at the Academy of Arts and assumed the role of head of the historical painting class. In 1772, he was additionally appointed as the director of the Academy of Arts, a position he held in conjunction with Nicolas-François Gillet.

Despite the considerable time and energy required to run the Academy and teach, Losenko continued his creative work. His subsequent (and, as it transpired, final) significant work was the painting Farewell of Hector and Andromache. The subject of this painting was based on the events of the Trojan War as described in the Iliad. It is known that the painting was commissioned by Empress Catherine II, and the artist worked on it in 1773, although, according to art historian Avraham Kaganovich, "there is no doubt that it was started earlier."

The prototype for the painting Farewell of Hector and Andromache was a painting of the same name by Jean Restoux the Younger, painted in 1727. He was Losenko's mentor during his retirement trip of 1760-1762. The engraving created by the French engraver Jean-Charles Le Vasseur in 1769 could be used as a point of reference for Restoux's painting for Losenko. In the course of creating the painting, Losenko consulted the French text of the Iliad from his personal library. This text was illustrated with engravings, one of which depicted the scene of Hector and Andromache's farewell.

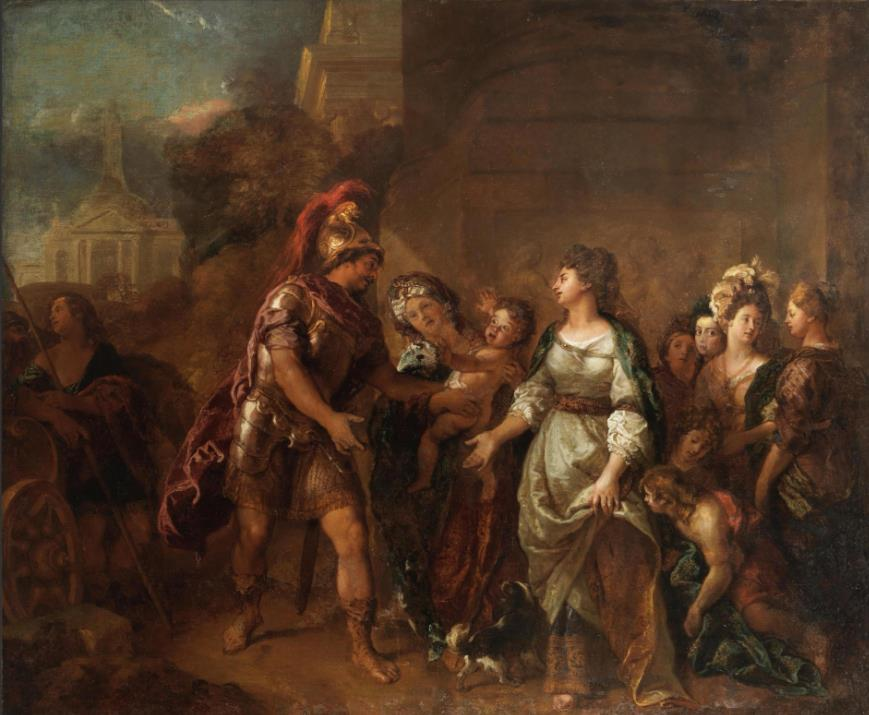
Charles de La Fosse. Farewell of Hector and Andromache (1699)

Additionally, Losenko possessed a copy of the 1757 French book Tableaux tirés de l'Iliade, de l'Odyssée d'Homère et de l'Enéide de Virgile, avec des observations sur le costume, written by Anne Claude de Caylus, in which the he, discussing the story of the farewell of Hector and Andromache, advised artists to adhere to the Homeric text and cited a painting by Charles de La Fosse as an example. It is also possible that Losenko may have consulted the work of the 13th-century Italian historian Guido delle Colonne, entitled Historia destructionis Troiae. At the time of painting, several editions of this work were already available in Russian. It is known that at least one of these editions was in the library of the Academy of Arts.

Losenko's painting was incomplete at the time of his death on 4 December [O.S. 23 November] 1773, which was attributed to hydrops. In the poem To the Deceased of the Academy of Arts Mr Professor and Director Anton Pavlovich Losenkov, which was intended as an epitaph, the poet Vasily Maykov wrote: "Andromache's unhappy farewell to Hector, / Not ended by thee, it seems so, / As she must be troubled with fear, / Her sorrow is alive with thee" (Russian: «Прощаясь с Гектором несчастна Андромаха, / Не конченна тобой, уж зрится такова, / Какою должно быть смущённой ей от страха — / Печаль её тобой представлена жива»). The painting remained on an easel in Losenko's studio until the very last days of his life. According to art historian Alexei Savinov, "the painting was almost finished".

For half a century, the painting Farewell of Hector and Andromache was regarded as "the standard of historical classicist painting" in Russian painting, until Fyodor Bruni painted his canvas Death of Camilla, Sister of Horatius in 1824.

The painting Farewell of Hector and Andromache was previously housed in the Museum of the Imperial Academy of Arts. Following the revolution, it was transferred to the State Museum Fund. In 1924, it was transferred to the Tretyakov Gallery. The canvas was exhibited at the following exhibitions: At the Origins of Russian Painting (State Tretyakov Gallery, Moscow, 1925), Russian Historical Painting (State Tretyakov Gallery, Moscow, 1939), 225 Years of the Academy of Arts (Moscow, 1983–1984), as well as at Losenko's retrospective exhibition held in 1987-1988 at the State Russian Museum in Leningrad.

== Description ==
=== Subject ===
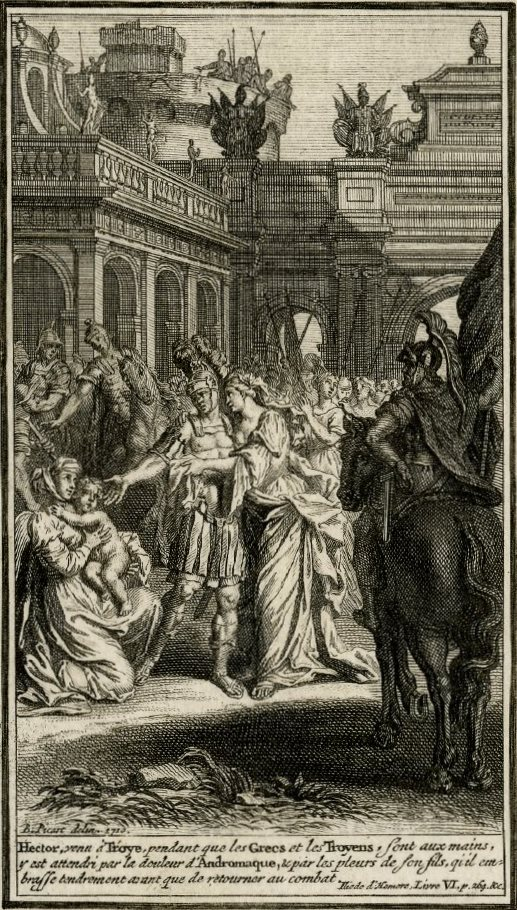
Bernard Picart. Farewell of Hector and Andromache (engraving from the Iliad, 1711)

The narrative of the painting is based on the events of the Trojan War as described in the Iliad, an epic poem attributed to Homer. Hector, the Trojan commander-in-chief, is about to go to battle with the Achaean Greeks who are besieging Troy. At the Scaean Gate, through which he is about to leave the city, Hector meets his wife Andromache, who is holding their infant son Astyanax.

Foreseeing trouble, Andromache is persuading her husband not to risk his life: "stay here upon this wall; make not your child fatherless, and your wife a widow". But Hector's patriotic feelings take over. He believes that he is obliged to defend the Trojans and take part in the battle. Hector foresees the defeat of his army and the destruction of Troy, which will lead to slavery and the suffering of his loved ones, but he refuses Andromache's pleas: "Wife, I too have thought upon all this, but with what face should I look upon the Trojans, men or women, if I shirked battle like a coward?" Then Hector tried to embrace his son, but he recoiled from his father, "scared at the sight of his father's armor, and at the horse-hair plume that nodded fiercely from his helmet". Removing the helmet that frightened the child from his head, Hector took Astyanax and pleaded with the gods:

"Zeus," he cried, "grant that this my child may be even as myself, chief among the Trojans; let him be not less excellent in strength, and let him rule Ilion with his might. Then may one say of him as he comes from battle, 'The son is far better than the father.' May he bring back the blood-stained spoils of him whom he has laid low, and let his mother's heart be glad.'"

— Homer, Iliad 6.475

This is the moment of Hector's pitiful appeal to the gods that Losenko depicted in his painting. The artist combines the theme of the Trojan hero's farewell to his family with the theme of patriotic exploits and civic duty, with Hector's oath of loyalty to his people, expressed in his desire to "set the cup of our deliverance before ever-living gods of heaven in our own homes, when we have chased the Achaeans from Troy."

=== Characters and composition ===
The composition of the painting comprises several groups of people. The central group, which includes Hector, Andromache and Astyanax, as well as the maid standing to their left, is surrounded by two groups of "chorus", composed mainly of Trojan warriors. In addition, there is another group on the right in the background, which includes a horse-driver and an armed retinue.

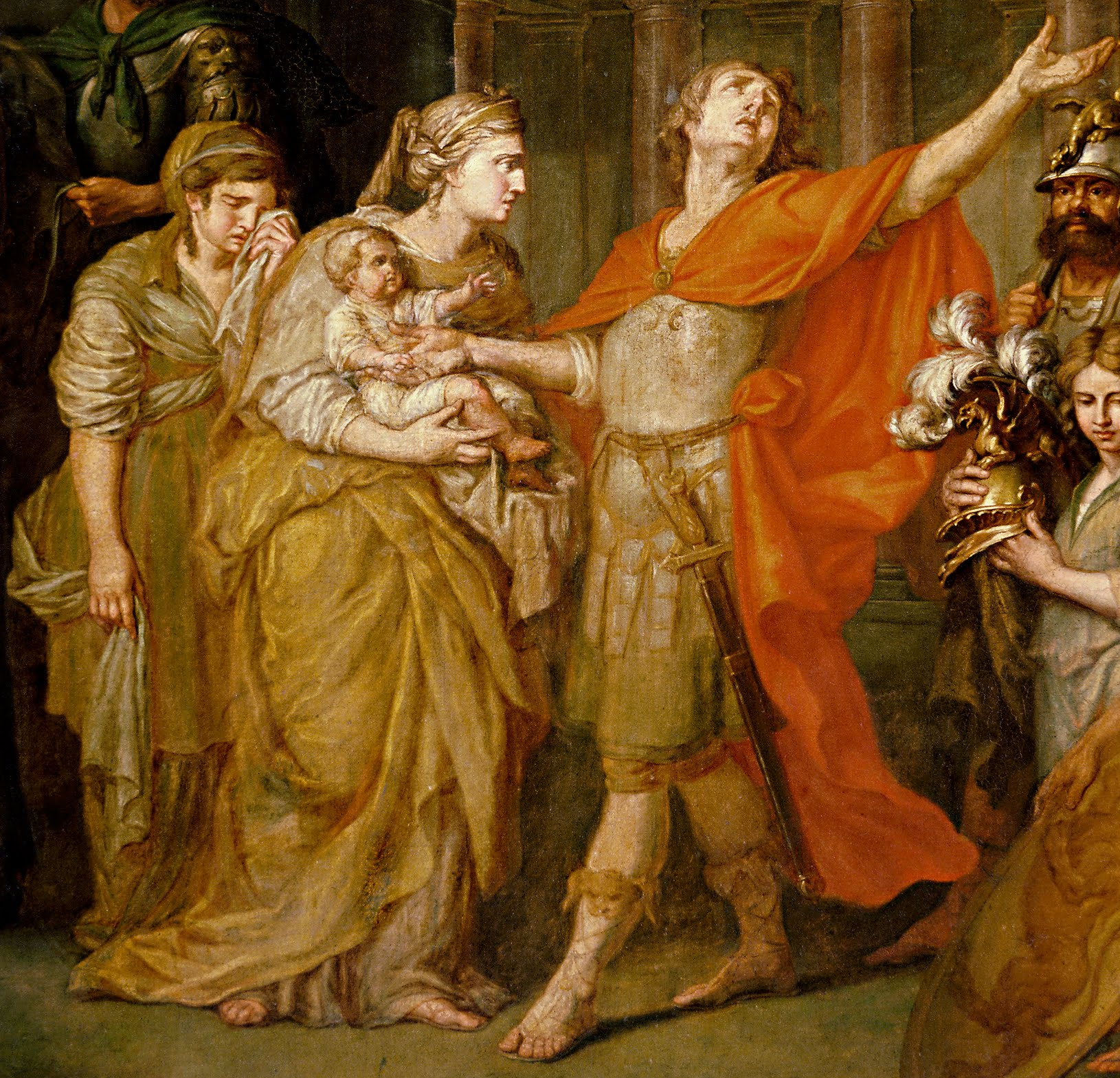
Central group

The compositional centre of the painting depicts Hector, a selfless folk hero. He is shown standing beside Andromache, with his right hand on the small hand of his son. As he recites the words of the oath, he extends his left hand out to the side, indicating that he is addressing all the Trojans. This serves to illustrate the artist's interpretation of the protagonist, which portrays him as both a loving father and a loyal citizen of Troy. The centrality of Hector in the composition of the painting is further emphasised by the fluttering of his red himation in the wind. His facial expression, upward gaze, and open mouth attest to the sincerity of both his vow and his overwhelming feelings. At the same time, according to art historian Avraham Kaganovich, "Hector's face and figure do not evoke an antique prototype, they are as real as the model that the artist undoubtedly used". Hector's clothes, including his cloak, are painted in the 18th-century pictorial tradition and more reminiscent of the Baroque than the Classical style, and his appearance has "much more real simplicity than epic grandeur". In general, the tradition of Russian classicism is evident in this work, which avoids excessive abstraction and introduces elements of concreteness into the portrayal of the characters, making them more understandable and closer to the audience. The main content of Losenko's image of Hector is that he is "full of strength, faith in the victory of a high patriotic impulse". Therefore, this image of the Trojan hero evokes in the audience not simply compassion, but a feeling of sincere respect.

The image of Andromache, also central to the composition of the painting, is, in Kaganovich's opinion, less successful than that of Hector, particularly because "he has been more influenced by abstract classics than anyone else". With a small son in her arms, she is turned to Hector and listens attentively to his words, but her attention is superficial, and in her appearance "she is perhaps the most alien character in the crowd of Losenkov's Trojans." This is likely due to the fact that the artist had not yet completed her image, particularly in the case of Andromache's face and eyes, which were merely "prepared for painting", and her clothes, which exhibited "an abundance of hinted and not yet revealed folds".

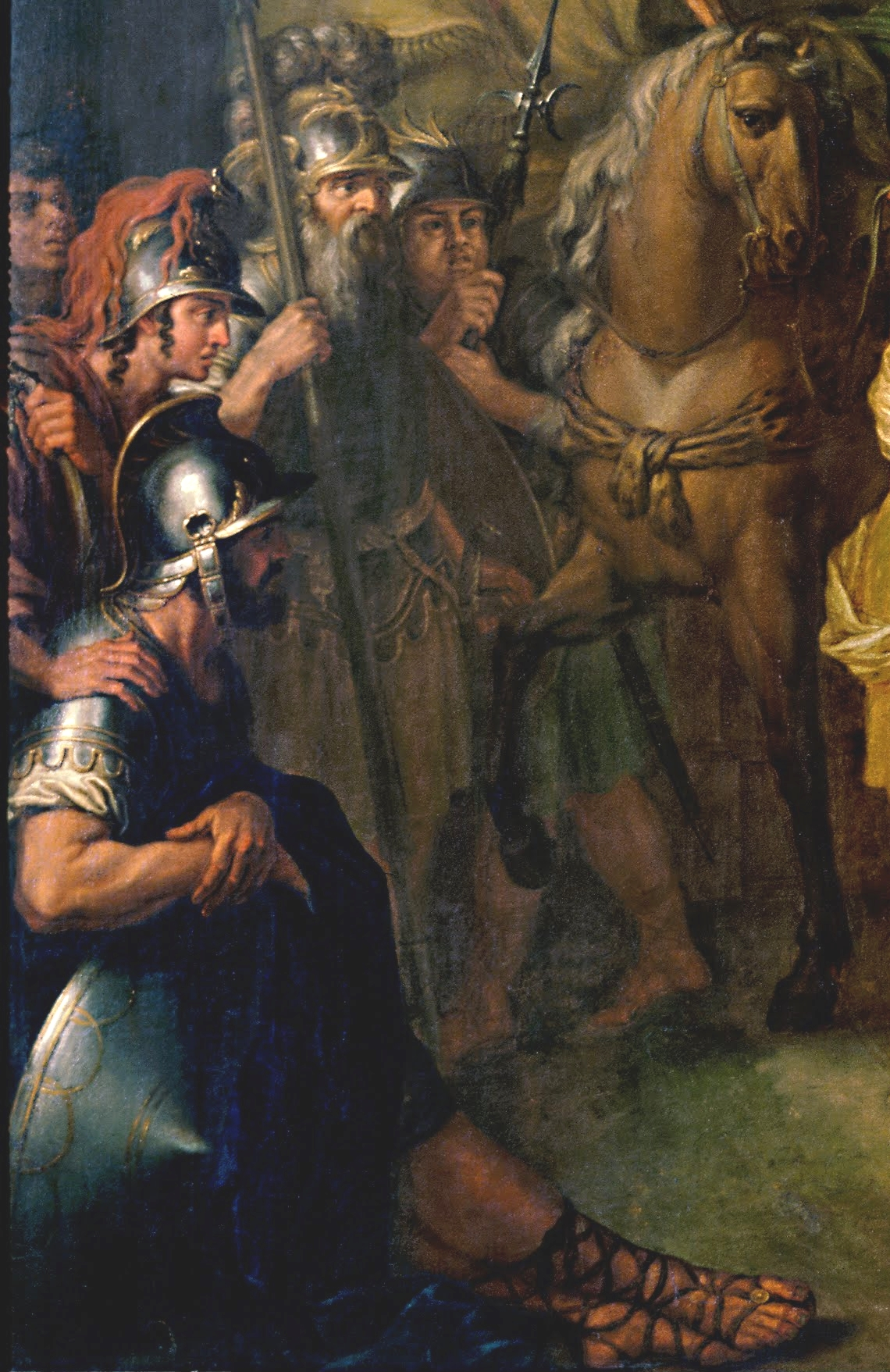
Left group

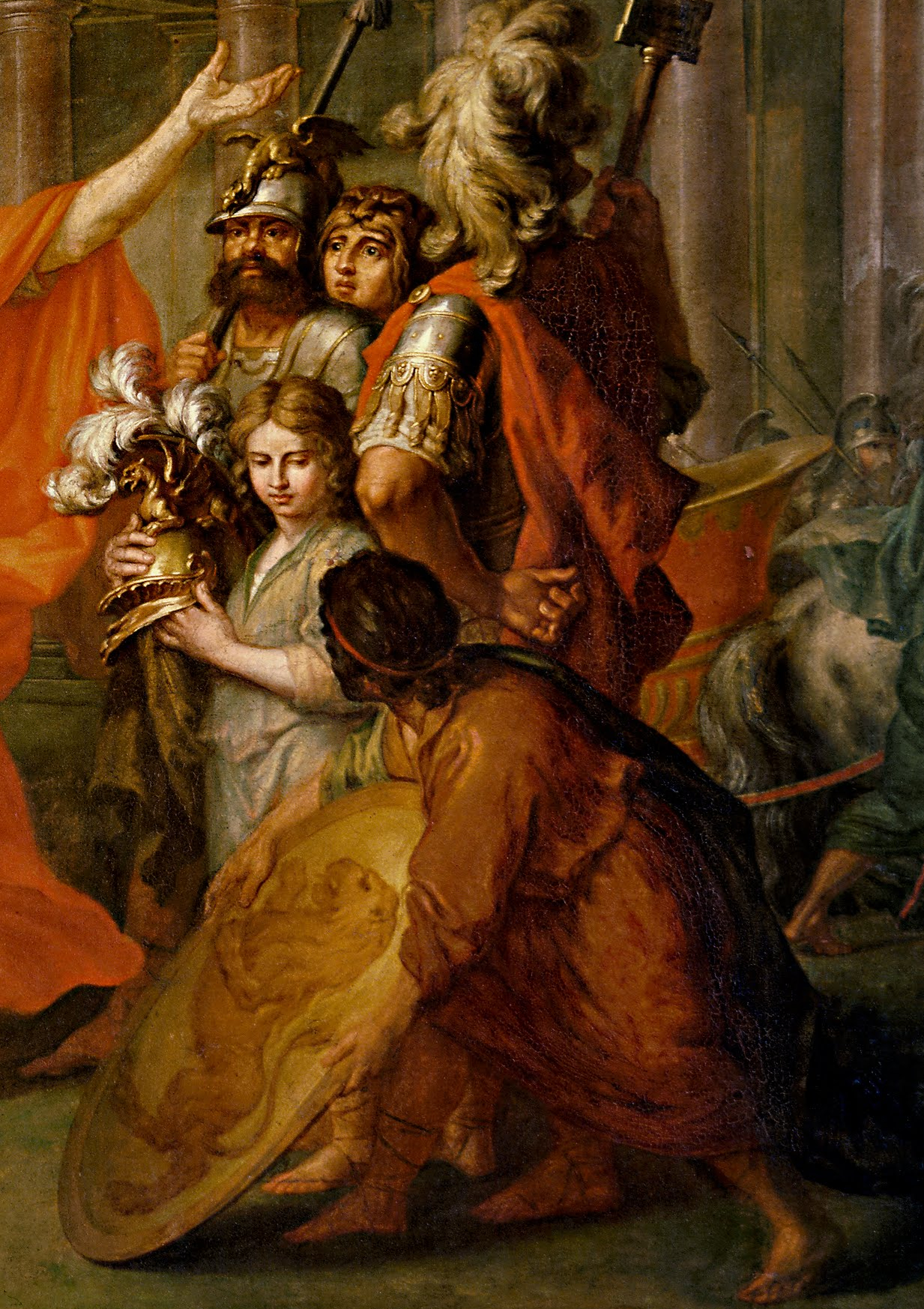
Right group

The image of the weeping maiden also belongs to the central group. The weeping maid is a character actor of the painting, and her image can be traced back to the earliest preparatory sketches by Losenko. The woman is depicted crying, wiping her tears with the end of her kerchief. Her costume is similar to that of an ordinary woman from the 18th century. It seems that the artist was drawn to this "image of a sensitive woman, touching in her kindness and sincerity of experience", which was seen as "a very real image of a simple person from the folk". According to the philologist Era Kuznetsova, "there is much more naturalness, directness and intimacy in her image than in the image of her lady". The lyrical and touching image of the maid anticipates the images of peasant women created in the early 19th century by Alexey Venetsianov. Concurrently, the maid appears to be an integral component of Andromache's image, closely and inextricably linked to it, inseparable from it.

The right group consists of five figures. They include a young man holding a shield, a boy or girl wearing Hector's helmet (the same one that frightened Astyanax), a tall warrior in armour with a sultan on his helmet who is turned away from the viewer, another warrior with a dark beard, and a young Trojan looking admiringly at Hector from behind. The image of the black-bearded warrior is considered one of the most successful in the painting, despite the fact that it is "infinitely far from the ancient ideal" and is rather perceived as a continuation of Losenko's work on peasant images, which were found in his earlier works.

Art historians also note the artist's considerable skill in portraying the warriors depicted on the left side of the painting, who are perceived as active participants in the composition. This also includes the figure of the rider with the banner situated behind the maid.

The architectural background plays a significant role in the composition of the canvas. Losenko sought to make the most of its possibilities and to utilise it as an active element and an important factor in the figurative expressiveness of the painting. In the 18th century, there was no historical record of the appearance of the buildings, walls, gates and defensive fortifications of Troy. Losenko painted his picture a hundred years before Heinrich Schliemann's archaeological expedition began excavations at the site of the original Troy in the 1870s. Thus, the primary source of information for the artist was the Iliad, which was replete with poetic exaggerations. In Losenko's painting, the architectural image of the ancient city is depicted in a grandiose manner - "a high wall with a number of Doric columns, huge, antique-style gates and fortress towers in the background create an impression of true grandeur".

== Sketches and studies ==
=== Sketches ===
The Russian Museum owns the graphic sketch Farewell of Hector and Andromache (grey paper, Italian pencil, 21.8 × 29.1 cm, inv. R-1206), which is one of the earliest variants of the composition of the future painting. Unlike the final version of the painting, in this drawing Hector is to the left of Andromache and the maid, with his right (rather than the left) arm outstretched.

The State Tretyakov Gallery owns a sketch of the painting Farewell of Hector and Andromache (oil on canvas, 48.3 × 63.5 cm, inv. Zh-1062). The Council of the Tretyakov Gallery acquired the sketch in 1917 from the Moscow collector N.S. Gavrilov (great-grandson of F.P. Makovsky). Abraham Kaganovich, noting the softness of the colour relationships and the integrity of the colouristic environment, wrote that "in Russian historical painting of the 18th century, this sketch retains a unique position as the most picturesque work".

Sketches for the painting Farewell of Hector and Andromache

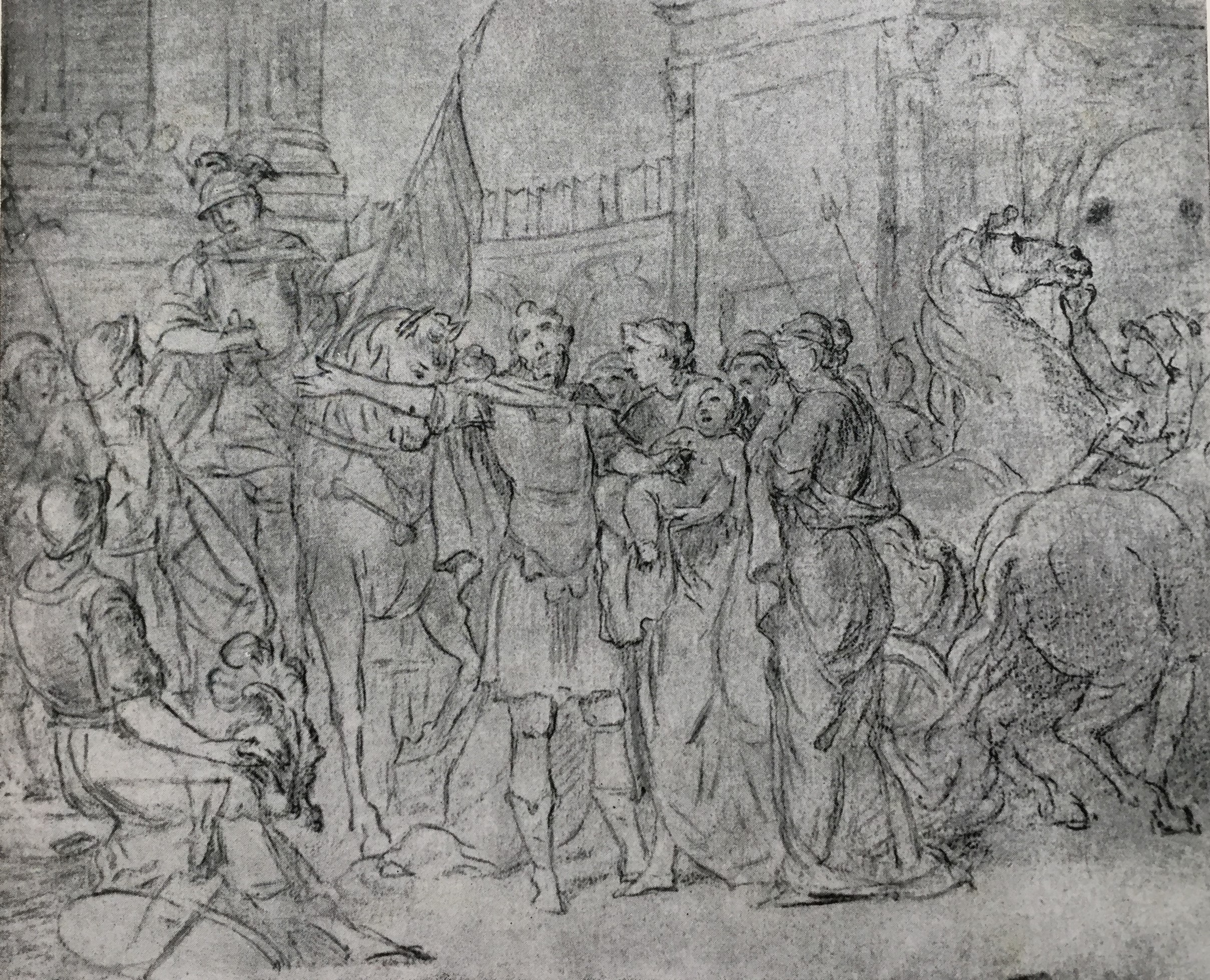
Graphic sketch (Russian Museum)

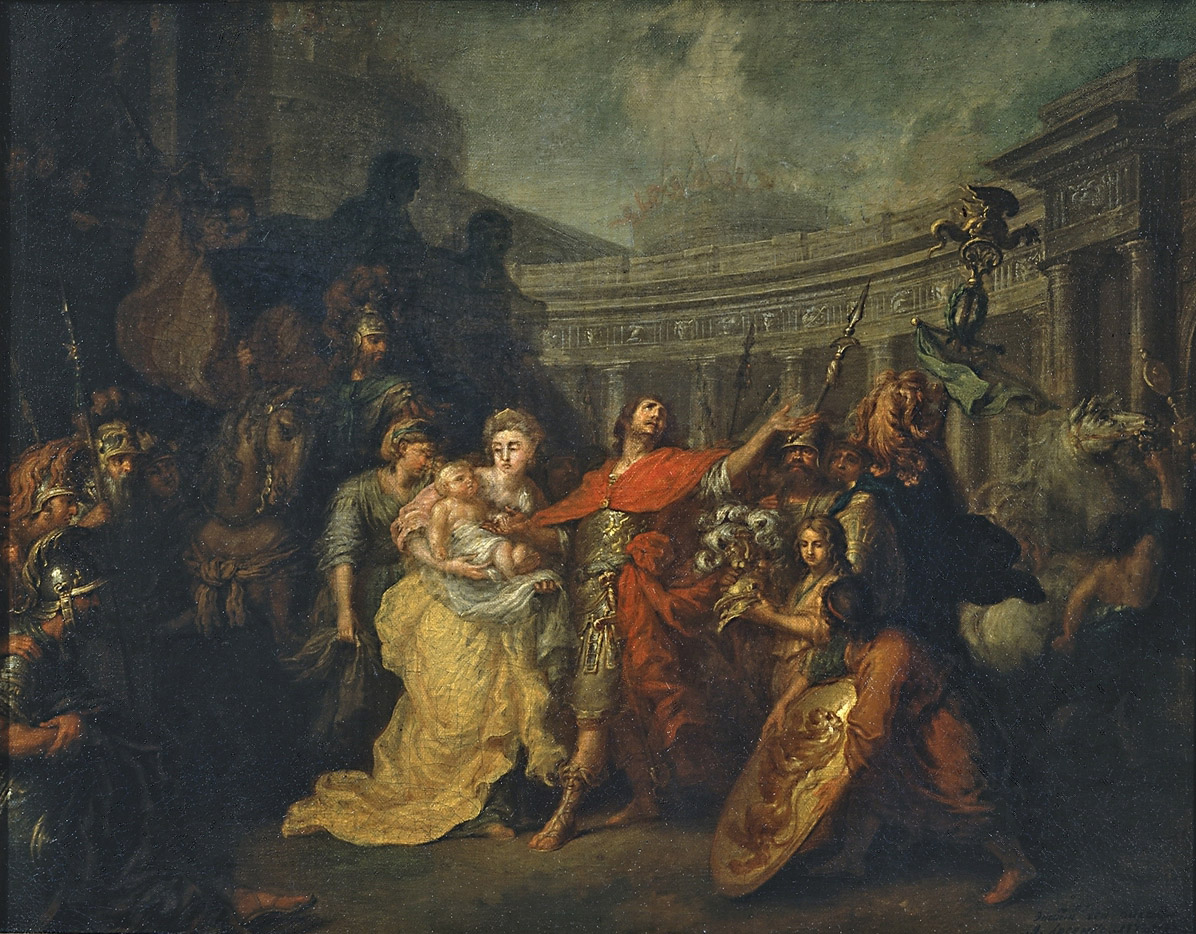
Pictorial sketch (Tretyakov Gallery)

=== Graphic studies ===
A number of graphic studies created by Losenko in preparation for the painting are held in the State Russian Museum. These include The crying maid (paper, graphite pencil, chalk, 27.2 × 11.6 cm, Inventory R-1208). R-1208), Three warriors with Hector's weapons (paper, graphite pencil, chalk, 23.9 × 16.0 cm, inv. R-1216), Arm (paper, pencil, 15.5 × 22.0 cm, inv. R-1200), Man's Head (paper, pencil, 13.6 × 10.3 cm, Inventory No. R-1202) and Arm (paper, pencil, chalk, 25.5 × 13.5 cm, Inventory No. R-13012). Avraham Kaganovich believes that the preparatory drawing for the crying maid was probably made from life - according to him, this study is "lively and expressive, faithfully representing the model". Kaganovich calls the sketch for the figures of three warriors, made for the actors of the right group, "a typical example of a sketch for a painting, in which the artist is primarily interested in the relationship of characters, their spatial position, the nature of the action".

Graphic studies for the painting Farewell of Hector and Andromache

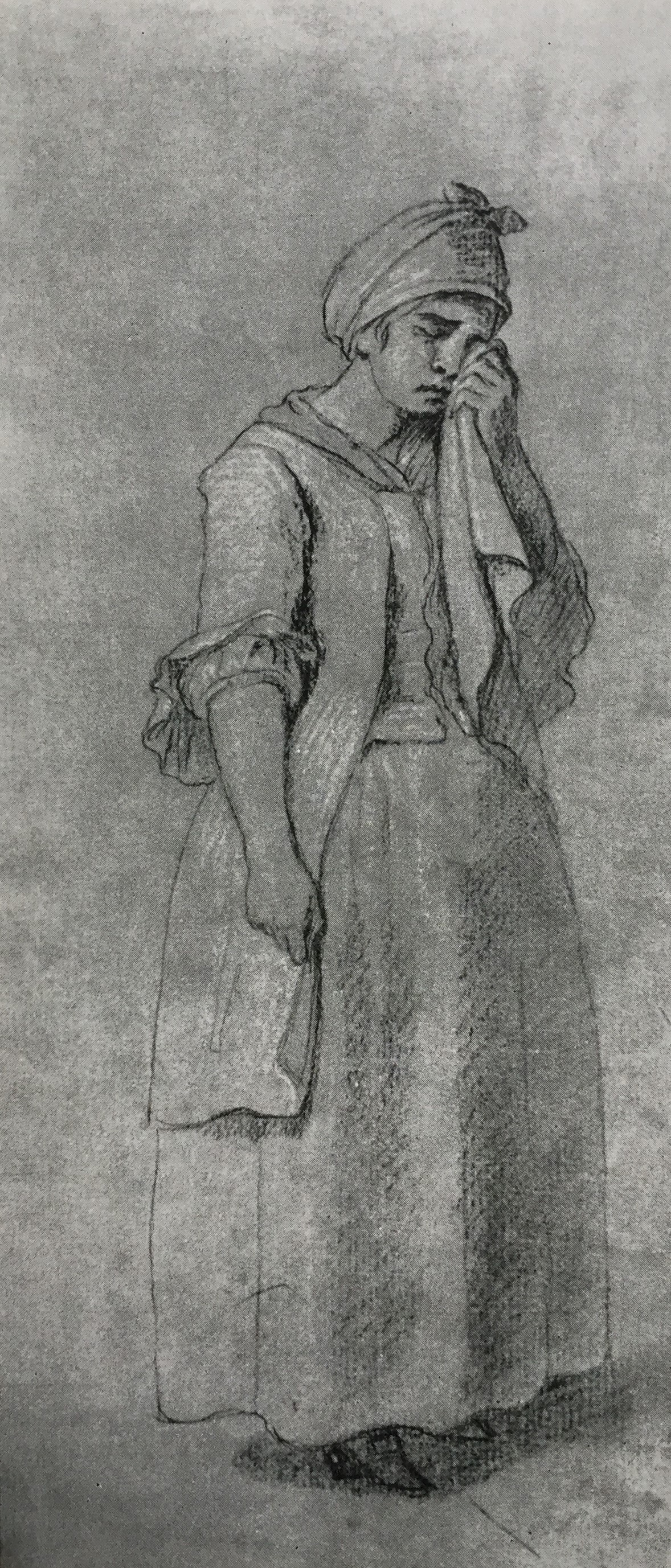
The crying maid

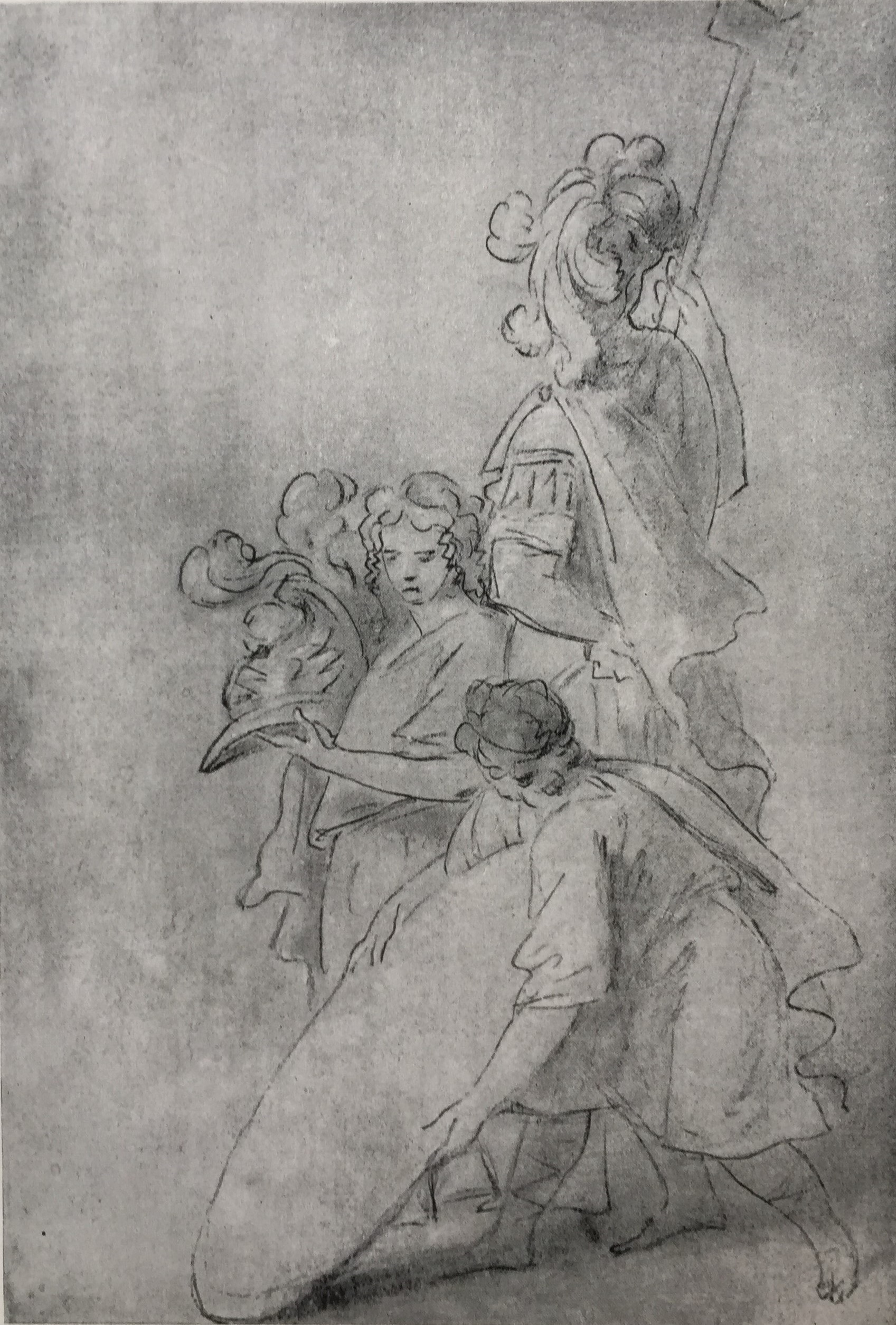
Three warriors with Hector's weapons

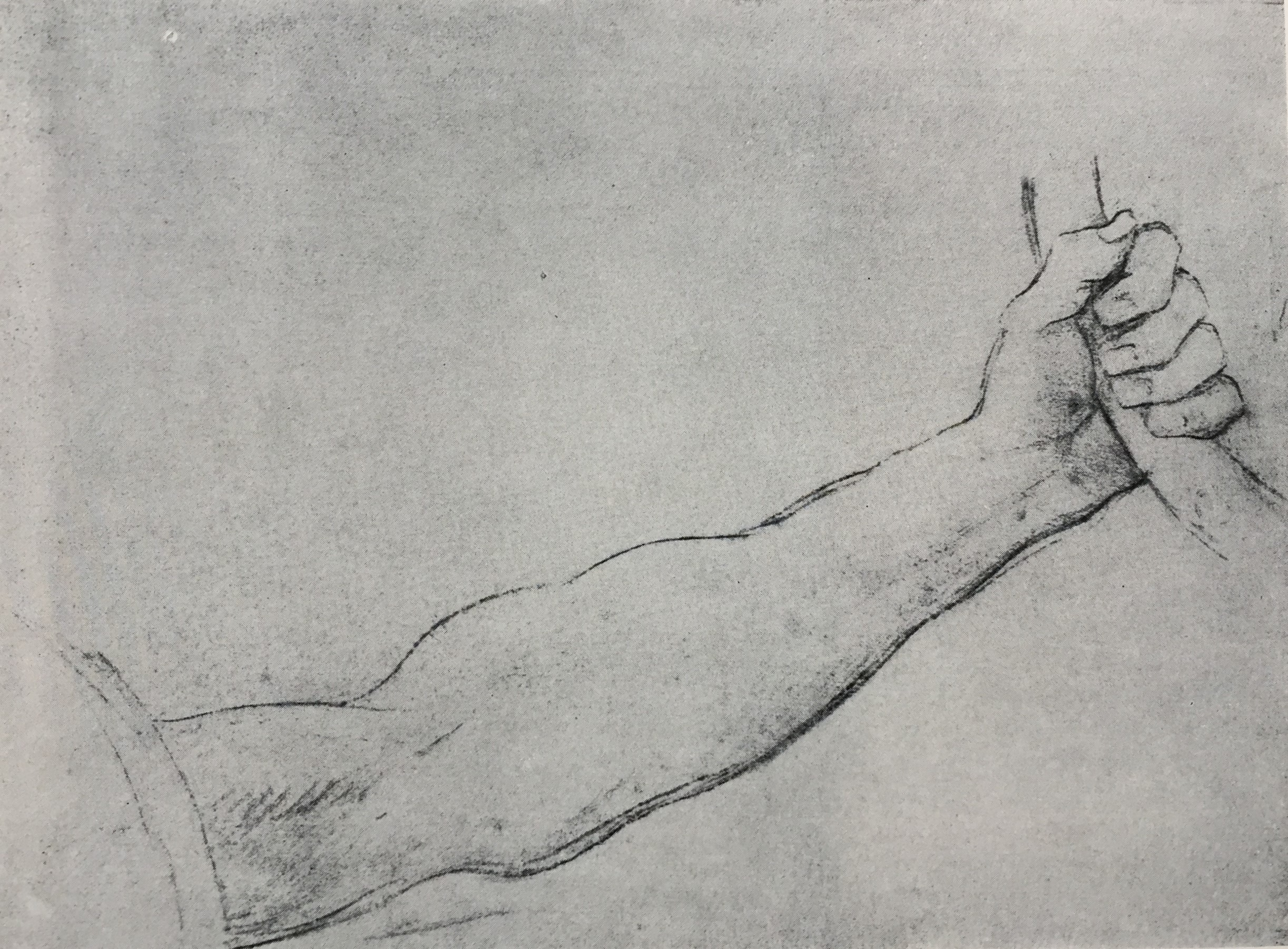
Arm

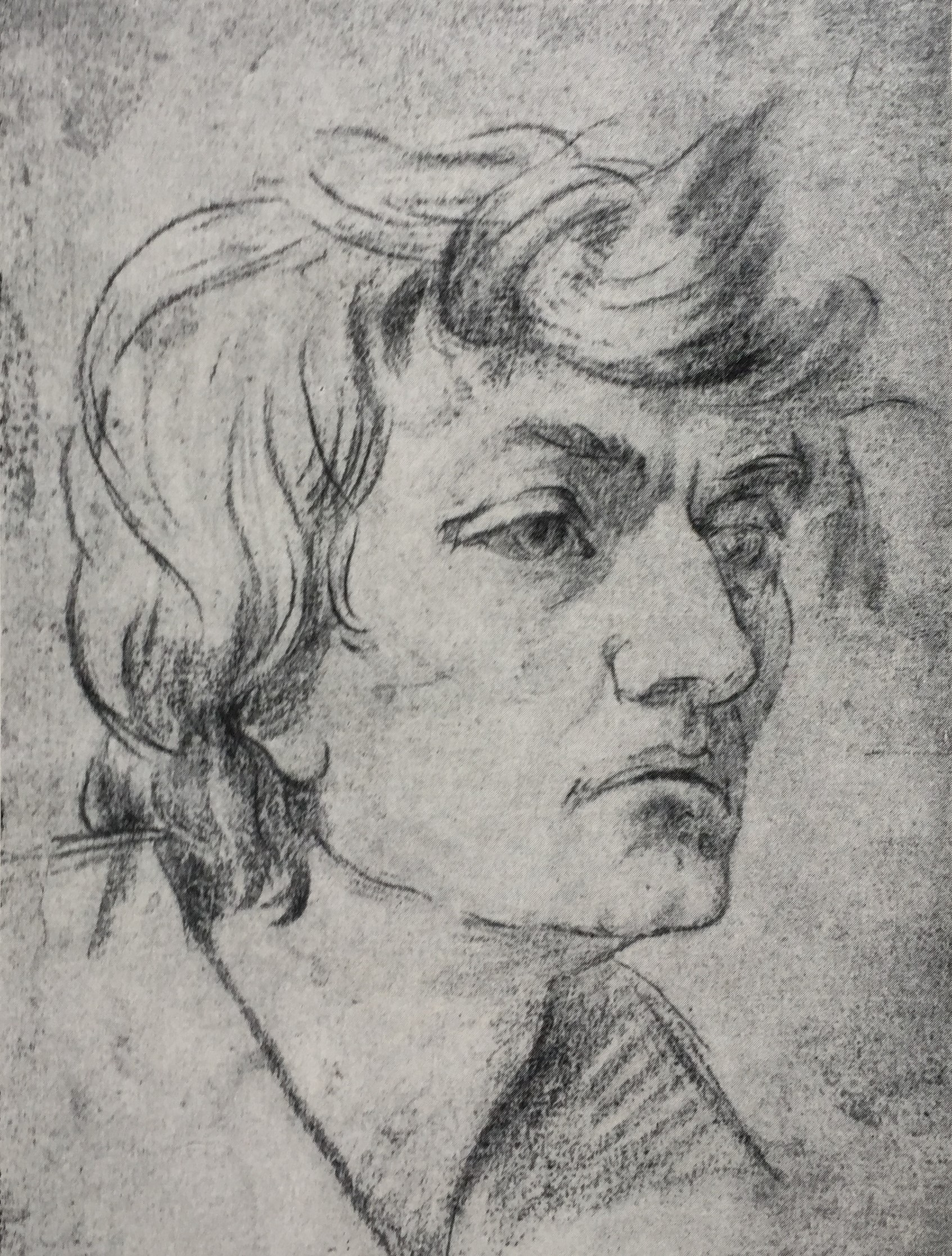
Man's head

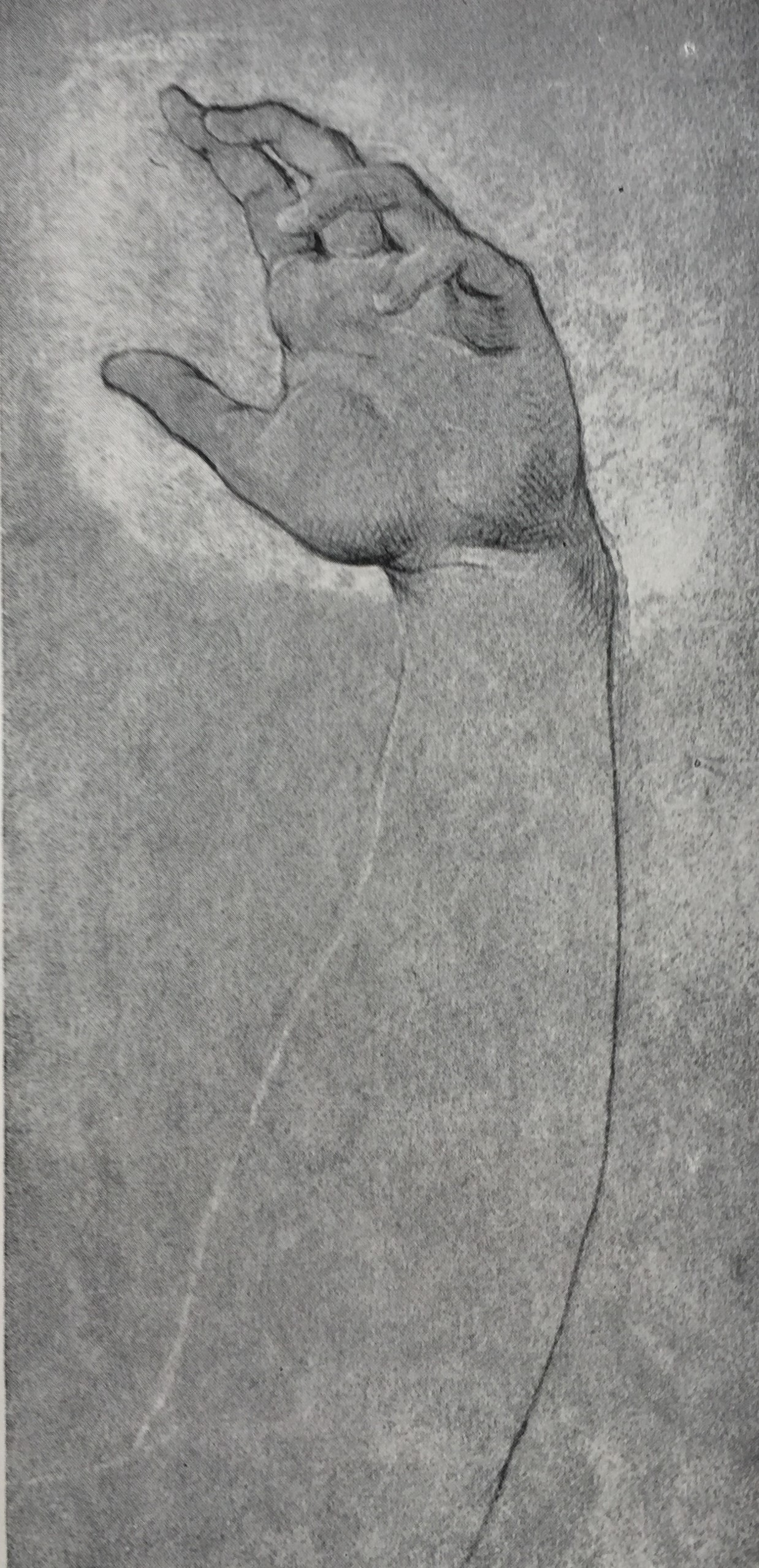
Arm

The State Tretyakov Gallery houses a study entitled Young man presenting a shield. Arm bent at the elbow (early 1770s, grey primed paper, Italian pencil, chalk, 28.7 × 22.4 cm, Inventory No. 26513, album, folio 18, pasted on the album sheet) and The head of a crying woman (early 1770s, blue primed paper, lead pencil, 14.7 × 12.5 cm, Inventory No. R-1347). The first of these had been held in the St. Petersburg collection of A. R. Tomilov and was subsequently transferred to the Moscow collection of A. F. Zakharov. It was acquired by the Gallery in 1944 from Zakharov. This study, which depicts a young warrior bent over with a shield, is "characterised by great skill of execution, faithfulness of proportions and complete clarity of the model's character." It effectively conveys the movement of the young man, as well as the position of his torso and head. The drawing, entitled The head of a crying woman (also known as The head of a crying maid), was previously in the collection of A. F. Korostin, and subsequently in the collection of A. F. Korostin. The painting was subsequently acquired by the gallery in 1971 from F. Korostin and I. A. Korostina, who had acquired it from the artist in 1968. In the same year, the painting was restored by E. N. Divova. This study, which is regarded as "one of the earliest and most expressive images of a Russian peasant woman created in the 18th century," provides evidence of a meticulous search for the image of a maid.

Three graphic studies are kept at the Museum of the Russian Academy of Arts in St. Petersburg. These include Man with a stick (paper, pencil, 29.1 × 22.2 cm, Inventory No. 1874), Two warriors (paper, pencil, 39.5 × 28.0 cm, Inventory No. 1876) and Warrior in a helmet (paper, pencil, 27.5 × 24.0 cm, Inventory No. 1875). The collection of the Pushkin State Museum of Fine Arts includes the study Child (grey primed paper, pencil, 21.1 × 13.5 cm, Inventory GR-850, from the collection of I. S. Silberstein), which depicts a half-lying nude child. The artist employed this drawing as the basis for the image of Astyanax.

Graphic studies for the painting Farewell of Hector and Andromache

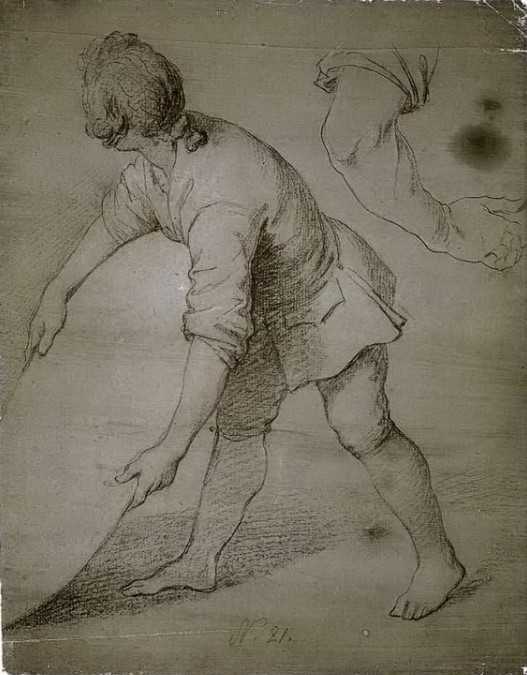
Young man presenting a shield. Arm bent at the elbow

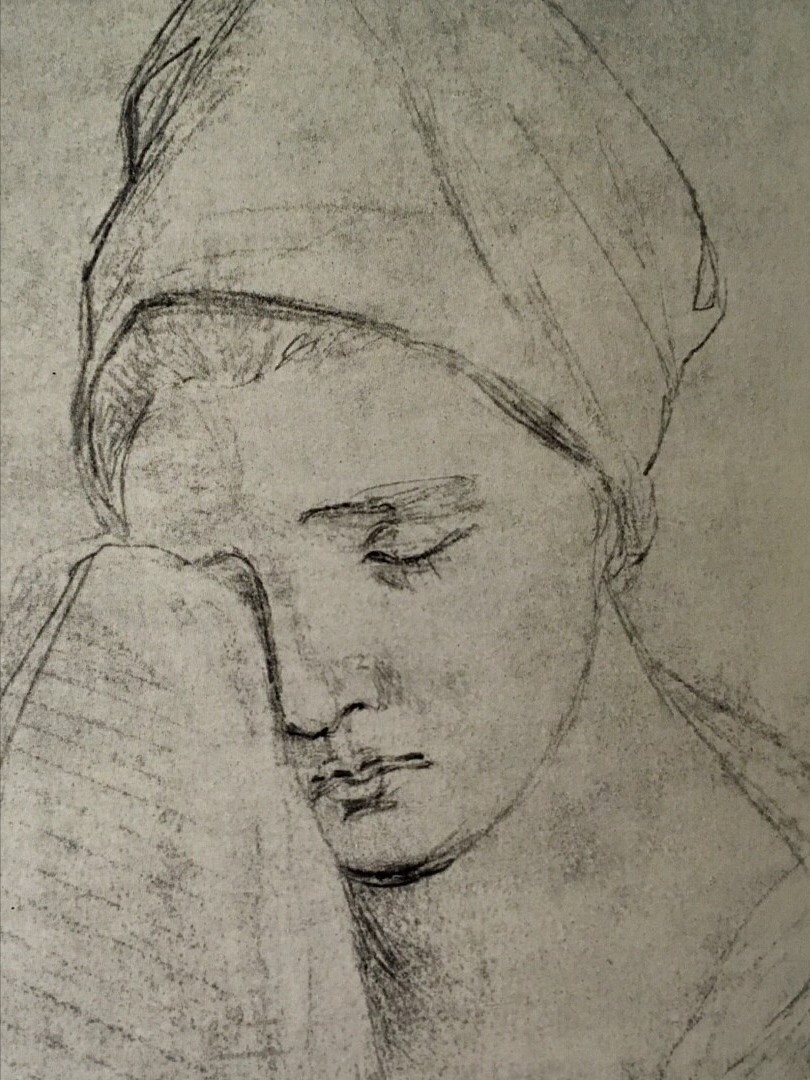
The head of a crying woman

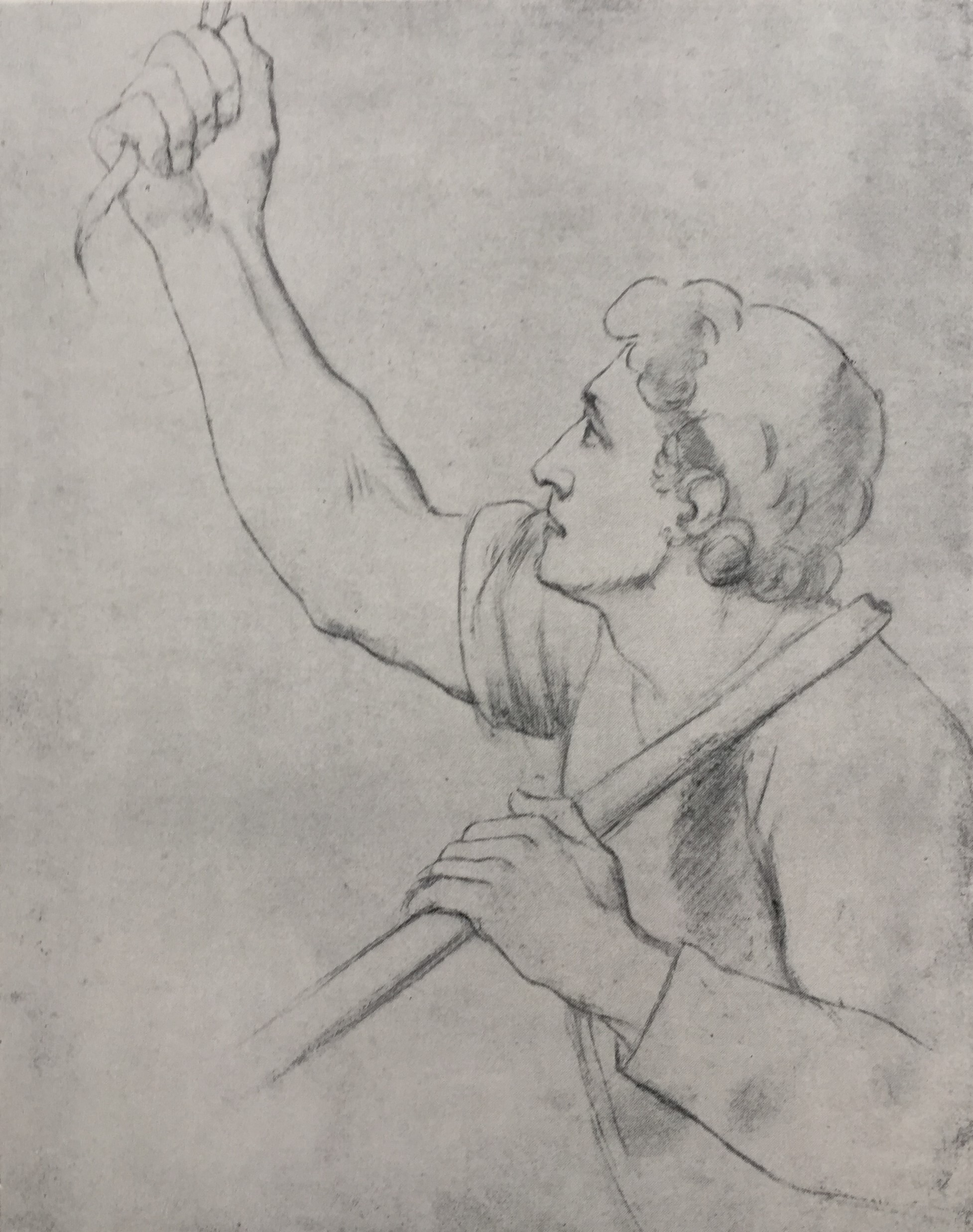
Man with a stick

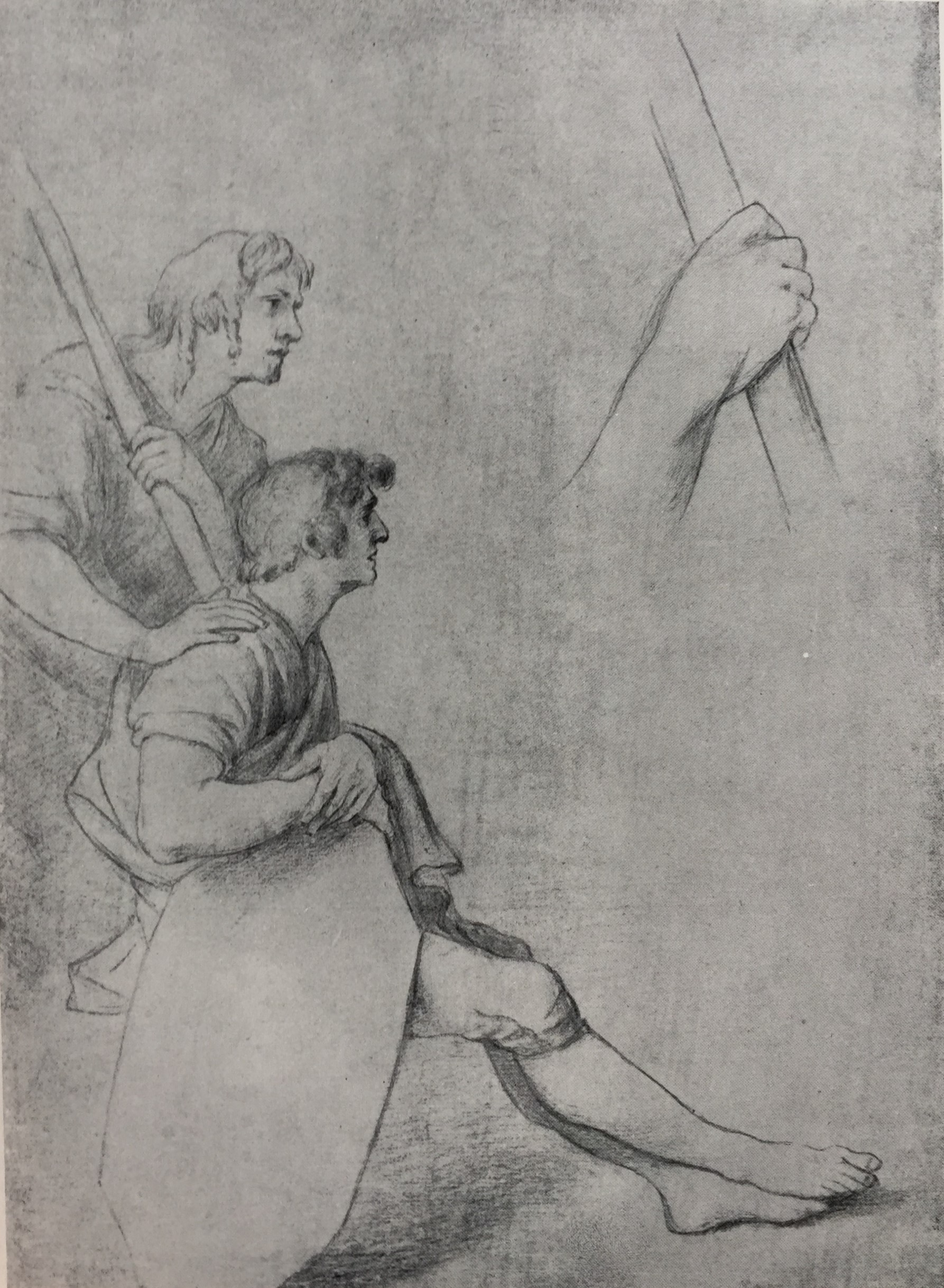
Two warriors

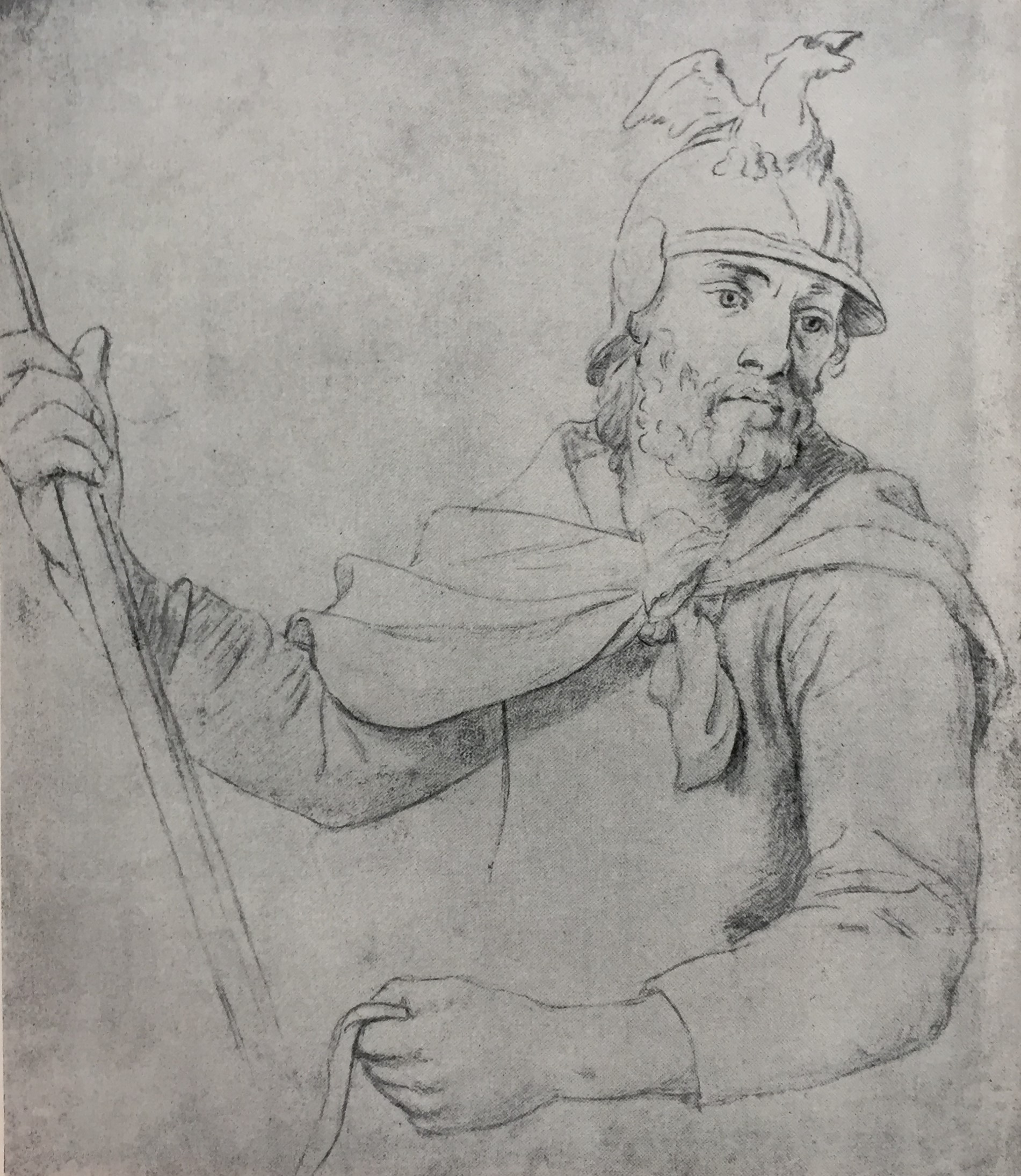
Warrior in a helmet

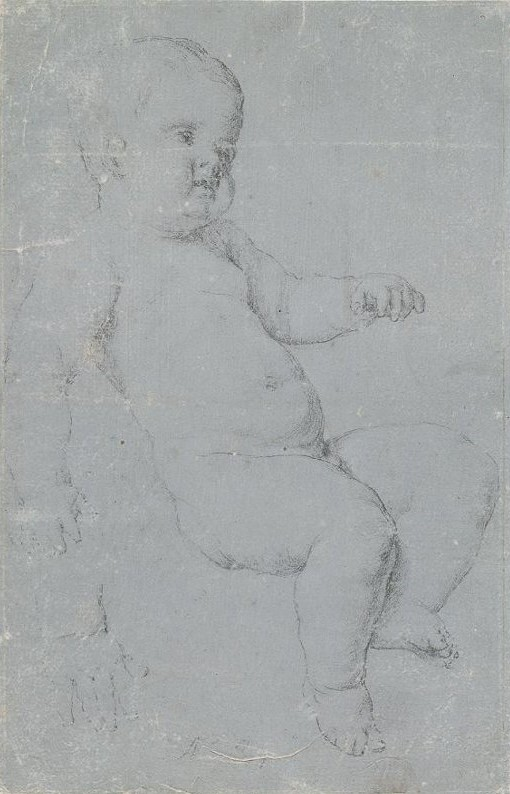
Child

== Reviews ==
In one of the letters written in the early 1790s, the writer and educator Mikhail Muravyov recalled: "With what pleasure we were saturated with the sight of Losenkov's paintings. In his farewells Hector and Andromache we recognised Homer. Chelo hero frank, hands, stretched to accept the baby, the courage of the parent, pleasantly opposed to the tenderness and fears of the mother. Seeing only features, we guessed their feelings and heard, it seems, conversations".

In a review of Losenko's work published in 1914, the art historian Sergei Ernst wrote that the events depicted in Hector's Farewell unfold against a backdrop of monumental architecture, "under a cloudy, restless sky". According to Ernst, "the whole action is free and slender, though somewhat cold and parade-like", while "there is some note of true pathos, true scope in the general idea". Ernst also noted the pleasantness of the painting's colouring, which includes "tired harmonies" of pale green, red and grey. Not hiding his negative attitude to academic painting, Ernst wrote that perhaps it was because of its unfinished nature that the painting lacked the flavour of coldness and deadness "so common in Losenko's academic compositions".

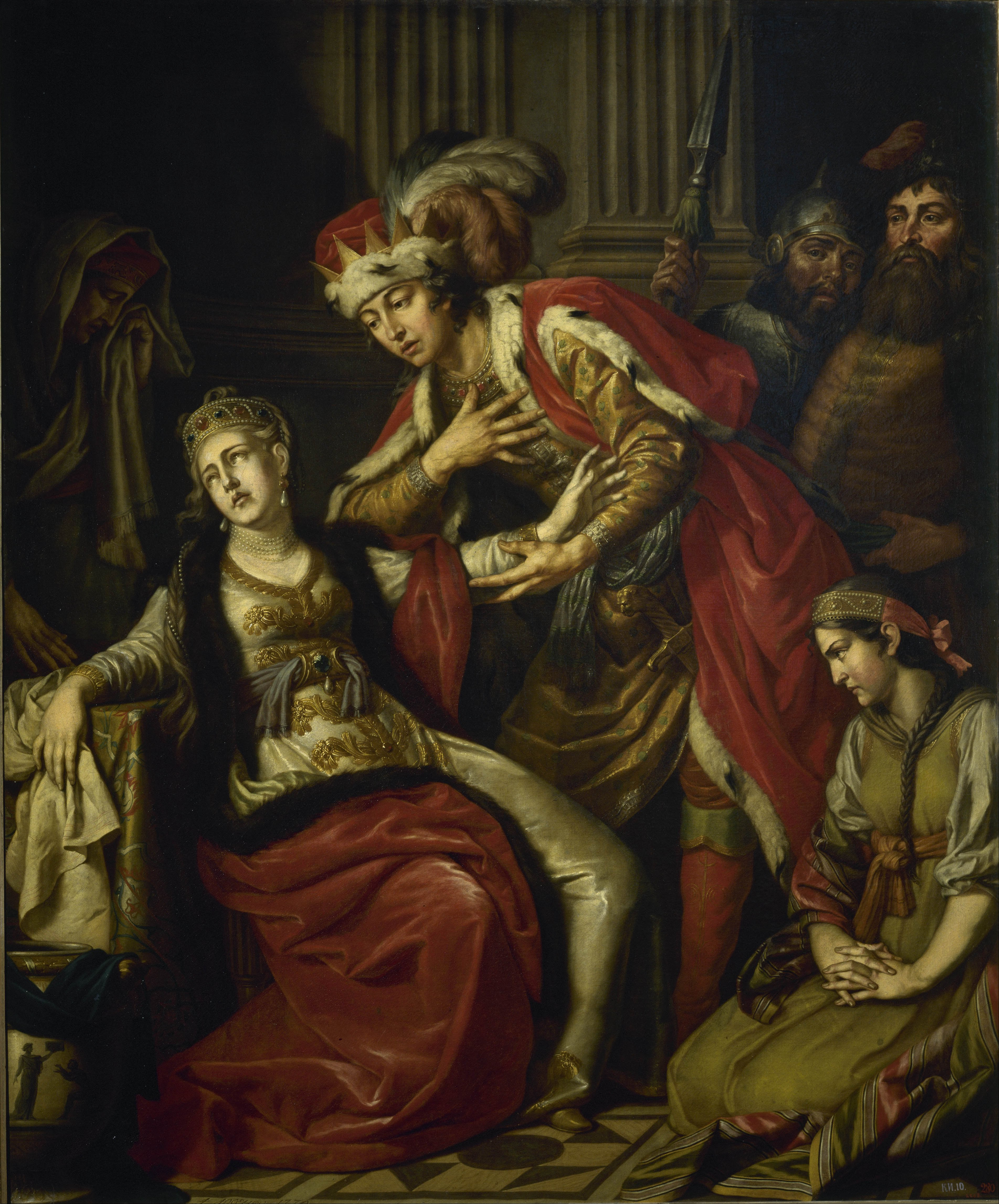
Anton Losenko. Vladimir and Rogneda (1770, State Russian Museum)

Art historian Alexei Savinov noted that, as in his earlier painting Vladimir and Rogneda (1770, State Russian Museum), in Farewell of Hector and Andromache Losenko "combined the great and the simple, theatrical elevation and vital naturalness", using a variety of artistic methods in search of greater expressiveness of content. The elements of Losenko's original style, according to Savinov, include "strict, clear composition, spatiality of construction, strong contrasts of colour and shadow, painterliness of the painting as a whole, severity next to emotional elevation, figures in sharp movement or motionless".

According to the art historian Vsevolod Petrov, Anton Losenko's paintings Vladimir and Rogneda and Farewell of Hector and Andromache are at the origin of "a persistent and continuous tradition of the 'historical genre'", which took root in the system of academic art and for a long time determined the direction of development of Russian historical painting. At the same time, according to Petrov, it is in the painting Farewell of Hector and Andromache that "with the greatest clarity formed those artistic principles that later formed the basis of all historical painting in the Academy of Arts of the 18th - the first third of the 19th century".

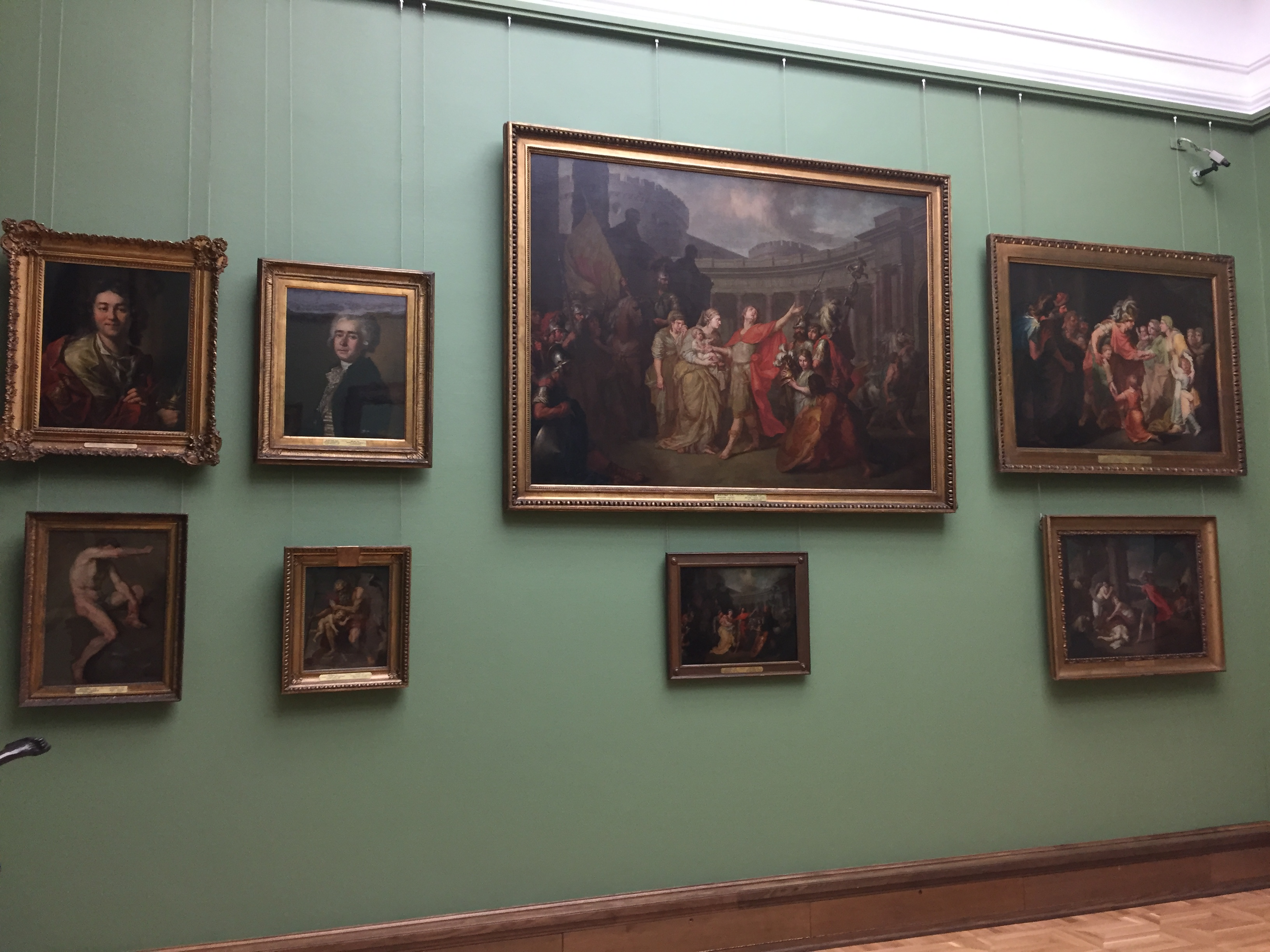
The painting Farewell of Hector and Andromache, a sketch for it, as well as other works by Losenko in the State Tretyakov Gallery

Art historian Avraham Kaganovich called the canvas Farewell of Hector and Andromache a mature work, fully demonstrating "the artist's high professional abilities as a composer, draughtsman and painter", as well as "his method of painting and views on the regularities of the construction of historical paintings". After Losenko's death, these features of painting construction were adopted by his students and "developed into an unwritten system of compositional thought that influenced the subsequent history of Russian historical painting".

Art historian Alla Vereshchagina cited Losenkov's painting Farewell of Hector and Andromache as an example of how, as classicism developed in Russian painting, "antique themes were more and more actively inserted into its subject circle". According to Vereshchagina, unlike the earlier painting Vladimir and Rogneda, where "the emphasis was placed on revealing the lyrical properties of the hero's soul", in Farewell of Hector and Andromache the artist "showed the civil virtues of man". Noting the beauty of the colouring of both the sketch and the main canvas, Vereshchagina wrote that "from a purely pictorial point of view, these things are more interesting than all the earlier works by Losenko".

According to art historian Nonna Yakovleva, the painting Farewell of Hector and Andromache can still serve as "an ideal textbook illustrating the compositional, colouristic and ideological principles of classicism". Comparing Losenko's latest work with his earlier works, Yakovleva wrote that in it one can note "external pathos and internal coldness". However, according to Yakovleva, the classicist theatre productions of the time were also characterised by pathos, so that "it did not 'offend the eye' of anyone" - for this reason the painting can be called "exemplarily classicist".

== Bibliography ==
- Верещагина, А.Г. (1973). Художник. Время. История. Очерки русской исторической живописи XVIII — начала XX века [Painter. Time. History. Sketches of Russian historical painting of the 18th - early 20th century] (in Russian). Leningrad: Iskusstvo.
- Гаврилова, Е.И. (1977). Антон Павлович Лосенко [Anton Pavlovich Losenko] (in Russian). Leningrad: Artist of the RSFSR.
- Жидков, Г.В. (1926). "К вопросу о природе раннего русского академического классицизма" [On the nature of early Russian academic classicism]. Труды отделения искусствознания (in Russian). Moscow: Институт археологии и искусствознания: 51–60.
- Каганович, А.Л. (1963). Антон Лосенко и русское искусство середины XVIII столетия [Anton Losenko and Russian art of the mid-18th century] (in Russian). Moscow: Издательство Академии художеств СССР.
- Карев, А.А. (2003). Классицизм в русской живописи [Classicism in Russian painting]. Энциклопедия мирового искусства (in Russian). Moscow: Bely Gorod. ISBN 5-7793-0688-5.
- Коростин, А.Ф. (1952). Русский рисунок XVIII века [Russian drawing of the 18th century]. Русская графика (in Russian). Moscow: State Tretyakov Gallery.
- Кузнецова, Э.В. (1972). Беседы о русском искусстве XVIII — начала XIX века [Conversations about Russian art of the 18th - early 19th centuries] (in Russian). Moscow: Prosveshcheniye.
- Maykov, Vasily (1966). Избранные произведения [Selected Works]. Библиотека поэта (in Russian). А. В. Западов. Moscow - Leningrad: Sovetsky Pisatel.
- Muravyov, M.N. (1815). Обитатель предместия. Эмилиевы письма [A resident of the suburbs. The Emilie Letters] (in Russian). Saint Petersburg: Императорская Академия наук.
- Петров, В.Н. (1961). "А. П. Лосенко. «Прощание Гектора с Андромахой»" [A. P. Losenko. "Farewell of Hector and Andromache"]. Замечательные полотна [Wonderful canvases] (in Russian). Leningrad: Artist of the RSFSR. pp. 42–47.
- Петинова, Е.Ф. (2001). Русские художники XVIII — начала XX века [Russian artists of the 18th - early 20th century] (in Russian). Saint Petersburg: Aurora. ISBN 978-5-7300-0714-7.
- Петинова, Е.Ф. (2008). "Лосенко Антон Павлович" [Losenko Anton Pavlovich]. Русские живописцы XVIII—XIX века. Биографический словарь [Russian painters of the 18th-19th centuries. Biographical dictionary] (in Russian). Saint Petersburg: Азбука-Классика. pp. 382–386. ISBN 978-5-91181-923-1.
- Савинов, А.Н. (1948). Антон Павлович Лосенко [Anton Pavlovich Losenko]. Массовая библиотека «Искусство» (in Russian). Moscow: Iskusstvo.
- Савинов, А.Н. (1961). "Историческая живопись" [Historical painting]. История русского искусства [History of Russian Art] (in Russian). Vol. 7. Igor Grabar, Vladimir Kemenov, Viktor Lazarev. Moscow: Nauka. pp. 162–192.
- Эрнст, С.Р. (1914). "А. П. Лосенко" [A. P. Losenko]. Старые годы (in Russian) (1): 1–24.
- Яковлева, Н.А. (2005). Историческая картина в русской живописи [Historical painting in Russian painting]. Энциклопедия мирового искусства (in Russian). Moscow: Bely Gorod. ISBN 5-7793-0898-5.
- Государственная Третьяковская галерея — каталог собрания [State Tretyakov Gallery - catalogue of the collection] (in Russian). Vol. 2: Живопись XVIII века. Я. В. Брук, Л. И. Иовлева. Moscow. 2015. ISBN 978-5-89580-070-6.
- Государственная Третьяковская галерея — каталог собрания [State Tretyakov Gallery - catalogue of the collection] (in Russian). Vol. 1: Рисунок XVIII века. Moscow. 1996. ISBN 5-900743-21-7.
- Императорская Академия художеств. Музей. Русская живопись [The Imperial Academy of Arts. Museum. Russian painting] (in Russian). С. К. Исаков. Petrograd: Унион. 1915.
