= Pierre-Charles Le Mettay =

French painter

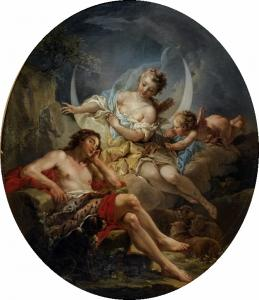
Selene and Endymion

Pierre-Charles Le Mettay (19 July 1726, Fécamp, Province of Normandy - 29 March 1759, Paris) was a French painter, primarily of mythological scenes, and designer. His last name has several spelling variations and his first name is sometimes given as Pierre-Joseph.

== Biography ==
He was the son of a goldsmith. His mother died five days after his baptism. When he came of age, he was apprenticed to an engineer in Sercus, but soon realized that he was not learning the skills that matched his aspirations. Aged barely sixteen, he managed to find a position in the studios of François Boucher. Within five years, he was ready to compete with other artists at the Académie royale de peinture et de sculpture and was awarded the Prix de Rome for painting in 1747.

When he arrived at the French Academy in Rome, he spent much of his time doing religious painting rather than following the school's curriculum. In 1751, nevertheless, the new Director, Charles-Joseph Natoire, chose him as one of four students who would do paintings for the General Directorate of Naples, despite opposition from the Marquis de Marigny who felt that Mettay had no talent and had ignored his studies too much. He went to Naples in 1753, followed by a trip through the main Adriatic ports. He remained in Turin long enough to be presented at court and receive several commissions. In 1756, he returned to Paris.

With some assistance from Boucher, he created paintings from sketches of Greece, made by the architect Julien-David Le Roy on his recent visit there, then did the same for a set of engravings by Jacques-Philippe Le Bas, which were issued in two folios. On the basis of this work, he presented himself for membership in the royal academy and was accepted as a candidate in 1757. Shortly after, he began to exhibit at the Salon and received great praise from the Mercure de France.

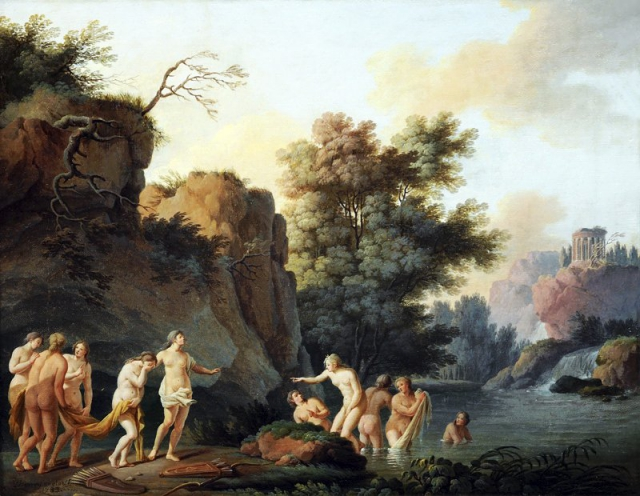
Venus Bathing

He became a full member of the academy in 1759, but died only twenty-six days later. His health had always been fragile and he may have succumbed to overwork.

Many of his works were widely distributed after being made into engravings by Jean-Charles Le Vasseur, Louis-Simon Lempereur and Adrian Zingg. Most of the drawings he made in Italy were sold to the Ribards; a well known merchant family in Rouen. Some eventually found their way into the possession of Jean-Baptiste Descamps, the founder of the "École de dessin de Rouen".
