= Vasily Maykov =

Russian poet (1728–1778)

- Василий Майков
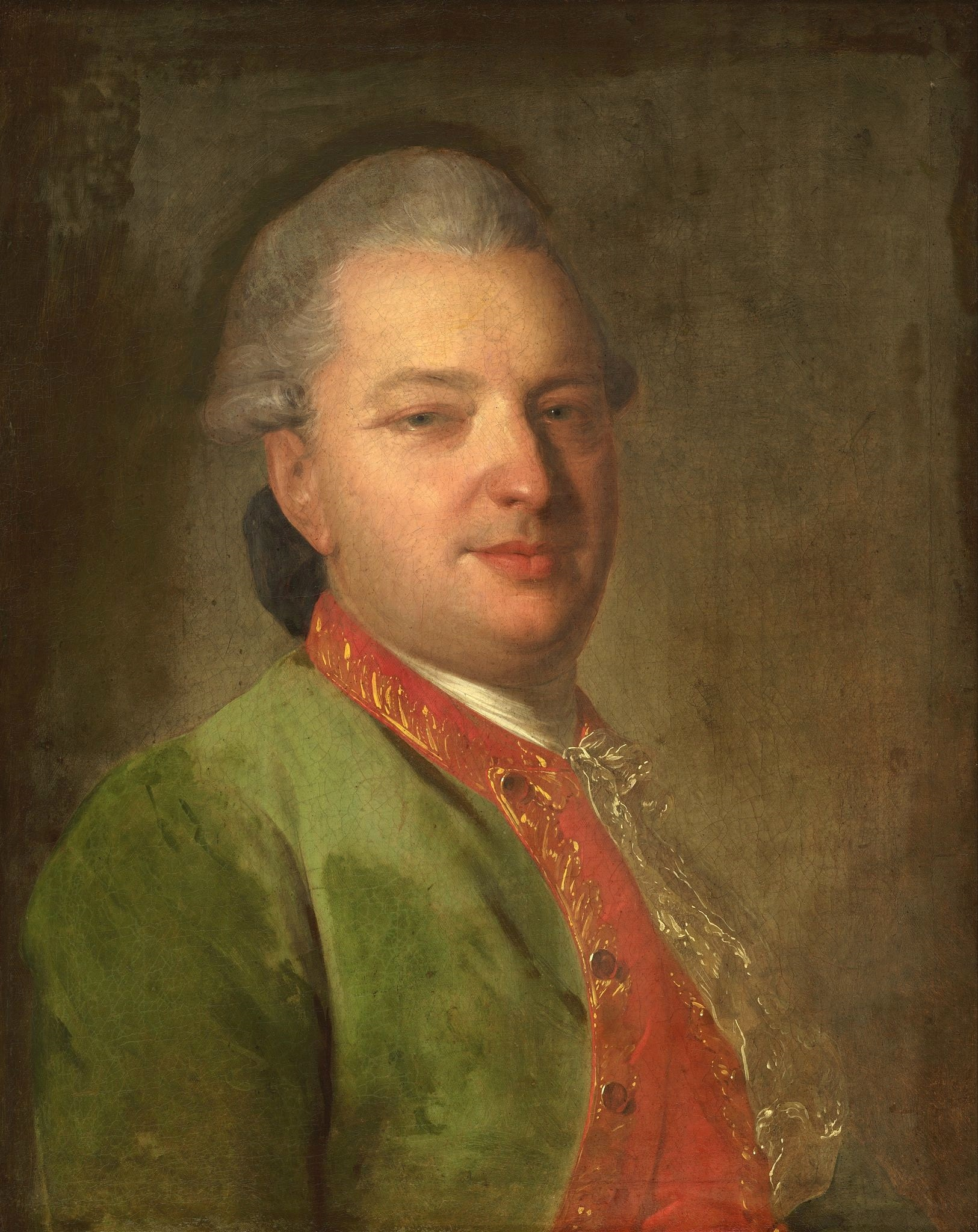
- Portrait by Fyodor Rokotov, 1775
- Born: 1728; Yaroslavl, Russian Empire
- Died: 26 June 1778 (aged 49–50); Moscow, Russian Empire
- Occupations: Poet, playwright, fabulist

Vasily Ivanovich Maykov (Russian: Василий Иванович Майков; 1728 – 28 June 1778) was a Russian poet, fabulist, playwright and translator. He was an exponent of the mock-heroic poetry genre in Russia.

As a playwright, Maykov followed the tradition set by Alexander Sumarokov but, alongside heroic tragedies (Agriope, Агриопа, 1775), wrote some comedies too (The Country Holiday or a Rewarded Virtue, Деревенский праздник, или Увенчанная добродетель, 1777), occasionally mixing the two genres. As a lyrical poet, he is said to have provided a link between the two eras in Russian poetry, that of Mikhail Lomonosov on the one hand and Gavriil Derzhavin, on another. What Maykov really excelled at, though, was ironic verse, and it was the comedy The Ombre Player (Игрок ломбера) that made him famous in 1763.

The Works by Maykov were first compiled in 1809, to be revised and re-issued by Pyotr Yefremov in 1867. In the Soviet Union, The Selected Works by V. I. Maykov were published in 1966 by Sovetsky Pisatel.
