= Mikhail Nikitich Muravyov =

Russian poet and writer

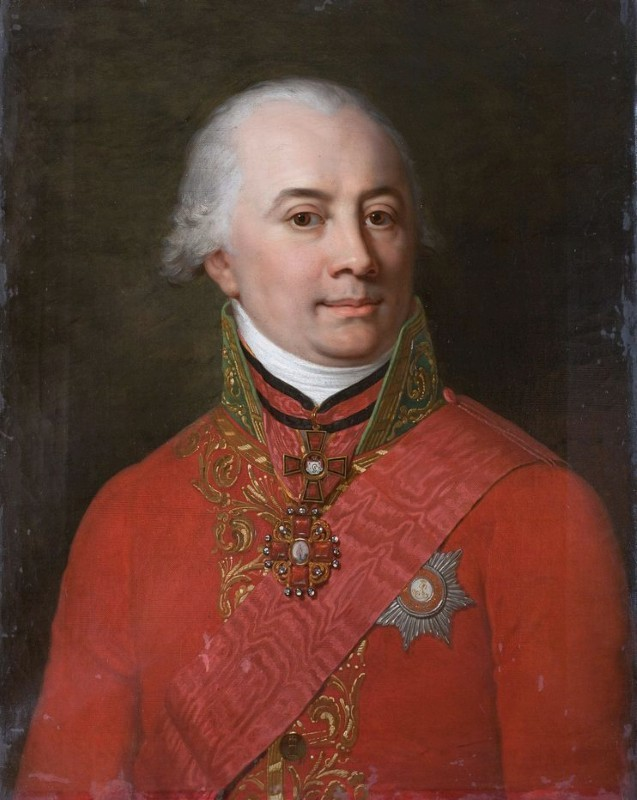

Mikhail Nikitich Muravyov or Murav'ev (Russian: Михаил Никитич Муравьёв; 5 November 1757 [O.S. 25 October] – 10 August 1807 [O.S. 29 July]) was a Russian poet and prose writer, "one of the best educated and most versatile writers of his generation in Russia". He was influenced by Mikhail Kheraskov and Nikolay Novikov, who invited his contributions to the Masonic publication Utrenni svet.

== Works ==
- Стихотворения [Poems], Leningrad, 1967
- Institutiones rhetoricae: a treatise of a Russian sentimentalist, ed. by Andrew Kahn. Oxford: W.A. Meeuws, 1995.
