= Jean-Charles Le Vasseur =

French engraver (1734–1816)

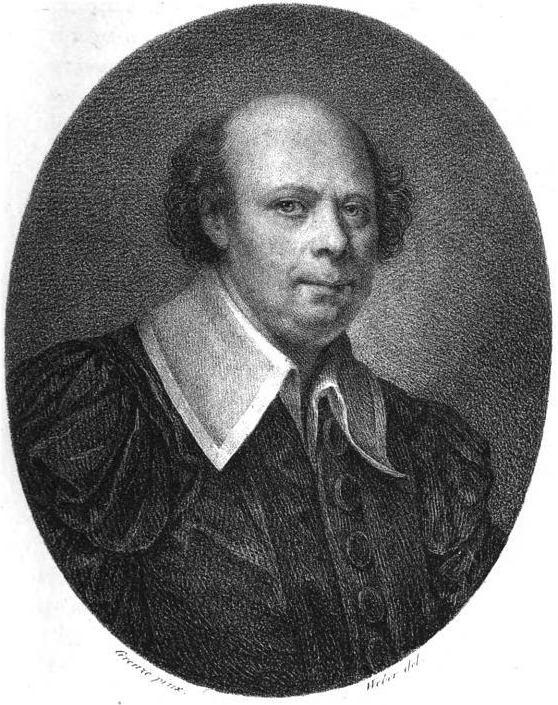
Jean-Charles Le Vasseur, by Jean-Baptiste Greuze

Jean-Charles Le Vasseur (21 October 1734, Abbeville - 29 November 1816, Paris) was a French engraver and printmaker.

== Biography ==
He was the descendent of an old family from Ponthieu. While still very young, he went to Paris to pursue a career in the arts. At the age of nineteen, he studied engraving with Jacques Firmin Beauvarlet and Jean Daullé, successively. He assiduously sought to vary his style according to the styles of the painters who entrusted their works to him for reproduction.

In 1770, he engraved a portrait of Marie-Antoinette, shortly after her marriage to the Dauphin (later, Louis XVI). It was based on paintings by Joseph Kranzinger and Joseph Ducreux. The following year, he was formally received at the Académie royale for "Diane et Endymion", after a work by Charles André van Loo. During this period, he began producing illustrations for a large number of books. He also took students on a regular basis, many of whom became well known.

Although his sources were eclectic, he did show a marked preference for certain painters, such as Jean-Baptiste Greuze, who became a good friend. His portrait of Le Vasseur made him known in a genre for which, up to that time, he had received little attention.

He was a Dean at the Académie, and never aspired to a higher position. He avoided becoming involved in any intrigues, but was always prepared to provide a safe haven for church officials during the Revolution; an activity that cost him much of his considerable fortune.

Despite this, he continued to work, waiting for the unrest to end so he could present his creations to the public. In 1814, when Louis XVIII became King, he dedicated a large scene of the Holy Family to Cardinal Talleyrand.

His works are in the collections of numerous museums throughout France, in the Musée Magnin and the Musée du Louvre, among many others, including the Musée Boucher-de-Perthes, in his hometown of Abbeville. A few are in the Netherlands, Sweden, and the United States; at the National Gallery of Art and the De Young Museum in San Francisco.

== Selected works ==
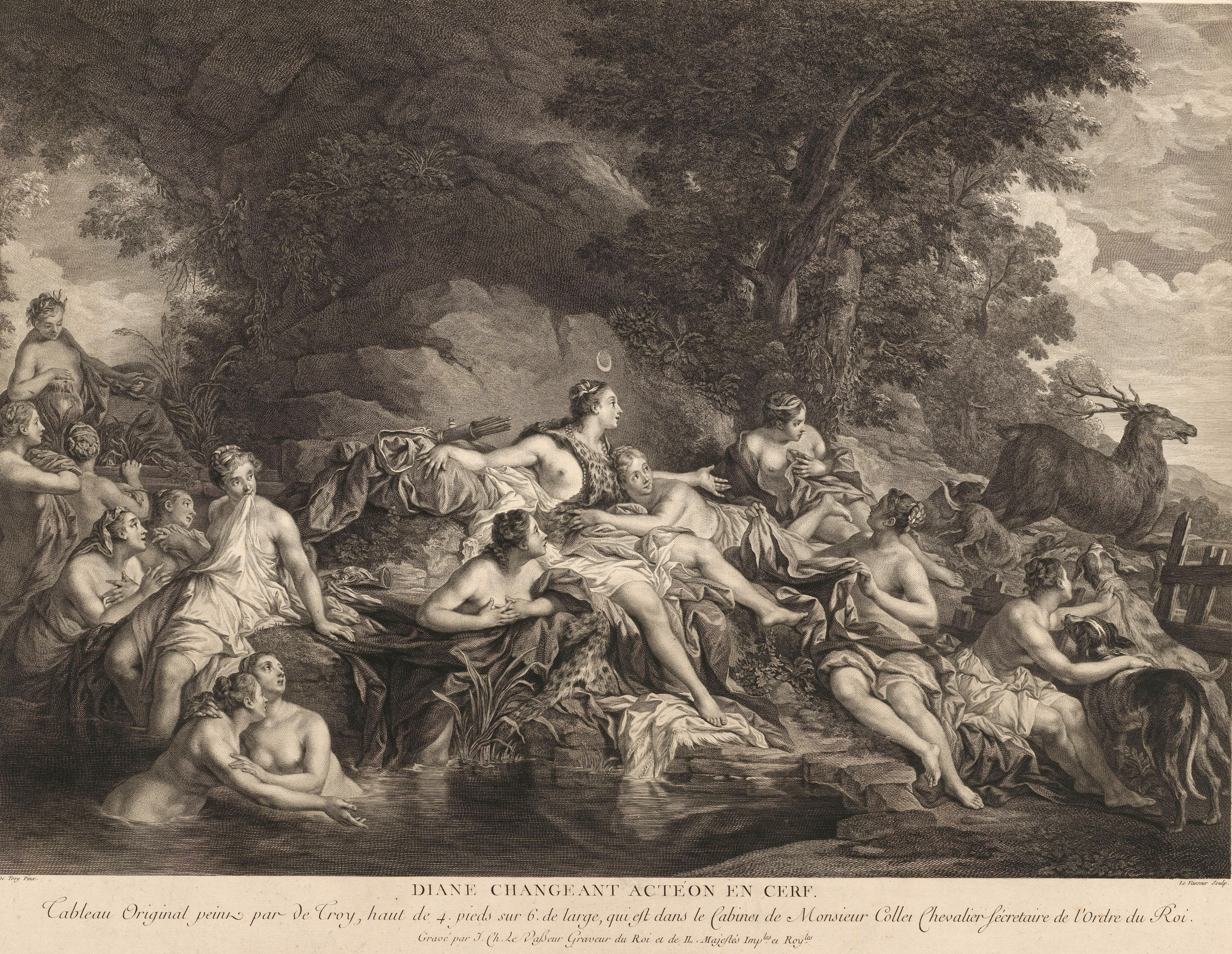
Diana Changing Actaeon into a Stag (after Jean-François de Troy)

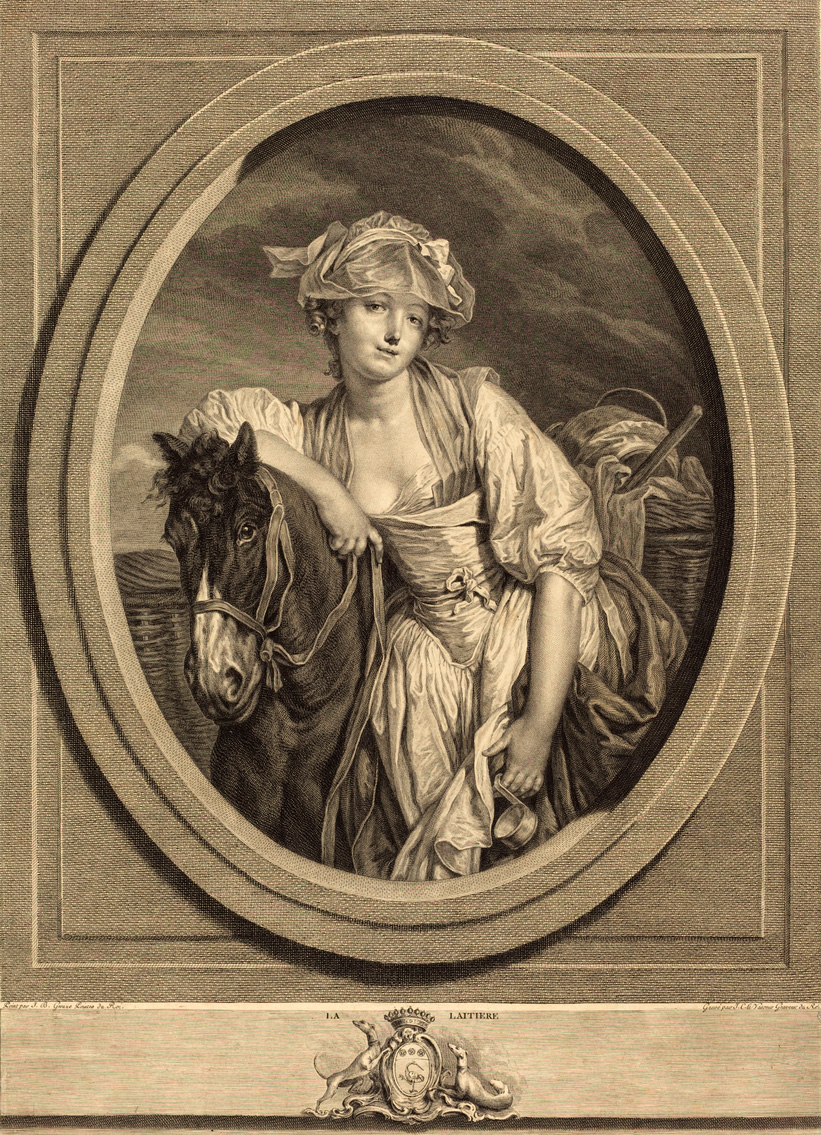
The Milk Girl (after Jean-Baptiste Greuze)

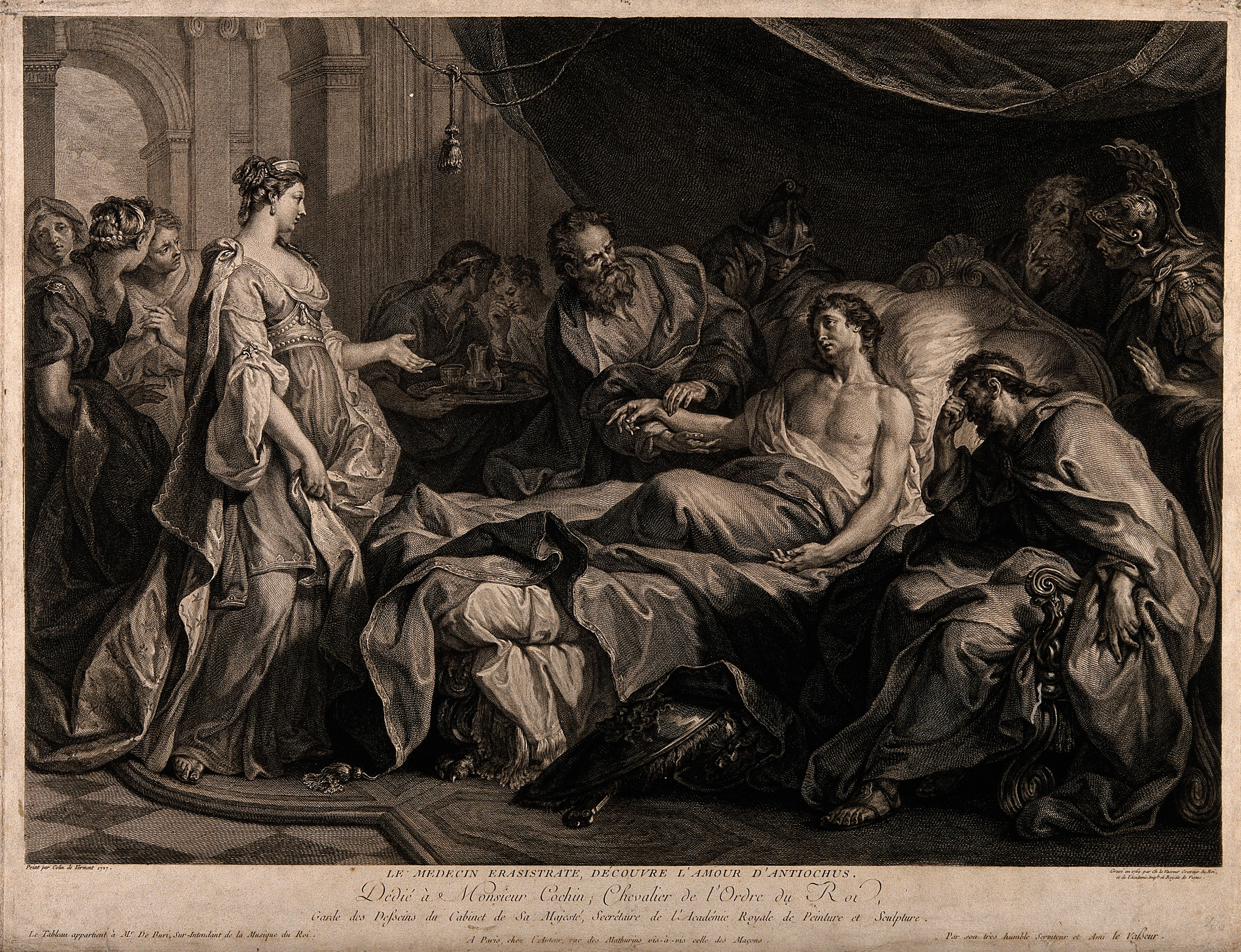
Doctor Erasistratus Discovers the Love of Antiochus (after Hyacinthe Collin de Vermont)

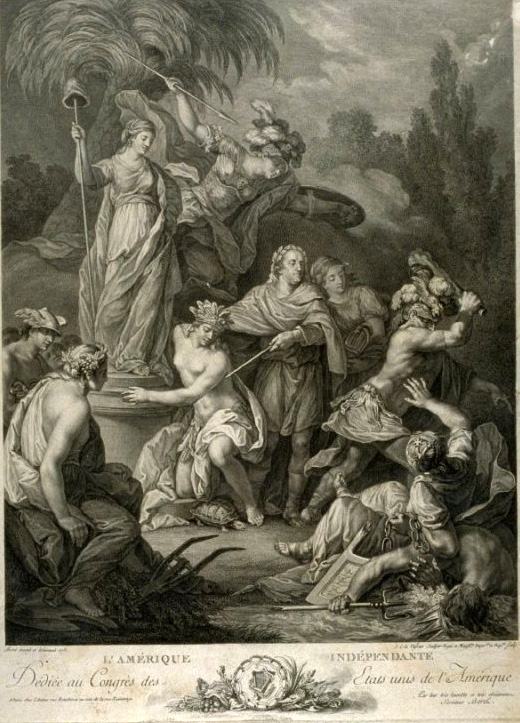
Independent America and the Glorification of Benjamin Franklin
