= Joseph Kranzinger =

Austrian painter (1731–1775)

Joseph Kranzinger (alternatively Krantzinger; 14 February 1731 in Mattsee – 27 March 1775 in Versailles) was an Austrian Rococo style pastel painter, best remembered for being commissioned by the Menus-Plaisirs du Roi to paint a portrait of Marie Antoinette in 1769, and for a later painting of the French queen which was misattributed to Jean-Étienne Liotard.
