= Sovetsky pisatel =

Soviet and Russian book publisher

Sovetsky Pisatel (Russian: Советский писатель, romanized: Sovetskij pisatel, lit. "Soviet Writer") is a Soviet and Russian book publisher headquartered in Moscow, Russia. It focused on releasing the new works of Soviet authors. It was established in 1934, since 1938 served as the publisher for the Union of Soviet Writers, in 1992 it was turned into a commercial organization, owned by Arseny Larionov.

The company was founded by the Union of Soviet Writers' organising committee prior to the First Congress of Soviet Writers in 1933. It was then called Sovetskaya Literatura (Советская литература, "Soviet Literature"). Sovetsky Pisatel was the result of a merger between Sovetskaya Literatura and two Soviet publishing companies —Moscow Writers Partnership (Russian: Московское товарищество писателей, romanized: Moskovskoe tovarishhestvo pisatelej) and Writers' Publishing House in Leningrad (Russian: Издательство писателей в Ленинграде, romanized: Izdatelstvo pisatelej v Leningrade)—in 1934. The first books under that title were published after the First Congress of the Soviet Writers in November 1934.

The company had offices in Moscow and Leningrad. In Soviet era the publisher released about 500 titles a year, 40% of which were foreign books translated from the languages of the Soviet Union. Since 1938 it was controlled and operated by the Union of Soviet Writers.

With the dissolution of the Soviet Union the Union of Soviet Writers ceased to exist. The Leningrad department of Sovetsky Pisatel ceased operations in 1992. The Moscow department was transformed into a limited liability company, and another book publishing company Sovremenniy Pisatel (Russian: Современный писатель, romanized: Sovremennyj pisatel, lit. "a contemporary writer") was established on its basis, but it was later renamed back to Sovetsky Pisatel.
