= Belsky (surname) =

Belsky (Russian: Бельский, pl. Бельские) is a Russian surname. When transliterated as Bielski it can also refer to a Polish family of the same name.

- Three different families bearing the name were prominent in Russian history:
  - The Gediminid Belsky princely family of the 15th and 16th centuries (ended in 1571)
  - The Belsky noble family from the House of Yaroslavl
  - The commoner Belsky family of the 16th and 17th centuries, a family of Russian government administrators. It flourished from ca. 1570 to 1611 and was not related to either the Gediminid or Yaroslavl families. The most prominent of them were Malyuta Skuratov (Grigory Lukyanovich Skuratov-Belskiy, died in 1573) and Bogdan Belsky (died in 1611).

Notable individuals bearing the name include:

- Abram Belskie (1907–1988), British sculptor
- Alexei Ivanovich Belsky (1726–1796), Russian painter
- Franta Belsky (1921–2000), Czech sculptor
- Belsky (cartoonist), (1919 - 1989) Margaret (née Owen) Belsky, a British cartoonist. Her husband was the Czech sculptor Franta Belsky.
- Grigory Lukyanovich Skuratov-Belsky (fl. 16th century)
- Harold Simon Belsky (1929–2019), American musician a.k.a. Hal Blaine
- Igor Belsky (1925–1999), Russian ballet dancer and choreographer
- Ivan Ivanovich Belsky (1719–1799), Russian painter
- Jay Belsky (born 1952), American child psychologist
- Josh Belsky (born 1966), an American (sports) sailor
- Nikolay Bogdanov-Belsky (1868–1945), Russian painter
- Scott Belsky (born 1980), American entrepreneur, author and early-stage investor
- Vladimir Belsky (1866–1946), Russian poet and librettist
- Rabbi Yisroel Belsky (1938–2016), American religious leader
