= Ivan Belsky =

Ivan Belsky may refer to:

- Ivan Vladimirovich Belsky (fl. 1422–1445), first prince of the Gediminid Belsky family
- Ivan Feodorovich Belsky (c. 1501–1542), principal Gediminid Belsky in the Kazan-campaign and regency periods
- Ivan Dmitrievich Belsky (died 1571), last prince of the Gediminid Belsky family
- Ivan Ivanovich Belsky (1719–1799), Russian painter

See also:

- "Ivan Belsky", rare corruption of Ivan Betskoy (1704–1795), Russian noble and education administrator
