= Grand Church of the Winter Palace =

Cathedral within the Winter Palace of Saint Petersburg, Russia

Coordinates: 59°56′26″N 30°18′56″E

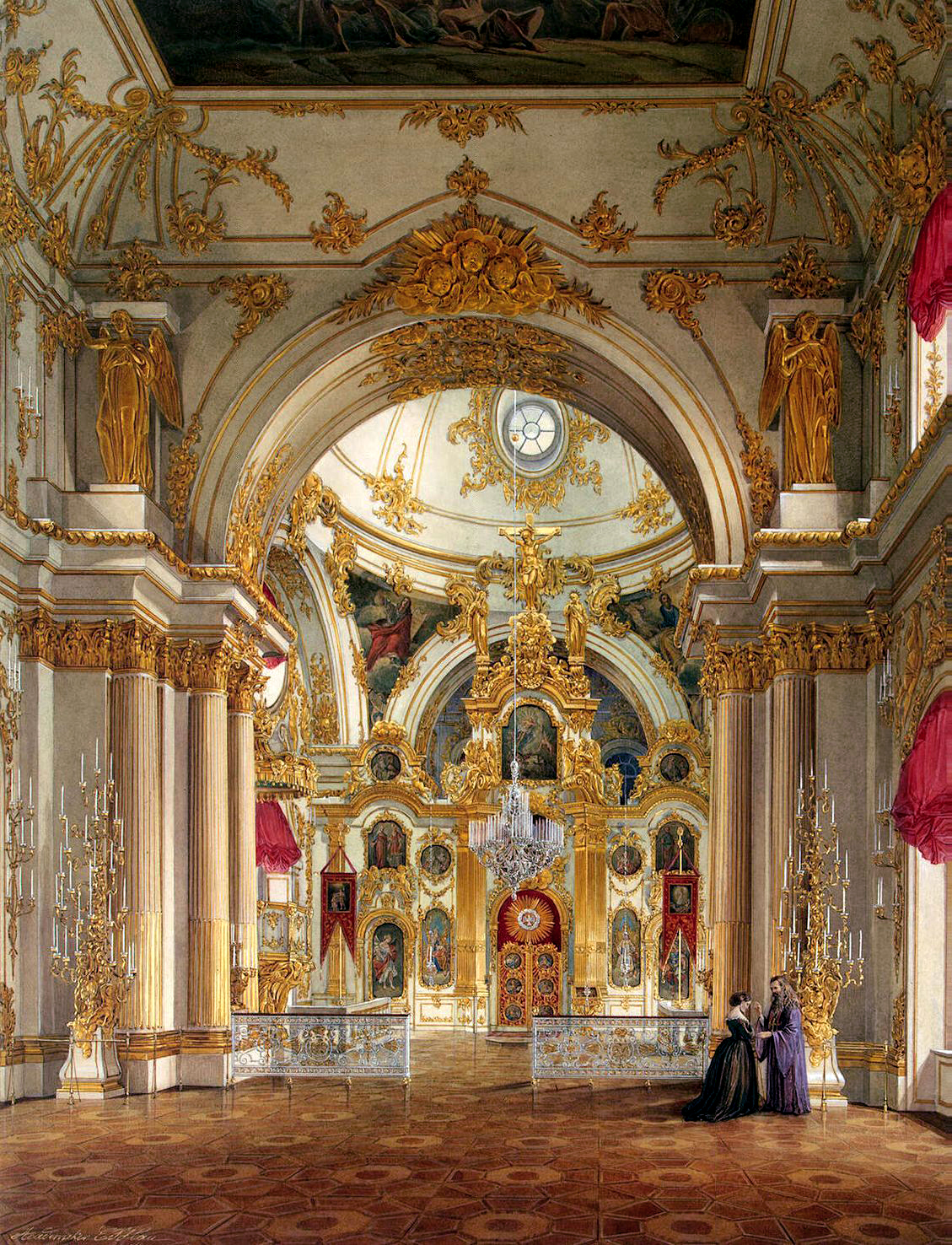
The Cathedral of the Not-Made-by-Hand Image of Our Saviour in the Winter Palace, by Eduard Hau (1866).

The Grand Church of the Winter Palace (Russian: Собор Спаса Нерукотворного Образа в Зимнем дворце) in Saint Petersburg, sometimes referred to as the Winter Palace's cathedral, was consecrated in 1763. It is located on the piano nobile in the eastern wing of the Winter Palace, and is the larger, and principal, of two churches within the palace. A smaller, more private church was constructed in 1768, near the private apartment in the northwest part of the wing. The Grand Church was designed by Francesco Rastrelli, and has been described as "one of the most splendid rooms" in the palace. Today, the church is an unconsecrated exhibition hall of the State Hermitage Museum.

== History ==
The Winter Palace's Grand Church in 1828, by Alexei Tyranov.

Construction of the church began on 14 October 1753 (Julian calendar). Six years later, the interior design was executed by the Italian artists Carlo Zucci, Francesco Martini, Giovanni Antonio Veneroni and the sculptor G. B. Gianni. Rastrelli was personally in charge of the three-tier iconostasis where the icons were painted by Ivan Ivanovich Belsky and Ivan Vishnyakov. The Italian Francesco Fontebasso painted the evangelists in the church's spandrels and the "Resurrection of Christ" plafond in the vestibule.

The Grand Church was one of the final parts of the palace to be completed. When the palace was first inhabited on 6 April 1762, the cathedral was not yet completed, so a temporary Church of the Resurrection of Christ was consecrated by Archbishop Dimitry Sechenov of Novgorod.

On 12 July 1763, Archbishop Gavriil Kremenetsky of St Petersburg consecrated the Grand Church in the name of the Image of Our Saviour Not-Made-by-Hands. This eponymous icon, painted by Feodor Ukhtomsky in 1693 and lavishly decorated with gold and diamonds, was placed near the sanctuary.

== Architecture of the Grand Church ==
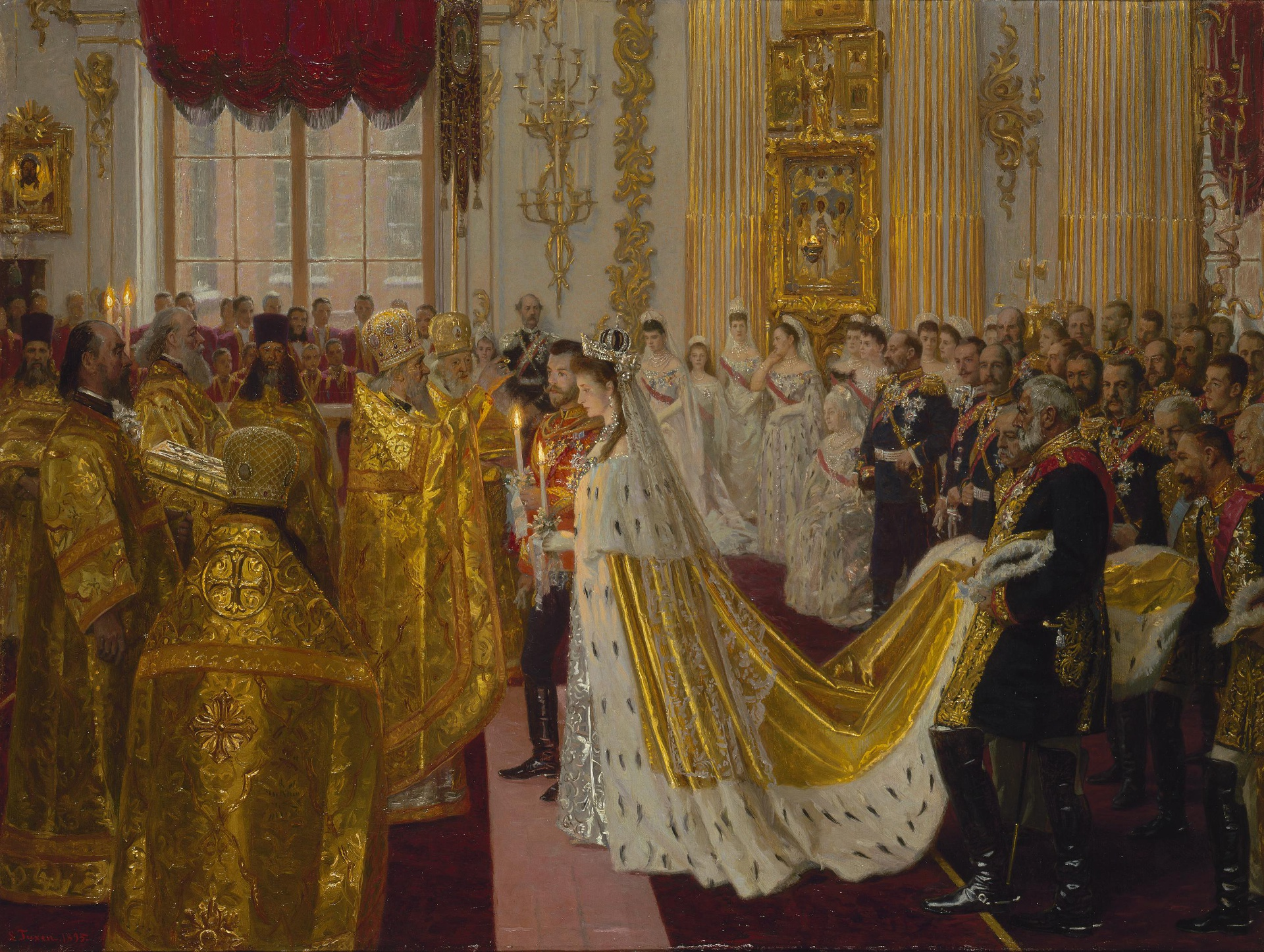
Portrait by Laurits Tuxen of the wedding of Tsar Nicholas II and the Princess Alix of Hesse-Darmstadt, which took place at the Chapel of the Winter Palace, St. Petersburg, on 14/26 November 1894.

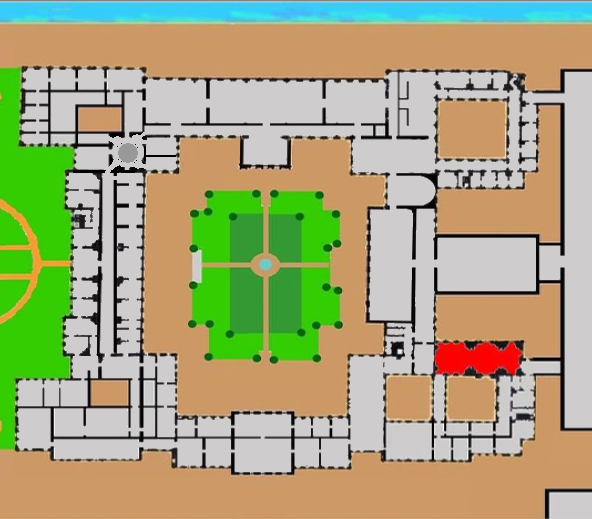
Location of the Grand Church within the Winter Palace.

The Grand Church and the palace's Jordan Staircase are one of the few parts of the palace to retain the original rococo decorative scheme devised by Francesco Bartolomeo Rastrelli. This was faithfully copied by Vasily Stasov when he was commissioned to rebuild the palace following the disastrous fire that destroyed most of the original palace interiors in 1837. However, the new intricate decoration was mostly made of moulded papier-mâché, rather than wood.

As before the fire, the church is sub-divided by Corinthian columns and pilasters into three distinct areas, brightly lit by large windows on opposite sides, the central area being covered by a dome. The walls of the church are richly embellished with gilded stucco in rococo design. The ceiling depicts the Ascension of Christ by Pyotr Basinm, while the lunettes beneath the dome depict Saints Matthew, Mark, Luke and John by Fiodor Bruni. The restored cathedral was consecrated on 25 March 1839 by Metropolitan Filaret (Drozdov) of Moscow.

The cathedral was the repository of multiple relics and memorabilia related to the Romanovs. It was used as the imperial family's private place of worship, with the imperial family's members usually praying in a special room beyond the sanctuary. This was the place where Nicholas II prayed at the liturgy before exiting onto the balcony to face the crowd on the day of declaring war on Germany in 1914.

== The Grand Church today ==
In May 1918, the cathedral was officially closed for worship. It is now used as an exhibition hall of the Hermitage Museum. Restoration work undertaken from 2012 until 2014 is described by the State Museum as a "recreation of the original design of the Court Cathedral" and "The icons, the candelabra, the standard lamps and pieces of the iconostasis, the pulpit, the lantern and the altar canopy were returned to their original place".

== Gallery ==
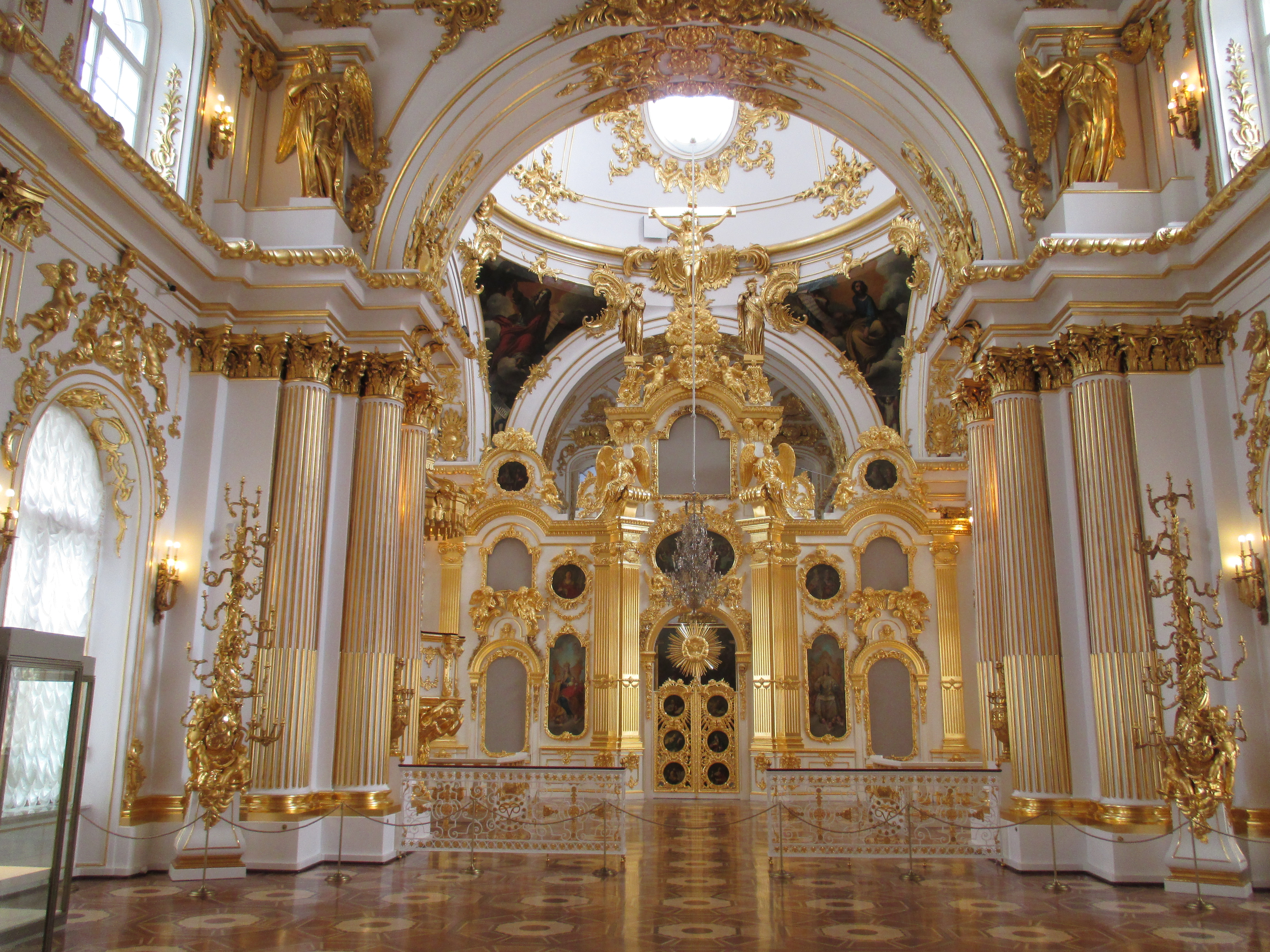
The Great Church of the Winter Palace in Saint Petersburg

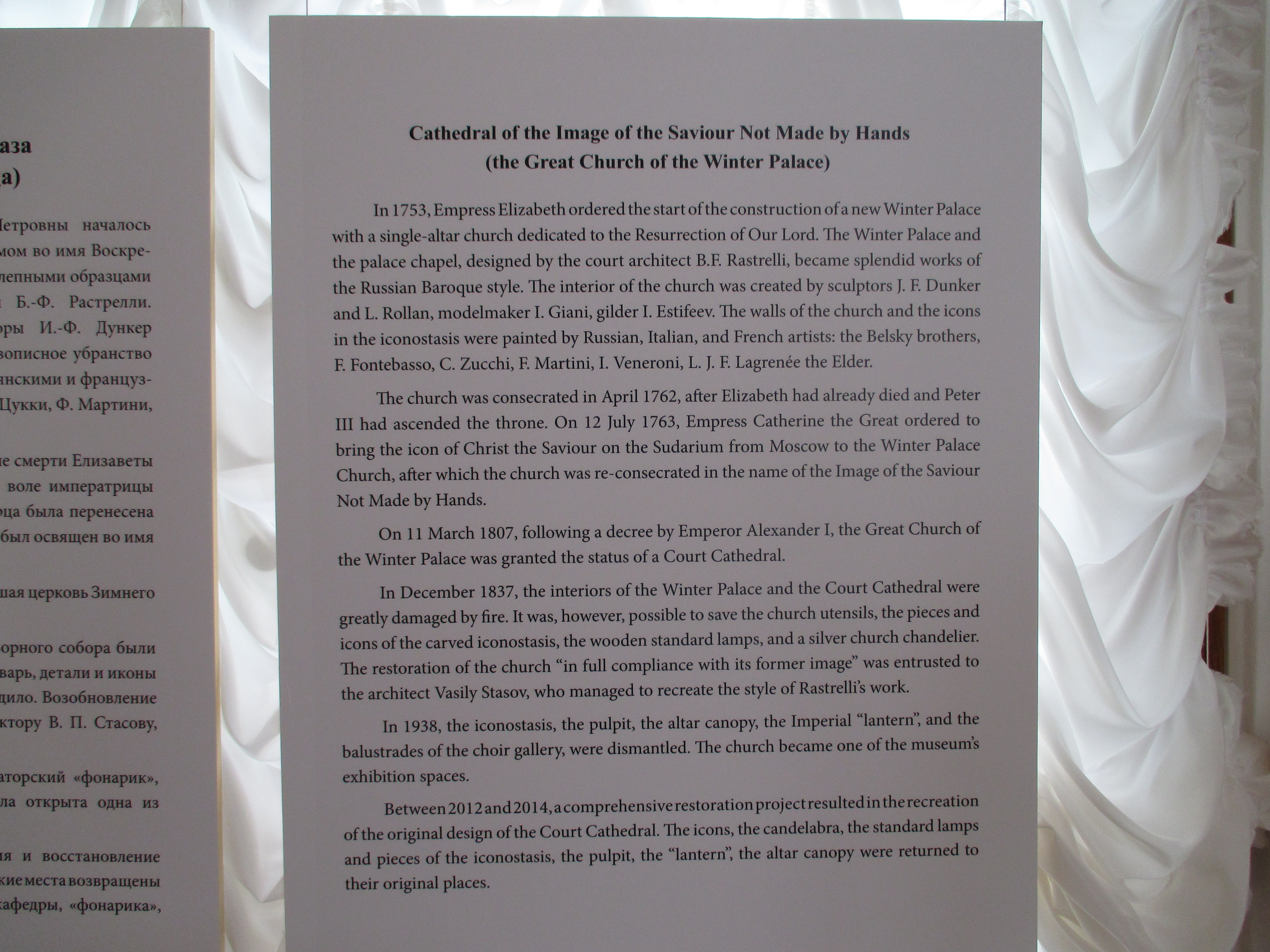
History as described by the State Hermitage Museum

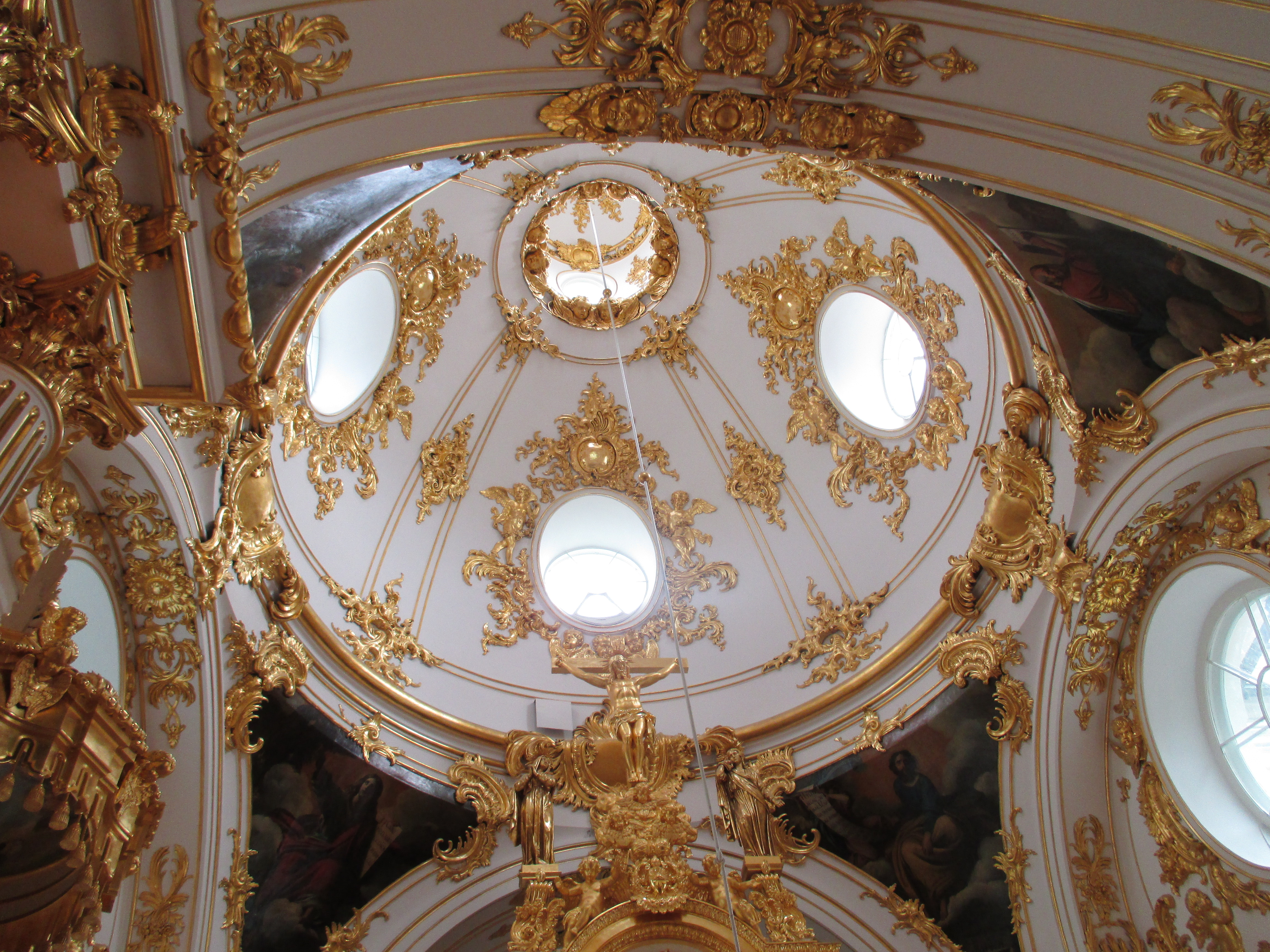
Dome interior

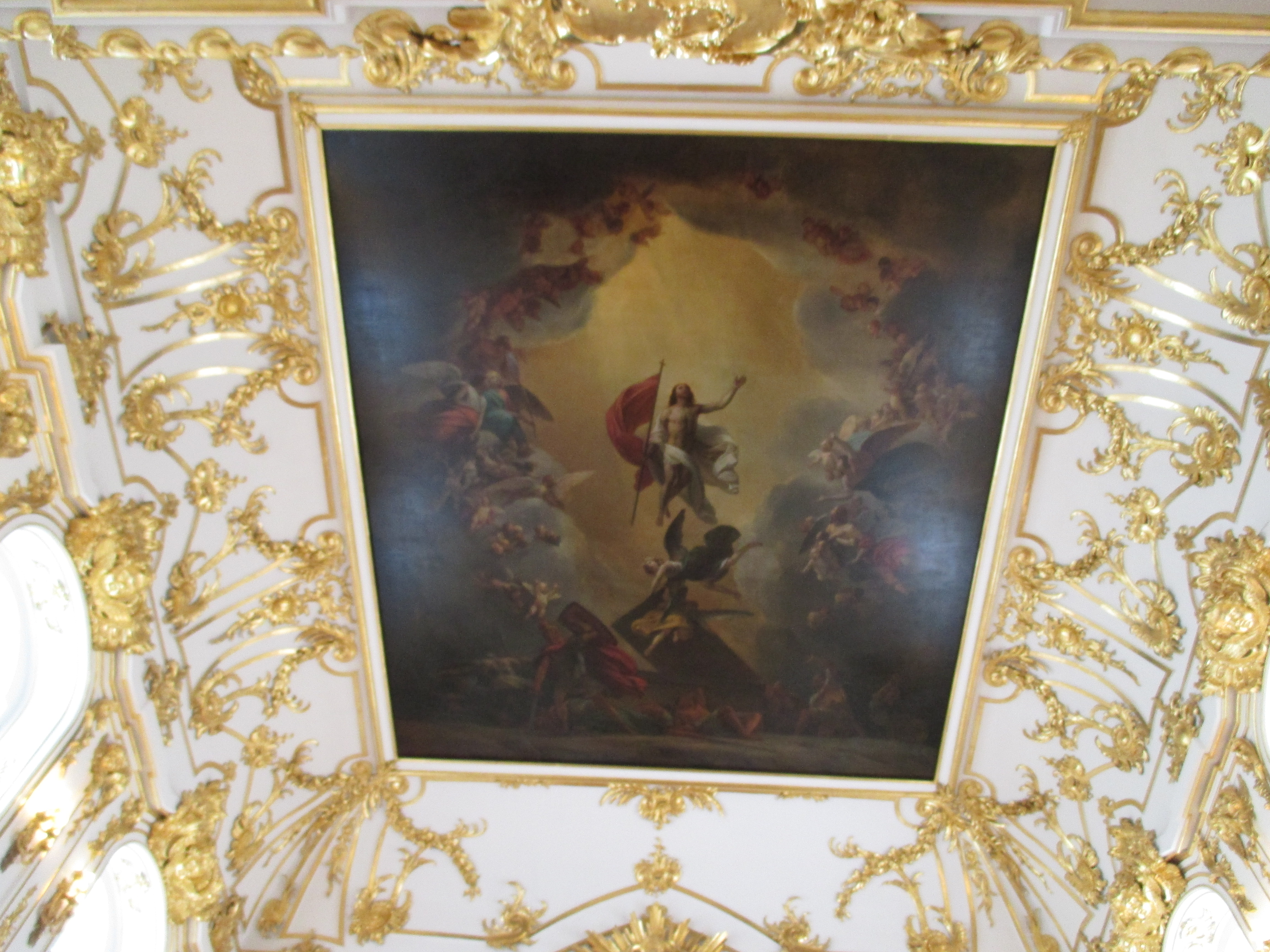
Ceiling

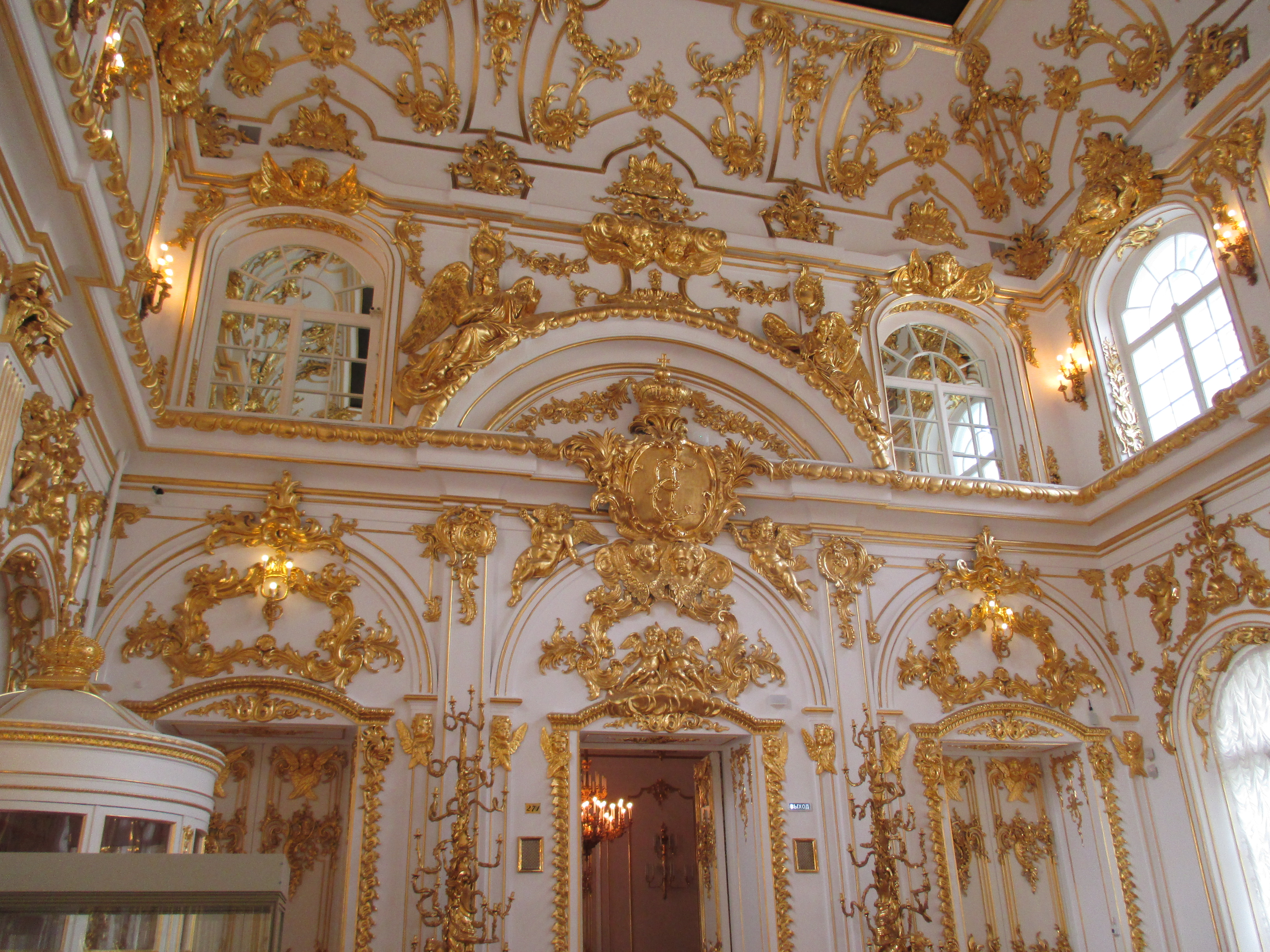
Western wall (entrance)

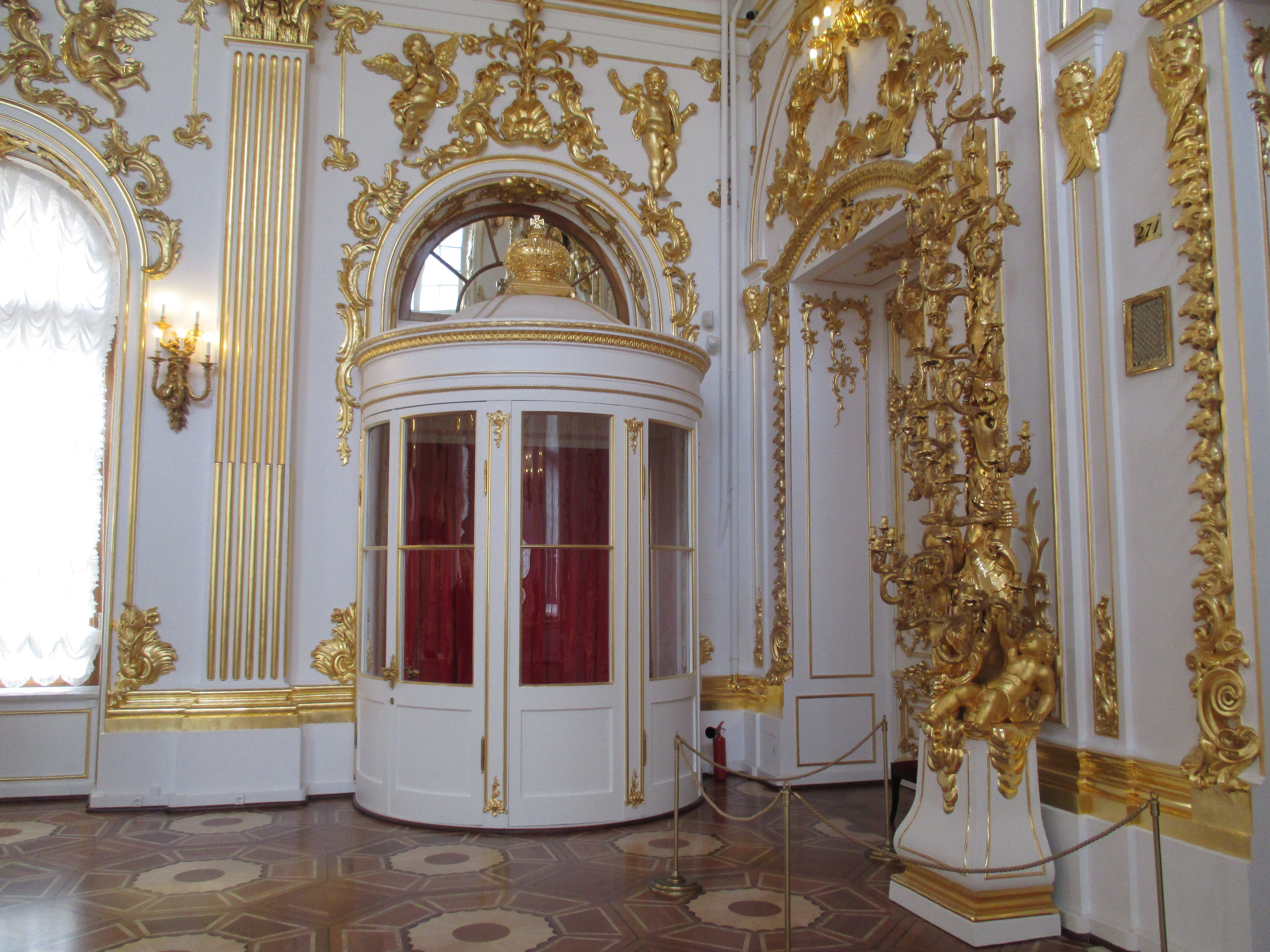
Southern wall

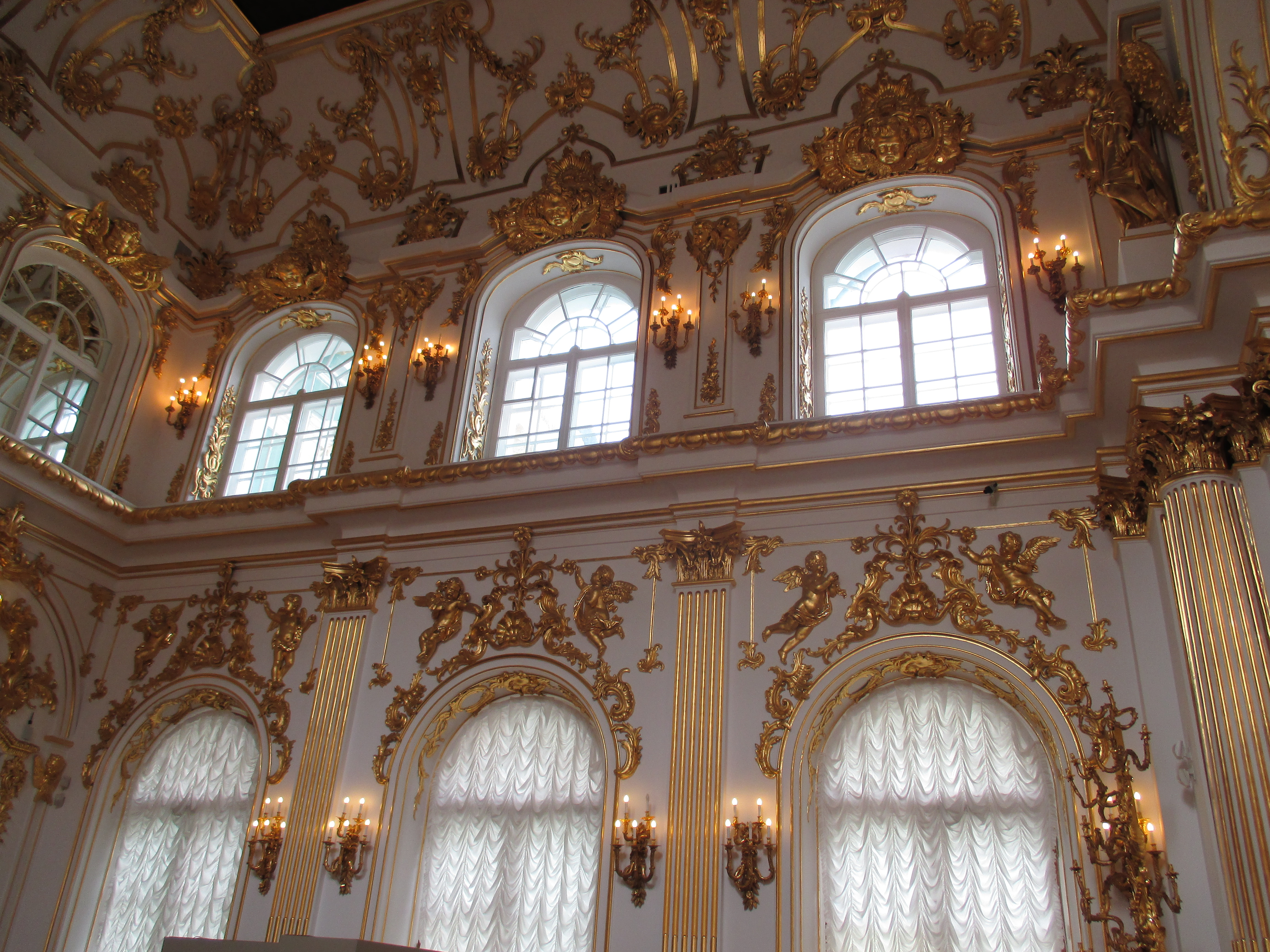
Southern wall decoration

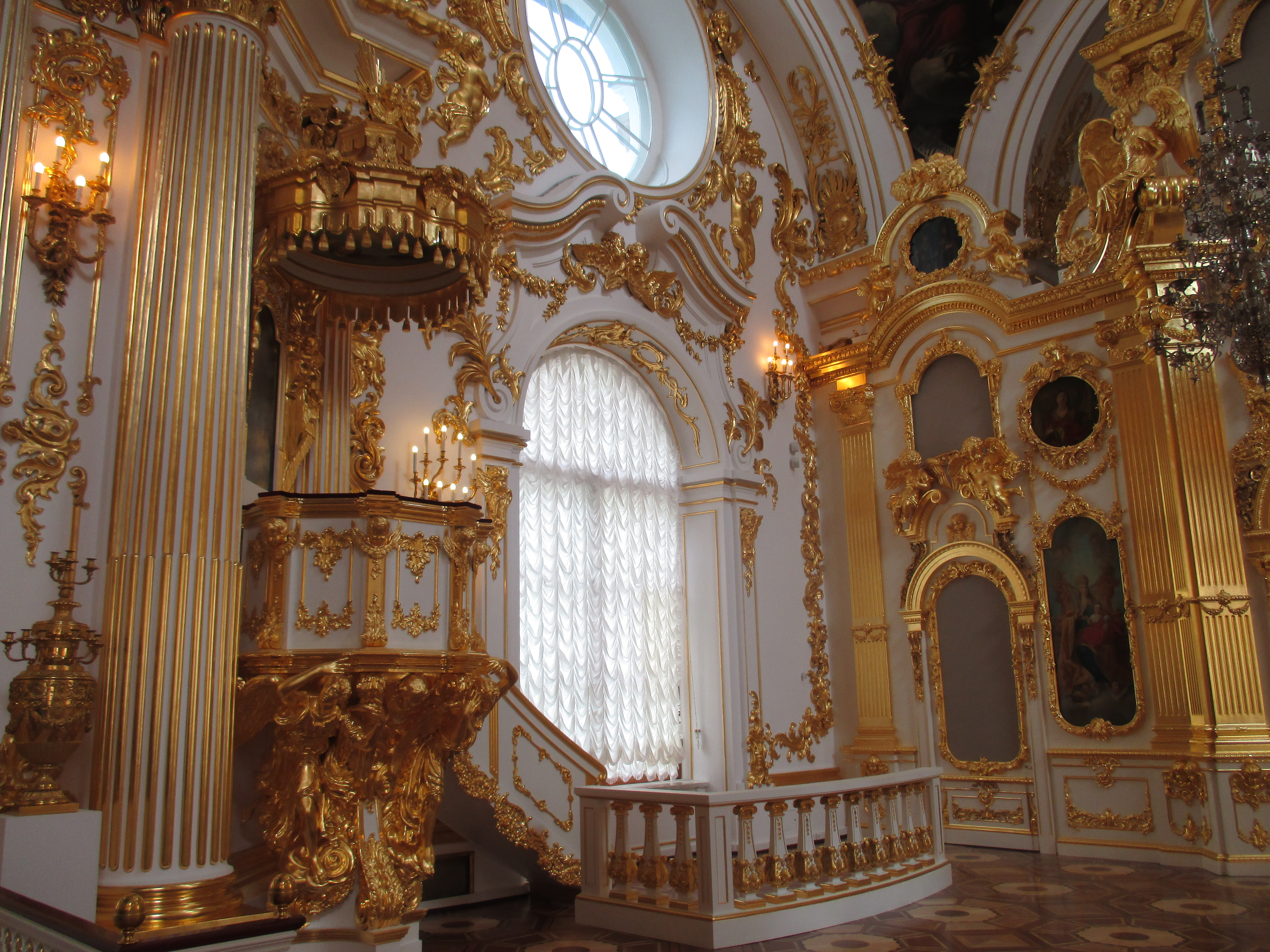
The pulpit
