= Ivan Firsov =

Russian painter

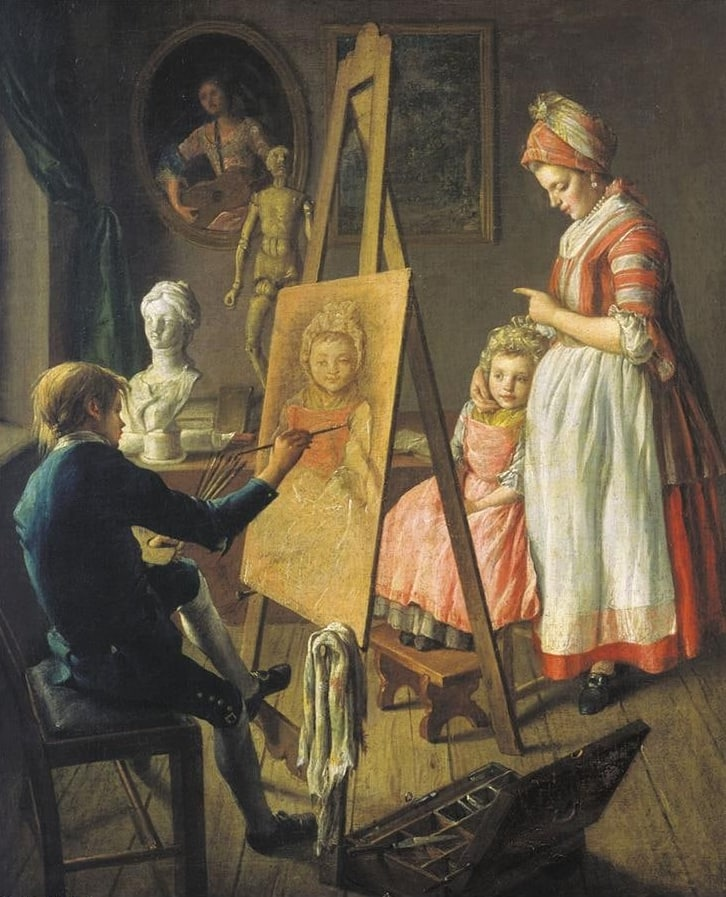
The Young Painter (1760s)

Ivan Firsov (Russian: Иван Иванович Фирсов, c.1733 in Moscow – c.1785 in Saint-Petersburg) was a Russian painter.

== Life ==
He studied and worked at the "Chancellory of Buildings" (Канцелярия от строений) from 1747 to 1756, and was a pupil of Ivan Vishnyakov. In the late 1750s, he became a Court Painter. In that office, he created decorative paintings in the palaces and churches, designed costumes and other appurtenances for festivals, painted icons and created theatrical scenery.

His canvas, "The Young Painter" is one of the first works of Russian genre art. It was done during or immediately after a stay in Paris, where he had been sent to study at the Royal Academy of Painting and Sculpture. It is currently in the Tretyakov Gallery.

== Sources ==
- In the original Russian, this article incorporates text from the Brockhaus and Efron Encyclopedic Dictionary (1890-1907).
