= Pyotr Drozhdin =

Russian painter

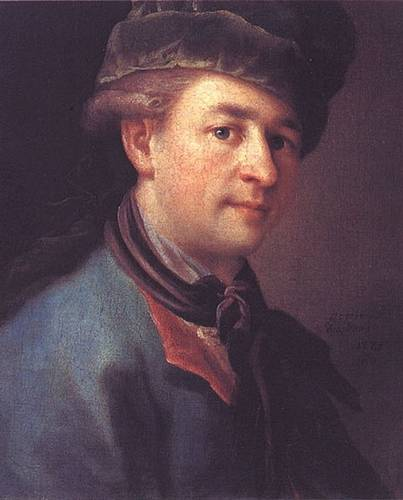
Self-Portrait, 1775, in the Tretyakov Gallery

Pyotr Semyonovich Drozhdin (Russian: Пётр Семёнович Дрождин; 1745 – 1805) was a Russian painter. He studied in St. Petersburg under Alexei Antropov and Dmitri Levitsky, and was granted the title of Academician in 1785.

== Gallery ==
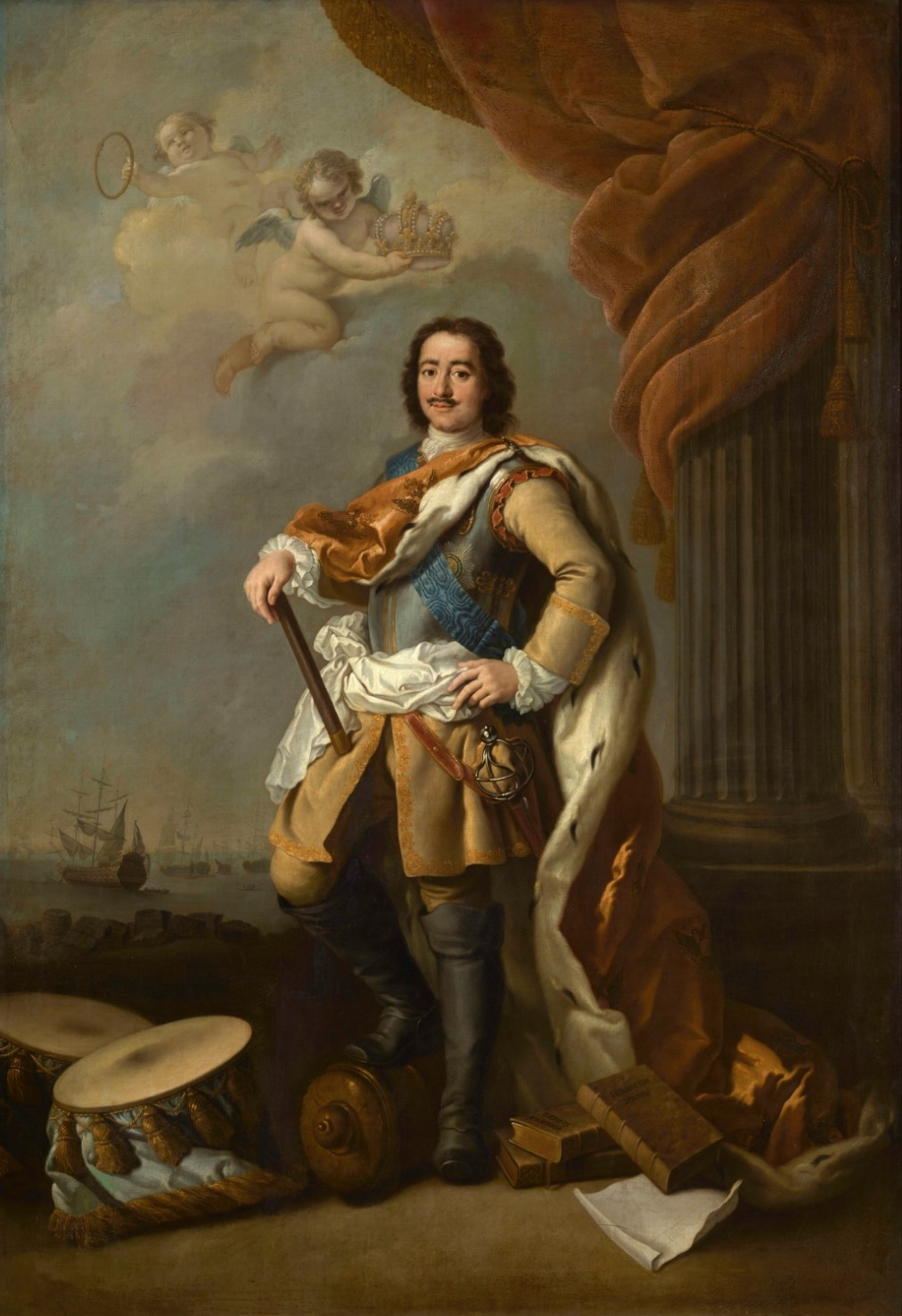
Peter the Great, 1795 (Russian Museum)

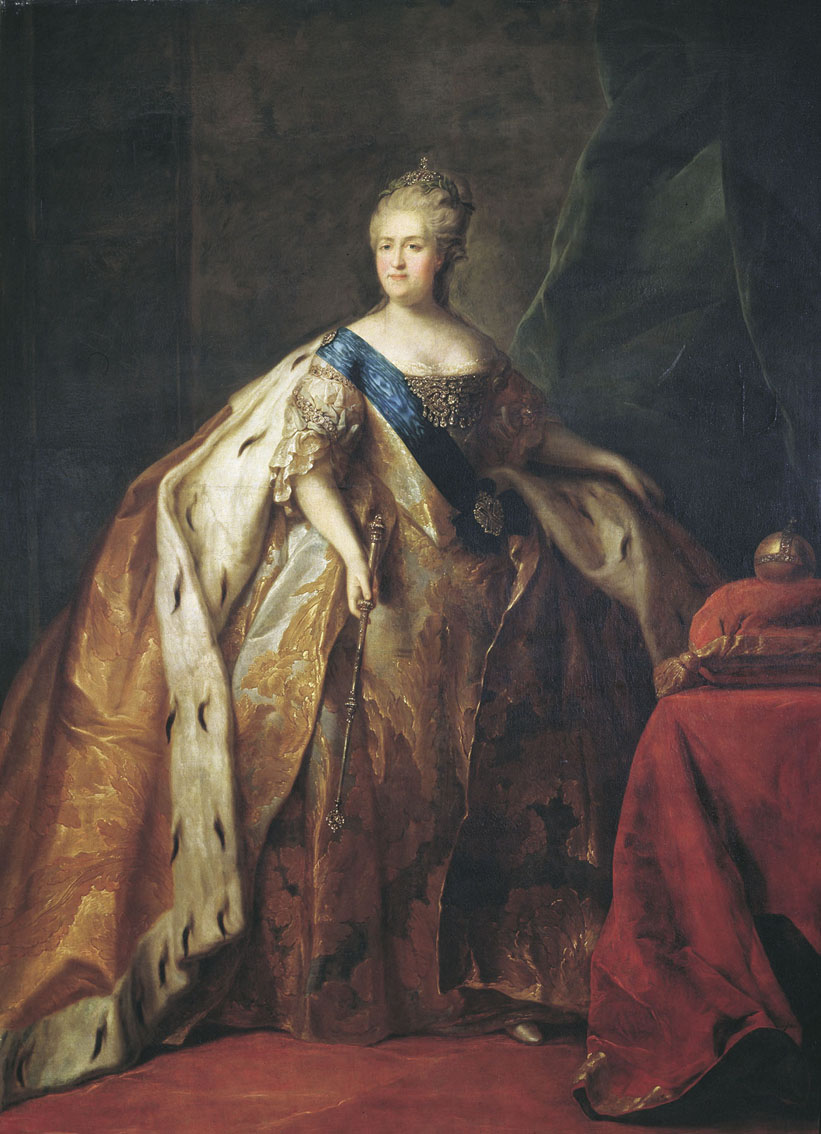
Catherine the Great, 1796 (Tretyakov Gallery)

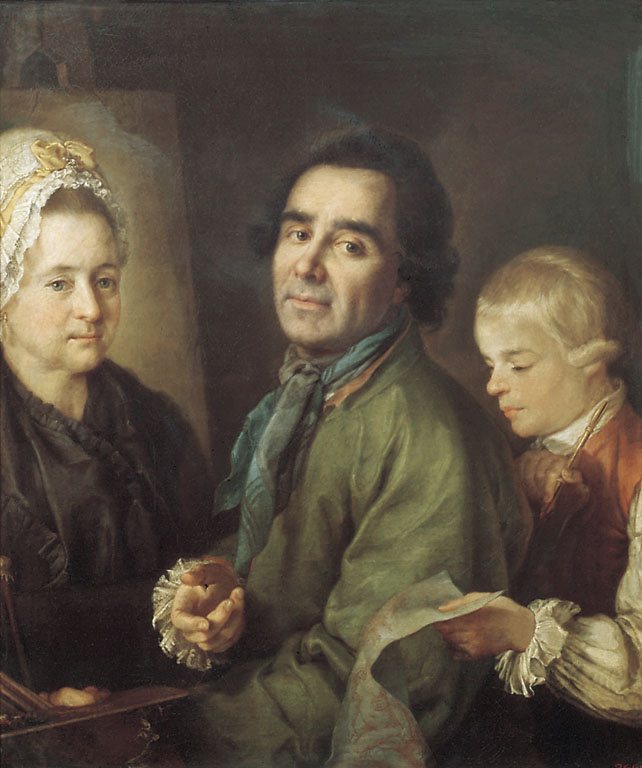
Painter Aleksey Antropov with his son in front of the portrait of his wife Yelena Vasilyevna, 1776 (Russian Museum)
