= Aleksey Antropov =

Russian painter (1716–1795)

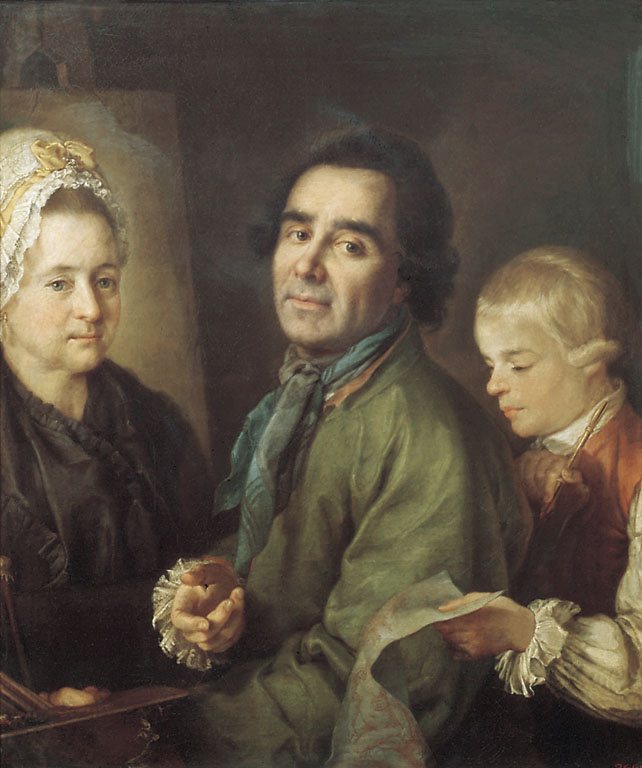
Portrait by Pyotr Drozhdin, 1776

Aleksey Petrovich Antropov (Russian: Алексей Петрович Антропов; 25 March [O.S. 14 March] 1716 – 23 June [O.S. 12 June] 1795) was a Russian painter active primarily in St. Petersburg, where he was born and died. He also worked in Moscow and frescoed churches in Kiev. His preferred medium was oil, but he also painted miniatures and icons.

== Life and work ==
Antropov was born to the family of a civil servant who worked in the Armory and the Office of Construction. Beginning in 1732, he studied at the Office of Construction under his relative Andrey Matveyev; from 1739, he worked there as part of the "painting team" under Ivan Vishnyakov. As a member of the team, Antropov took part in the frescoing of the Summer Palace, Winter Palace, Anichkov Palace, and other buildings of Saint Petersburg. He also studied portrait art from the court painter Louis Caravaque of France. In 1749 Antropov received the rank of the Painter's Apprentice and at the end of the 1750s the rank of the Master Painter.

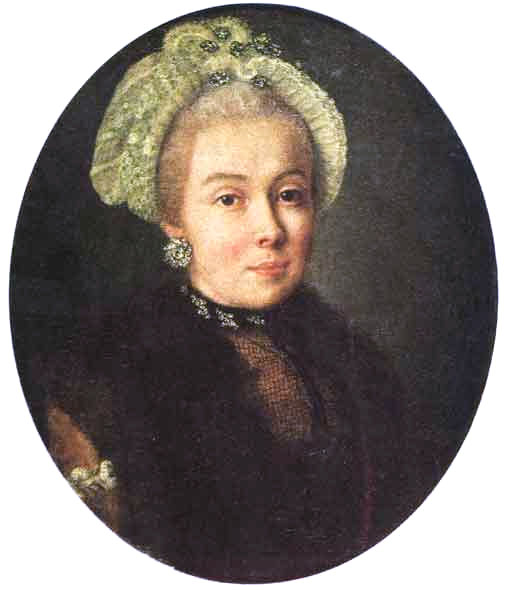
Unknown lady, 1760s

In 1752-1755, he worked on the interiors of the St Andrew's Church in Kiev. He supervised the installation of the iconostasis and frescoed cupolas and walls. The most prominent of his frescoes in the church is the Last Supper in the altar.

He started to paint portraits before his Kiev period. The earliest known portraits of his are portraits of Elizabeth of Russia. He did not meet his model, but based the paintings on the works of his teacher, Louis Caravaque.

From 1755 to 1757 he worked in Moscow frescoing the Golovkin palace. Here he met prince Ivan Shuvalov who supported Antropov's work for the rest of his life.

From 1757 to 1759 Antropov returned to Saint-Petersburg and obtained further instruction from court painter Pietro Rotari of Italy. Historians consider his portrait of A.M. Izmaylova to be a sort of a graduation work. The 1760s were probably the most productive period of the artist. He painted many portraits among the Portrait of Ataman Krasnoschekov, Portrait of Rumyantseva. Ivan Shuvalov planned to move him to Moscow, so Antropov could teach art the Moscow University. For some reason this plan was cancelled and Antropov instead got the job at the Synod of the Russian Orthodox Church, where he supervised icon painting, decorated the churches, drew the portraits of church hierarchs and supervised art students. Among his apprentices was Dmitry Levitzky, who actually lived in his teacher's house.

In 1762 Peter III of Russia became the new Emperor. Antropov soon became his favorite painter. For the six months of Peter III's rule, Antropov painted at least four of his portraits. After the palace revolt, the new Empress, Catherine II had a much lower opinion of Antropov's talents. At that time, artists preferred a soft combinations of colors and some flattering for the ceremonial portraits. Antropov preferred the traditional icon and parsuna portraits, based on a sharp contrast of colors with a dark background.

In 1789 Antropov made a personal sacrifice, transferring his only house to the Department of Education for organizing a Free School there. In 1795 Antropov died of a fever and was buried in the Lazarevskoe Cemetery at the Alexander Nevsky Monastery, in Saint Petersburg.

== Works ==
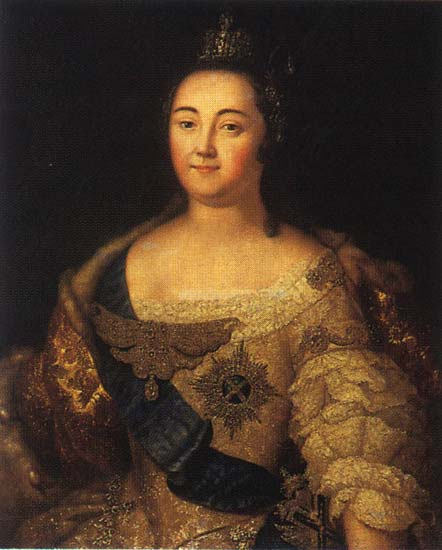
Elizabeth Petrovna

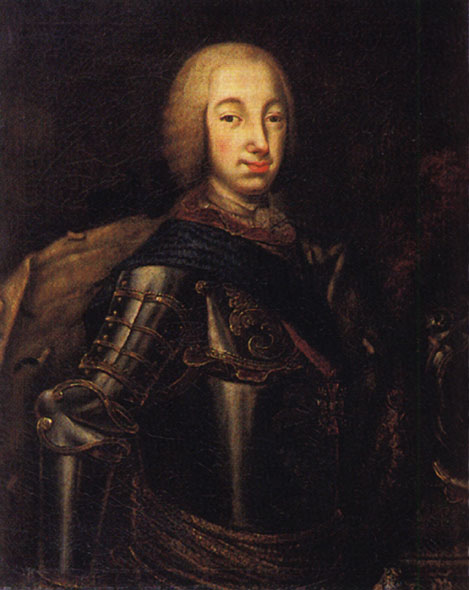
Grand Duke Peter (later Peter III)

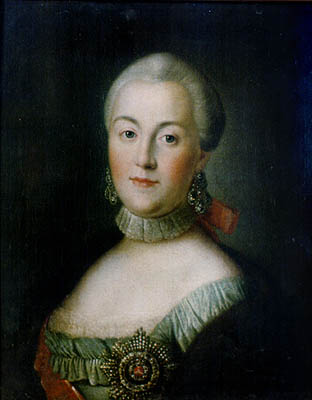
Grand Duchess Ekaterina Alekseyevna (future Catherine II)

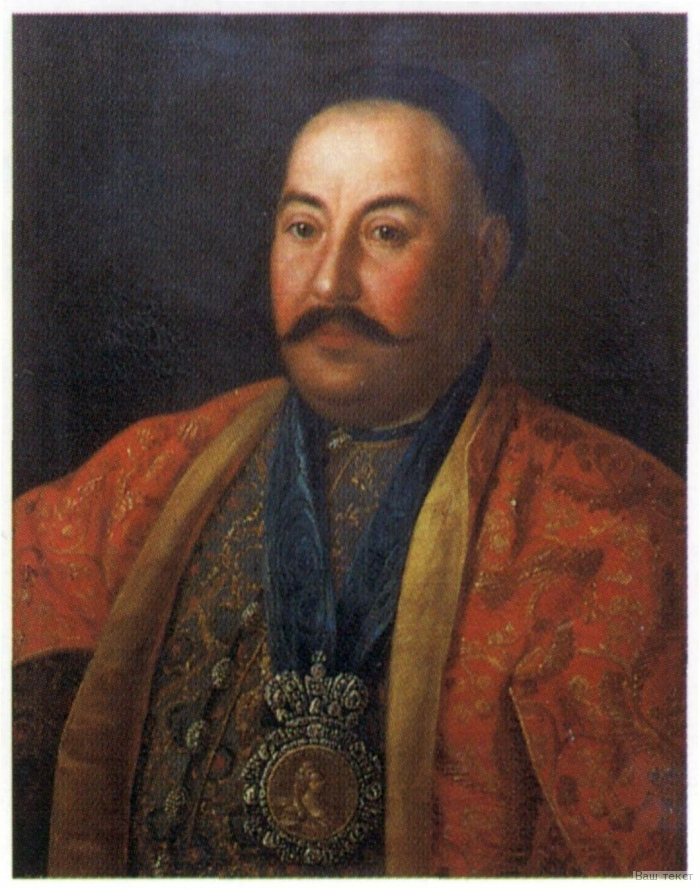
Ataman Krasnoshchekov, 1761

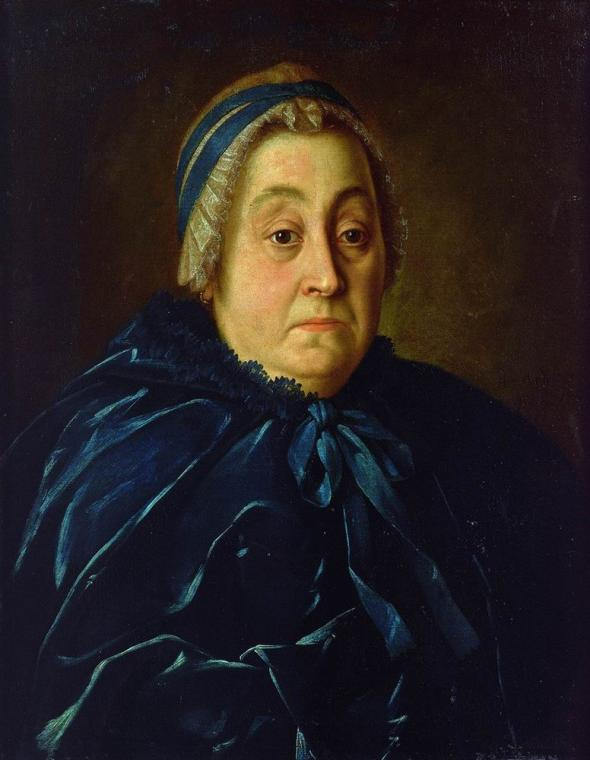
A.V. Buturlina, 1763

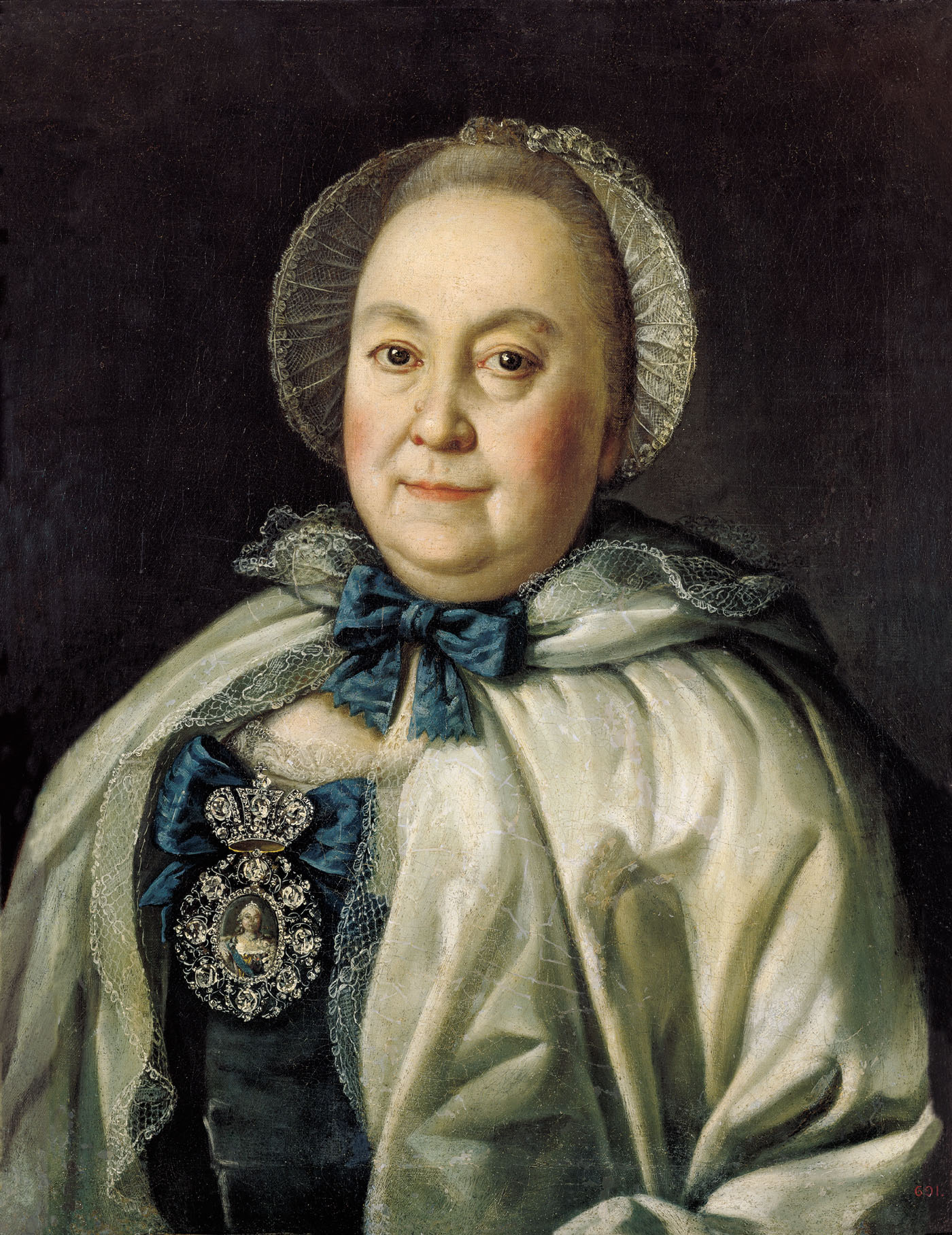
M.A. Rumyantseva, 1764

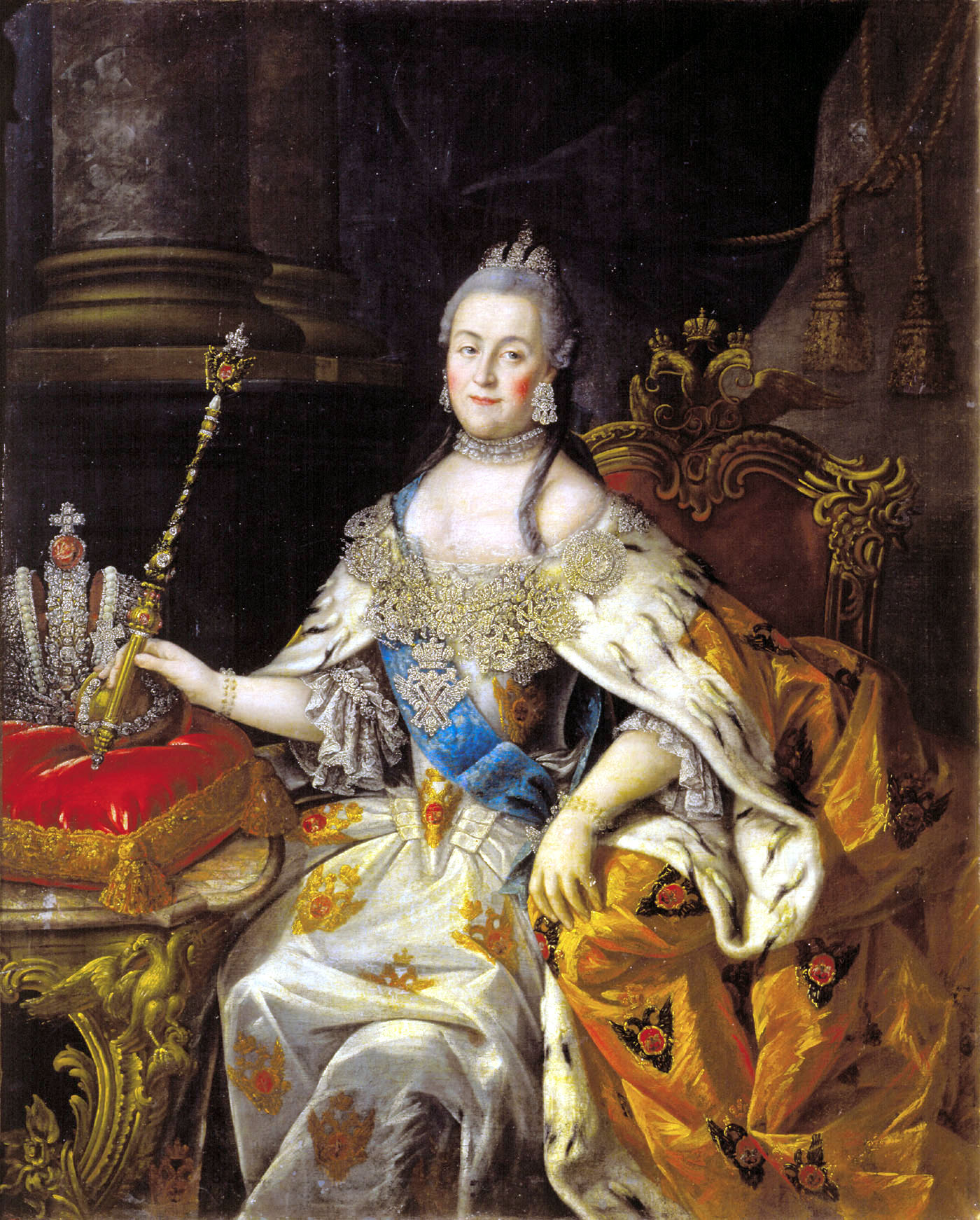
Catherine II, 1760s

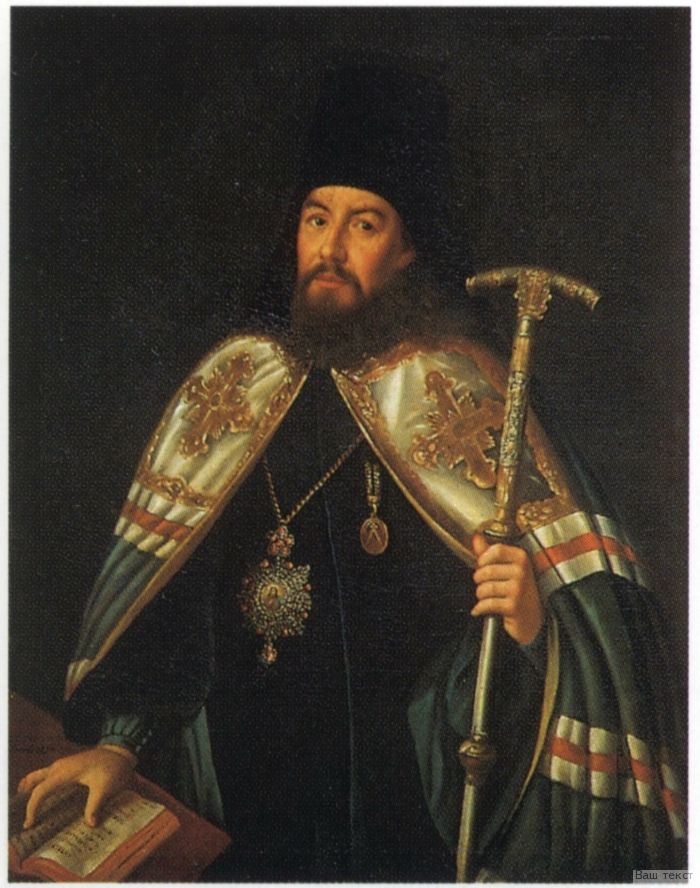
Archbishop Gavriil, 1774

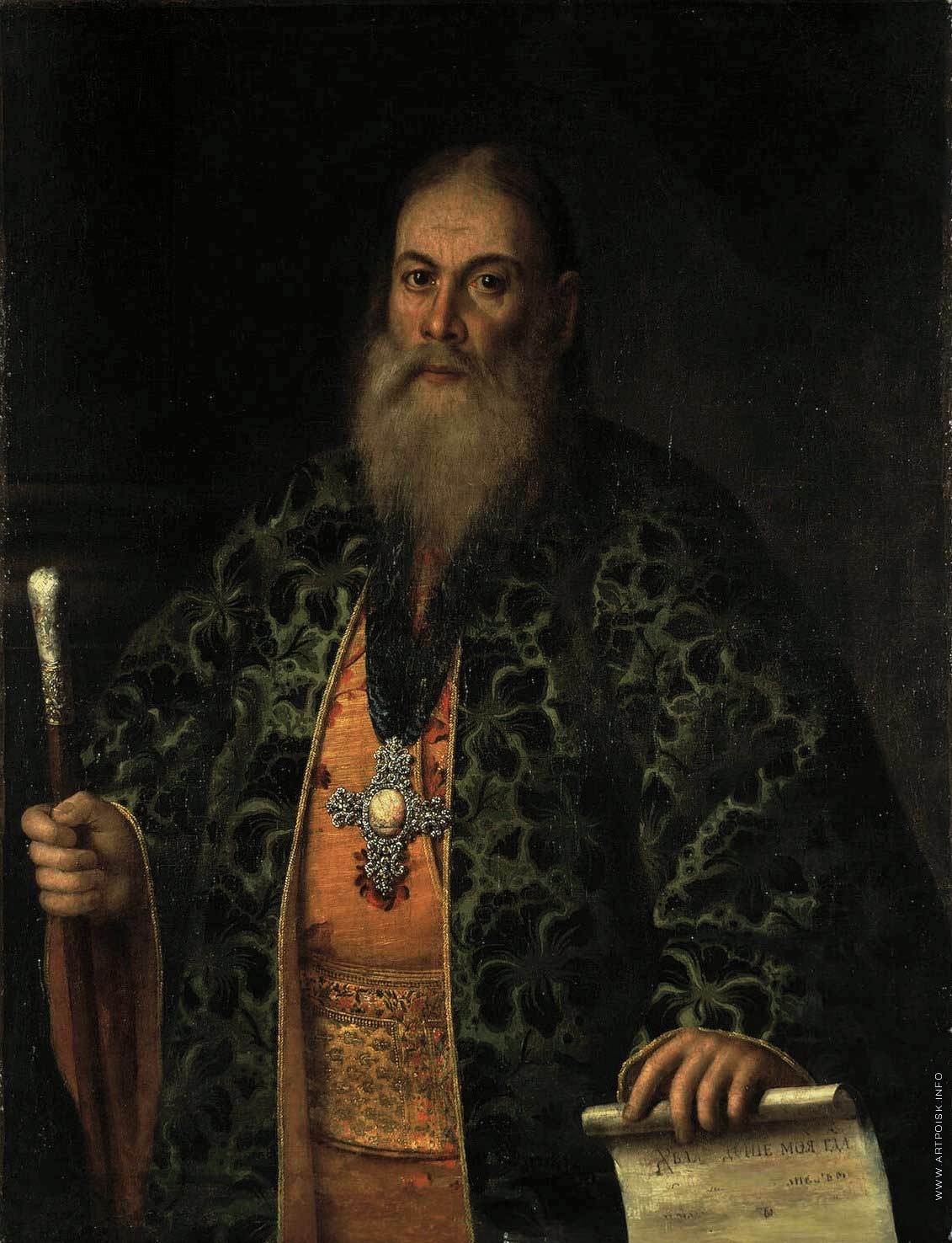
Father Fyodor Dubyansky, 1761

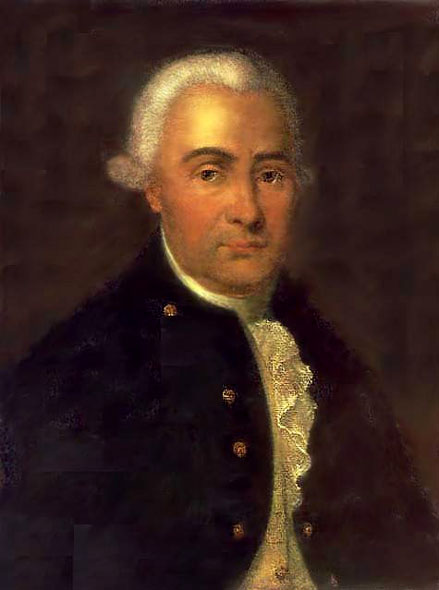
Self-portrait, 1784

== See also ==
- List of Russian artists

== Sources ==
- Yamshchikov, S.V. (1976). Русский портрет XVIII—XIX веков в музеях РСФСР (Russkii portret XVIII—XIX vekov v muzeiah RSFSR) [Russian portrait of the 18th–19th centuries in the RSFSR museums] (in Russian). Moscow: Izobrazitel'noe iskusstvo (Изобразительное искусство).
- Pelevin Yu A. Alexei Petrovich Antropov (in Russian)
- Biography (in Russian)
