= Alexei Ivanovich Belsky =

Russian painter (1726–1796)

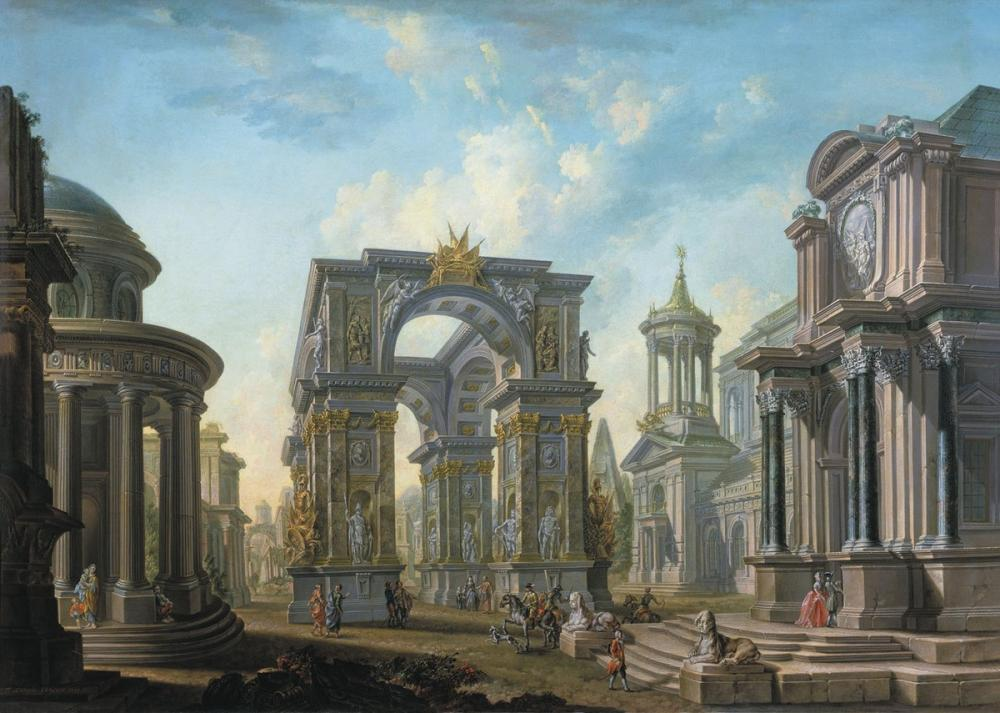
Architectural Landscape (1789)

Alexei Ivanovich Belsky (Russian: Алексе́й Ива́нович Бе́льский; 1726, Saint Petersburg - 21 May 1796, Saint Petersburg) was a Russian painter. He was part of the "Belsky Dynasty" of painters of the Eighteenth Century and a teacher at the Imperial Academy of Arts. He specialized in landscapes, allegories and historical subjects.

== Biography ==
In the mid 1740s, he and his brother Ivan Ivanovich were enrolled at the "Канцелярия от строений" (Chancellory of Buildings), where they studied with Ivan Vishnyakov, among others. He painted murals, fresco panels and theatrical scenery for several Imperial Palaces, as well as icons for St Andrew's Church, Kiev. In 1762, together with Ivan, he provided some paintings for the "Triumphal Arch", celebrating the coronation of Catherine the Great.

In 1764, he was elected to the Academy. In 1771, a series of didactic murals he executed for the Smolny Institute (one of the Institutes for Noble Maidens) resulted in an award of what was then the immense sum of 70 Rubles. The following year, he achieved the rank of Master Painter. In 1773, he was presented with a charter of liberty from the Academy, granting him and his progeny freedom from the poll-tax, conscription, enserfment and other possible obligations.

== Four of the didactic murals ==
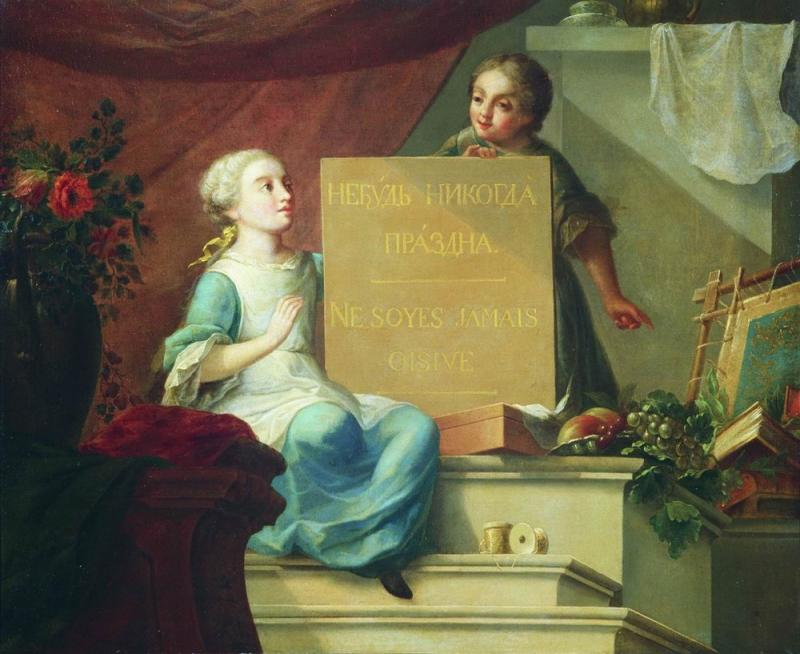
"Do not be a ne'er do well"

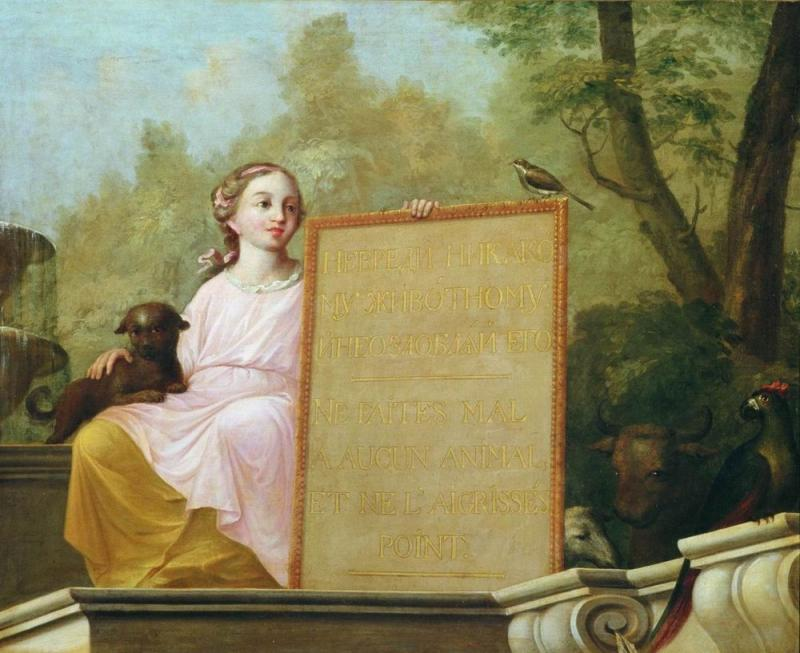
"Do not harm any animal"

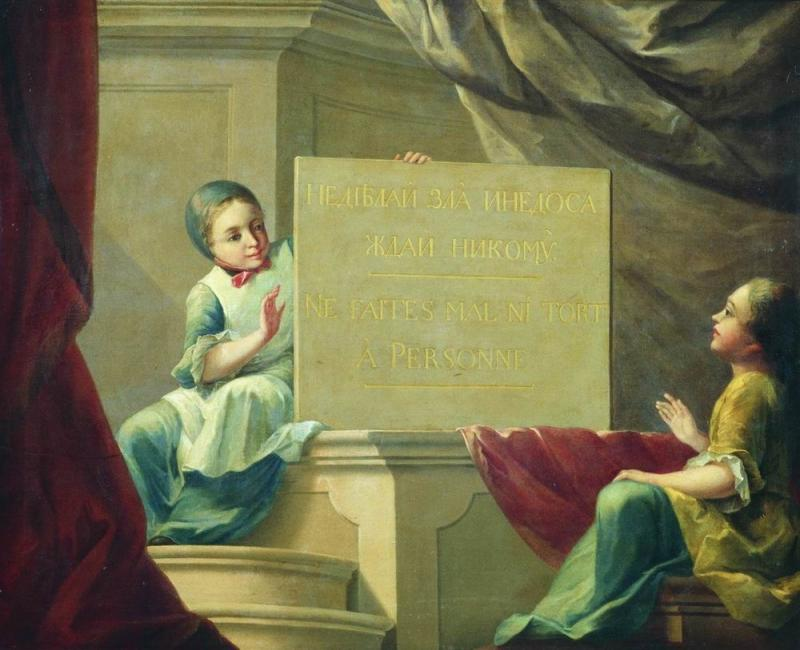
"Do not do evil and do not annoy anyone"

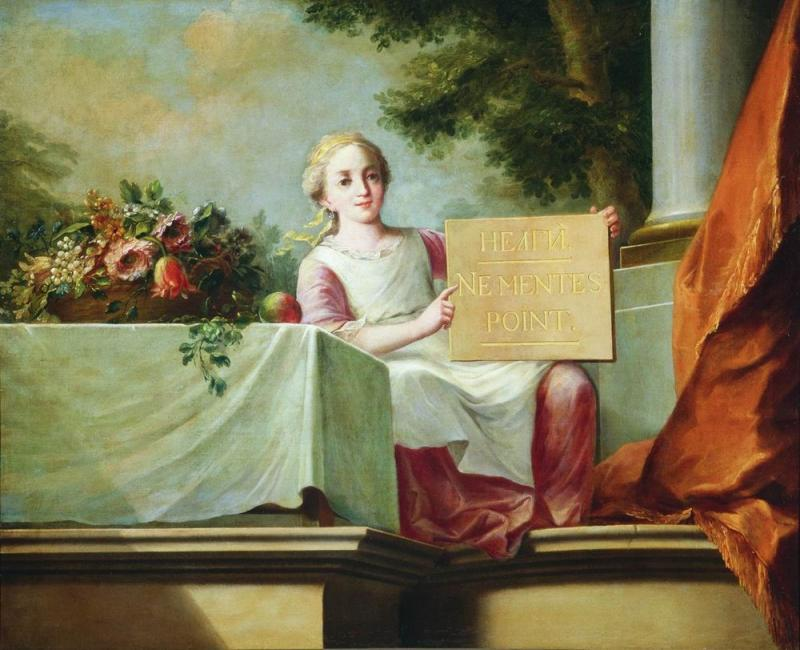
"Do not lie"
