= Ivan Ivanovich Belsky =

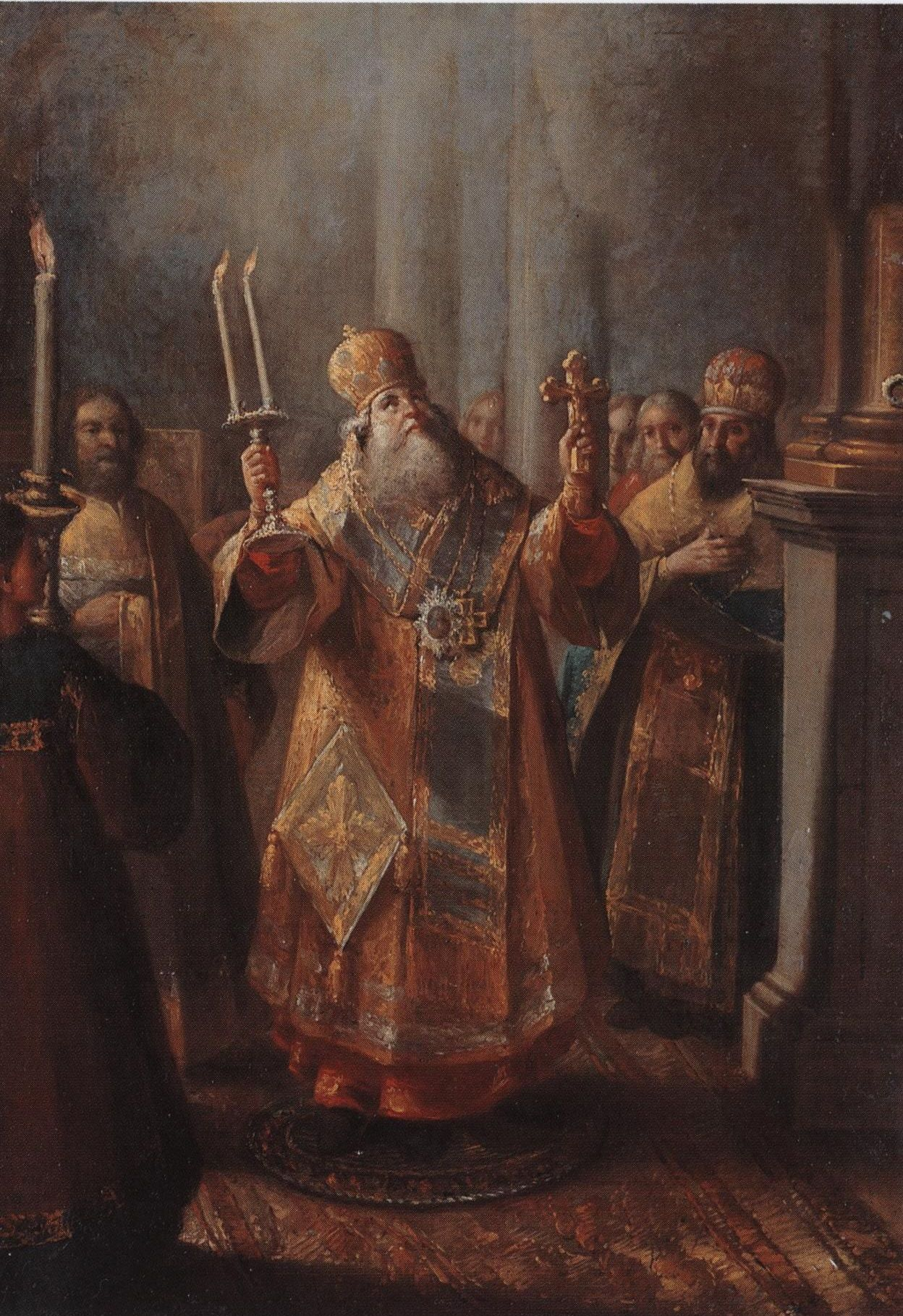
Bishop Presenting the Divine Liturgy (1770)

Ivan Ivanovich Belsky (Russian: Ива́н Ива́нович Бе́льский. 6 January 1719, Saint Petersburg — 13 January 1799, Saint Petersburg) was a Russian painter. He was part of the "Belsky Dynasty" of painters of the Eighteenth Century and one of the first teachers at the Imperial Academy of Arts, where he taught history painting.

== Biography ==
In 1740, together with his brother Alexei Ivanovich, he was enrolled at the "Канцелярия от строений" (Chancellory of Buildings), where he studied under Ivan Vishnyakov and others. While there, he participated in drawing up plans for the cathedral of the Alexander Nevsky Monastery.

He worked on the interior design of many Royal residences, especially the Peterhof Palace. Furthermore, in 1755 he painted imitations of amber in the construction of the famous Amber Room in the Catherine Palace of Tsarskoye Selo. In 1769, he became a full member of the Academy. He subsequently became the supervisor of Mikhail Lomonosov's mosaic workshop and painted icons for the Grand Church of the Winter Palace.

His free-standing art works are few. The best known are "Архиерей во время служения литургии" (Bishop Presenting the Divine Liturgy, 1770), and "Голова апостола Петра" (Head of the Apostle Peter, 1783), both in the Tretyakov Gallery. His son, Mikhail Ivanovich Belsky, also became a painter.
