= Ivan Vishnyakov =

Russian painter

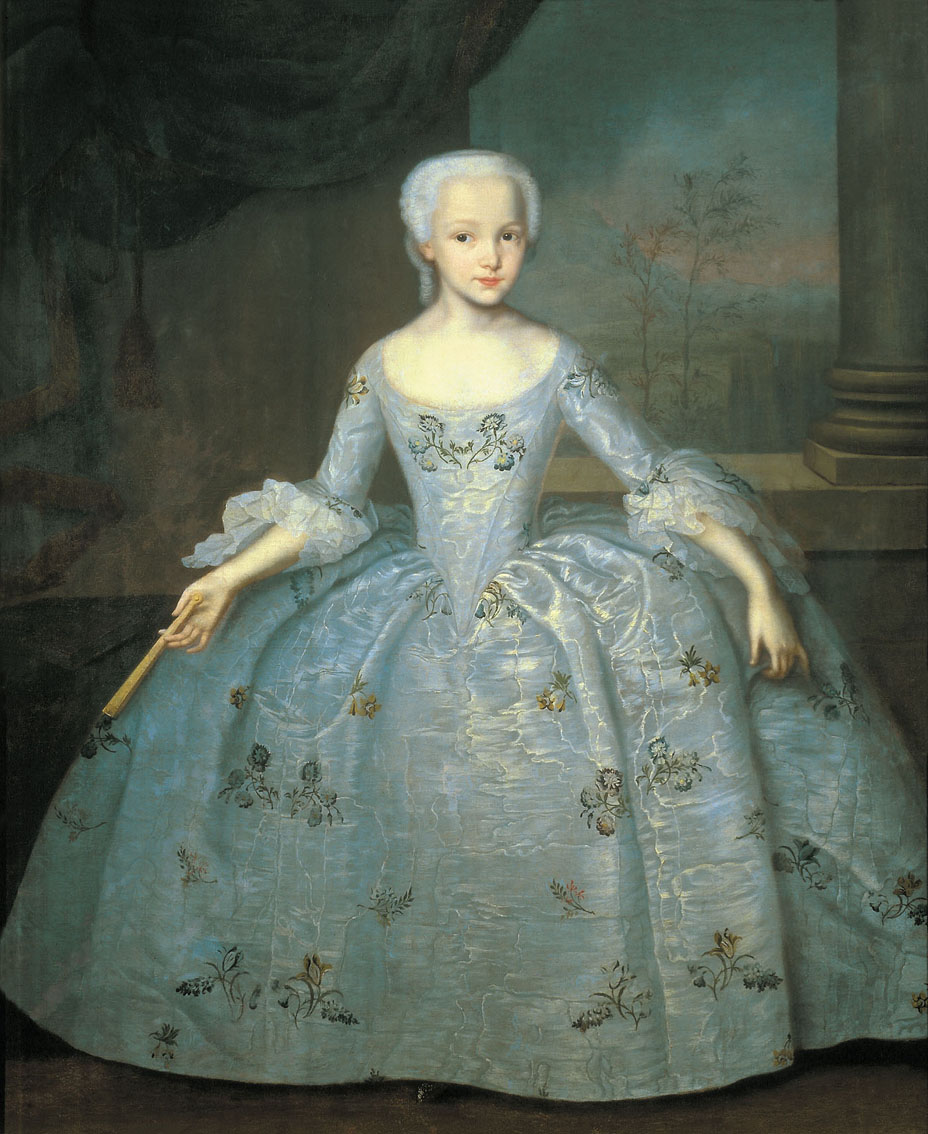
Sarah Eleanore Fermor (c. 1749)

Ivan Yakovlevich Vishnyakov (Russian: Ива́н Я́ковлевич Вишняко́в; 1699, in Moscow – 1761, in Saint Petersburg) was a Russian portrait painter and muralist in the Rococo style.

== Life and works ==
He was briefly apprenticed to be a varnisher, then was sent to the "Канцелярия от строений" (Chancellory of Buildings) in 1727, where he studied under Louis Caravaque, a French portrait painter living in Russia, and Andrey Matveyev. He qualified as a master painter in 1739 and became head of the Chancellory after Matveyev's early death.

He painted murals in many of the palaces and churches of Saint Petersburg and its suburbs, including the Summer Palace, the Anichkov Palace and the Winter Palace. He also did portraits and icons, restored paintings and appraised the works of foreign artists. His portraits were among the first to depart from the flat, static style favored at the Imperial Court. Among his best-known students were Alexei Antropov, Alexei Ivanovich Belsky and Ivan Firsov.

In 1740 he attained the rank of Court Counselor (a civil ranking equal to lieutenant-colonel) and in 1752 became a Collegiate Assessor.

== Gallery ==
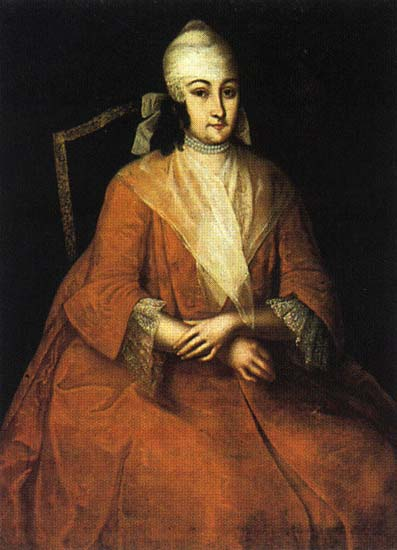
Grand Duchess Anna Leopoldovna (c. 1740)

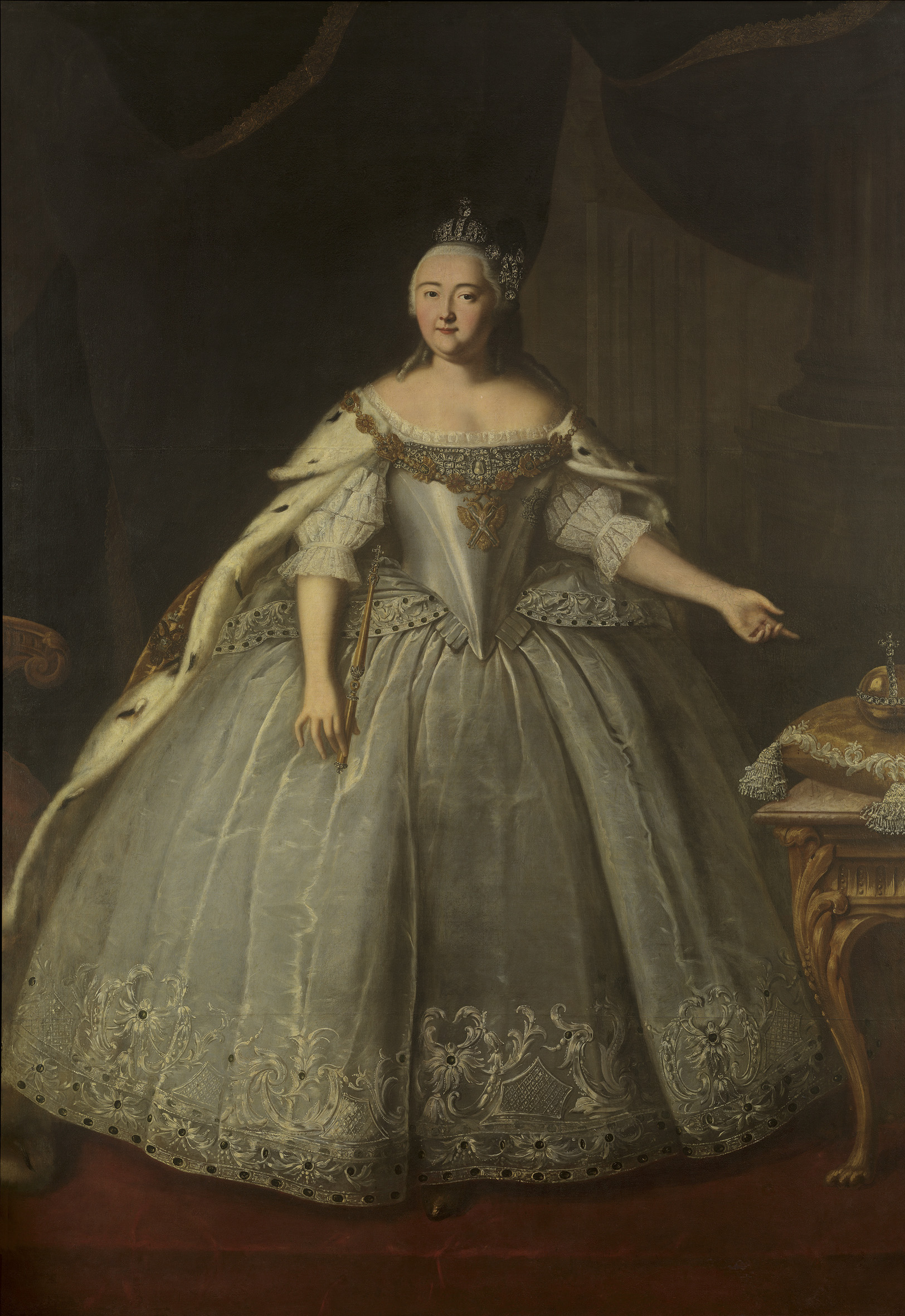
Empress Elizaveta Petrovna (1743)

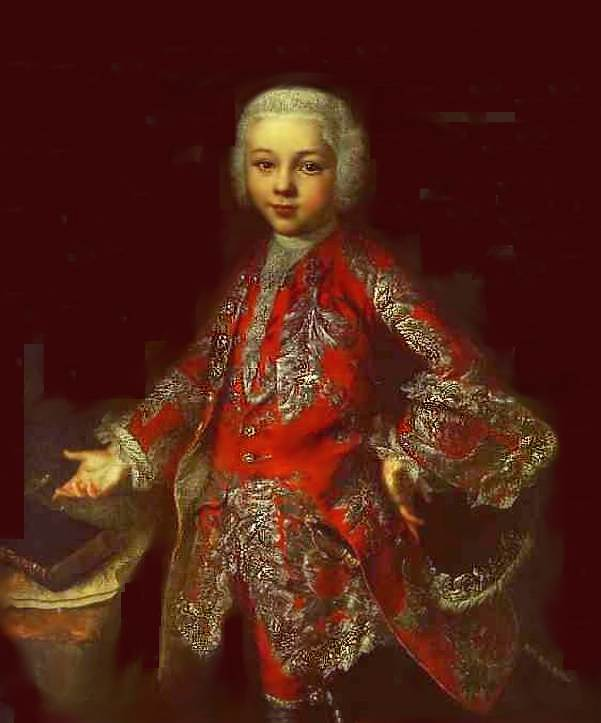
Vasily Daragan (1745)

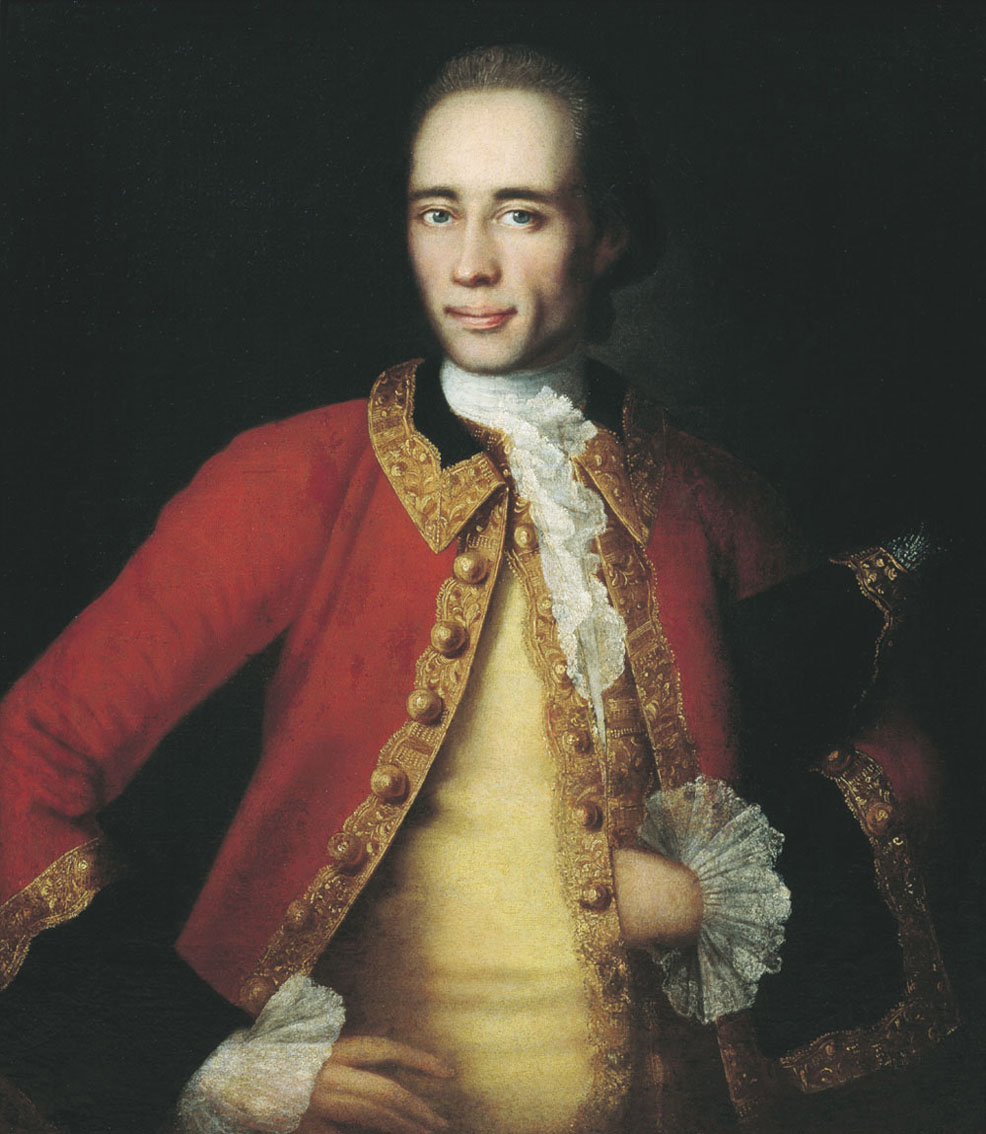
Matvey Semyonovich Begichev (1757)
