= Ilya Repin =

Ukrainian-born Russian painter (1844–1930)

- Илья Репин
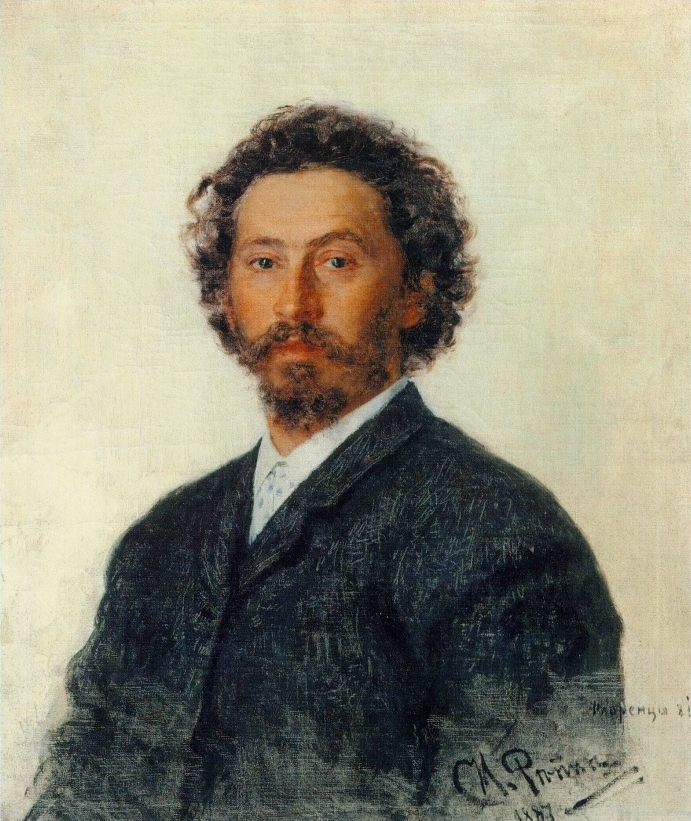
- Self-portrait, 1887
- Born: 5 August 1844; Chuguev, Russian Empire (now in Ukraine)
- Died: 29 September 1930 (aged 86); Kuokkala, Finland (now in Russia)
- Education: Imperial Academy of Arts (1871)
- Known for: Painting
- Notable work: Barge Haulers on the Volga (1870–1873); Religious Procession in Kursk Province (1880–1883); Ivan the Terrible and His Son Ivan (1883–1885); Reply of the Zaporozhian Cossacks (1880–1891)
- Movement: Realism, Peredvizhniki
- Spouse: Vera Shevtsova (m. 1872; div. 1887)
- Partner: Natalia Nordman (from 1900; died 1914)
- Children: 4
- Awards: Gold Medal of the Imperial Academy of Arts (1871); Legion of Honour (1901)
- Patrons: Pavel Tretyakov

Ilya Yefimovich Repin (Note: /iːljə ˈrɛpɪn/; also spelled Riepin or Rjepin; Russian: Илья Ефимович Репин, pronounced [ˈrʲepʲɪn], pre-reform spelling: Илья Ефимовичъ Рѣпинъ; Ukrainian: Ілля Юхимович Рєпін/Ріпин, romanized: Illia Yukhymovych Riepin/Ripyn; Finnish: Ilja Jefimovitš Repin.) (5 August [O.S. 24 July] 1844 – 29 September 1930) was a Ukrainian-born Russian painter. (Note: Attributed to the following sources:) (Note: Repin spoke both Russian and Ukrainian fluently, although he considered himself a Russian.) He became one of the most renowned artists in Russia in the 19th century. His major works include Barge Haulers on the Volga (1873), Religious Procession in Kursk Province (1880–1883), Ivan the Terrible and His Son Ivan (1885), and Reply of the Zaporozhian Cossacks (1880–1891). Repin is also known for the revealing portraits he made of the leading Russian literary and artistic figures of his time, including Mikhail Glinka, Modest Mussorgsky, Pavel Tretyakov, and especially Leo Tolstoy, with whom he had a long friendship.

Repin was born and brought up in Chuguev, then part of Russia. His father had served in an Uhlan regiment in the Russian army and then sold horses. Repin began painting icons at age sixteen. He failed at his first effort to enter the Imperial Academy of Arts in Saint Petersburg but went to the city anyway in 1863, audited courses, and won his first prizes in 1869 and 1871. In 1872, he presented his drawings at the academy after a tour along the Volga River. Grand Duke Vladimir Alexandrovich awarded him a commission for a large scale painting, The Barge Haulers of the Volga, which launched his career. Repin spent two years in Paris and Normandy, seeing the first Impressionist expositions and learning the techniques of painting in the open air.

Repin suffered one setback in 1885 when his history portrait of Ivan the Terrible killing his own son in a fit of rage caused a scandal, resulting in the painting being removed from exhibition. But this was followed by a series of major successes and new commissions. In 1898, with his second wife, he built a country house, which he called "The Penates" ('Penaty' in Russian) in Kuokkala, Viipuri Province, Finland, where they entertained Russian society. The house and garden now constitute the Penaty Memorial Estate, a museum and UNESCO World Heritage Site.

In 1905, following the repression of street demonstrations by the Imperial government, Repin quit his teaching position at the Academy of Arts. He welcomed the February Revolution in 1917 and had fluctuating opinions on the October Revolution. Later that year, Finland declared its independence from Russia. Following this event, he was unable to travel to Saint Petersburg (renamed Leningrad), even for an exhibition of his own works in 1925. Repin died in 1930 at the age of 86 and was buried at the Penates.

== Biography ==
=== Early life and work ===
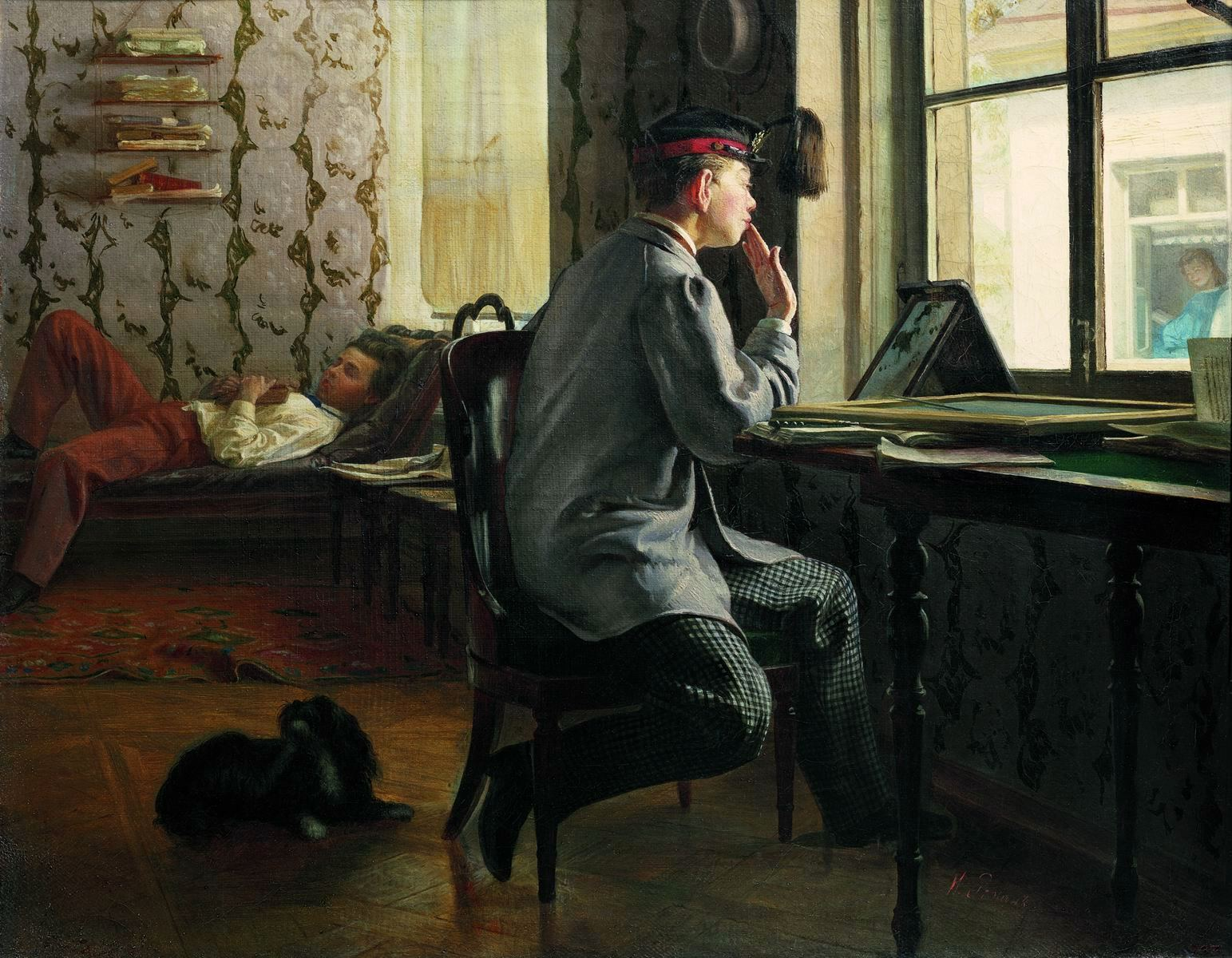
Students Studying for an Exam at the Academy of Arts, State Russian Museum (1864)

Ilya Yefimovich Repin was born on 5 August [O.S. 24 July] 1844 in Chuguev, a provincial town then part of Kharkov Governorate, Russian Empire, and now part of Ukraine. His father, Yefim Vasilyevich Repin (1804–1894), was a military settler who served in an Uhlan regiment of the Imperial Russian Army. He fought in the Russo-Persian War of 1826–1828, the Russo-Turkish War of 1828–1829, and the Hungarian campaign of 1849. When his father retired from the army in the early 1850s, after 27 years of service, he became an itinerant merchant selling horses. Although some sources referred to Repin as having Cossack or Ukrainian ancestry, he had none; instead, he identified as a Russian born in Little Russia – the name applied to Ukraine at the time. His ancestors were ethnic Russians who served in the streltsy and were sent to Chuguev to assist local Cossacks. Despite this, he felt affinity with both the Cossacks and Ukrainians.

Repin's mother, Tatyana Stepanovna Repina (née Bocharova; 1811–1880), was also the daughter of a soldier. She had family ties to noblemen and officers; the Repins had six children and were moderately well-off. He had two younger brothers: one who died at the age of ten, and another named Vasily.

In 1855, at the age of eleven, he was enrolled at the local school where his mother taught. He showed a talent for drawing and painting, and when he was thirteen, his father enrolled him in the workshop of Ivan Bunakov, an icon painter. He restored old icons and painted portraits of local notables. At the age of sixteen, his skill was recognized, and he became a member of an artel, or cooperative of artists, the Society for the Encouragement of Artists, which traveled around Voronezh province to paint icons and wall paintings.

Repin had much higher ambitions. In October 1863, he competed for admission to the Imperial Academy of Arts in the capital, Saint Petersburg. He failed in his first attempt, but persevered, rented a small room in the city, and took courses in academic drawing. In January 1864 he succeeded and was allowed, without fee, to attend classes. His brother Vasily also followed him to Saint Petersburg.

At the academy he met the painter Ivan Kramskoi, who became his professor and mentor. When Kramskoi founded the first independent union of Russian artists, Repin became a member. In 1869, he was awarded a gold medal second-class for his painting Job and His Brothers. He met the influential critic Vladimir Stasov and painted a portrait of Vera Shevtsova, his own future wife.

=== First success ===
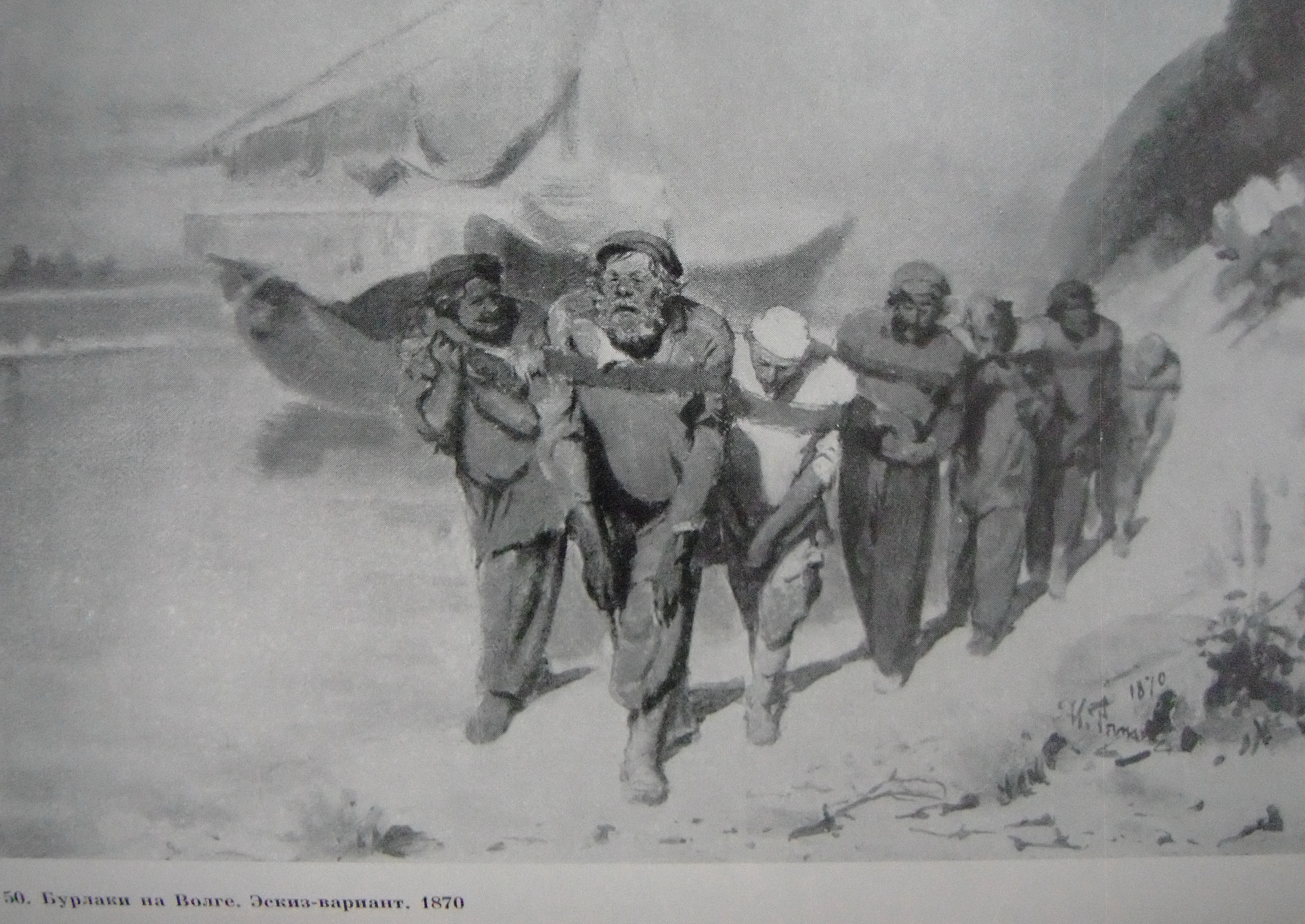
Early sketch for Barge Haulers on the Volga (1870)

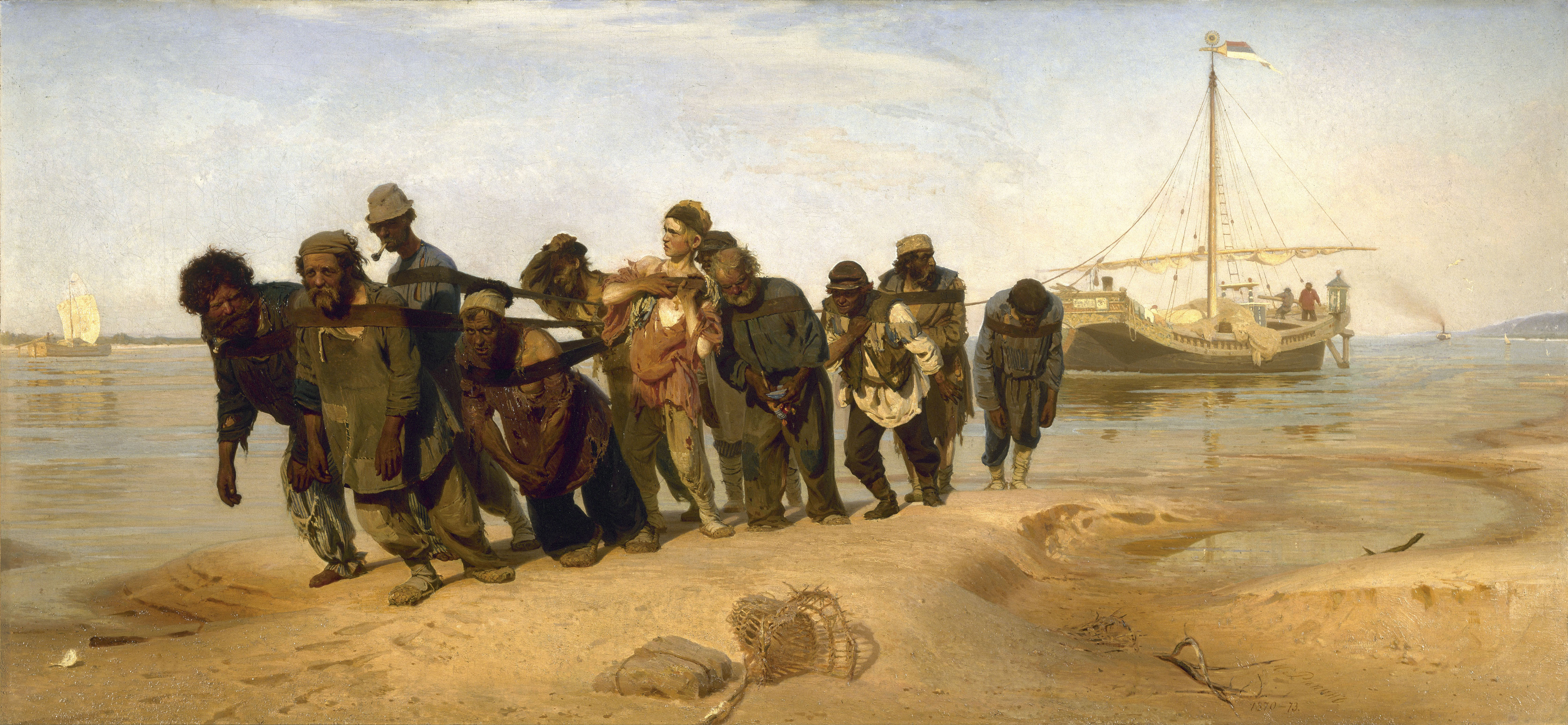
Barge Haulers on the Volga, Russian Museum, Saint Petersburg (1870–1873)

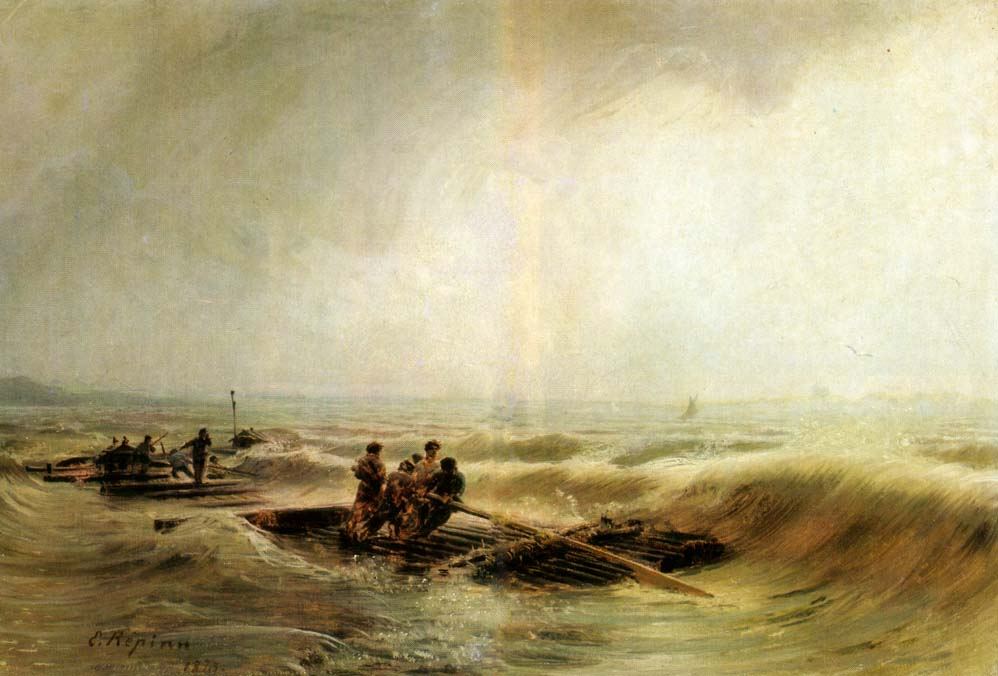
Early study, Storm on the Volga, State Russian Museum (1873)

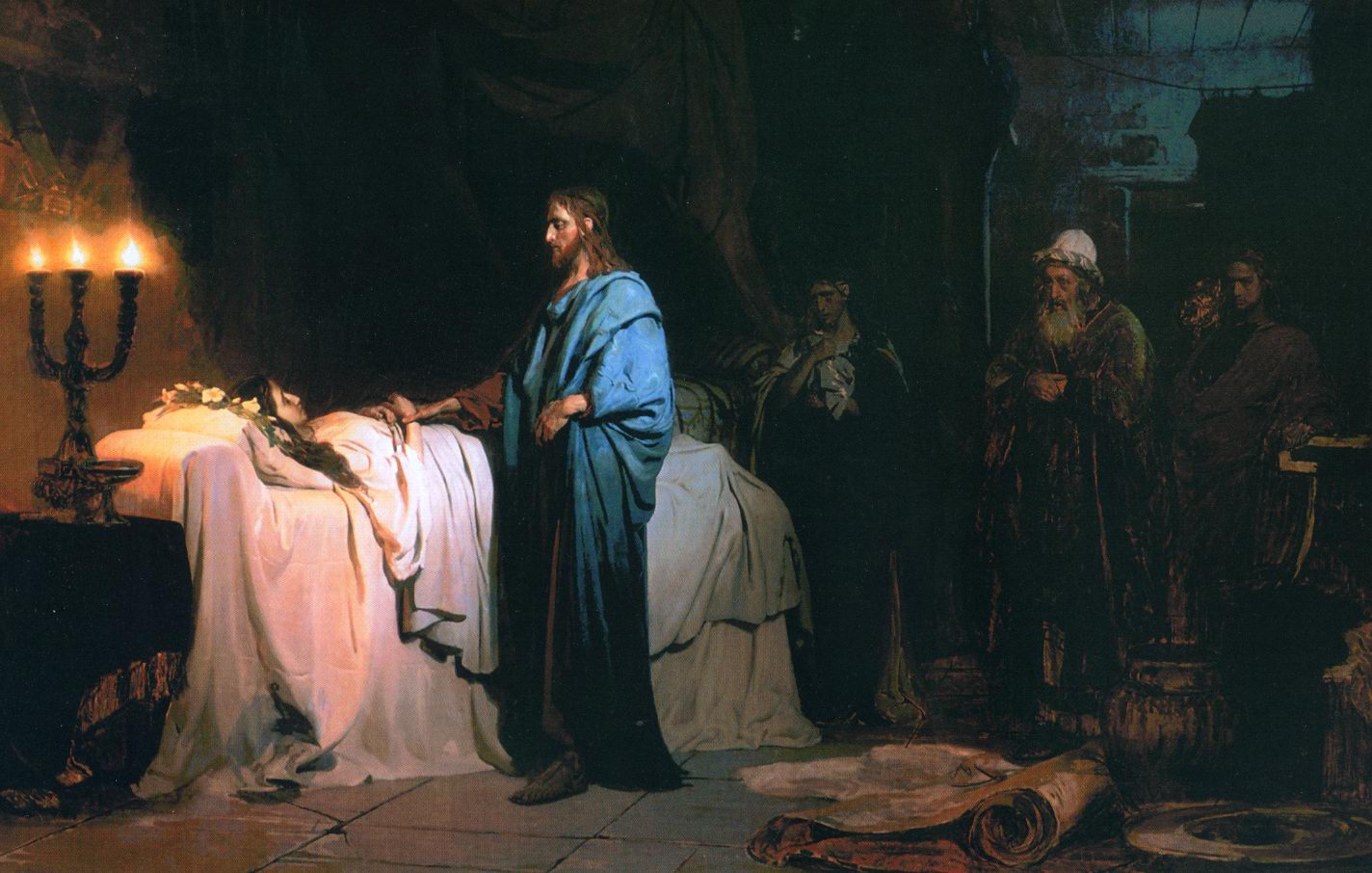
Resurrection of the Daughter of Jairus (1874)

In 1870, with two other artists, Repin traveled to the Volga River to sketch landscapes and studies of barge haulers (the Repin House in Tolyatti and the Repin Museum on the Volga commemorate this visit). When he returned to Saint Petersburg, the quality of his Volga boatmen drawings won him a commission from Grand Duke Vladimir Alexandrovich for a large scale painting on the subject. The painting, Barge Haulers on the Volga was completed in 1873. The following year, he was awarded a gold medal first-class for his painting The Resurrection of the Daughter of Jairus.

In May 1872, he married Vera Alexeievna Shevtsova (1855–1917). She joined him on his travels, including a trip to Samara, where their first child, Vera, was born. They had three other children; Nadia, Yuri, and Tatyana. The marriage was difficult, as Repin had numerous affairs, while Vera cared for the children. They were married for fifteen years.

In an 1872 letter to Stasov, Repin wrote: "Now it is the peasant who is the judge and so it is necessary to represent his interests. (That is just the thing for me, since I am myself, as you know, a peasant, the son of a retired soldier who served twenty-seven hard years in Nicholas I's army.)" In 1873, Repin traveled to Italy and France with his family. His second daughter, Nadezhda, was born in 1874.

=== Paris and Normandy ===
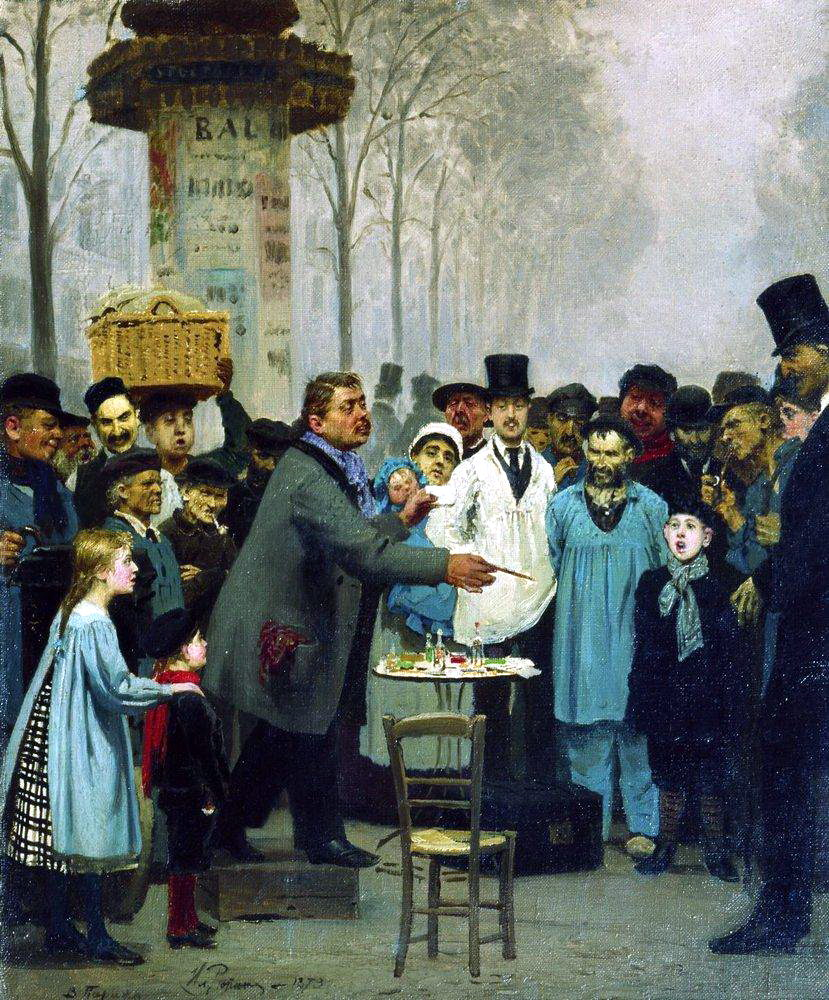
A Novelty Seller in Paris, Tretyakov Gallery (1873)

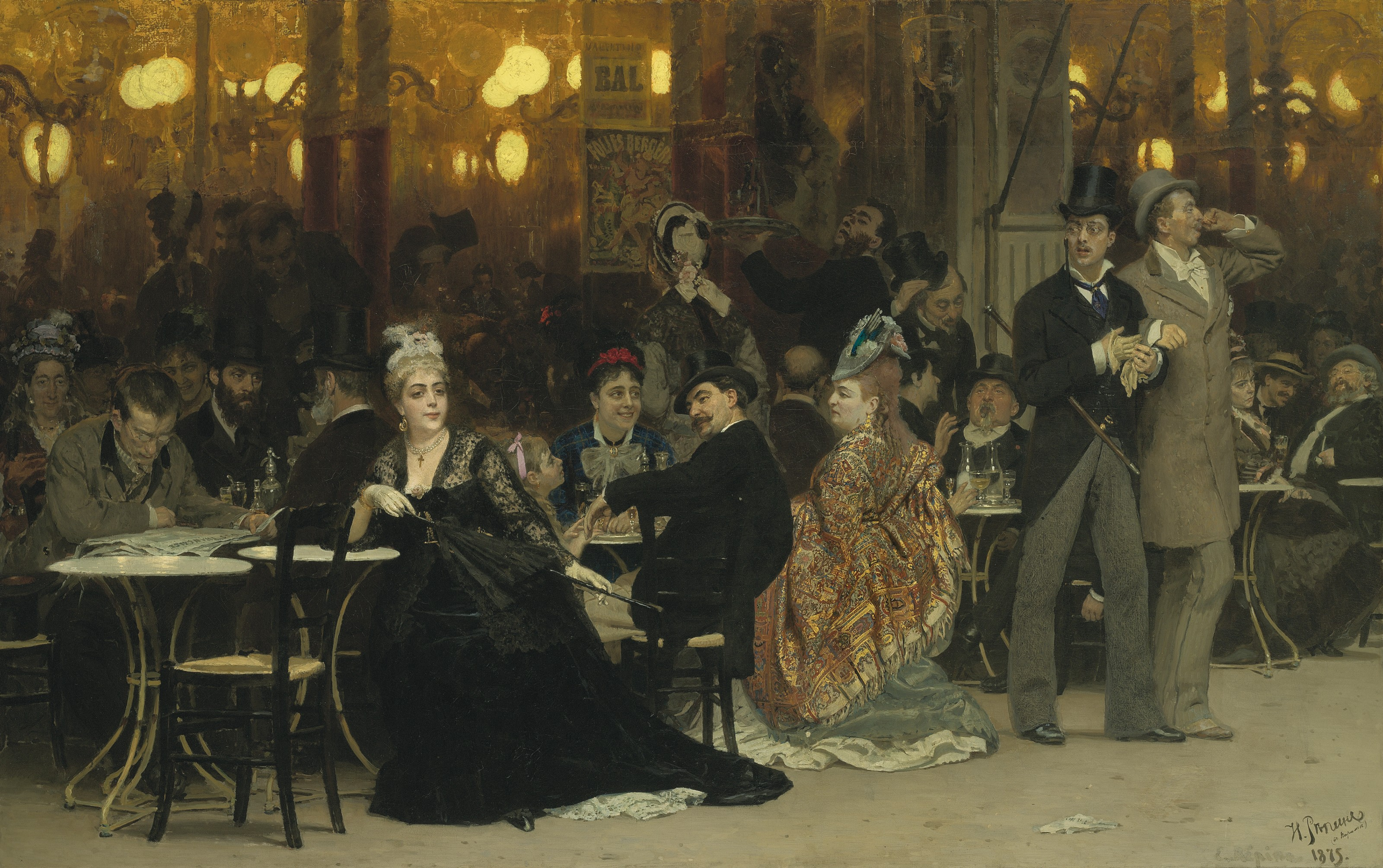
A Paris Cafe, Museum of Avant-Garde Mastery, Moscow (1875)

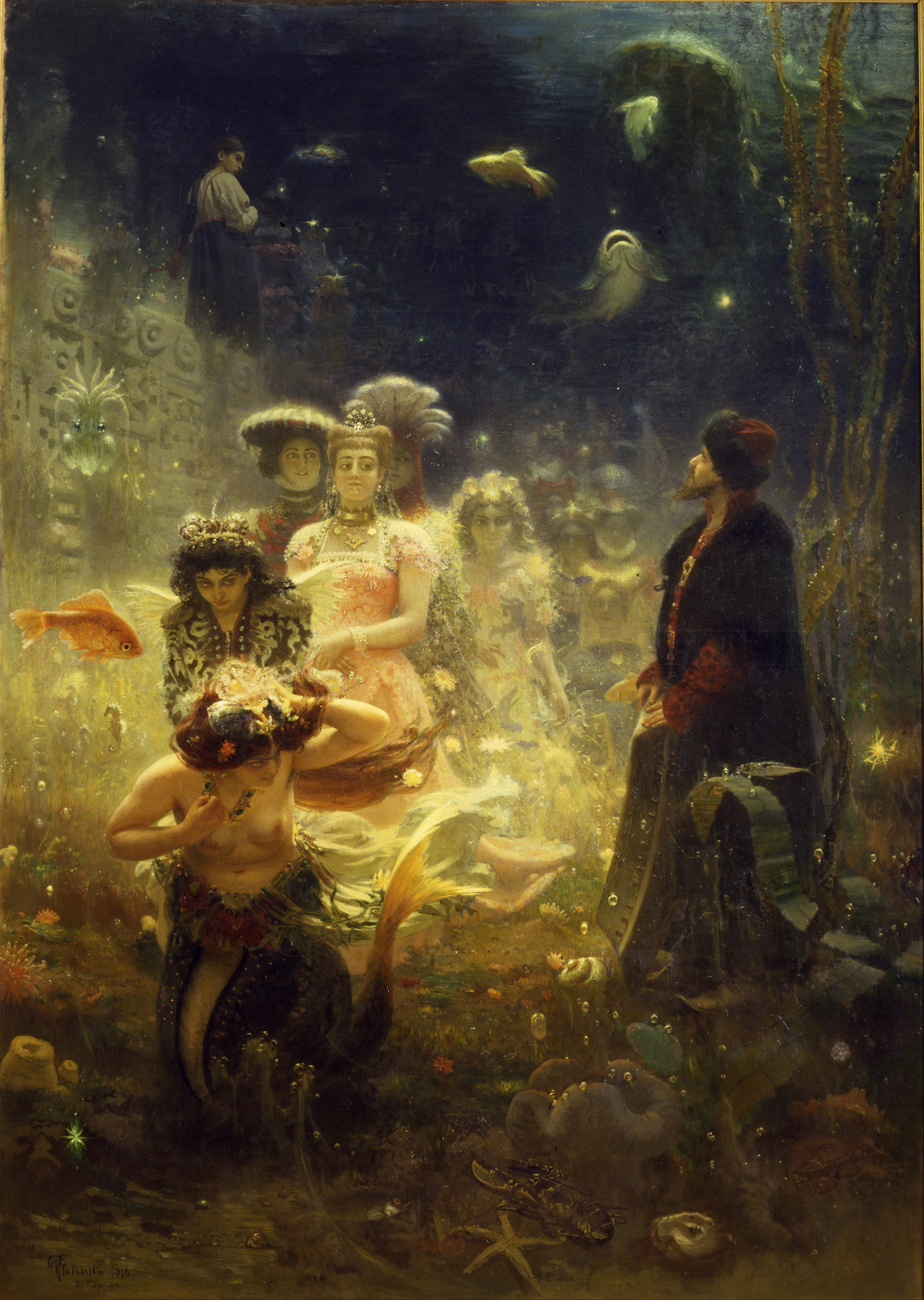
Sadko, Russian Museum, St. Petersburg (1876)

Repin's painting Barge Haulers of the Volga, shown at the Vienna International Exposition, brought him his first International attention. It also earned him a grant from the Academy of Fine Arts which allowed him to make an extended tour of several months to Austria, then Italy, and finally in 1873, to Paris. He rented an apartment in Montmartre at 13 rue Veron, and a small attic studio under a mansard roof at number 31 on the same street.

He remained in Paris for two years. He described his subjects as "the principal types of Parisians, in the most typical settings." He painted the street markets and boulevards of Paris, and especially the varied faces and costumes of the Parisians of every class. His major Russian work created in Paris was Sadko (1876), a mystical allegory of an undersea kingdom, which included elements of Art Nouveau. He gave the young heroine a Russian face, surrounded by a strange and exotic setting. He wrote to his friend the civic Stasov: "This idea describes my present situation, and perhaps, the situation of all of our Russian art". In 1876, his Sadko painting won him a place in the Russian Academy of Fine Arts.

He was in Paris in April 1874, when the First Impressionist Exhibition was held. In 1875, he wrote to Stasov about "The liberty of the "impressionalists", Manet, Monet et the others, and their infantile truthfulness." In 1876, he painted a portrait of his wife Vera in the exact style of Berthe Morisot's portrait by Édouard Manet. as a tribute to Manet and Morisot. Though he admired some impressionist techniques, especially their depictions of light and color, he felt their work lacked moral or social purpose, key factors in his own art.

Following the ideas of the Impressionists, he spent two months at Veules-les-Roses in Normandy, painting landscapes in the open air. In 1874–1876 he contributed to the Salon in Paris. In 1876, he wrote to the secretary of the Russian academy of arts: "You told me not to become "Francified." What are you saying? I dream only of returning to Russia and working seriously. But Paris was of great utility to me, it can't be denied."

=== Moscow and "The Wanderers" (1876–1885) ===
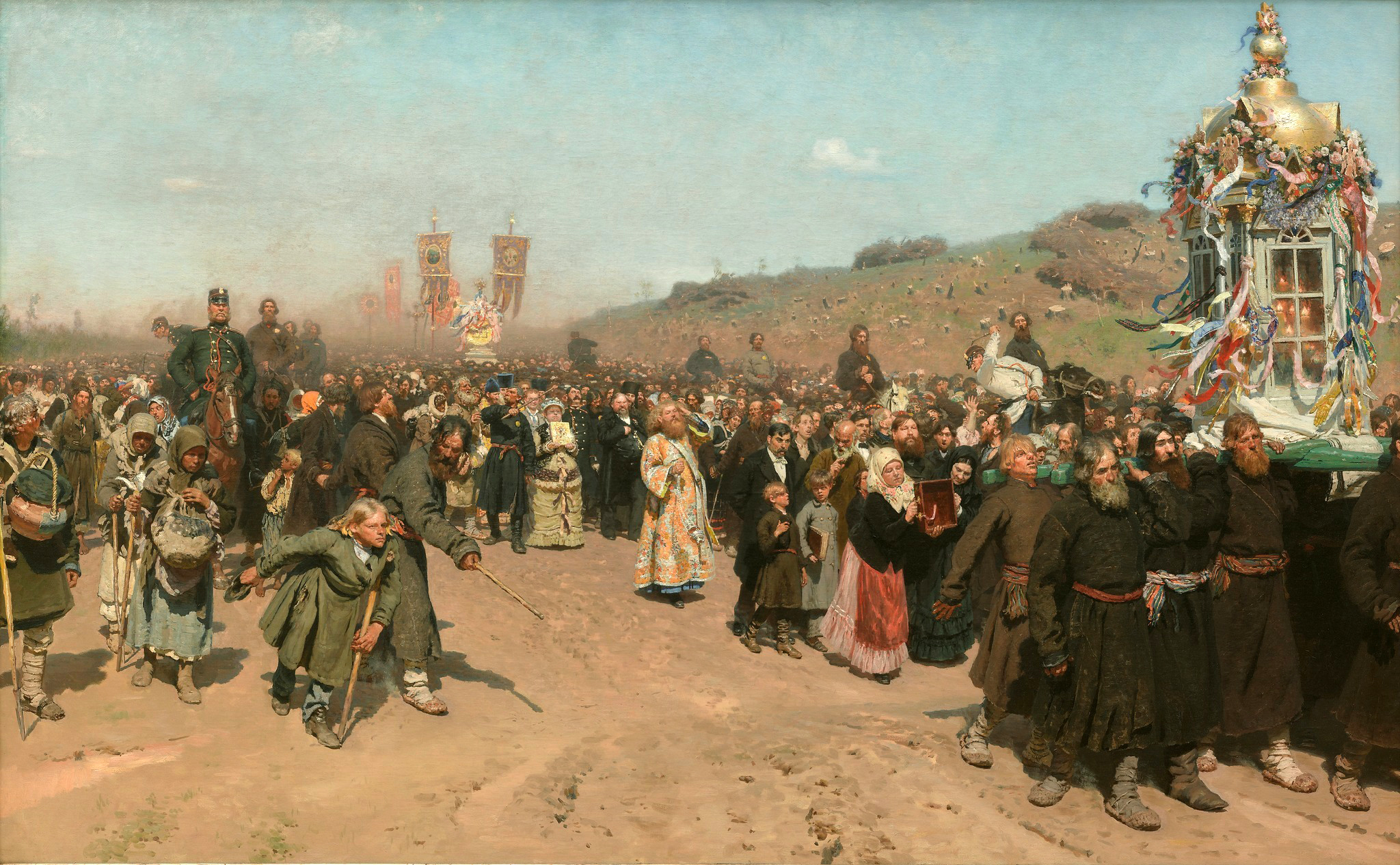
Religious Procession in Kursk Province (1880–1883; Tretyakov Gallery, Moscow)

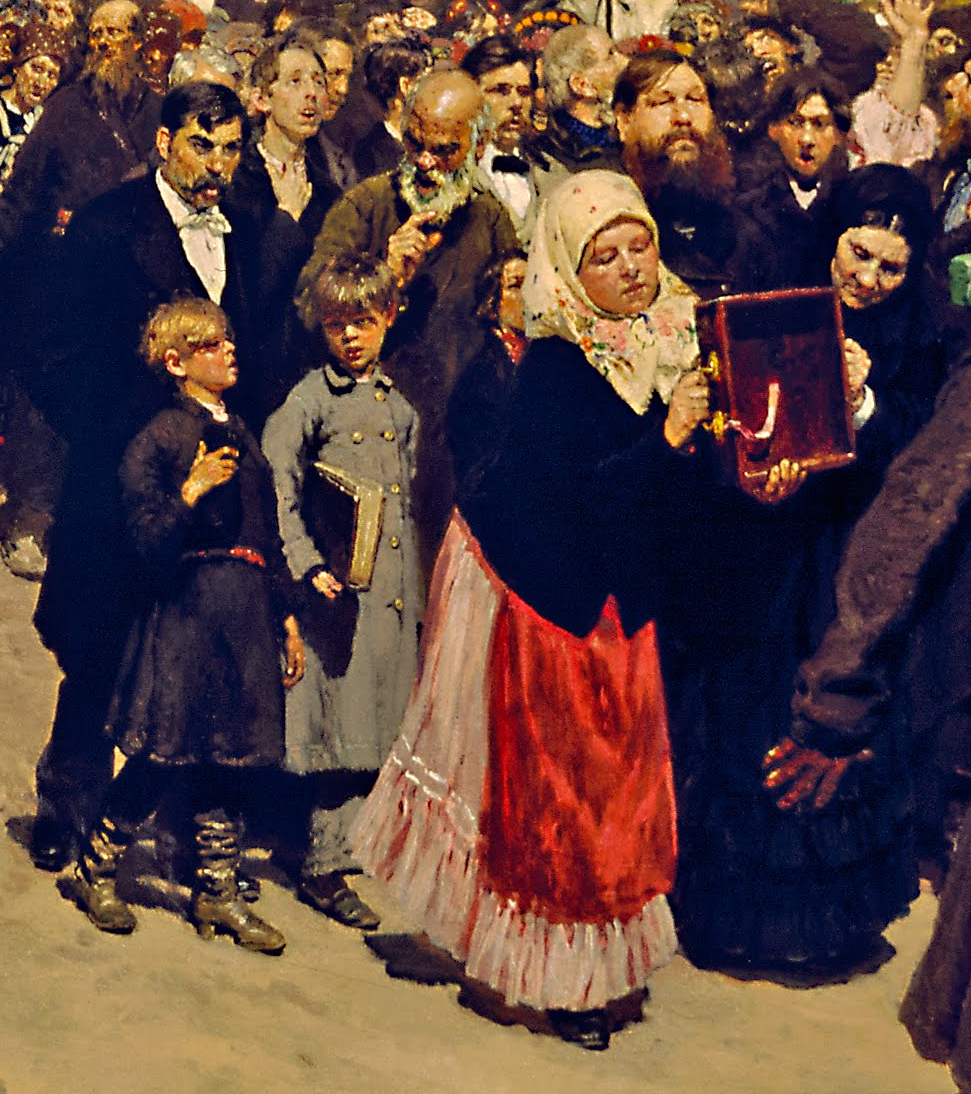
Detail of the Religious Procession in Kursk Province (1881–1883)

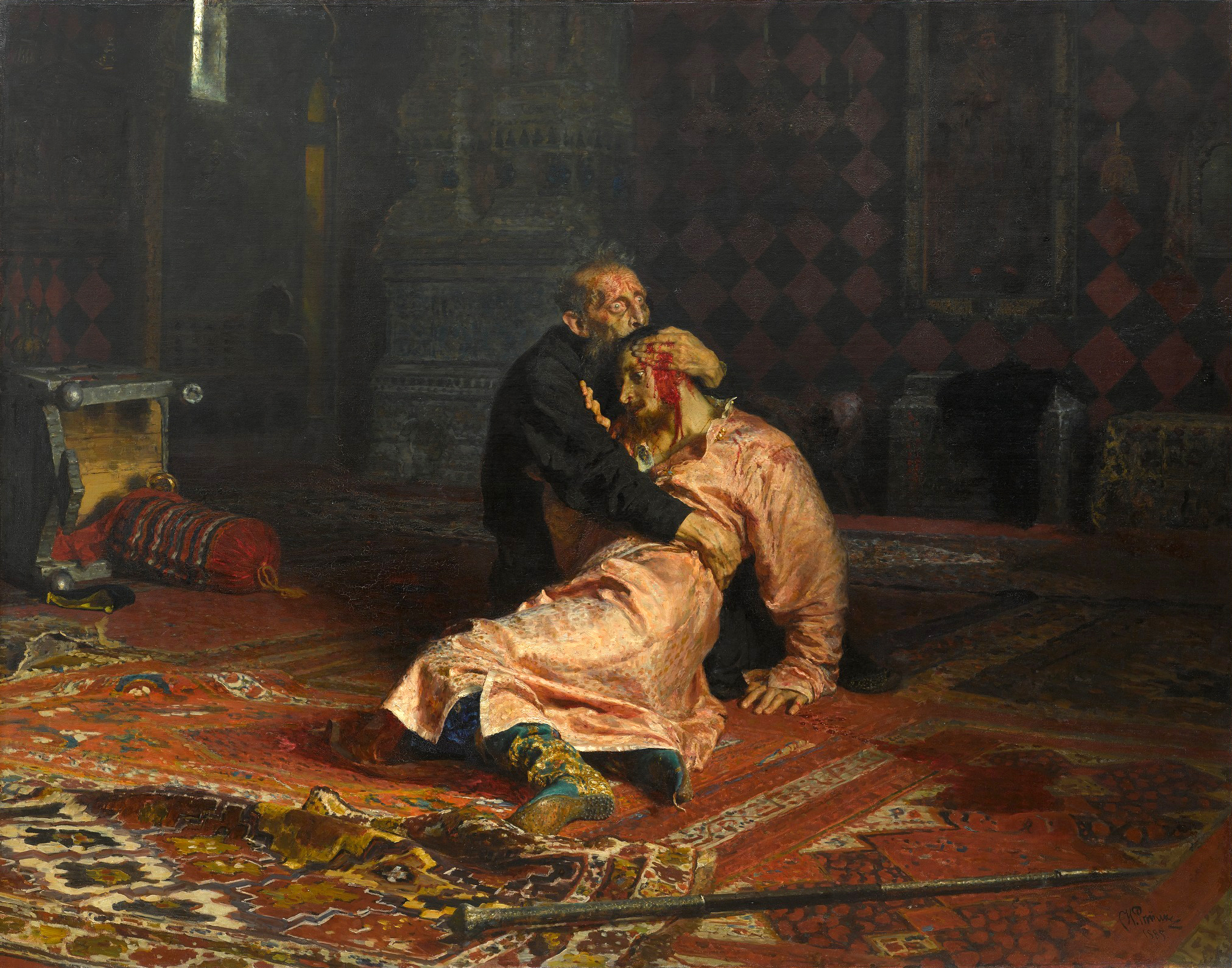
Ivan the Terrible and His Son Ivan, Tretyakov Gallery (1885)

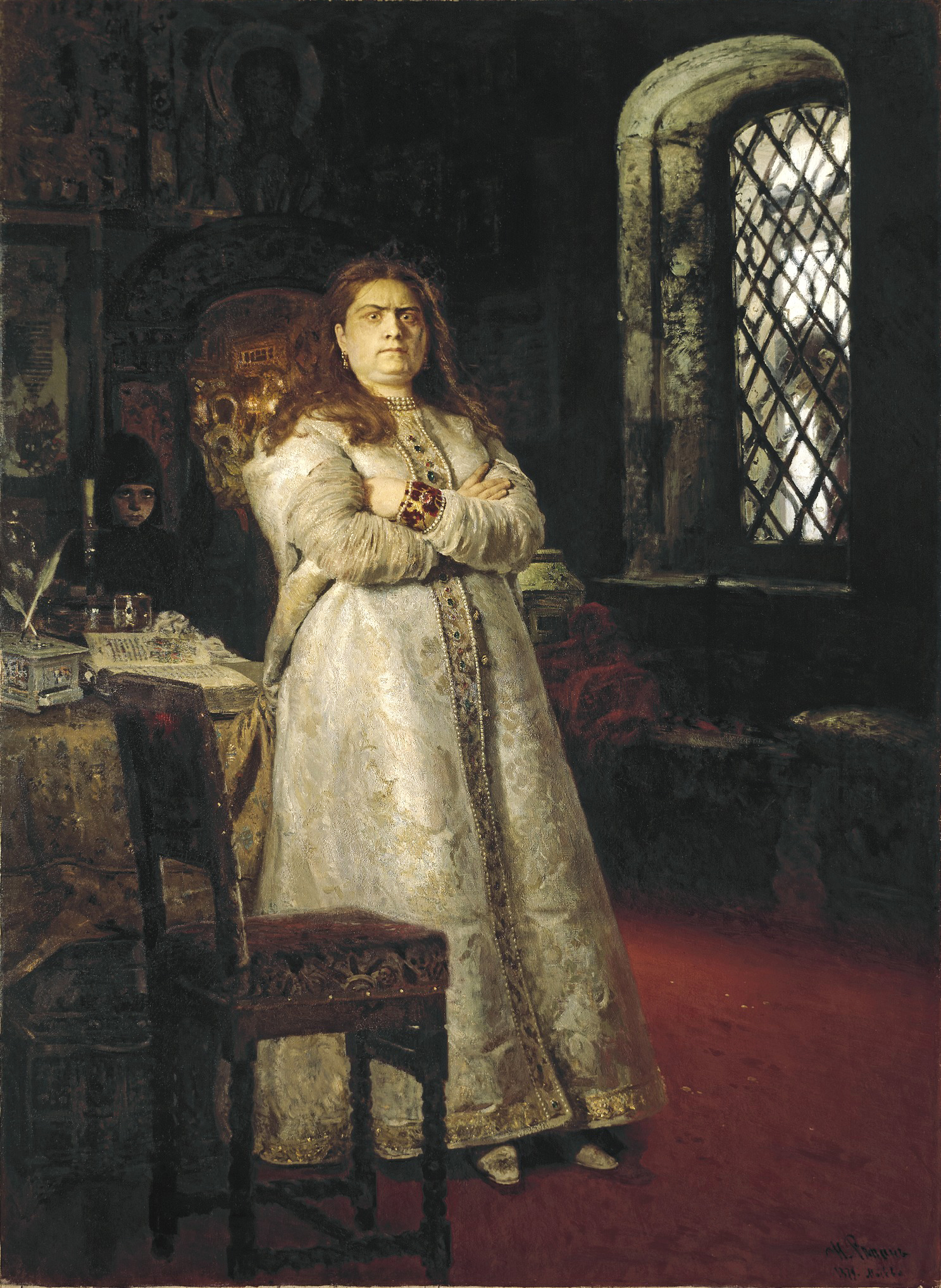
The Tsarevna Sophia Alekseyevna, Tretyakov Gallery (1879)

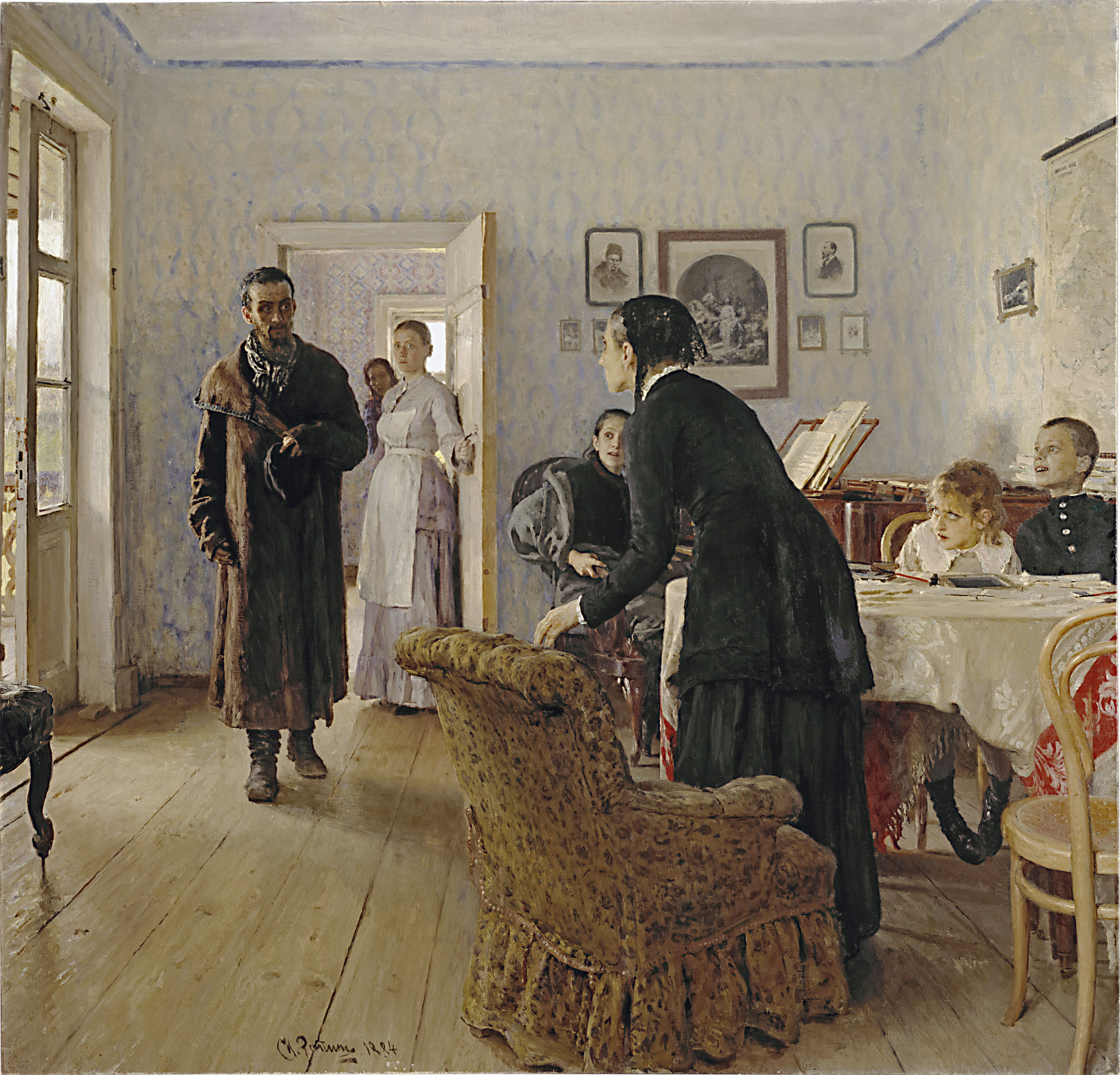
They Did Not Expect Him, Tretyakov Gallery (1884–1888)

Repin returned to Russia in 1876. His son Yury was born the following year. He moved to Moscow that year, and produced a wide variety of works including portraits of the painters Arkhip Kuindzhi and Ivan Shishkin. He became involved with the "Wanderers", an artistic movement founded in St. Petersburg in 1863. The style of the Wanderers was resolutely realistic, patriotic, and politically engaged, determined to break with classical models and to create a specifically Russian art. It involved not only painters, but sculptors, writers and composers.

Repin created a series of major historical works, including the Religious Procession in Kursk Governorate (1883), which was presented at the 12th annual exposition of the Wanderers. It was notable both for its extraordinary crowd of realistic figures, including surly policemen, weary monks, children and beggars, each expressing a vivid personality. He also experimented with outdoor sunlight effects, apparently influenced by the impressionists and his outdoor studies in France. His next major work of this period was Ivan the Terrible and His Son Ivan. This painting, depicting the tsar, his face full of horror, just after he has killed his son with his sceptre in a demented rage. It caused a scandal. Some critics saw it as a veiled criticism of Tsar Alexander III, who had brutally suppressed the opposition after a failed assassination attempt. It was also attacked by the more aesthetic faction of the Wanderers, who considered it overly sensationalist. It was vandalised twice and was finally, at the tsar's request, removed from view. The tsar reconsidered his decision, and the painting was finally put back on view.

The portrait of Tsarevna Sophia Alekseyevna is one of his most tragic historical works. It depicts the daughter of Tsar Alexis who became regent of Russia after the death of her father, but then was deposed from power in 1689 and locked away in a convent by her half-brother, Peter the Great. The painting captures her fury as she realises her future life.

They Did Not Expect Him (1884–1888) is a notable and subtle historical work of the period, depicting a young man, a former narodnik or revolutionary, emaciated and frail from prison and exile, returning unexpectedly to his family. The story is told by the different expressions on the faces of his family and small details, such as the portraits of Tsar Alexander III and of favourite Russian poets on the wall.

=== Repin and Tolstoy ===
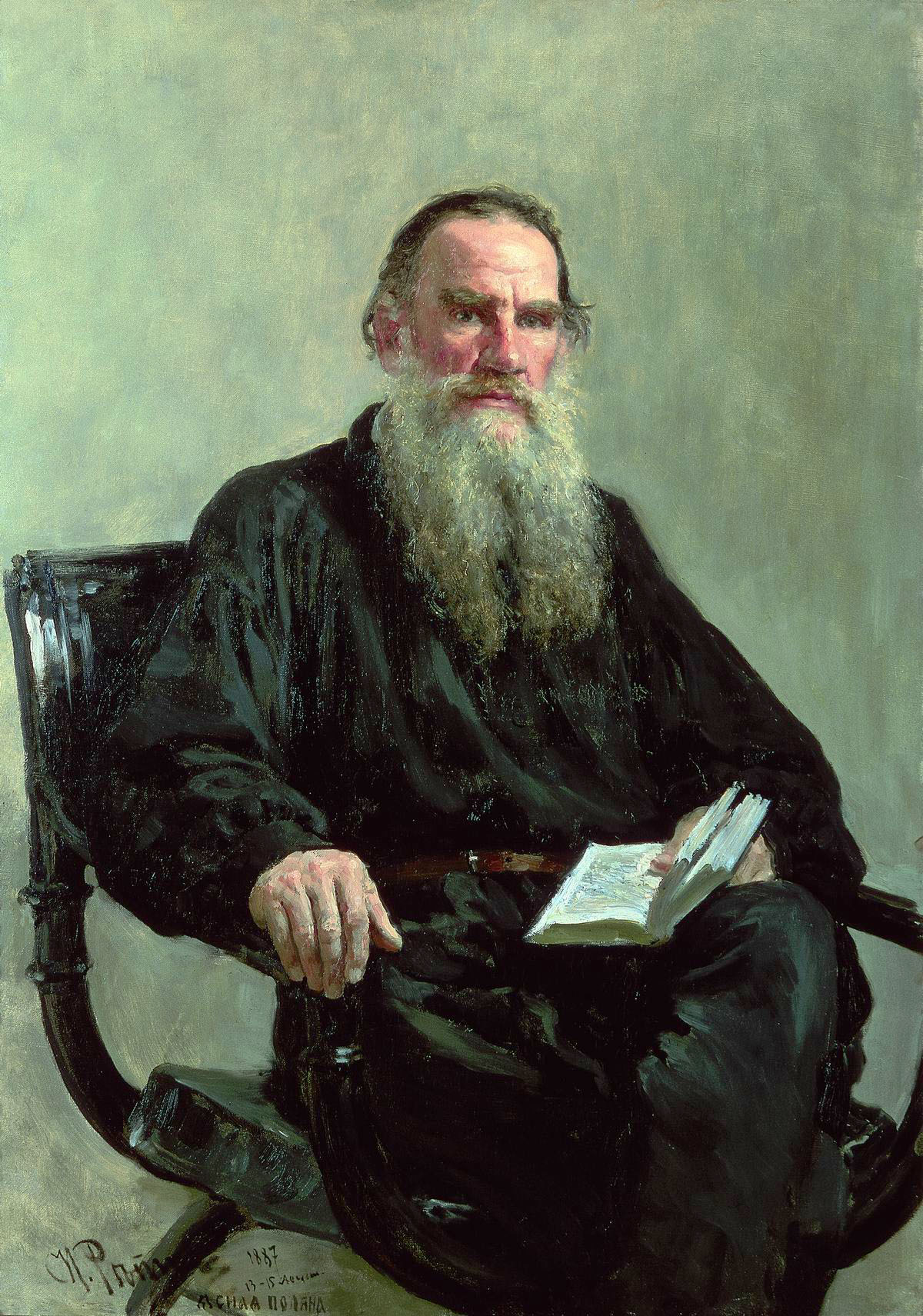
Portrait of Tolstoy (1887)

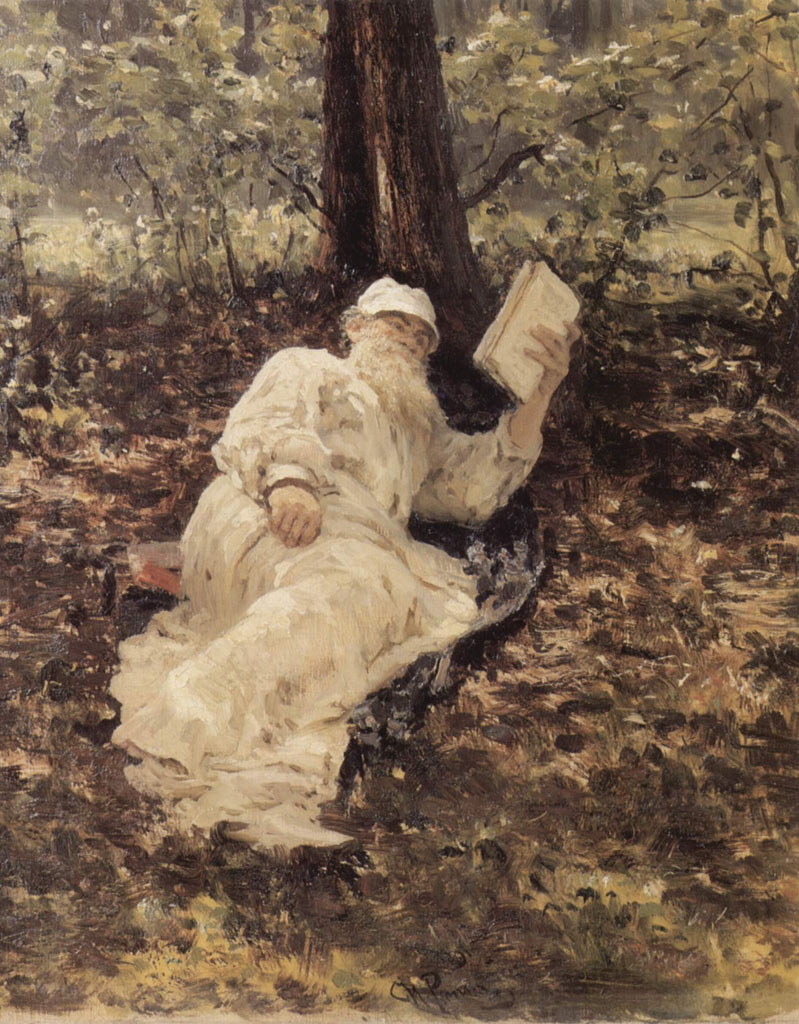
Tolstoy reading under a tree in the forest, Tretyakov Gallery Moscow (1891)

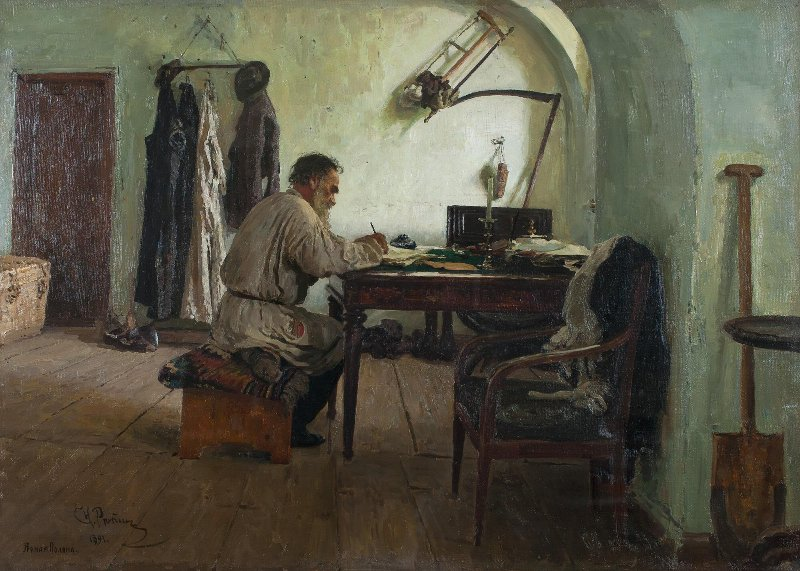
Tolstoy writing at Yasnaya Polyana, Pushkin House (1891)

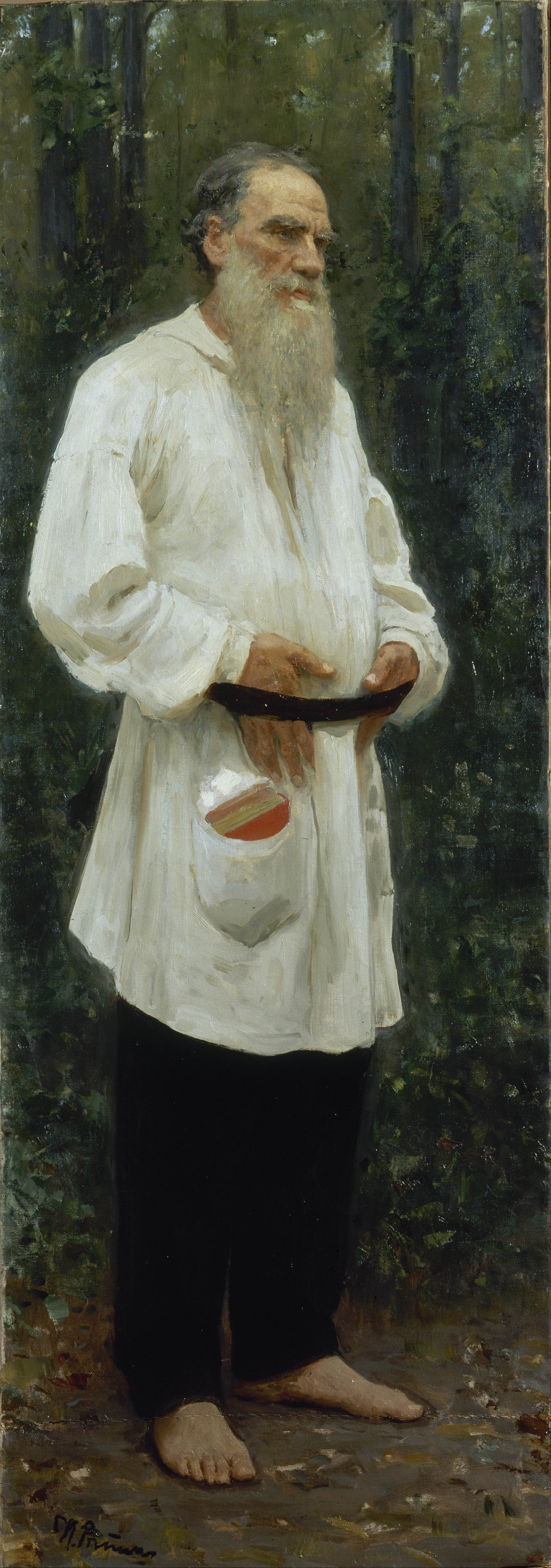
Tolstoy barefoot, State Russian Museum, St. Petersburg (1901)

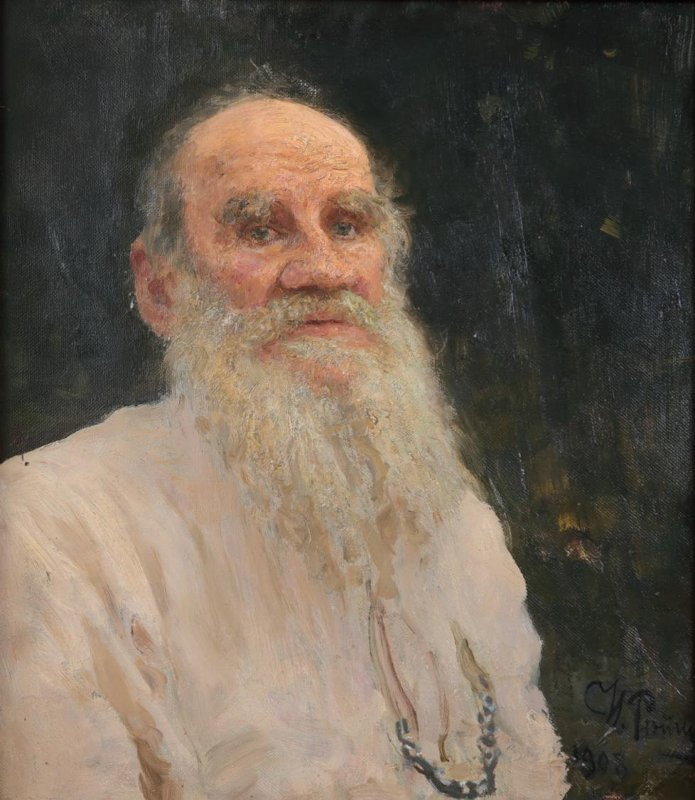
Portrait of Tolstoy shortly before his death (1908)

In 1880, Leo Tolstoy came to Repin's small studio on Bolshoi Trubny street in Moscow to introduce himself. This developed into a friendship between the 36-year-old painter and the 52-year-old writer that lasted thirty years until Tolstoy's death in 1910. Repin regularly visited Tolstoy at his Moscow residence, and his country estate at Yasnaya Polyana. He painted a series of portraits of Tolstoy in peasant dress, working and reading under a tree at Yasnaya Polyana. Tolstoy wrote of an 1887 visit by Repin: "Repin came to see me and painted a fine portrait. I appreciate him more and more; he is lively person, approaching the light to which all of us aspire, including us poor sinners." His last trip to see Tolstoy at Yasnaya Polyana was in 1907, when Tolstoy was 79. Despite his age, Tolstoy went horseback riding with Repin, ploughed fields, cleared paths of brush and hiked through the countryside for nine hours, all the while discussing philosophy and morals. Repin's portraits of Tolstoy in country dress were widely exhibited, and helped build Tolstoy's legendary image.

=== Repin and Russian composers ===
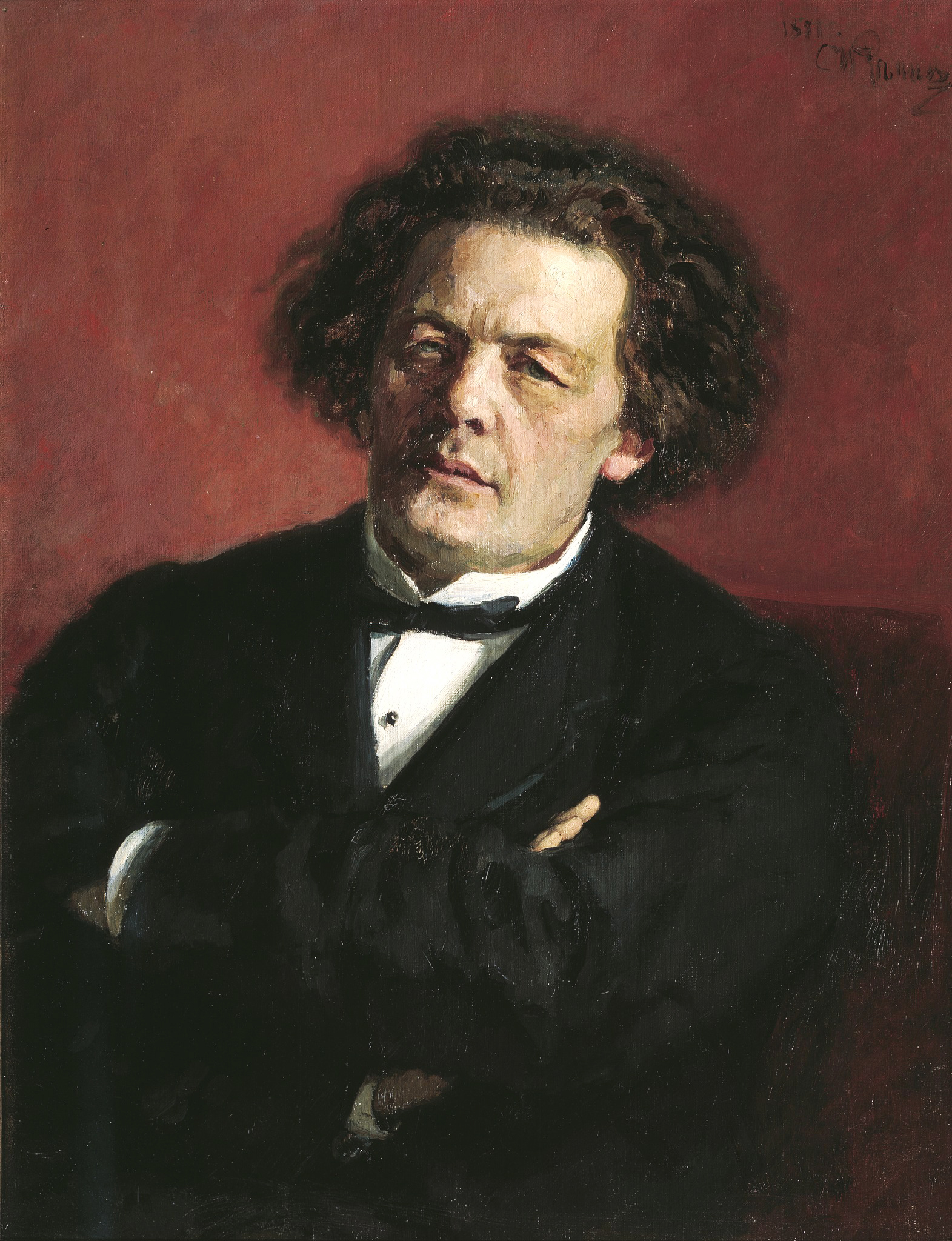
Anton Rubinstein, Tretyakov Gallery, Moscow (1881)

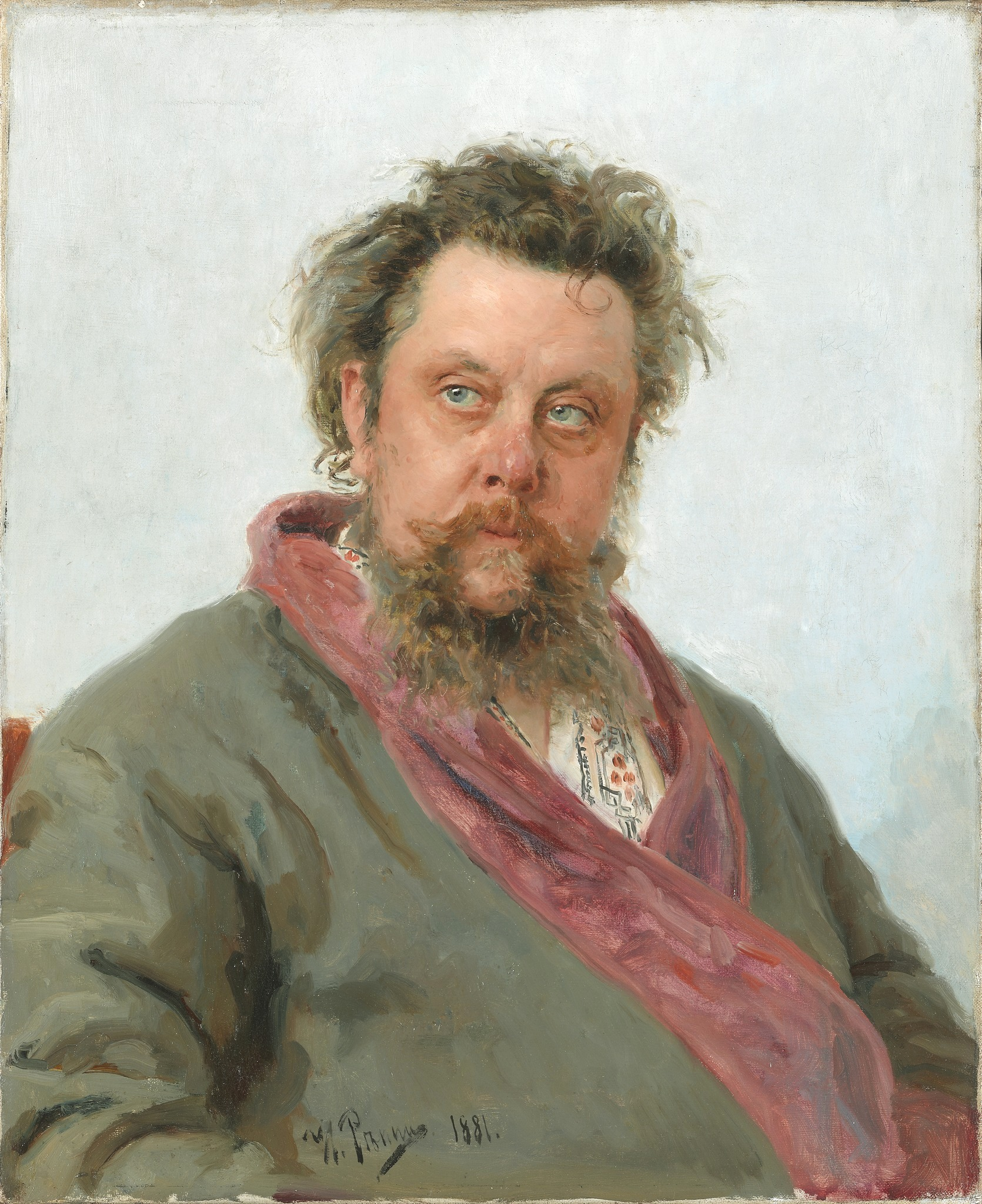
Modest Mussorgsky, Tretyakov Gallery, Moscow (1881)

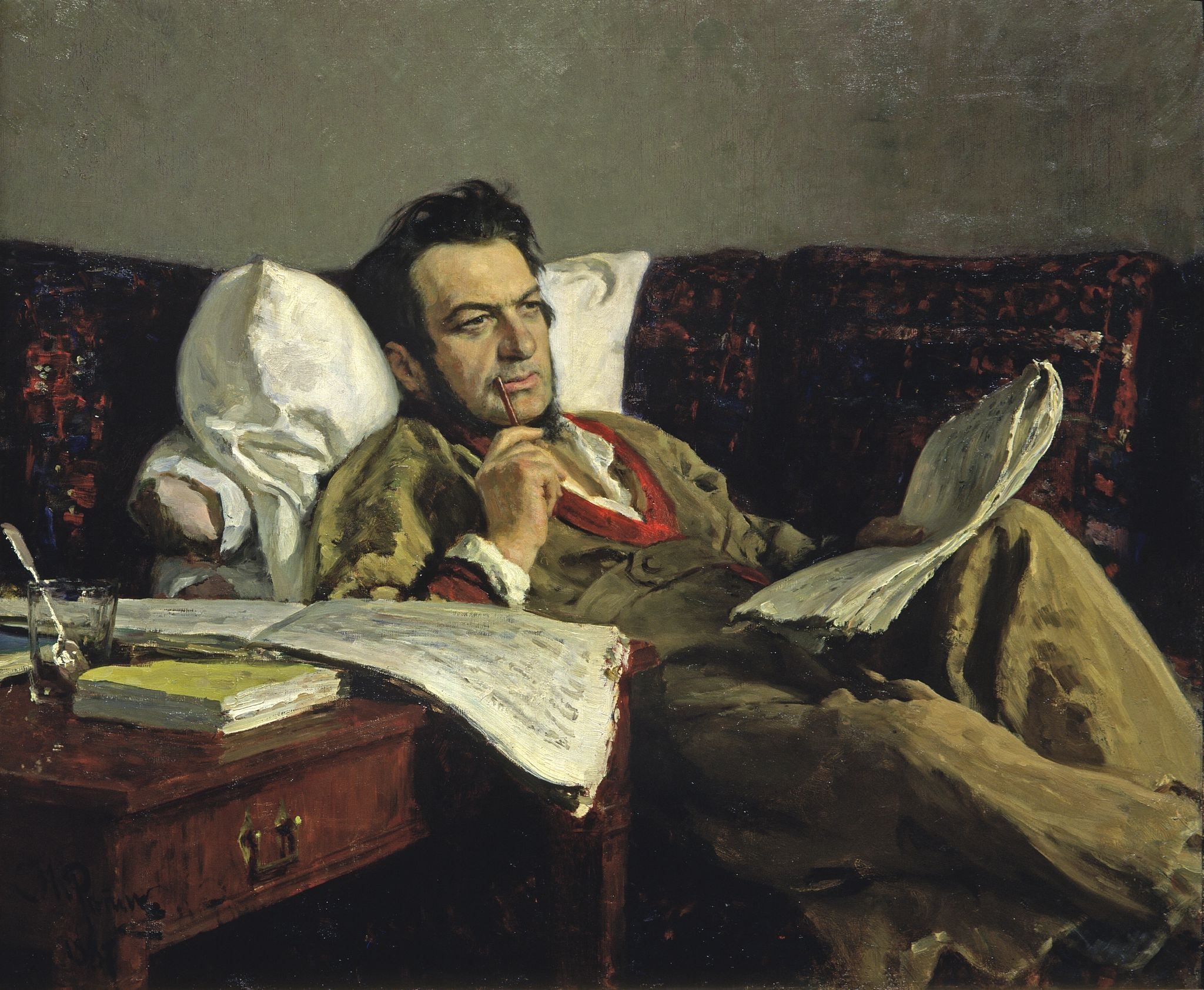
Mikhail Glinka composing the opera Ruslan and Ludmilla, painted thirty years after Glinka's death (1887)

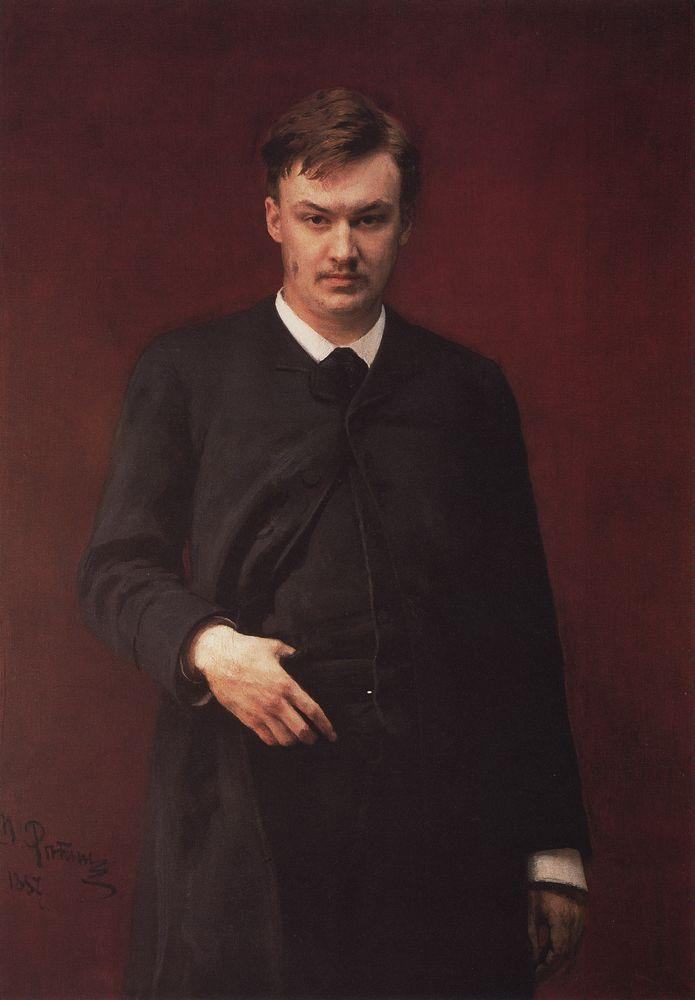
Alexander Glazunov, State Russian Museum, St. Petersburg (1887)

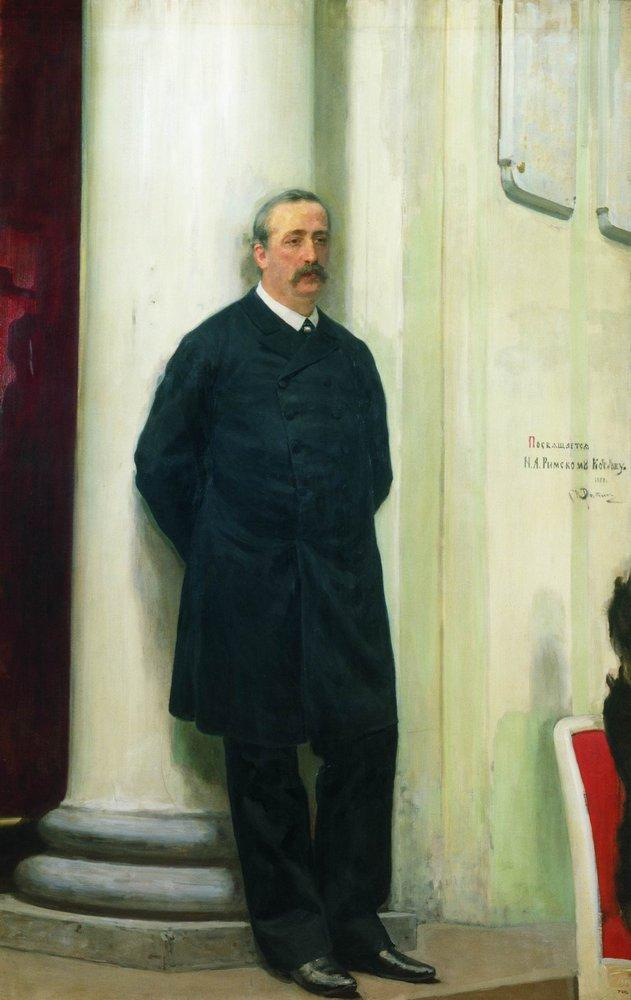
Portrait of composer and chemist Alexander Borodin (1888)

In addition to his portraits of Tolstoy and Russian writers, Repin painted portraits of the major Russian composers of his time, His images, like his paintings of Tolstoy and other writers, became an integral part of the image of these composers. His portrait of Modest Moussorgsky was particularly famous. The composer suffered from alcoholism and depression. Repin painted him in four sittings, beginning four days before his death. When Moussorgsky died, Repin used the proceeds of the sale of the painting to erect a monument to the composer.

His portrait of Mikhail Glinka, composer of the opera Ruslan and Ludmilla (1887) was an unusual work for Repin. The portrait was painted after Glinka's death (Repin never met him), and was based on drawings and recollections of others. Other composers painted by Repin included Alexander Glazunov who had just completed Borodin's opera "Prince Igor", and Anton Rubinstein the founder of the Saint Petersburg Conservatory of Music.

His third daughter, Tatyana, was born in 1880. He frequented the art circle of Savva Mamontov, which gathered at Abramtsevo, his estate near Moscow. Here Repin met many of the leading painters of the day, including Vasily Polenov, Valentin Serov, and Mikhail Vrubel. In 1882 he and Vera divorced; they maintained a friendly relationship afterwards.

Repin's contemporaries often commented on his special ability of capturing peasant life in his works. In an 1876 letter to Stasov, Kramskoi wrote: "Repin is capable of depicting the Russian peasant exactly as he is. I know many artists who have painted peasants, some of them very well, but none of them ever came close to what Repin does." Leo Tolstoy later stated that Repin "depicts the life of the people much better than any other Russian artist." He was praised for his ability to reproduce human life with powerful and vivid force.

=== Reply of the Zaporozhian Cossacks ===
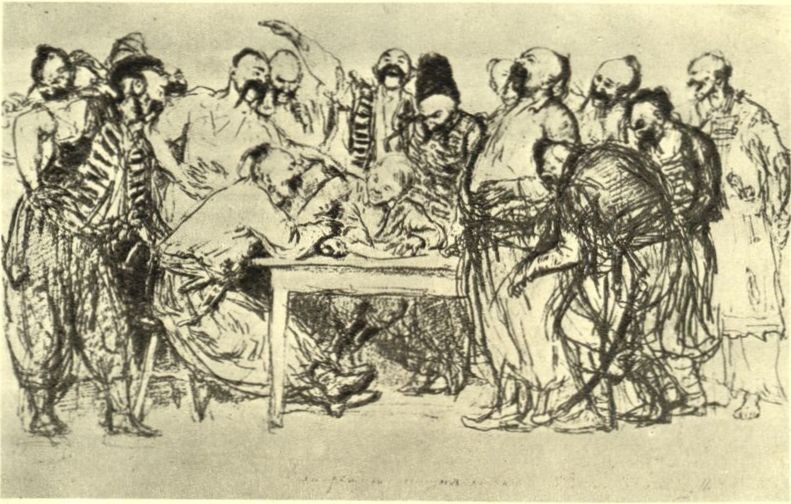
Preparatory sketch, Tretyakov Gallery (1878)

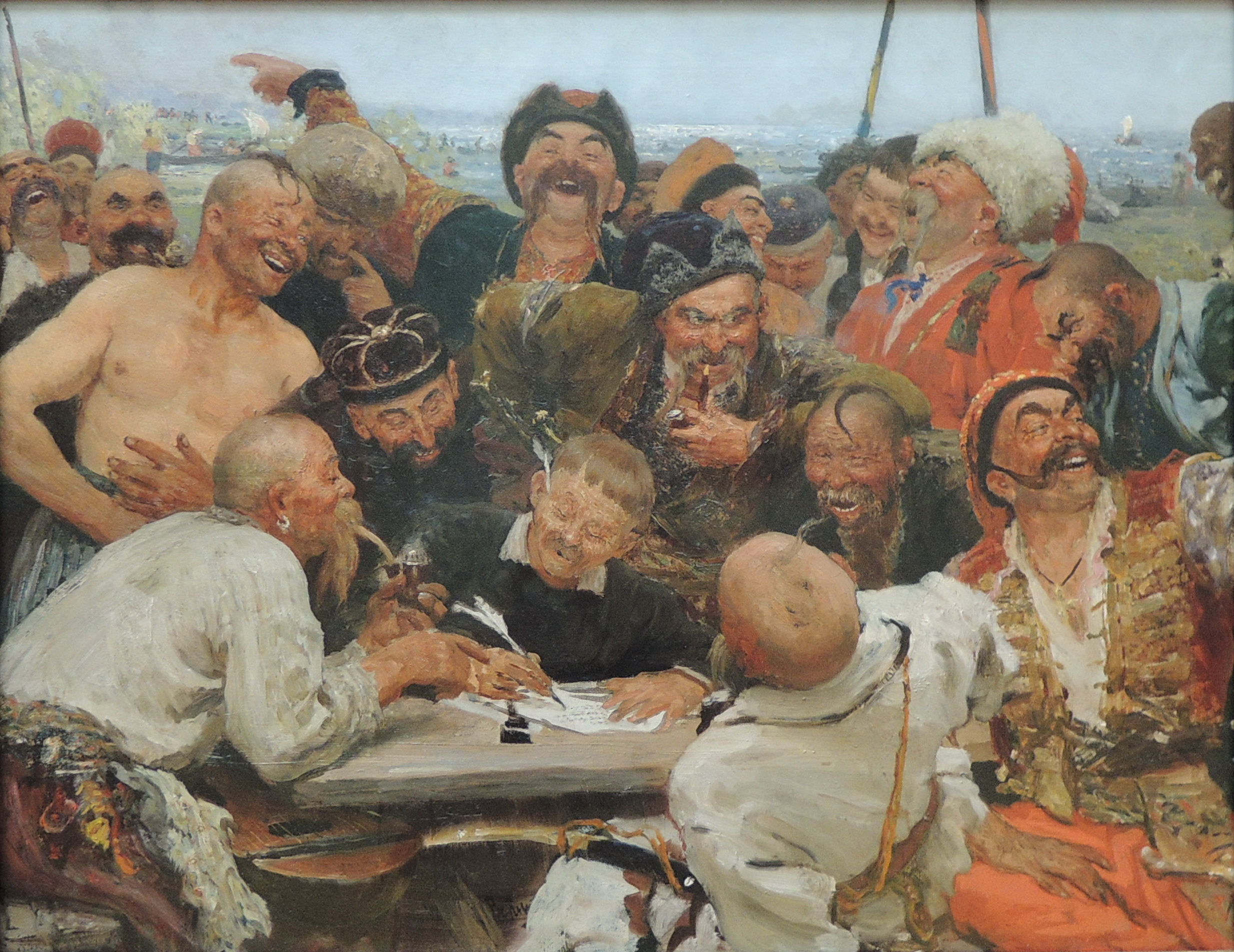
Preliminary version detail (1880–1890)

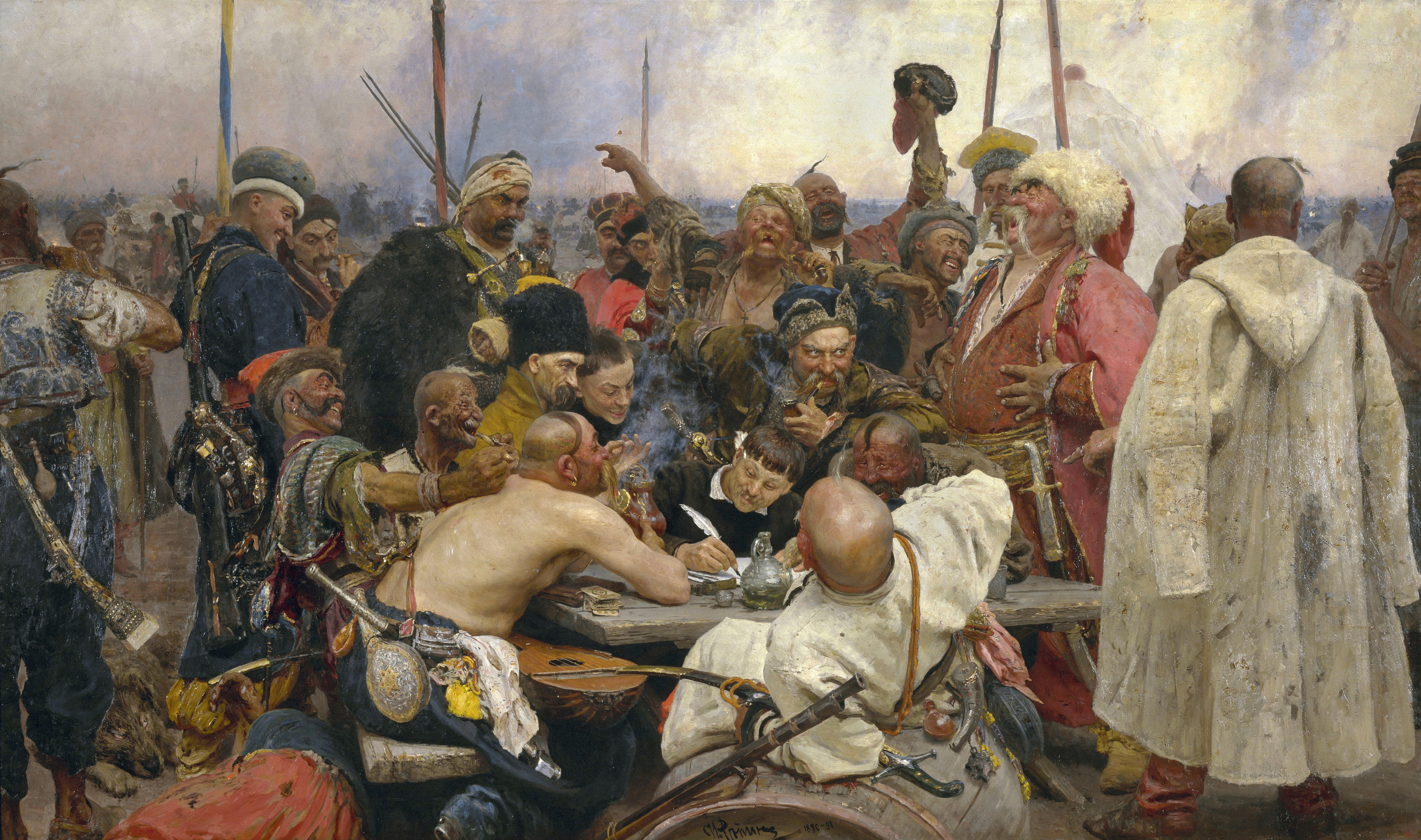
Reply of the Zaporozhian Cossacks to Sultan Mehmed IV, State Russian Museum, Saint Petersburg (1880–1891)

In 1883, he traveled around Western Europe with Vladimir Stasov. Repin's painting Religious Procession in Kursk Province was shown at the eleventh Itinerants' Society Exhibition. In that year, he painted The Wall of Pere Lachaise Cemetery Commemorating the Paris Commune. In 1886, he traveled to the Crimea with Arkhip Kuindzhi, and produced drawings and sketches on biblical subjects.

In 1887, he visited Austria, Italy, and Germany, and retired from the board of the Wanderers, painted two portraits of Leo Tolstoy at Yasnaya Polyana and painted Alexander Pushkin on the Shore of the Black Sea (in collaboration with Ivan Aivazovsky). In 1888, he traveled to southern Russia and the Caucasus, where he did sketches and studies of descendants of the Zaporozhian Cossacks. Throughout the 1870s to 1880s, he visited Chuguyev and gathered materials for his future works. There, he painted his Archdeacon.

Many of Repin's finest portraits were produced in the 1880s. Through the presentation of real faces, these portraits express the rich, tragical, and hopeful spirit of the period. His portraits of Aleksey Pisemsky (1880), Modest Mussorgsky (1881), and others created throughout the decade have become familiar to whole generations of Russians. Each is completely lifelike, conveying the transient, changeable nature of the sitter's state of mind. They give an intense embodiment of both the physical and spiritual life of the people who sat for him.

In 1887 he was separated from his wife Vera. He visited Tolstoy at Yasnaya Polyana, and painted his portrait, and then took a long trip along the Volga and the Don, to the Cossack regions. This trip gave him material for his most famous historical work, Reply of the Zaporozhian Cossacks. The painting depicts an apocryphal event in 1678, when a group of cossacks supposedly amused themselves by drafting a highly insulting letter to the Turkish sultan, addressing him as "The Grand Imbecile". Repin worked on this painting periodically between 1880 and 1891, creating an extraordinary ensemble of expressive faces. Most of the models were faculty members from the Academy of Arts, and had a variety of nationalities, including Russians, Ukrainians, a Cossack student, Greeks, and Poles. The Cossack with a yellow hat, at the top right and almost hidden by Taras Bulba, is Fyodor Stravinsky, an opera singer with the Mariinsky Theatre, of Polish descent, and the father of the composer Igor Stravinsky. The central figure in the painting was inspired by a legendary Cossack leader Ivan Sirko, modeled by Russian General Mikhail Dragomirov. The finished work was so popular that he painted a second version.

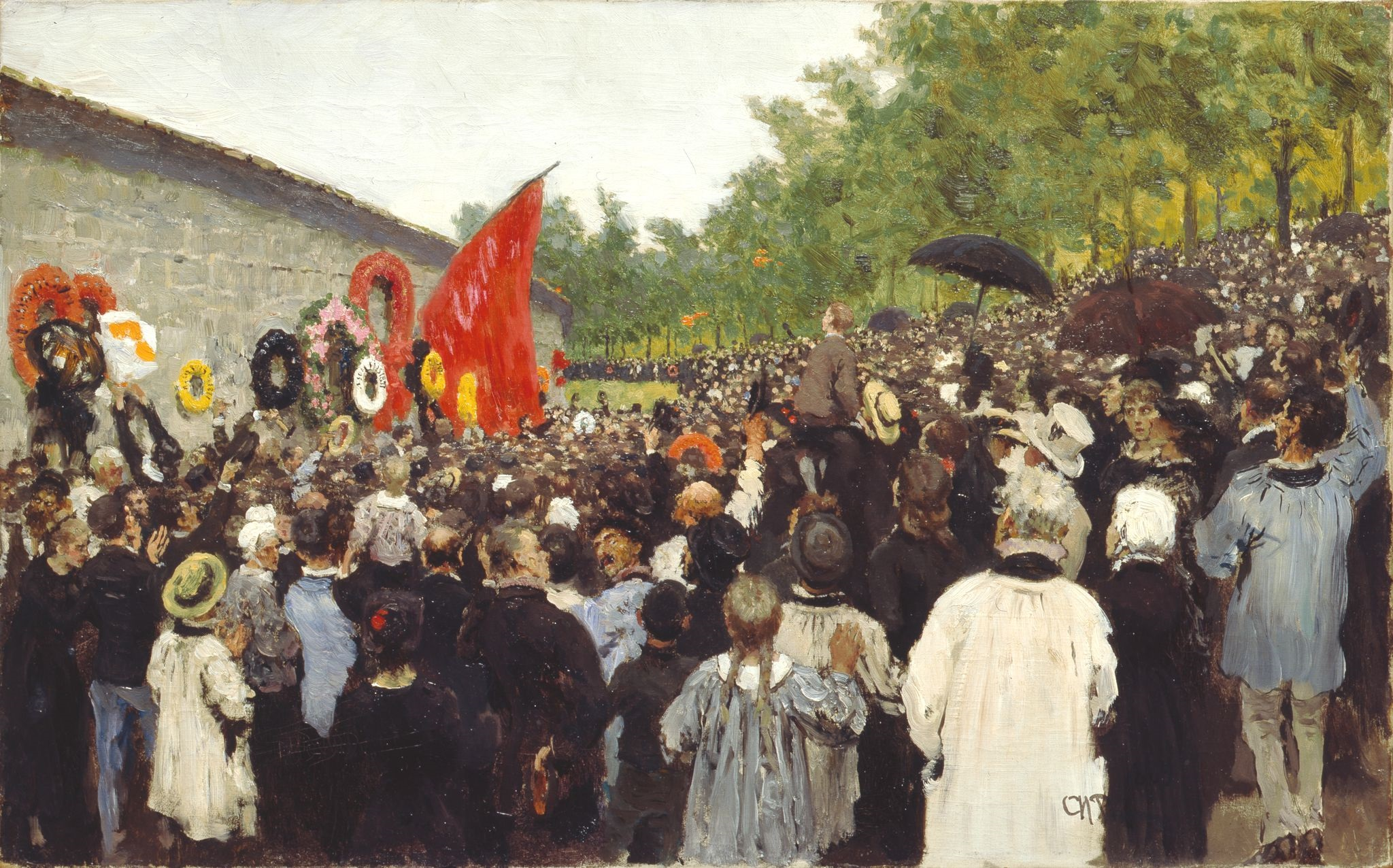
The Wall of Pere Lachaise Cemetery Commemorating the Paris Commune (1883) (Tretyakov Gallery)

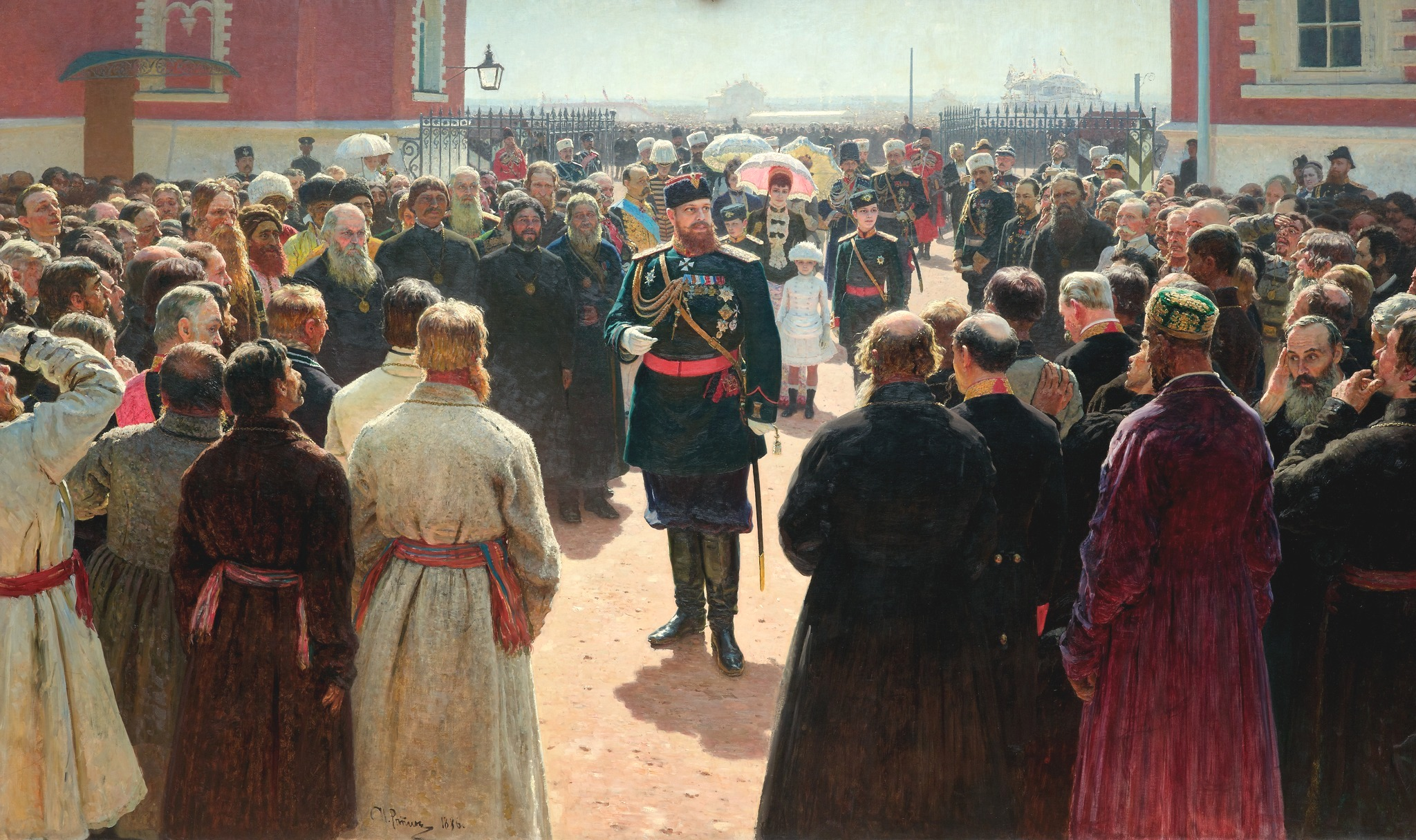
Tsar Alexander III Receives Local Government Officials at Petrovsky Palace (1886)

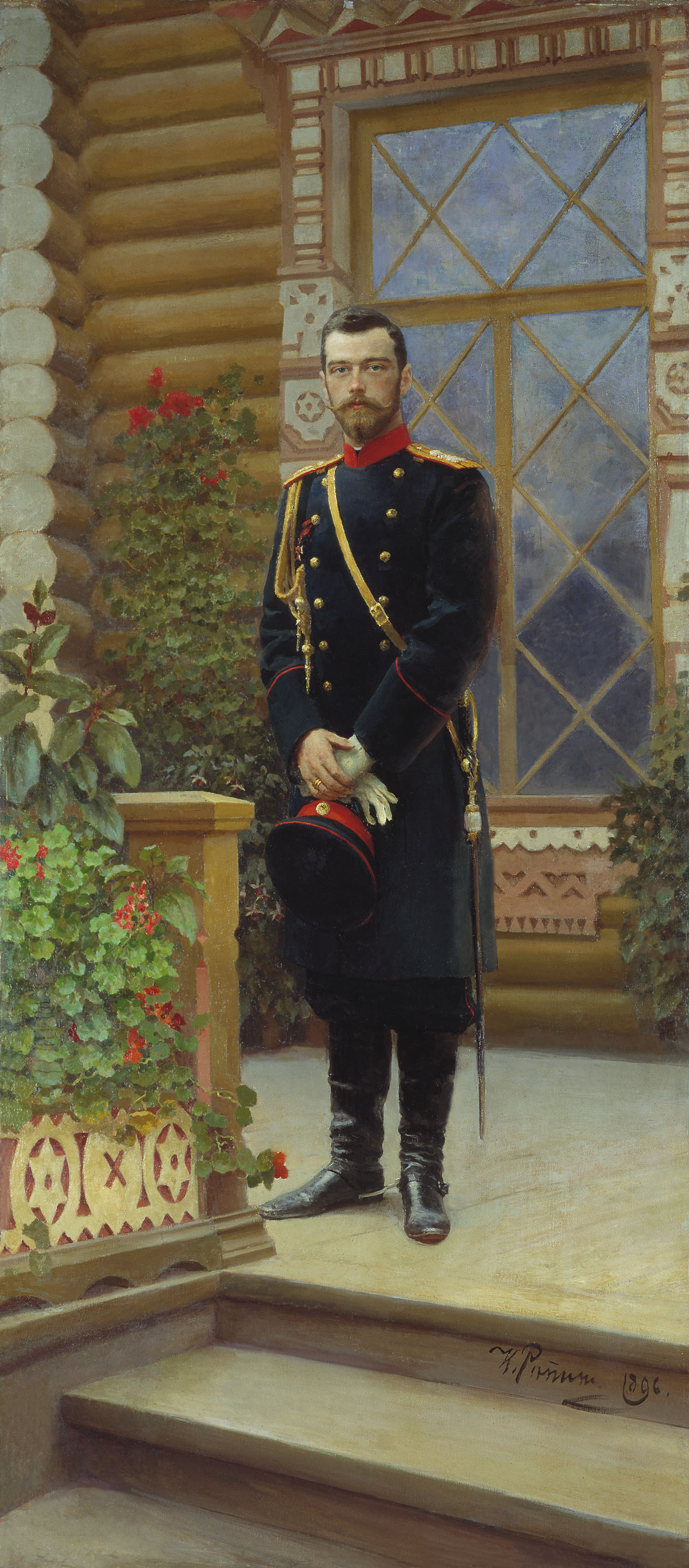
Tsar Nicholas II (1896) by Repin

In 1890, he was given a government commission to work on the creation of a new statute for the Academy of Arts. In 1891 he resigned from the Wanderers in protest against a new statute that restricted the rights of young artists. An exhibition of works by Repin and Shishkin was held in the Academy of Arts, including Reply of the Zaporozhian Cossacks. In 1892 he held a one-man exhibition at the History Museum in Moscow. In 1893 he visited academic art schools in Warsaw, Kraków, Munich, Vienna, and Paris to observe and study teaching methods. He spent the winter in Italy and published his essays Letters on Art.

In 1894, he began teaching a class at the Higher Art School attached to the Academy of Arts, a position he held, off and on, until 1907. In 1895 he painted portraits of Emperor Nicholas II, and Princess Maria Tenisheva. In 1896, he attended the All-Russian Exhibition in Nizhny Novgorod. His paintings were exhibited in Saint Petersburg, at the Exhibition of Works of Creative Art. His paintings from this year included The Duel and Don Juan and Dona Anna. In 1897, he rejoined the Wanderers, and was appointed rector of the Higher Artistic School for a year. In 1898 he traveled to the Holy Land, and painted the icon Carrying the Cross for the Russian Orthodox Alexander Nevsky Cathedral in Jerusalem. After returning to Russia, he attended Pavel Tretyakov's funeral. In 1899 he joined the editorial board of the magazine World of Art, but soon quit.

=== Move to Finland (1890) ===
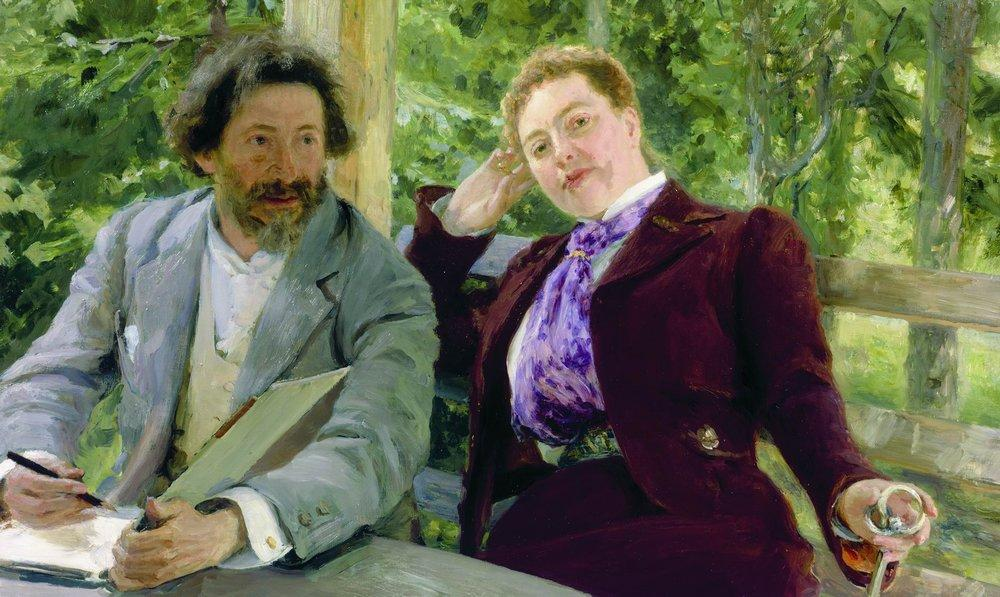
Self-portrait with Natalia Nordman (1903). Ateneum, Helsinki.

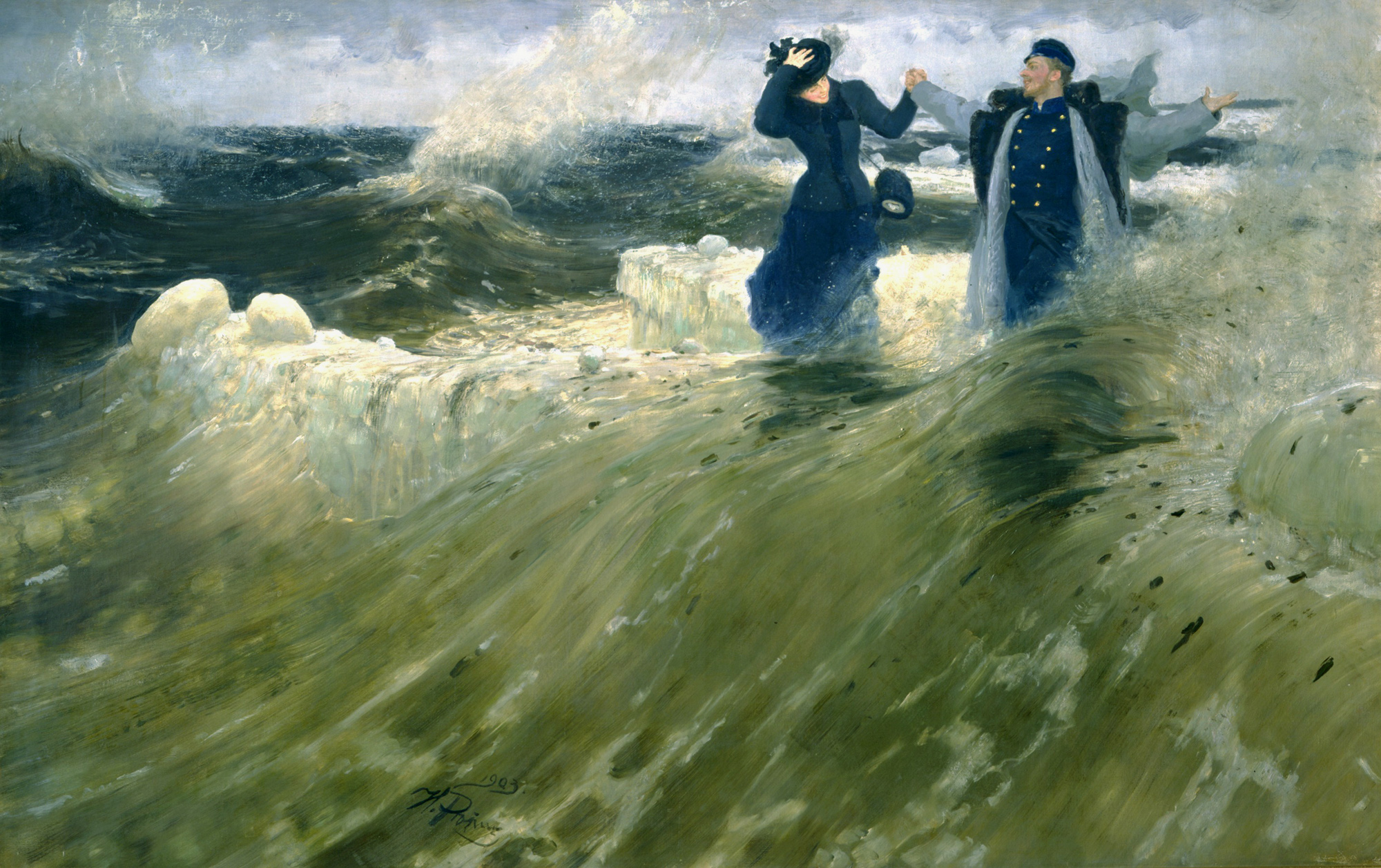
What Freedom! (1903)

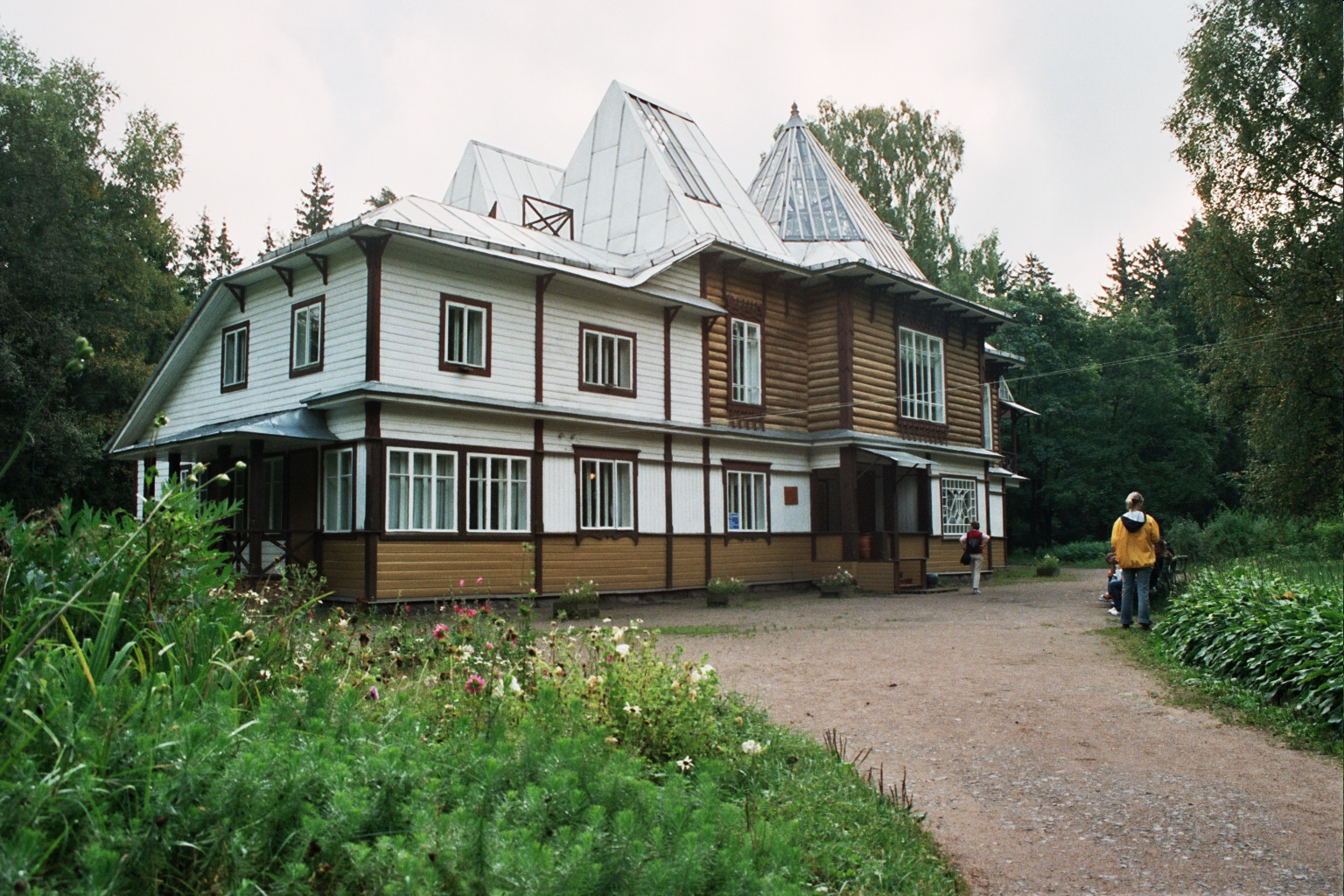
The Penaty Memorial Estate, originally in Finland, now in Repino, Saint Petersburg

In 1890, Repin met Natalia Nordman (1863–1914), who became his common-law wife. She was the daughter of an admiral, a writer and feminist, an activist for the improvement of working conditions. She advocated a simple life close to nature. In 1899, he acquired land near the village of Kuokkala, about forty kilometres north of St. Petersburg, and they built what is the Penaty Memorial Estate, a country house, which became his home for the next thirty years. It was located in the Viipuri Province of the Grand Duchy of Finland, about an hour by train from St. Petersburg. At first he used it only as a summer house, but after he resigned from the St. Petersburg Academy of Fine Arts in 1907, it became his full-time home and studio. It was a rather eccentric estate, including a studio covered with a pyramidal lantern roof, a landscape garden with a "Pushkin alley" of trees, a multicoloured music kiosk in the Egyptian style, and a telescope overlooking the Gulf of Finland. He hosted vegetarian breakfasts for his guests (a practice he adapted from Tolstoy), and very elaborate receptions on Wednesdays. His Wednesday guests included the opera singer Chaliapin, the writer Maxim Gorky, the composer Alexander Glazunov the writer Aleksandr Kuprin; artists Vasily Polenov, Isaak Brodsky and Nicolai Fechin as well as poet Vladimir Mayakovsky, philosopher Vasily Rozanov and scientist Vladimir Bekhterev.

In 1900, he took Nordman to the World Exhibition in Paris, where he served as a painting judge. They visited Munich, the Tyrol, and Prague, His painting Get Thee Behind Me, Satan! was shown at the 29th Exhibition of the Wanderers. In 1901, he received from the tsar one of his largest commissions, portraits of all sixty members of State Council. He proceeded with the help of photographs and the aid of two of his students. One of the subjects was Alexander Kerensky, the Russian president before the Bolshevik seizure of power. In addition to his government commissions, he found time for a light work on an entirely different theme; a painting in 1902–1903 called What Freedom! depicting two students dancing in the waves at the beach after completing their examinations.

=== Revolution and disillusion (1900–1905) ===
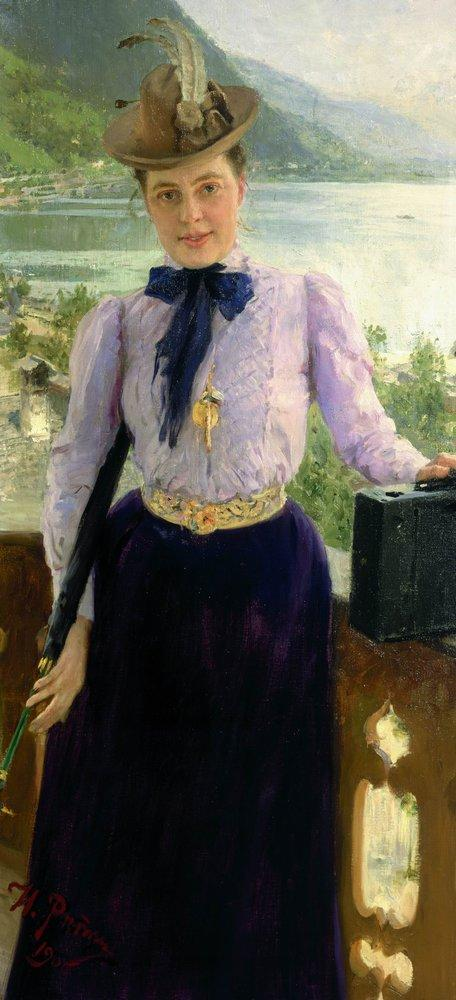
Natalia Nordman in a Tyrolese Hat (1900)

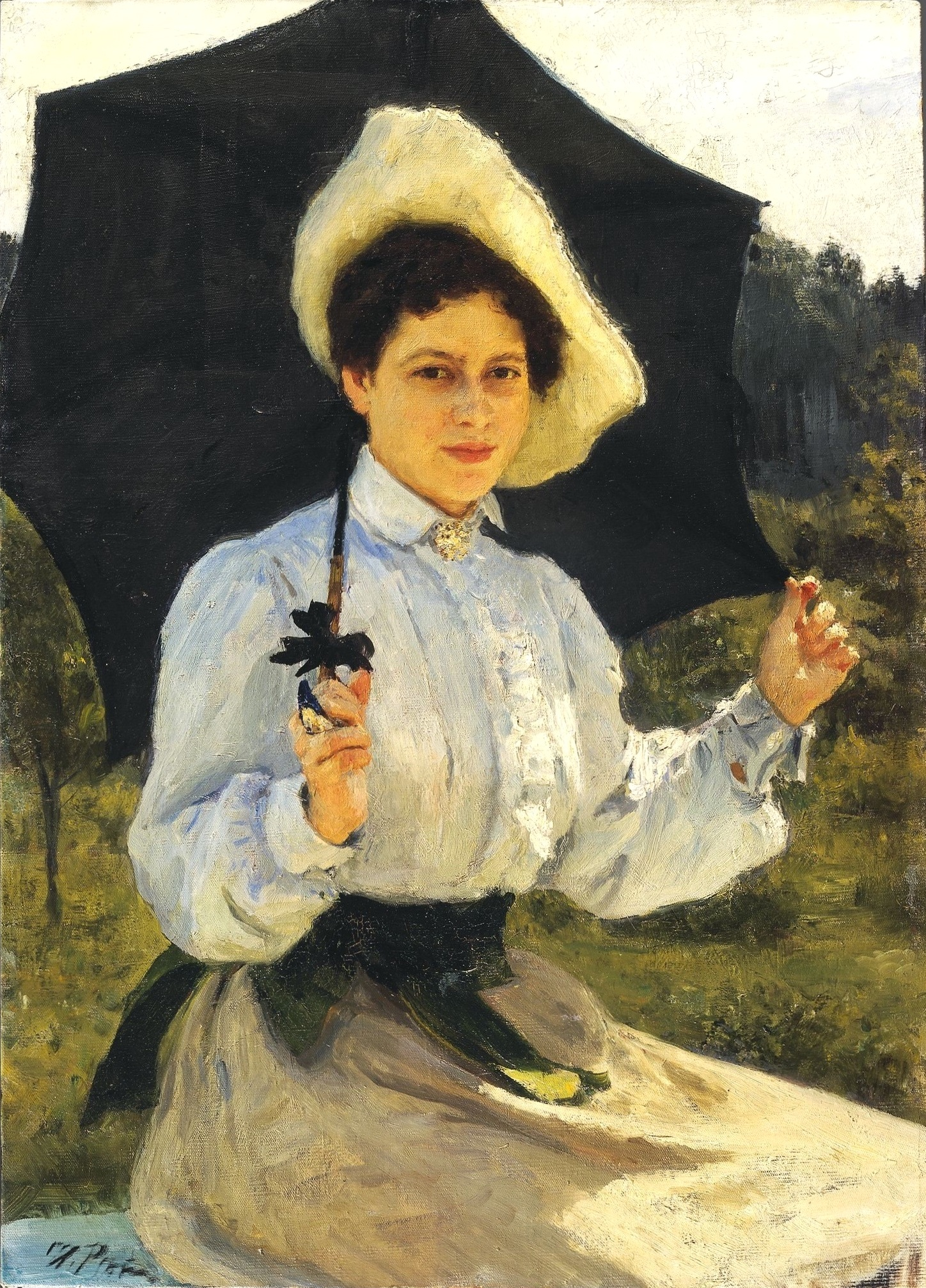
In the Sunlight: Portrait of Nadezhda Repina (1900)

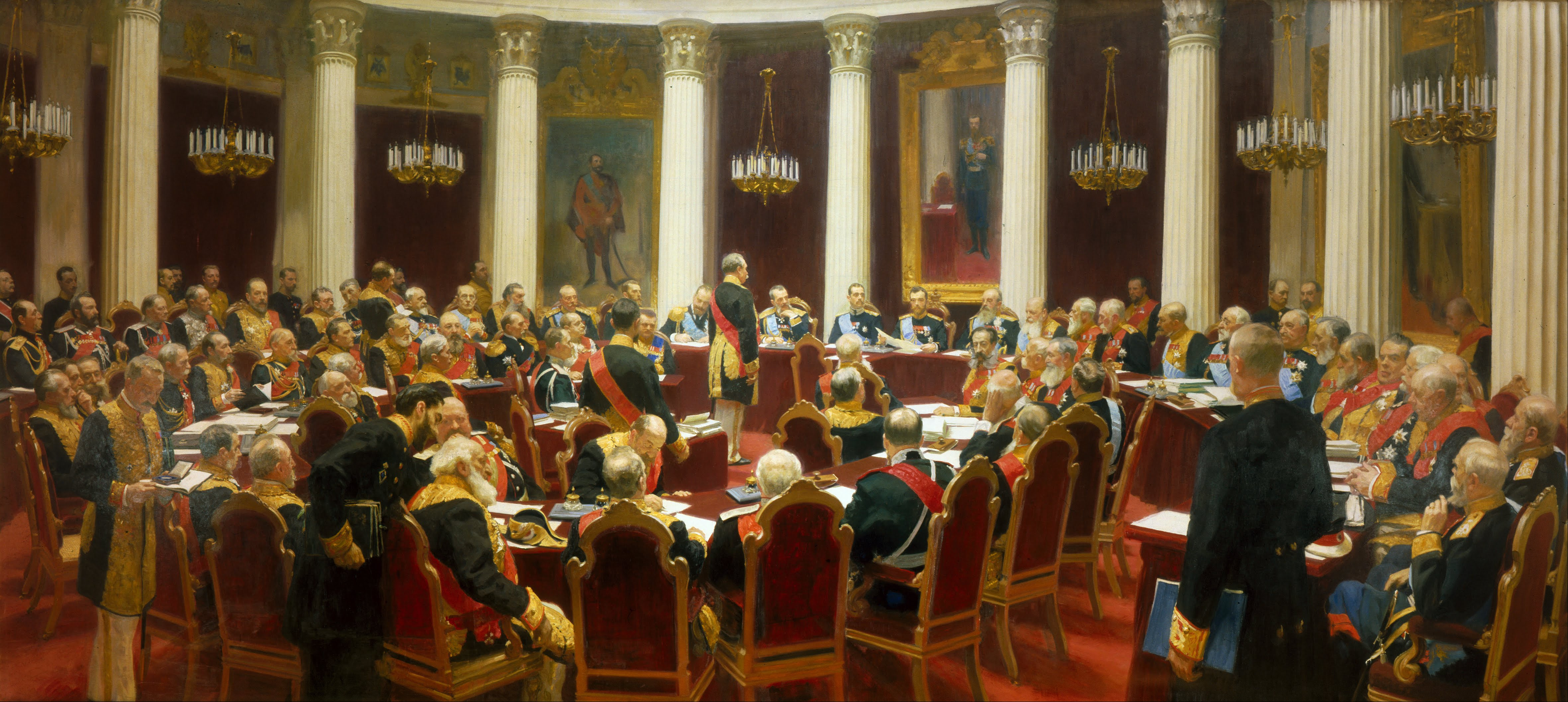
Ceremonial Sitting of the State Council on 7 May 1901 Marking the Centenary of its Foundation (1902–1903). Repin was a pioneer in photographic realism.

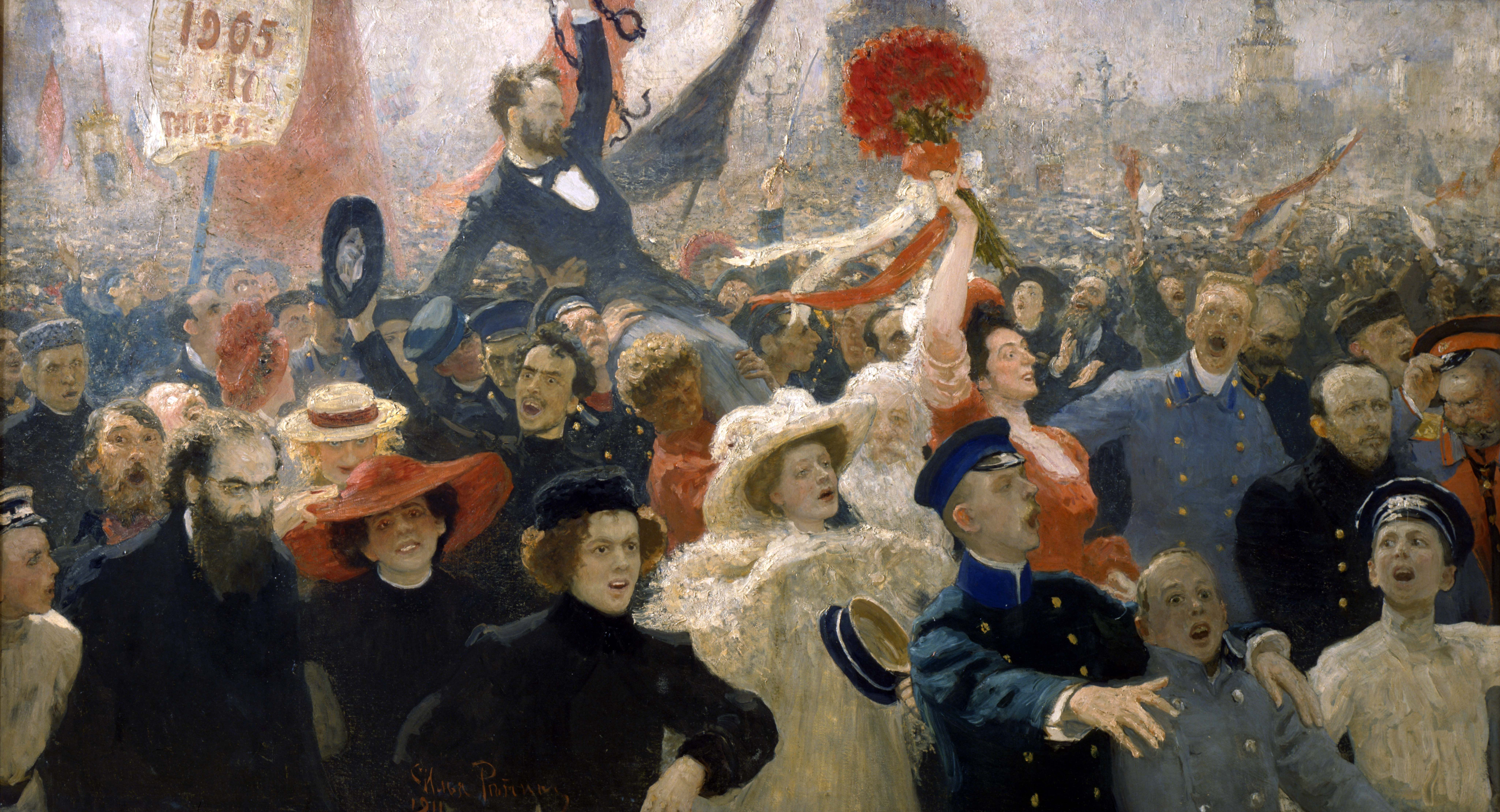
Demonstration on 17 October 1905 (1905)

The repression of popular demonstrations in front of the Winter Palace in St. Petersburg in 1905 disillusioned Repin. He called 1905 "the year of disaster and shame". He resigned from his teaching post at the Academy of Fine Arts, and concentrated on painting. The movements toward democracy in the early 20th century inspired Repin, he joined the Constitutional Democratic Party, was offered the rank of Councillor of State, and was invited to take a seat in the Duma, the national assembly. He made a colourful painting of the celebration of the new Russian Constitution of 1905. Later, he painted the portrait of the newly-elected Russian President, Alexander Kerensky.

Repin concentrated on writing his memoirs, which he finished in 1915. He visited St. Peterburg to see expositions, including a 1909 show of works by the modernist Wassily Kandinsky. Repin was not impressed; he described it as "the swamps of artistic corruption".

He visited Munich, the Tyrol, and Prague, and painted Natalia Nordman in a Tyrolese Hat and In the Sunlight: Portrait of Nadezhda Repina. In 1901, he was awarded the Legion of Honor. In 1902–1903, his works included the paintings Ceremonial Meeting of the State Council and What a Freedom!, over forty portrait studies, and portraits of Sergei Witte and Vyacheslav von Plehve.

In 1904, he gave a speech at a memorial gathering for the artist Vasily Vereshchagin. He painted a portrait of the writer Leonid Andreyev and his work The Death of the Cossack Squadron Commander Zinovyev. He made sketches depicting government troops opening fire on a peaceful demonstration on 9 December 1905. During 1905 Repin participated in many protests against bloodshed and tsarist repressions, and tried to convey his impressions of these emotionally and politically charged events in his paintings.

He also did sketches for portraits of Maxim Gorky and Vladimir Stasov and two portraits of Natalia Nordman. In 1907, he resigned from the Academy of Arts, visited Chuguyev and the Crimea, and wrote reminiscences of Vladimir Stasov. In 1908, he publicly denounced capital punishment in Russia. He illustrated Leonid Andreyev's story The Seven Who Were Hanged, and his painting The Cossacks from the Black Sea Coast was exhibited at the Itinerants' Society Exhibition. In 1909, he painted Gogol Burning the Manuscript of the Second Part of Dead Souls, and in 1910, portraits of Pyotr Stolypin, and the children's writer and poet Korney Chukovsky.

=== War, the Bolshevik Revolution and later years (1917–1930) ===
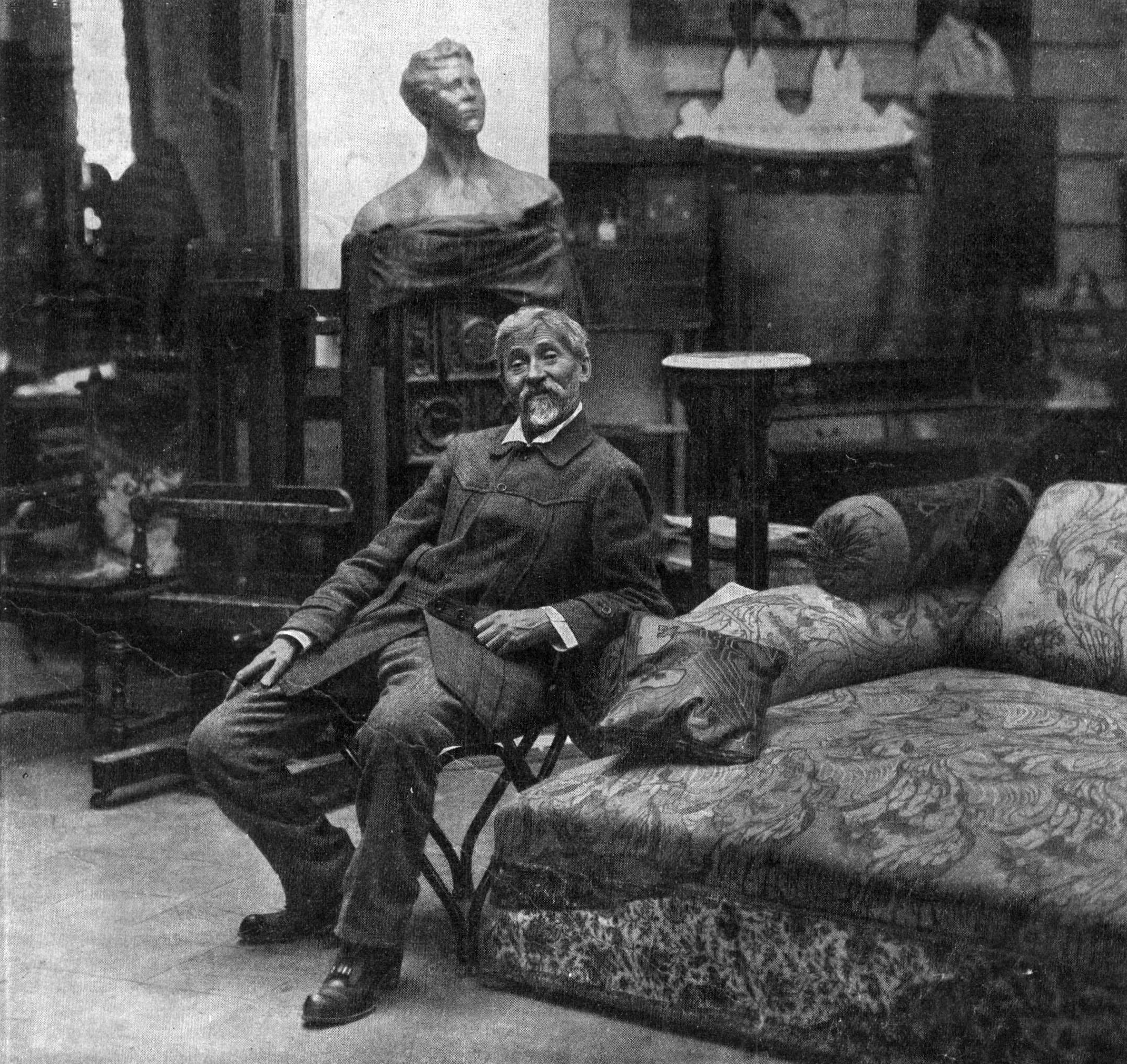
Repin in his studio at the Penaty Memorial Estate (1914)

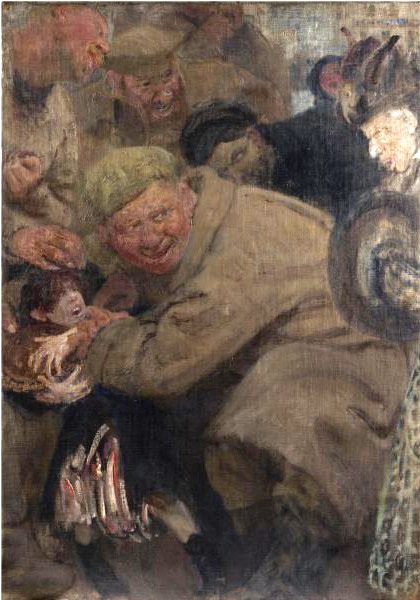
Drawing of a Red Army soldier stealing bread from a child (1918)

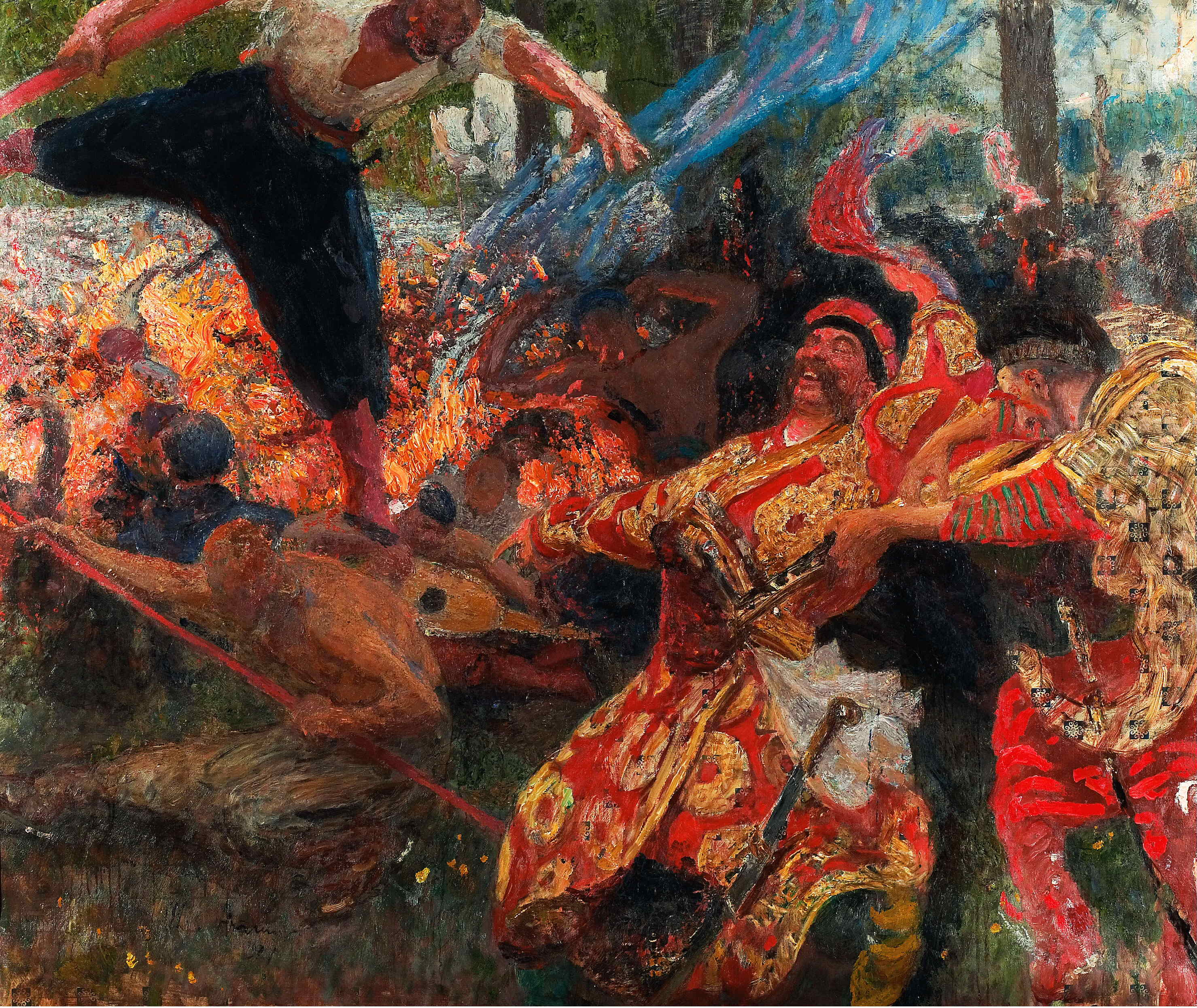
The Gopak, the last painting of Repin (1926–30), painted on linoleum, because he could not get a canvas large enough

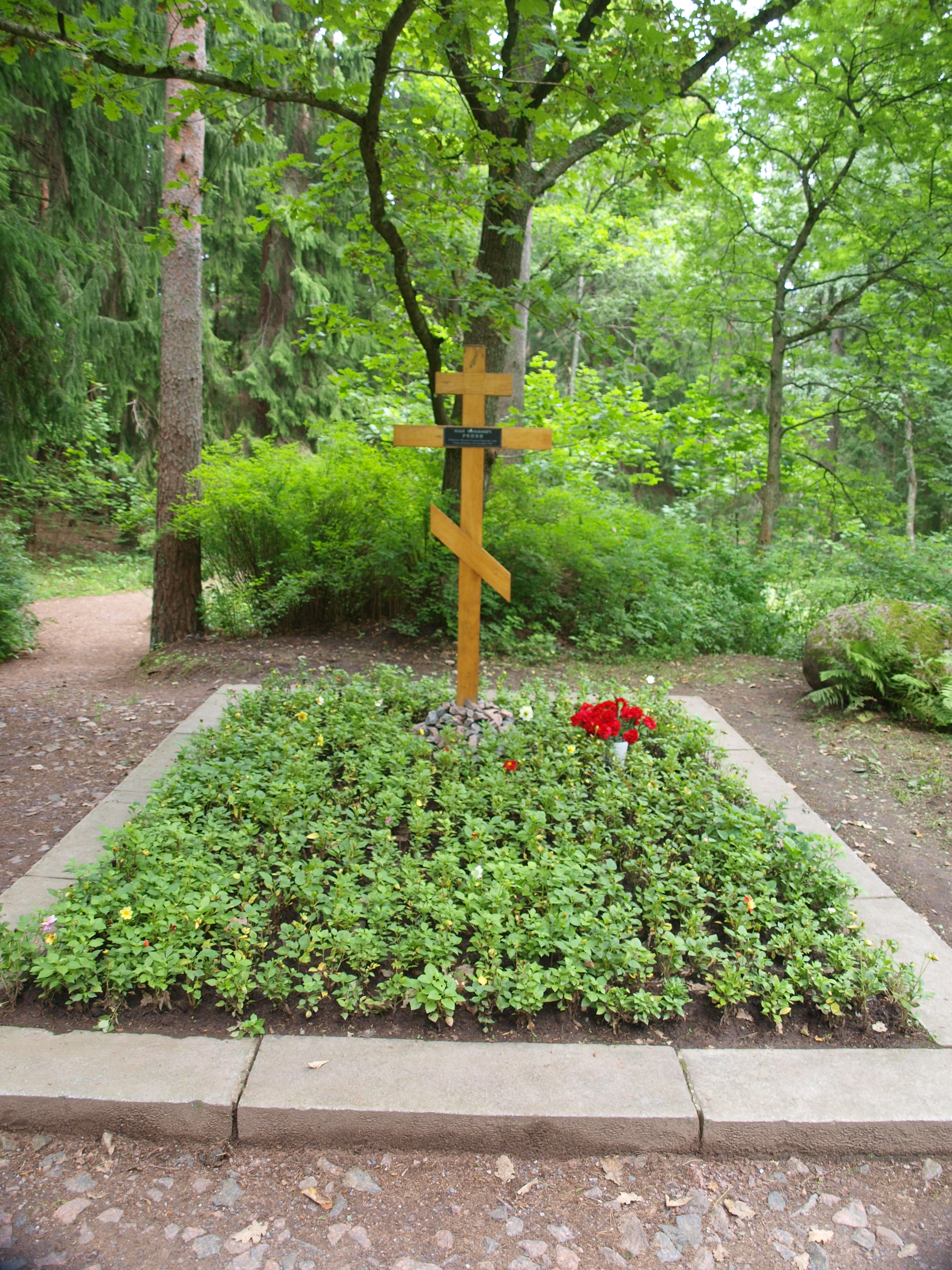
The tomb of Repin at the Penaty Memorial Estate

The outbreak of the First World War in 1914 brought a series of setbacks and tragedies to Repin. His wife became ill with tuberculosis, and departed for treatment in Locarno, Switzerland. She refused assistance from her family and died in Switzerland in 1914. Then, following the October 1917 Bolshevik Revolution, Finland, including Rupin's home, "The Penates" ('Penaty' in Russian), declared its independence from Russia. The border was closed, and Repin refused to return to Russia. He turned to Finland for new clients, painting a large group portrait of notable Finnish leaders and artists, including the architect Eliel Saarinen, the composer Jean Sibelius, and the future Finnish president, Carl Gustav Mannerheim. Repin included the back of his own head in the painting.

In 1916, Repin worked on his book of reminiscences, Far and Near, with the assistance of Korney Chukovsky. He welcomed the early phases of the Russian Revolution, namely the February Revolution of February 1917. In 1919, he donated his collection of works by Russian artists and his own works to the Finnish National Gallery in Helsinki, and in 1920, honorary celebrations of Repin were held by artistic circles in Finland. In 1921–1922, he painted The Ascent of Elijah the Prophet and Christ and Mary Magdalene (The Morning of the Resurrection).

Sources on his view of the October Revolution are sparse, though it is clear that his opinions were varied. He had favorable views on the separation of church and state, the extension of educational opportunities, and their work on social equality. In 1926 he planned a large canvas, to commemorate the 10th anniversary of the October Revolution, titled Overthrow of Autocracy. Conversely, he bemoaned the abolition of private property and the loss of his bank accounts. He also had doubts that great art could ever be made in such a system, stating in a 1926 letter that: "Art loves wealth and flourishes only in its presence." One specific point of contention with the Soviet government was their spelling reform, demanding that his texts be published in the old orthography.

After end of the war in 1918, Repin could travel again. In 1923, Repin held a one-man exhibition in Prague. Celebrations were given in 1924 in Kuokkala to mark Repin's 80th birthday, and an exhibition of his works was held in Moscow. In 1925, a jubilee exhibition of his works was held in the Russian Museum in Leningrad (renamed St Petersburg-Petrograd). The new Soviet leader, Joseph Stalin, sent a delegation of Soviet artists, including a former student of Repin, Isaak Brodsky, to persuade Repin to return to St. Petersburg, and to give up his residence in Finland. Repin refused this offer, though he donated three sketches devoted to the Revolution of 1905 and the portrait of Alexander Kerensky to the Museum of the Revolution of 1905. In 1928–1929, while still in Finland, he continued working on the painting The Hopak Dance (The Zaporozhye Cossacks Dancing), begun in 1926, which was his final work. It portrays Repin's admiration of Ukraine and its culture. Repin painted it with oil on linoleum, because he could not get a canvas large enough.

Repin died in 1930, and was buried at The Penates ('Penaty'). In one of his last letters he wrote: "kind, dear compatriots [...] I ask you to believe in the sense of my devotion and endless regret that I can't move to live in a sweet, joyful Ukraine [...] Loving you from the childhood, Ilya Repin". After the Winter War in 1939, the territory of Kuokkala was annexed by the Soviet Union. In 1948, it was renamed Repino in his honor. The Penates became a museum in 1940, and is now a UNESCO World Heritage Site.

== Portraits ==
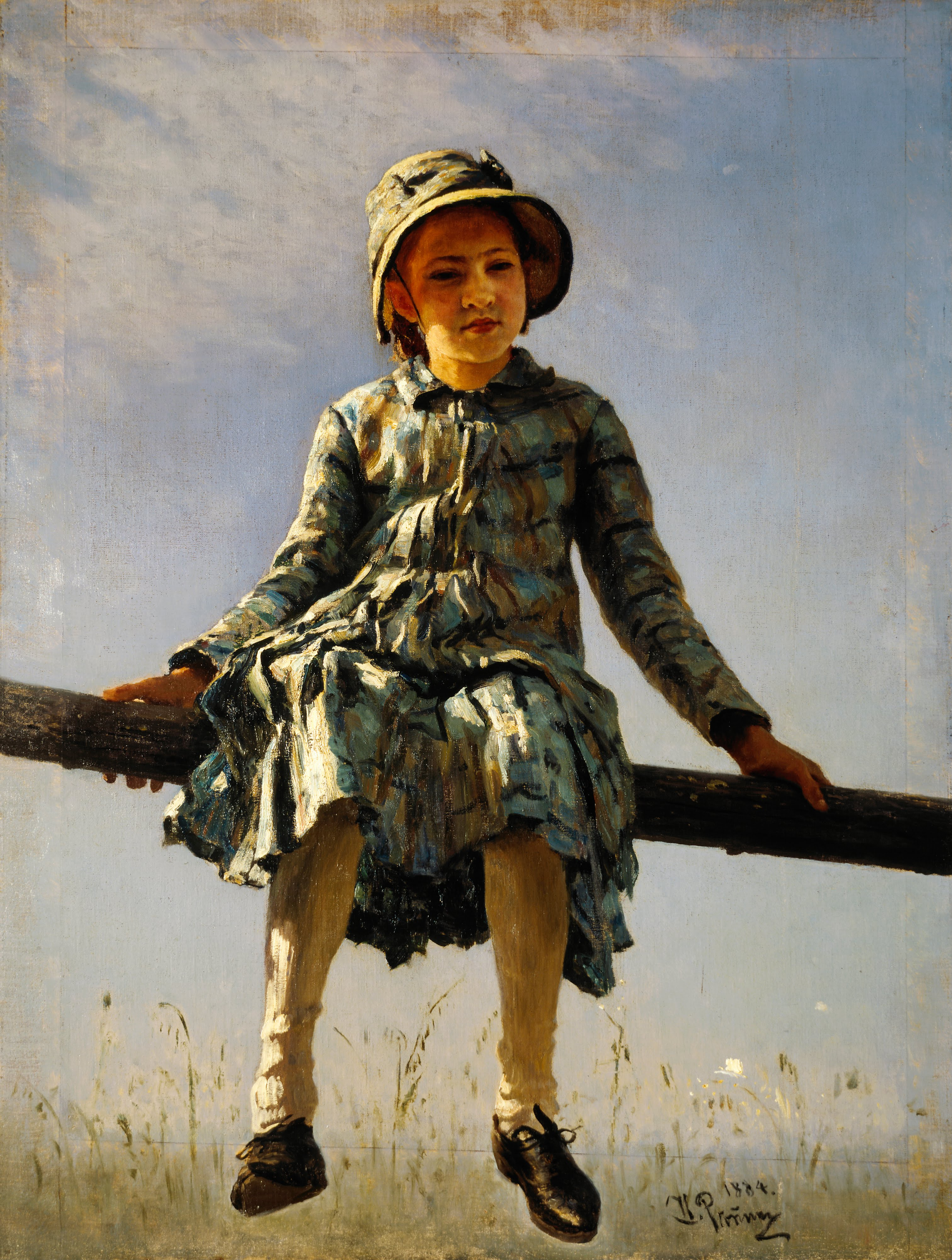
The Dragonfly, Repin's daughter Vera, aged twelve (1884)

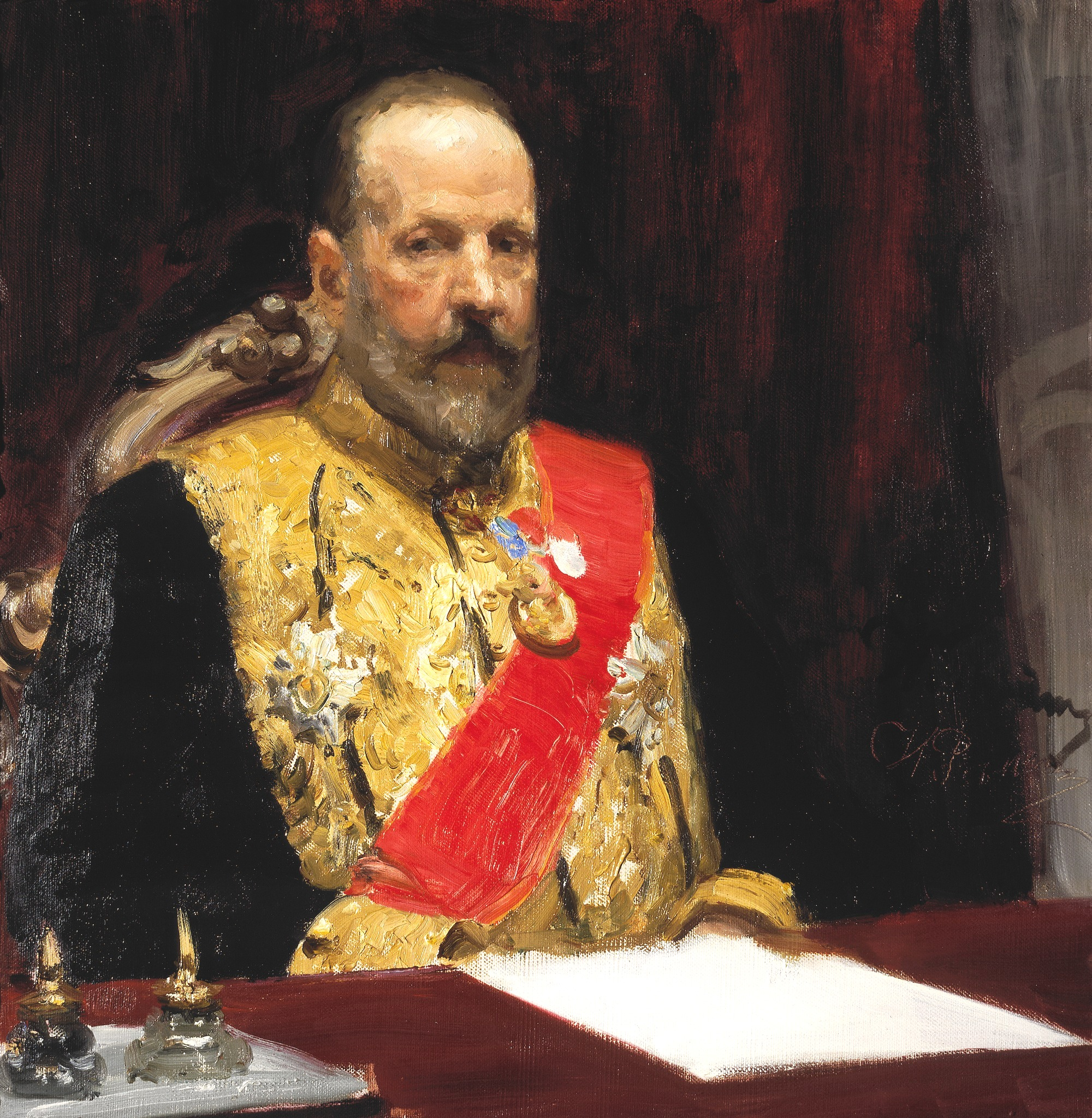
Sketch for Portrait of Sergei Witte, the first prime minister of the new Russian government (1903)

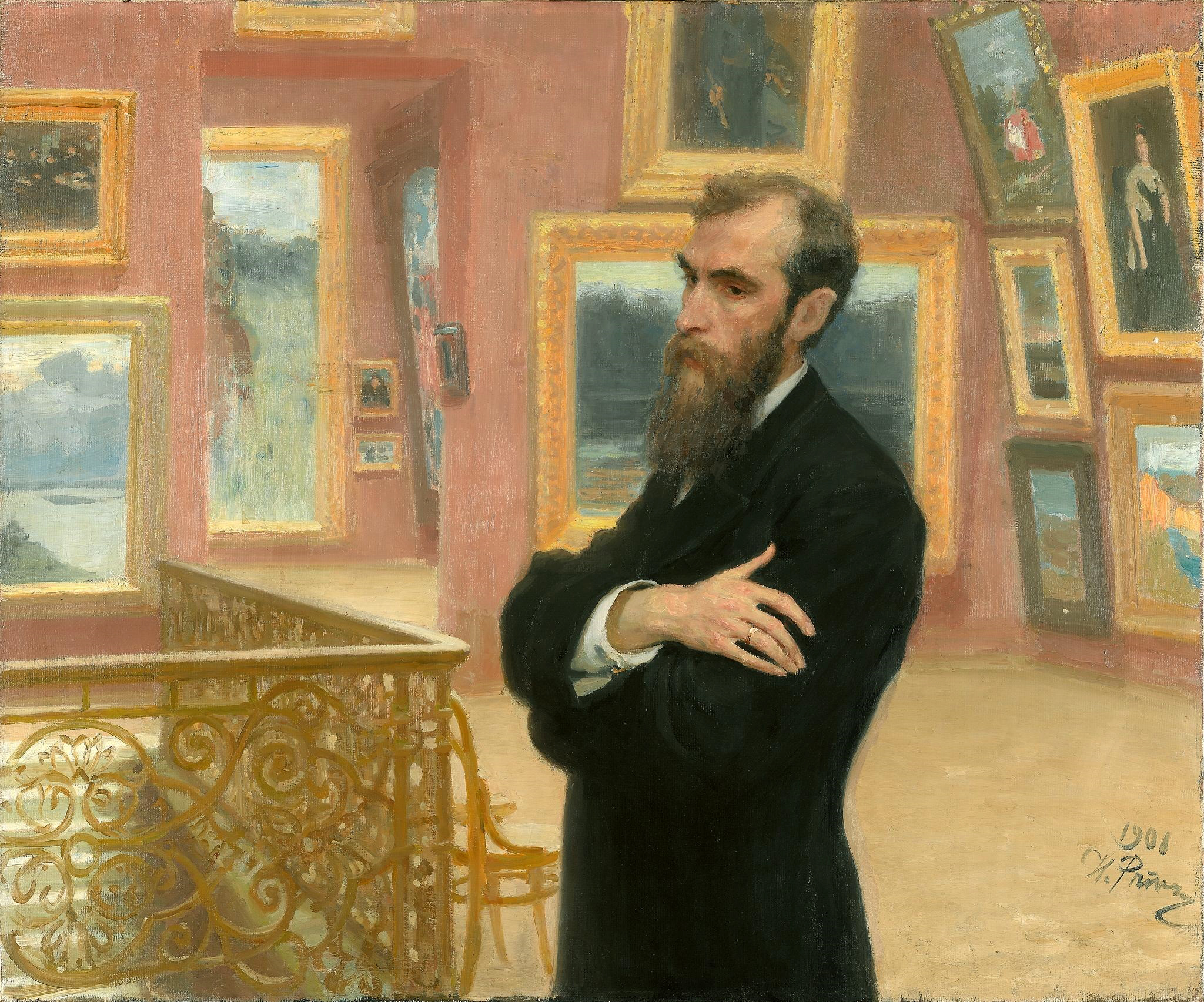
Portrait of Pavel Mikhailovich Tretyakov, founder of the Tretyakov Gallery

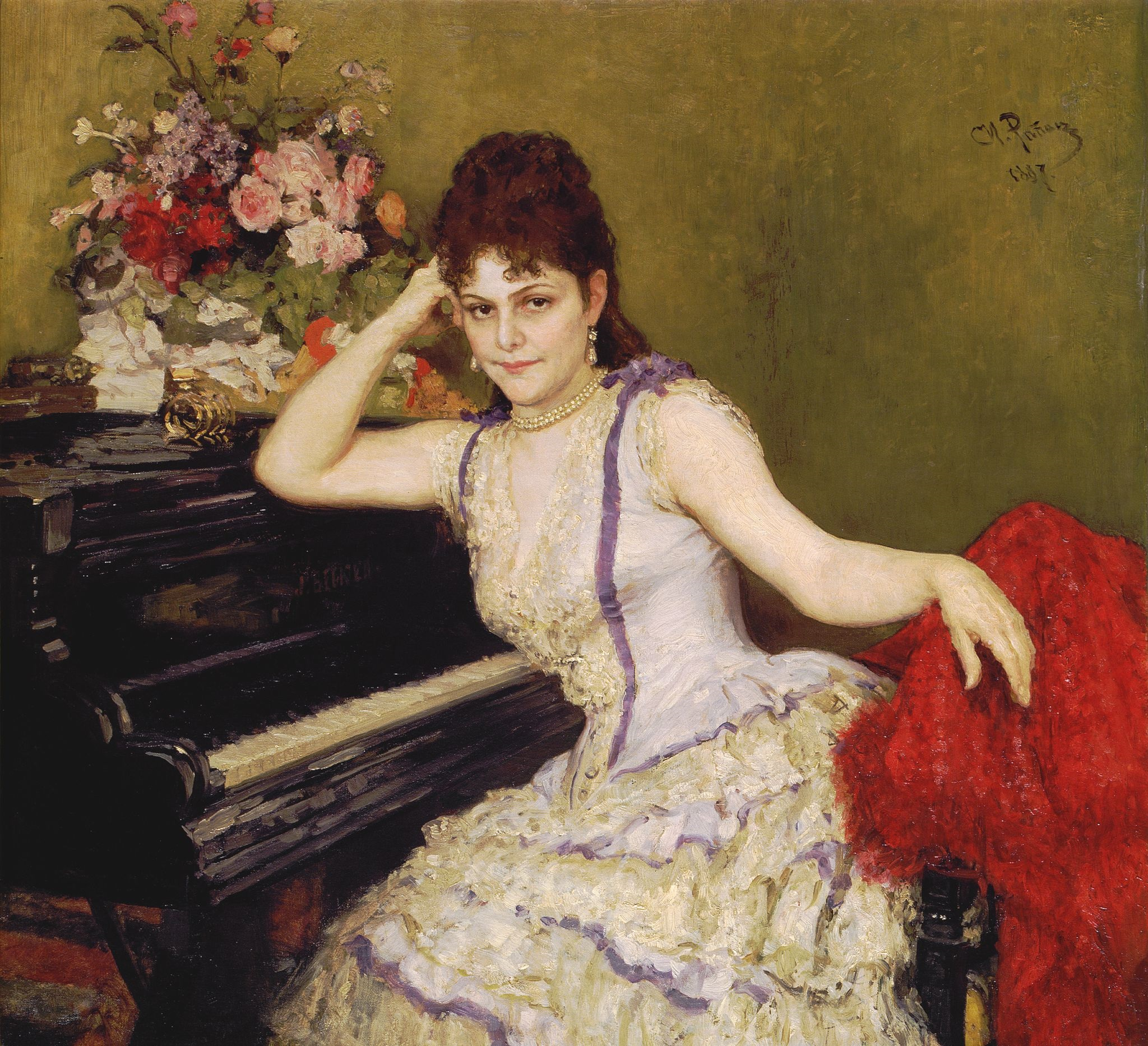
Portrait of Sophie Menter, pianist and professor of music at the Saint Petersburg Conservatory

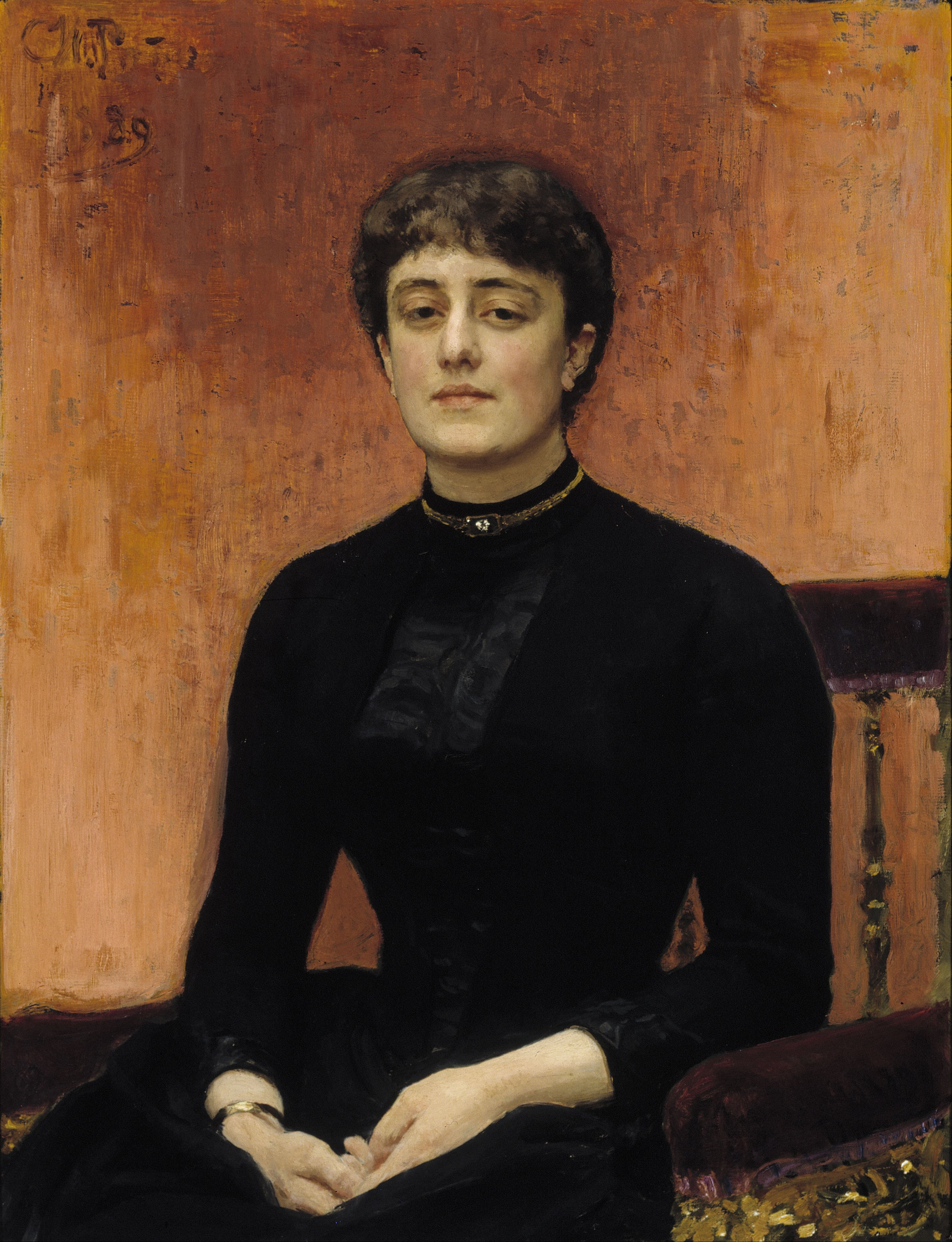
Painter Elizaveta Zvantseva, Ateneum Gallery, Helsinki (1889)

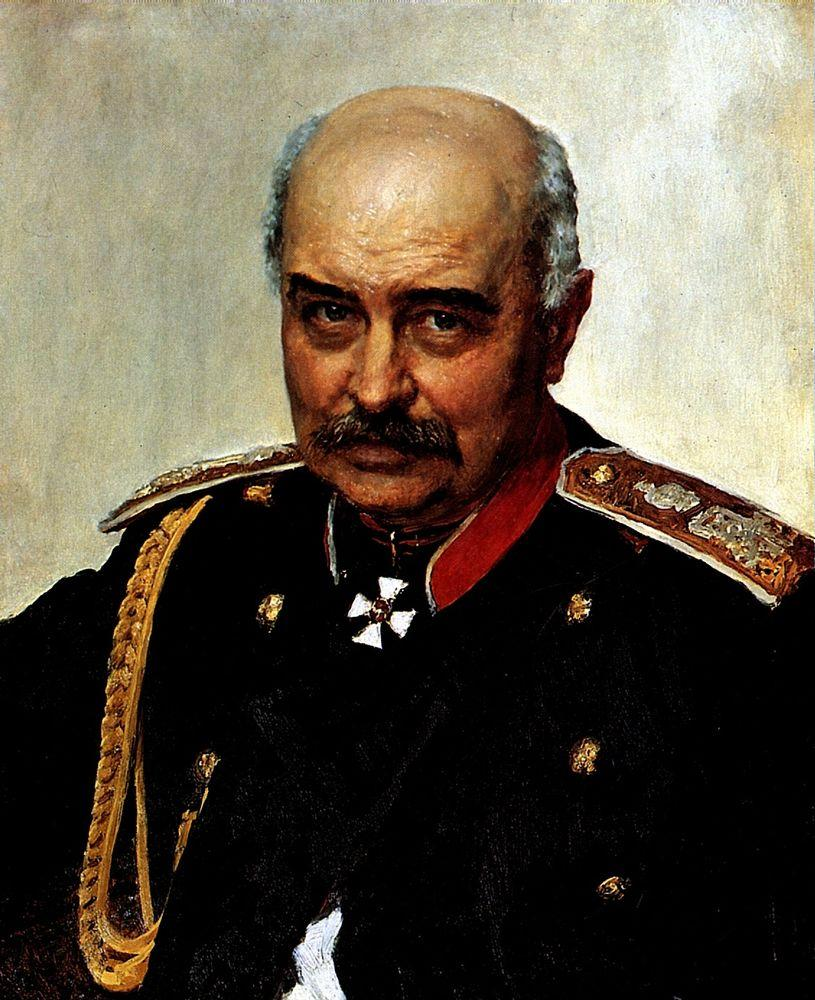
General and military writer Mikhail Dragomirov (1889)

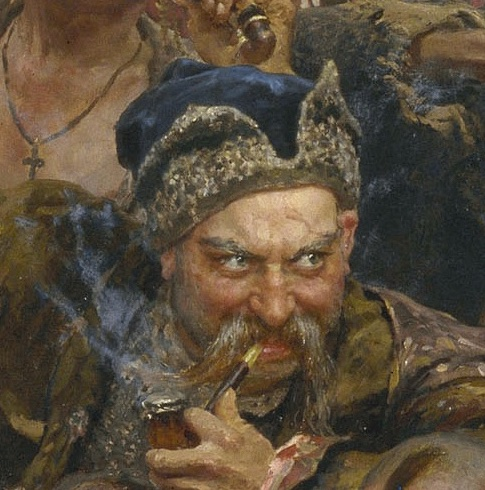
General Dragamirov was also the model for a Cossack leader in "Reply of the Zaporozhian Cossacks"

Repin particularly excelled at portrait painting. He produced more than three hundred portraits in his career. He painted most of the notable political figures, writers and composers of his time. One exception was Dostoevsky, whose mysticism Repin did not appreciate at all. He preceded each portrait with six or seven sketches. He had to persuade a reluctant Tolstoy to be portrayed working in a field with bare feet, as he usually did.

== Drawings and sketches ==
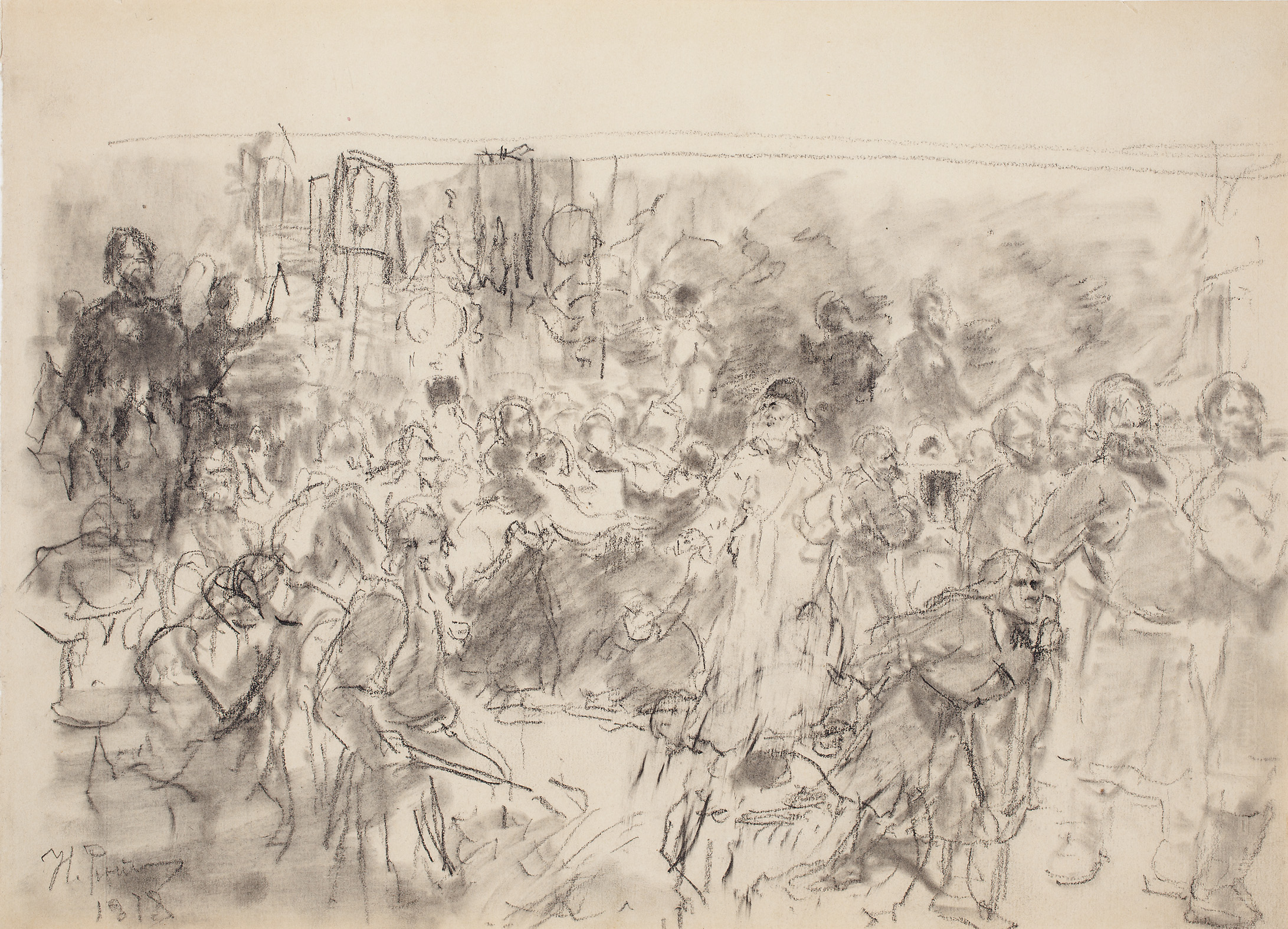
Sketch for Religious Procession in Kursk (1878)

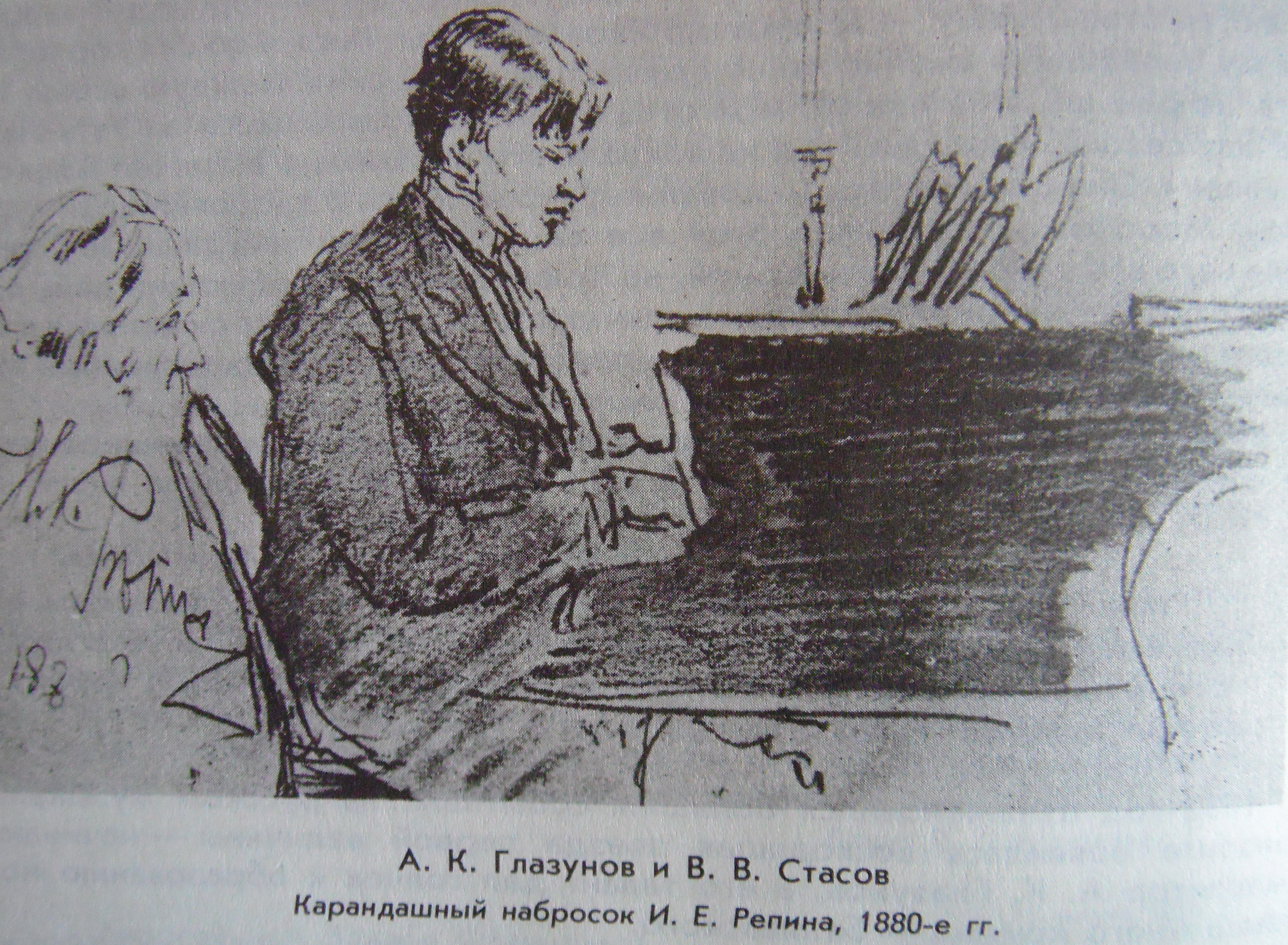
Pencil sketch of the composer Alexander Glazunov (1880s)

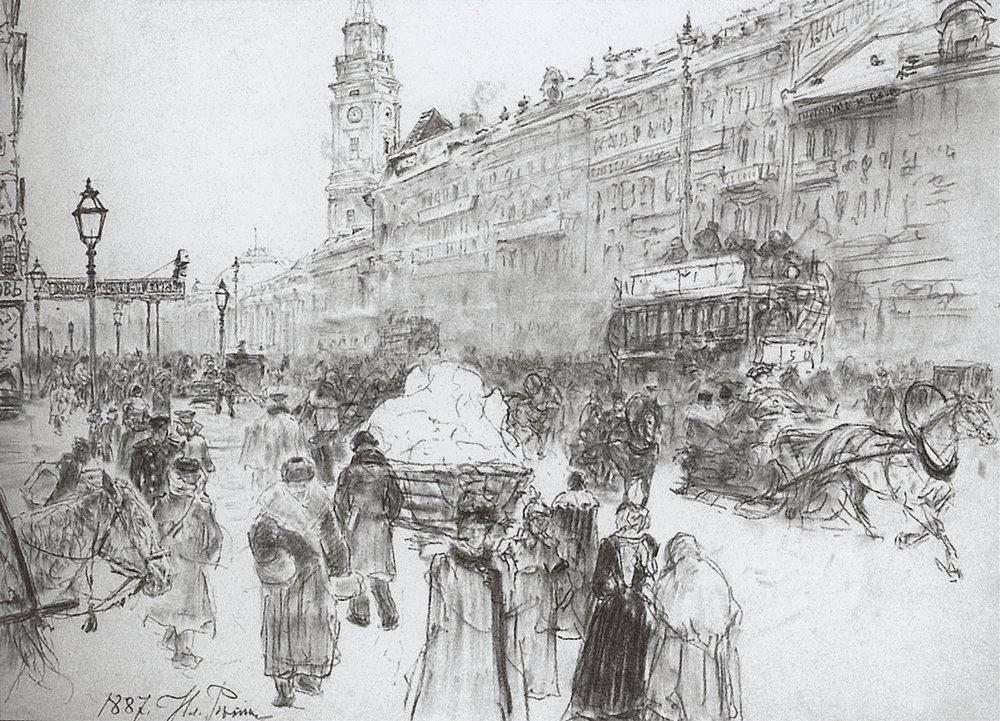
Drawing for Nevsky Prospect in St. Petersburg, graphite pencil on paper (1887)

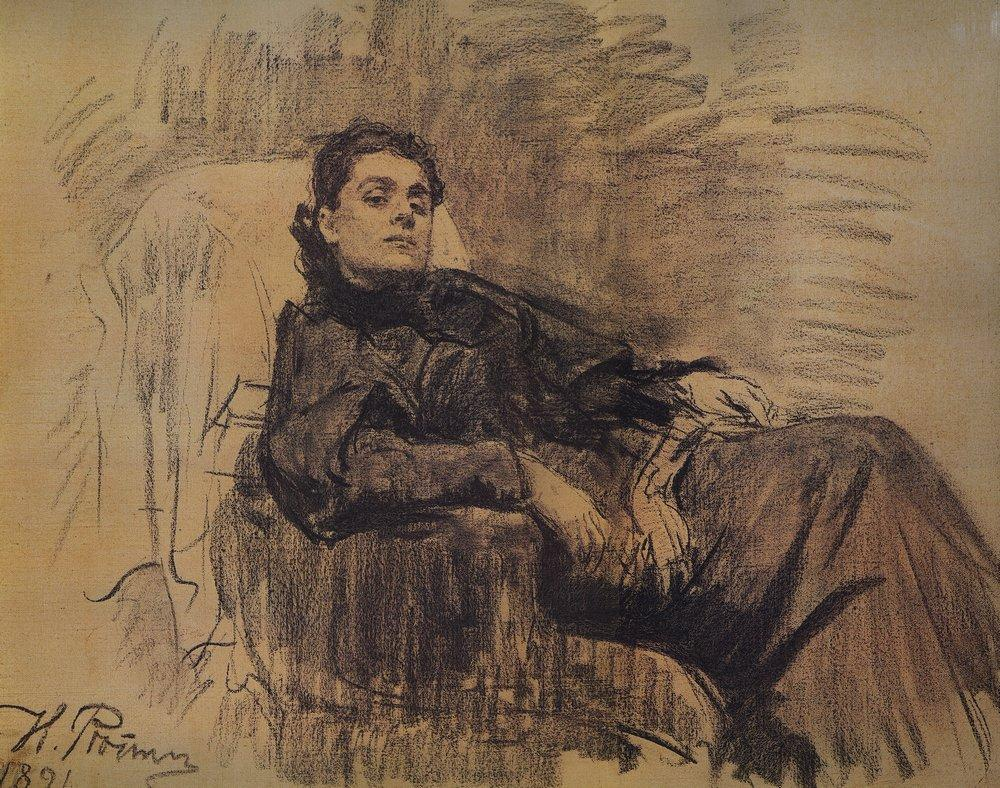
The actress Eleanor Duse by Repin, charcoal on paper (1891)

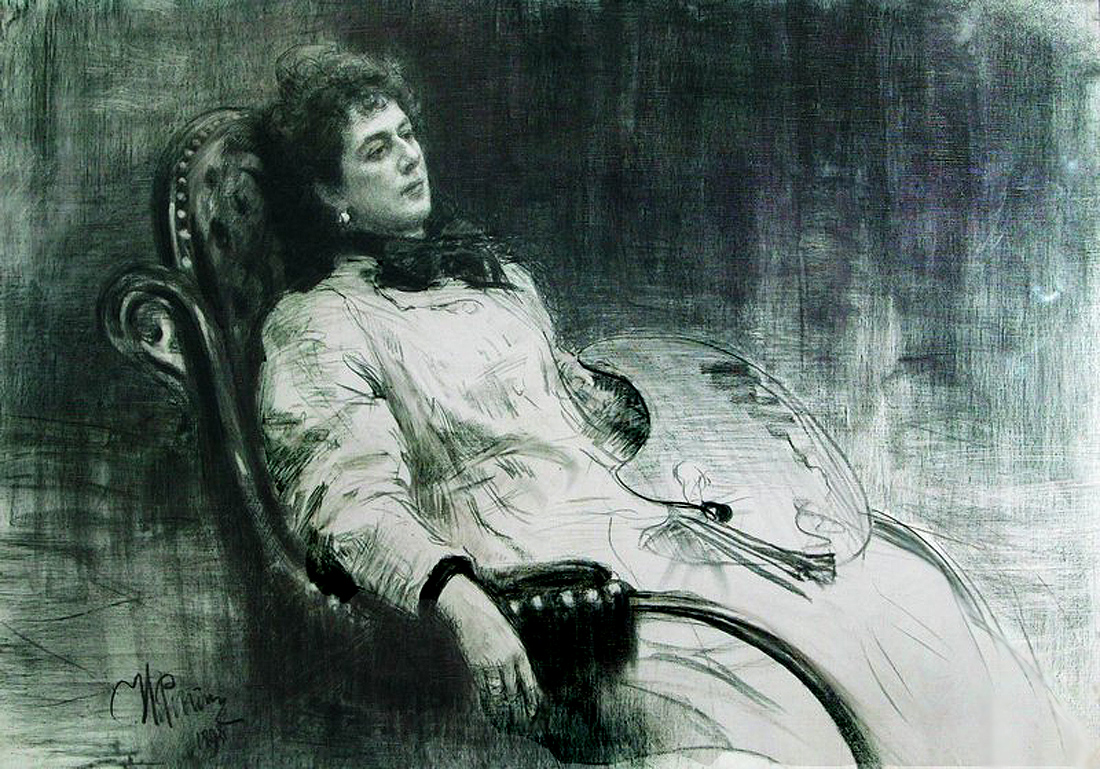
Study for portrait of the art patroness Princess Maria Tenisheva (1896)

With some of his paintings, Repin made one hundred or more preliminary sketches. He began his works with sketches in pencil or charcoal, using lines and cross-hatching. Often he would rub the drawing with his finger or an eraser to get the precise shading that he desired. He sometimes used drawings or paintings of his children to experiment with different points of view. For his large paintings, he made very detailed studies, experimenting with the composition and judging the overall impression.

== Genre painting ==
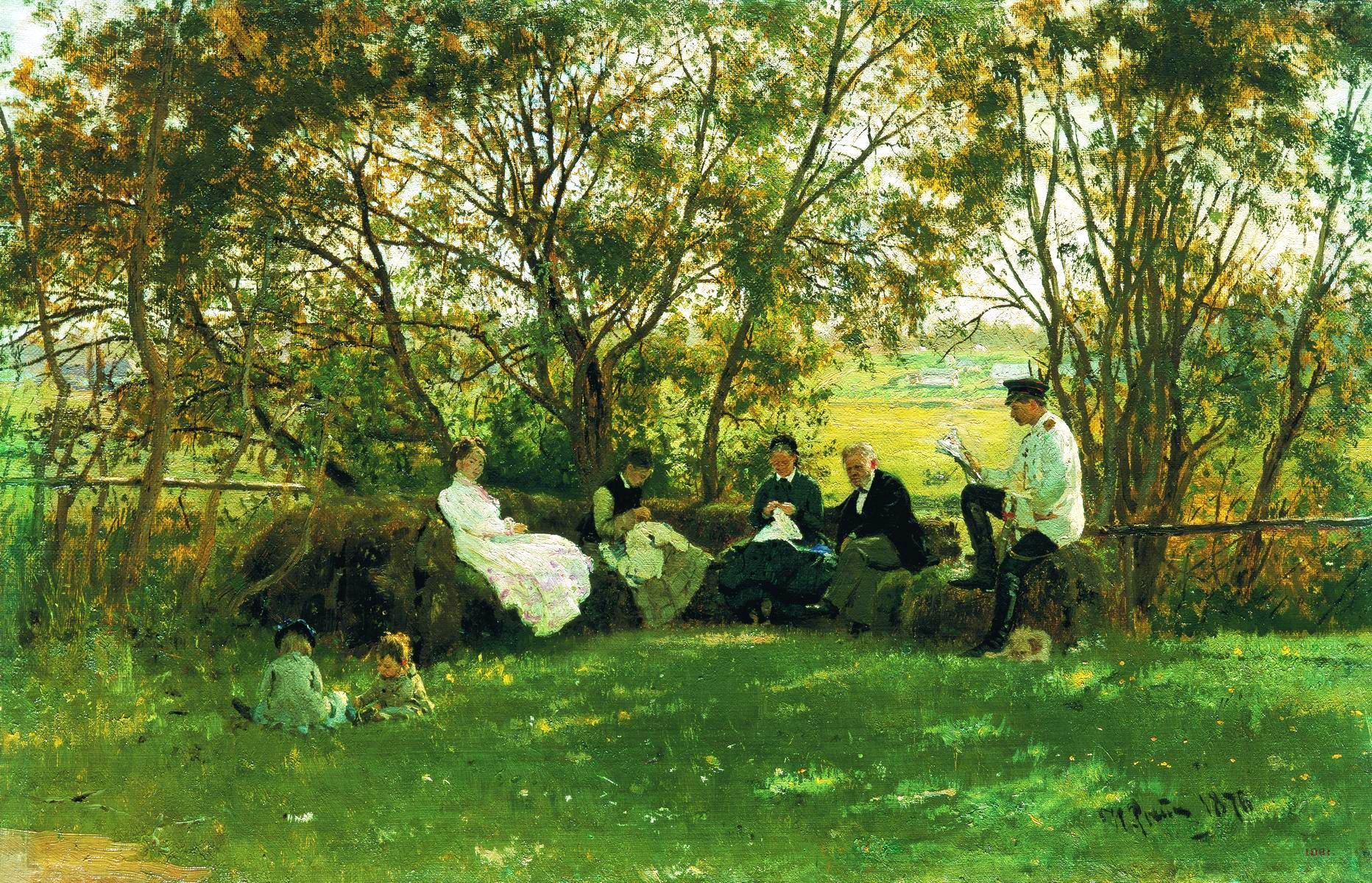
Repin's family on a turf bench (1876)

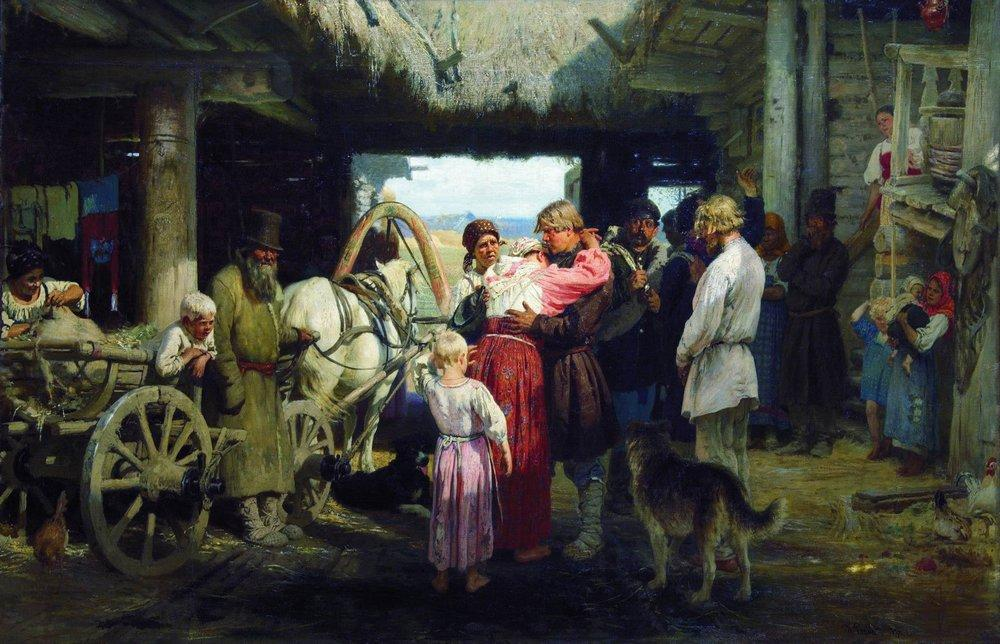
Seeing off a Recruit, State Russian Museum (1879)

No Russian painter of the 19th or 20th century was more skilled at genre painting, portraying scenes of daily life in a sympathetic and perceptive way, giving each character a distinct purpose and personality. His works ranged from domestic scenes to small dramas, such as policemen arresting a young militant for distributing revolutionary tracts.

== Style and technique ==
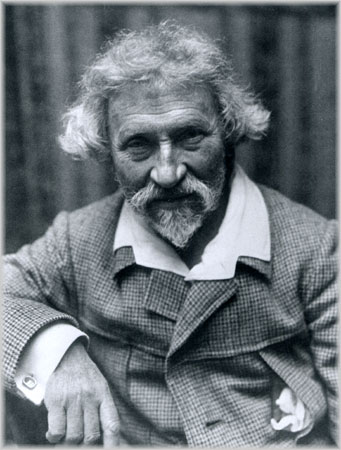
Photograph of Repin by Rentz and Schrader, 1900

Repin persistently searched for new techniques and content to give his work more fullness and depth. Repin had a set of favorite subjects, and a limited circle of people whose portraits he painted. But he had a deep sense of purpose in his aesthetics, and had the great artistic gift to sense the spirit of the age and its reflection in the lives and characters of individuals. Repin's search for truth and for an ideal led him in various directions artistically, influenced by hidden aspects of social and spiritual experiences as well as national culture. Like most Russian realists of his times, Repin often based his works on dramatic conflicts, drawn from contemporary life or history. He also used mythological images with a strong sense of purpose; some of his religious paintings are among his greatest.

His method was the reverse of the general approach of impressionism. He produced works slowly and carefully. They were the result of close and detailed study. He was never satisfied with his works, and often painted multiple versions, years apart. He also changed and adjusted his methods constantly in order to obtain more effective arrangement, grouping and coloristic power. Repin's style of portraiture was unique, but owed something to the influence of Édouard Manet and Diego Velázquez.

== Legacy ==
Repin was the first Russian artist to achieve European fame using specifically Russian themes. His 1873 painting Barge Haulers on the Volga, radically different from previous Russian paintings, made him the leader of a new movement of critical realism in Russian art. He chose nature and character over academic formalism. The triumph of this work was widespread, and it was praised by contemporaries like Vladimir Stasov and Fyodor Dostoyevsky. The paintings show his feeling of personal responsibility for the hard life of the common people and the destiny of Russia.

On 5 August 2009, Google celebrated Ilya Repin's Birthday with a doodle.

In a 2017 VTsIOM poll, Repin ranked third as the most favorite artist of Russians, with 16% of respondents naming him as their favorite, behind Ivan Aivazovsky (27%) and Ivan Shishkin (26%).

== Gallery ==
Paintings

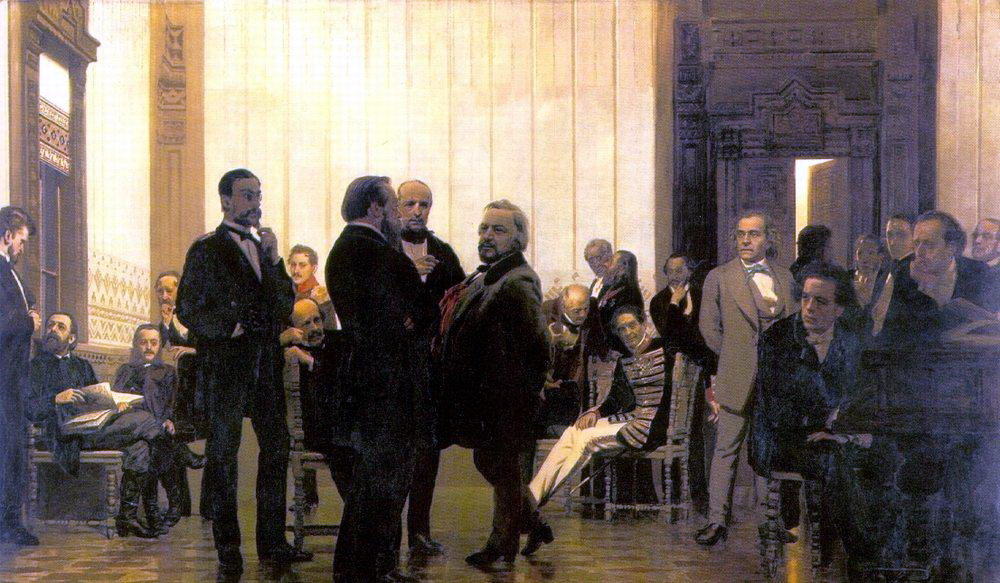
Slavic Composers (1871)

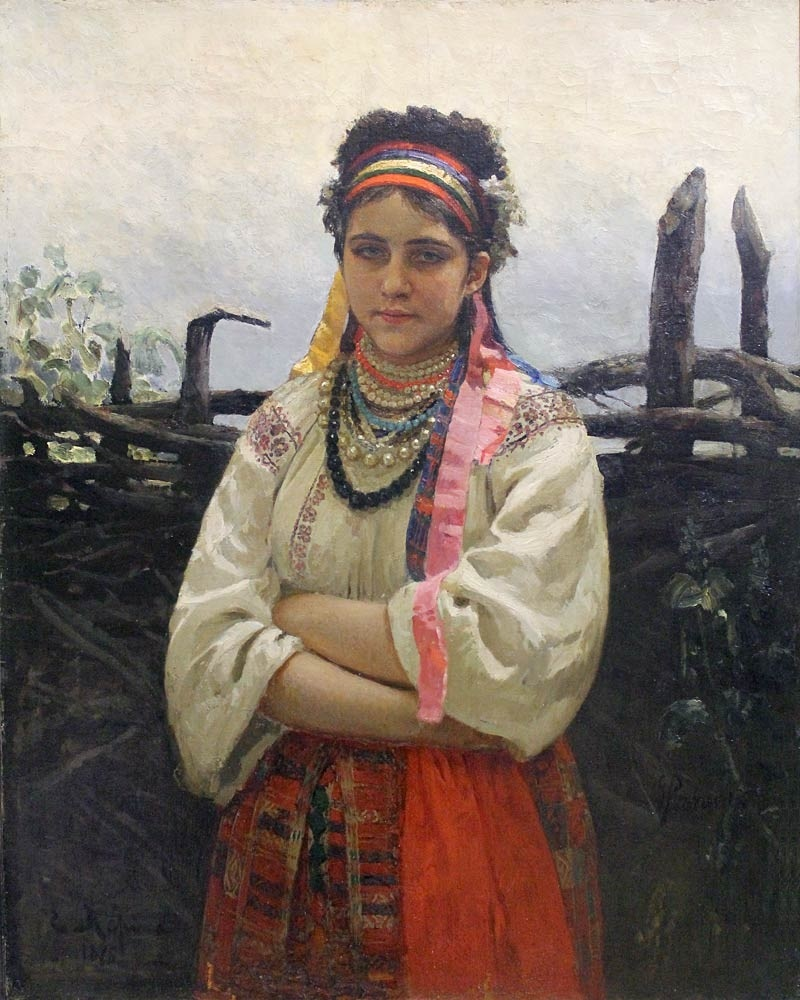
Ukrainian Woman by Repin (1876)

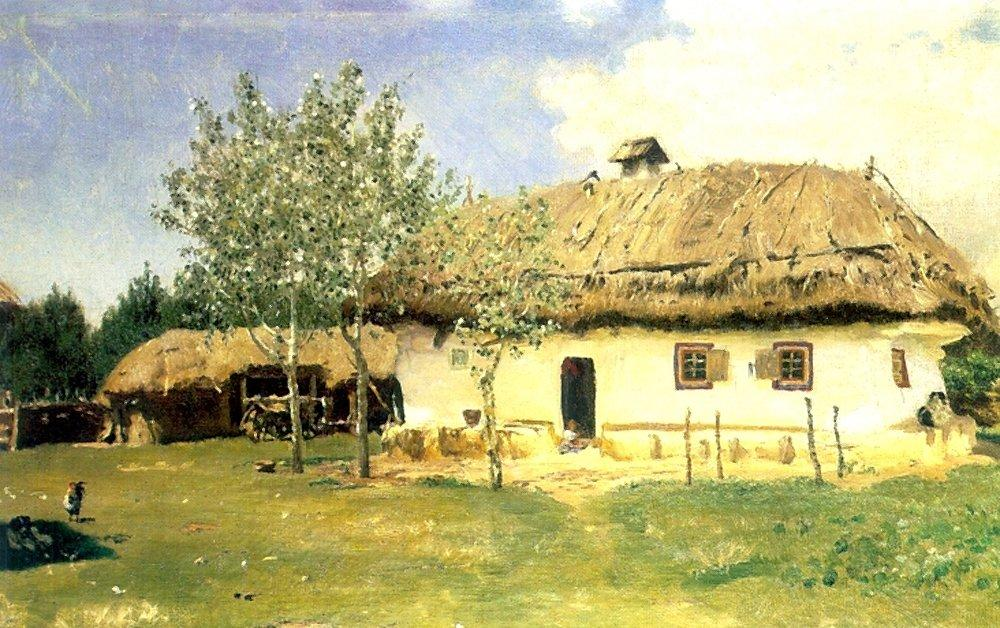
Ukrainian traditional peasant house (1880)

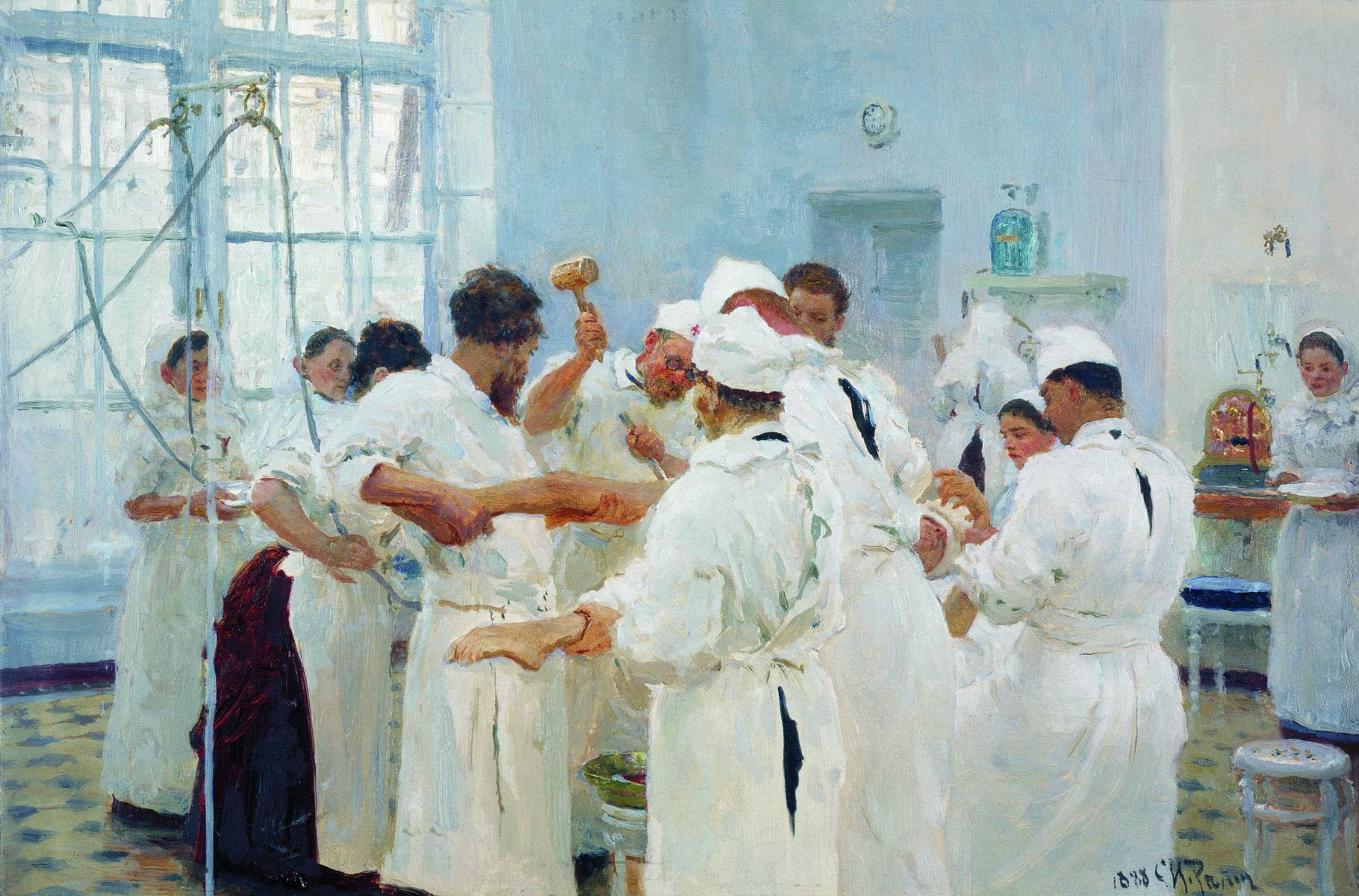
The Surgeon Evgeny Vasilyevich Pavlov in the Operating Theater (1888)

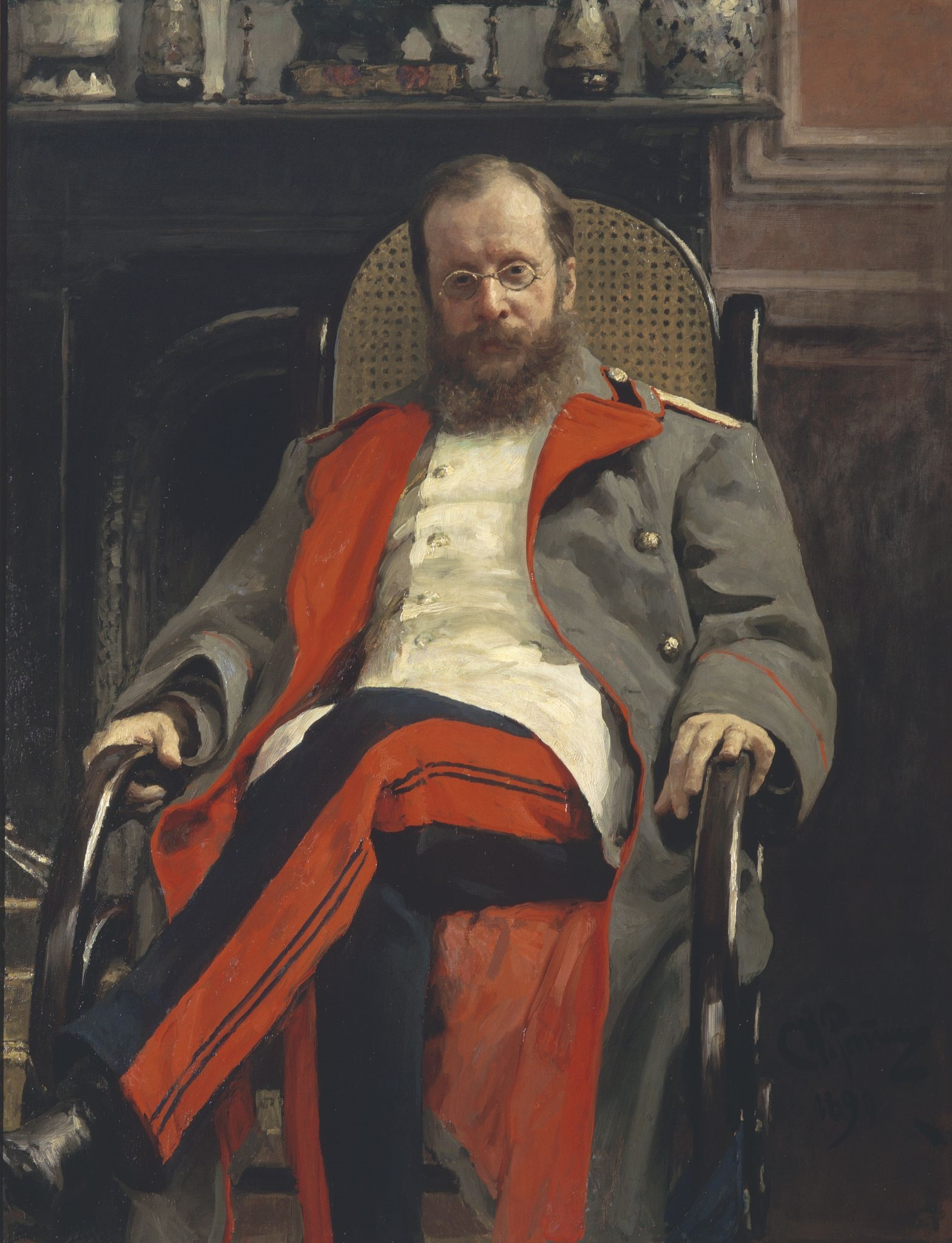
Portrait of Composer César Antonovich Cui (1890)F

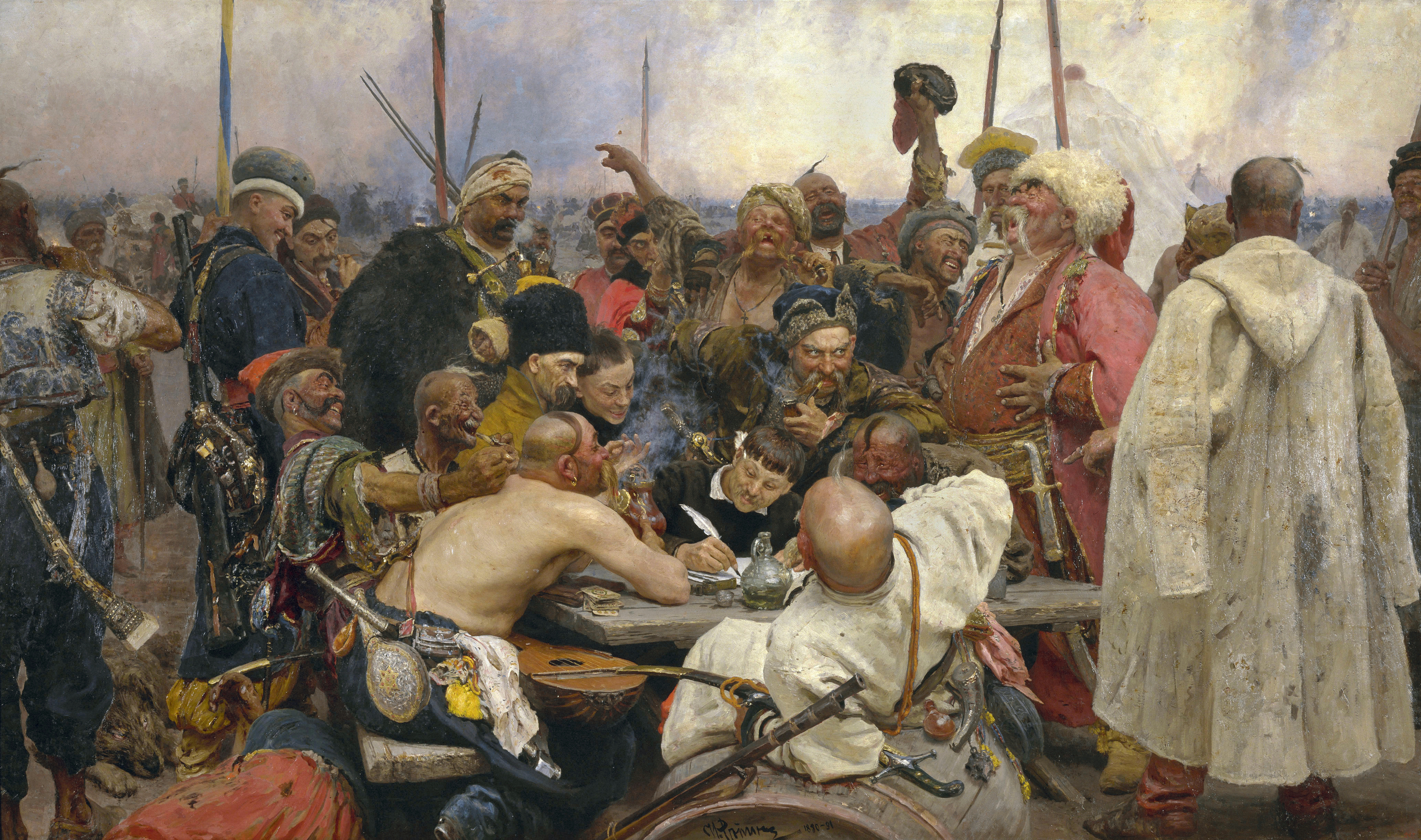
Zaporozhian Cossacks write a letter to the Turkish Sultan (1892, State Russian Museum).

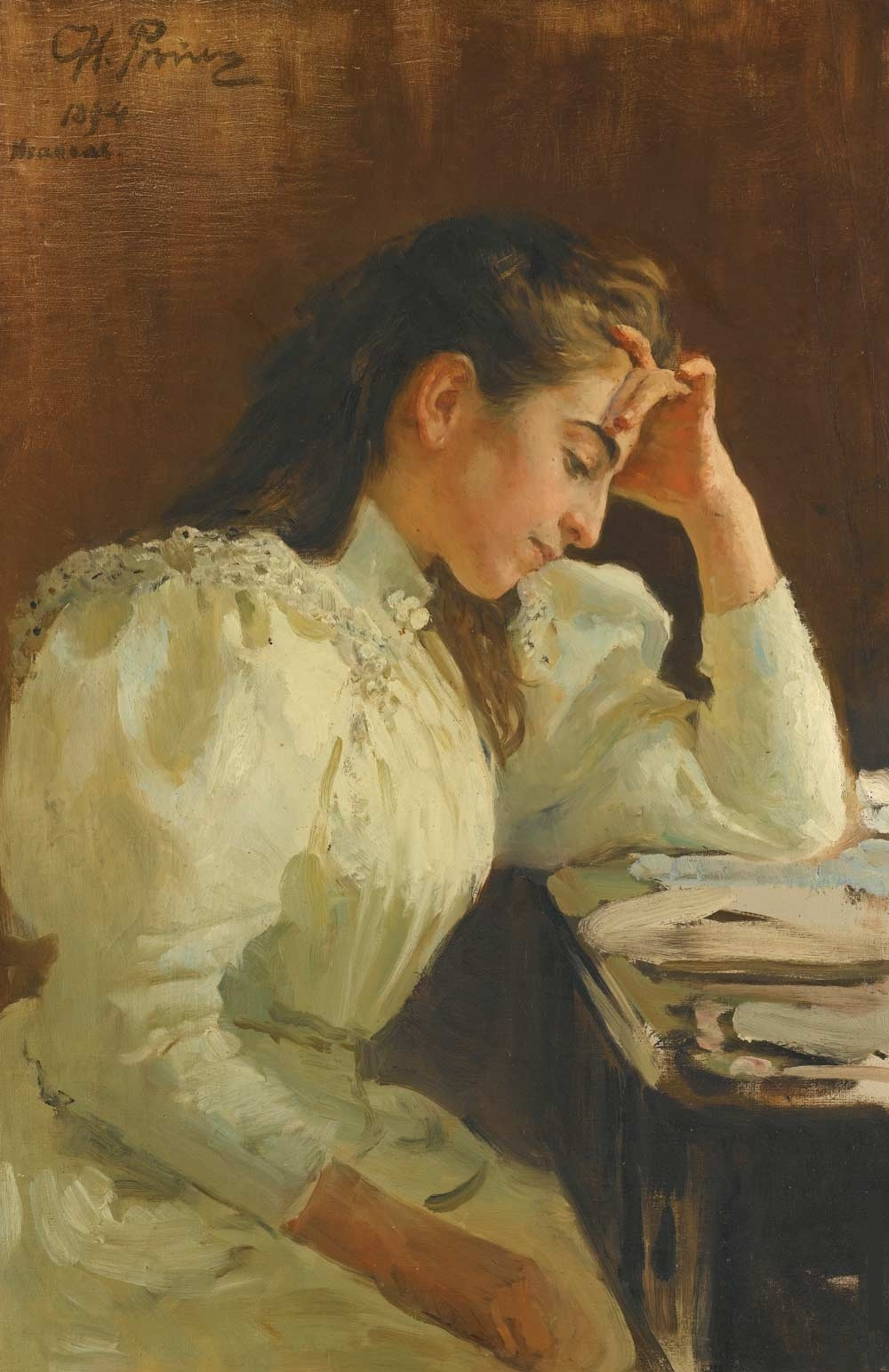
Neapolitan Woman (1894)

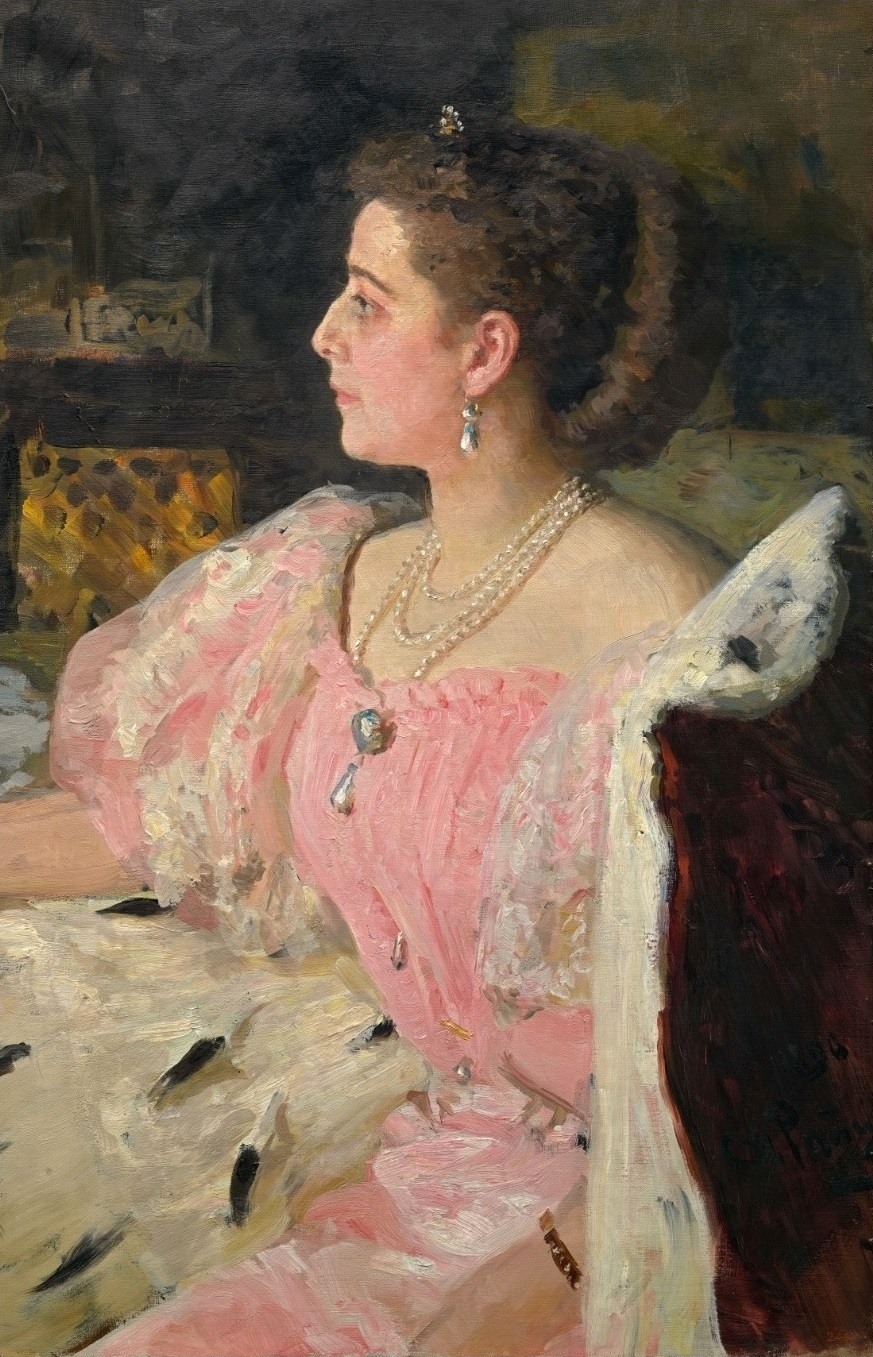
Portrait of Countess Natalia Petrovna Golovina (1896)

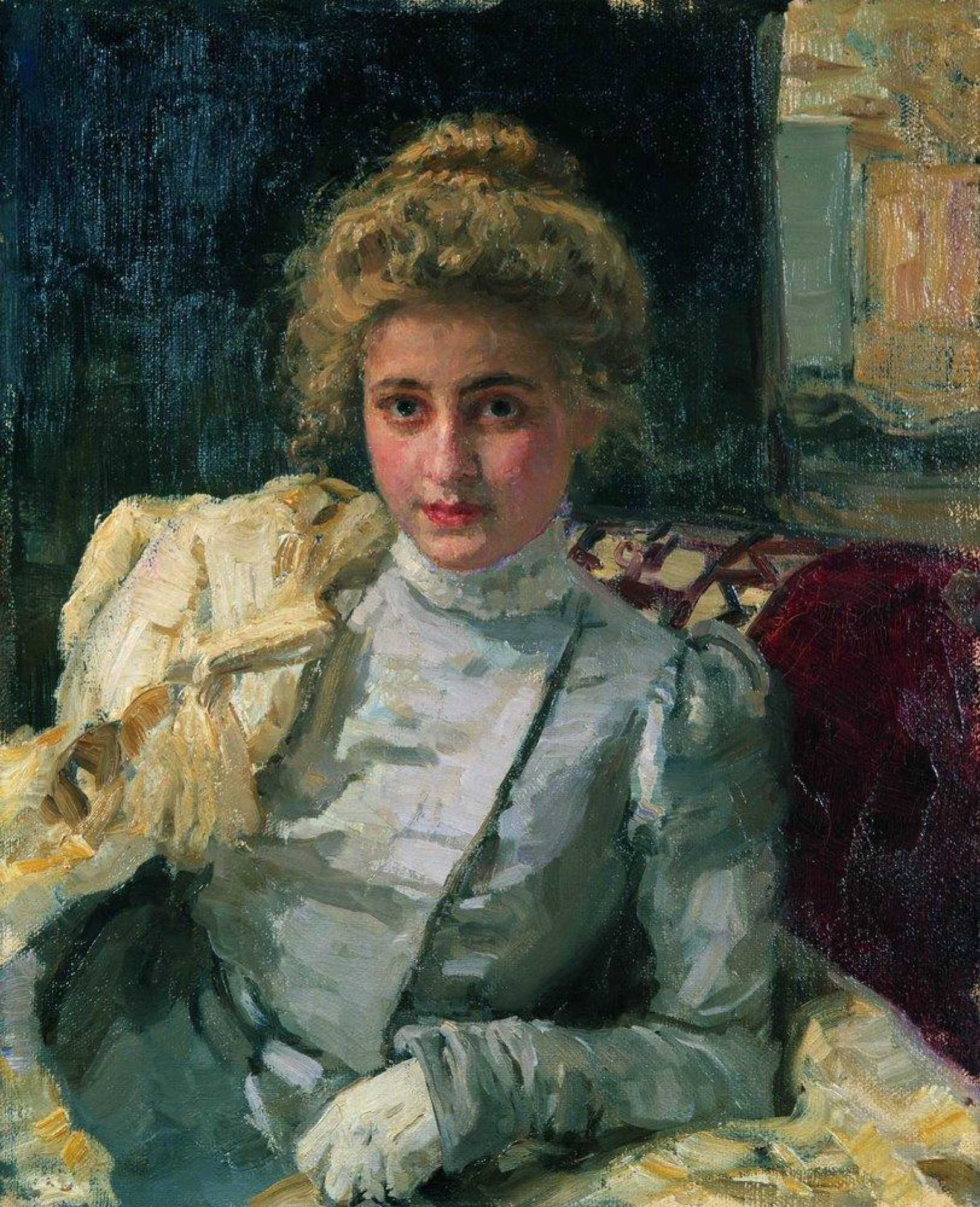
The Blonde Woman (1898, portrait of Tevashova)

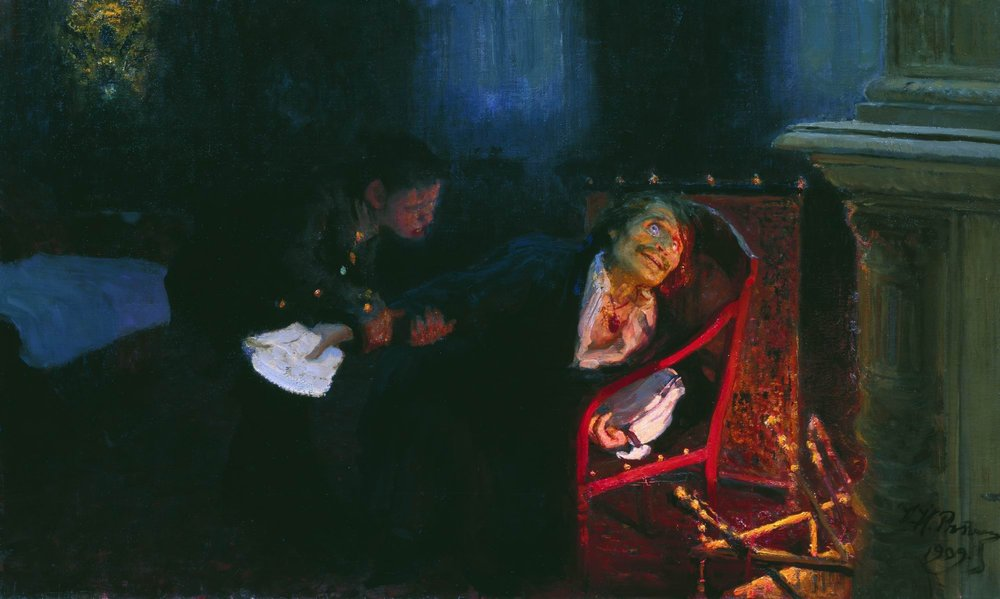
Gogol burning the manuscript of the second part of "Dead Souls" (1909)

== See also ==
- Penates House-Museum of Ilya Repin
