= Six Poems by Marina Tsvetayeva =

1973 song cycle by Dmitri Shostakovich

- Song cycle by Dmitri Shostakovich
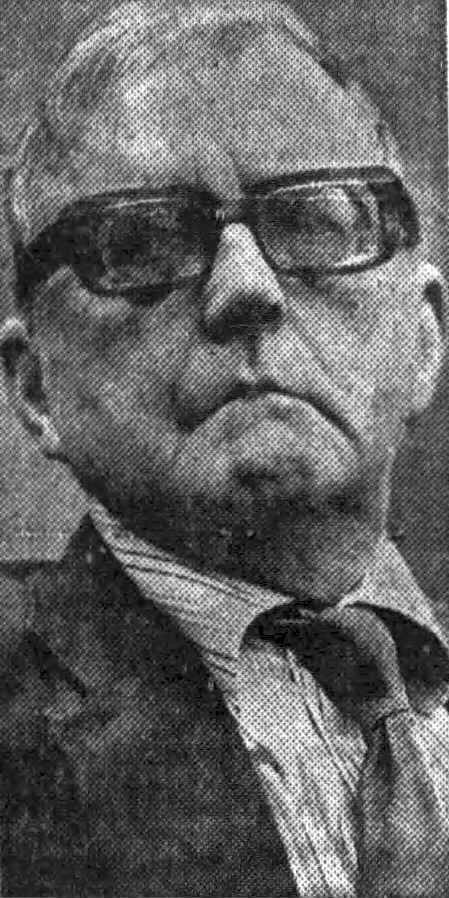
- Shostakovich in June 1973
- Opus: 143
- Text: Marina Tsvetayeva
- Language: Russian
- Composed: July 31, 1973 – August 7, 1973: Pärnu, Estonian SSR
- Dedication: Irina Bogacheva
- Published: 1974
- Publisher: Muzfond; Muzyka; G. Schirmer; Edition Peters; Zen-On; DSCH Publishers
- Duration: c. 20 minutes
- Movements: 6
- Scoring: Contralto and piano or small orchestra

Premiere
- Date: Op. 143: October 30, 1973; Op. 143a: June 15, 1974
- Location: Op. 143: Large Hall of the Leningrad Philharmonia; Leningrad, Russian SFSR; Op. 143a: Large Hall of the Moscow Conservatory; Moscow, Russian SFSR
- Conductor: Op. 143a: Rudolf Barshai
- Performers: Op. 143: Irina Bogacheva (mezzo-soprano); Sofiya Vakman (piano); Op. 143a: Irina Bogacheva (mezzo-soprano); Moscow Chamber Orchestra

The Six Poems by Marina Tsvetayeva: Suite for Contralto and Piano (Russian: Шесть стихотворений Марины Цветаевой: Сюита для контральто и фортепиано, romanized: Shest stikhotvoreniy Mariny Tsvetayevoy: Syuita dlya kontralto i fortepiano), Op. 143 is a song cycle by Dmitri Shostakovich. It was composed in 1973 and originally scored for contralto and piano. In 1974, the composer made an arrangement for contralto and chamber orchestra which he designated as Op. 143a.

Shostakovich first encountered the poetry of Marina Tsvetayeva in 1970 through a setting of her verses by his student, Boris Tishchenko. Eventually, this resulted in the Six Poems by Marina Tsvetayeva, which was composed in Pärnu, Estonian SSR, between July 31 and August 7, 1973. He conceived the work for the voice of Irina Bogacheva, but initially had difficulty in finding her, which caused him to consider engaging either Elena Obraztsova or Tamara Sinyavskaya as alternatives for the world premiere. He finally managed to secure Bogacheva in September. She and her longtime accompanist, Sofiya Vakman, performed the world premiere at the Large Hall of the Leningrad Philharmonia in Leningrad on October 30, 1973. Bogacheva also sang the premiere of the orchestral version of the work on June 15, 1974, with the Moscow Chamber Orchestra conducted by Rudolf Barshai.

Although the early reception of the Six Poems by Marina Tsvetayeva was marred by controversy ensuing from Shostakovich being a signatory to a denunciation of Andrei Sakharov published in late August 1973, the work was generally received positively. It gained the appreciation of Tsvetayeva's sister, Anastasia, who established a correspondence with the composer in 1975.

== Background ==
=== Origins ===
In the late 1960s, Dmitri Shostakovich developed an interest in setting Anna Akhmatova's Requiem to music. However, when his student Boris Tishchenko made his own setting of those verses, Shostakovich declined to further pursue his as he believed that doing so would be seen as an encroachment into his student's work.

A few years later, the interests of Shostakovich and Tishchenko crossed again. In 1970, Shostakovich became acquainted with the poetry of Marina Tsvetayeva through Tishchenko's Three Songs to Verses by Marina Tsvetaeva, which the latter had composed earlier that year. Both music and poetry elicited Shostakovich's approval. He wrote to Tishchenko that he had become very fond of the work and requested a copy of the score. After receiving it, he wrote to the younger composer that he was playing and singing the work every day. Shostakovich soon acquired a collection of Tsvetayeva's poetry, which became part of his daily reading. Sofia Khentova, Shostakovich's official biographer, speculated that Tsvetayeva's character and outlook may have attracted the composer's attention.

The next year, while working on the Fifteenth Symphony and notated among its sketches, Shostakovich composed "Yelabuga Nail", an incomplete and unpublished setting for bass and piano of a poem by Yevgeny Yevtushenko about Tsvetayeva's suicide. Shostakovich was sufficiently pleased with the song that he offered to play it for his friend, the arts critic Isaak Glikman.

=== Composition ===
On July 27, 1973—after travels to Denmark and the United States, where doctors had diagnosed his health problems as terminal—Shostakovich and his wife arrived in Pärnu, Estonian SSR, where they stayed until August 30. There, between July 31 and August 7, he composed his Six Poems by Marina Tsvetayeva. At some point before its composition, Shostakovich heard a television broadcast of a performance by the mezzo-soprano Irina Bogacheva. He felt that her voice approximated best how he envisioned the sound of Tsvetayeva's own: "husky, hefty, occluded in the smoke of homegrown tobacco". The poems he chose to set represented an intersection of themes that had interested his entire life—William Shakespeare, Alexander Pushkin, the dynamics between artist and ruler—and allowed him a vehicle to express his veneration for Akhmatova.

=== Preparations for the premiere ===
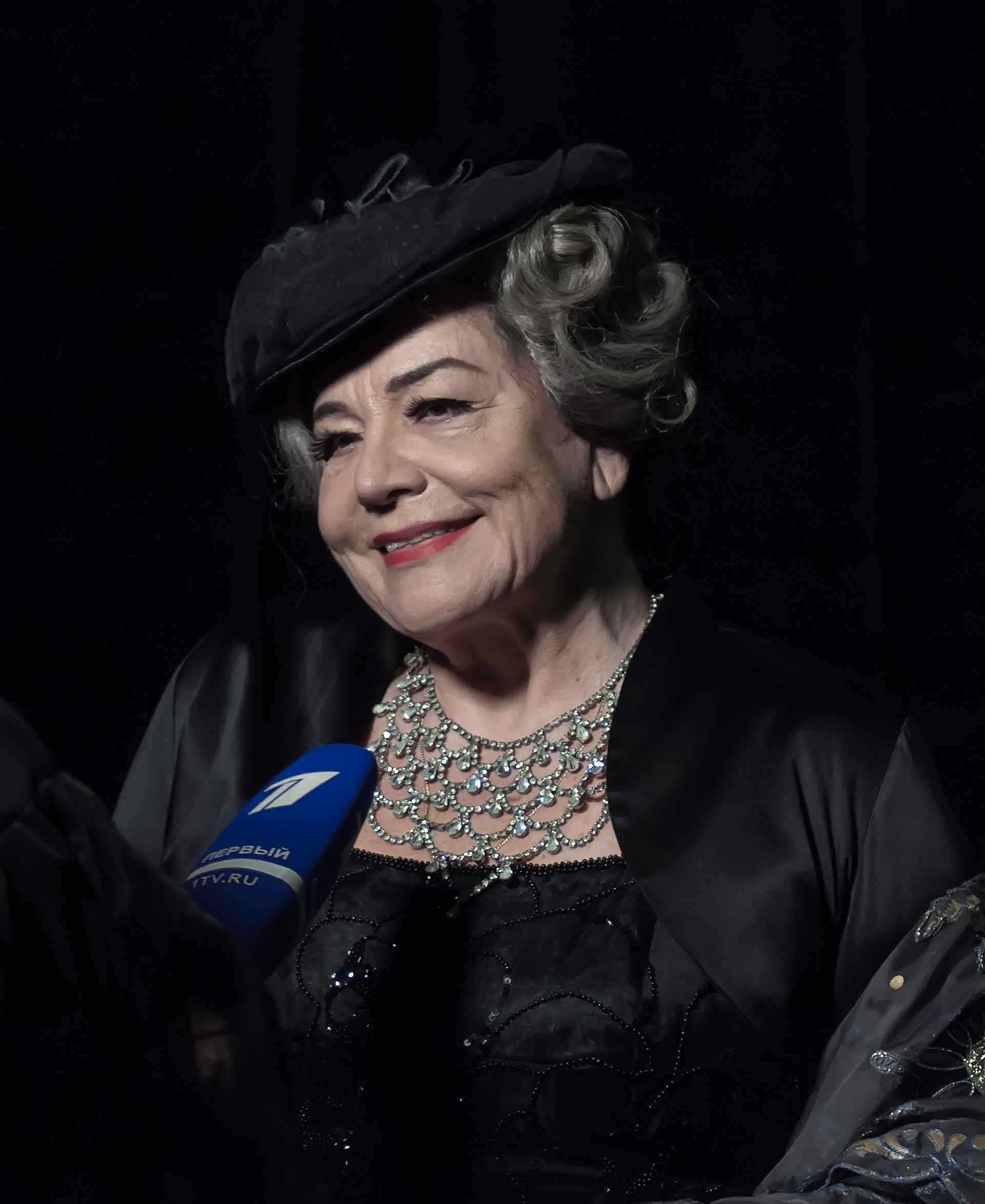
Shostakovich composed his song cycle for Irina Bogacheva (pictured here in 2018)

Despite having been inspired by Bogacheva, Shostakovich initially had trouble informing her about the Six Poems by Marina Tsvetayeva. He called her a number of times from Pärnu, but without answer. On September 11, 1973, he sent her a letter stating that he was eager to acquaint her with his song cycle. "Of course, I dream that you would indulge this suite with your attention", he wrote, "and ask you to sing it". Unbeknownst to him, she was touring around the Soviet Union during this time. Glikman believed that Shostakovich was concerned that she was deliberately avoiding him similarly to how Boris Gmyrya had dodged his request to sing the premiere of the Thirteenth Symphony. Shostakovich contemplated engaging either Elena Obraztsova or Tamara Sinyavskaya to sing the cycle's premiere. The composer went to the extent of sending the latter a copy of the score for study. Nevertheless, he was dissatisfied with both singers, and continued to press for Bogacheva.

Shostakovich also sent a letter to Sofiya Vakman, Bogacheva's longtime accompanist, who replied on September 20 that she and Bogacheva were delighted and honored that he chose them to perform the premiere of the Six Poems by Marina Tsvetayeva. She also said that they were looking forward to preparing it under his supervision when the singer returned from touring.

Bogacheva and Vakman arrived at Shostakovich's home on October 22 to begin rehearsals for the premiere of the Six Poems by Marina Tsvetayeva. The latter recalled being surprised that the composer preferred to sit as far from her and Bogacheva during their performance. Following their initial playthrough, Shostakovich requested to hear it again. Vakman said that while they performed, Shostakovich sat listening and weeping silently. Once they finished, his mood turned cheerful and they began to discuss interpretive points. Bogacheva was concerned that the tessitura of the cycle was too low for her. "I am not a contralto", she told Shostakovich. She requested that he transpose it a half-step up, an idea he considered momentarily before rejecting it by saying that he enjoyed the lower register of her voice, which he believed sounded good. Her suggestion that the cycle would be more structurally effective if the order of the first and last songs were reversed was also rebuffed by the composer. His approach to tempi was more flexible. "Take no notice of [my tempo markings]—I never know if I mark the metronome correctly", he said.

=== Orchestration ===
Shostakovich completed his orchestration of the Six Poems by Marina Tsvetayeva while vacationing in Repino on January 9, 1974. He modified the tempo in the first song, "My Poetry".

== Music ==
The Six Poems by Marina Tsvetayeva, a performance of which typically lasts for approximately 20 minutes, consists of six songs:

Number	Title	Tempo	Notes
1	My Poetry (Russian: Мои cтихи, romanized: Moi stikhi),	Largo ( = 92)	
2	Whence Comes This Tenderness? (Russian: Откуда такая нежность, romanized: Otkuda takaya nezhnost)	Allegretto ( = 120)	
3	Hamlet's Dialogue With his Conscience (Russian: Диалог Гамлета с его совестью, romanized: Dialog Gamleta s ego sovestyu)	Largo ( = 80)	
4	The Poet and the Tsar (Russian: Поэт и царь, romanized: Poet i tsar)	Moderato ( = 144)	Ending marked attacca
5	No, a Drum Was Heard… (Russian: Нет, бил барабан..., romanized: Nyet, bil baraban...)	Allegretto ( = 120) — Meno mosso — Moderato — Maestoso ( = 100) — Allegretto ( = 120)	
6	To Anna Akhmatova (Russian: Анне Ахматовой, romanized: Anne Akhmatovoy)	Largo ( = 112)	Contains allusions to the Cello Concerto No. 2

=== Instrumentation ===
The Op. 143a version of Six Poems by Marina Tsvetayeva is scored for:

Woodwinds
2 Flutes
2 Bassoons
Brass
2 French horns

Percussion
Timpani
Snare drum
Xylophone
Tubular bells
Keyboards
celesta
piano

Voices:
contralto

Strings
1st Violins (5)
2nd Violins (5)
Violas (4)
Cellos (3)
Double basses (2)

=== Manuscripts ===
Holograph sketches and fair copies for both versions of the Six Poems by Marina Tsvetayeva survive and are stored in the Shostakovich family archives. The sketches include an incomplete four-part instrumental fugue based on the theme of "My Poetry" that was ultimately discarded. The handwriting in the rough draft of the vocal and piano score is difficult to read; it evinces having been written in haste. Sketches and fair copies of the vocal and piano score are both written on 14-staff music paper, with notation and words written in dark blue and black inks. The paper itself shows some yellowing, creasing on the bottoms of the pages, and staining. The fair copy of the arrangement for voice and chamber orchestra is written on 24-staff music paper. It bears creases, tears, dog ears, stains, and marks from adhesive tape. Its notation is written with black ink, articulation marks with blue ink, and also has additional markings in red pencil. A typed copy by an unknown person of Tsvetayeva's poems with corrections is included.

== Premieres ==
The world premiere of the Six Poems by Marina Tsvetayeva occurred on October 30, 1973, at the Large Hall of the Leningrad Philharmonia. It was broadcast on television. Hospitalization prevented Shostakovich from attending the concert. As a result, Khentova regarded a subsequent performance at the Glinka Maly Hall on November 12, which the composer attended and also included the world premiere of the String Quartet No. 14, as the song cycle's official premiere. At the Large Hall of the Moscow Conservatory on June 15, 1974, Bogacheva sang the world premiere of the version of the cycle for voice and chamber orchestra. She was accompanied by the Moscow Chamber Orchestra conducted by Rudolf Barshai. She also sang in the premiere recordings of both versions of the work, first with piano on April 5, then chamber orchestra in July 1974. Both recordings were made with the same performers from their respective premieres.

On October 17, 1979, the Six Poems by Marina Tsvetayeva were first performed outside of the Soviet Union at the Purcell Room in London. That performance was sung by contralto Nicola Lanzetter and pianist Stuart Hutchinson. The British premiere of Op. 143a, performed by the mezzo-soprano Patricia Adkins Chiti with the City of London Sinfonia conducted by Michael Bremner, followed on July 4, 1985, at the Barbican Hall in London.

The American premiere of the version for voice and piano occurred on April 16, 1982, at Stockton University in Galloway Township, New Jersey; it was performed by mezzo-soprano Janet Leuchtner and pianist Leonard Klein. On October 19, 1990, the American premiere of the version for voice and chamber orchestra was played at the Performing Arts Center in Concord, Massachusetts. The performers were Patricia Adkins Chiti and the Concord Orchestra conducted by Richard Pittman.

== Publication ==
The original version of the Six Poems by Marina Tsvetayeva was first published by Muzfond in a collotype edition in 1974. This was followed by editions of both versions of the work from Muzyka, G. Schirmer, Edition Peters, Zen-On, and DSCH Publishers.

== Reception ==
Tishchenko, who had attended the world premiere of the Six Poems by Marina Tsvetayeva in Leningrad reported to Shostakovich that the audience received the work very warmly. Glikman wrote to Shostakovich that he felt upon listening to the music as if Tsvetayeva herself was singing through Bogacheva, whose performance he described as "expressive, vibrant, and lofty". Bogacheva and Vakman each inscribed a copy of the concert program with messages of gratitude and encouragement to Shostakovich. "Dear, dear Dmitri Dmitriyevich!", the latter wrote. "All I can send you is great reverence, love, and gratitude for the opportunity to perform your music". Shostakovich dedicated the work to Bogacheva, to whom he presented a manuscript copy that inscribed his deepest gratitude for her "magnificent performance".

Shostakovich invited his friend, the writer Marietta Shaginyan, to attend the Moscow premiere of the song cycle on December 27, 1973. On December 29, her review of the concert was published in Izvestia:

The impression of cyclical unity, wholeness... conquers the listener... And here is the incredible thing: when you reread these poems in the program before the concert, you wonder—why did Shostakovich set them? What do they share in common? Where is the connection? But then the genius of music puts the bow to the strings, makes the voice ring out, strews the first handful of notes from the piano keys—and you are spellbound, captivated, astounded by the profound interpretation of the poetic word, by the sorcery of music, and for the first time the poem reveals to you the entirety of its meaning, each one bound to the other, and everything becomes one.

Appreciation of the Six Poems by Marina Tsvetayeva was mitigated by a controversy that ensued shortly after its completion. In late August, Shostakovich was among the signatories of an open letter published in the media, entitled "He Disgraces the Calling of Citizen", that denounced Andrei Sakharov. This drew an angry response from Lydia Chukovskaya—whose nephew was married to Shostakovich's daughter, Galina—that was disseminated in samizdat and in Western media. She excoriated Shostakovich's actions as demonstrating "irrefutably that the Pushkinian question has been resolved forever: genius and villainy are compatible". Thereafter, Shostakovich was attacked in private letters by friends and colleagues, while being shunned in public by others.

Krzysztof Meyer, who befriended Shostakovich in his later years, struggled to tactfully express his dislike of the Six Poems by Marina Tsvetayeva to the composer during a meeting at his home in 1974. Upon hearing a private tape recording of the world premiere with Bogacheva and Vakman, Meyer recalled that the work seemed to him "somehow arid, much less convincing than his previous song cycles". He also found fault with Bogacheva's voice, which he found "not very beautiful" and fallible in intonation. Elsewhere, he described the music as "markedly intellectual and ascetic", and likened it to Shostakovich's Violin Sonata.

=== Personal connection to Tsvetayeva ===
Tsvetayeva's sister, Anastasia, learned of the song cycle and its success. Unable to meet Shostakovich because of her physical infirmity, she wrote to him in January 1975; relying on Lidiya Ivanova Urlova, the widow of the conductor Konstantin Ivanov, as an intermediary. Through her, Anastasia related that despite the circumstances of her life, which made it difficult for her to listen to modern music—especially by Shostakovich—she was very touched that he set her sister's poems to music. Anastasia sent to him a copy of her memoirs. Their correspondence continued, in the course of which she sent the composer a copy of one of her unpublished short stories, "Tale of a Moscow Bell-Ringer", based on the life of Konstantin Saradzhev.

In July 1975, Shostakovich read the memoirs of Tsvetayeva's daughter, Ariadna Efron.
