= Sofia Vakman =

Soviet and Russian pianist (1911–2000)

- Софья Вакман
- Born: Sofia Borisovna Bentsionovna; July 12, 1911; Uman, Kiev Governorate, Russian Empire
- Died: August 12, 2000 (aged 89); Saint Petersburg, Russia
- Education: Kiev Conservatory; Leningrad Conservatory
- Occupations: Pianist; Teacher
- Organizations: Leningrad Philharmonia; Leningrad Conservatory; All-Russian Touring and Concert Association
- Spouse: Eduard Grikurov (m. 1934; died 1982)
- Awards: For Labor Valor (1945); For the Defense of Leningrad (1946); Veteran of Labor (1984); Order of the Badge of Honor (1987)

Sofia Borisovna Vakman (Note: Russian: Софья Борисовна (Бенционовна) Вакман) (née Bentsionovna; July 12, 1911 (Note: Old Style: June 29, 1911) – August 12, 2000) was a Soviet and Russian pianist and teacher.

== Biography ==
=== Early life ===
Vakman was born in Uman, Kiev Governorate, Russian Empire, on July 12, 1911. She began music studies in 1914. In 1921, she transferred to the children's department of the Kiev Conservatory. There she enrolled in the piano classes of Konstantin Mikhailov, with whom she studied until 1927. Vakman continued her middle and high school education alongside her musical studies.

A visit to Leningrad, where her older sister lived, led to Vakman becoming enamored with the city; a short time later, she moved there with the rest of her family. She aspired to enroll in the Leningrad Conservatory, which she did in 1928. Unable to obtain a position in the piano class of Leonid Nikolayev, her first choice, she instead became a pupil of Samary Savshinsky. After graduation in 1932, she continued post-graduate studies with him until 1935. She also began to work as a chamber music partner and accompanist, in the course of which she played with Miron Polyakin and Daniil Shafran.

=== Maturity ===
Illness prevented Vakman from pursuing a career as a soloist. After swimming at a lake in 1934, she contracted a skin disorder which endured for several years, and caused her fingers to feel pain upon touch. As a result, she decided to focus on chamber music and accompaniment.

In 1935, Vakman was hired by the Leningrad Philharmonia. Operation Barbarossa, the invasion of Russia by Nazi Germany, forced her and her husband to relocate to Chkalov (now Orenburg), where they joined MALEGOT. From there, she was dispatched to entertain soldiers at the front, where she quickly learned to play accordion. In Chkalov, she played at a local movie theatre, where one of her partners was the cellist Leopold Rostropovich. After his death, Vakman supported his son, Mstislav, by playing with him in cello and piano recitals. The younger Rostropovich developed an infatuation with Vakman and resolved to study cello harder to impress her. He preserved the wrapper from a candy she gave him as a keepsake for the rest of his life.

After the war, Vakman returned to Leningrad. In 1944, she worked briefly with the Leningrad State Stage Association, before resuming work with the Leningrad Philharmonia that same year. She left in 1957 to join the All-Russian Touring and Concert Association. From the 1950s through the 1970s, Vakman performed across the Soviet Union, Eastern Bloc, Europe, the United States, and Latin America. She also was a member of Soviet cultural delegations that were dispatched internationally. However, her energies were primarily directed into teaching after being hired by the Leningrad Conservatory in 1946. She rose through its ranks until attaining the position of professor of chamber music and accompaniment in 1989, a title she held until her death.

=== Later years and death ===
One of her most important and longstanding artistic collaborations began in the late 1960s, when she became accompanist to the mezzo-soprano Irina Bogacheva. Together they toured internationally and played a wide repertoire. In 1973, they performed the world premiere of Dmitri Shostakovich's Six Poems by Marina Tsvetayeva.

Vakman's final public concert occurred on November 12, 1994, at the Glinka Hall of the Saint Petersburg Philharmonia. She died in Saint Petersburg on August 12, 2000.

== Personal life ==
Vakman was rumored to have been courted during the 1930s by the conductors Nikolai Rabinovich and Eduard Grikurov. She ultimately married the latter, with whom she remained until his death in 1982. She was the répétiteur for his 1945 production of Wolfgang Amadeus Mozart's The Magic Flute.

== Awards ==
- For Labor Valor (1945)
- For the Defense of Leningrad (1946)
- Veteran of Labor (1984)
- Order of the Badge of Honor (1987)
