= Op. 141 =

In music, Op. 141 stands for Opus number 141. Compositions that are assigned this number include:

- Schumann – 4 doppelchörige Gesänge (partsongs)
- Shostakovich – Symphony No. 15
- Strauss II – Wellen und Wogen
