= Irina Bogacheva =

Irina Bogacheva may refer to:

- Irina Bogacheva (athlete) (born 1961), Kyrgyzstani long-distance runner
- Irina Bogacheva (mezzo-soprano) (1939–2019), Russian mezzo-soprano
