= Penaty Memorial Estate =

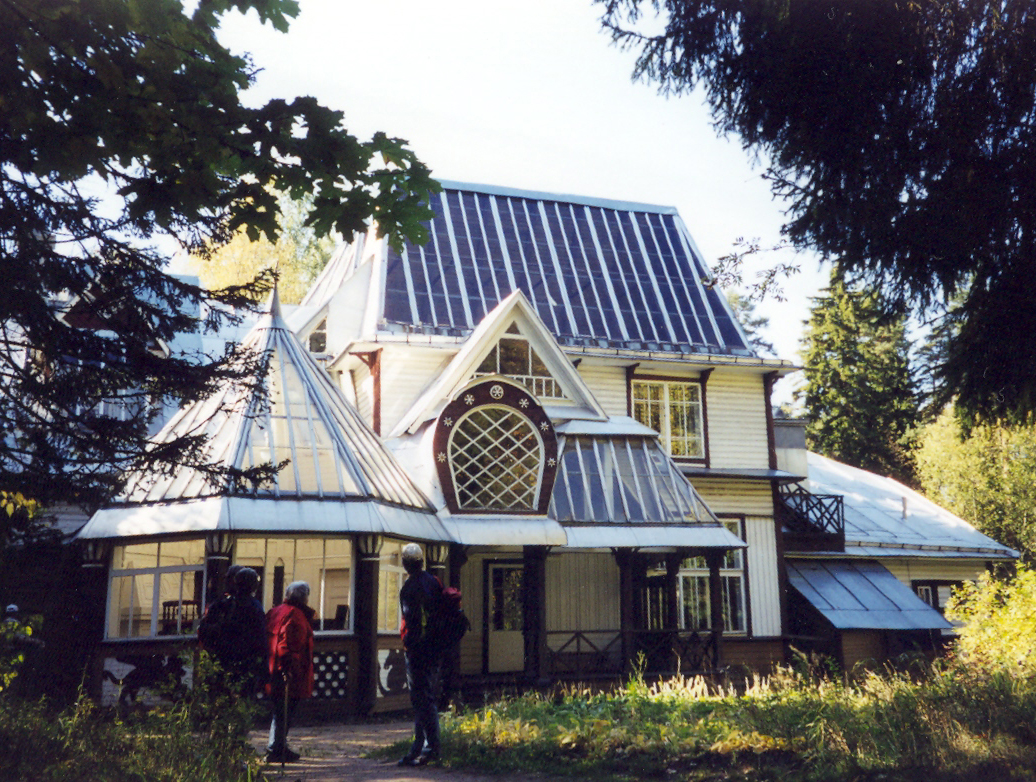
Penaty Memorial Estate, Repino, Saint Petersburg, Russia

The Penaty ('The Penates') Memorial Estate on the Karelian Isthmus near Saint Petersburg, Russia was the home of the painter Ilya Repin from 1899 until his death in 1930, where he painted many of his most notable works. His grave is found there. Penaty is Russian for Penates.

During the time he lived there, the house was located in Kuokkala, Finland. Repin strongly disliked the Soviet government, and decided to settle permanently in Finland. He died in 1930. In 1939, during the Winter War, the town of Kuokkala and the estate were occupied by the Soviets. After the Continuation War Kuokkala was renamed Repino in his honor. The house and gardens were badly damaged during the war, but were restored. The estate is now part of the Historic Centre of Saint Petersburg and Related Groups of Monuments UNESCO World Heritage Site.

== History ==
In 1898 Repin was a professor at the Academy of Fine Arts in Saint Petersburg and rector from 1898 to 1900, and had already earned fame and a good income from his art. In 1899 Repin bought a parcel of land in the small town of Kuokkala, Finland, and began to design and build his own house. He had chosen a site close enough to commute to the Academy Petersburg, but also close to countryside, where he could find calm. The house contained his studio, bedroom, his office, a salon and a dining room.

Repin took the name "Penaty" from the ancient Roman house deities, the Penates. Repin died on 29 September 1930. The house was badly damaged during Continuation War. In 1944, Kuokkala was detached from Finland and attached to the Soviet Union, and the Soviet government renamed the municipality "Repino" in his honour.

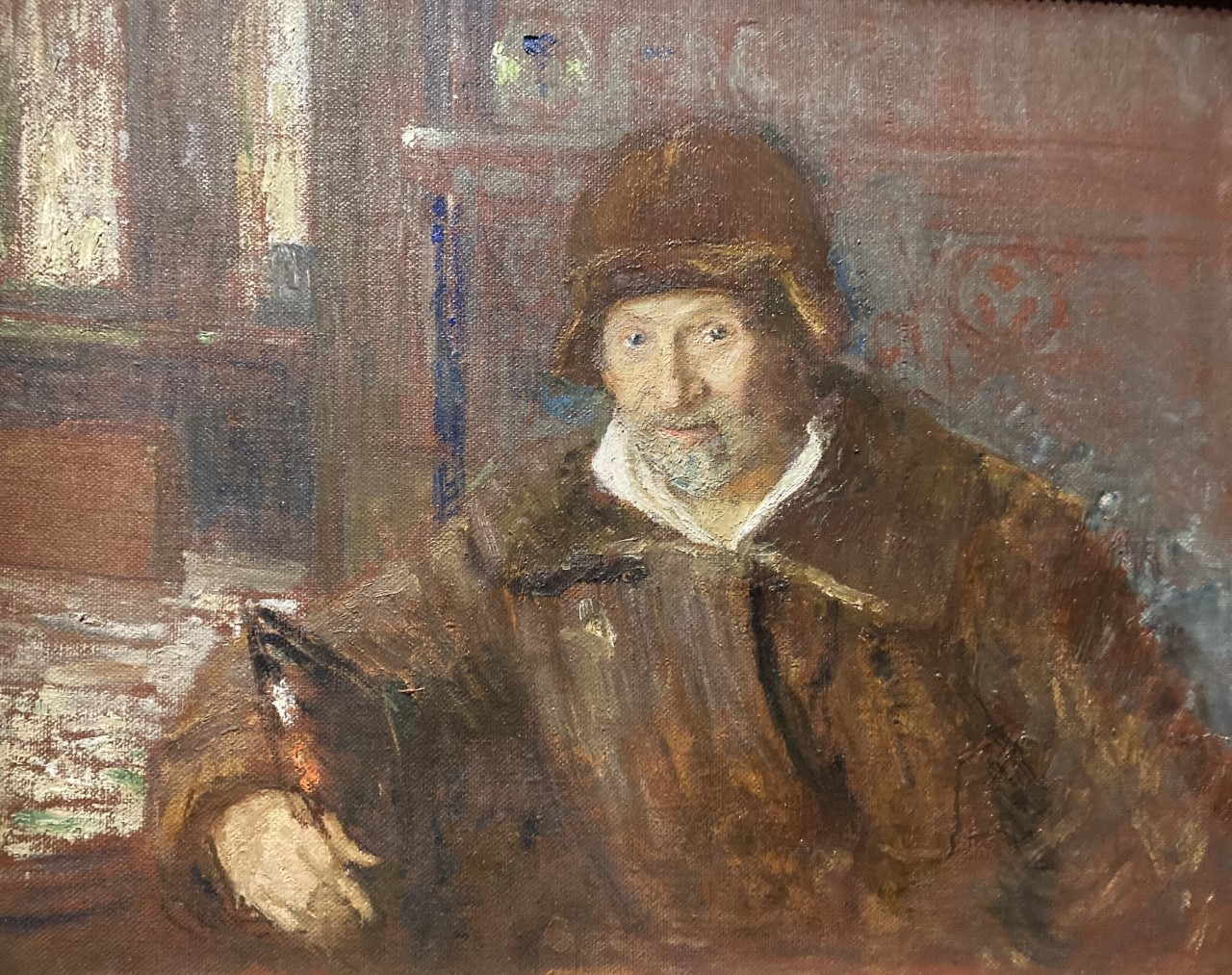
Self-portrait of Repin at Penaty estate (1920)

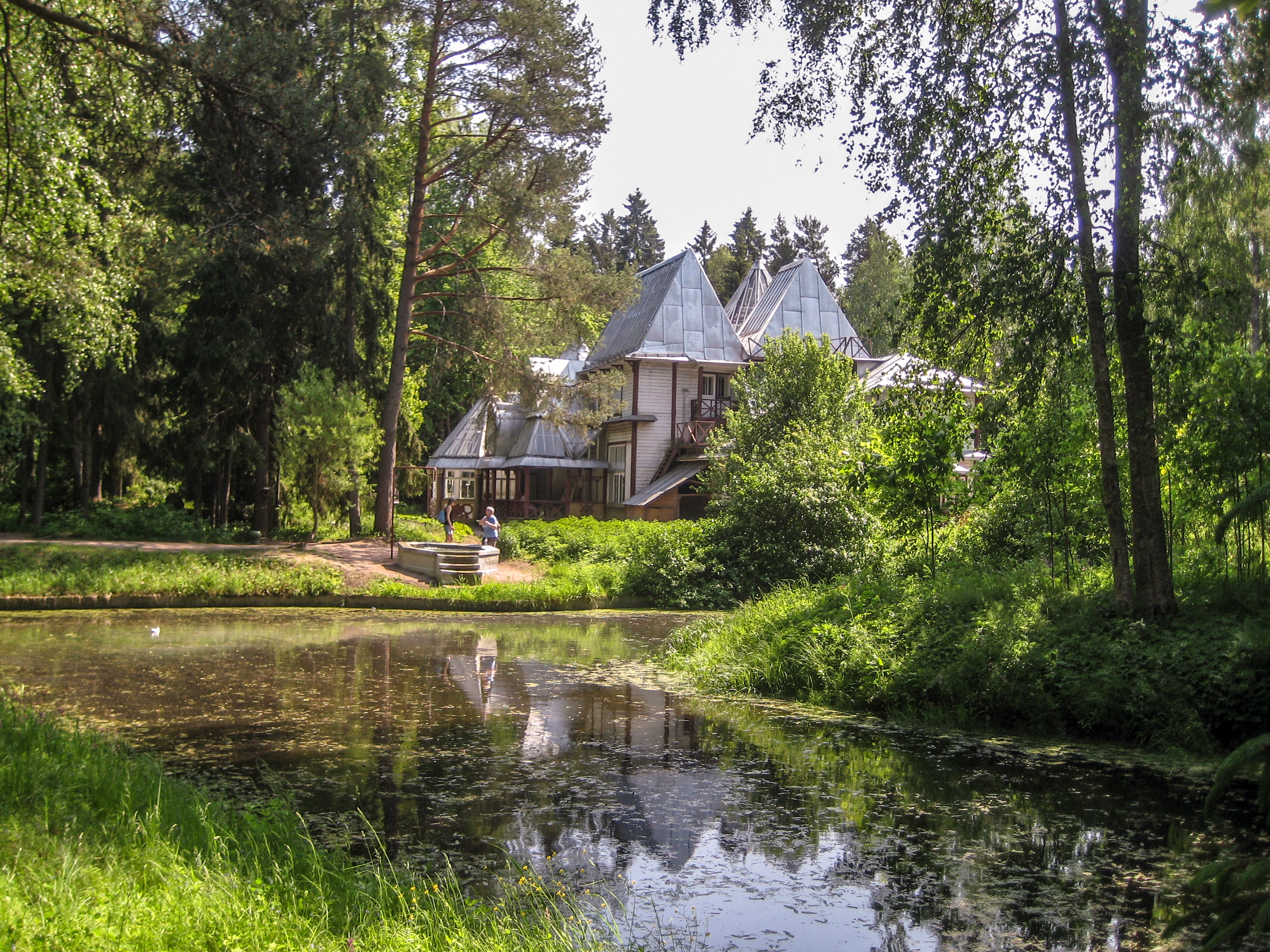
Gardens of the Penaty Memorial Estate

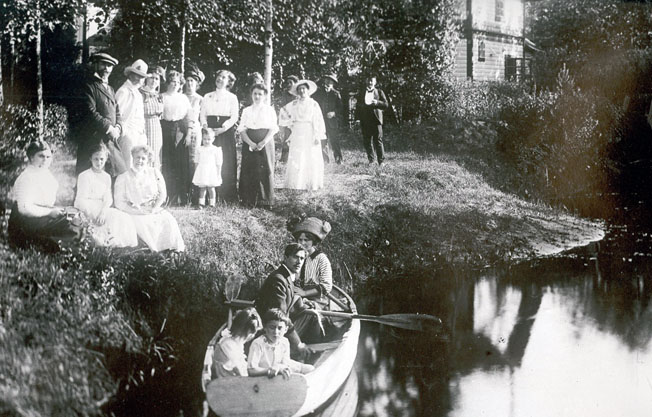
Repin hosts guests at Penaty (1912)

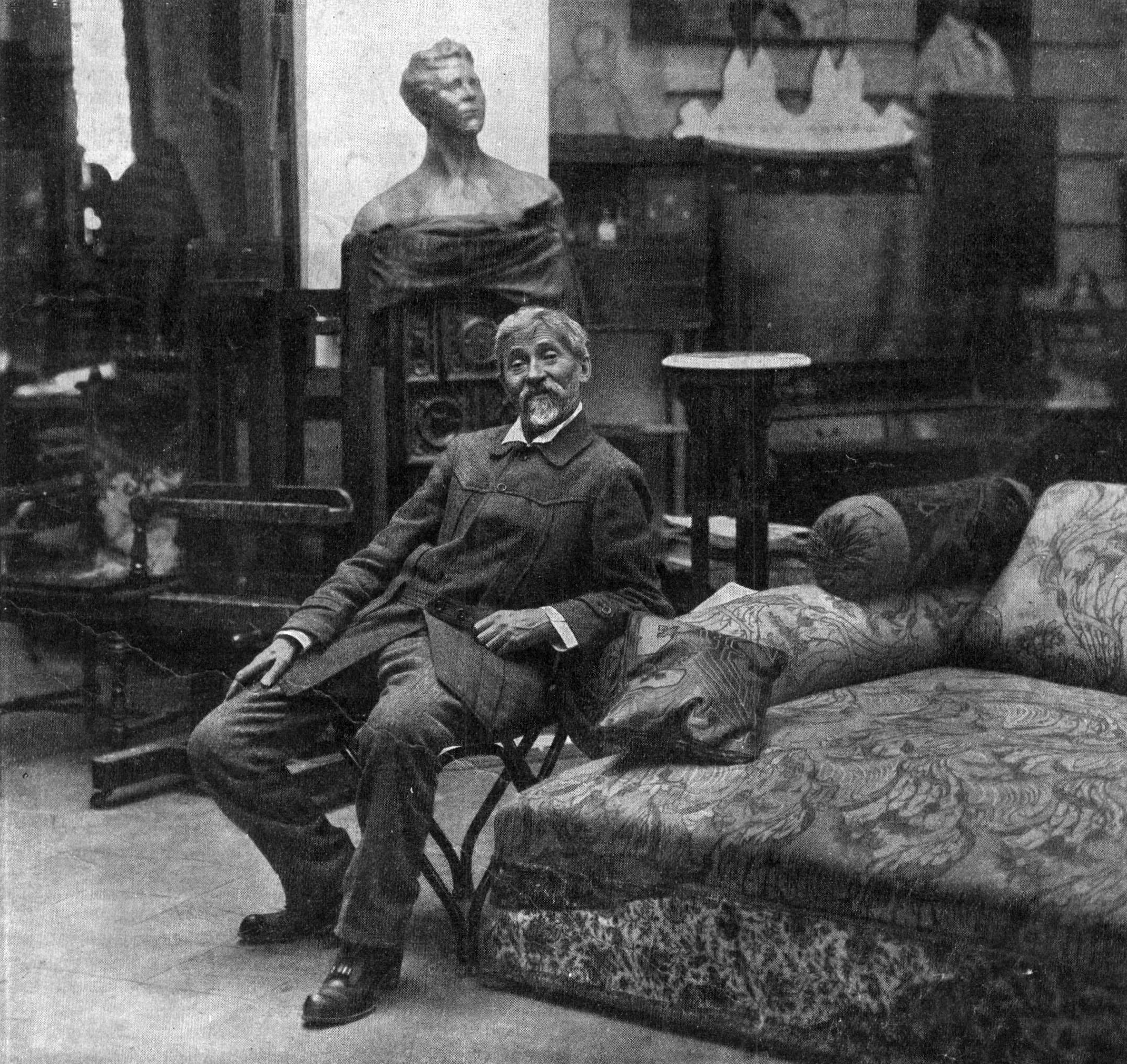
Repin at Penaty (1914)

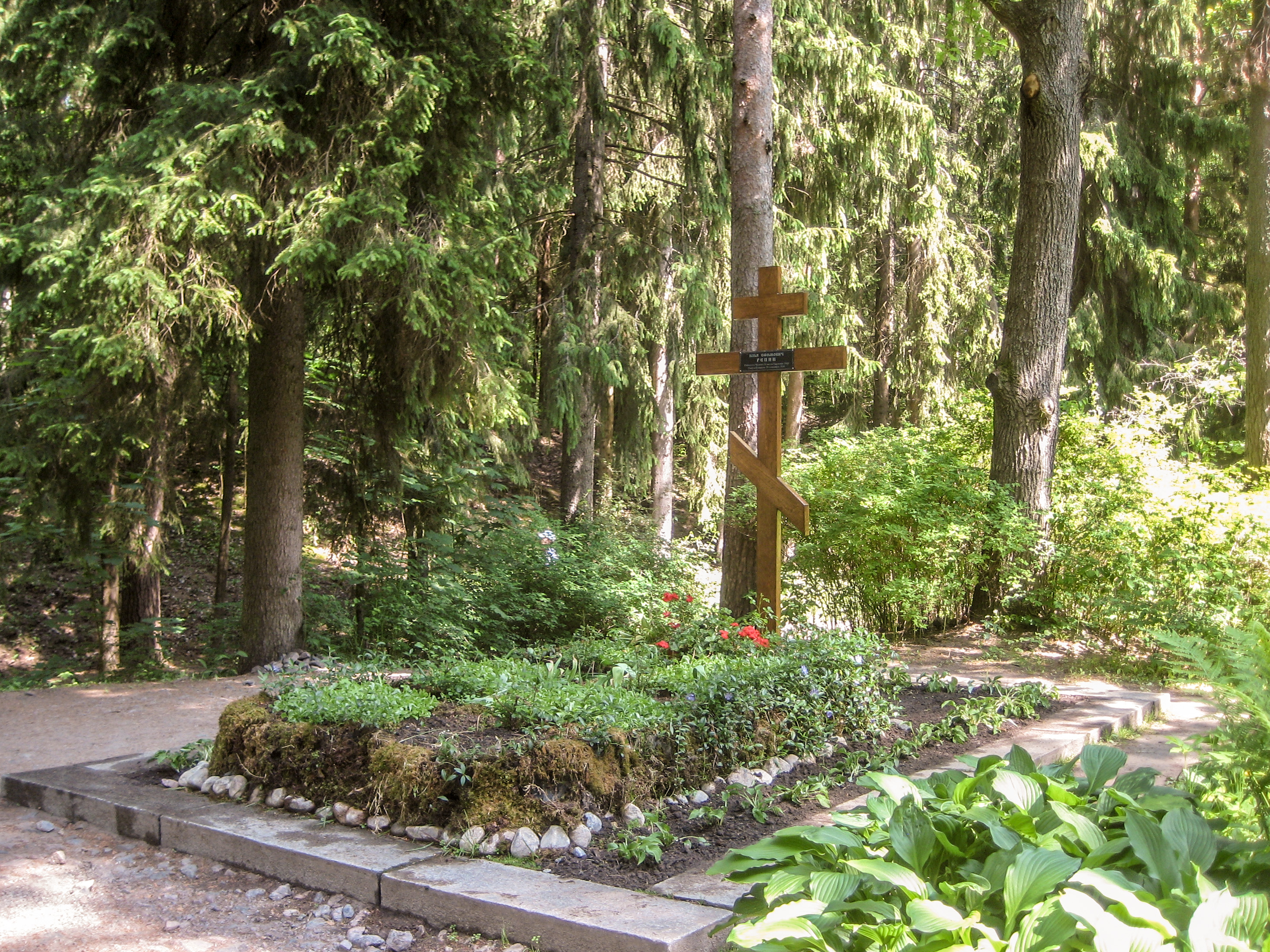
Grave of Ilya Repin
