= Yelabuga Nail =

1971 song by Dmitri Shostakovich

- Song by Dmitri Shostakovich
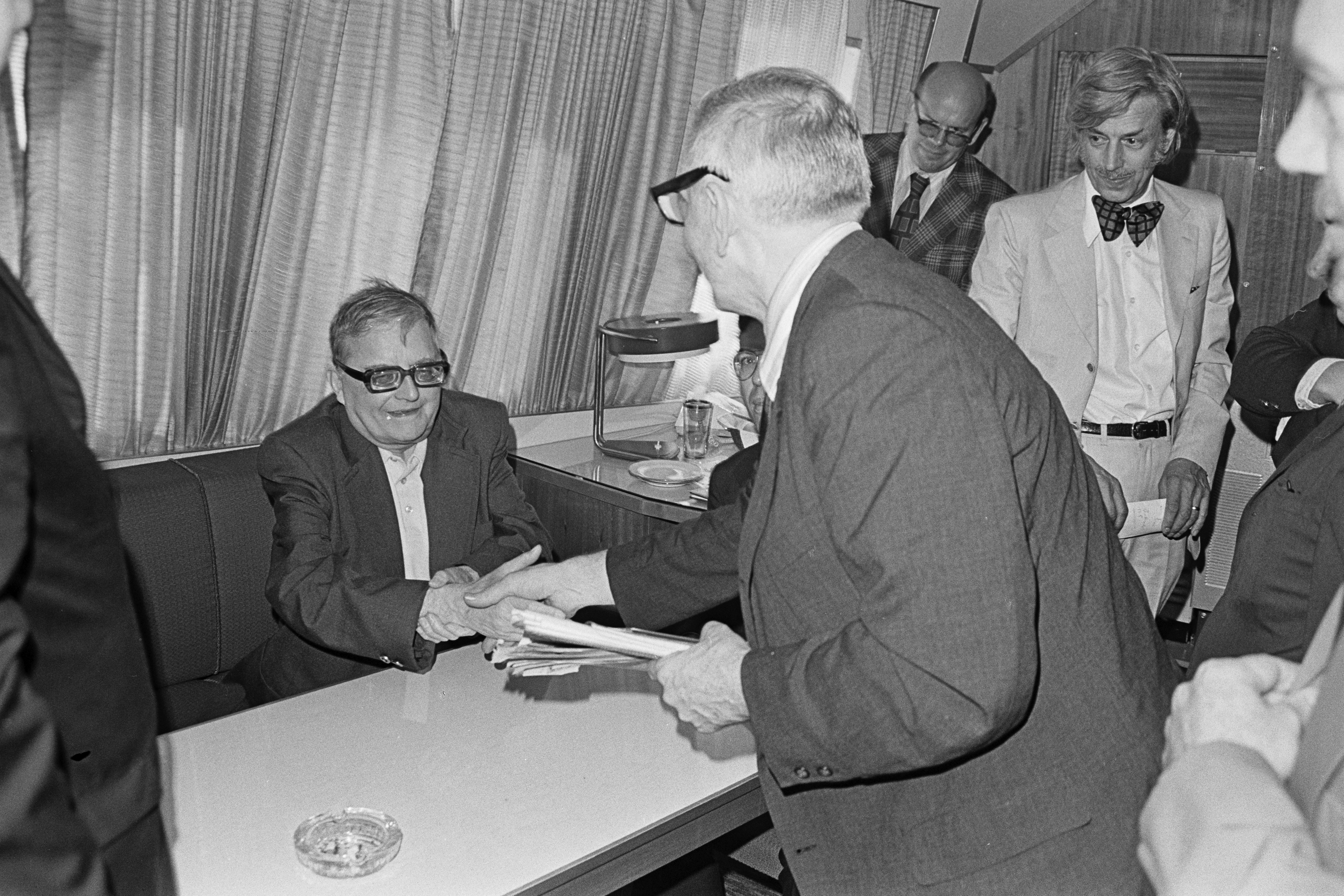
- Shostakovich (seated) in June 1973
- Native name: Елабужский гвоздь
- Composed: early 1971
- Scoring: Bass voice and piano

Premiere
- Date: June 28, 2025
- Location: Concert Barn; Gohrisch, Germany
- Performers: Alexander Roslavets (bass); Andrei Korobeinikov (piano)

"Yelabuga Nail" (Russian: Елабужский гвоздь, romanized: Yelabuzhsky gvozd') is an unfinished song composed by Dmitri Shostakovich in early 1971. It was premiered in 2025 in a completion by Alexander Raskatov.

== Background ==
Dmitri Shostakovich discovered the poetry of Marina Tsvetayeva in 1970, through the song cycle Three Songs to Verses by Marina Tsvetayeva by Boris Tishchenko. Shostakovich later requested a copy of the score, which he repeatedly played and sang at home, and acquired a collection of Tsvetayeva's poetry. "One gets the impression that [Shostakovich] himself could have written these poems had he been a poet", his official biographer, Sofia Khentova, later said.

In early 1971, Shostakovich sketched out the song "Yelabuga Nail", a setting of Yevgeny Yevtushenko's eponymous poem about Tsvetayeva's suicide in Yelabuga. Later in the same year, the composer told his friend, the arts critic Isaak Glikman, about the song and offered to play it for him. Shostakovich never informed Yevtushenko about his setting. The sketch of the song, which Khentova described as "clear and complete enough", takes up four pages, some of which also include sketches for the Fifteenth Symphony.

In 2023, the International Shostakovich Festival in Gohrisch, Germany, commissioned a completion of "Yelabuga Nail" from the composer Alexander Raskatov. He finished it the following year.

Although Jan Brachmann's liner notes for the 2025 premiere recording of "Yelabuga Nail" state that the song had only been discovered "a few months ago", it was first publicized in 1985 by Khentova in the second volume of her biography of Shostakovich. Aside from brief commentary on the music and manuscript, she also published a fragment of the score.

== Music ==
"Yelabuga Nail" is scored for bass voice and piano. Khentova said that the music "slowly recounts the mournful tale [of Tsvetayeva's suicide], with expressive time signature changes that group phrases into a pliant recitative". Raskatov used material from the song's opening measures for his completion. He composed most of the piano part and all the dynamic markings.

== Premieres ==
The concert premiere of "Yelabuga Nail" took place at the Concert Barn in Gohrisch on June 28, 2025, during the 16th International Shostakovich Festival. It was preceded in March 2025 by the recording premiere, made in sessions at the Teldex Studio in Berlin for Deutsche Grammophon. Alexander Roslavets and Andrei Korobeinikov were the performers for both premieres.

== Reception ==
The premiere recording of "Yelabuga Nail" was released on a Deutsche Grammophon compilation titled Shostakovich Discoveries on May 23, 2025. Reviewing for Gramophone, the musicologist David Fanning said that "Yelabuga Nail" was the most interesting work on the compilation:

The score has been more than plausibly completed by Alexander Raskatov. Full of denunciatory outrage and pre-echoes of its near-contemporary, the Fifteenth Symphony, this is authentic, bleaker-than-bleak late Shostakovich...

Another musicologist, Olga Digonskaya, said that the song forecast the Fifteenth Symphony, for which it served as a "creative laboratory" and provided important material.
