= Symphony No. 15 (Shostakovich) =

1971 symphony by Dmitri Shostakovich

- by Dmitri Shostakovich
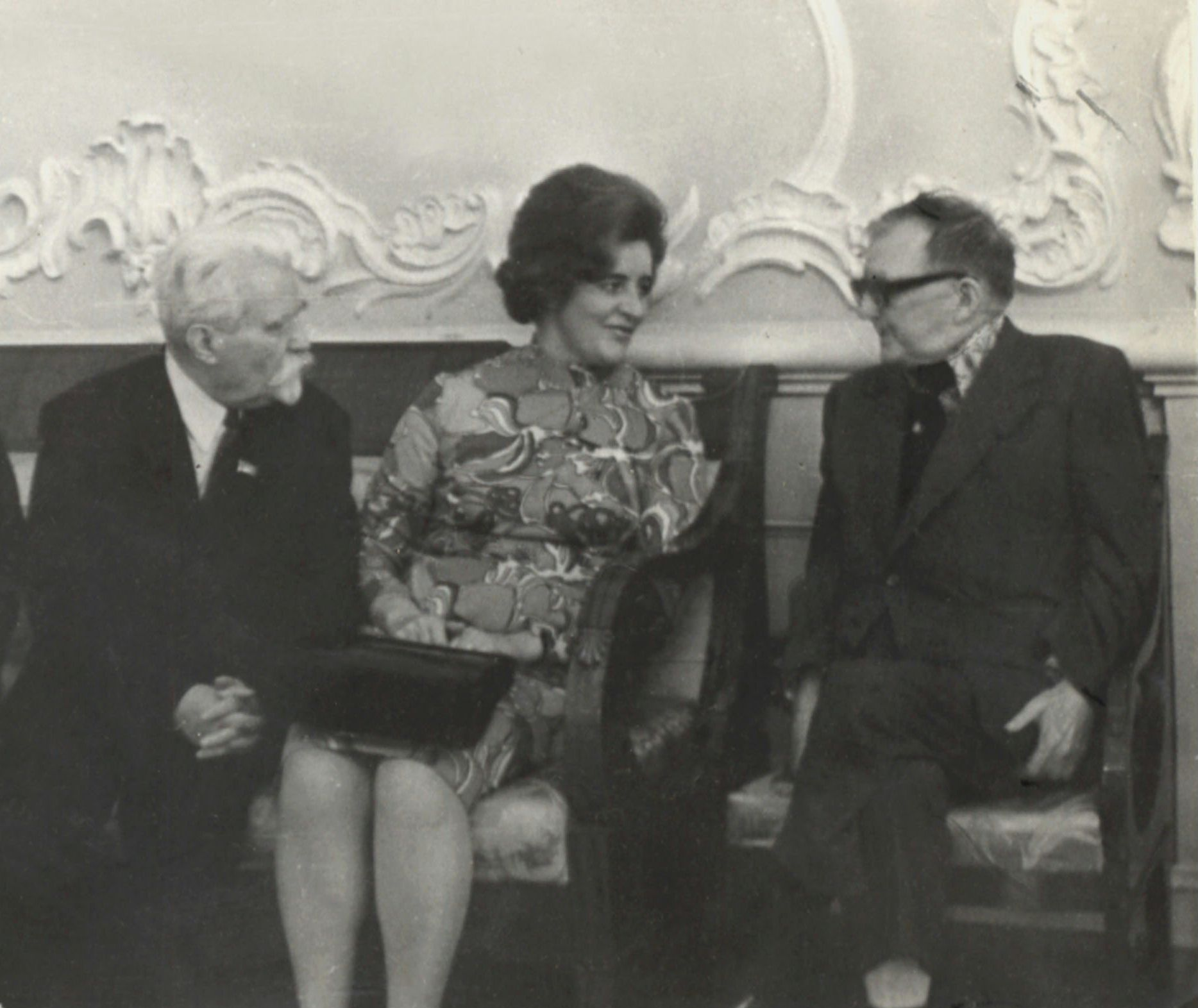
- Dmitri Shostakovich (far right) in 1974 (photograph by Yuri Shcherbinin)
- Key: A major
- Opus: 141
- Composed: late 1970–July 29, 1971
- Published: 1972
- Publisher: Hans Sikorski Musikverlage
- Duration: c. 45 minutes
- Movements: 4
- Scoring: Orchestra

Premiere
- Date: January 8, 1972
- Location: Large Hall of the Moscow Conservatory
- Conductor: Maxim Shostakovich
- Performers: All-Union Radio and Television Symphony Orchestra

The Symphony No. 15 in A major, Op. 141, composed between late 1970 and July 29, 1971, is the final symphony by Dmitri Shostakovich. He began to plan and sketch the symphony, originally intended as a cheerful commemoration of his 65th birthday, in late 1970. After completing the sketch score in April 1971, he began the orchestration in June, during his medical therapy in Kurgan. The symphony was completed on July 29 at his summer dacha in Repino. This was followed by a prolonged period of creative inactivity that did not end until the composition of the Fourteenth Quartet in 1973.

The Fifteenth Symphony was first performed privately in a reduction for two pianos for members of the Union of Soviet Composers and invited guests in August 1971. Its scheduled world premiere in September was postponed after Shostakovich had his second heart attack earlier that month. After a two-month hospitalization, he recovered enough to attend rehearsals in late December 1971 for the rescheduled premiere, which took place in Moscow on January 8, 1972, performed by the All-Union Radio and Television Symphony Orchestra conducted by Maxim Shostakovich. The first performance outside the Soviet Union took place in Philadelphia on September 28, 1972, by the Philadelphia Orchestra conducted by Eugene Ormandy. Immediate critical reaction to the symphony was positive in the Soviet Union, but mixed in the West.

Shostakovich's extensive use of musical quotation in the Fifteenth has attracted speculation. He initially likened the first movement to a toyshop, but later cautioned listeners against taking his description too precisely. A quotation from Gioacchino Rossini's William Tell Overture recurs throughout the first movement, while the last movement quotes a song by Mikhail Glinka and Richard Wagner's Götterdämmerung and Tristan und Isolde. Critics have also detected more quotations and allusions, from other composers as well as Shostakovich's own music.

== Background ==
=== Origins ===
Shostakovich began to prepare the Fifteenth Symphony in late 1970; he originally envisioned it as a present to himself for his 65th birthday. He wrote to Boris Tishchenko that he wanted to write a "merry symphony". By no later than April 2, 1971, Shostakovich completed a sketch outline of the symphony that was sparsely notated and made extensive use of shorthand. The sketch manuscript totals 18 pages. It also includes sketches for "Yelabuga Nail", an unfinished setting of a poem by Yevgeny Yevtushenko about the suicide of Marina Tsvetayeva.

=== Composition ===
In June 1971, Shostakovich continued treatment for his poliomyelitis at the clinic of Gavriil Ilizarov in Kurgan, where the composer had been a patient since 1968. While there he began the final draft of the symphony. He wrote to his friend, the writer Marietta Shaginyan, that he was on the "verge of tears" from work:

Tears flowed from my eyes not because the symphony was sad, but because my eyes were so exhausted. I even went to an ophthalmologist who suggested that I take a short break. The break was very hard for me. It is annoying to step away when one is at work.

Similarly, Shostakovich told Sofia Khentova, his official biographer, that his pace of work on the symphony did not permit him rest. "It was a work which simply grabbed me, one of the few which appeared in my mind with total clarity from first note to last", he continued. "There was nothing left for me to do but write it down". Veniamin Basner, in contrast, recalled that Shostakovich complained to him that completion of the finale progressed too slowly.

Upon completion of medical treatment in Kurgan, Shostakovich continued to write the symphony at his summer dacha in Repino. He was visited there on July 13 by his friend, the critic and arts administrator Isaak Glikman. Shostakovich told him that he had completed the first two movements and was working on the third, but had not yet been able to compose a finale. The problem, Shostakovich told Glikman, brought to mind parallels he discerned between the Fifteenth and Ninth symphonies, particularly what he believed was their shared lack of a central idea. Shostakovich completed the Fifteenth on July 29, in Basner's presence. The symphony was his last, as well as his first purely instrumental and non-programmatic symphony since the Tenth.

"The new symphony is still warm and I like it", Shostakovich later told Glikman. "But, perhaps after some time has gone by, I will think about it differently".

== Music ==
=== Instrumentation and timing ===
The Fifteenth Symphony is scored for the following instruments:

Woodwinds
Piccolo
2 Flutes
2 Oboes
2 Clarinets in A
2 Bassoons

Brass
4 French horns
2 Trumpets
3 Trombones
Tuba

Percussion
4 Timpani
Triangle
Castanets
Woodblock
Whip
Tom-Tom (soprano)
Snare Drum
Cymbals
Bass Drum
Tam-Tam
Glockenspiel
Xylophone
Vibraphone

Keyboards
Celesta

Strings
1st Violins
2nd Violins
Violas
Cellos
Double Basses

Notwithstanding the large percussion section, the piece is scored for a smaller ensemble than the one needed to play Shostakovich's First. The composer indicated in the score that the number of instruments listed were the minimum required, but "if there are more, then it would be better".

A typical performance lasts approximately 45 minutes.

=== Structure ===
The symphony consists of four movements, the middle two played attacca.

1. Allegretto
2. Adagio – Largo – Adagio – Largo
3. Allegretto
4. Adagio – Allegretto – Adagio – Allegretto

=== Description ===
The first movement begins with two chimes on the glockenspiel, followed by a five-note motif on solo flute, accompanied by pizzicato strings. This leads into a galloping motif for trumpet constructed out of all twelve notes of the Western chromatic scale. Hugh Ottaway observed that Shostakovich's use of such motifs in this symphony create an "enlarged tonal field in which 'chromatic' and 'diatonic' cease to be meaningful distinctions". Recurring five times in the movement are quotations from the William Tell Overture by Gioacchino Rossini.

The second movement begins with a brass chorale, followed by a cello solo. These themes alternate with a funeral march introduced by a pair of solo flutes, then taken up by a solo trombone. Sounding several times are what musicologist Iosif Raiskin calls the "chords of death". This builds to a climax, after which the opening chorale is reprised on muted strings, then fades away on a timpani roll, after which bassoons announce the start of the scherzando third movement.

The finale contains several musical quotations, starting with the "fate motif" from Götterdämmerung, followed by the opening motif fromTristan und Isolde. This segues into a reminiscence of Mikhail Glinka's song "Do Not Tempt Me Needlessly". A passacaglia theme, whose resemblance to the march from Shostakovich's Seventh Symphony has been noted, is introduced and builds to another climax. The "chords of death" from the "Adagio" announce the symphony's coda. This is followed by a restatement on celesta of the symphony's opening motif. An open A-major chord, sustained over a percussion part that recalls the scherzo of Shostakovich's Fourth Symphony, is finally resolved by a three-octave C♯ that concludes the work.

=== Arrangements ===
After completing the orchestral score, Shostakovich arranged the symphony for two pianos in order for it to be auditioned at the Union of Soviet Composers. It was first performed there in early August 1971 by Boris Tchaikovsky and Mieczysław Weinberg. (Note: Neither the biographies by Laurel Fay, Sofia Khentova, and Krzysztof Meyer, the catalogs by Derek C. Hulme and Gerard McBurney, nor the editorial notes of the new collected works editions specify the date that it was performed.) Although Derek C. Hulme said the arrangement was completed on January 4, 1972, this is disputed by the editors of the new complete works edition of the arrangement, who say it contradicts the documented performance history. The manuscript of the arrangement is not dated.

In August 1972, the pianist Viktor Derevyanko, with assistance from the percussionist and composer Mark Pekarsky, produced a chamber arrangement of the Fifteenth Symphony. It is scored for violin, cello, piano (alternating with celesta), and percussion. Shostakovich approved this arrangement and designated it Op. 141a.

== Premieres ==
Shortly after Shostakovich completed the Fifteenth Symphony, he informed his son, the conductor Maxim. Shostakovich's first choice to lead the symphony's premiere, Kirill Kondrashin, developed severe heart problems in mid-1971 and was unable to conduct. Therefore, the composer entrusted the first performance to Maxim.

The completed score of the Fifteenth Symphony was sent to copyists at the Union of Soviet Composers by September 9 in preparation for its world premiere, which had been announced for late 1971. On September 17, Shostakovich suffered his second heart attack, which postponed the premiere. He stayed in the hospital until November 28, whereupon he was released to continue recovery at a sanatorium in Barvikha. Despite continued weakness in his arms and legs, Shostakovich's health improved sufficiently for him to attend rehearsals for the rescheduled premiere.

The symphony's world premiere occurred on January 8, 1972, at the Large Hall of the Moscow Conservatory; it was performed by the All-Union Radio and Television Symphony Orchestra conducted by Maxim Shostakovich. He also conducted the British premiere with the New Philharmonia Orchestra on November 20, 1972.

Leopold Stokowski and Eugene Ormandy vied to conduct the first performance of the Fifteenth Symphony in the United States. The rights were ultimately granted to the latter, who conducted the Philadelphia Orchestra in the symphony's American premiere on September 28, 1972.

=== Chamber arrangement ===
The chamber arrangement by Derevyanko and Pekarsky of the symphony was premiered on October 30, 1972, at the All-Union House of Composers in Moscow. It was performed by Valeria Vilker (violin), Mark Drobinsky (cello), Derevyanko (piano), Alla Mamyko (percussion), Valentin Snegirev (percussion), and B. Stepanov (percussion).

== Reception ==
=== Soviet Union ===
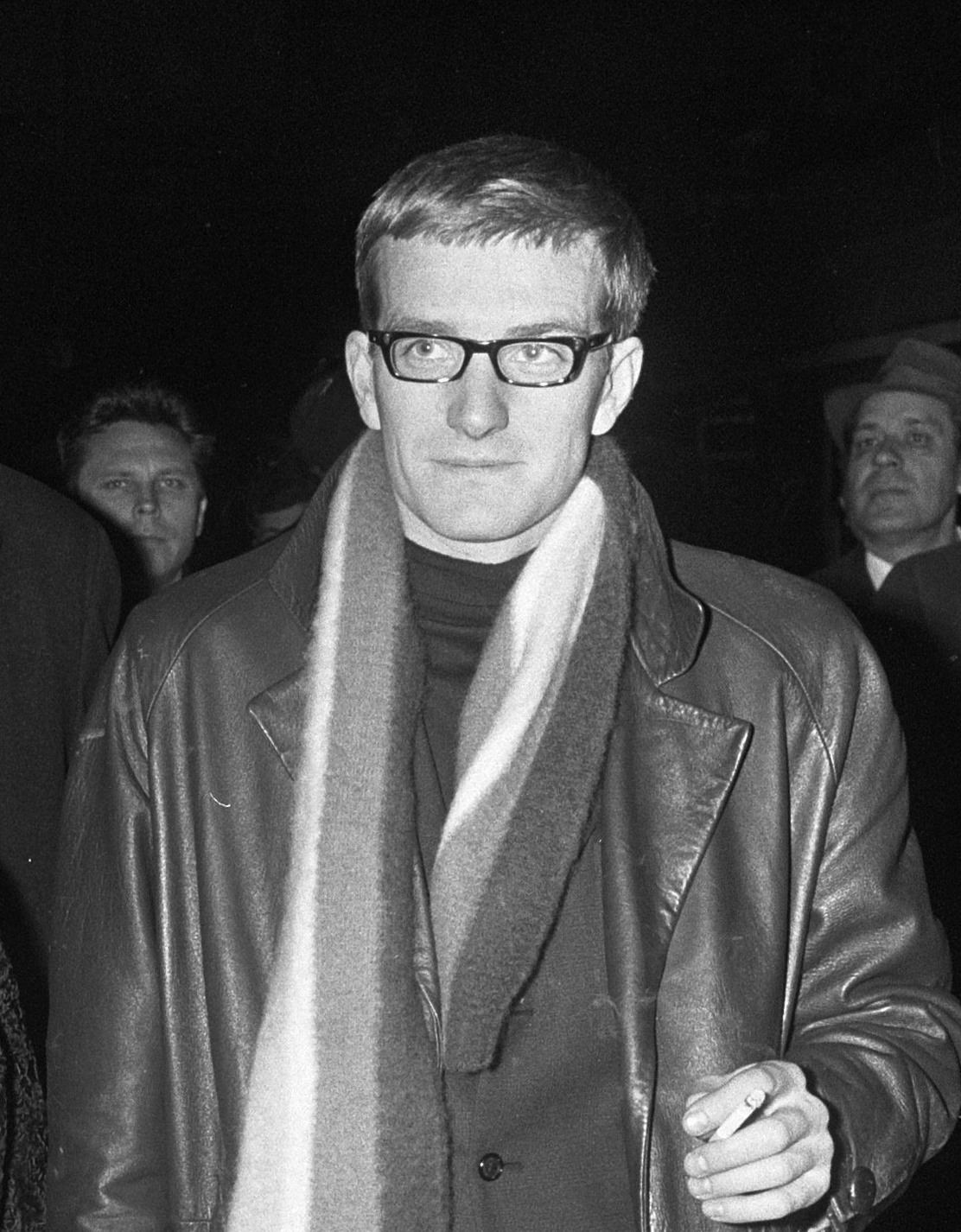
Maxim Shostakovich, conductor of the Fifteenth Symphony's premiere

Upon hearing its first performance, Shostakovich remarked that he had composed a "wicked symphony". It was received with an ovation by the audience at its premiere. Marietta Shaginyan was among the symphony's admirers. After the premiere, she met with Shostakovich at the hall's green room and made the sign of the cross over him. "You must not say, Dmitri Dmitrievich, that you are not well", she told him. "You are well, because you have made us happy!"

Nevertheless, despite the positive reception of the Fifteenth Symphony at its premiere, and the puzzlement it provoked, it generated a more muted response in the Soviet Union compared to the Thirteenth and Fourteenth symphonies. The American musicologist Richard Taruskin, who was an exchange student at the Moscow Conservatory, attended the symphony's premiere. He recalled in a 2001 essay for The New Republic:

[The symphony] was not much liked, actually. But the outpouring of love that greeted the gray, stumbling, begoggled figure of the author, then sixty-five and beset by a multitude of infirmities, was not just an obeisance to the Soviet composer laureate. It was a grateful, emotional salute to a cherished life companion, a fellow citizen, and fellow sufferer, who had forged a mutually sustaining relationship with his public that was altogether outside the experience of any musician in [the West].

Tikhon Khrennikov, general secretary of the Union of Soviet Composers, called the symphony one of Shostakovich's "most profound"; he added that it was "full of optimism [and] belief in man's inexhaustible strength". Yevgeny Mravinsky, who conducted the symphony's Leningrad premiere, believed the work to be autobiographical. While studying the score, he told his wife that he was emotionally overwhelmed by the music.

The earliest Soviet reviews of the symphony pointed to its perceived sense of surprise and crypticness. The first substantial analysis was published in the September 1972 issue of Sovyetskaya Muzyka. Its author, the musicologist Yuri Korev, sought to reconcile what he viewed as the symphony's incongruities with the context of Shostakovich's previous music, as well as the prevailing ideals of Soviet music. Another musicologist, Mark Aranovsky, explored the symphony's metaphysical and semantic implications in an essay that is considered a pioneering text in Russian musicology.

=== In the West ===
The first movement drew especial praise from Norman Kay, who called it a "tour-de-force of concentration, self-dissolution, and musical economy". Eric Roseberry wrote that the symphony's instrumental timbres and use of passacaglia suggested that Shostakovich had been influenced by the late operas of his friend and fellow composer Benjamin Britten. Bernard Jacobson wrote in 1972 that the symphony's lasting appeal was secured because it made use of "one of [Shostakovich's] greatest expressive assets—a teasing and often powerfully affective emotional ambivalence".

=== Speculation about the symphony's meaning ===
The Fifteenth Symphony's use of musical quotations and allusions, as well as devices unusual in Shostakovich's output, has attracted speculation since its premiere. Shostakovich explained the music and its process of composition by saying that he continued to feel music the way he did as a child, and that he felt compelled to use quotations. To Glikman and Krzysztof Meyer, Shostakovich said that he not only used exact quotations from Beethoven, Rossini, and Wagner, but had also been under the influence of Mahler while he composed the symphony. According to Maxim Shostakovich, he had been urged by his father not to reveal to the orchestra at the first rehearsal that there would be a quotation from Rossini in the first movement. "I want to see their faces when they come to it", the composer told him.

During an interview in Chicago for WFMT on June 15, 1973, the radio host Norman Pellegrini asked Shostakovich if the symphony was conceived as program music. The composer replied:

In the Fifteenth Symphony, there is no defined program. I myself said, the first part is as if played in a toy store. I myself said that. But to consider this precise or exact, I myself said it, but maybe it did not come quite that way. As far as the quotations that I used from The Ring cycle of Wagner, less known romances of Glinka... They ask me why, why did you do that? I don't know, I don't really know, it just seemed to be necessary, it seemed to be necessary... But much in a question of creativity is a phenomenon, inexplicable phenomena, and a very difficult thing to explain, including why [I have] taken those particular things, why these particular fragments. I can't explain very precisely or exactly why I did this.

Maxim Shostakovich felt the symphony reflected "the great philosophical problems of a man's life cycle". Later he likened the work to a chamber symphony that describes human life through the "prison of existence". The conductor Kurt Sanderling felt the music was about loneliness and death, and that no other work by Shostakovich seemed to him so "radically horrible and cruel". Alfred Schnittke, whose own music was deeply influenced by Shostakovich, held that the Fifteenth was a "crossroads in time" where "the past enters into new relationships with the present, and, like the ghost of Hamlet's father, intrudes into the reality of the music and actually forms it". To Alexander Ivashkin, Shostakovich's then unusual use of quotation signaled an awareness of the impossibility of composing a "pure" symphony, with the quotations creating a web of correspondences atop the "traditional skeleton of the symphony".

The musicologist Levon Hakobian suggested that the William Tell quotations in the symphony's first movement may relate to Shostakovich's identification with Rossini as a composer "who outlived his talent". During this period, Shostakovich repeatedly expressed concern that he had exhausted himself as a composer. To Shaginyan, he wrote on August 26 that the completion of the symphony he had "worked on day and night" left him feeling as if in a void. He wrote to Krzysztof Meyer in a letter dated September 16, 1971, that he had doubts about whether to continue as a composer but could not bear to live without work. Shostakovich experienced a prolonged period of creative inactivity after completing the symphony. Aside from his arrangement of the "Serenade" by Gaetano Braga, which was intended for an unrealized opera based on Anton Chekhov's short story "The Black Monk", Shostakovich did not resume composition until the Fourteenth Quartet in March 1973.

=== Influence on David Lynch ===
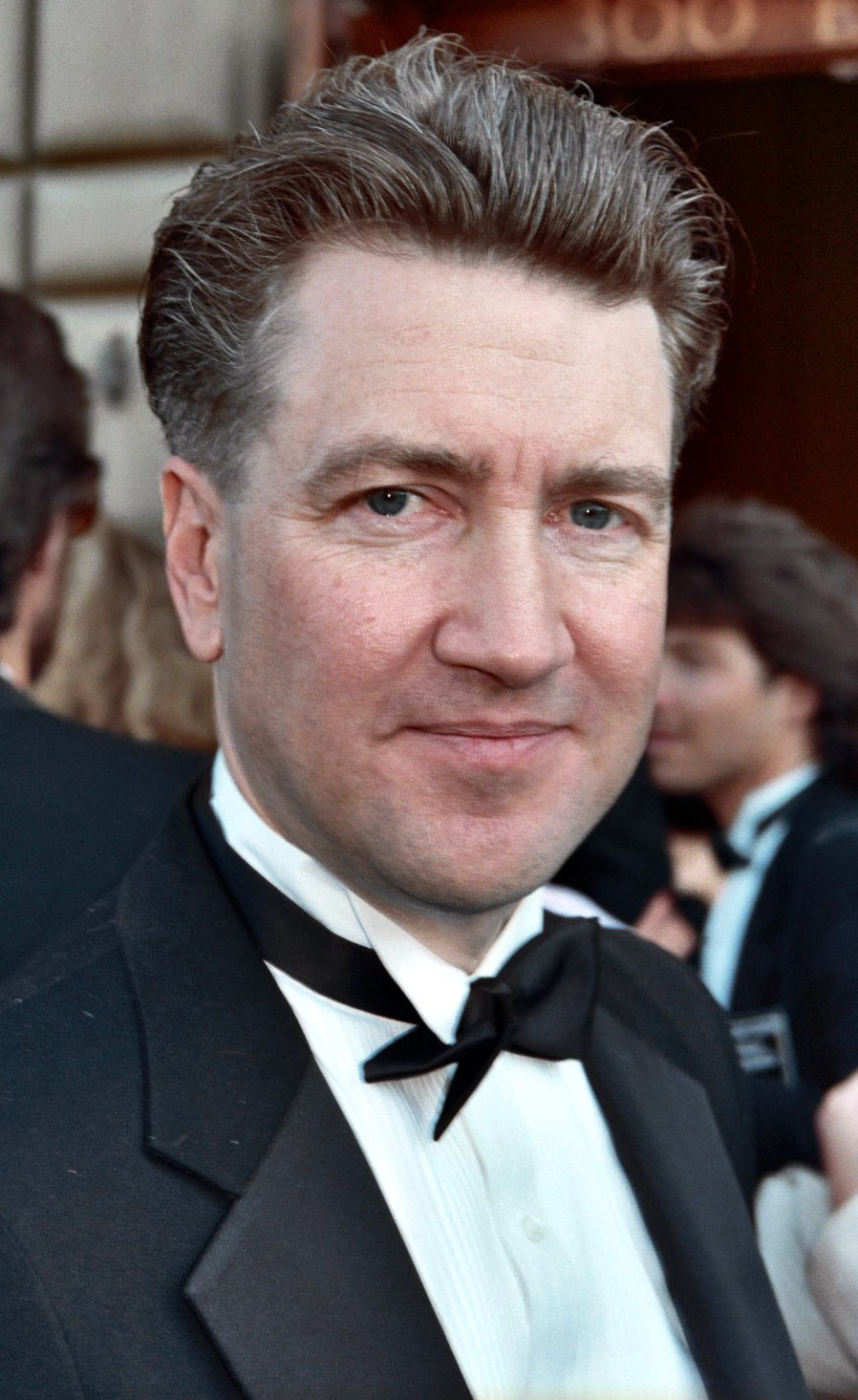
David Lynch in 1990

During the production of the 1984 film Dune, the film director David Lynch told its composer, David Paich, that he wanted a score that resembled Shostakovich. While working on the screenplay for his subsequent film, Blue Velvet, Lynch repeatedly listened to Shostakovich's Fifteenth Symphony:

I liked this Russian feel. I don't know where I got this thing that the Eastern Europe [sic], Russian air is different ... even the wood of the instruments ... it just makes a sound, and there's a depth that the air brings and the musicians bring... And so this particular symphony I listened to all the time when I was working on the script and it just became very important that this film had that feel.

Lynch told Angelo Badalementi, the composer for Blue Velvet, that he wanted his score to evoke the sound of Shostakovich's symphony. Badalamenti had a master's degree in composition but only two film scores to his credit; before Blue Velvet, most of his experience was in pop music. Nevertheless, Lynch was confident that Badalamenti could "play anything and tune into anything". The finished score has a number of cues influenced by Shostakovich's Fifteenth Symphony, particularly its second movement.

Lynch also played the symphony on set during the filming of Blue Velvet.
