= Zen-On Music Company Ltd =

- Native name: 全音楽譜出版社 (Zen Ongakufu Shuppansha)
- Industry: Music publishing
- Founded: 1931; 95 years ago
- Headquarters: Shinjuku, Tokyo, Japan

Zen-On Music Company Ltd (全音楽譜出版社, Zen Ongakufu Shuppansha) is a music publishing company based in Shinjuku, Tokyo, in Japan. Zen-On publishes sheet music for sale and rental, including orchestral scores, band and wind ensemble music, solo works and contemporary works, such as Frederic Rzewski's The People United Will Never Be Defeated!. The company was founded in 1931.

Zen-On are also responsible for the publications of Asian classical composers, such as Joe Hisaishi.
