= Repino, Saint Petersburg =

Repino Репино Kuokkala (Finnish)
- Municipal Settlement
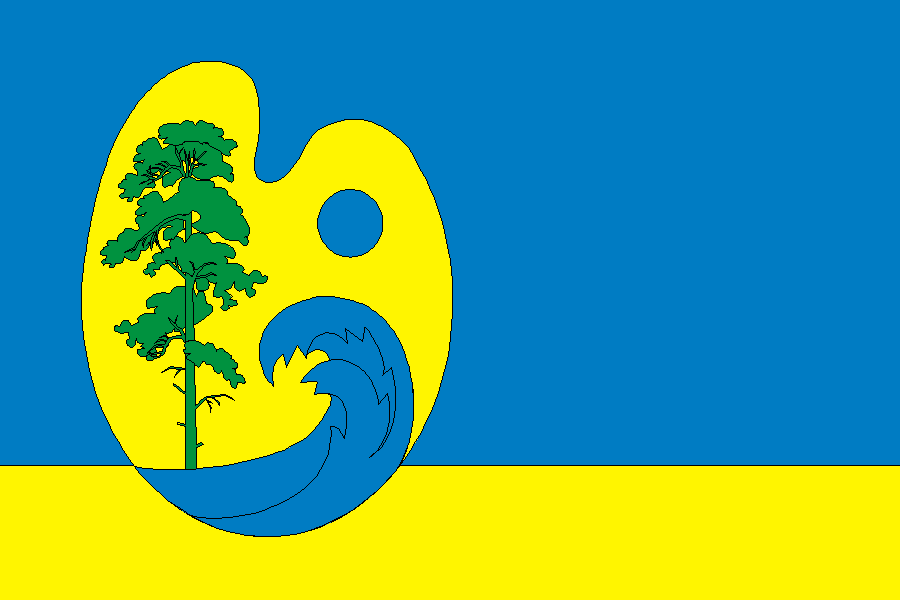
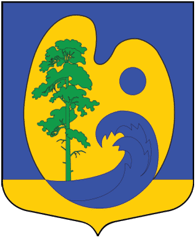
- Flag Coat of arms

- Location of Repino in Saint Petersburg
- Interactive map of Repino
- Location of Repino Repino (Saint Petersburg)
- Coordinates: 60°10′N 29°52′E
- Country: Russia
- Federal subject: Saint Petersburg

Area
  - Total: 15.88 km^{2} (6.13 sq mi)
- Elevation: 23 m (75 ft)

Population (2010 Census)
  - Total: 2,478
  - Estimate (2023): 2,917 (+17.7%)
  - Density: 156.0/km^{2} (404.2/sq mi)
- Time zone: UTC+
- Postal code: 197738
- Dialing code: +7 +7 812
- OKTMO ID: 40367000

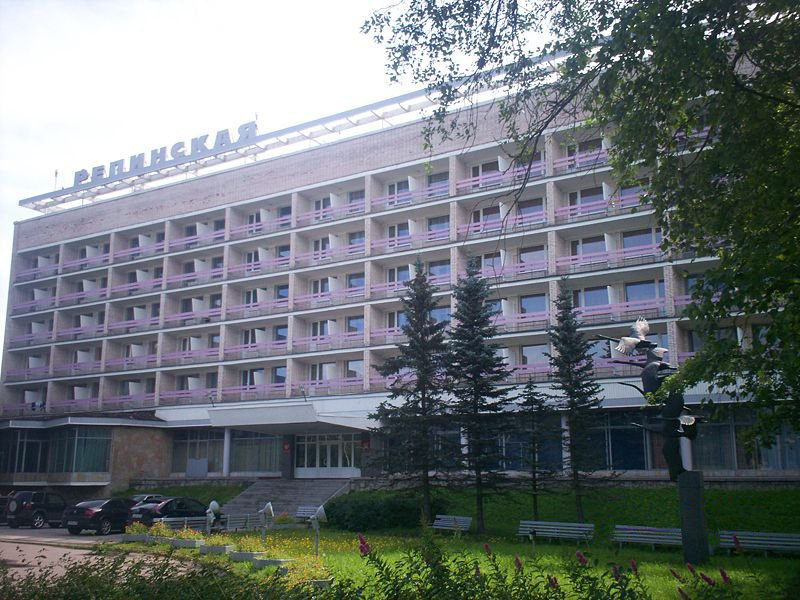
Soviet-era hotel Repinskaya in Repino

Repino (Russian: Ре́пино) is an area of Saint Petersburg, Russia, and a station of the Saint Petersburg-Vyborg railroad. It was known by its Finnish name Kuokkala until 1948, when it was renamed after its most famous inhabitant, the painter Ilya Repin. It is 30 kilometers (19 mi) northwest of St. Petersburg on the Karelian Isthmus and Gulf of Finland. The population was 2,478 at the 2010 Census.

== History ==
The first mention of Kuokkala is in a peace treaty between the Republic of Novgorod and the Kingdom of Sweden in 1323. The territory where the village is located was fought over between the Muscovites and Swedes in the 16th and 17th centuries and came under Russian control after the Great Northern War in the early 18th century. The village was inhabited by fishermen of Finnish and Russian ethnicities. The area developed further after 1870 when the railway linking St Petersburg and Helsinki passed through the town. Wealthier residents of St Peterburg built holiday villas in the area and a new railway station was built in 1889. Kuokkala was located in the Grand Duchy of Finland, a self-governing part of the Russian Empire, which had a more liberal environment, attracting artists and intellectuals including the artist Ilya Repin. The Bolshevik leaders, Bogdanov and Lenin spent some time in Kuokkala during 1905 to 1907, staying at the Vasa Villa, which served as the Bolshevik headquarters.

Shortly after the October Revolution in 1917, Finland declared its independence from the Russian SFSR and Kuokkala became part of the new independent nation while retaining a significant ethnic Russian population. There was a skirmish between White and Russia-backed Red Finns at Kuokkala during the Finnish Civil War on 28 April 1918. In 1939, Kuokkala was taken over by the Soviet Union as the Karelian Isthmus was ceded by Finland to the USSR after the Soviet invasion of Finland (1939–1940). Kuokkala became a part of the Leningrad Oblast in 1948 and was renamed Repino by the Soviet regime in memory of the painter Ilya Repin. After the war, the area was developed as a tourist area with several hotels and sanatoriums and was transferred to the jurisdiction of the city of St Petersburg as part of the Kurortny District.

== Penates ==
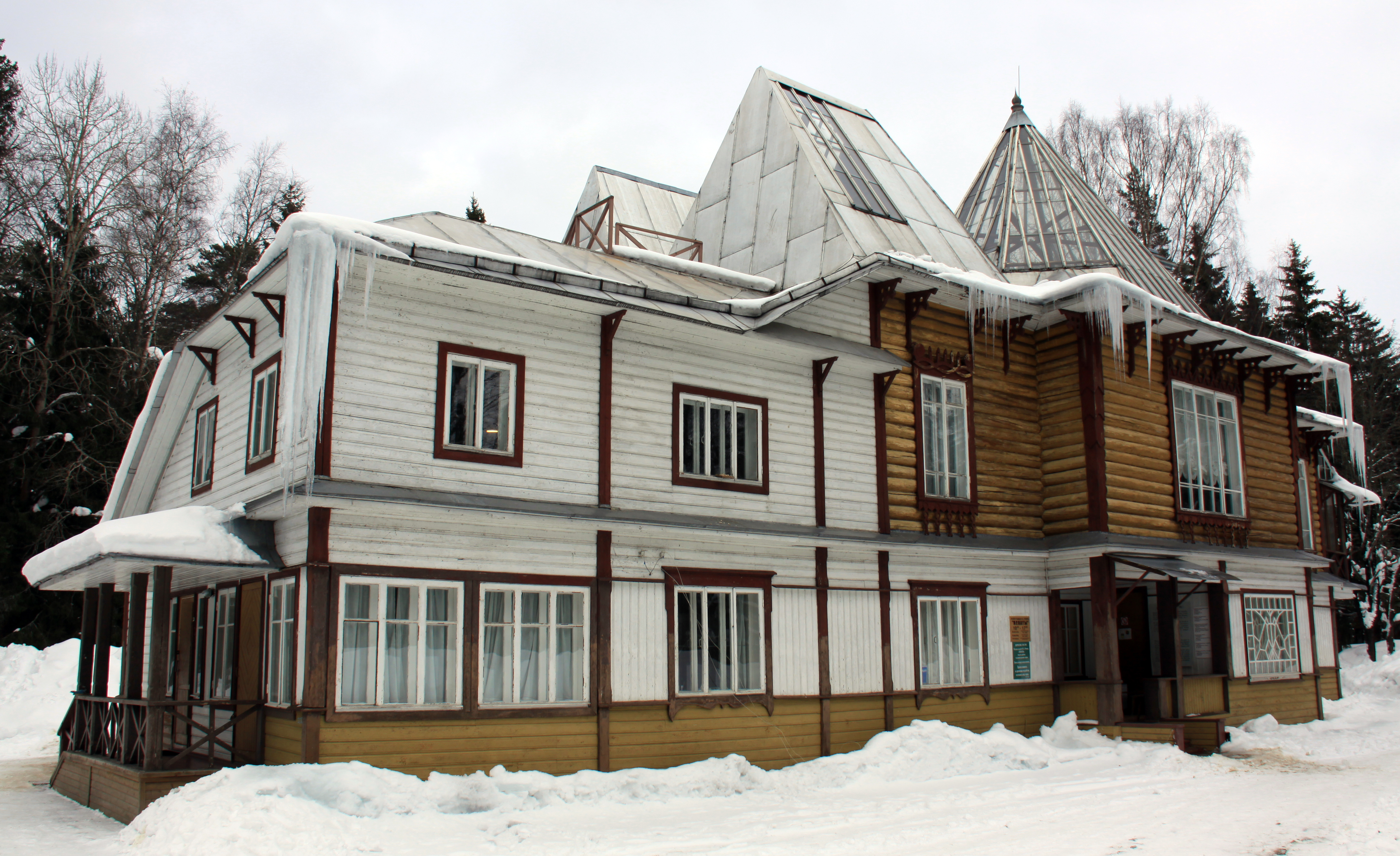
Ilya Repin's home called "Penates"

(See also: Penates House-Museum of Ilya Repin)

In 1899, Repin bought an estate here and called it Penaty (Russian: Пенаты, meaning Penates, Roman household deities). He designed his own house, and after it had been built several years later, Repin moved to Kuokkala. He lived there until his death in 1930. The house is surrounded by a large park.

The estate is part of the UNESCO World Heritage Site "Saint Petersburg and Related Groups of Monuments". The estate has been a museum since 1940.

== Famous inhabitants ==
- Ivan Puni, avant-garde artist, was born in Kuokkala in 1894.
- Rosa Luxemburg, prominent Polish revolutionary socialist, stayed in Kuokkala from August until September, 1906.
- Vladimir Lenin, Russian communist leader and founder of the USSR, lived in Kuokkala between 1906 and 1907.
- Mikhail Botvinnik, chess player, was born in Kuokkala in 1911.
- Ilya Repin, painter and sculptor, lived in Kuokkala from the beginning of the 20th century until his death in 1930.
- Korney Chukovsky, children's poet and philologist, lived in Kuokkala from 1906 until 1916.
- Elena Mrozovskaya, an early female photographer, died in Kuokkala in 1941.
- Dmitri Shostakovich, Soviet composer, went to Cottage #20 at the Composers' Union Resort, located in Repino, to relax and compose, every year from 1961 to 1975.
- In 2018, Repino was the base for the England team for the 2018 FIFA World Cup that was held in Russia.
