= Irina Bogacheva (mezzo-soprano) =

Russian mezzo-soprano (1939–2019)

Irina Bogacheva Ирина Богачёва
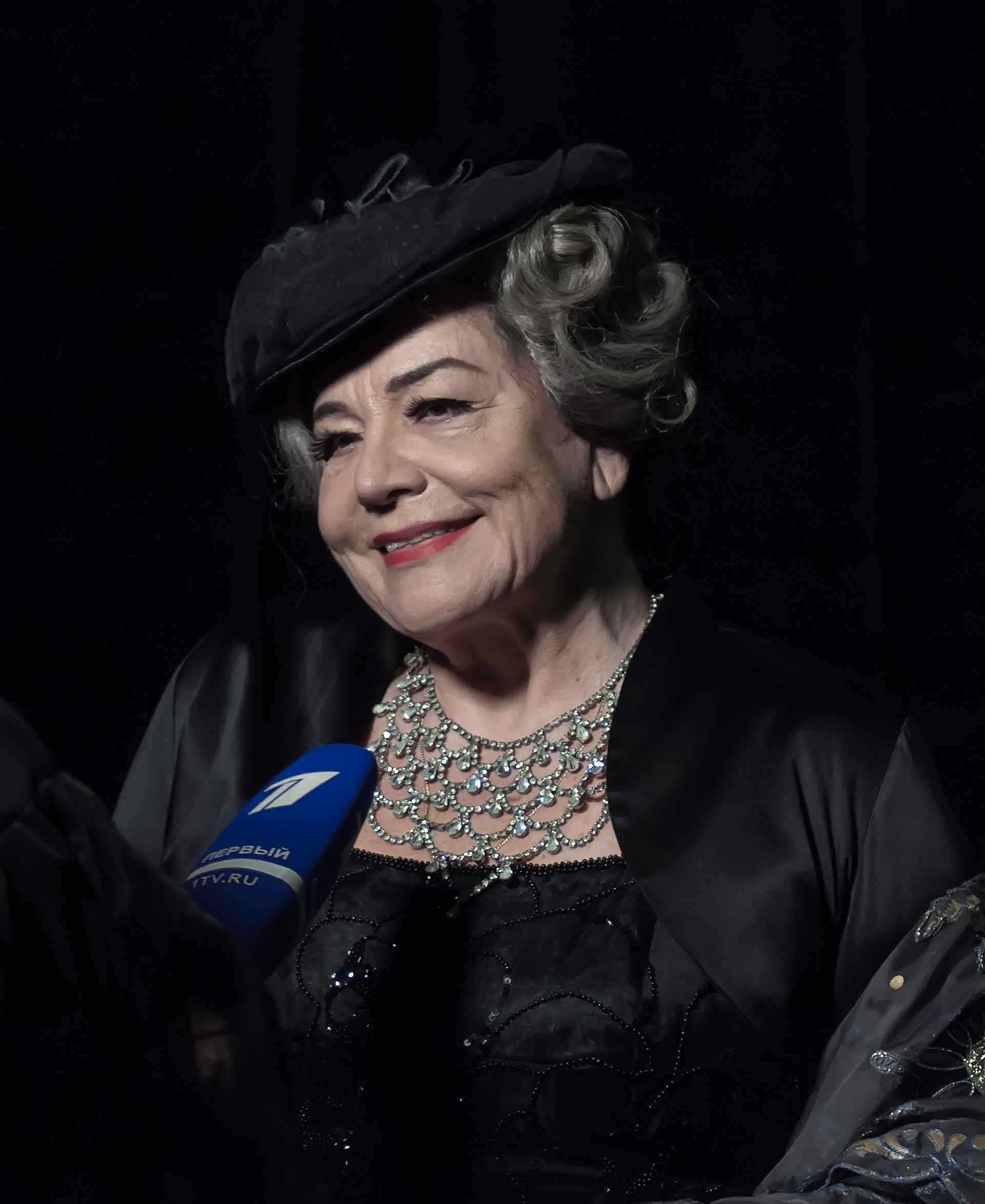
- Bogacheva in 2018

Background information
- Born: Irina Petrovna Komyakova; 2 March 1939; Leningrad, Russian SFSR, Soviet Union (present-day Saint Petersburg, Russia)
- Died: 19 September 2019 (aged 80) Saint Petersburg, Russia
- Occupations: Opera singer, voice teacher

Irina Petrovna Bogacheva (Note: Russian: Ирина Петровна Богачёва, romanized: Irina Petrovna Bogachyova) (née Komyakova, (Note: Russian: Ирина Петровна Комякова, romanized: Irina Petrovna Komyakova) 2 March 1939 – 19 September 2019) was a Russian mezzo-soprano at the Mariinsky Theatre and a professor of voice at the Saint Petersburg Conservatory. Trained in Leningrad and at La Scala in Milan, she performed leading roles of the Russian and Italian repertoire at major international opera houses. Dmitri Shostakovich composed his Six Poems by Marina Tsvetayeva for her.

== Life and career ==
Born in Leningrad, Bogacheva studied at the Rimsky-Korsakov Leningrad State Conservatory, and won the Glinka competition during her studies in 1962. She joined the Kirov Theatre, where she made her debut as Polina in Tchaikovsky's The Queen of Spades. She performed at the Mariinsky Theatre from 1963, and also elsewhere in the Soviet Union.

Bogacheva achieved a grand prize and gold medal at the international vocal competition in Rio de Janeiro in 1967, which enabled her to study further at La Scala in Milan with Gennaro Barra-Caracciolo. She performed at the opera house first in 1969 as Ulrica in Verdi's Un ballo in maschera. She appeared in leading mezzo roles in the Russian repertoire, such as Marfa in Mussorgsky's Khovanshchina, Lyubasha in Rimsky-Korsakov's The Tsar's Bride, and Marina in Mussorgsky's Boris Godunov. She performed the title role in Bizet's Carmen, and roles by Verdi including Eboli in Don Carlo, Amneris in Aida and Azucena in Il trovatore, among others. She appeared as a guest abroad, at the Opéra Bastille in Paris, the Royal Opera House in London, La Scala, and the Metropolitan Opera in New York City, among others. She toured with the Mariinsky Theatre in the U.S., Japan and Europe.

Dmitry Shostakovich composed his Six Poems by Marina Tsvetayeva for her, which she premiered in 1973.

Bogacheva lectured voice at the Saint Petersburg Conservatory from 1980, and was appointed professor in 1982. She became head of the faculty of solo singing, and initiated an international singing competition there. Her students include Olga Borodina and Natalia Yevstafieva. She died on 20 September 2019.

== Awards ==
Bogacheva achieved a grand prize and gold medal at the international vocal competition in Rio de Janeiro in 1967. She was a People's Artist of the USSR in 1970, and received the State Prize of the USSR in 1974, the State Prize of the Russian Federation in 1976, and became a member of the Order for Services to the Fatherland in 1984. She was an honorary citizen of Saint Petersburg.

== Recording ==
- Bogacheva recorded Russian vocal music, Irina Bogacheva Vocal Recital in 1995, including Valentyn Borysov's "The Stars in the Sky", Pyotr Bulakhov's "Don't Wake Me Up", Dargomizhsky's aria from The Stone Guest, songs by Gavrilin, A. I. Shishkin's "No, It Is Not You I Love So Passionately", Solovyov-Sedoy's "In the boat", Aleksandr Yegorovich Varlamov's "O Do Not Kiss Me".
