= Saint Petersburg Philharmonia =

Music society and hall in Saint Petersburg, Russia

- Санкт-Петербургская филармония
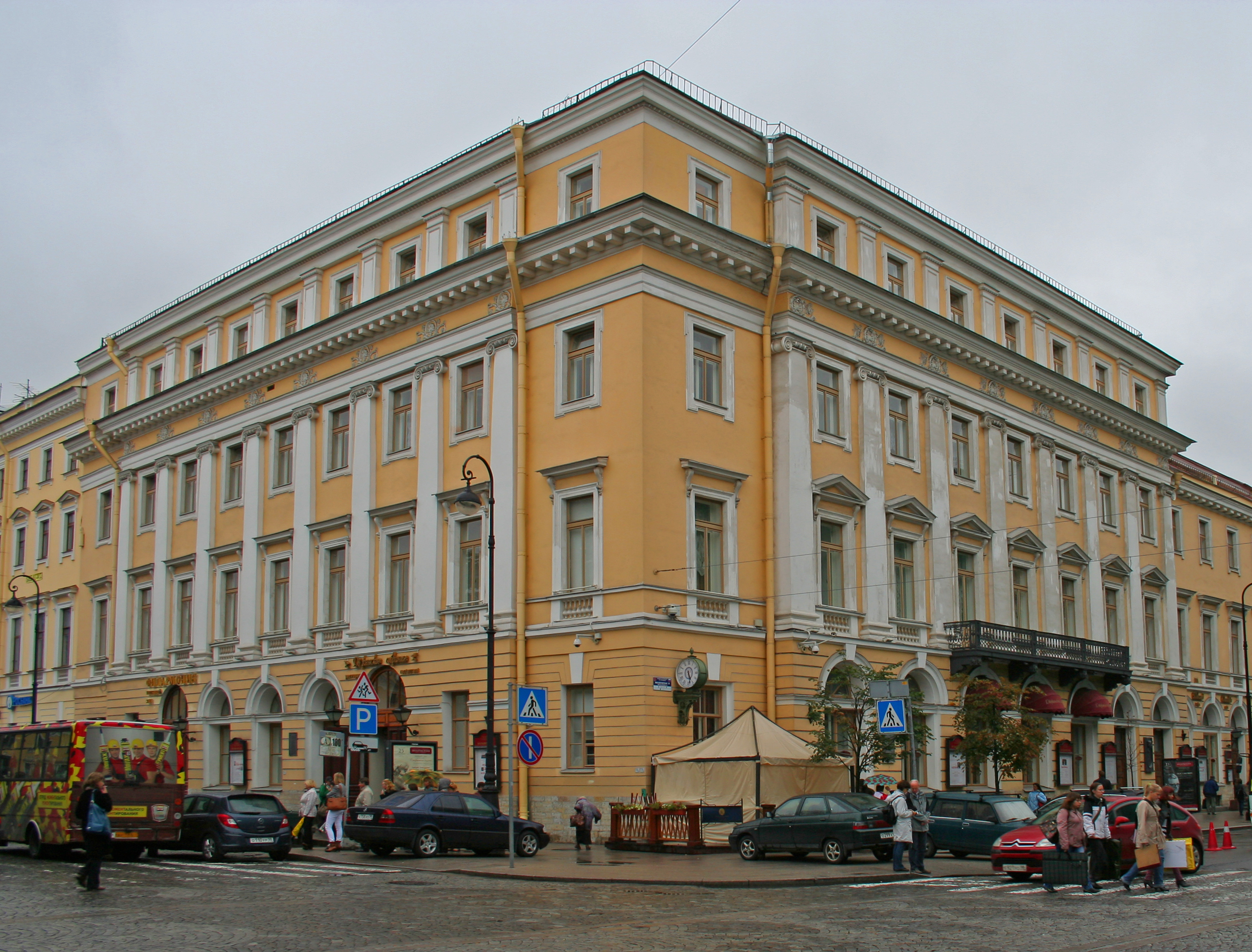
- Interactive map of Saint Petersburg Philharmonia
- Address: Saint Petersburg; Russia
- Coordinates: 59°56′09.66″N 30°19′54.22″E
- Type: Opera

Construction
- Opened: June 12, 1921; 105 years ago

Website
- philharmonia.spb.ru

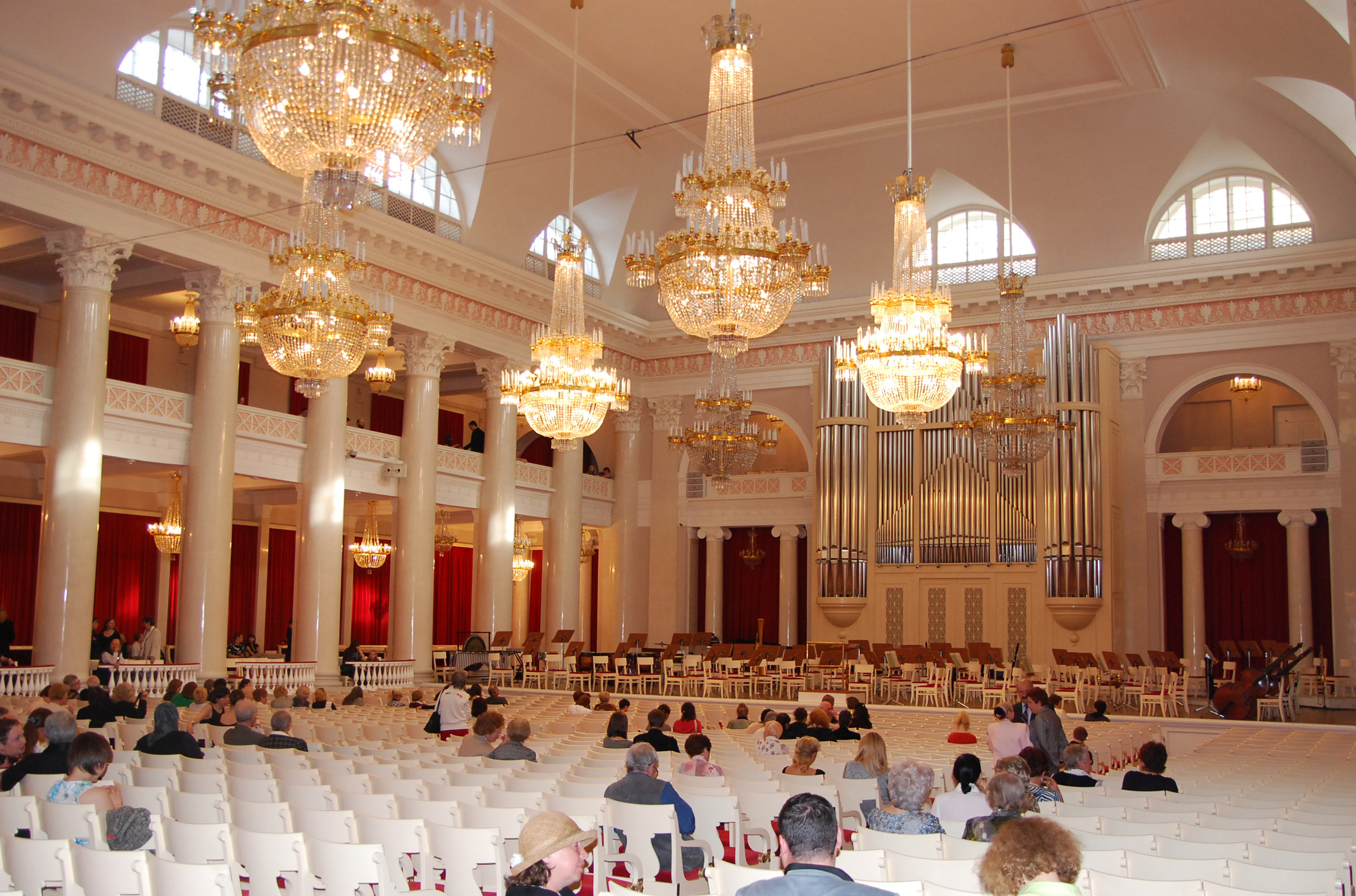
The Bolshoi Zal (Grand Hall) of Saint Petersburg Philharmonia

Saint Petersburg Philharmonia (Russian: Санкт-Петербургская филармония, romanized: Sankt-Peterburgskaya filarmoniya), officially the Saint Petersburg Academic Philharmonia Named After D. D. Shostakovich (Russian: Санкт-Петербургская академическая филармония имени Д. Д. Шостаковича, romanized: Sankt-Peterburgskaya akademicheskaya filarmoniya imeni D. D. Shostakovicha), is a music society located in Saint Petersburg, Russia, and is the name of the building where it is housed. Also there is another one building of Saint Petersburg Philharmonic Society: Malii Zal (Small Hall). The location of the Small Hall is in the city centre. The society now hosts two symphony orchestras: Saint Petersburg Philharmonic Orchestra and Saint Petersburg Academic Symphony Orchestra. The venue is named after Dmitri Shostakovich.

== History ==
- St. Petersburg Philharmonia was established in 1802.
- The building currently housing the Philharmonia was completed 1839. Architect: P. Jacot; and Facade design: C. Rossi.

== Location ==
St. Petersburg Philharmonia is housed in a large building complex.

== Bolshoi Zal ==
The Bolshoi Zal (Russian: Большой зал, meaning the Grand Hall) has a capacity of 1500 seats. It is one of the best known music halls in Russia. F.Liszt, H.Berlioz, R.Wagner, A.Dvořák, J.Sibelius, C.-A.Debussy, R.Strauss, S.Rachmaninoff, S.Prokofiev, D.Shostakovich, A.Scriabin, G.Mahler, A.Rubinstein, K.Schumann, P.Viardo, P.Sarasate, A.Schoenberg, I.Stravinsky, B.Bartok, P.Hindemith and others renowned musicians of the XIX-ХХ centuries performed here, and many works of such exponents of Russian classical tradition as A.Borodin, M.Mussorgsky, P.Tchaikovsky, N.Rimsky-Korsakov, A.Glazunov were premiered here. The hall's acoustics are excellent, but judged by some not to be the best in town.

== Anecdotes ==
It is a well established custom in Bolshoi Zal and elsewhere in Saint Petersburg for a symphony orchestra to play "The Hymn to the Great City", composed by Reinhold Glière, praising the heroic defence in the Siege of Leningrad, as the last piece of encore music.

== Gallery ==
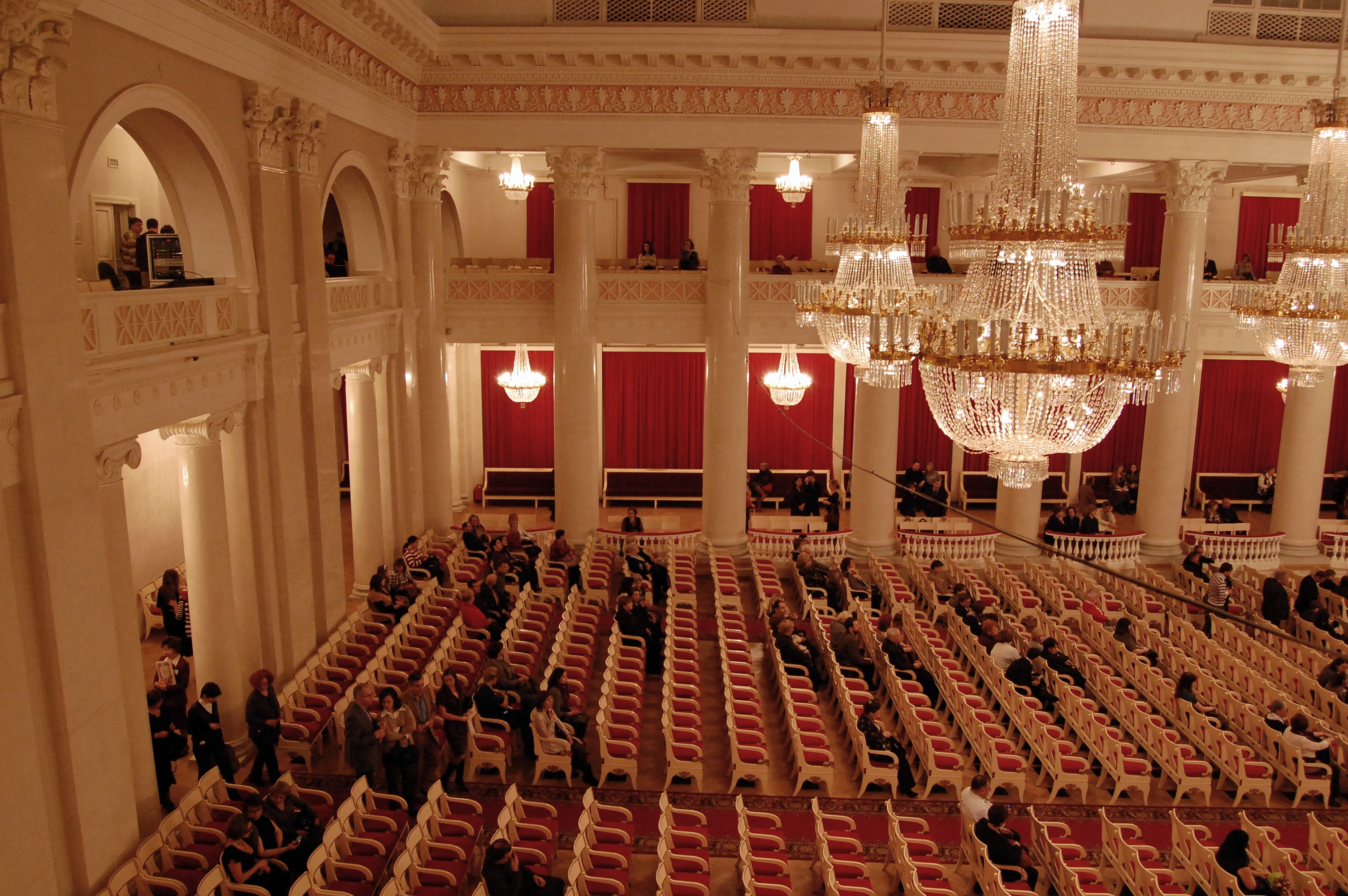

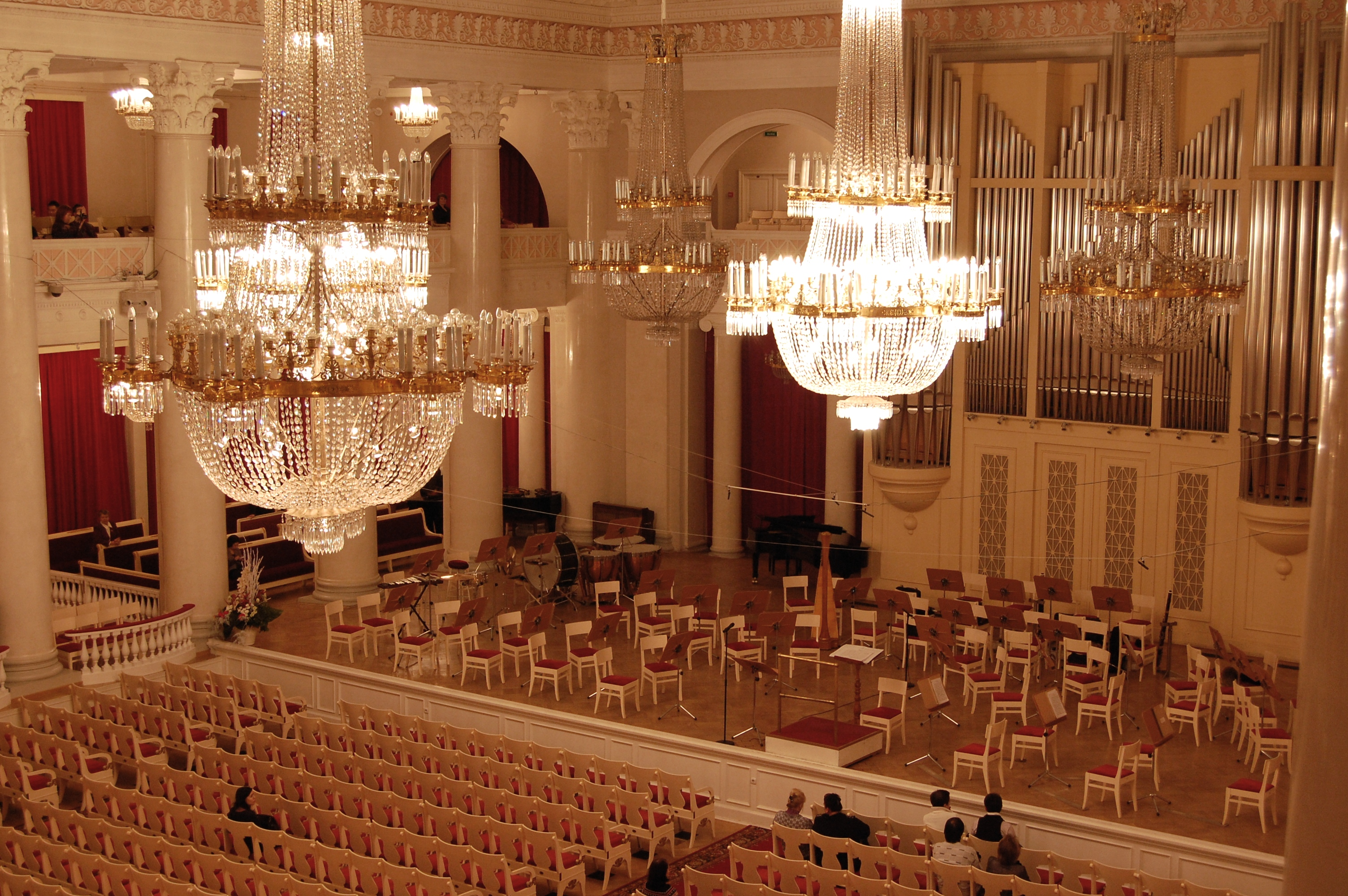

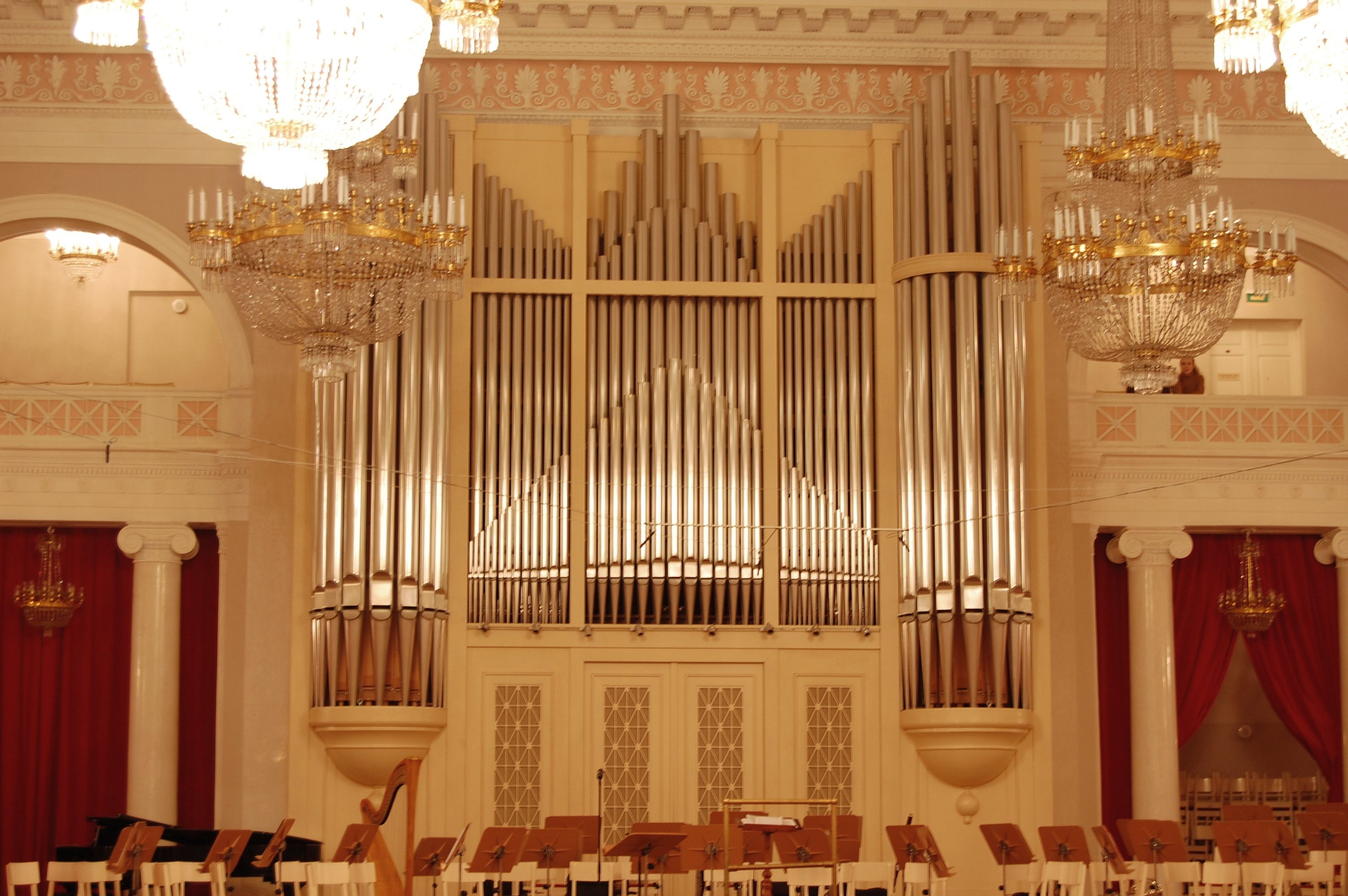

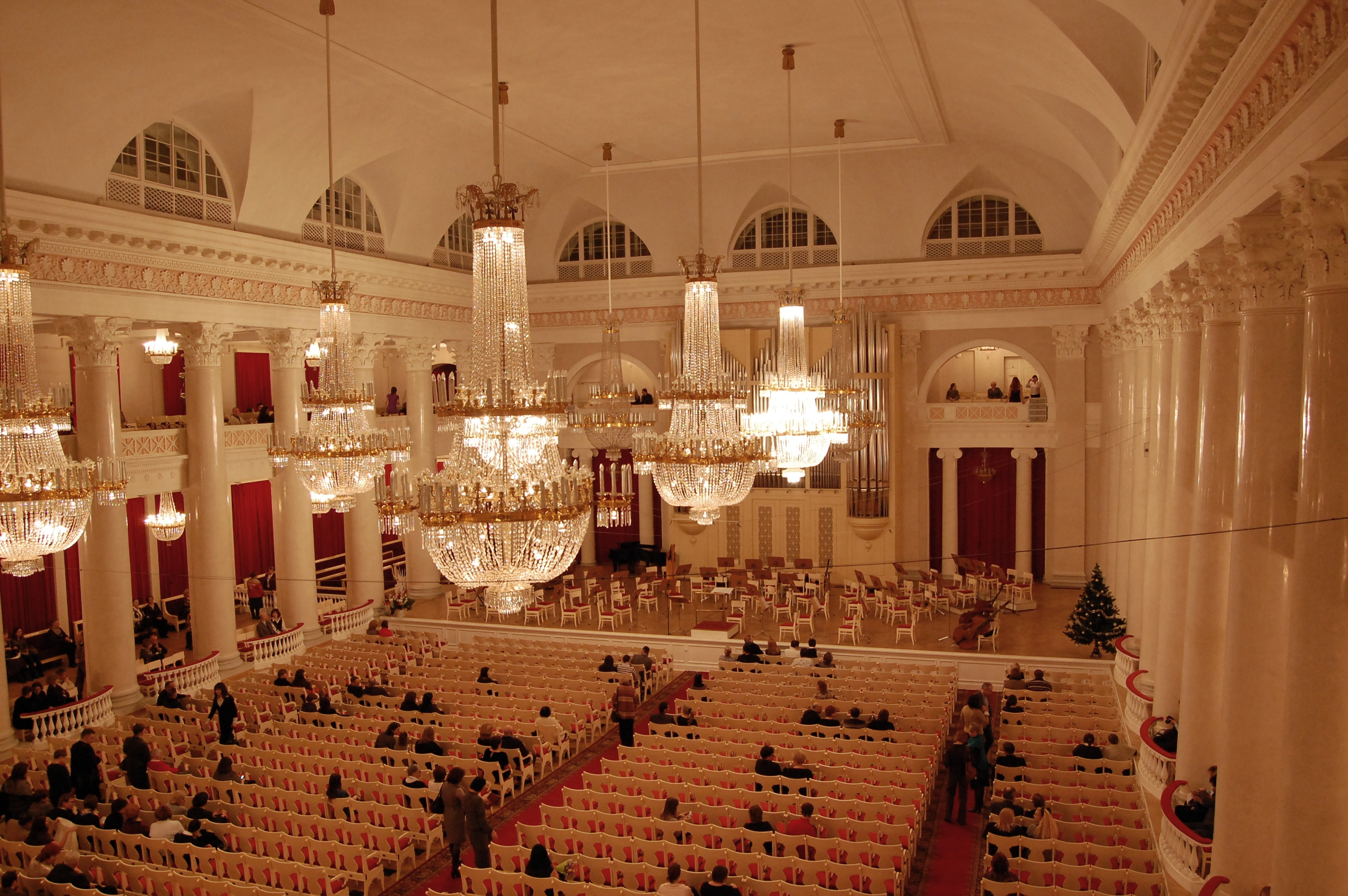

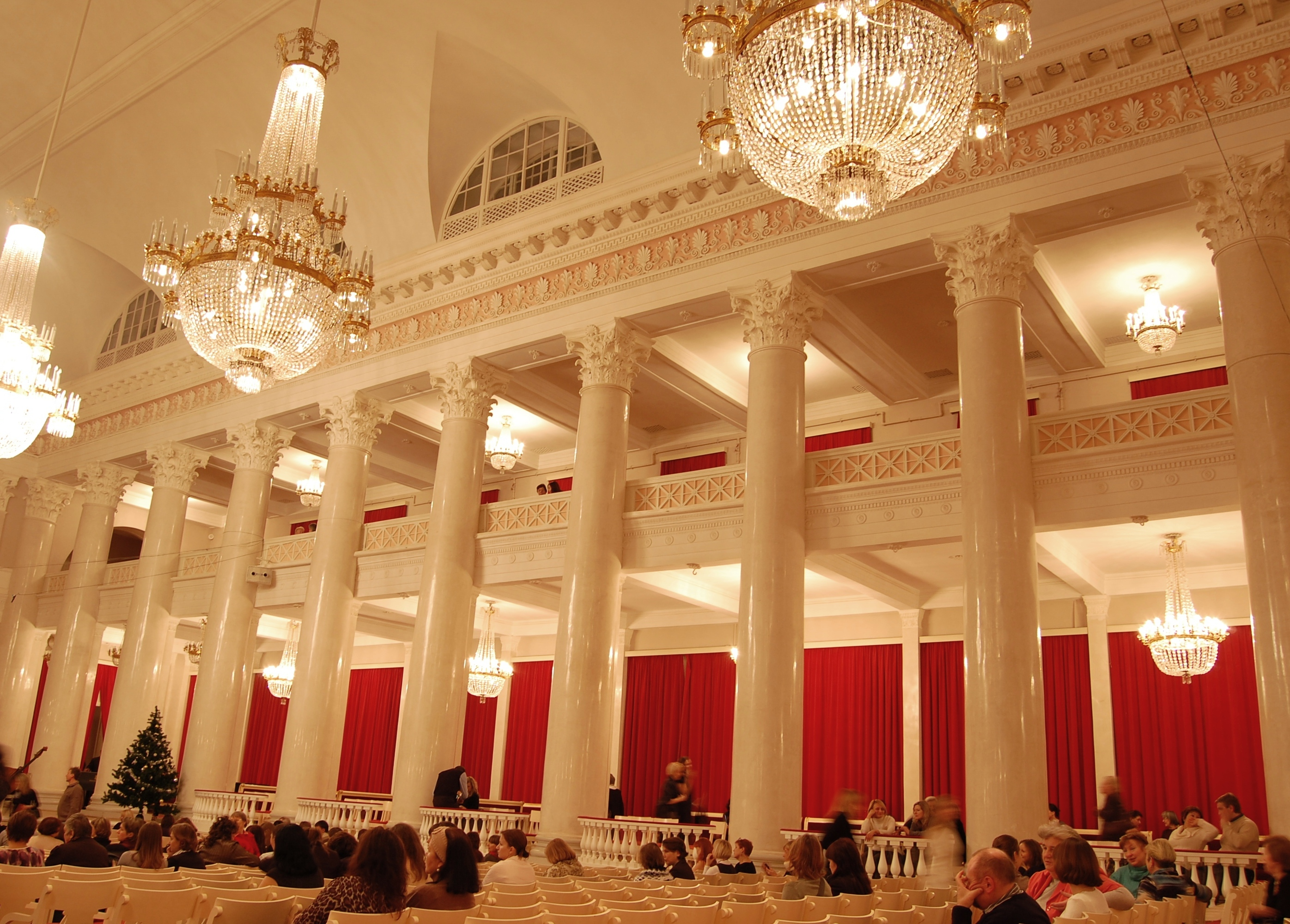

== See also ==
- Mariinsky Theatre
