= Kur (Kursk Oblast) =

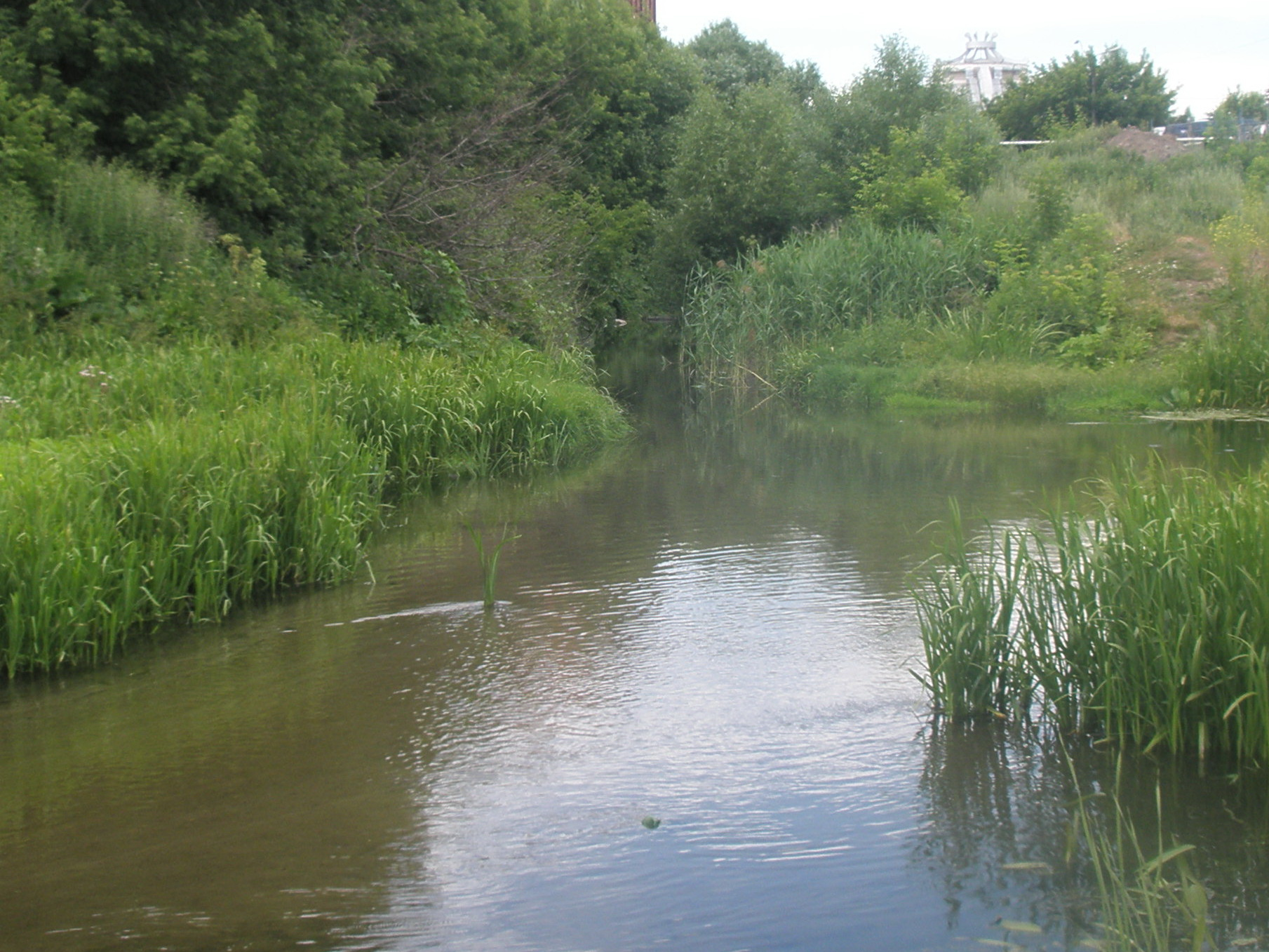
- The mouth of Kur
- Native name: Кур (Russian)

Location
- Country: Russia

Physical characteristics
- Mouth: Tuskar
  - location: Kursk
  - coordinates: 51°43′22″N 36°11′29″E

Basin features
- Progression: Tuskar→ Seym→ Desna→ Dnieper→ Dnieper–Bug estuary→ Black Sea

The Kur (Russian: Кур) is a river in central Russia. It flows through the city of Kursk, where it falls into the Tuskar, which then falls into the Seym. The name relates to a dialect word kur'ya ("long and narrow river bay"), which itself may represent a borrowing from Komi kurya 'bay' (although it has been suggested that the latter is borrowed from Russian).
