= Kursk State Medical University =

Medical university in Kursk, Russia

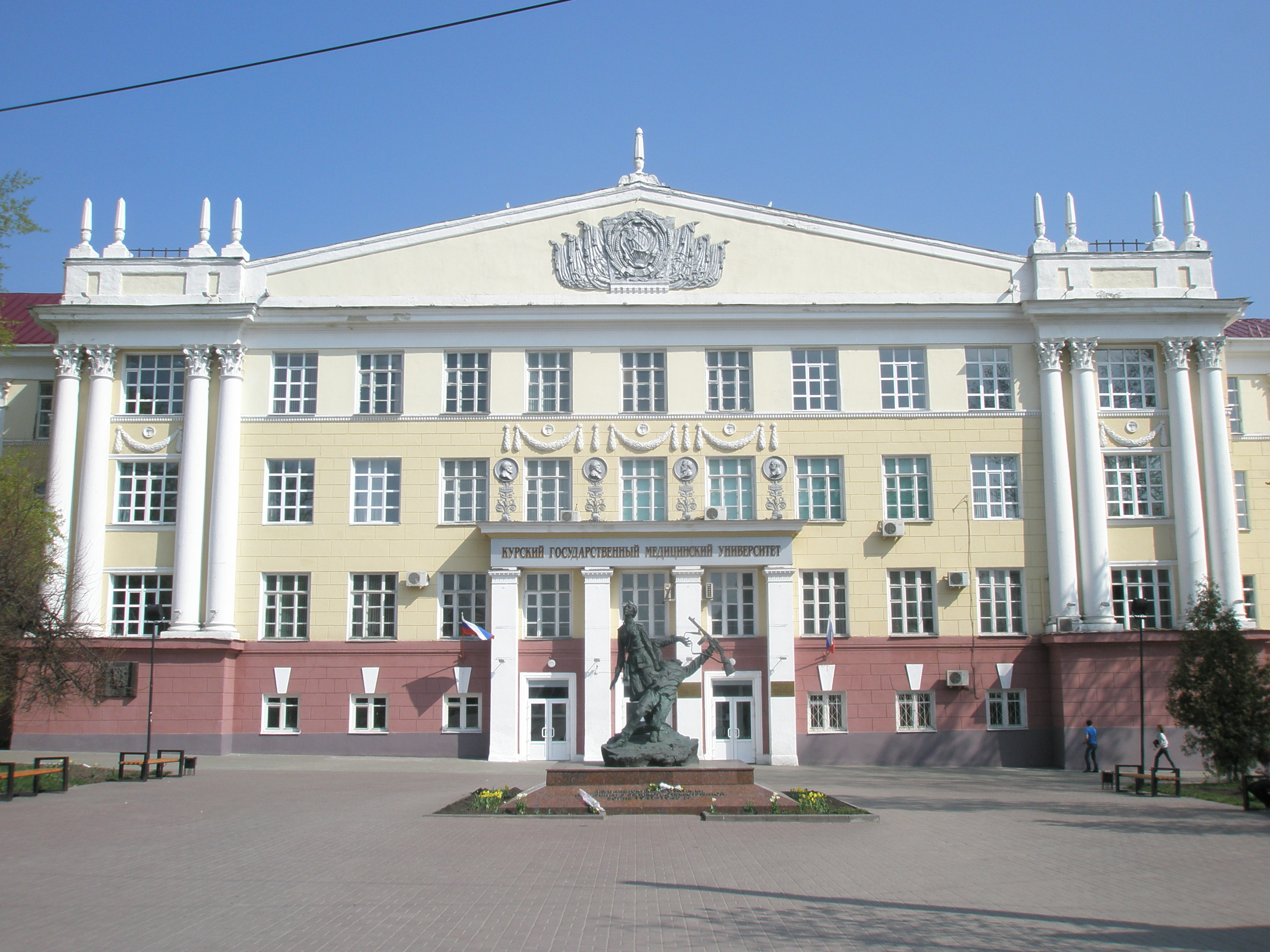
- Type: State University
- Established: 1935
- Location: Kursk, Russia

University rankings

Regional – Overall
- QS Emerging Europe and Central Asia: 196 (2022)

Kursk State Medical University is a Russian medical university located in Kursk, western Russia, established in 1935. In 1994 it was granted university status. In 1985 Kursk State Medical University was awarded an order of the Red Banner of Labour for merits in the training of physicians and pharmaceutists and contribution to the development of public health service and medical science. In 1984 it became the University of the First Category, in 1985 it was awarded an order of the Red Banner of Labour.

== History ==
The decision to create a medical institute was taken in 1935, and the first class of students began their studies in September of that year. The construction of the university buildings was not finished until 1940, which is also when the first group of medical doctors graduated.

Between December 1941 and January 1944, the institute was evacuated to Alma-Ata and formed part of the Kazakh Medical Institute. The institute was re-opened in 1944.

It was established in 1935 as Kursk Medical Institute and was granted university status in 1994.

In 2020 The international Medical Institute was established. The institute is a new division of KSMU, based on the university experience established in the early 90s of the last century.

== Modern practice ==
It was the first university in Russia to offer students a full medical training program in English. It is accredited in 15 foreign countries and students are allowed to take exam in the respective country. There is a representative office in Malaysia.

KSMU is a member of Association of Russian-Chinese Medical Universities. More than 30% of their students are foreign students, coming from 47 countries around the world.

== Rectors ==
2009 - present – Lazarenko Viktor Anatolyevich
