= Alexey Borozdin =

Russian musician (born 1937)

Alexey Ivanovich Borozdin (born March 29, 1937) was a Soviet music teacher from the city of Kursk.

== Early life ==
Alexey Ivanovich Borozdin was born on 29 March, 1937 in the city of Kursk. He graduated from the Kursk Music College in 1957, then studied in the L'vov Music School until 1961, when he dropped out for a teaching career and did not complete his formal music education until 1976, when he graduated from the Novosibirsk Music School.

== Career ==
In 1962, Borozdin moved to Siberia and began teaching cello classes in the local children's music school and had discovered talents of many young cellists. His pupils won more than 70 competitions at all levels, including the International Cello Competition in Cremona, Italy (V. Voropaev, 1997). In 1998, the school, now known countrywide, was taken under the auspices of the city of Novosibirsk.

In 1960s-80s he also played in the Academia orchestra in Akademgorodok, a science campus-town near the city of Novosibirsk, USSR. Following his musical career, in the 1970s-80s Borozdin recovered and transcribed into modern notation over 6000 pages of scores by Josef Mysliveček, a brilliant Czech composer of the 18th century. In 1993, he had been awarded an honorary State title of Distinguished Culture Worker of Russia.

Encouraged by the effect music had on even the most socially problematic students, in 1991 Borozdin set up a school of music and art therapy for mentally handicapped children, which was supported by several international foundations (George Soros Foundation, Alexander Solzhenitsyn Foundation, CAF, etc.). He was also a member of the Russian Guild of Journalists.

== Awards ==
In 1997, Borozdin was awarded one of the first George Soros Russian Zealot Prizes for his work with disabled children.

== Legacy ==
He is considered one of the founders of "habilitation", an emerging field of education concerned with development of skills in children born severely challenged. The results of the school's work is summarized in a book, Studies on Children Habilitation: A History of Borozdin School.

== See also ==
- Music of the Soviet Union

== Books ==
- Studies on Children Habilitation: A History of Borozdin School (Novosibirsk, 2000)
