= Kursk =

City in Kursk Oblast, Russia

Kursk Курск
- City
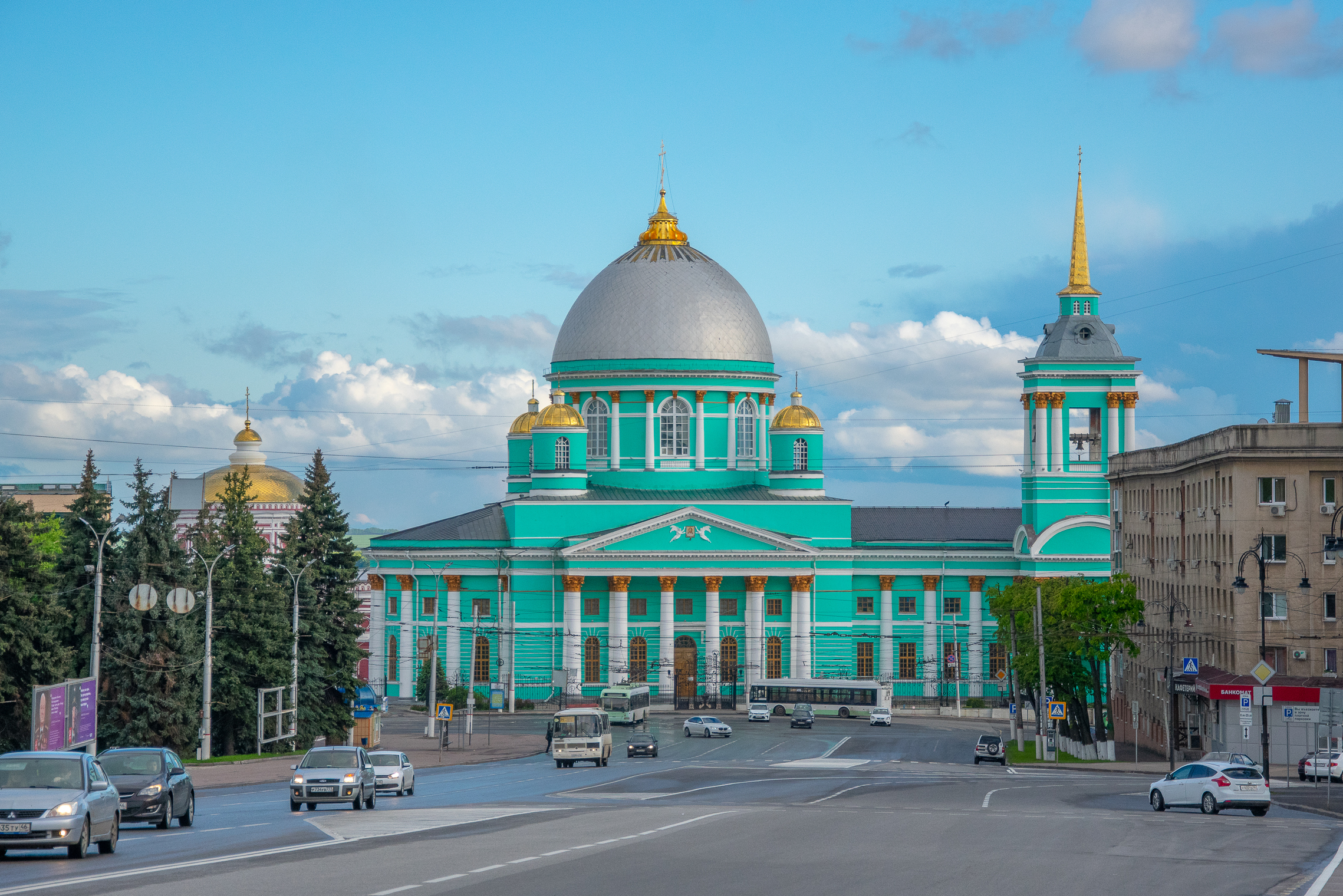
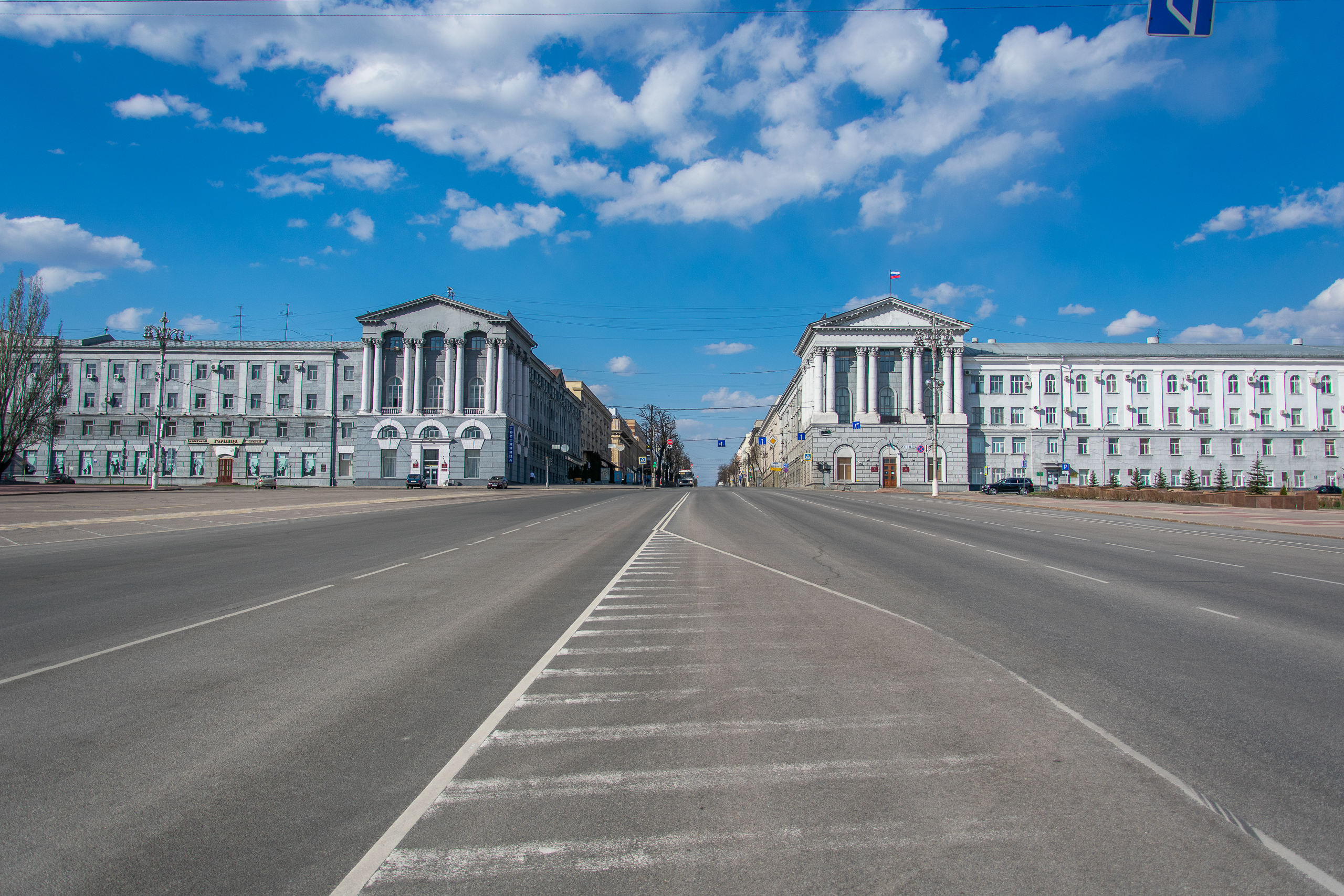
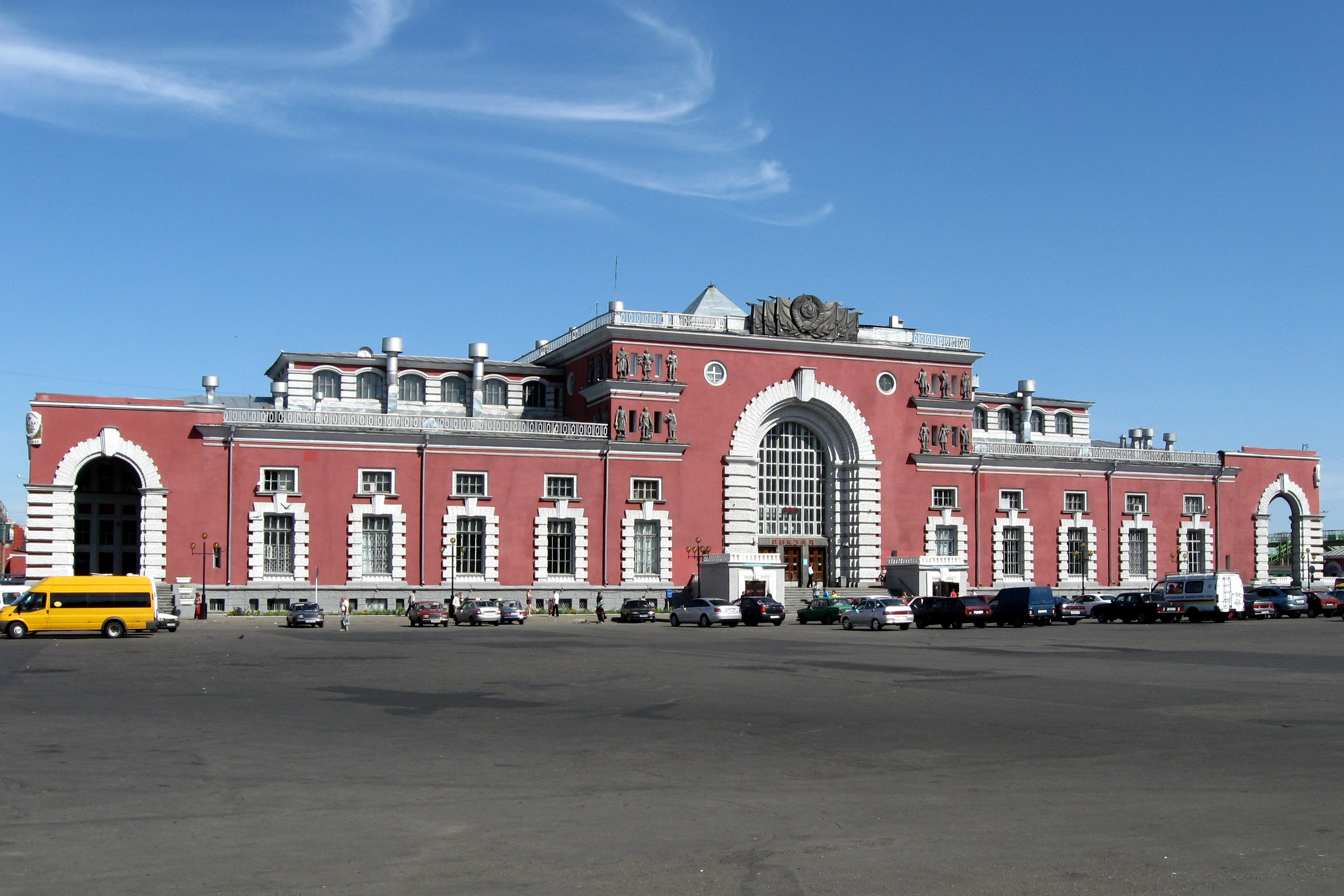
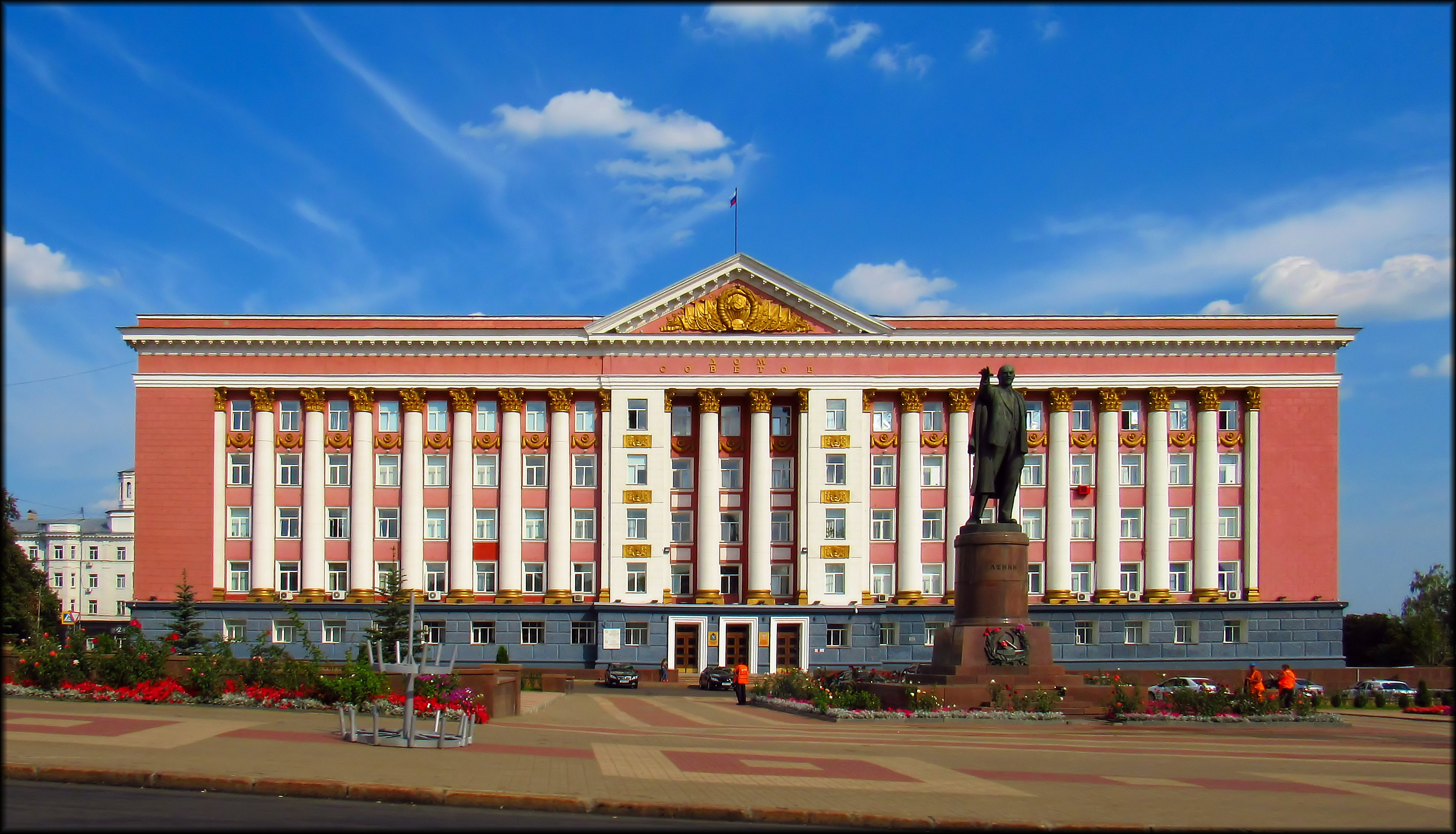
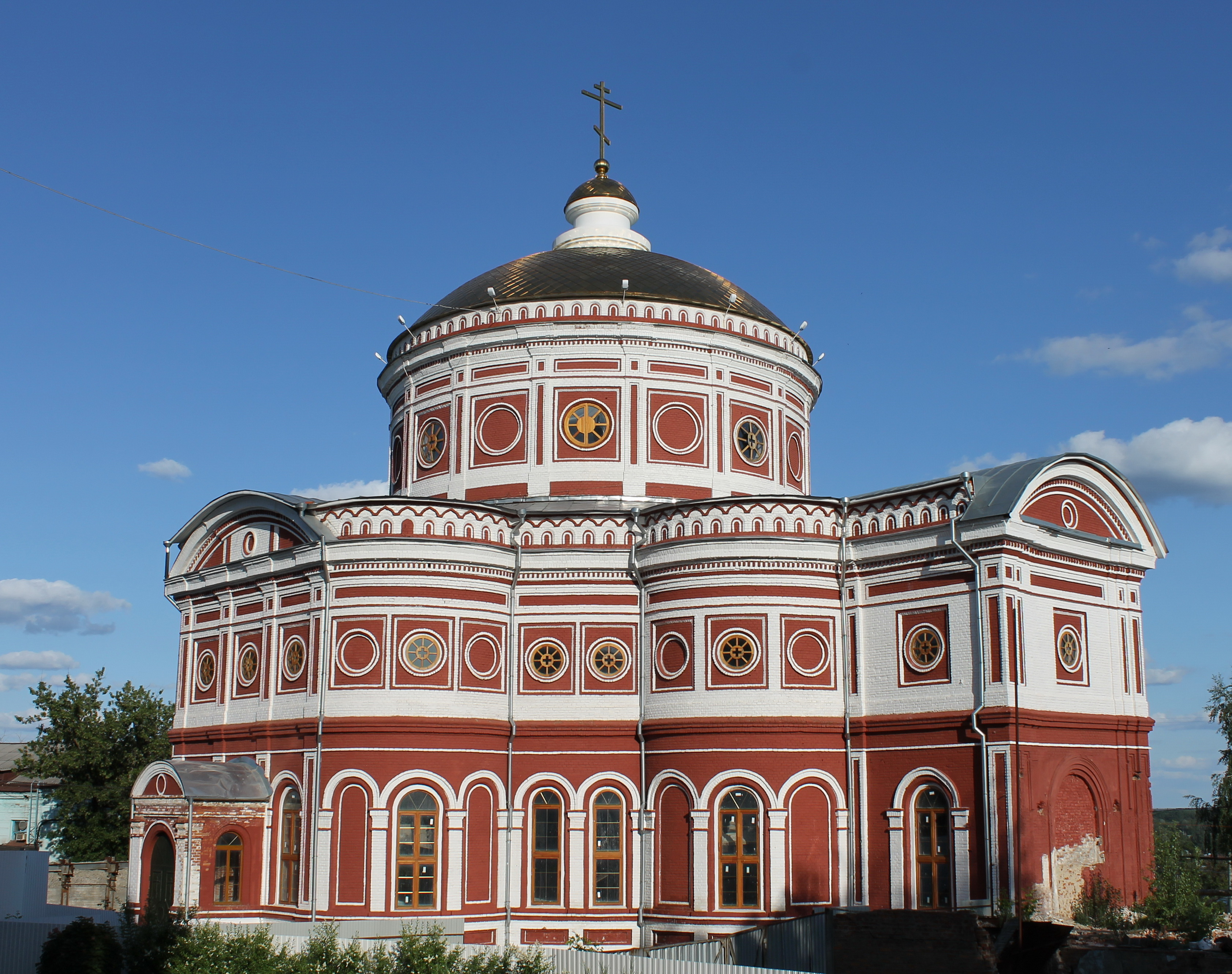
- Cathedral of Our Lady Red Square Main railway station House of Soviets Church of the Resurrection

- Flag Coat of arms
- Interactive map of Kursk
- Location of Kursk Kursk (European Russia) Kursk (Russia) Kursk (Europe)
- Coordinates: 51°43′N 36°11′E
- Country: Russia
- Federal subject: Kursk Oblast
- First mentioned: 1032
- City status since: 1779

Government
  - Body: Kursk City Assembly (Russian: Курское городское Собрание)
  - Head: Orlov Gleb Borisovich

Area
  - Total: 188.75 km^{2} (72.88 sq mi)
- Elevation: 250 m (820 ft)

Population (2010 Census)
  - Total: 415,159
  - Estimate (2025): 434,696 (+4.7%)
  - Rank: 42nd in 2010
  - Density: 2,199.5/km^{2} (5,696.7/sq mi)

Administrative status
  - Subordinated to: city of oblast significance of Kursk
  - Capital of: Kursk Oblast, Kursky District

Municipal status
  - Urban okrug: Kursk Urban Okrug
  - Capital of: Kursk Urban Okrug, Kursky Municipal District
- Time zone: UTC+3 (MSK)
- Postal code: 305000
- Dialing code: +7 4712
- OKTMO ID: 38701000001
- City Day: September 25
- Website: kurskadmin.ru

Kursk (Russian: Курск, IPA: [ˈkursk]) is a city and the administrative center of Kursk Oblast, Russia, located at the confluence of the Kur, Tuskar, and Seym rivers. It has a population of 440,052 (2021 census).

Kursk is the oldest city in the oblast; it is first mentioned in written sources in 1032. Kursk has served as the seat of regional administration since 1779. The area around Kursk was the site of a turning point in the Soviet–German struggle during World War II and the site of the single largest battle in history.

== Etymology ==
The name Kursk is derived from the Kur River, which itself comes from kurya, meaning 'channel'.

== History ==
=== Medieval period ===
Kursk probably emerged as a fortified settlement of the Severians by the 9th century. It became part of Kievan Rus' in the late 10th century and was a city by the early 11th century, when it was one of the strongholds of the Kievan princes on the southeastern border of the realm. The first written record of Kursk dates back to 1032; it is mentioned in the Life of Theodosius of the Caves, as well as the Instruction of Vladimir Monomakh, dating to 1068. It is also mentioned as one of the Severian towns by Prince Igor in The Tale of Igor's Campaign:

Saddle, brother, your swift steeds. As to mine, they are ready, saddled ahead, near Kursk; as to my Kurskers, they are famous knights—swaddled under war-horns, nursed under helmets, fed from the point of the lance; to them the trails are familiar, to them the ravines are known, the bows they have are strung tight, the quivers, unclosed, the sabers, sharpened; themselves, like gray wolves, they lope in the field, seeking for themselves honor, and for their prince, glory.

It is also mentioned in the Primary Chronicle under the year 1095, when a princely throne was temporarily established in Kursk for Iziaslav, a son of Vladimir Monomakh. In the early 12th century, it became the seat of a separate appanage principality. Kursk was raided by the Turkic-speaking Polovtsians in the 12th and 13th centuries. In 1239, the Mongols under Batu Khan devastated the city, but it was soon rebuilt. However, by the end of the 13th century, it had again been devastated by the Golden Horde, after which the city fell into disrepair.

From the 14th to the 16th centuries, Kursk is mentioned in various Russian, Lithuanian, and Crimean Tatar sources, although there is no evidence that it existed as an urban settlement during this period. For instance, Kursk is mentioned in the List of Russian Cities, Far and Near (before 1381), a list of cities belonging to Švitrigaila of Lithuania (1402/1432), and a treaty between Sigismund I and Sahib I Giray (1540), although in these sources, Kursk is mentioned only as a topographical marker and is not connected with any historical events.

=== Modern period ===
Historical population
Year	Pop.	±%
1989	424,239	—
2002	412,442	−2.8%
2010	415,159	+0.7%
2021	440,052	+6.0%

The revival of Kursk is associated with the construction of a new fortress in 1596 during the reign of Feodor I of Russia. From the end of the 16th century, Kursk was the center of an uyezd. In 1604, it was captured by supporters of False Dmitry I, a pretender to the Russian throne. The people of Kursk took part in the Uprising of Bolotnikov of 1606–1607. At the same time, its inhabitants refused to recognize the authority of Dmitry Shuisky as tsar, instead recognizing False Dmitry II, another pretender.

During the Polish–Russian War of 1609–1618, it withstood sieges by the Polish–Lithuanian Commonwealth in 1612, 1616, and 1617, as well as a siege in 1634 during the Russo–Polish War of 1632–1634. It was also subject to raids by the Crimean Khanate in 1646 and 1647, as well as attacks by the Nogai Horde in 1615. Following the construction of the Belgorod Line, Kursk became one of the largest trade and craft centers in southern Russia.

Residents of Oryol and other southern Russian cities were resettled in Kursk (by 1678, 2,800 had been resettled). The city developed due to its advantageous geographical position on the shortest route from Moscow to the Crimea and from Moscow to Kiev. It was an important center of the corn trade with Ukraine and hosted an important fair, which took place annually under the walls of the monastery of Our Lady of Kursk. Thousands of residents died to an epidemic in 1690.

Kursk was successively part of the Kiev Governorate (1708–1727), Belgorod Governorate (1727–1779), and Kursk Viceroyalty (1779–1797). It received city status in 1779. It became the administrative center of Kursk Governorate in 1797. In the 18th century, it was the most important center of transit trade between Central and South Russia and Little Russia. By the mid-18th century, it was among the ten largest Russian cities.

After a fire in 1781 devastated Kursk, a new plan for the city was developed in which a market center would be placed in the central square, known as the Red Square. In 1768, the Voskresensko-Ilinskaya Church was built (Russian: Воскресенско-Ильинская церковь). In 1778, both the baroque Sergiev Cathedral and Trinity-Sergius Cathedral were completed. The city opened its first school for nobility in 1783. A men's gymnasium was opened in 1808 and a seminary in 1817. A women's gymnasium was opened in 1872.

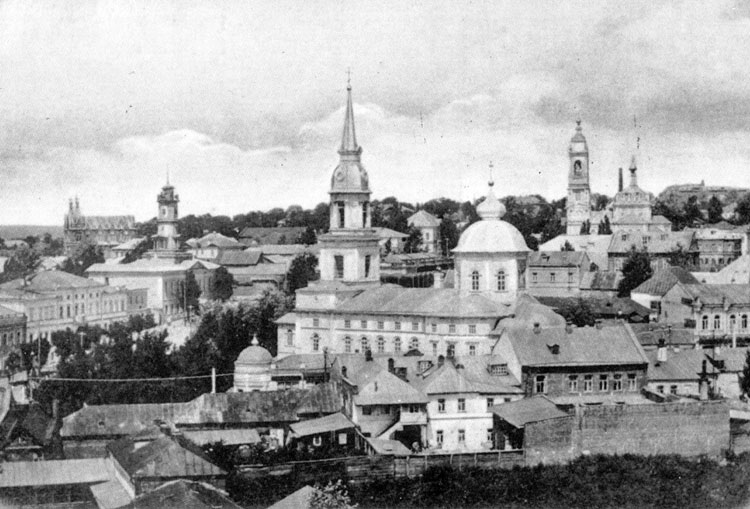
Pre-1917 view of Kursk

==== 20th century ====
At the beginning of the 20th century, Kursk played a dominant role in the food industry (Kvilitsu AK, one of the largest breweries in Russia, operated in Kursk) and in other industries; in the 1900s, the city had 4 sitoproboynye shops (of which the largest was the Tikhonov works, whose products were exported to Germany, Austria-Hungary, etc.). There were several engineering enterprises operating in Kursk (in 1914 there were seven, including a railroad one). The working conditions in the factories of Kursk were harsh, and workers' strikes were frequent (for instance, the workers at the sugar mill went on strike in 1901–1903). The Kursk workers also participated in the general political strike during the 1905 Russian Revolution.

After the October Revolution, Soviet power was established in Kursk on 26 November [O.S. 9 December] 1917. On 28 November 1918, the Provisional Workers' and Peasants' Government of Ukraine was established in Kursk. On 20 September 1919, during the Russian Civil War, the city was occupied by the Armed Forces of South Russia. On the night of 17–18 November, it was retaken by the Red Army. In 1934, it became the center of Kursk Oblast within the Russian SFSR.

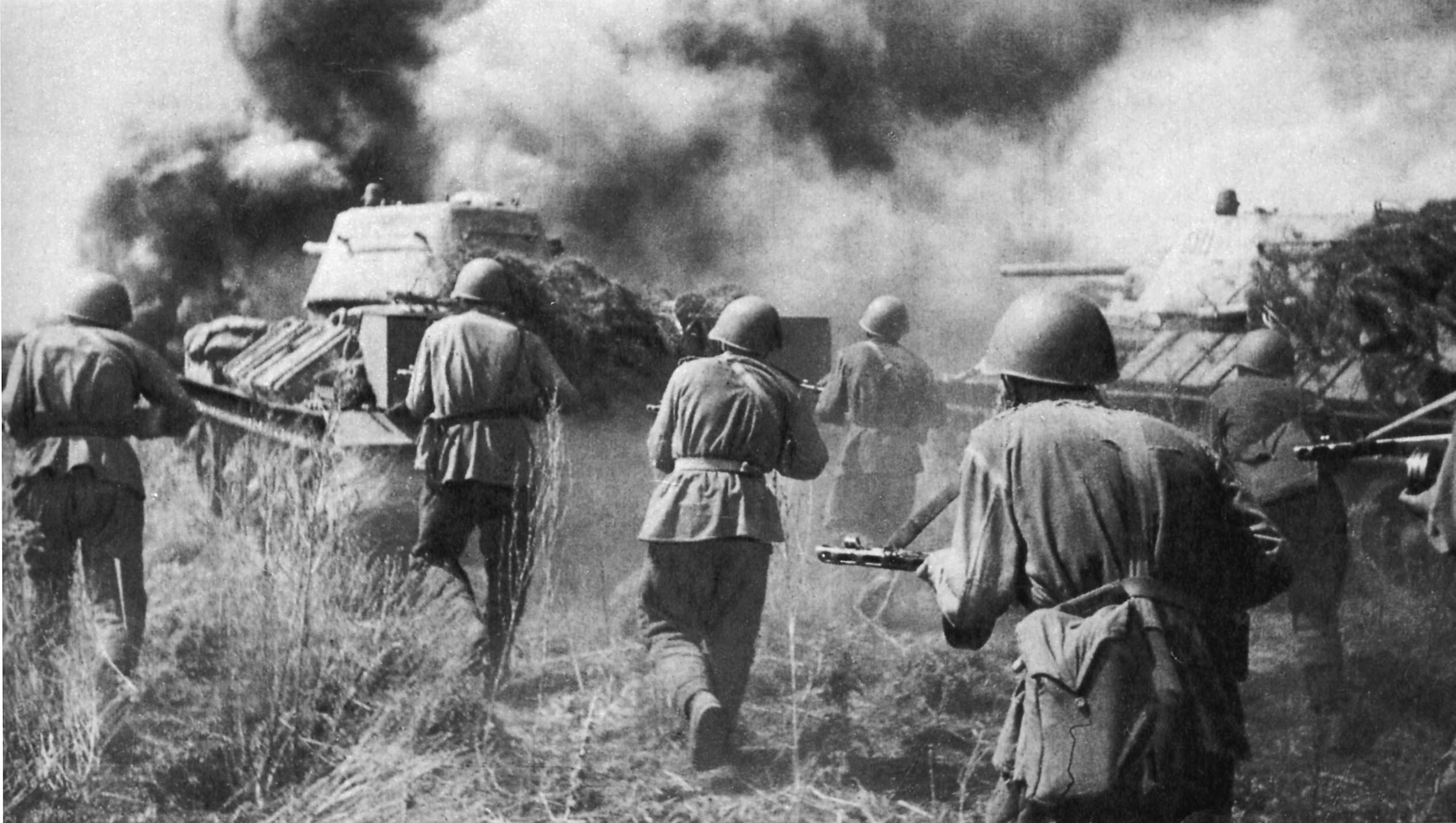
Soviet troops and T-34 tanks advancing during the Battle of Kursk.

The Soviet government valued Kursk for its rich deposits of iron ore and developed it into one of the major railroad hubs in the Russian southwest. In 1932, Yamskaya Sloboda was incorporated into the city. In 1935, Kursk got its first tram system. Sometime in the 1930s, the area of the city of Kursk was divided into Leninsky District (the left bank of the Kura River), Dzerzhinsky District (the right bank of the Kura River) and Kirov District (Yamskaya Sloboda). In 1937, Stalinsky District was formed at the southern outskirts of the city. During the Great Terror, some two thousand were shot and buried in the Solyanka park in Kursk.

During World War II, Kursk was occupied by Germany between 4 November 1941 and 8 February 1943. The Stalag 384 prisoner-of-war camp was based in the city from 1942 before its relocation to Konotop in 1943. The occupiers also operated a Jewish forced labour battalion in the city. In July 1943, the Germans launched Operation Citadel in an attempt to recapture Kursk. During the resulting Battle of Kursk, the village of Prokhorovka near Kursk became the center of a major armoured engagement – the Battle of Prokhorovka – between Soviet and German forces: one of the largest tank battles in history. Operation Citadel was the last major German offensive against the Soviet Union. Kursk was subjected to heavy German air raids.

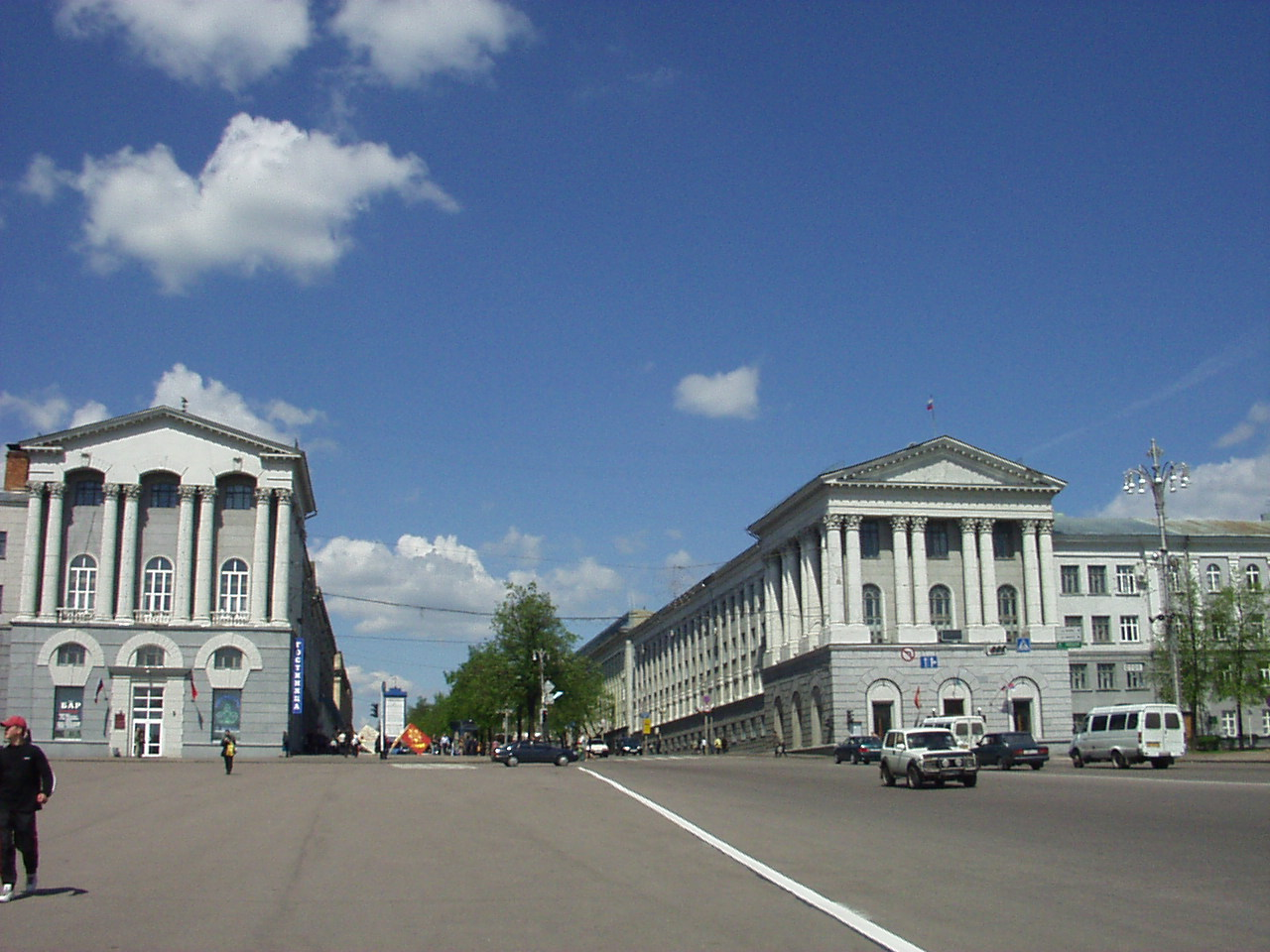
Stalin-era buildings flanking Kursk's Red Square

Rebuilding efforts in the city began in February 1944. In 1945, it was included in the list of 15 cities subject to priority restoration by decree of the Council of People's Commissars. The cultural life recovered as well: on 19 February, a cinema was reopened, and on 27 February a drama theatre. By 1950, the urban economy had been completely restored. In 1953, the tram system began operating again. On 17 August 1956, Stalinsky District was renamed Promishlenost District, and Dzerzhinsky District was abolished and its territory divided between Promishlenost and Leninsky Districts.

In 1992, the remains of those executed during the Great Terror were reburied in a common grave with a memorial in Solyanka Park.

==== 21st century ====
In 2009, for the first time in 90 years at the site of the Theotokos of Kursk, the most revered icon in the Russian Orthodox Church, received the name Hodigitria Russian diaspora.

Until 2010, Kursk had the status of historical settlement, but the Russian Ministry of Culture deprived the city of this status on 29 July 2010 in resolution No. 418/339.

On 29 October 2011, for the first time in 30 years, the city opened a new firehouse for the protection of the Central District, with modern equipment. In 2012, Kursk celebrated its 980th anniversary.

== Geography ==
=== Urban layout ===
Kursk was originally built as a fortress city on a hill dominating the plain. The settlement was surrounded on three sides by the Kur River (Amur basin) to the west and the Tuskar river to the south and east. Forest thickets approached it from the north. By 1603, Kursk had become the military, administrative, and economic centre of a vast territory in the south of the country. The new fortress was built under the leadership of governors Ivan Polev and Nelyub Ogaryov. The Kursk fortress was given a particularly important role, since in these places the Tatars of the Crimean Khanate, who made regular slave raids on Russia, traditionally crossed the Seym river, and their main road, the Muravsky Trail, passed east of the city. In this regard, Kursk, despite not being part of the Belgorod Protection Line, became one of the most important fortresses in the southern region. In 1616, there were 1600 people in the Kursk garrison.

By 1782, the buildings of Kursk were located on the heights of two hills and in the valley of the Kur River. There were meadows and pastures on the banks of the river. The city streets that laid on the slopes of the hills had steep ascents and descents in many places, and travel in the city was made uphill almost everywhere. The presence of six ravines that cut through the hill of the Nagornaya part significantly hampered the development of Kursk. Heavy rains sometimes eroded the soil of the hillsides and formed ditches and gullies. The plan of Kursk in 1782 was to be implemented in the conditions of the existing buildings of the city. In the 1880s, Kursk was already a significant settlement. It housed 14 churches, not including the churches of the Znamensky Monastery. Most of them were of stone and built around the time period of 1730 to 1786. By 1782, Kursk was composed almost entirely of wooden houses. Fences and services went out in the direction of the streets, and houses were hidden in the depths of the courtyards. Many streets and lanes were no wider than 2.5 to 3 metres. The only stone mansion that has survived in present time after redevelopment is located at the corner of Pionerov (former Troitskaya) and Gaidar (former Zolotarevskaya) streets.

There were powerful fortifications and natural obstacles in the center of Kursk. Settlements were located around the city. Cossack and Pushkarnaya were on the slopes of the hills and in the valley of the Kur River, Yamskaya – away from the city, on the plain. At that time, Yamskaya was a small village concentrated around the Vvedenskaya church. The settlements Streletskaya and Kozhevenny were located in the lowlands and were often flooded by the Tuskar river.

The principle of regularity was applied in the structure of the general layout of Kursk. On the plan of 1782, Kursk is shown as consisting of two parts: the cities of Nagornaya and Zakurnaya. They are separated from each other by the Kura river valley. Each of these parts is divided into regular rectangular blocks located on both sides of the planned main streets – Bolshaya Moskovskaya (Lenina) and Kherson (Dzerzhinsky). In the city Nagornaya part, 19 streets were planned, and in the Zakurnaya part, 24 streets. At the entrance to the city, at the beginning of both Moskovskaya and Kherson streets, it was planned to arrange the entrance squares. The remains of the former prison were destroyed, and the moat was buried according to the plan of the city, which was most confirmed in 1782. A square called “red ” was made in its place. The construction of small areas was also envisaged for a number of churches throughout the city. The territory of both parts of the city, where it was not limited by rivers and deep ravines, was planned to be surrounded by a ditch and a rampart. The area occupied by the city according to the new plan totalled approximately 3060 thousand square fathoms, which corresponds to 12 square kilometres. The main drawback of the project was that it did not take into account the complex relief of the Kursk area. The structure of the plan, correct and orderly on paper, required significant revision, additions and even minor changes. The numerous proposals of the Kursk governors A.A. Prozorovsky, F.N. Nicknames, A.B. Debalmena, and A.A. Bekleshov, included in the city planning, made it possible to bring the scheme closer to reality.

The purpose of the redevelopment was complete accounting and control of residents. For this, the city was divided under the governor Alexander Bekleshov into 4 parts, each of which was managed by a private bailiff. The redevelopment of the city was begun by the provincial surveyor Ivan Fedorovich Bashilov, the district surveyor Ivan Shoshin, the provincial architects Vasily Yakovlev, Lavrenty Kalinovsky. Since 1783, decisions on redevelopment issues were made by a commission in the amount of 3 officials, namely the provincial land surveyor, the mayor and the city magistrate's ratman. The new urban structure – a rectangular quarter with residents of the same income, one estate – greatly facilitated the accounting and control of the inhabitants by the authorities. The center of the city, built up with stone buildings, was to take on a new, "ceremonial" appearance. These requirements were met by the resettlement of residents on the basis of class. The most significant government buildings erected in Kursk by the end of the 18th century. In accordance with the plan confirmed by Catherine II, these were public places, a prison, a guest house, the main public school, and a house of a noble assembly. The construction of the bank office, magistrate and post office was located along the red lines of the development of Florovskaya and Moskovskaya streets. The general plan for the development of Kursk was adopted in 1782. It was built according to a regular plan with a clear rectangular grid of streets. It was based on the two main streets Moskovskaya and Khersonskaya (now Lenin and Dzerzhinsky), converging at right angles on Red Square.

A city hospital, a regimental infirmary, an almshouse, and salt shops were built. The most notable private houses of the late 18th century that have survived to this day are the houses of the landowner Denisiev (corner of Sadovaya and Semyonovskaya) and the official Puzanov (Dzerzhinsky, 70), as well as the "house of the treasurer" (corner of Radishcheva and Marata). The main significance of the general city plan of 1782 is that for about 150 years it remained the only document that determined the development of the city of Kursk. The next master plan appeared only in 1947, after the Second World War. The number of residential buildings from 1786 to 1836 increased insignificantly, from 1989 houses to 2782 houses. If any building did not correspond to the confirmed plan, it was demolished.

The bulk of government buildings (offices, post office, magistrate, prison, drinking houses, pharmacies, hospital) were built at the end of the 18th century. At the beginning of the 19th century, construction was carried out: offices were repaired, a new prison was built, and storm sewer grooves were laid along stone pavements, which almost half of Kursk's streets had. The streets were named Sergievskaya, Tuskarnaya Naberezhnaya, Staraya, Novaya Preobrazhensky, General's line, Soldier's, Druzhininskaya, Pastukhovskaya. Zolotarevskaya, Avraamovskaya, and so on. On 10 July 1808, five settlements (Sloboda) of Kursk (Podyacheskaya, Soldatskaya, Gorodovy Sluzhby, Malyrossiyskaya, Rassylnaya) became part of the city. The settlements surrounding Kursk (Kazatskaya, Pushkarskaya, Yamskaya, Streletskaya) became part of the city only after 1917. The Kozhevennaya Sloboda disappeared from the city plan by the 1940s. The layout of the settlements was as regular as in the provincial center. Urban pasture land was located between the Seim River, on the border of the 3rd district of Kursk and the Big Post Road from Kursk to Oboyan.

=== Climate ===
Climate data for Kursk (1991–2020, extremes 1833–present)
Month	Jan	Feb	Mar	Apr	May	Jun	Jul	Aug	Sep	Oct	Nov	Dec	Year
Record high °C (°F)	8.5 (47.3)	9.5 (49.1)	22.5 (72.5)	28.1 (82.6)	32.6 (90.7)	36.5 (97.7)	37.2 (99.0)	38.8 (101.8)	33.0 (91.4)	26.8 (80.2)	17.7 (63.9)	10.2 (50.4)	38.8 (101.8)
Mean daily maximum °C (°F)	−3.5 (25.7)	−2.6 (27.3)	3.1 (37.6)	12.9 (55.2)	20.0 (68.0)	23.5 (74.3)	25.5 (77.9)	24.8 (76.6)	18.3 (64.9)	10.6 (51.1)	2.5 (36.5)	−2.1 (28.2)	11.1 (52.0)
Daily mean °C (°F)	−5.9 (21.4)	−5.5 (22.1)	−0.3 (31.5)	8.2 (46.8)	14.8 (58.6)	18.4 (65.1)	20.3 (68.5)	19.4 (66.9)	13.5 (56.3)	6.9 (44.4)	0.1 (32.2)	−4.3 (24.3)	7.1 (44.8)
Mean daily minimum °C (°F)	−8.3 (17.1)	−8.2 (17.2)	−3.4 (25.9)	3.9 (39.0)	9.8 (49.6)	13.5 (56.3)	15.4 (59.7)	14.4 (57.9)	9.3 (48.7)	3.8 (38.8)	−2.0 (28.4)	−6.6 (20.1)	3.5 (38.3)
Record low °C (°F)	−34.5 (−30.1)	−35.3 (−31.5)	−32.6 (−26.7)	−15.6 (3.9)	−6.1 (21.0)	0.4 (32.7)	6.1 (43.0)	1.9 (35.4)	−3.9 (25.0)	−17.4 (0.7)	−25.0 (−13.0)	−32.7 (−26.9)	−35.3 (−31.5)
Average precipitation mm (inches)	47 (1.9)	41 (1.6)	45 (1.8)	41 (1.6)	56 (2.2)	65 (2.6)	78 (3.1)	47 (1.9)	63 (2.5)	58 (2.3)	44 (1.7)	47 (1.9)	632 (24.9)
Average extreme snow depth cm (inches)	14 (5.5)	20 (7.9)	15 (5.9)	1 (0.4)	0 (0)	0 (0)	0 (0)	0 (0)	0 (0)	0 (0)	2 (0.8)	7 (2.8)	20 (7.9)
Average rainy days	9	8	9	15	16	17	17	13	16	16	14	11	161
Average snowy days	23	21	15	4	0.4	0	0	0	0.4	3	13	22	102
Average relative humidity (%)	86	83	78	66	61	68	69	67	74	80	87	87	76
Mean monthly sunshine hours	46.9	74.0	144.5	204.2	286.2	316.5	314.7	287.0	188.4	113.4	59.6	31.4	2,066.8
Source 1: Pogoda.ru.net
Source 2: NOAA

== Administrative and municipal status ==
Kursk is the administrative center of the oblast and, within the framework of administrative divisions, it also serves as the administrative center of Kursky District, even though it is not a part of it. As an administrative division, it is incorporated separately as the city of oblast significance of Kursk—an administrative unit with the status equal to that of the districts. As a municipal division, the city of oblast significance of Kursk is incorporated as Kursk Urban Okrug.

== Economy and infrastructure ==
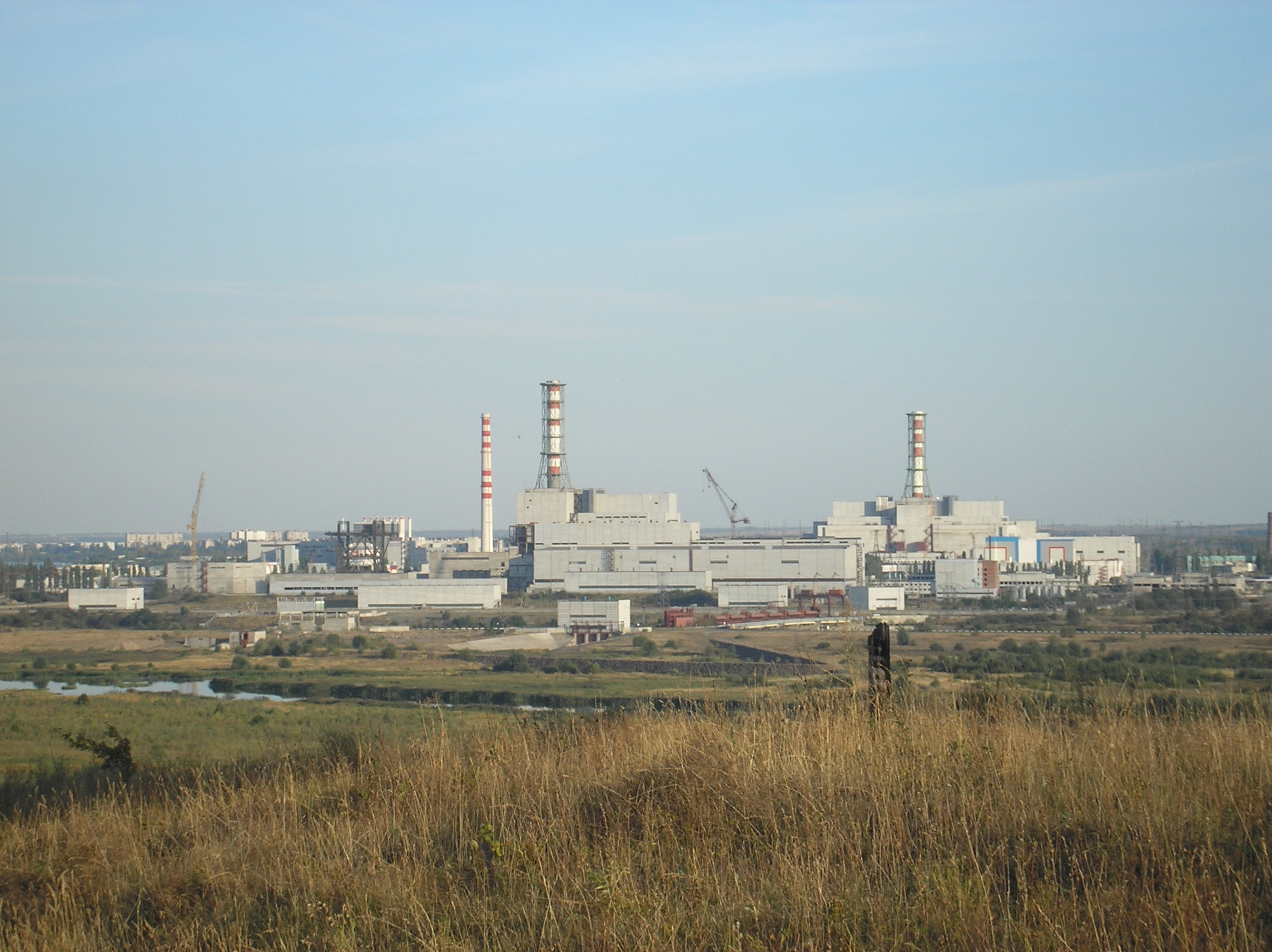
Kursk Nuclear Power Plant

In addition to its importance as an administrative hub, Kursk is important as an industrial centre. Activity focuses on iron-based industry, the chemical sector and a large food processing industry, reflecting the richness of agriculture in the surrounding "Black Earth" region.

Particularly noteworthy is the so-called Kursk Magnetic Anomaly (Russian: Курская магнитная аномалия), the world's largest known iron-ore reserve, where the iron content of the ore ranges from 35% up to 60%.

In Kurchatov, some 40 km (25 mi) to the south-west, is the Kursk Nuclear Power Plant, incorporating four RBMK-1000 ("High Power Channel-type Reactor") (Russian: Реактор Большой Мощности Канальный) reactors similar to those implicated in the 1986 Chernobyl disaster. The oldest of the Kursk reactors has been operational since 1977, and the newest of them since 1986.

== Attractions ==
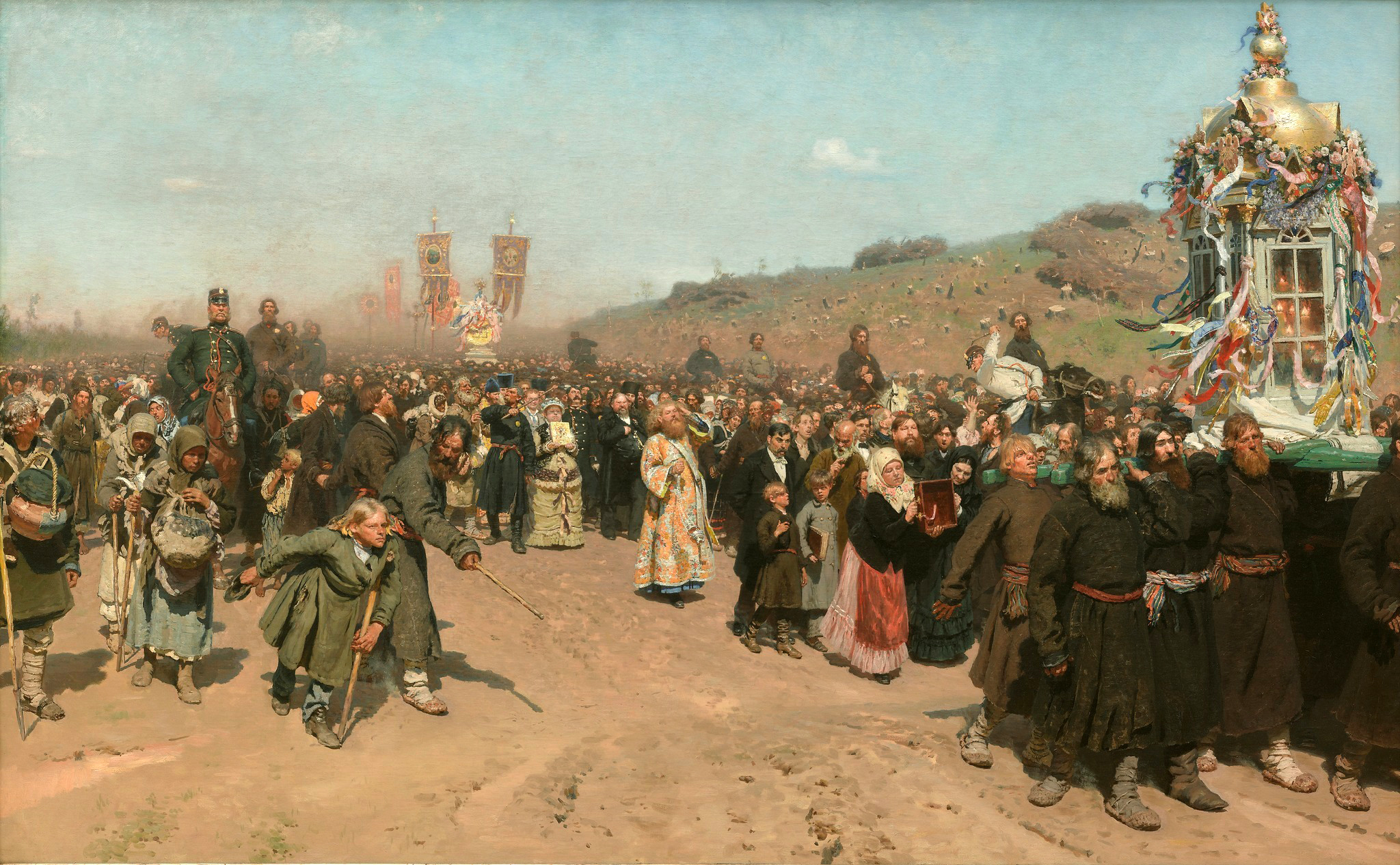
Religious Procession in Kursk Province, painting by Ilya Repin (1880–1883)

The oldest building in Kursk is the upper church of the Trinity Monastery, a good example of the transition style characteristic of Peter the Great's early reign. The oldest lay building is the so-called Romodanovsky Chamber, although it was erected in all probability in the mid-18th century, when the Romodanovsky family had ceased to exist.

The city cathedral was built between 1752 and 1778 in the splendid Baroque style and was decorated so richly that many art historians attributed it to Bartolomeo Rastrelli. Although Rastrelli's authorship is out of the question, the cathedral is indeed the most notable monument of Elizabethan Baroque not to be commissioned by the imperial family or built in the imperial capital.

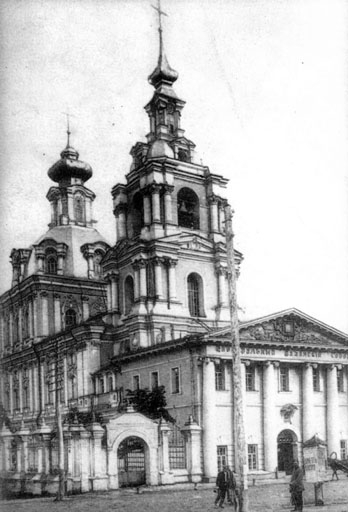
Sergievsko-Kazansky Cathedral in Kursk, 1752–1778

The cathedral has two stories, with the lower church consecrated to St. Sergius of Radonezh and the upper one to the Theotokos of Kazan. The upper church is noted for an intricate icon screen which took sixteen years to complete. The three-story cathedral bell tower derives peculiar interest from the fact that Seraphim of Sarov, whose father took part in construction works, survived an accidental fall from its top floor at the age of seven. The Resurrection Church is also shown, where St. Seraphim was baptized.

The monastery cathedral of the Sign (1816–26) is another imposing edifice, rigorously formulated in the purest Neoclassical style, with a cupola measuring 20 meters (66 ft) in diameter and rising 48 meters (157 ft) high. The interior was formerly as rich as colored marbles, gilding, and frescoes could make it. During the Soviet period, the cathedral was desecrated, and four lateral domes and twin belltowers over the entrance were pulled down. There are plans to restore the church to its former glory.

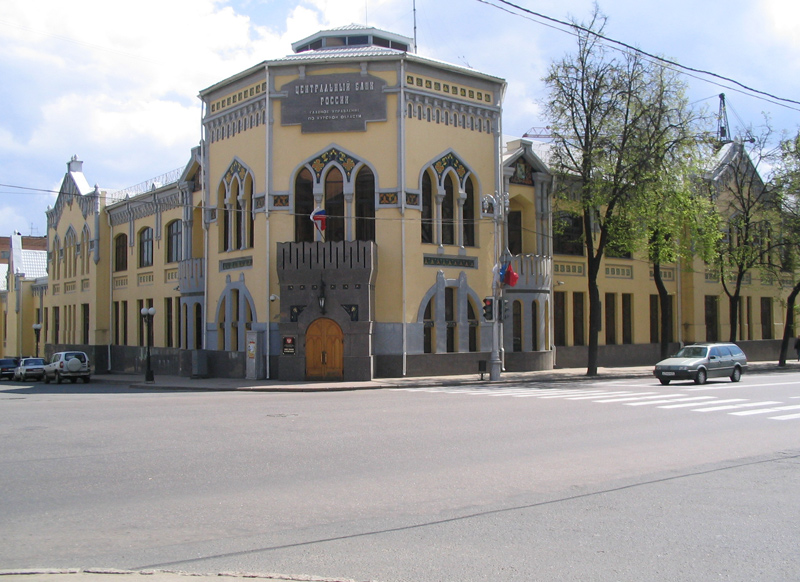
Central Bank of Russia building

The modern city is a home for several universities: Kursk State Medical University, State Technical University, Kursk State University (former Pedagogical University) and Agricultural Academy, as well as the private Regional Open Social Institute (ROSI). There are also modern shrines and memorials commemorating the Battle of Kursk, both in the city and in Prokhorovka.

The Command Station Bunker & Museum was specifically built in memory of the courageous Russian T-34 tank units that fought in the Battle of Kursk, where a T-34 tank is on display. Over 6,000 armored vehicles fought in close range over the open territory near Kursk in 1943. This battle stopped the German advance into the Kursk Salient, and was a turning point of World War II on the Eastern Front.

Kursk played a role in the Cold War as host to Khalino air base.

Nearby is Tsentralno-Chernozemny Zapovednik, a large section of steppe soil that has never been plowed. It is used for a variety of research purposes.

== Education ==
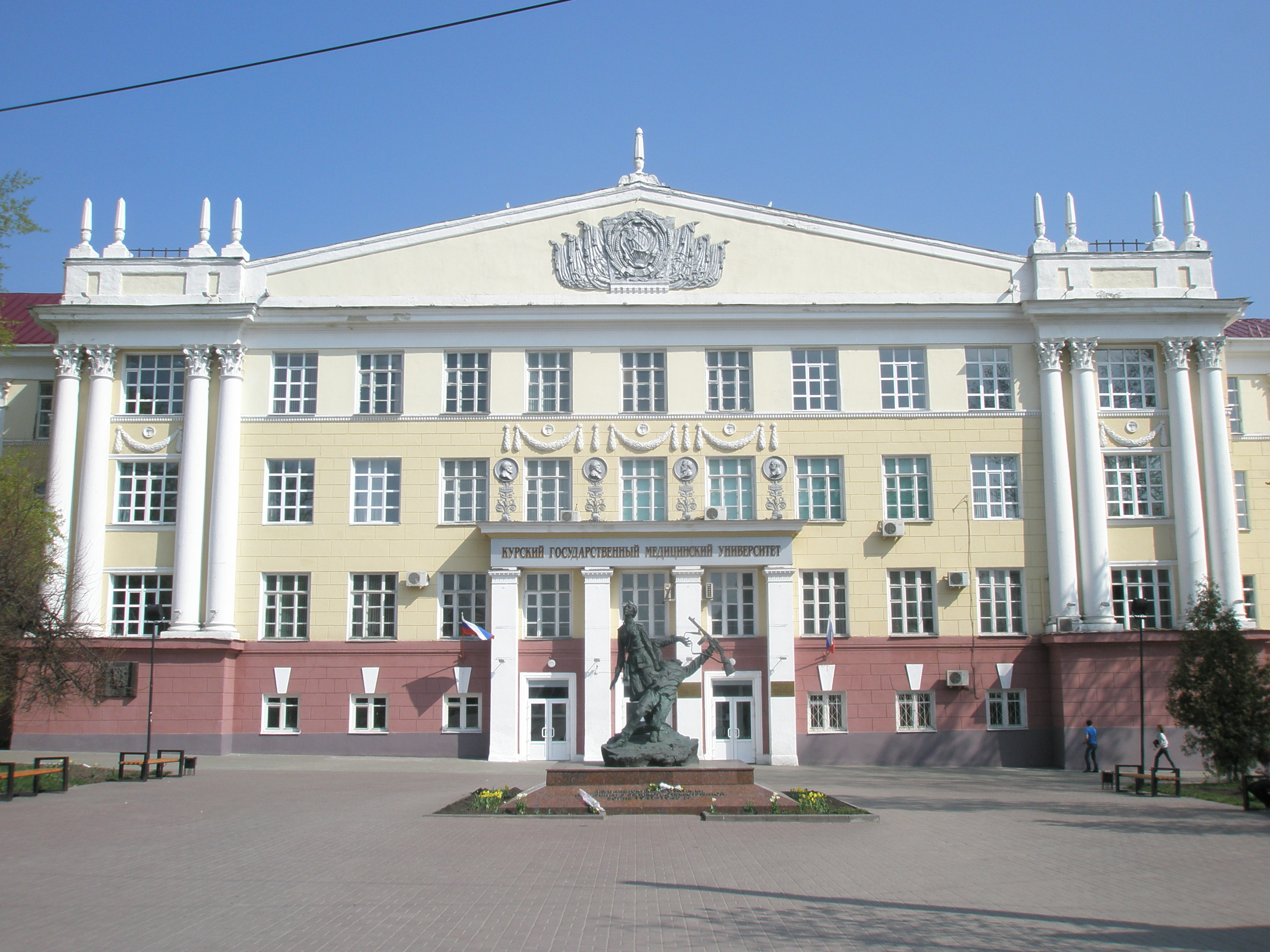
Kursk State Medical University

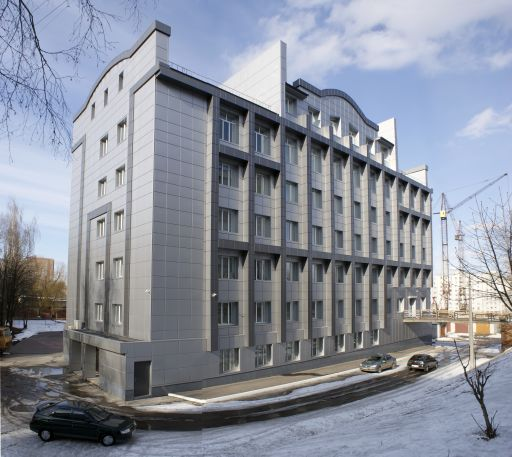
Regional Financial and Economic Institute

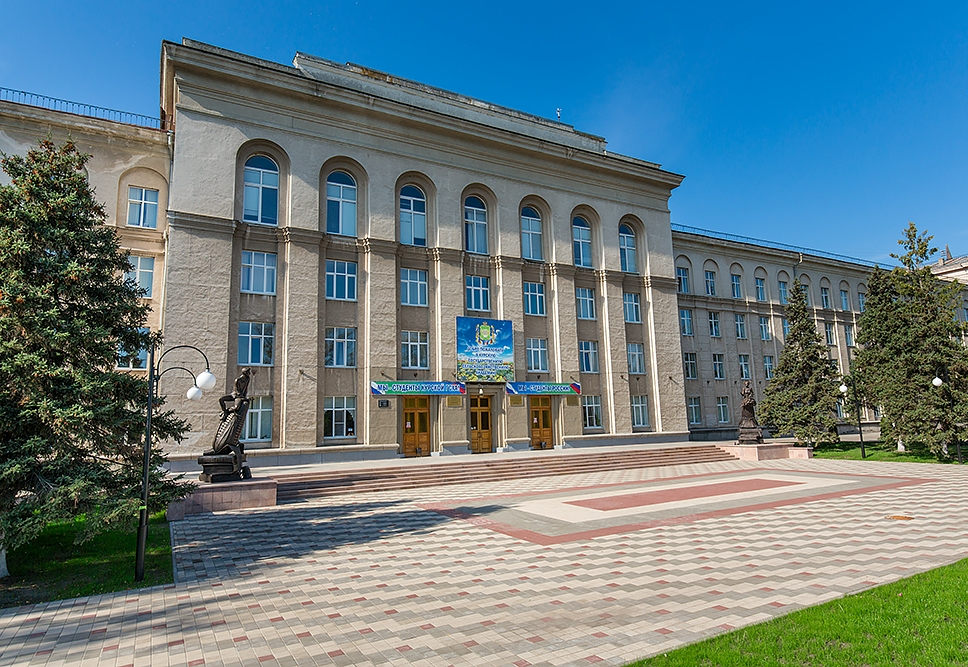
Kursk State Agricultural Academy

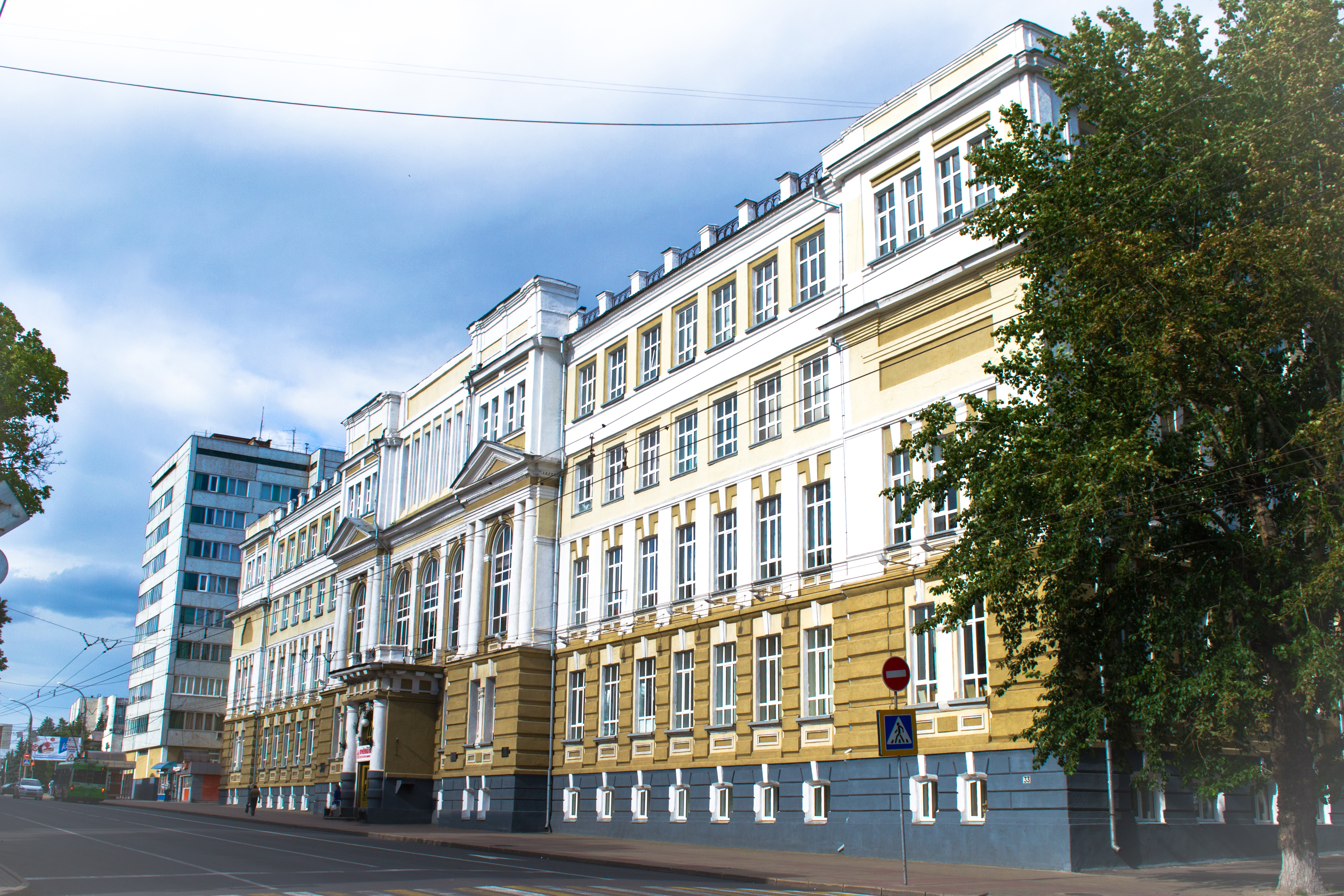
Kursk State University

== Transportation ==
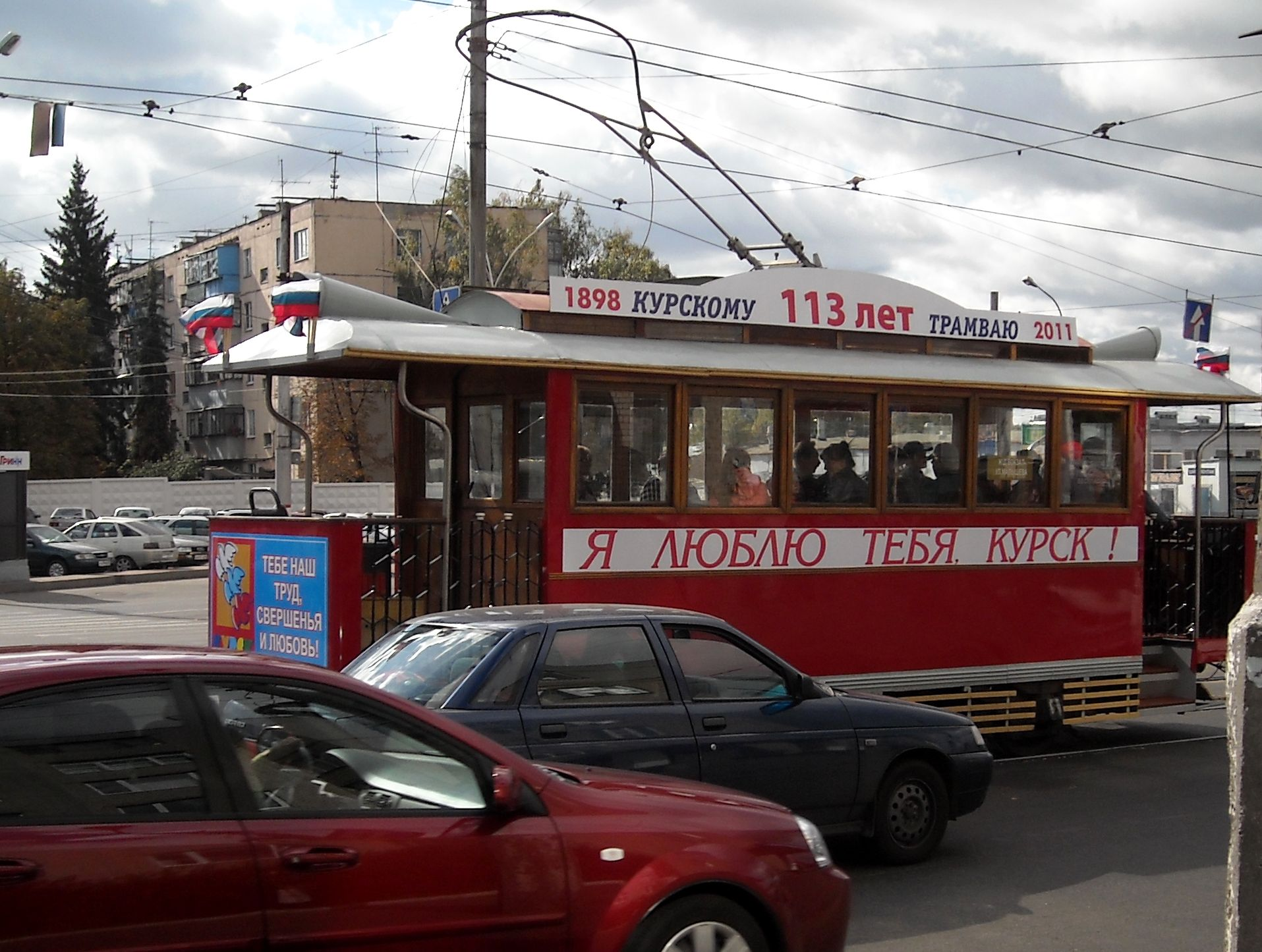
Retro-tram—a replica of a Belgian tram of 1898 on Kursk streets

Since 1868 there has been a railway connection between Kursk and Moscow. Kursk is located on a major railway line between Moscow and Kharkiv, with trains also linking the city to Voronezh and Kyiv. The Kursk Vostochny Airport provides domestic flights. Public transport includes buses, trolleybuses, and trams. Since 2007, the public transport introduced a satellite navigation system. The total length of the road network of the city of Kursk is 595.8 km, of which 496.2 km of roads are paved. Roads of the city have access to federal highway M2 "Crimea", as well as on the highway A144 (Kursk – Voronezh – Saratov) and P199 (border with Ukraine).

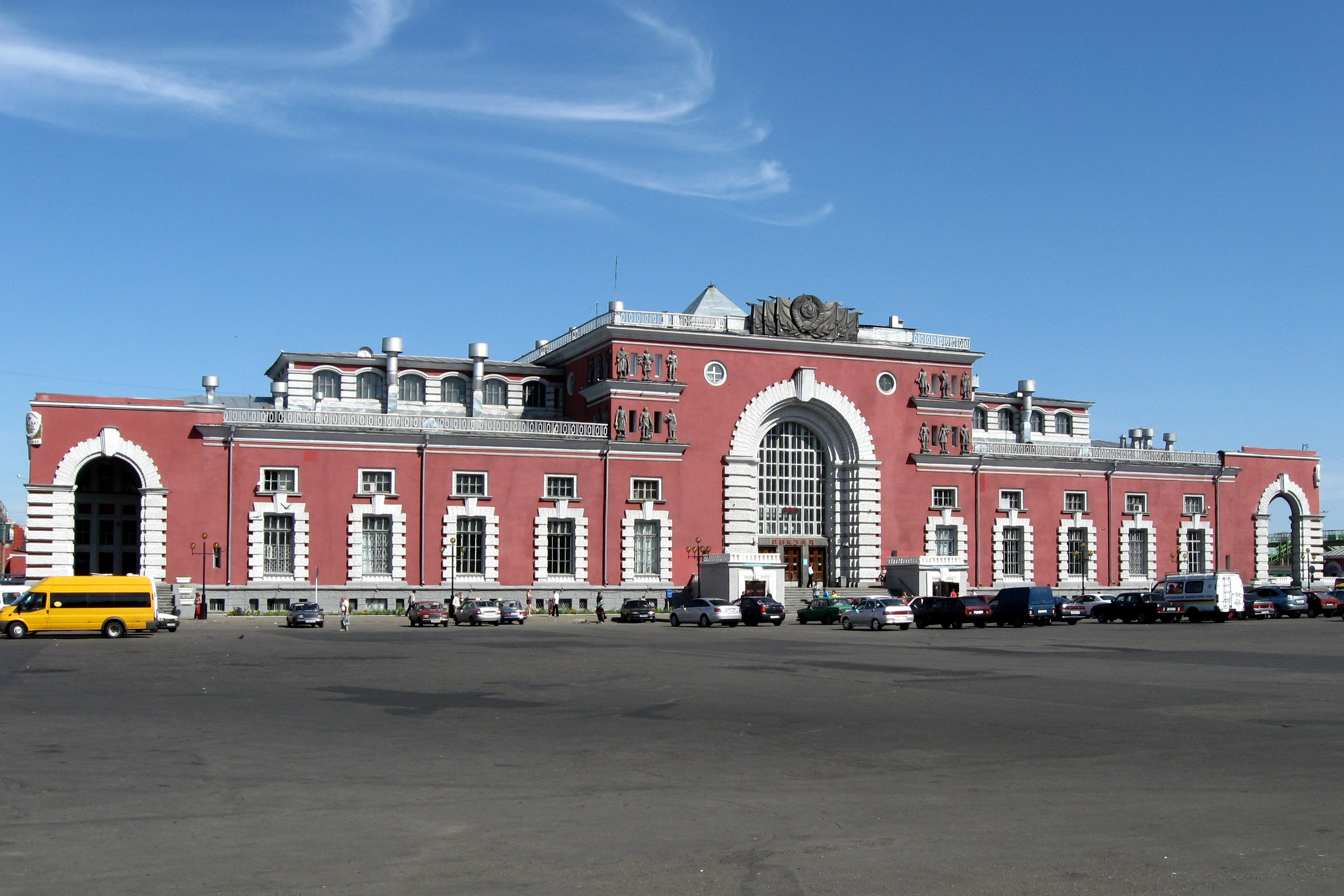
Kursk Train Station. View from Privokzal'naya Ploshchad', July 2009

Kursk bound intercity bus routes to cities and towns Kursk region and neighboring regions (Belgorod Oblast, Bryansk Oblast, Voronezh Oblast, Oryol Oblast), as well as Moscow, St. Petersburg and cities of Ukraine: Kharkiv and Sumy. Long-distance buses arrive and depart from the bus station "Kursk", located in the North-West part of the city.

On 5 September 2011 an automated fare monitoring system was commissioned in Kursk. Implementation of the system in operation is carried out by Kursk Integrated Ticket System was to take place in three stages: At the initial stage is implemented partially open version of the system, in which the sale of tickets and travel control social cards carried in the cabin of public transport conductors with handheld validators, the second stage involves the installation of stationary validators, third – commissioning turnstiles. After completion of the implementation, the automated monitoring system drive will operate in "closed" mode: turnstiles will be installed at the entrance and exit of passengers. As of September 2011 turnstiles installed on 44 buses, 10 trolley buses and trams 5.

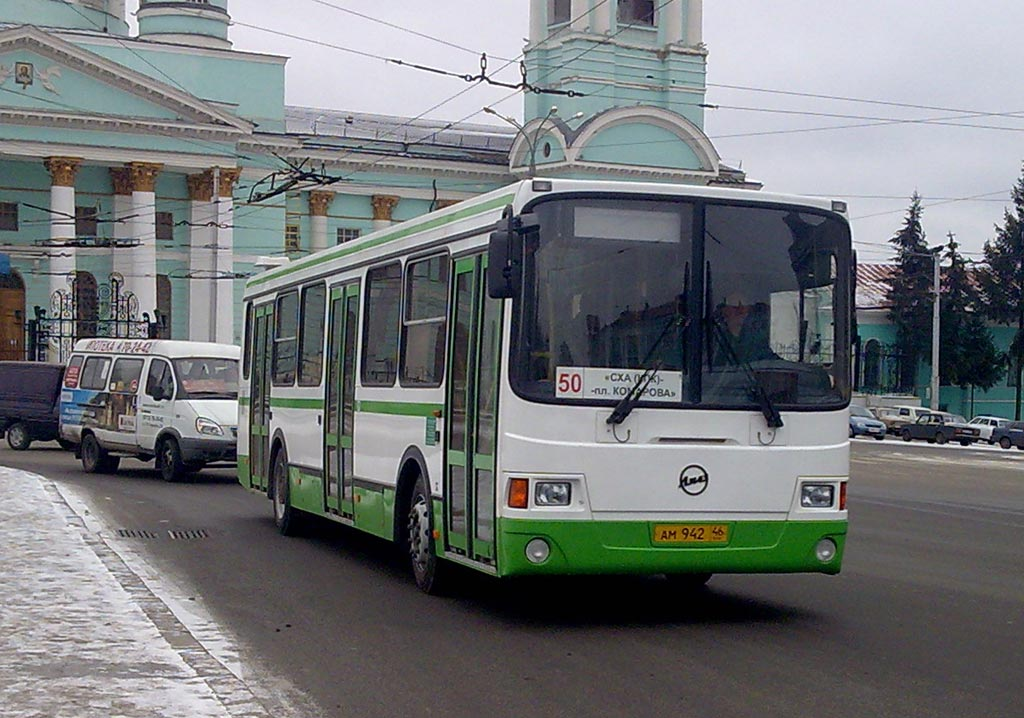
LiAZ-5256 bus

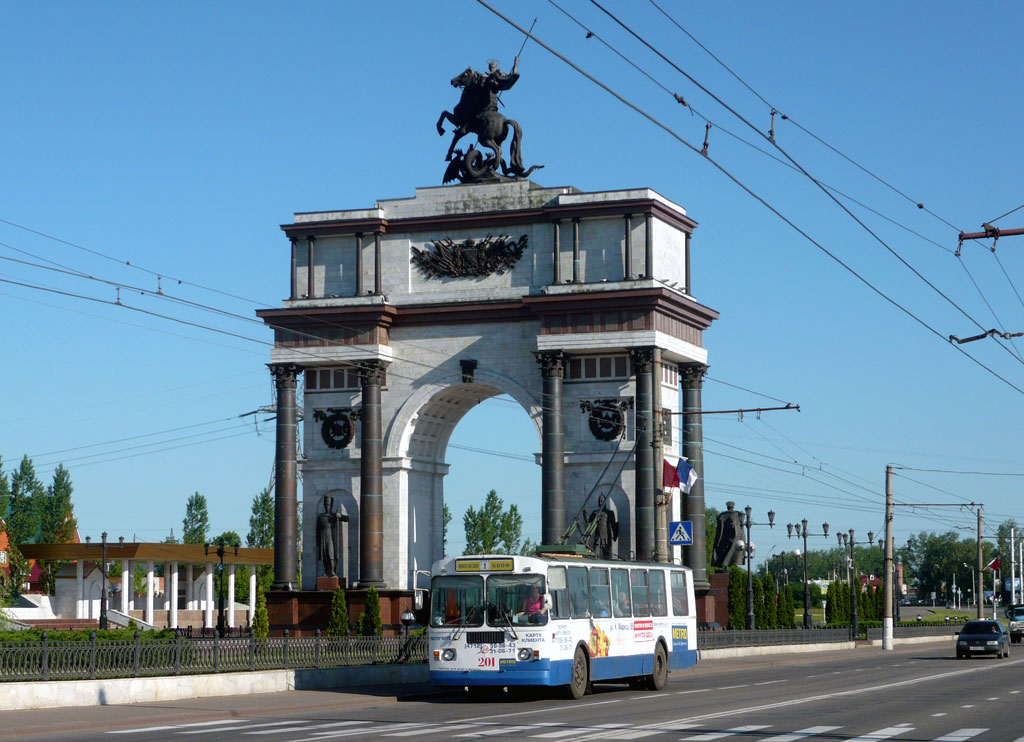
ZiU-682G trolleybus

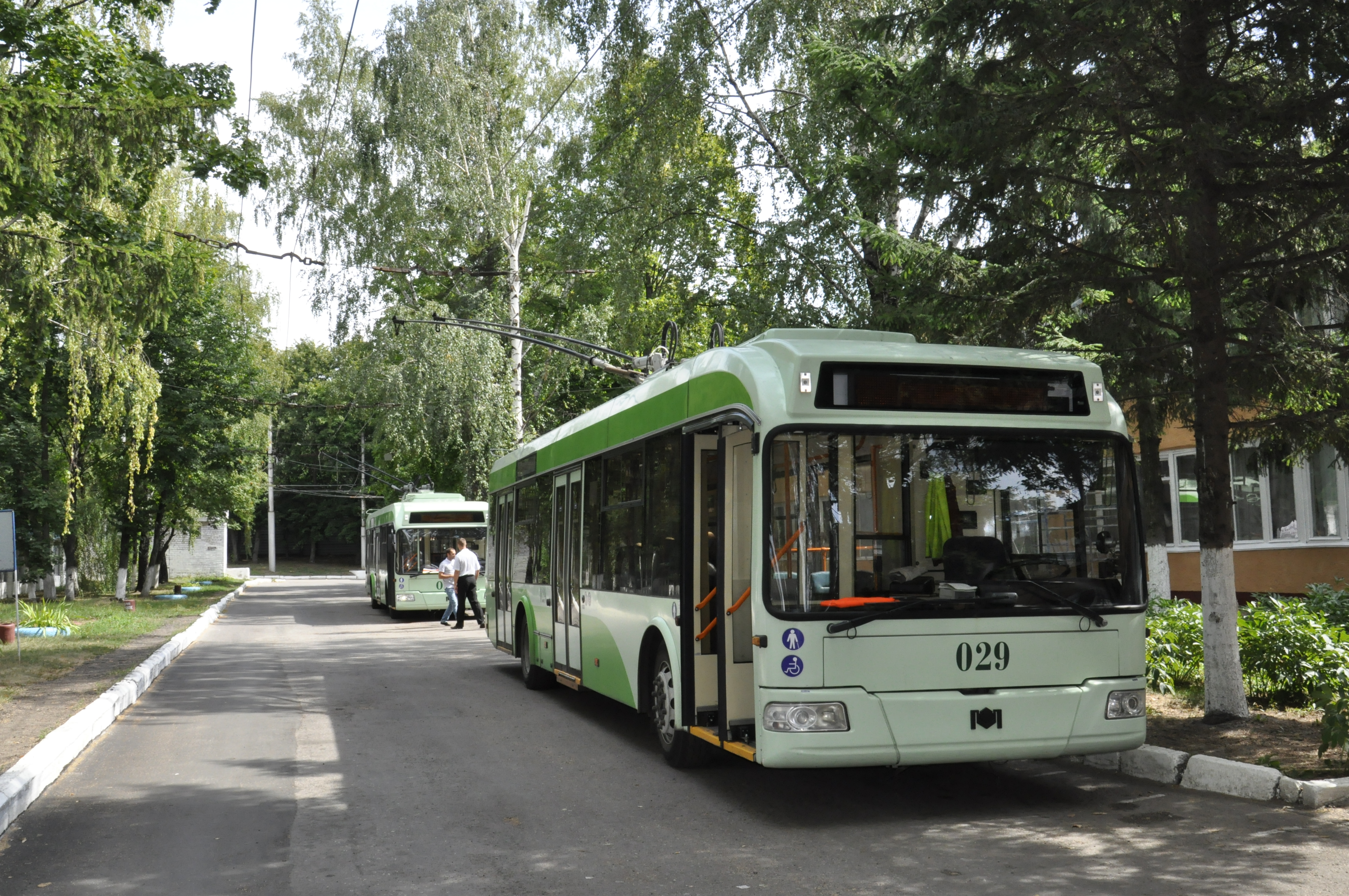
BKM-321 low-floor trolleybus

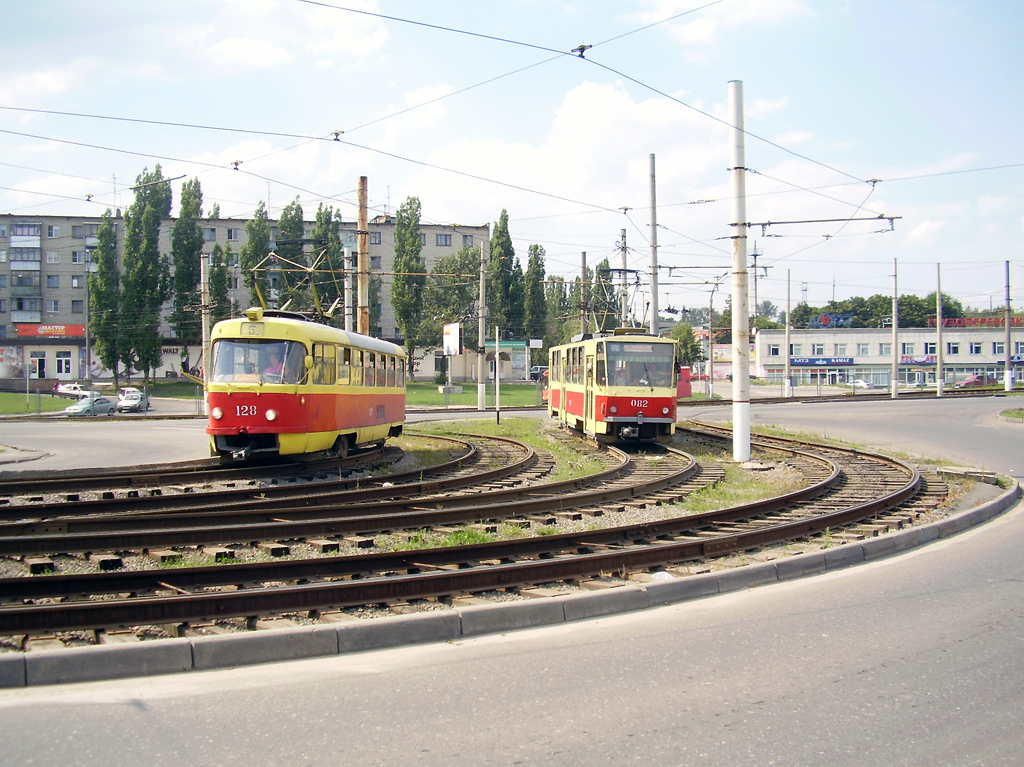
Tatra T3SU and Tatra T6B5SU trams

== Culture ==
Kursk State University is home to the Russian Chamber Orchestra, under the direction of conductor and trumpet soloist Sergey Proskurin. The orchestra performs regularly, tours internationally and has produced multiple CDs.

Pushkin Theater located in the center of the city. It has permanent company as well as visiting shows.

The band Little Tragedies are originally from Kursk.

== Sports ==
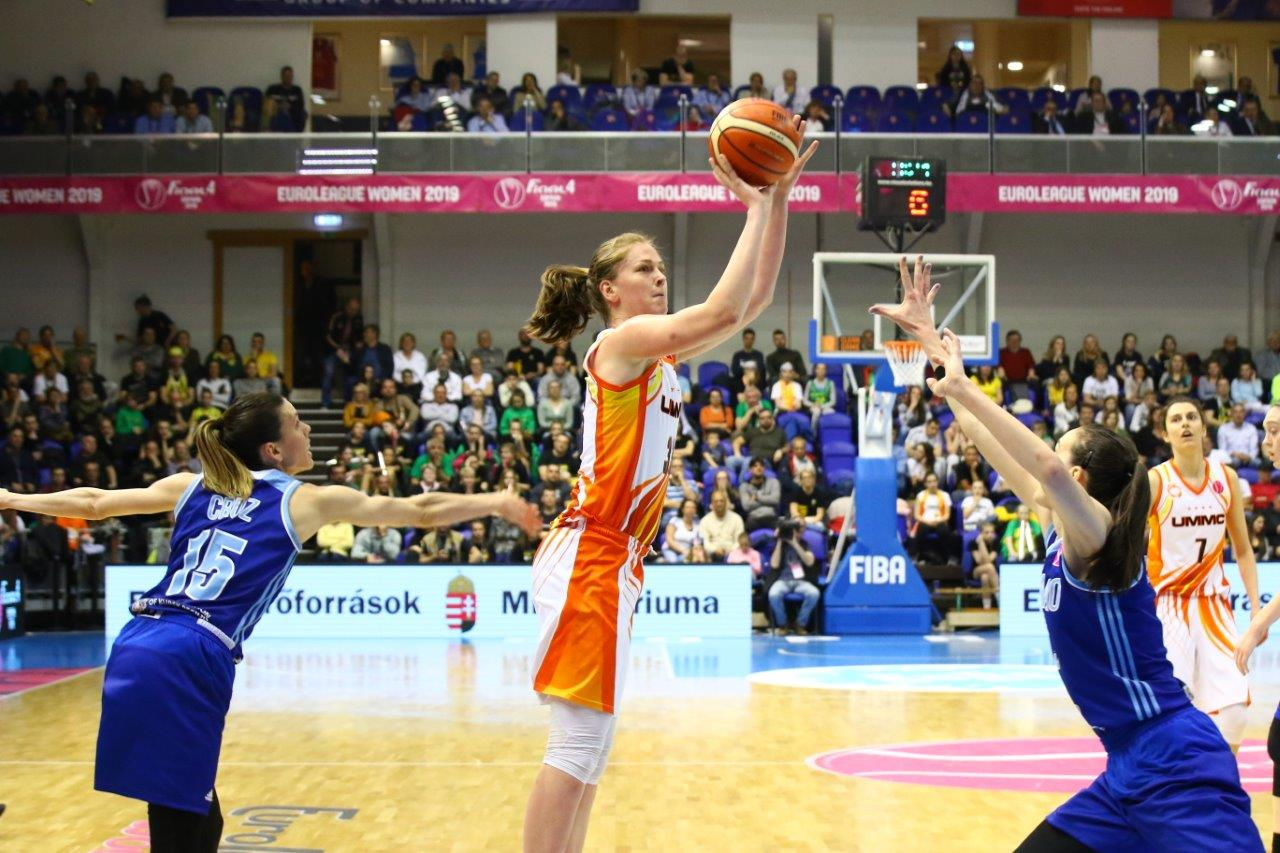
Final between Dynamo Kursk and UMMC Ekaterinburg from the EuroLeague Women Final Four 2019

In 2016, the Russian Women's Hockey League expanded to Kursk, with new club Dynamo Kursk.

== Media ==
Kursk ham radios could receive television broadcasts from Moscow starting in 1935. In 1960, the Committee on Radio and Television was created by the Kursk Oblast Executive Committee. The first transmission of local television aired on 14 January 1961. Main fixed line and cellular operators are active in the city.

== Honors ==
- A minor planet, 3073 Kursk, discovered by Soviet astronomer Nikolai Chernykh in 1979, is named after the city.
- The Russian submarine Kursk was named after the city.

== Notable people ==
- Yekaterina Avdeyeva (1788–1865), writer
- Alexey Ivanovich Borozdin (born 1937), musical therapist
- Valery Chaplygin (born 1952), Olympic champion, cyclist
- Alexander Deyneka (1899–1969), painter, sculptor
- Nikolay Karamyshev (born 1989), racing driver
- Yevgeny Klevtsov (1929–2003), Olympic medalist, cyclist
- Vyacheslav Klykov (1939–2006), sculptor
- Kazimir Malevich (1879–1935), painter
- Pavel A. Pevzner, scientist
- Alexander Povetkin (born 1979), Olympic champion, boxer
- Sergei Puskepalis (1966–2022), actor
- Alexander Rutskoy (born 1947), politician
- Seraphim of Sarov, monk and saint
- Mikhail Shchepkin (1788–1863), actor
- Georgy Sviridov (1915–1998), composer
- The Tolmachevy Twins (born 1997), singers
- Little Tragedies, music band

== Twin towns – sister cities ==
Kursk is twinned with:

- Bar, Montenegro
- Dębno, Poland
- Donetsk, Ukraine
- Feodosia, Ukraine
- Gomel, Belarus
- Izmail, Ukraine
- Niš, Serbia
- Novopolotsk, Belarus
- Polotsk, Belarus
- Primorsko, Bulgaria
- Speyer, Germany
- (Georgia (country)) Sukhumi, Georgia
- Sumy, Ukraine
- Tiraspol, Moldova
- Užice, Serbia
- Witten, Germany
- Zviahel, Ukraine

Former twin towns:

- Tczew, Poland
- Motihari, India

On 8 March 2022, the Polish city of Tczew ended its partnership with Kursk as a response to the 2022 Russian invasion of Ukraine.

== See also ==
- August 2024 Kursk Oblast incursion
- Cathedral of Our Lady of the "Omen"
- Bibliography of Russian history
