= Our Lady of the Sign =

Style of icon

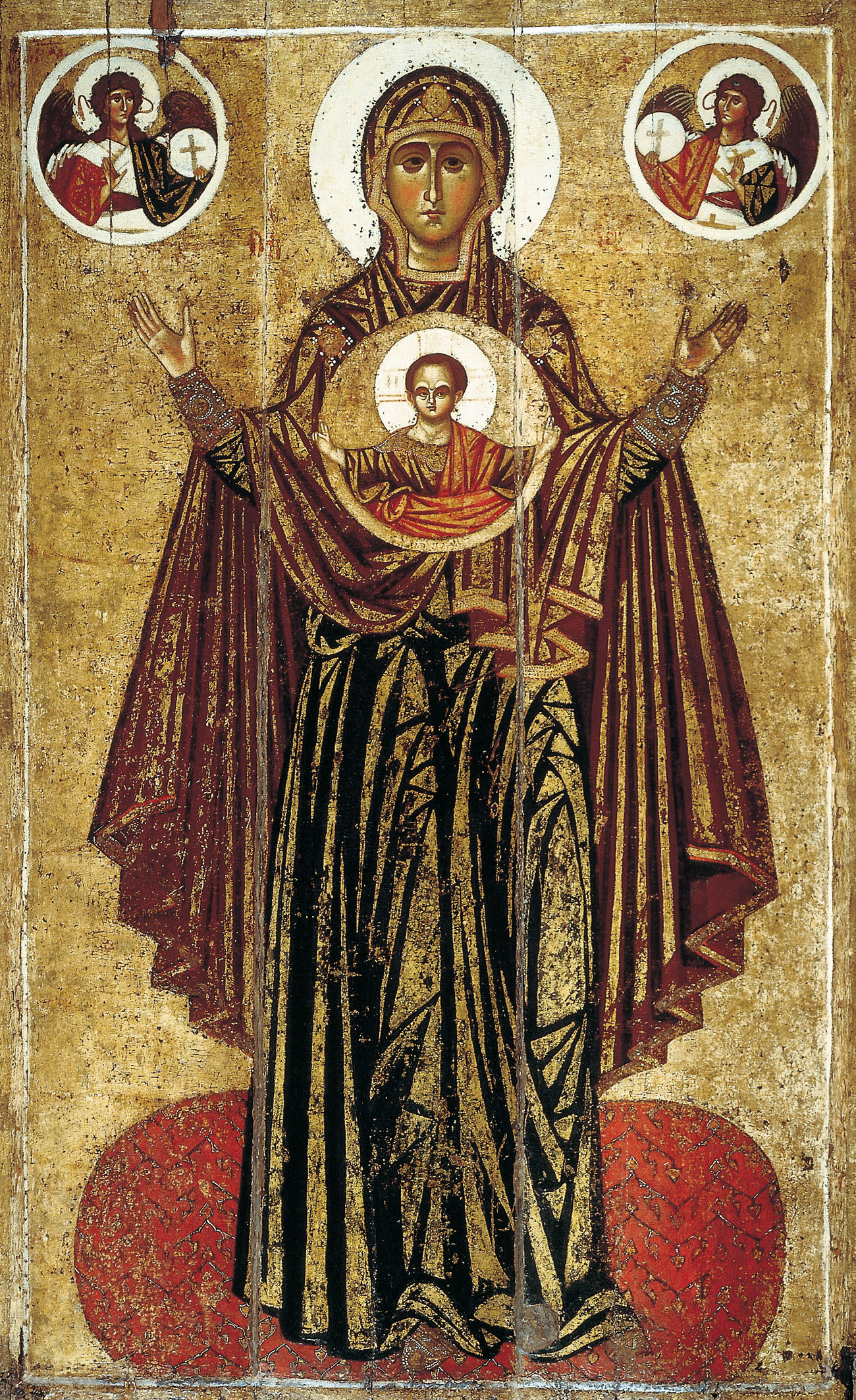
12th-century Icon of Our Lady of the Sign from Yaroslavl (Kiev School, c. 1114, Tretiakov Gallery, Moscow)

The icon of Our Lady of the Sign (Greek: Παναγία Ορωμένη; Church Slavonic: Икона Божией Матери, "Знамение", romanized: Ikona Bozhey Materi, "Znamenie"; Polish: Ikona Bogurodzicy "Znamienie") or Platytera (Greek: Παναγία Πλατυτέρα, romanized: Panagia Platytera) is the term for a particular type of icon of the Theotokos (Virgin Mary), facing the viewer directly, depicted either full length or half, with her hands raised in the orans position, and with the image of the Child Jesus depicted within a round aureole upon her breast.

== Iconography ==
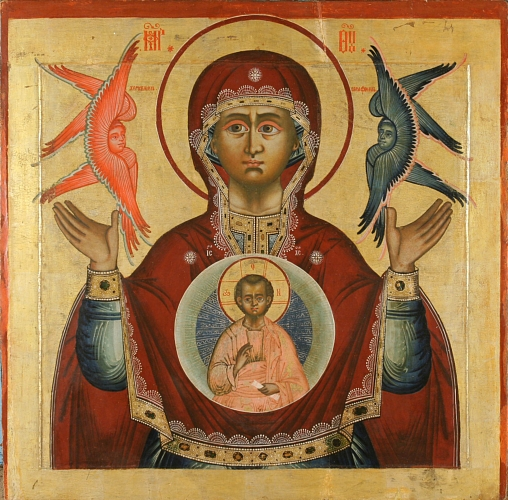
Our Lady of the Sign (18th century, iconostasis of the Transfiguration church, Kizhi monastery, Karelia, Russia)

The icon depicts the Theotokos during the Annunciation at the moment of saying, "May it be done to me according to your word."(Luke 1:38). The image of the Christ child represents him at the moment of his conception in the womb of the Virgin. He is depicted not as a fetus, but rather vested in divine robes, and often holding a scroll, symbolic of his role as teacher. Sometimes his robes are gold or white, symbolizing divine glory; sometimes they are blue and red, symbolizing the two natures of Christ (see Christology). His face is depicted as that of an old man, indicating the Christian teaching that he was at one and the same time both a fully human infant and fully the eternal God, one of the Trinity. His right hand is raised in blessing.

The term Virgin of the Sign or Our Lady of the Sign is a reference to the prophecy of Isaiah 7:14: "Therefore the Lord himself shall give you a sign; Behold, a virgin shall conceive, and bear a son, and shall call his name Immanuel". Such an image is often placed in the apse of the sanctuary of an Orthodox church above the Holy Table (altar).

As with most Orthodox icons of Mary, the letters ΜΡ ΘΥ (short for ΜΗΤΗΡ ΘΕΟΥ, "Mother of God") are usually placed on the upper left and right of the head of the Virgin Mary.

This type of icon is also sometimes called the Platytera (Πλατυτέρα, lit. 'wider, more spacious'); poetically, by containing the Creator of the Universe in her womb, Mary has become Πλατυτέρα των Ουρανών (Platytera ton Ouranon,'More spacious than the Heavens'). The Platytera is traditionally depicted on the half-dome that stands above the altar. It is visible high above the iconostasis, and facing down the length of the nave of the church. This particular depiction is usually on a dark blue background, often adorned by golden stars.

== History ==
The depiction of the Virgin Mary with her hands upraised in prayer ("orans") is of very ancient origin in Christian art. In the mausoleum of St Agnes in Rome is a depiction dating to the 4th century which depicts the Theotokos with hands raised in prayer and the infant Jesus sitting upon her knees. There is also an ancient Byzantine icon of the Mother of God "Nikopea" from the 6th century, where the Virgin Mary is depicted seated upon a throne and holding in her hands an oval shield with the image of "Emmanuel".

Icons of the Virgin, known as "The Sign", appeared in Russia during the 11th to 12th centuries. The Novgorod Znamenie icon became highly venerated in the Novgorod Republic because of what Orthodox Christians believe to be the miraculous deliverance of Novgorod from invasion in 1170.

== Veneration ==
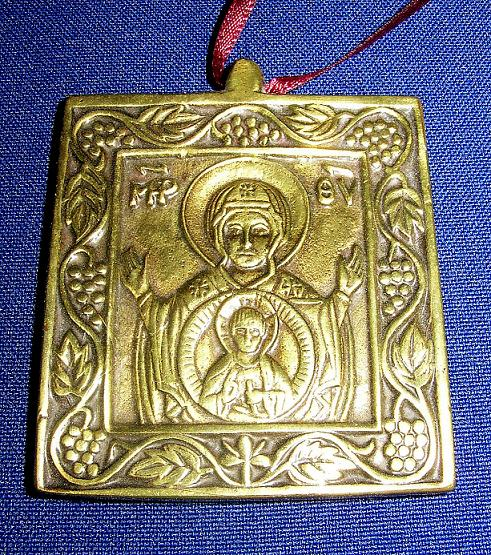
18th-century Byzantine-style bronze of Our Lady of the Sign from Jerusalem, showing the Mary, the mother of Jesus in the "Orans" position

There are a number of different feast days during the liturgical year which commemorate Our Lady of the Sign. The main feast is on November 27. Other feast days normally commemorate specific copies of the icon to which wonderworking power has been ascribed by the Orthodox Church. Many of these have special titles which help to distinguish them. Some of the icons have more than one feast day. The accounts of a number of these may be found in the External links, below.

- March 8—"Kursk-Root"
- July 20—"Chukhloma" and "Abalaka"
- September 24—"Mirozh" Icon
- November 9—"Quick to Hear" (Greek: Γοργοεπήκοος, Gorgoepēkoos, She who responds promptly to supplications)
- November 27—Weeping Icon at Novgorod, "Tsarskoe Selo", "Kursk-Root", "Seraphim-Ponetaevka" and "Abalaka"

Among the more famous variants of this genre are the Icons of the Mother of God of Abalatsk, Kursk-Root, Mirozh, Novgorod, Sankt Petersburg, Tsarskoye Selo and Vologda.

The Church of St. Stanislaus Kostka, one of Chicago's famed Polish Cathedrals, is home to a 9-foot-wide (2.7 m) Iconic Monstrance of Our Lady of the Sign as part of the planned Sanctuary of The Divine Mercy that is being constructed adjacent to the church. The Monstrance will be found within the sanctuary's adoration chapel which will be the focus of 24-hour Eucharistic Adoration and where there will be no liturgies or vocal prayers, either by individuals or groups as the space will be strictly meant for private meditation and contemplation.

== See also ==
- Blachernitissa
- Panagia
- Worship
- Our Lady of the Sign (Novgorod)
