= Theotokos of Kursk =

Religious icon

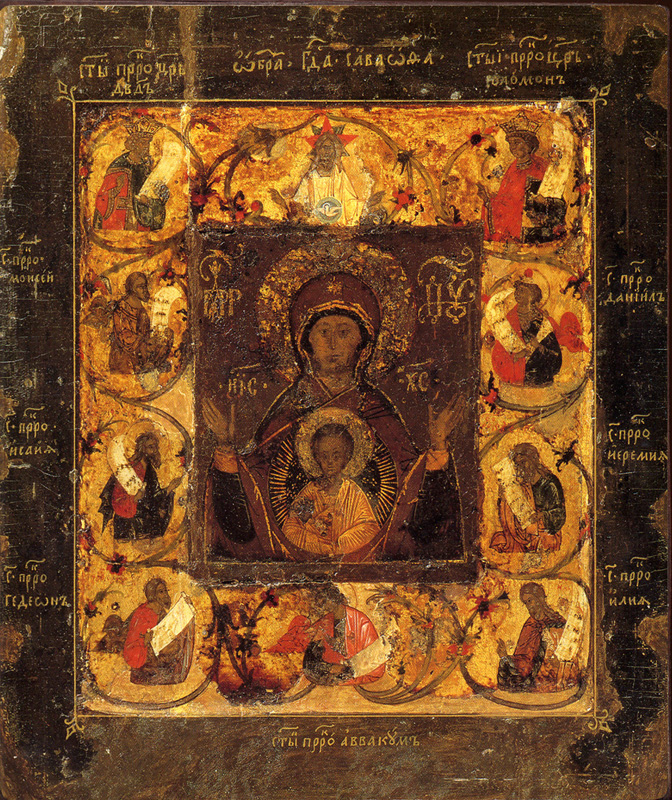
Kurskaya Korennaya icon

The Kursk Root Icon of the Sign (also Our Lady of Kursk, Blessed Mother of Kursk) (Russian: Богоматерь Курская Коренная, Пресвятая Матерь Курская, Bogomater Kurskaya Korennaya, literally Theotokos of Kursk, Found Among the Roots) is an icon of Theotokos of the Sign, apparently painted in the thirteenth century and discovered in a forest near Kursk c. 1295.

== History ==
The icon was preserved in the Black Hermitage of the Roots (Chornaya Korennaya Pustyn), an abbey founded on the spot of its discovery. It was regularly brought from the abbey to Kursk in a great procession involving thousands of peasants and pilgrims. This ceremony is depicted in the famous painting by Ilya Repin; see Religious Procession in Kursk Province.

The icon actually incorporates as many as twelve figures on it: Theotokos, Infant Christ, the Lord Sabaoth above them (with the Holy Spirit as a dove) and nine Old Testament prophets. The image of Theotokos belongs to the Panagia type. It was regarded as a palladion of the Russian Imperial Army.

In the autumn of 1920, the icon was taken by the Gen Pyotr Wrangel′s White Army outside Russia; it was kept in Serbia until September 1944 (mostly in the Russian church in Belgrade), then in Vienna and Munich, finally, since January 1951 — in the United States (since 1959, in the cathedral named after the icon, in the new headquarters of the Russian Orthodox Church Outside Russia in 93rd Street New York City).

Since 2009, the icon is regularly brought to Kursk Oblast, Russia, and other places in Russia and around the world for veneration by the faithful.
