= Religious Procession in Kursk Governorate =

Painting by Ilya Repin

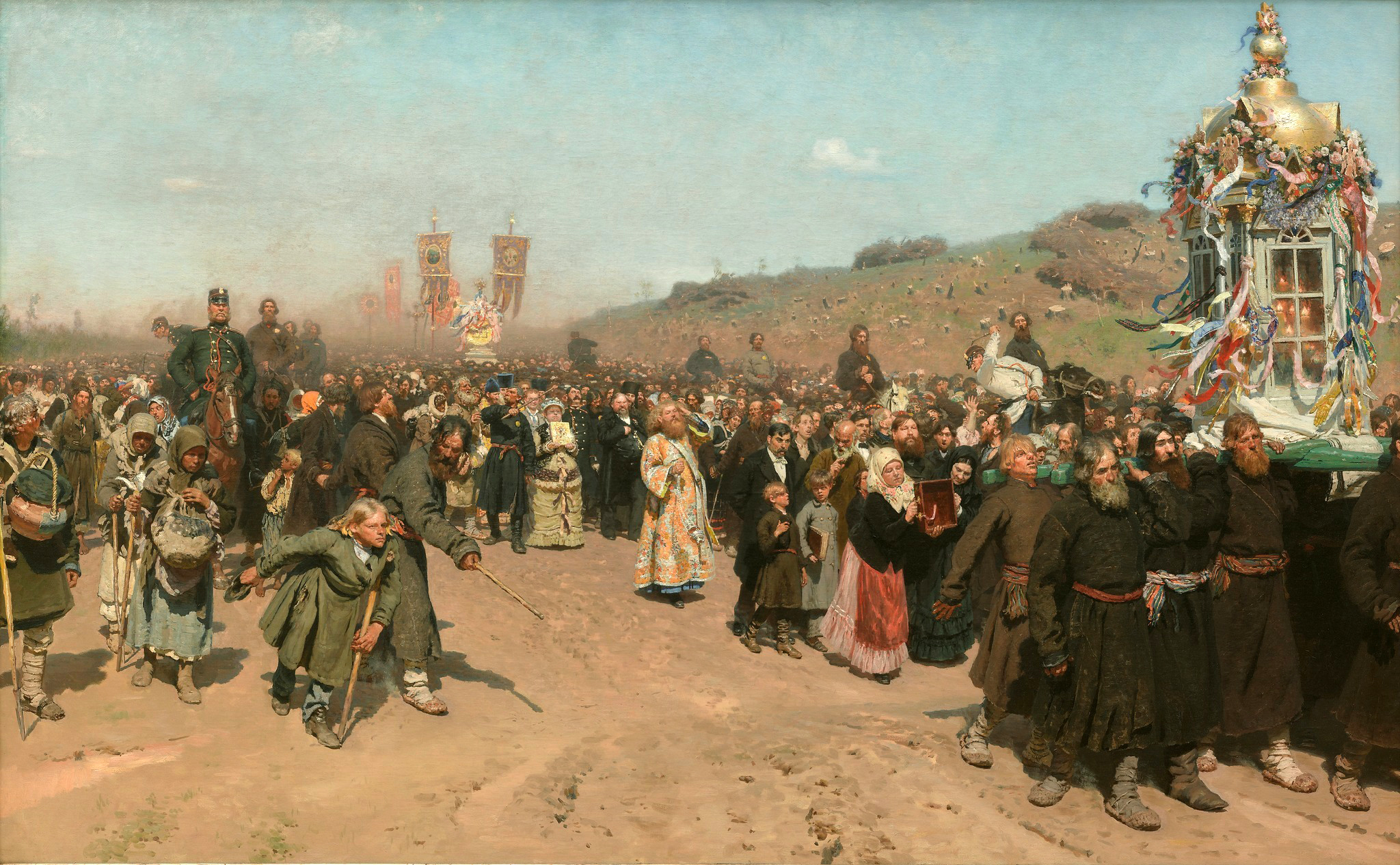
- Artist: Ilya Repin
- Year: 1880
- Medium: Oil on canvas
- Dimensions: 175 cm × 280 cm (69 in × 110 in)
- Location: Tretyakov Gallery; Moscow

Religious Procession in Kursk Governorate (also known as Easter Procession in the District of Kursk or A Religious Procession in Kursk Gubernia') (Russian: Крестный ход в Курской губернии) is a large oil on canvas painting by Russian realist artist Ilya Repin (1844–1930). Completed between 1880 and 1883, the work shows a seething, huddled mass attending the annual crucession (cross-carrying Eastern Orthodox religious procession) which carried the famous icon Our Lady of Kursk from its home at the Korennaya Pustyn Monastery to the nearby city of Kursk, western Russia.

The procession is led through a dusty landscape by robed, Orthodox priests holding icons, festoons and banners over their heads. Behind them follow a crowd mostly of peasants, but ranging from beggars and disabled people, police and military officers to figures from the provincial elite. Religious Procession led to controversy when first exhibited due to the icon being held by a man who appears to be drunk.

The painting is a continuation of Repin's social commentary in his works and highlights perceived abuses by both church and state. He wrote of the work, "I am applying all of my insignificant forces to try to give true incarnation to my ideas; life around me disturbs me a great deal and gives me no peace – it begs to be captured on canvas..."

== Description ==
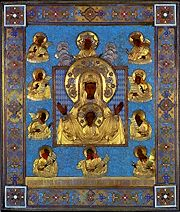
The Our Lady of Kursk icon, 13th century

At the right, burly peasants carry a platform holding the icon inside an elaborate neo-classical case; only gleams of light reflecting off the gold riza icon-cover can be made out. Lines of peasants joining hands hold back the crowd, the foremost at the left trying to stop the crippled boy breaking through the cordon with his stick. Alongside ride peasant or priest stewards and officials and police in uniform, some of the latter beating back the crowd with their riding crops. Behind the icon follow priests and better-dressed people, carrying icons in front of their chest, and an "effete, dandified and bored priest" in vestments carefully straightens his hair. There is a comic effect with a stout middle-aged woman in a yellow dress and bonnet carrying an icon behind him, who looks very like a priest in his vestments. An empty icon-case, presumably that of the icon carried by the wealthy woman behind, is carried with as much reverence as the icon itself.

The hillside at right appears to have been recently cleared of timber, with fresh tree stumps. Further back another platform, holding what appears to be a circular icon, is preceded by two large banners, and behind that a large processional cross can be made out through the cloud of dust.

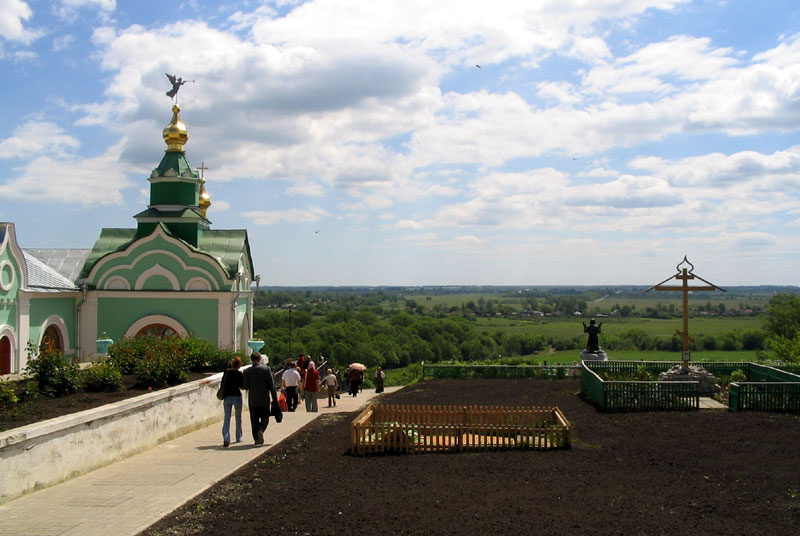
The Korennaya Monastery

The Procession is representative of Repin's style of the period, in that it initially appears to be a scene from everyday life in Russia. In fact, it pointedly shows people from a range of social strata united and moving collectively towards their destination at Korennaya.

== Provenance and critical opinion ==
The painting was highly popular, but controversial. The journal publishing a favourable review by the leading critic Vladimir Stasov published an editorial in the next issue dissociating itself from his views, and a second review by the editor. Stasov had made much of the violence of the riders to the crowd. Apart from Leo Tolstoy, who praised the painting and regarded it as neutral in its depiction of the social system, all were agreed that it was hostile to the established social order. Another reviewer noted with disapproval the "undesirables who thronged around it at exhibition, noting a preponderance of liberated women with short haircuts, nihilistic young men, and a strong Jewish element; the chief characters of Imperial xenophobia".

The writer Richard Brettell summarised the painting as "a sort of summa of Russian society, diverse members of which move uneasily but restlessly together down a dusty path through a naked landscape towards a future that cannot be seen even by the painter." Critic Christian Brinton saw a mixture of "fat, gold-robed priests, stupid peasants, wretched cripples, cruel mouthed officials, and inflated rural dignitaries". Repin is less sympathetic to the privileged members of the procession, whom he depicts as uncaring and indifferent to their struggling fellow travelers. The disenfranchised members of Russian society are represented by, amongst others, the old and young peasants in the left foreground (serfdom in Russia had been abolished in 1861).

The painting was bought by the leading Russian collector Pavel Tretyakov for a record 10,000 roubles, but Tretyakov wanted Repin to replace the maids carrying the empty icon-case with "a beautiful young girl, exuding spiritual rapture". Repin refused. Tretyakov's large collection was opened as a museum in his lifetime, and is now the much augmented, state-run Tretyakov Gallery in Moscow.

== Bibliography ==
- Alpatov, Mikhail. Russian Impact on Art. New York: Philosophical Library, 1950.
- Bolton, Roy. Russia & Europe in the Nineteenth Century. Sphinx Books, 1999. ISBN 1-907200-02-9
- Jackson, David L., The wanderers and critical realism in nineteenth-century Russian painting, Manchester University Press, 2006, ISBN 0-7190-6434-1, ISBN 978-0-7190-6434-0, google books
- State Tretyakov Gallery; Guidebook, 2000, Moscow, Avant-Garde, ISBN 5-86394-106-5
- Sternin, Grigory. Ilya Efimovitch Repin: Painter of Russian History. USSR, 1995. ISBN 0-569-08846-1
