= Praskovya Savelieva =

Soviet partisan during World War II

Praskovya Ivanovna Savelieva
- Праско́вья Ива́новна Саве́льева
- Born: 5 October 1918; Zarubino village, Tver Governorate, Russian SFSR
- Died: 12 January 1944 (aged 25); Lutsk, Ukrainian SSR
- Citizenship: Soviet Union
- Awards: Order of Lenin

Praskovya "Pasha" Ivanovna Savelieva was a Soviet underground partisan during World War II who was awarded the Order of Lenin for her actions.

== Biography ==
Savelieva was born on 5 October 1918 in the village of Zarubino in the province of Tver. She graduated from school in Rzhev in 1936, then attended the Moscow Institute of Credit and Economics.

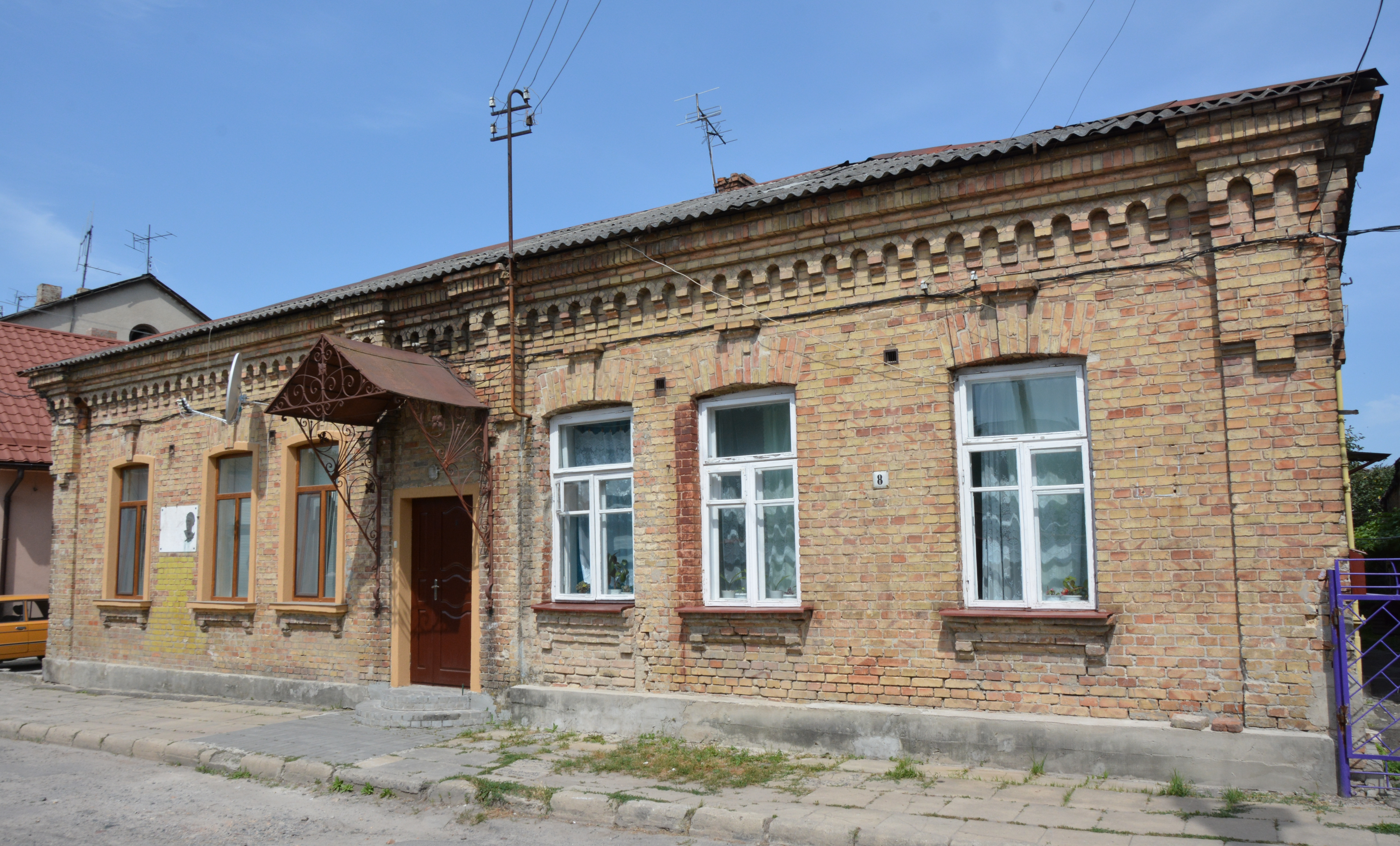
House in which Praskovya Savelieva lived while in Lutsk

During World War II, she refused to evacuate from the city of Lutsk in Ukraine where she was living. After the city was occupied, she immediately began an underground group in the fall of 1941 alongside V.V. Izmailov. Members of the group distributed leaflets, helped Soviet POWs escape from German prisons, and stole German documents and medicine. After the death of Izmailov, Savelieva became the sole leader of the underground group.

In the spring of 1943, Savelieva's group was able to establish contact with partisans under the command of Dmitry Medvedev. During this time, the mission of Savelieva's group began to change drastically. Collaborating with the partisans, the group used a detailed map of Lutsk to identify military facilities and begin engaging in sabotage. These actions included sabotage of a railway and stealing a sample of an experimental chemical weapon to send back to Moscow.

On 22 December 1943, a collaborationist turned in a tip to the Gestapo which led to Savelieva being arrested by the secret police. On 12 January 1944, after severe torture and interrogation, she was burned alive in the courtyard of a former Catholic monastery in Lutsk. Before her death, on the wall of her cell, she scrawled a note with a nail which, when translated, read:

A dark, terrible moment is approaching. The whole body is crippled - no arms, no legs ... But I die in silence. It's scary to die at 26. How I wanted to live! In the name of the people who will come after us, in the name of you, Motherland, we are leaving ... Bloom, be beautiful, dear, and goodbye. Your Pasha.

== Awards ==
- Order of Lenin (1945, posthumously)

== Memorials ==
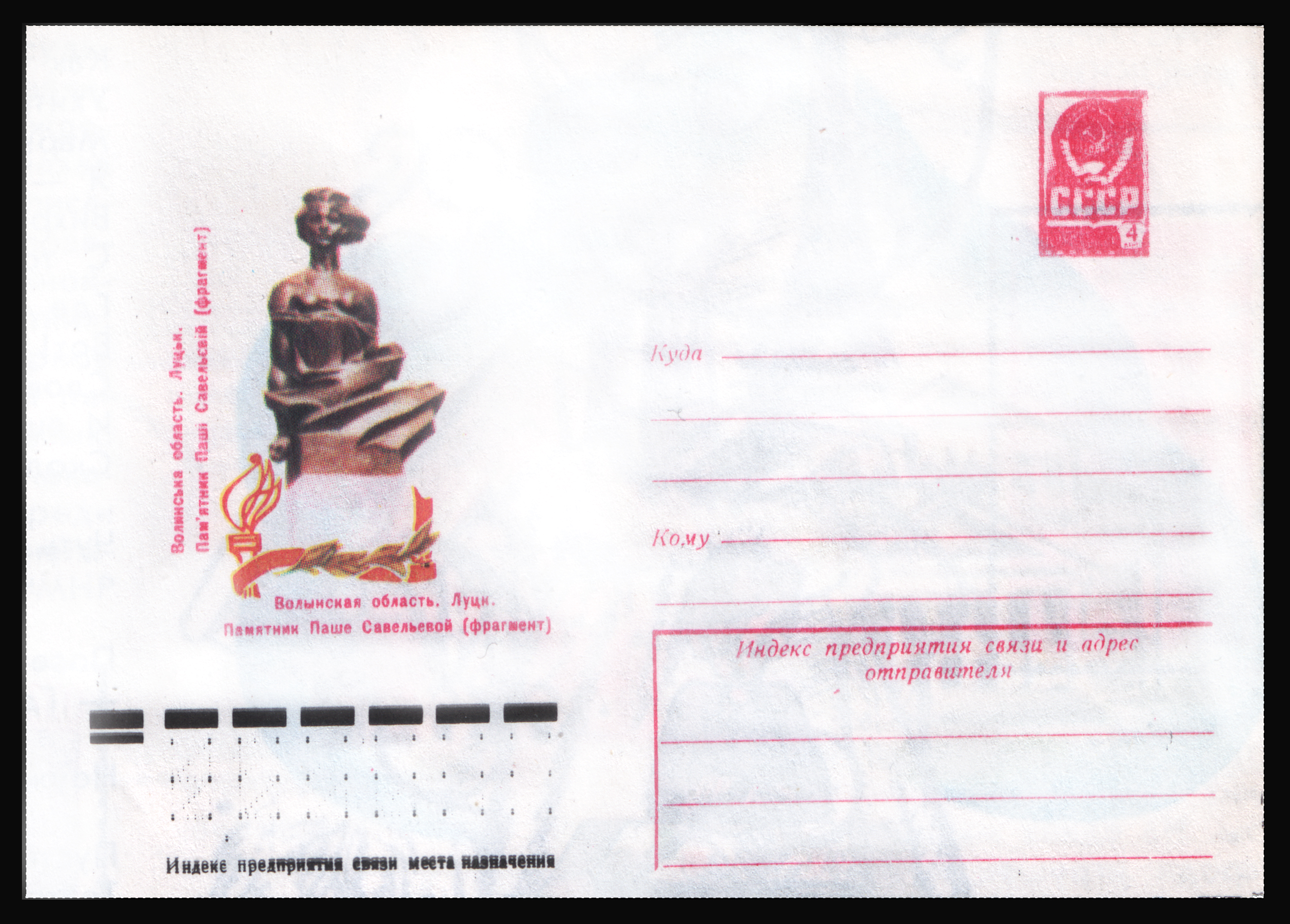
Illustrated stamped envelope depicting a monument of Praskovya Savelieva

Numerous memorials and buildings have been created or named for Praskovya Savelieva. Selected memorials and events are listed here.

=== Soviet period ===
- A museum was dedicated to Savelieva in Rzhev, which is now a children's library.
- In 1965, a street in Rzhev was named for Savelieva. Additionally, in Lutsk, Polyarnaya Street was renamed Pasha Savelyeva Street.
- In 1972, a bronze monument was erected at the site of Savelieva's death through fundraising by the citizens of Lutsk.
- Since 1975, all-Union motorsport competitions have been held in Lutsk, with athletes competing for the Pasha Savelieva Prize.
- In 1977, an illustrated stamped envelope was issued which depicts the Pasha Savelieva monument in Lutsk.

=== Post-Soviet period ===
- In May 2006, an attempt was made to steal the Pasha Savelieva monument in Lutsk. It was thrown off its pedestal and damaged. The sculpture was repaired and reinstalled, but in August of the same year it was stolen again and has not been found since.
- In 2007, Pasha Savelieva Street in Lutsk was renamed to Galshka Gulevichevna Street.

== Bibliography ==
- T. Gladkov, A. Lukin. Girl from Rzhev. - M . Young Guard, 1974
- Gavrilyuk V. The heroine of the Lutsk underground. Philately of the USSR. - 1981. - No. 4. - P. 57.
