= Cathedral of Our Lady of the "Omen" =

Orthodox cathedral in Kursk, Russia

- Cathedral of Our Lady of "The Omen"
- Кафедральный собор иконы Божией Матери "Знамение"
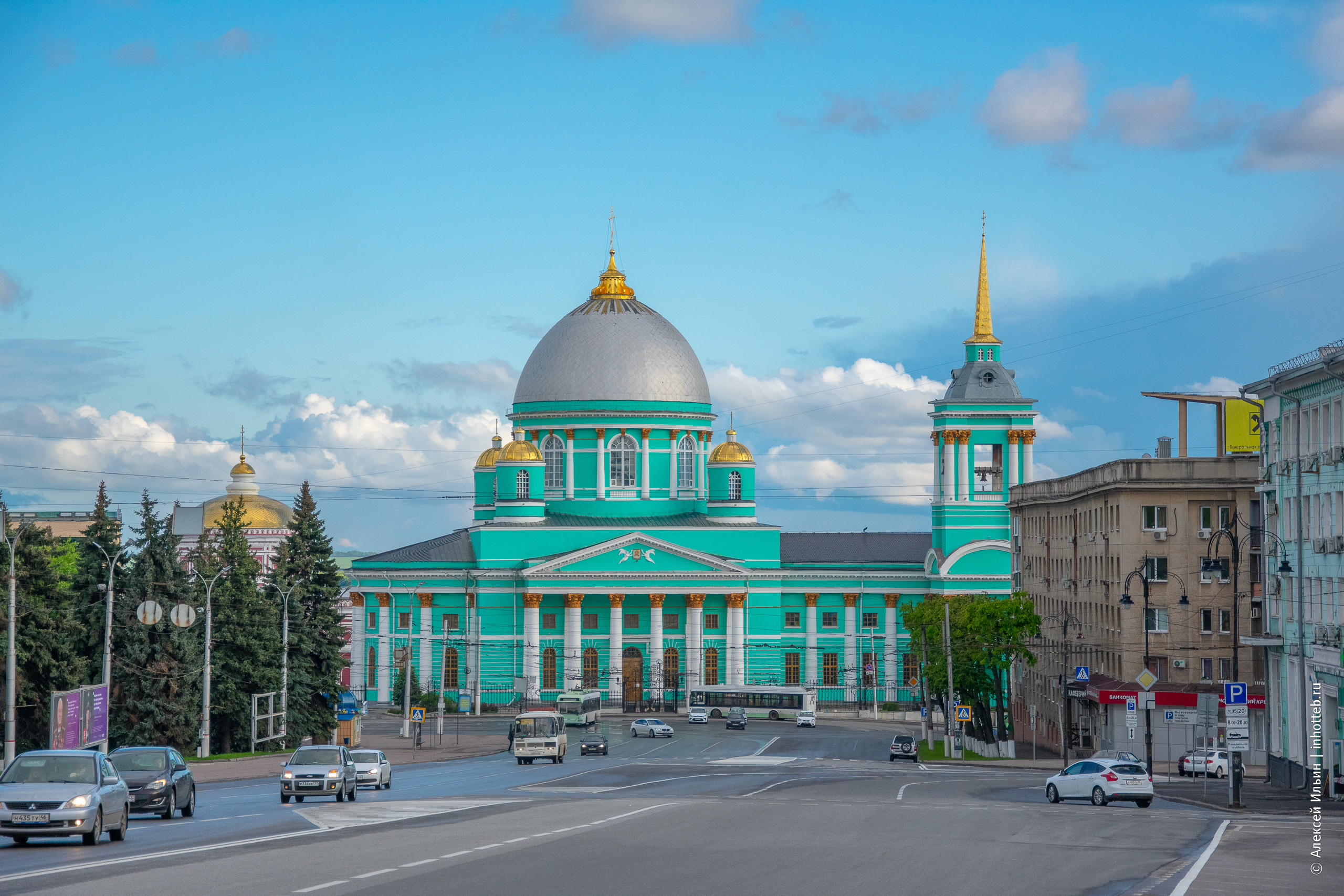
- Cathedral of Our Lady of the "Omen"
- 51.4340°N 36.1134°E
- Location: Kursk
- Country: Russia
- Denomination: Russian Orthodox
- Churchmanship: Diocese of Kursk

History
- Status: Object of cultural heritage of Russia
- Founded: 1615

Architecture
- Architect: Archimandrite Pallady (Beletsev)
- Architectural type: Church
- Style: Neoclassical architecture in Russia
- Years built: 1816–1826

Administration
- Diocese: Diocese of Kursk

Cathedral of Our Lady of the "Omen" (Russian: Кафедральный собор иконы Божией Матери "Знамение", romanized: Kafedral'nyy sobor ikony Bozhiyey Materi "Znameniye") is a Russian Orthodox church in Kursk, Russia. It is the main cathedral of the Diocese of Kursk within the Russian Orthodox Church. It is located in the historical center of the city.

It was built between 1816 and 1826 to celebrate the victory in the French invasion of Russia of 1812. The temple was built in the style of classicism, which is a type of architecture that imitates the features of the Western European Renaissance. It has a traditional cross-dome construction, which means it has a cruciform design with a significantly elongated western part. For a long time, the cathedral stored the miracle-working Theotokos of Kursk icon. Every year, there was a procession with the icon. It was transferred to the Kursk Root Monastery Hermitage of the Nativity of the Virgin Mary.

The cathedral has been rebuilt several times over its long history. In 1943, it was badly damaged in a fire. From 1937 to 1992, the cathedral was used as a movie theater called the October cinema. It is a monument of federal importance.

== History ==
=== Context ===
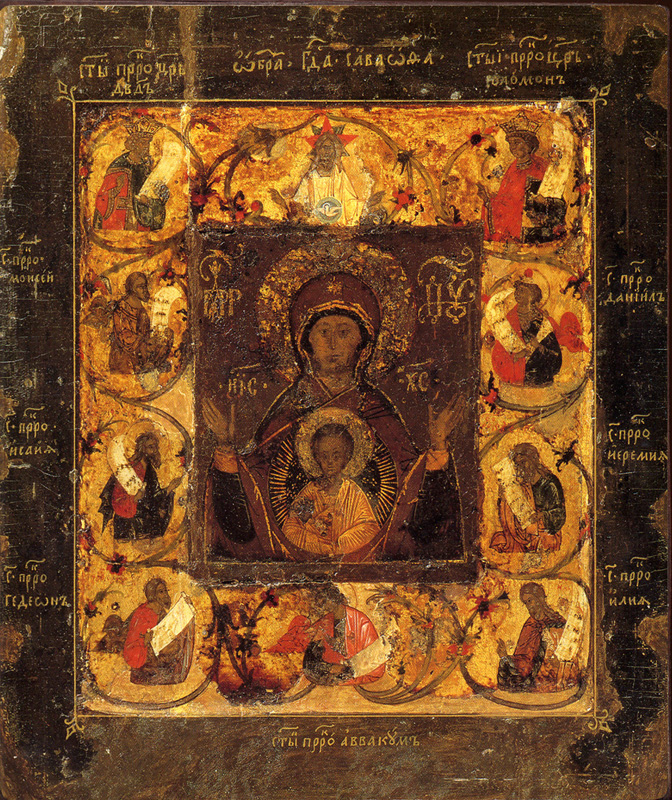
Theotokos of Kursk

The modern Cathedral of Our Lady of the "Omen" is on the site of the city fortress of Kursk from the early 17th century. In 1612, the city was captured and devastated by seventy thousand troops of Polish-Lithuanian invaders under the command of Hetman Zholkevsky. However, the city fortress remained impregnable to the enemies. It was heroically defended under the leadership of the voevoda stolnik Yuri Ignatyevich Tatishchev. The people of Kursk believed that their survival was due to the intervention of the Virgin Mary. In gratitude, they promised to build a monastery in honor of the Theotokos of Kursk, also known as the "Omen". This monastery was later moved to the royal chambers in Moscow.

By 1615, a wooden church had been built on the site of the modern cathedral to honor the Nativity of Mary. In 1615, Tsar Michael Fyodorovich Romanov ordered the return of the miracle-working Theotokos of Kursk the "Omen" to Kursk. By his own order in 1618, it was moved to the Nativity monastery from the Resurrection Cathedral in the city. In 1631, a fire caused by a lightning strike burned down all the monastery buildings.

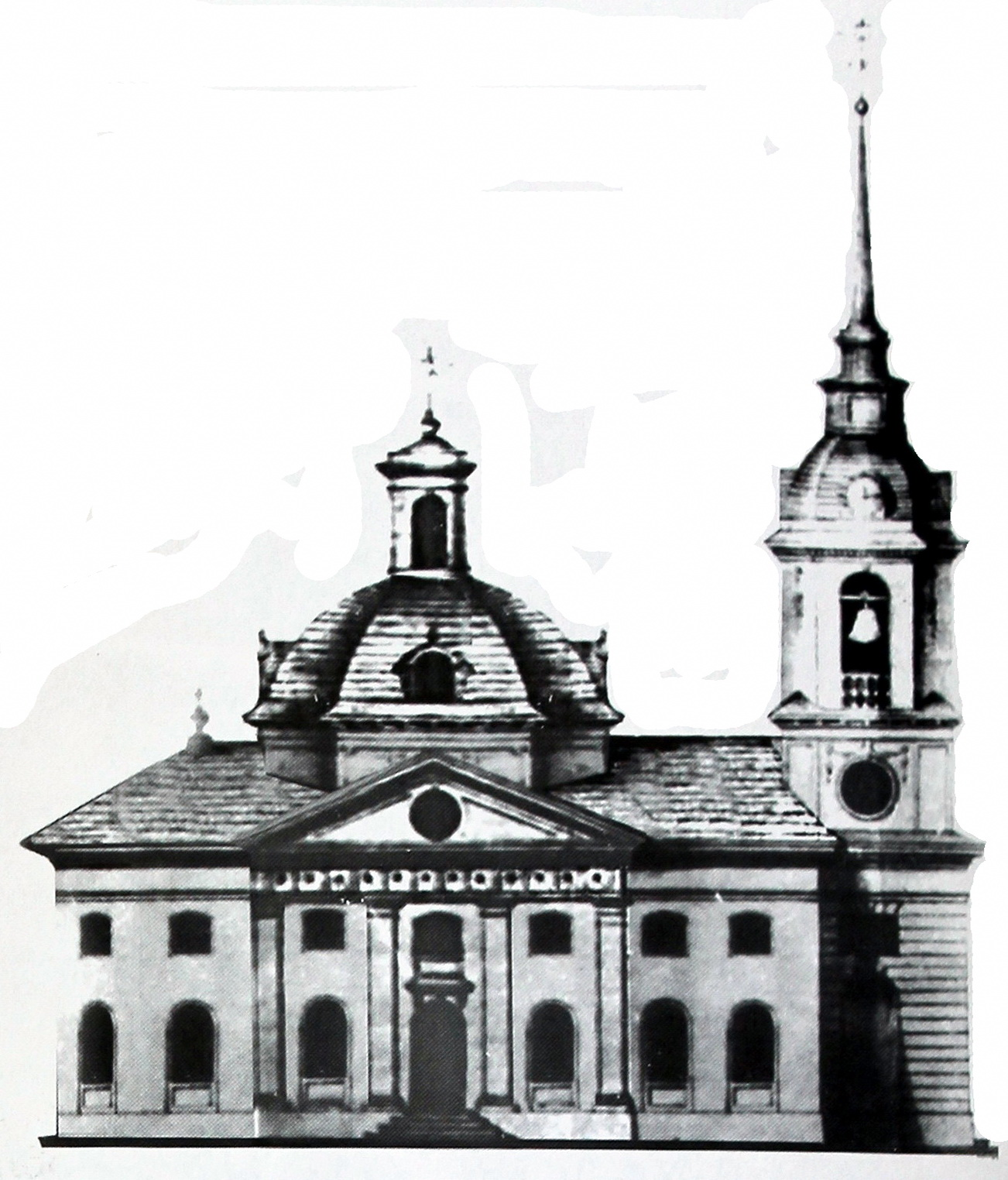
The first stone cathedral church in honor of the icon of the Mother of God "The Omen", built on the territory of the Kursk Cathedral in 1649-1680 years and dismantled in 1815 (the picture shows the cathedral after the reconstruction in the Baroque style in the second half of the 18th century).

In 1649, Tsar Alexis Mikhailovich ordered the construction of a stone cathedral called the "Omen" in honor of the Theotokos of Kursk. This cathedral replaced the original wooden one, which was built by Semyon Beliy and Sergey Kalugin. Beliy was a builder for the Moscow Order of Stone Affairs, and Kalugin was a clerk. The Tsar's treasury and private individuals paid for the construction.

In 1688, the sovereigns Ivan and Peter Alexeevich and Sophia Alexeevna were given a large bell as a gift. It was made by master Fyodor Matorin and weighed 57 pounds. It was used in the new stone church, which had two side chapels (St. Alexis, a man of God, and Demetrius of Solunsk). The bell was used for about two hundred years. In 1680, the cracked bell was removed from the bell tower and placed on a high pedestal in the northeastern part of the monastery fence. The new cathedral was 58 m long and 11.5 m wide. In 1752, it was plastered inside and out. Its only chapter was dismantled, and five were erected in its place. From 1771 to 1775, under the spiritual leader Archimandrite Victor (Lodyzhensky), the throne in the church was covered with gilded copper, depicting the Passion of Jesus, and the iconostasis was decorated with new paintings and gilding. During the renovations, church services were held in the Church of the Epiphany of the Lord. In 1775, the domes of the Cathedral of Our Lady of the "Omen" were gilded. In November 1814, during a service, pieces of plaster fell from the cathedral's dome. An examination of the building revealed cracks in the refectory vault and on the walls of the temple. These cracks were formed as a result of subsidence of its foundation. In 1815, the Cathedral of Our Lady of the "Omen" was dismantled.

=== Construction ===
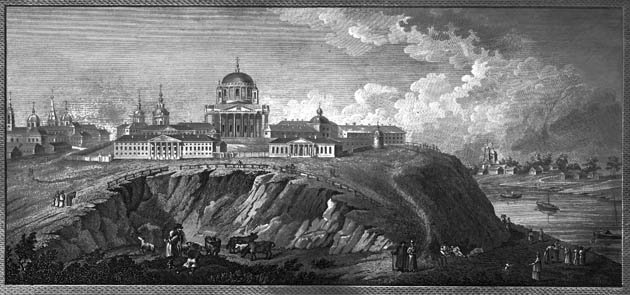
Kursk. Engraving by A. Ukhtomsky, 1821, after the drawing by I. Rambauer. In the center of the engraving the Cathedral of Our Lady of the Omen in its original form before the refectory with two bell towers was added in 1826. The western portico is clearly visible.

The construction of the Cathedral of Our Lady of the "Omen" began in 1816 and was finished 10 years later. The cathedral was started on June 4 (16), 1816 to honor the victory in the French Invasion of 1812. Archbishop Feoktist (Mochulsky) of Kursk and Belgorod decided to have Archimandrite Palladius (Belevtsev) of the Kursk Root Hermitage manage the construction. Palladius used to be an artillery officer, a native of the Kursk nobility, and the provincial architect P. K. Shmita helped him. The cathedral was built using donations from citizens and income from Znamensky Bogoroditsky monastery. Archbishop Theoktist, who died in 1818 and left a large sum in his will for the improvement of the temple, Governor Arkady Ivanovich Nelidov, representatives of the Kursk nobility, and merchants also made significant contributions. Privy Councillor Grigory Apollonovich Khomutov was an expert in architecture. He helped choose the masters and workers. He also worked with the best Moscow masonry contractor. The contractor personally supervised the work of Kaluga masons. The Kaluga masons built the walls of the temple. For many years, local historians in Kursk thought that the cathedral's design was by St. Petersburg architect A. I. Melnikov. However, no documentary evidence of his involvement has been found. The name of the cathedral's original architect is still unknown.

The main excavation works were carried out in the summer and fall of 1816. A hole was dug, and a stone foundation was laid on solid ground (without piles). Every year in the winter, materials for construction were obtained. From spring on, construction began directly, requiring a large number of different craftsmen and laborers. The cathedral was finished by 1826. At first, the cathedral was square with three six-column porticos on each side. In 1826, they added a refectory with two bell towers on the side facing the Alexander Nevsky Lavra. The northern bell tower had a big clock made in Germany in the 19th century. The clock had a big dial and sounded beautiful. People could hear the sound of the clock even in the city. It cost the Kursk diocese 600,000 rubles to build the cathedral.

Even though the finishing works were still going on, the cathedral was officially opened on January 13 (25), 1826. The cathedral's dedication was rushed because a funeral procession that was passing through Kursk from Taganrog carrying the ashes of the late Emperor Alexander I. Three days later, the cathedral received the coffin with the emperor's body. In 1832, a cast-iron iconostasis was installed. It had been ordered in 1824 at the Alexandrovsky foundry in St. Petersburg. Its manufacture was so difficult that it took six years to create, deliver, and install it. In 1853, a side chapel was built in the lower church according to the design of the Moscow architect N. I. Kozlovsky. In 1854, the architect closed and connected brick walls with windows and doors to the passages in the monastery fence north and west porticos. This created two entrance galleries, and a third gallery led into the church from the bishop's house. On weekdays, church members passed through the gate across from the Church of the Resurrection, around the back of the cathedral, and went up the steps of the southern entrance. In 1865, the church was rebuilt, and the second floor was removed. In 1866, three large bells were placed on the cathedral's bell tower. The largest bell weighed 1045 poods and cost more than 20,000 rubles. It was donated by a merchant from Belgorod named N. I. Chumichev. Another bell, weighing 500 poods, was cast at the Samgin factory with donations from the mayor, D. V. Tikhonov, and the Kursk city society. It is known that the cathedral was originally painted a bluish-gray color with white details, which was determined by studying historical sources and examining all layers of plaster on the building's facades at different heights.

In 1893, during the Easter holidays, Father John Sergiev, the archpriest of the Cathedral of the "Omen" in Kronstadt, led a special church service called the Divine Litarge in the Saint Andrew's Cathedral of Kronstadt. Father John would later become known as Saint Protoiereus John of Kronstadt.

Emperor Nicholas II visited the Cathedral of Our Lady of the "Omen" twice. The first time was on September 1 (14), 1902. He arrived in Kursk on that day. He was there for large-scale military maneuvers to the west of the city. The icon of the Theotokos of Kursk the "Omen" was moved to the Kursk Root Hermitage especially for the Emperor's visit. The emperor visited the cathedral again on November 22 (December 5), 1914. This was when Nicholas II was going to the Caucasus with the active army and stopped in Kursk.

=== Interior before Revolution ===
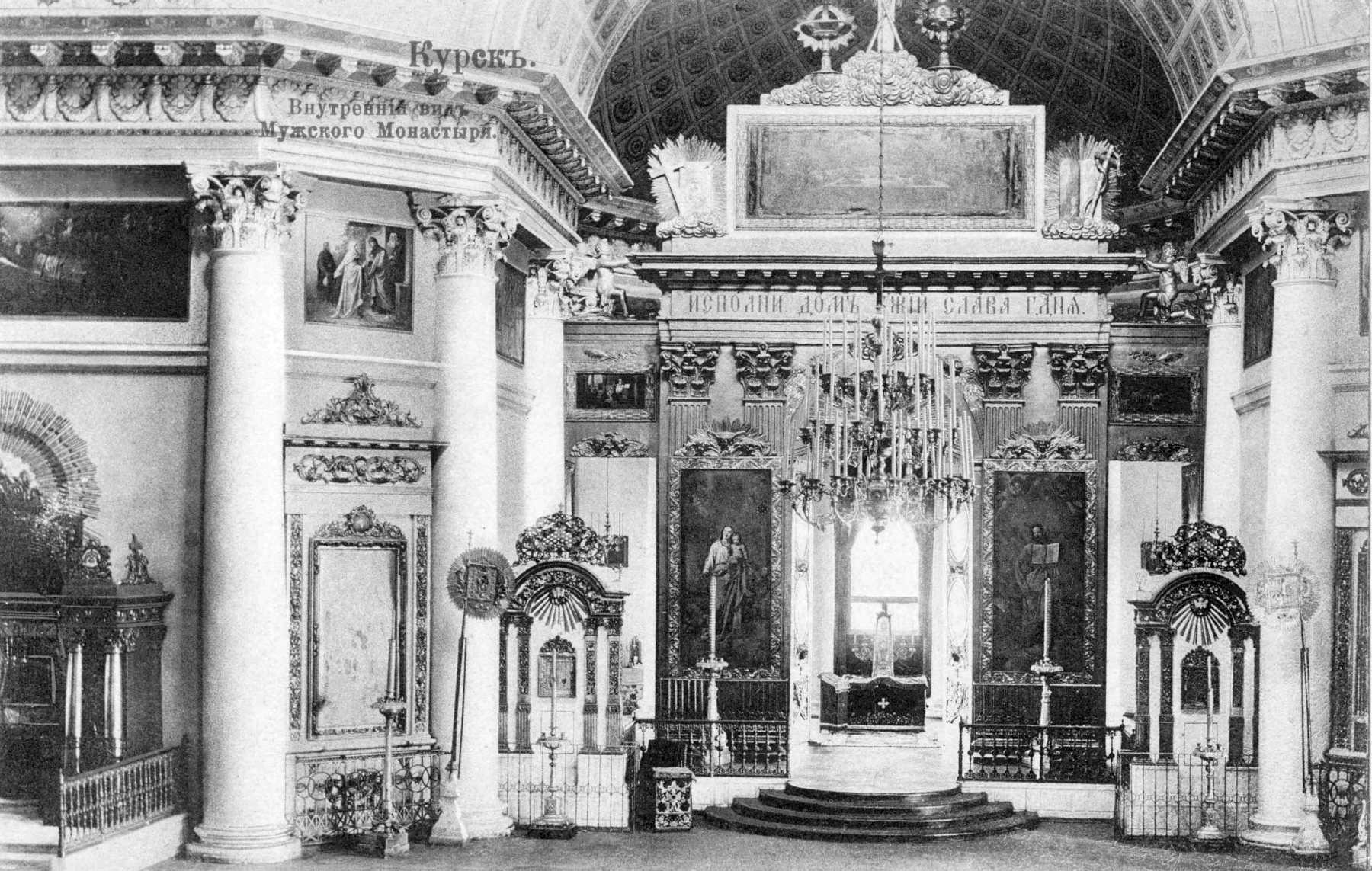
Interior view of the cathedral towards the high altar. Postcard from the beginning of the 20th century. On the left is a part of the northern nave with a canopy for the Kursk Korenaya icon of the Mother of God of the "Omen".

The cathedral walls were decorated with alabaster under white marble and with engaged columns, stucco on biblical subjects, and 23 paintings on religious motives. The paintings were created by icon painter Rukavitsyn and pasted on the walls. The dome was painted using an outdoor technique. The main altar of the cathedral was dedicated to the Theotokos of Kursk. There was also a chapel on the southern side dedicated to St. Mitrofany of Voronezh and Alexander Nevsky, and a chapel on the northern side dedicated to Tikhon of Zadonsk and Seraphim of Sarov. On the southern side of the cathedral, there was also a chapel dedicated to St. Nicholas of Myra. Above the refectory was originally a church with three priests. It was named for the Presentation of the Lord, St. Nicholas and St. Anthony and Theodosius of Pechersk. This church was abolished in 1837. The iconostases of the side chapels were made of gilded wood, and the one-tier iconostasis of the main altar had an unusual artistic solution — it was cast in cast iron and gilded. All the icons on the main iconostasis were painted on canvas by the St. Petersburg artist Borghi for 15,000 rubles. The king's gate, north and south gates were also made of cast iron and gilded. To the left of the iconostasis of the main altar, high enough there was a large silver casket for the Theotokos of Kursk. It had a cast-iron with gilded shade, to which several stone steps led. In front of the icon hung an expensive velvet veil embroidered with gold, silver, and pearls.

In the middle of the cathedral was a big, three-tiered bishop's cathedra. It was covered in expensive red cloth. From there, the bishop could be seen clearly by those praying throughout the church.

The cathedral could hold more than 5,000 church members, and its main altar could easily fit a hundred clergy. In the two aisles on the sides of the church, which were like their own small temples, up to 500 people could fit in each aisle.

==== Relics of the Cathedral of Our Lady of the "Omen" before the October Revolution ====
In the Cathedral of Our Lady of the "Omen", there was a gold ribbon with pearls and precious stones, made in 1598. Tsar Feodor Ioannovich gave it to the icon of the Sign of the Mother of God. There were eight letters signed by Michael Feodorovich (1613–1645), Alexis Mikhailovich (1645–1676), and Patriarch Filaret (1608–1610, 1619–1633). The Gospel of 1689 on Alexandrian paper; a silver "panikadil" (lamp) weighing more than 4 pounds, decorated with chains of apples and flowers and pendants, with a crucifix at the top and a silver apple at the bottom, donated in 1700 by A. I. Khlyustin[49] and the icon of Archangel Michael. The icon was given by the participants of the War of 1812. It was granted to the soldiers for bravery by Grand Duke Mikhail Pavlovich. The cathedral also kept two icons of the Kursk militia during the Crimean War of 1853–1856. One of these icons —the Omen— was blessed by Archbishop Iliodor before the Kursk army went into battle.

=== An attempt on the icon of the Omen ===
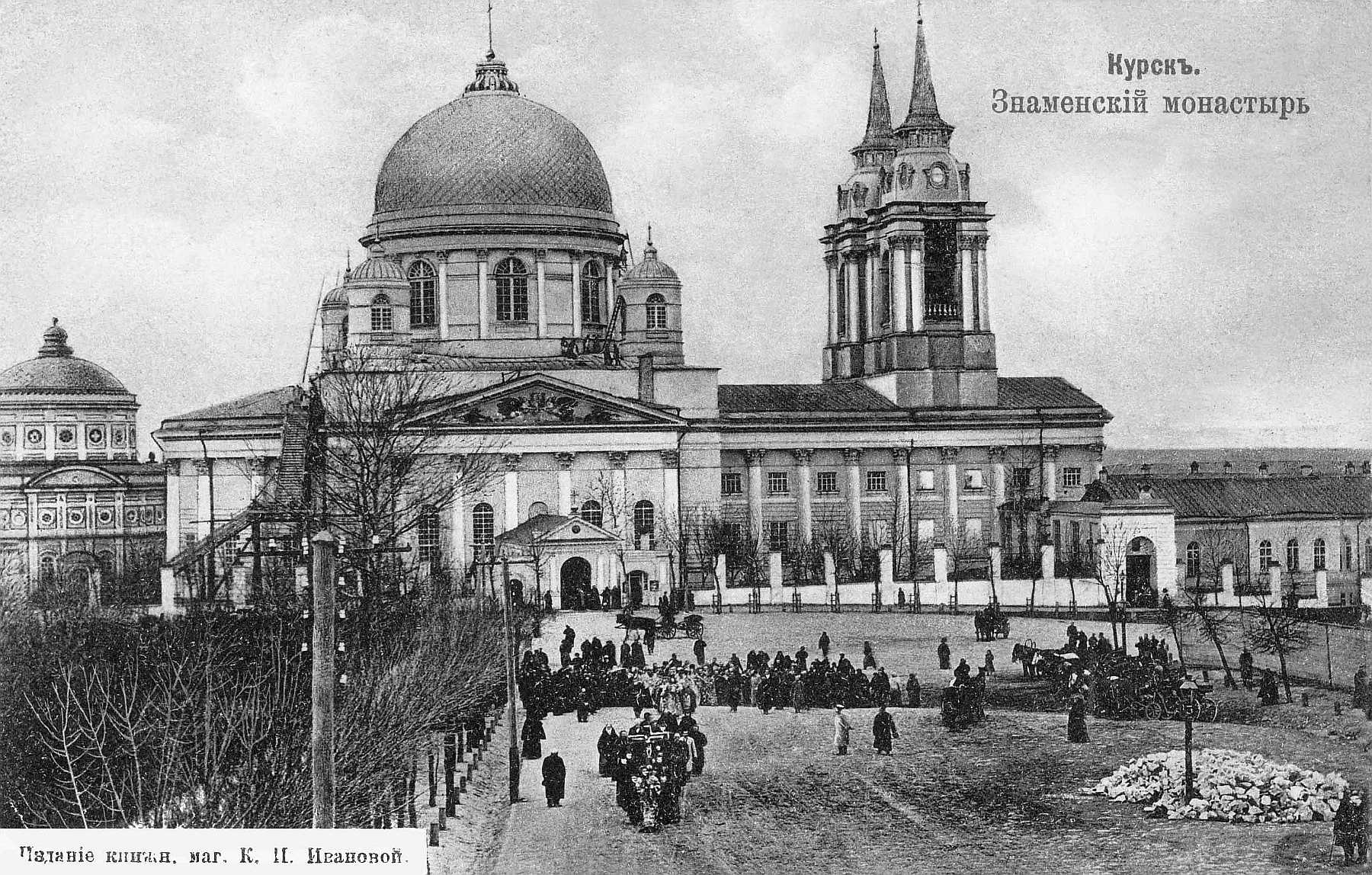
Cathedral of Our Lady of "the Omen", April 18 (30), 1898. Postcard from the beginning of the 20th century. At the apse of the Cathedral scaffolding was erected to eliminate the consequences of the explosion made by A. G. Ufimtsev on March 8 (21), 1898. The workers can be seen above the gable at the small chapter. To the left of the Cathedral there is the Church of the Resurrection, to the right there is the Bishop's House.

On March 8 (21), 1898, at 1:50 a.m., there was an explosion in the cathedral. Monks, an archimandrite, a bishop, and city authorities discovered the destruction. They found fragments of plaster, wood, stucco, fabric, a broken north door, a bent candlestick for 150 candles, and a damaged shade over the icon the Omen. A piece of a wall flew off, damaging the icon on the opposite wall. All the glass, including the dome, was broken. The icon itself was not damaged, although the glass was shattered and the risa was covered with soot. They found the remains of an explosive device — it was a metal box with wires and a clock mechanism. The next morning, thousands of people came together for a prayer service. The investigation was completed in 1901. The people who were arrested were: Ufimtsev (20 years old), Kishkin (21), Kamenev (22), and Lagutin (21). The explosion was meant to make people lose their faith. The bomb was set off on March 7 during the service, and the timing was set for 1:30 to avoid causing casualties. The perpetrators were young and showed remorse, so the trial was replaced by exile: Ufimtsev was sent to Akmolinsk for 5 years, and the others were sent to Eastern Siberia for 2 years. The authorities denied rumors that the explosion was organized by monks.

=== After the October Revolution ===
Plan of the first floor of the October movie theater

After the October Revolution, the community of believers owned the Cathedral of Our Lady of the "Omen" until 1932. In April 1918, the stolen icon was found by two girls who were washing clothes in the river. The precious robe was not found, so the icon was decorated with a silver frame. In 1919, the icon left Kursk with the Volunteer Army of the Armed Forces of South Russia, and in 1920, it crossed the Russian border.

In 1932, the church was closed, and the cathedral was converted into a movie theater called October. Between 1935 and 1936, the domes, bell towers, northern portico, and fence were demolished. The central dome was left untouched. The building was converted into a cinema with 700 seats, and it opened on September 23, 1937, with the film Peter the Great.

During the war years, the building was damaged. It was burned, and the ceilings collapsed. The paintings inside were destroyed. After the war ended and Kursk was freed, the building was used for different things. It was used as a warehouse, a prison, and then a factory. In 1948, it was given to a movie theater. By 1956, the reconstruction was completed. It had a round foyer with a dome and columns, Red and Green auditoriums, and a parabolic dome. On 11 August 1956, the cinema October reopened. It was visited daily by about 9,000 spectators.

=== After the Russian Orthodox Church returning ===
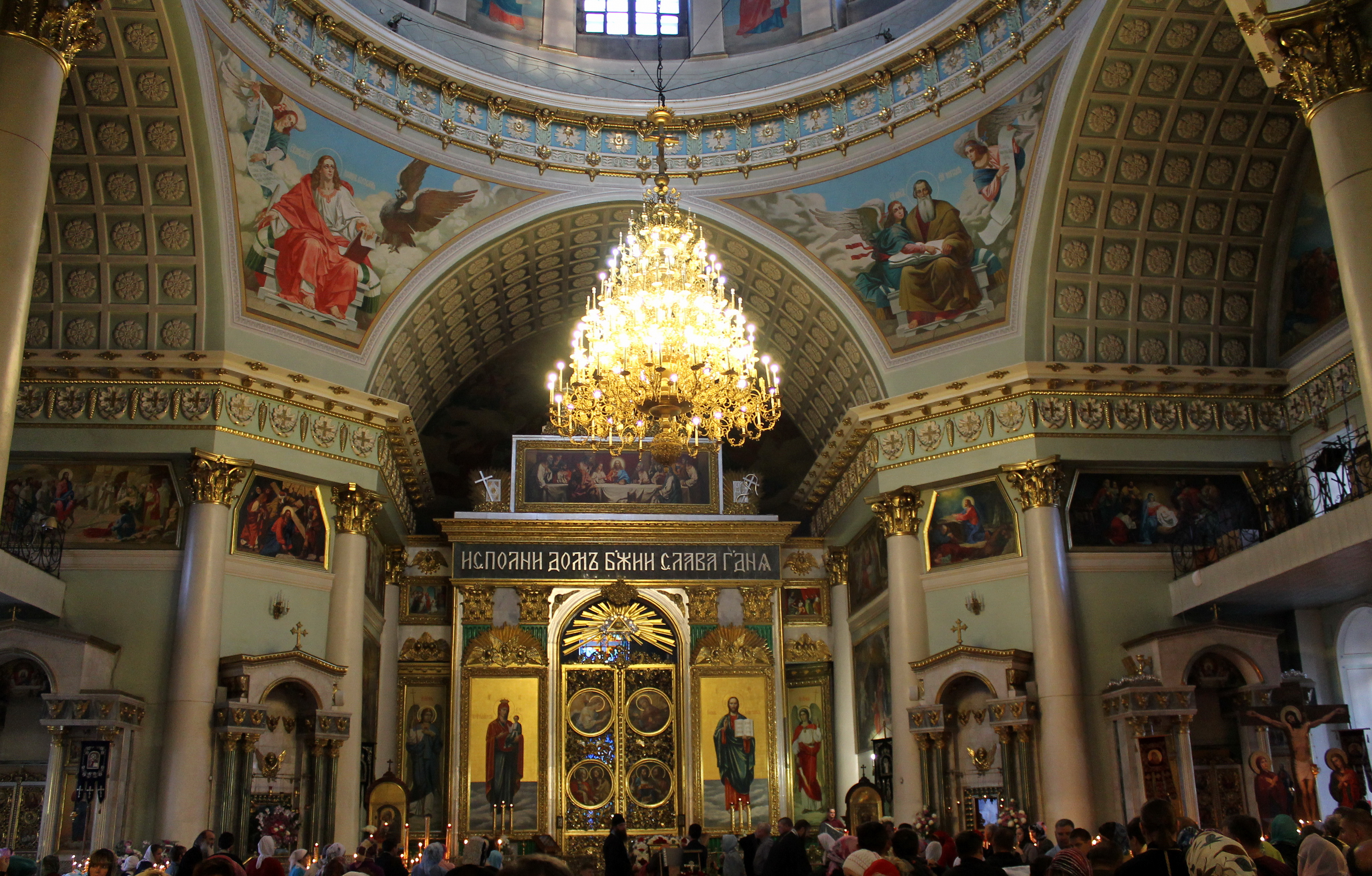
The Cathedral's interior in 2012

In 1992, the Russian Orthodox Church took control of the construction of the Cathedral of Our Lady of the "Omen" again. In 1993, the cathedral received an exact copy of the Theotokos of Kursk, which was made in 1902.

Reconstruction began according to the project of V. P. Semenikhin in 1999. About 600 cubic meters of reinforced concrete were dismantled, and the altar, sub-dome parts, engaged columns, and stucco were restored. The roof was covered with copper. On November 16, 2000, Metropolitan Yuvenaly consecrated the main altar. In 2001, stained glass windows and the first icons were installed, and in 2003, 11 bells weighing 2,950 kilograms were added. By 2004, the altar's decorations were finished, and the scaffolding was taken down.

On July 20, 2004, the relics of Seraphim of Sarov were brought to the cathedral. On the night of May 1, 2006, the Theotokos of Kursk, which was found in Moscow on June 11, 2006, was stolen. It was later returned to the cathedral.

In 2009, Patriarch Kirill temporarily brought the Kursk Root Hermitage icon to the cathedral. On October 1, President Medvedev visited the cathedral. He visited the cathedral again in 2013, this time as Prime Minister. Now, the cathedral holds daily services. Every Friday, hundreds of believers gather for a prayer service in front of the Theotokos of Kursk, also known as the Omen.

== Architecture and decorations ==
=== The nave ===
The cathedral was built in the classicism style, which is a type of architecture from the Western European Renaissance. It has a traditional cross-in-square construction, with a cruciform design and a significantly elongated western part. The Cathedral of Our Lady of the "Omen" is at an angle from the main street, Lenin Street, and Red Square, rather than straight. The main part of the cathedral is shaped like a cube. On top of the cube is a huge drum that lets in a lot of light. This drum is surrounded by columns that are half the height of the columns around it. The top of the cathedral was originally shaped like a half-sphere. This half-sphere was 20 meters wide. It was shaped like this until the 1950s. The original dome was made entirely of well-fired bricks, which were arranged in layers with strong mortar. The builders made sure the previous layers set well before adding the next one. The dome was one meter thick at the base and about 80 centimeters thick at the top. During the next remodeling of the building in the 1950s, this dome was replaced by another parabolic profile. The sub-dome is 48 meters high. The cathedral is 76.62 m long and 31.14 m wide at its widest part. The cathedral is made of perfectly burnt brick, which has kept it very strong. The white stone cornices and other parts of the cathedral's architecture were made by stonecutters from Myachkovo. This village is near Moscow, and its quarries supplied stone for white-stone buildings in Moscow for several hundred years. The base walls are 5.7 meters thick. The southern part of the temple had a pediment with a portal and six columns of the Corinthian order. There were three galleries leading into the cathedral and an entrance through the southern pediment. Currently, all three porticos of the cathedral (south, north, and west) are uncovered, and the covered galleries have been dismantled. The building was crowned with four small chapters, in addition to the main dome. All the domes were covered with white iron and painted with aluminum, while the crosses and heads were covered with blackened gold. The small chapters, which were lost in 1935 and restored to their original form after the cathedral was returned to the faithful, have hemispherical domes and are not as slender as the large dome, which after reconstruction has the shape of a paraboloid rather than a hemisphere.

The cathedral's interior has been restored to look as it did before the revolution. Architect V. P. Semenikhin recreated all the stucco decorations using old samples from the former molding on the frieze and historical photographs. He also restored sixteen internal engaged columns. In the eastern part of the main part of the cathedral, the aisles and the haylofts, which are lined with granite, and in the northern and southern parts there are choirs.

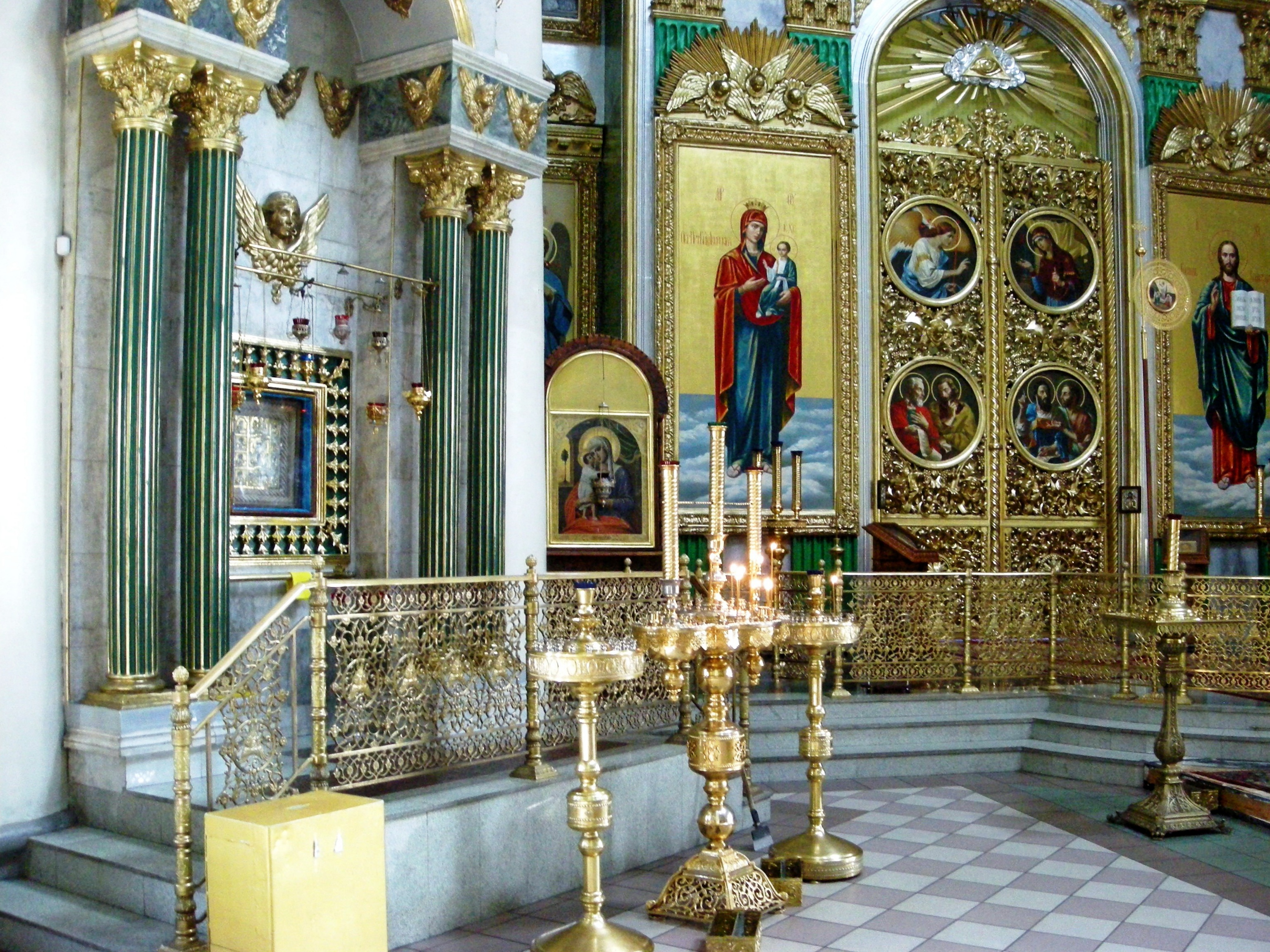
Shadow, where a list from the icon "The Omen" is placed.

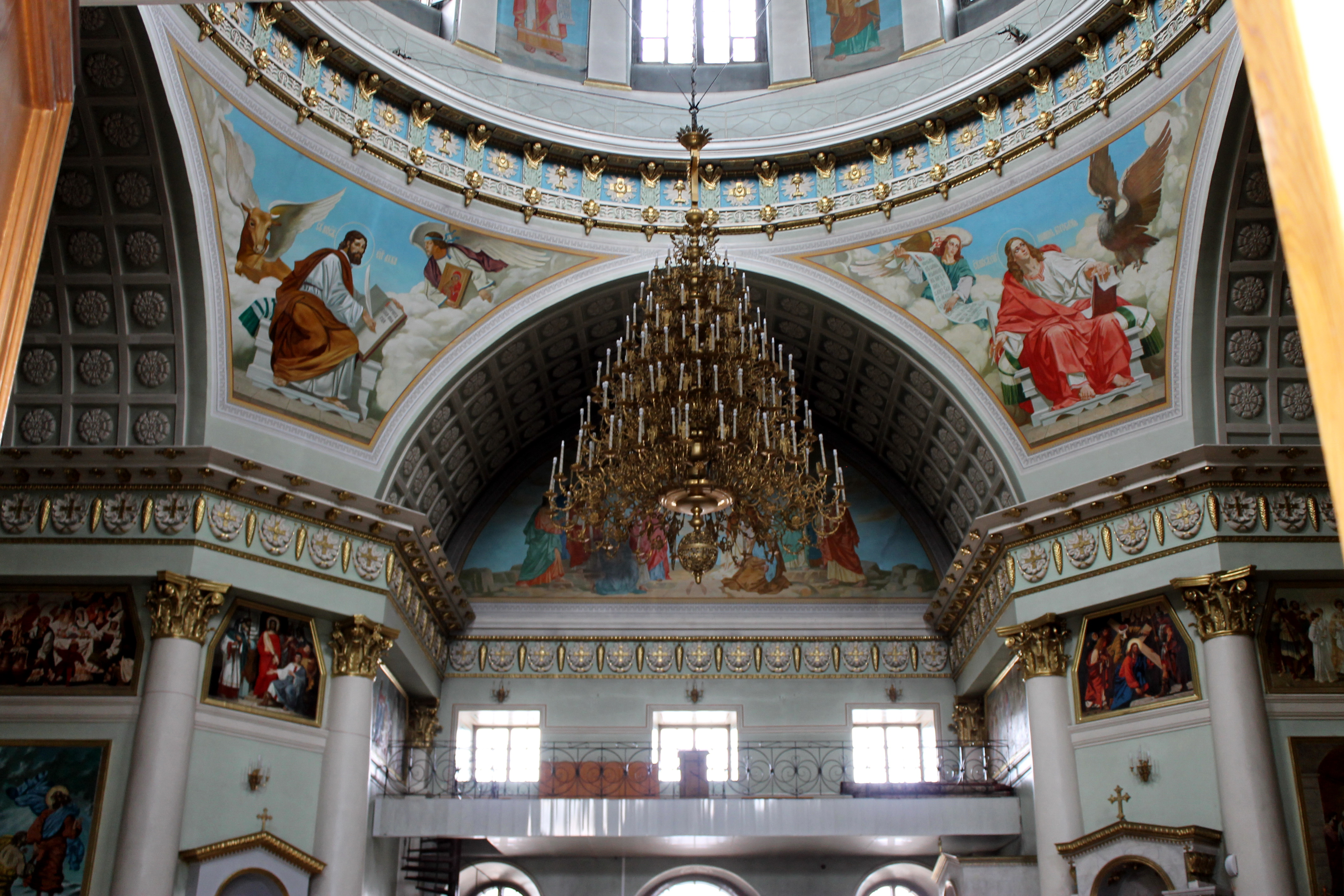
Northern choirs

The cathedral's interior is decorated by a team of artists from the Russian Academy of Arts in St. Petersburg, led by Academician of Painting A. K. Bystrov. This team also painted the Cathedral of Christ the Savior in Moscow. The iconostasis, a special table with icons, has a high metal frame, and icons made by St. Petersburg artists are placed on it. In the altar part of the cathedral, there is a stained glass icon of the Theotokos of Kursk, also known as the Omen. There are also four bright stained glass windows in the high altar windows. These windows depict St. Basil the Great, Gregory the Theologian, St. John Chrysostom, and St. Nicholas Myra. These stained-glass windows were made by the St. Petersburg artists V. V. Perkhun, P. M. Yakipchuk, and A. Y. Sinitsa. Between the windows are images of the apostles. The wall paintings were made by Y. A. Sinitsa, V. V. Perkhun, A. S. Krivonos, and A. A. Poghosyan. The dome drum features images of eight Old Testament prophets: Jeremiah, Isaiah, Zechariah, Ezekiel, David, Solomon, Hosea, and Elijah. These were created by A. A. Zhivaev, a respected artist from Russia. A. Zhivaev. Under the dome of the cathedral, there is a picture of the Blessed Virgin Mary on a throne with angels around her. There are also pictures of St. Seraphim of Sarov, St. Sergius of Radonezh, and thirty-six other saints from Russia. These include the holy Royal Passion-Bearers Nicholas II and Alexandra and their children.

There is a large golden "panikadil" (chandelier) under the dome. It weighs 2.5 tons, is 3.5 meters wide, and 6.5 meters high. It is finely cast and forged, and has twelve tiers of candles. It was made in the workshops of the production enterprise of the Moscow Patriarchate Sofrino.

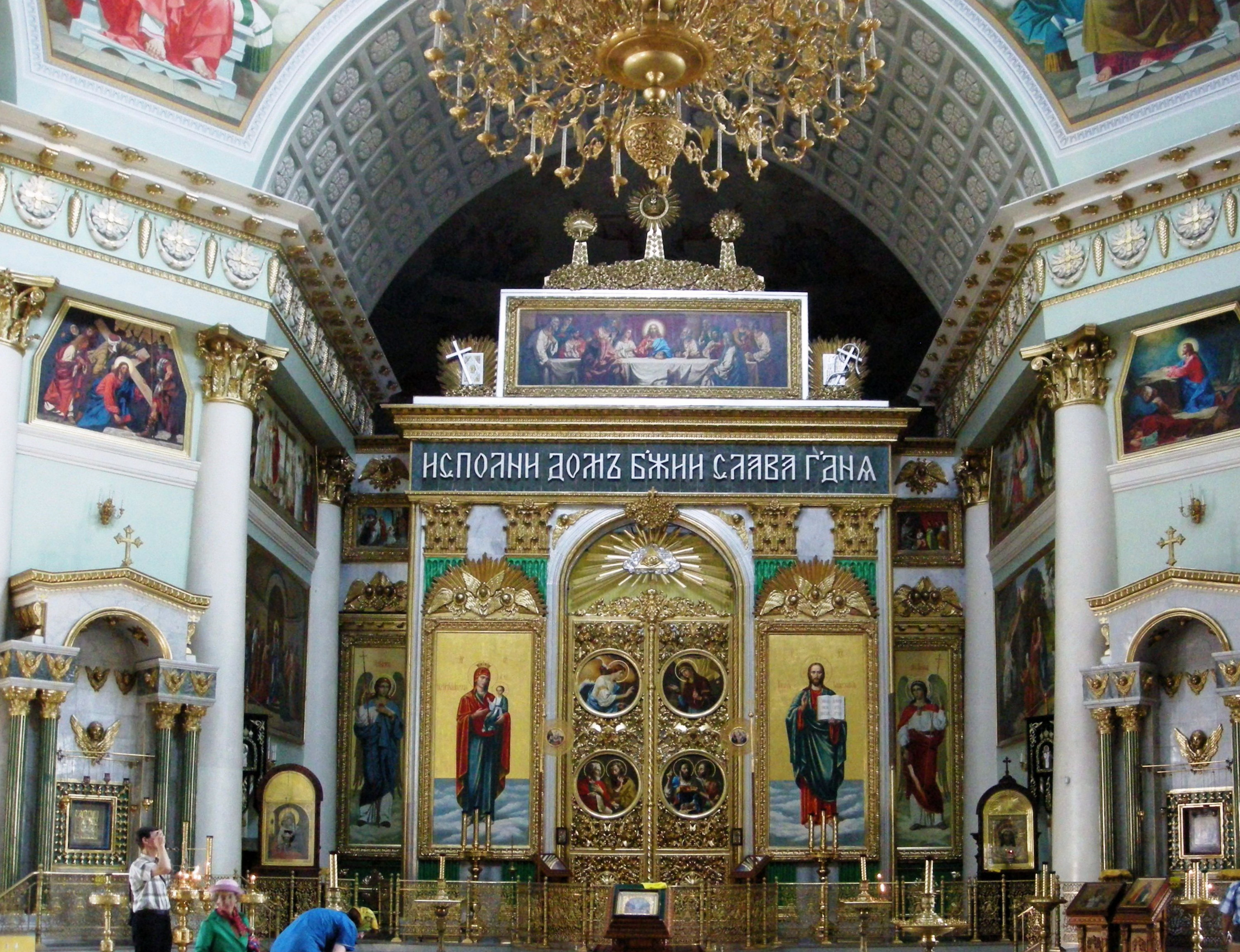
Main iconostasis

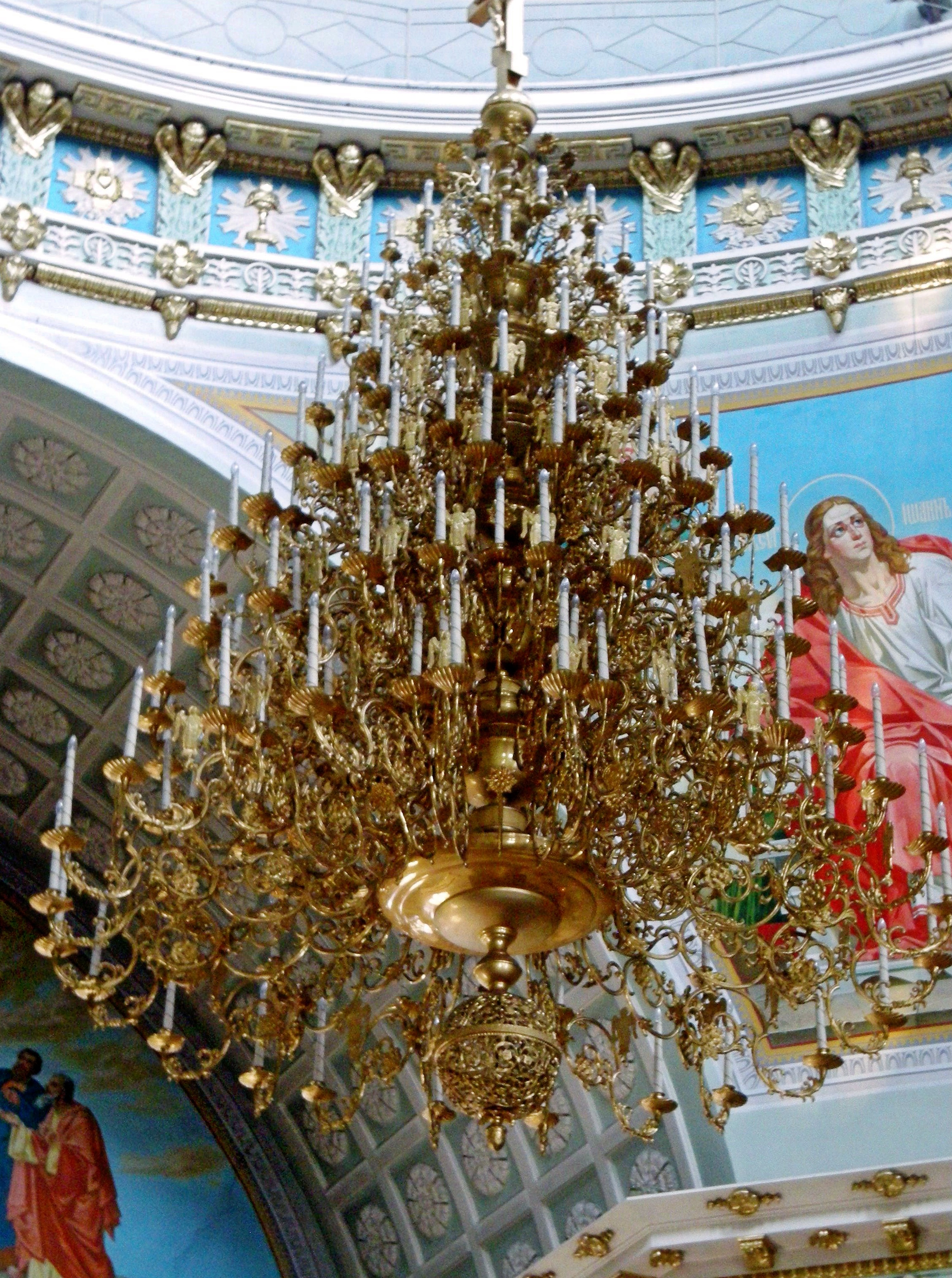
Golden-gilded panikladil in the subdome space

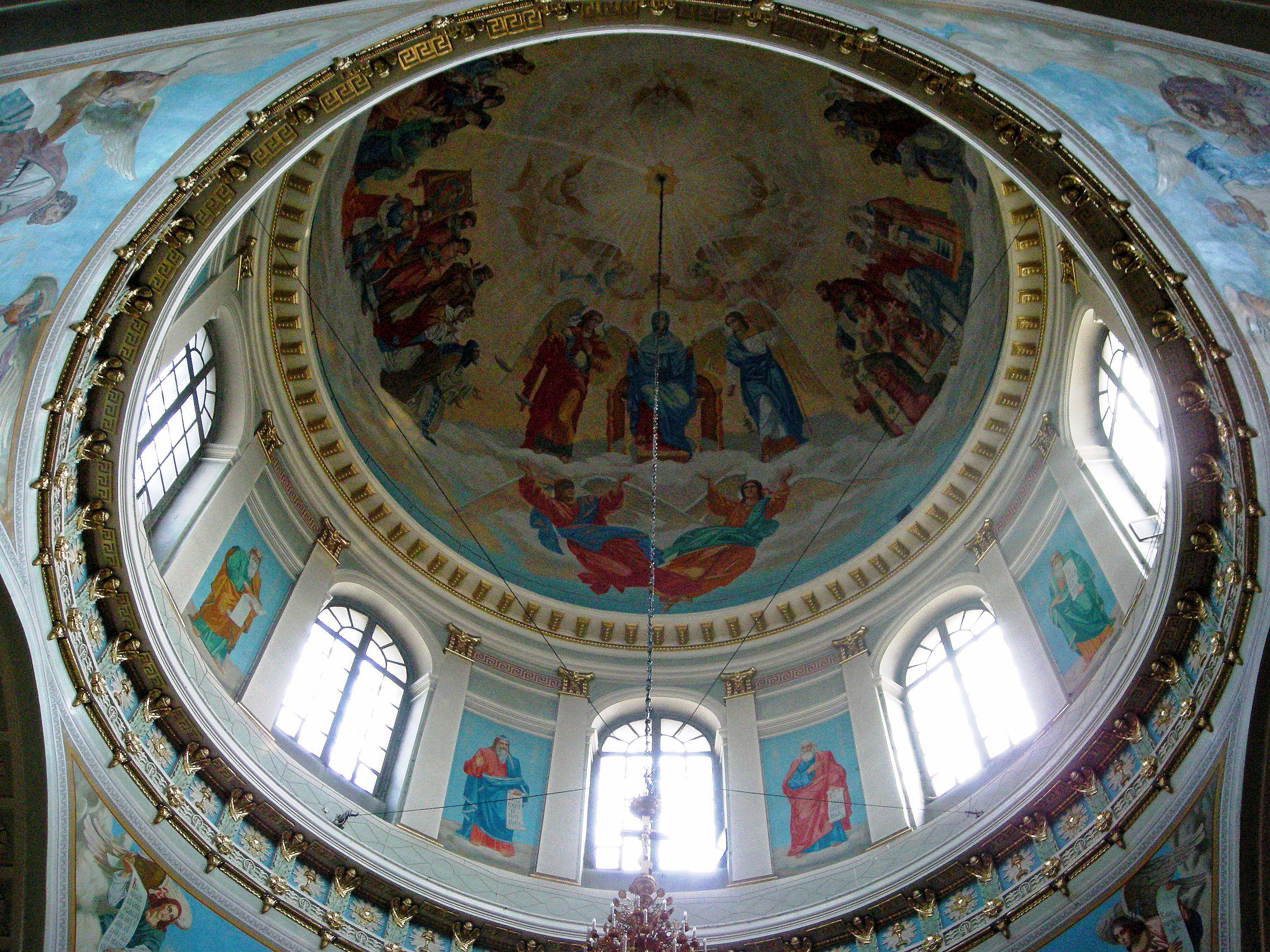
Dome and light drum painting

=== Bell tower ===
Before the Revolution, the bell tower had two towers above the refectory, with a clock on the northern one. During the last rebuilding of the church, it was decided not to restore the belfries, which were demolished in 1935. This was because it would make the internal reconstruction of the building more complicated and increase the cost of the project. It would mean tearing down the attic ceiling of the refectory, which would reduce the usable area of both floors and change their clear rectangular layout. It would also destroy the ventilation, heating, and power supply systems of the building and make the emergency evacuation routes worse. Another argument was that the paired bell towers, a technique not used in Russian Orthodox architecture, was wrong for the church. The representatives of the Kursk diocese did not agree to remove the ceilings of the two former movie theaters. This was necessary to restore the belfries to their original location. Instead, the northern belfry was added to the outside of the refectory. All levels of the new bell tower are rectangular, stretching along the main building. Its first level ends with a semicircular roof, which does not match the three classically triangular roofs of the main building. The east and west openings of the second tier's bell platform are arched, while the north and south openings are rectangular. The bell tower ends with a tall, gilded cross. It has 11 bells, weighing a total of 2,950 kilograms. The largest bell weighs 1,380 kilograms.

=== Refectory ===
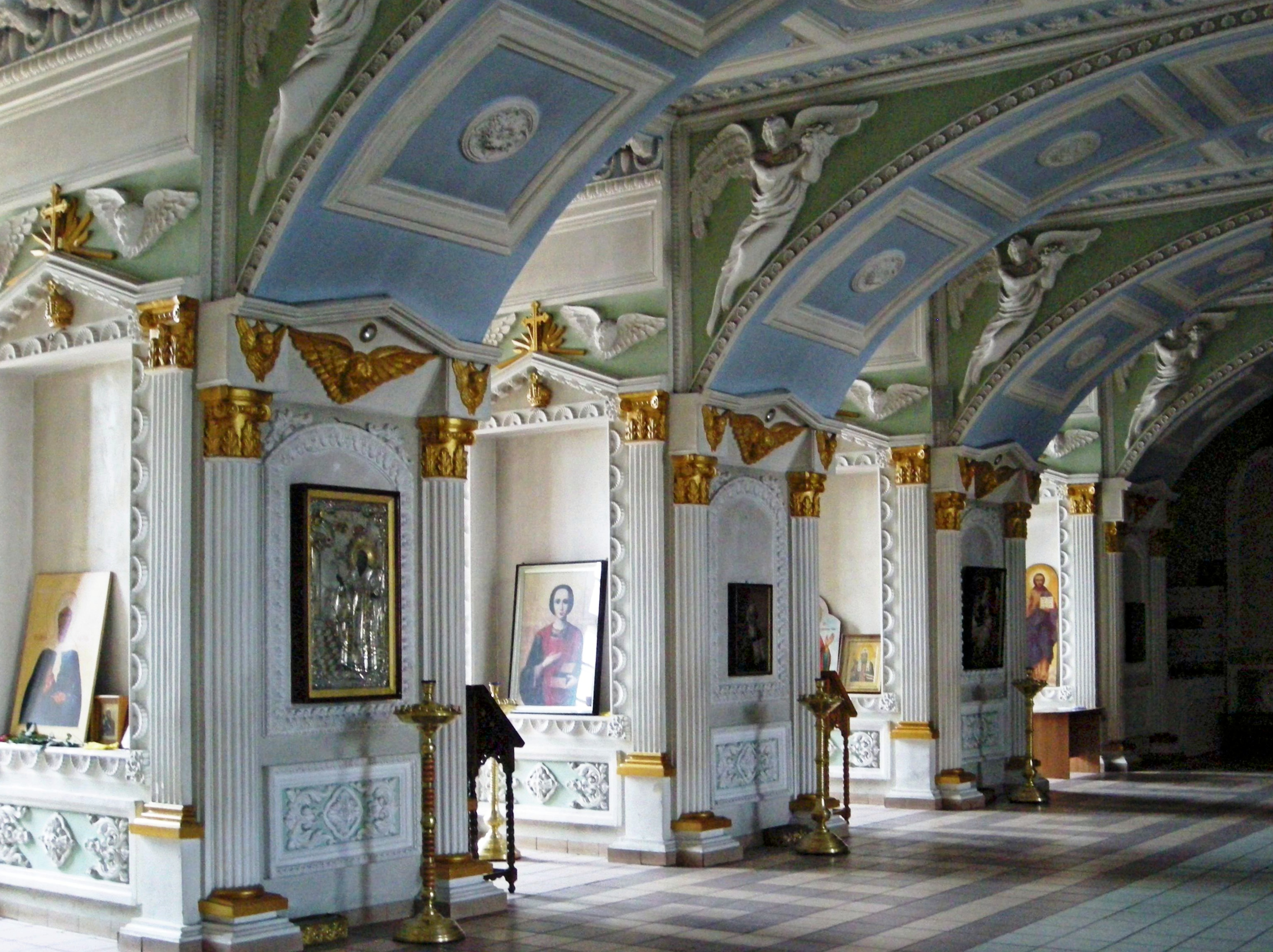
The first floor of the refectory of the Cathedral of our Lady of the Omen. Icons are placed on the pylons

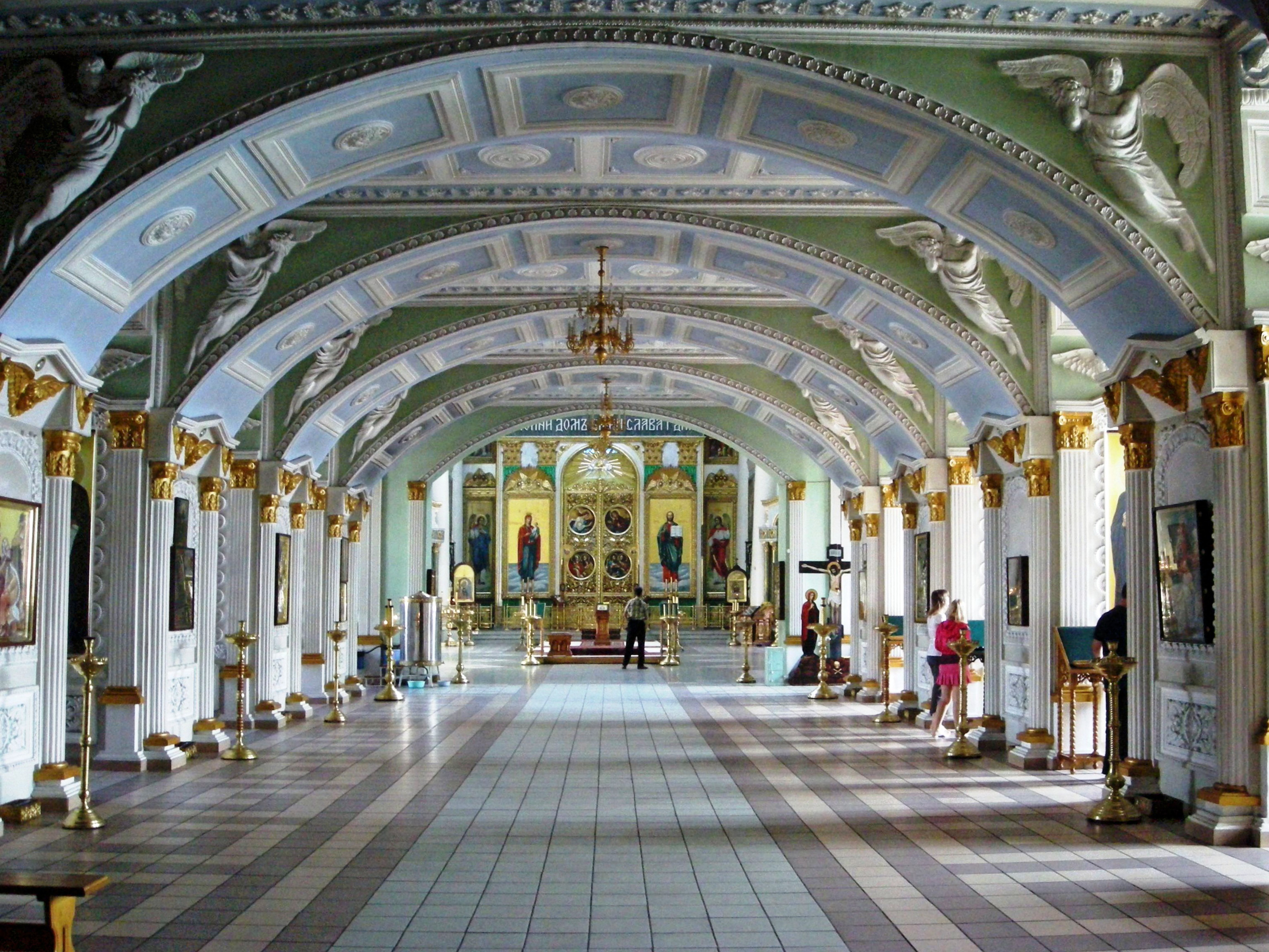
The first floor of the refectory of the Cathedral of our Lady of "the Omen". Icons are placed on the pylons

The cathedral refectory has changed since the Revolution. Before, it was one story and two windows. After the cathedral was returned to the Kursk diocese, a church named for the Icon of the Our Lady Derzhavnaya was built on the second floor of the refectory. When creating the project to restore the cathedral, Metropolitan Yuvenaly did not approve of destroying it, so the refectory is now lower. This makes the high dome part of the temple stand out more. The refectory also has impressive columns with icons on them and coffered ceilings with fancy moldings.

=== Relics ===
The relics described above that were kept in the Cathedral of Our Lady of the "Omen" before the October Revolution are now lost. In 1919, the monastery's property was taken and given to the state. The Theotokos of Kursk icon was taken from the cathedral in 1919 and has been in the Synod of Bishops Cathedral of the "Omen" since 1957. Since 2009, it has been brought to Russia every year for a short period of time to be worshipped within the walls of the Kursk Cathedral of Our Lady of the "Omen" during the summer or autumn procession.

Today, the cathedral has an exact copy of this icon. It was written by monks from the "Omen" Monastery in 1902 and blessed on the original. During the Soviet era, when the church was persecuted, believers kept this list safe. In 1993, they moved it to the Cathedral of Our Lady of the "Omen".

The Cathedral of Our Lady of the "Omen" currently houses several relics, including the revered image of St. John of Shanghai and San Francisco, along with a fragment of his relics. This relic was donated by representatives of the Russian Orthodox Church Abroad during their visit to Kursk in 2004 and is kept in the cathedral's altar. Another relic is the image of the Matrona of Moscow with a part of her relics. This relic was given to Archbishop Herman of Kursk and Rylsk by His Holiness Patriarch Alexy II of Moscow and All Russia. The cathedral also holds the image of St. Seraphim of Sarov with a part of his relics. It also holds a cross reliquary with a part of the Tree of the True Cross of the Lord and parts of the relics of St. Andrew the Apostle, St. Panteleon the Great Martyr, St. Sylvester, St. Kallinikos the Martyr, and St. Mammes the Martyr.

=== Reviews and critics ===
S. I. Fedorov (1915–2005), a candidate in art history, was the main architect of Kursk (1956–1958) and Orel (1958–1965). In his book Notes from the Front Bag: Memoirs of an Architect (1995) wrote about The Cathedral of Our Lady of the "Omen":

One of Kursk's main attractions is the Cathedral of Our Lady of the "Omen". It is a magnificent example of triumphal architecture from the late Russian Classicism era. It has become an important part of the Red Square ensemble, as well as the architectural and artistic image of the entire city and the modern cultural life of Kursk.

In his work Cathedrals, Churches, Chapels of Kursk (1998), local historian V. B. Stepanov describes the temple like this:

The Cathedral of Our Lady of the "Omen" is the most famous old building in Kursk. It is the main architectural feature of the historical center of the city.

V. F. Gabel and I. N. Gulin also had good things to say about the cathedral in their book Kursk (1951):

The Cathedral of Our Lady of the "Omen", built between 1816 and 1826, is a great example of the Russian classical style. It was built with exceptional skill. The cathedral's placement in the city plan is another success. It solved the architectural and town-planning problems. Located on a large square, The Cathedral of Our Lady of the "Omen" stands tall above the surrounding buildings, giving the whole neighborhood a unique look.

Kursk local historian and journalist V. V. Kryukov is not happy with the modern look of The Cathedral of Our Lady of the "Omen" after its latest reconstruction. He points out that the main dome of the cathedral is shaped like a parabola, while the four restored small towers are shaped like hemispheres. In the neighborhood, the towers look less slender and more flat. This is especially noticeable when one looks at them up close. In Kryukov's opinion, the reconstruction changed the cathedral's appearance. The main dome, with its light sub-dome drum, looks less slender (the cathedral "pulled its head into its shoulders"). The cathedral was restored with four small towers. Before, the cathedral was at an angle to the axis of Lenin Street and Red Square. Now, it looks in one direction, and all its five chapters look slightly in another.

V. V. Kryukov finds significant problems with the appearance of the new bell tower attached to the north side of the cathedral. The second tier of the tower looks more massive than the first. This violates one of the basic architectural principles of Russian bell towers. According to this principle, the diagonals of each overlying tier should be increasingly directed to the sky compared to the underlying ones. Not following this rule means that the bell tower does not have the right mix of lightness and stability. The tower looks unstable because its tiers are not square, but rectangular, and they are not aligned with the main building. The semicircular top of the first tier of the bell tower does not match the three triangular tops of the main building. V. V. Kryukov also points out that the arched openings on the east and north sides of the bell platform do not match the rectangular openings on the north and south sides.

== In art and philatery ==
=== In paintings ===
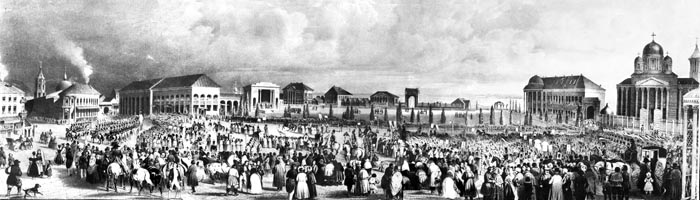
The Omen taking away, 1839. Lithograph by Bishebois, Adam and Bouchaud from the original by F. A. Junkovsky. On the right is the Cathedral of Our Lady of "The Omen"

The Cathedral of Our Lady of the "Omen" is shown on the engraving Kursk by A. G. Ukhtomsky in 1821. It is based on a drawing by I. Rambauer. The drawing shows a view of the so-called City part of the provincial Kursk from the slope of the Zakurnaya part of the city. It is interesting that in the engraving, the cathedral, which is in the center of the image, still looks like it did originally. It still has three porticos, but it does not have the refectory with two bell towers that was added in 1826.

Another artistic depiction of The Cathedral of Our Lady of the "Omen" is the 1839 lithograph Removal of the Icon by Bichebois, Adam and Bouchaud, made in Paris from an original by F. A. Junkovsky. One of the copies of this lithograph is kept in the State Russian Museum. The lithograph shows the Red Square of Kursk on the day the Theotokos of Kursk was taken out of the Cathedral of Our Lady of the "Omen" before the beginning of the procession to the Kursk Root Monastery Hermitage of the Nativity of the Virgin Mary. The cathedral is in the right side of the picture, and it looks wrong. It has one bell tower with close columns, but it should have two. Each bell tower had wide openings for ringing the bells.

=== In literature ===
The story of the attempt on the icon in 1898 was used by Leonid Andreev to create the plot of the play Savva (1906). In the play, the revolutionary Savva is Ufimtsev. In the play, the nihilist Savva convinces a drunken monk from a wealthy monastery known for its miracle-working icon of the Savior to plant an explosive device under the icon. He wants to make money by undermining the faith of parishioners in the miraculousness of the image. This would happen right before a large church festival, which would gather a large number of believers. The monk agrees, but at the last minute, he is scared and tells everything to the hegumen, the head of the monastery. The hegumen, having talked with the other monks, decides to use this to "glorify God" and increase the monastery's income. He instructs the monk to place the bomb in the shadow of the icon and takes out the miraculous image himself. After the explosion, the hegumen secretly returns the icon to its original place and demonstrates the "miracle". The censorship banned the play in 1906.

=== In cinematograph ===
Many scenes from the 2012 movie Don't Steal take place in the Cathedral of Our Lady of the "Omen". The movie was directed by Alexei Feoktistov and is based on a true story. In 2006, someone stole an exact copy of the original Icon Theotokos of Kursk, also known as the Omen. The movie was released by the United Editorial Office of the Ministry of Internal Affairs of Russia together with the film company Zet Cinematic Limited with the assistance of the Ministry of Internal Affairs of Russia in the Kursk region. Maria Berseneva and Oleg Kharitonov starred in the main roles. The movie tells the story of a group of professionals led by the main character, Michael Nikolaev (played by Oleg Kharitonov). They are on the trail of icon thieves and face opposition from "werewolves" in shoulder straps. The character Michael Nikolaev was based on a real-life investigator named Mikhail Kolaev. In 2006, Kolaev worked as the deputy chief of criminal investigations in the Criminal Investigation Department of the Kursk region. The movie is not a documentary; it contains fiction.

=== In philatery ===
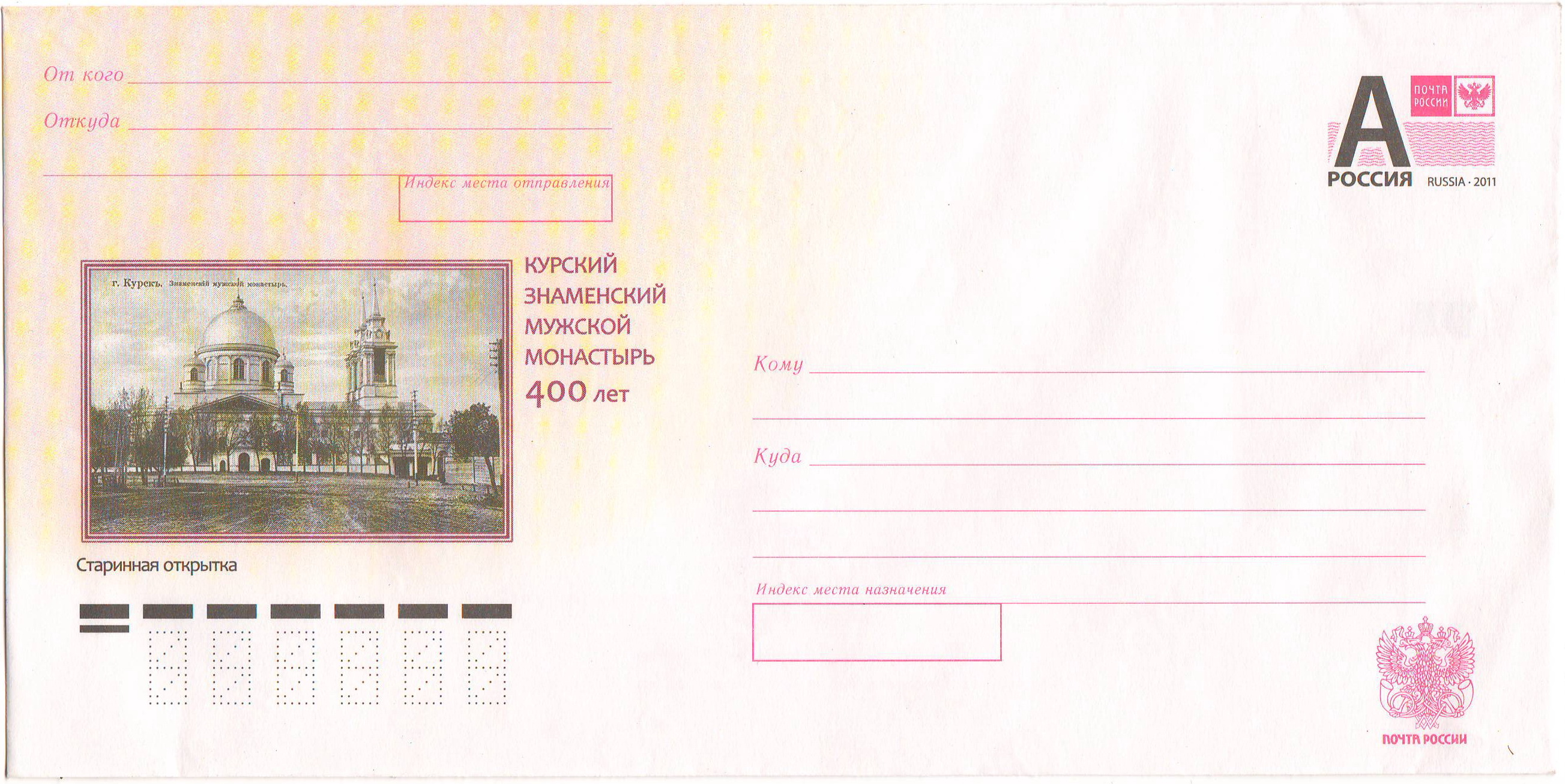
An illustrated stamped envelope from the Russian Post. It is dedicated to the 400th anniversary of Kursk Znamensky Monastery. 1 July 2013. Design by Kh. Betredinova.

Images of the Cathedral of Our Lady of the "Omen" are present on the art stamped envelopes of the USSR Post and Russian Post. On April 16, 1986, the USSR Post issued an envelope with an image of the Oktyabr cinema (artist — N. Muzykantova). On July 1, 2013, the Russian Post issued an art stamped envelope with the image of an old postcard — a pre-revolutionary photo of the Cathedral of Our Lady of the "Omen" (envelope design by H. Betredinova), dedicated to the 400th anniversary of the Cathedral of Our Lady of the "Omen" in an edition of 500 thousand pieces. The commemorative stamping of the postal envelope took place in The Cathedral of Our Lady of the "Omen" on September 29, 2013. The event was attended by Metropolitan Herman of Kursk and Rylsk, Archbishop Mark of Berlin-Germany and Great Britain, and Bishop Veniamin of Zheleznogorsk and Lgovsk.

== Bibliography ==
- Artsybasheva, T. N. (1998). Курский Знаменский мужской монастырь // Курский край и монастырская культура [Kursk Znamensky Monastery // Kursk Region and Monastic Culture] (in Russian). Курск: Издательство Курского государственного педагогического университета. p. 72. ISBN 5-88313-129-8.
- Artsybasheva T. N., Piskaryov S. P. (1997). Монастыри // Курск: Краеведческий словарь-справочник [Monasteries // Kursk: Local Lore Dictionary and Reference Book] (in Russian). Курск: ЮМЭКС. pp. 239–242. ISBN 5-89365-005-0.
- Afanasyev N. N., Volobuyeva E. A., hierodeacon Aleksandr Zimin (2013). Курский Знаменский мужской монастырь. К 400-летию основания [Kursk Znamensky Monastery. On the 400th anniversary of its foundation] (in Russian). Курск: Издательство Курской епархии. p. 44.
- Zlatoverkhovnikov, N. I. (1902). Знаменский монастырь // Памятники старины и нового времени и другие достопримечательности Курской губернии [Znamensky Monastery // Monuments of old and new times and other places of interest in Kursk Province] (in Russian). Курск: Типография губернского правления.
- Знаменский-Богородицкий-Рождественский монастырь // Энциклопедический словарь Брокгауза и Ефрона: в 86 т. [Znamensky-Bogoroditsky-Rozhdestvensky Monastery] (in Russian). СПб., 1890—1907.
- Знаменский собор // Курские святыни: утерянные и сохранённые [Cathedral of Our Lady of "The Omen" // Kursk shrines: lost and preserved] (in Russian). Курск: ООО «Регион-Пресс». 2011. pp. 1–2.
- Istomin, I. (1857). Историческое описание Курского Знаменского первоклассного монастыря [Historical Description of the Kursk Znamensky High-class Monastery] (in Russian). Курск: Типография губернского правления. p. 96.
- История о городе Курске, сочинённая в 1786 году из разных рукописей, грамот царских и патриарших, такожде и из рукописей летописца, в Курском Знаменском монастыре находящихся [History of the city of Kursk, compiled in 1786 from various manuscripts, letters of the tsar and patriarch, as well as from the manuscripts of the chronicler, in the Cathedral of Our Lady of the "Omen", located in the Kursk Znamensky Monastery.] (in Russian). Курск: Типография курского Приказа общественного призрения. 1792.
- Larionov, S. I. (1786). Описание Курского наместничества [Kursk Viceroyalty Description] (in Russian). М.: Вольная типография Пономарёва. p. 190.
- Levchenko V. V., Griva Т. А. (1993). Знаменский кафедральный собор // Встреча с Курском. Путеводитель-справочник [Cathedral of Our Lady of the "Omen" // Meeting with Kursk. Guidebook] (in Russian). Курск: «Курск». p. 50.
- Levchenko V. V., Griva T. A. (1996). Знаменский мужской монастырь // Музеи и памятники Курской области. Путеводитель-справочник [Male monastery of the "Omen" // Museums and monuments of Kursk region. Guide-guidebook] (in Russian). Курск: «Сеймъ». pp. 136–137.
- Monastiryov, I. E. (2012). История Курска в старой открытке: Путеводитель-справочник по площадям, улицам и окрестностям города в старых открытках конца XIX — начале XX веков [History of Kursk on old postcards: A guide to squares, streets and districts of the city on old postcards of the late XIX - early XX century] (in Russian). Курск: «Курск». p. 129.
- Monastiryov I. E., Donchenko Yu. V. (2001). Знаменский монастырь // Курск на старой открытке [Cathedral of Our Lady of the "Omen" // Kursk on an old postcard] (in Russian). Курск: Курский областной комитет государственной статистики. pp. 12–23. ISBN 5-901958-01-2.
- Novikov, N. M. (2009). Знаменский кафедральный собор города [The city's Cathedral of Our Lady of the "Omen"] (in Russian). Курск: Издательство Курской епархии. p. 56.
- Platonov, O. A. (2010). Курский Знаменский Богородицкий мужской монастырь // Русские монастыри и храмы. Историческая энциклопедия [Kursk Male Monastery of Our Lady of the "Omen" // Russian monasteries and temples. Historical Encyclopedia] (in Russian). М.: Институт русской цивилизации. pp. 276–278. ISBN 978-5-902725-61-9.
- Platonov, O. A. (2009). Курский Знаменский Богородицкий мужской монастырь // Святая Русь. Большая Энциклопедия Русского Народа. Русское Православие [Kurs Male Monastery of Our Lady of the "Omen" // Holy Russia. Big Encyclopedia of the Russian People. Russian Orthodoxy] (in Russian). Vol. 2. М.: Институт русской цивилизации. pp. 152–153.
- Samsonov V. I., Yazhur M. I. Кинотеатр "Октябрь" // Курск. Путеводитель по историческим и памятным местам [October Cinema // Kursk. Guide to historical and memorable places] (in Russian). Курск: Курское книжное издательство. pp. 35–36.
- Sklyaruk V. I., Logachev N. F., Ozyorov Yu. V. (2005). Знаменский собор // Старые курские открытки. Каталог иллюстрированных почтовых карточек 1899—1930 годов с объяснением видов города [Cathedral of Our Lady of the "Omen" // Old Kursk postcards. Catalog of illustrated post cards of 1899-1930 with explanation of the city views] (in Russian). Курск: Пресс-Факт. p. 304. ISBN 5-86354-106-7.
- Stepanov, V. B. (1998). Cathedral of Our Lady of the "Omen" // From the History of Monasteries and Temples of the Kursk Region [Cathedral of Our Lady of the "Omen" // From the History of Monasteries and Temples of the Kursk Region] (in Russian). Курск: Курский государственный медицинский университет. pp. 158–163. ISBN 5-7487-0100-6.
- Stepanov, V. B. (2006). Переход на южную часть Красной площади // Пешком по городу. Путеводители по историческому центру г. Курска [Passage to the southern part of the Red Square // Walking around the city. Guides to the historical center of Kursk] (in Russian). Курск: ИПП Курск. pp. 127–147. ISBN 5-91267-001-5.
- Tankov А. А., Zlatoverkhovnikov N. I. (1902). Знаменский монастырь // Путеводитель по Курску [Cathedral of Our Lady of the "Omen" // Kursk Travel Guide] (in Russian). Курск. pp. 10–12.
- Teplitsky, M. L. (2001). Знаменский кафедральный собор // Автографы в камне. Архитектурная летопись Курска [Cathedral of Our Lady of the "Omen" // Autographs in stone. Architectural chronicle of Kursk] (in Russian). Курск: Курская городская типография. p. 32.
- Fyodorov, S. I. (1982). Архитектурно-исторический центр Курска (из истории кинотеатра "Октябрь") // Архитектурные очерки Курского края [Architectural and Historical Center of Kursk (from the history of the cinema October) // Architectural Sketches of Kursk Region] (in Russian). Воронеж: Центрально-Ченозёмное издательство. pp. 41–50.
- Fyodorov, S. I. (1995). Историческая летопись храма // Записки из фронтовой сумки: воспоминания архитектора [Historical chronicle of the temple // Notes from the front bag: memoirs of the architect] (in Russian). Орёл: Издательство Орловской государственной телерадиокомпании. pp. 120–137. ISBN 5-86615-012-3.
- Shpilyov, А. G. (2000). Знаменский монастырь [Cathedral of Our Lady of the "Omen"] (in Russian). Курск: Курский государственный областной музей археологии. p. 24.
- Shpilyov, А. G. (2011). Курский Знаменский мужской монастырь в 1918—1932 гг. (к вопросу о взаимодействии Русской православной церкви и государственных органов в первые десятилетия Советской власти) // Русский сборник [Kursk Male Monastery of Our Lady of the "Omen" in 1918-1932 (to the question of the interaction between the Russian Orthodox Church and state bodies in the first decades of Soviet power) // Russian Collection] (in Russian). Брянск: ООО Издательство "Курсив". pp. 86–92.
