= Diocese of Kursk =

Diocese of Kursk Курская епархия
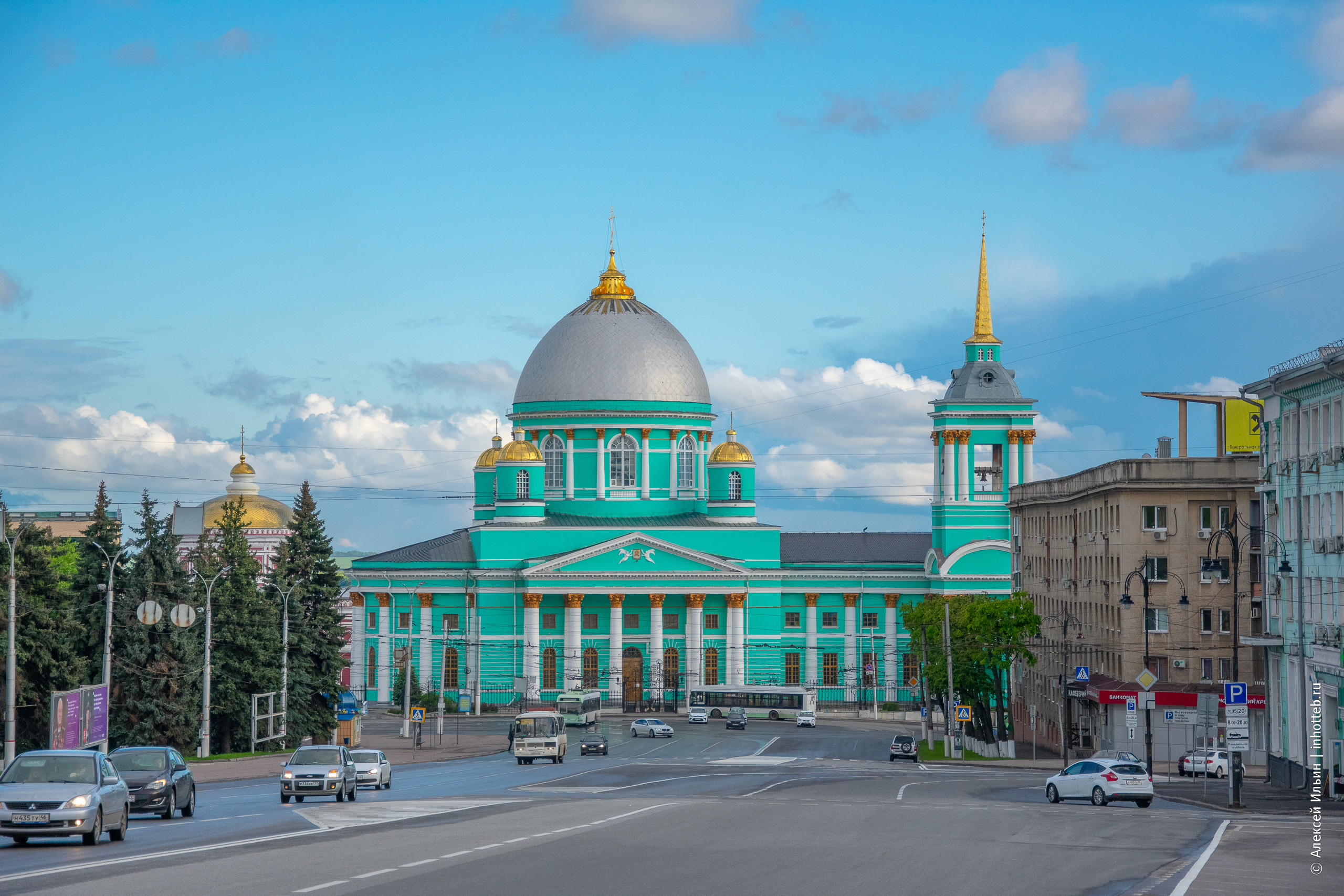
- Cathedral of Our Lady of the "Omen"

Location
- Territory: Kursk Oblast
- Deaneries: 13
- Headquarters: Kursk

Information
- Denomination: Eastern Orthodox
- Sui iuris church: Russian Orthodox Church
- Established: 17 October 1799
- Cathedral: Znamensky Cathedral
- Language: Old Church Slavonic

Current leadership
- Governance: Eparchy
- Bishop: Herman (Moralin) since 17 August 2004

Website
- курская-епархия.рф

The Diocese of Kursk (Russian: Курская епархия) is a diocese (eparchy) of the Russian Orthodox Church, uniting parishes and monasteries in the middle part of the Kursk region (within the borders of Belovsky, Glushkovsky, Zolotukhinsky, Korenevsky, Kursk, Kurchatovsky, Medvensky, Oboyansky, Oktyabrsky, Ponyrovsky, Rylsky and Sudzhansky districts). It is part of the Kursk Metropolitanate.

== History ==
It is possible that the Kursk bishopric could have existed before the Tatar-Mongol invasion, although this is not reflected in the historical documents that have reached us.

In 1667 (according to other sources, in 1666) the Belgorod and Oboyan diocese was created. In the 1682 Moscow Sobor, the issue of opening the Kursk diocese was decided, but such an establishment did not take place then.

In 1787, the Belgorod-Oboyan diocese was renamed the Belgorod-Kursk diocese.

On October 17, 1799, Kursk became the center of the diocese, and the archpastors began to be called Kursk and Belgorod.

In 1833, the department was moved to Kursk, after which the Belgorod department became a vicarage.

Since February 25, 1905, the diocese was called Kursk and Oboyansk.

In 1967, the Kursk diocese received its current name Kursk and Rylsk. In the 1960s and early 1980s, the number of churches in the diocese decreased. If in 1966 there were 105 Orthodox churches in the Kursk region, then in 1982 there were only 85 left. However, despite official atheistic propaganda during the Soviet period, a significant proportion of Kursk residents remained Orthodox. For example, in 1965, 49.2% of those born were baptized, and in 1967 already 62.7%.

On July 26, 2012, the Zheleznogorsk and Shchigrovsk dioceses were separated from the Kursk diocese with the inclusion of all three dioceses in the newly formed Kursk Metropolis

== Deaneries ==
The diocese is divided into 13 ecclesiastical districts (as of October 2022):

- 1st deanery of the city of Kursk
- 2nd deanery of the city of Kursk
- Belovskoye Deanery
- Greater Soldiers' Deanery
- Zolotukhinsky deanery
- Korenevskoe deanery
- Kursk deanery
- Kurchatov Deanery
- Medvensky deanery
- Oboyan Deanery
- Ponyrovsky deanery
- Rila Deanery
- Sudzhan Deanery

== Bishops ==
- Feoktist (Mochulsky) (February 9, 1787 – September 15, 1801; until October 16, 1799 – Belgorod and Kursk)
- Evgeny (Kazantsev) (July 14, 1818 – February 27, 1822)
- Vladimir (Uzhinsky) (April 12, 1822 – March 28, 1831)
- Innokenty (Selnokrinov) (March 28, 1831 – February 10, 1832)
- Iliodor (Chistyakov) (March 13, 1832 – November 5, 1860)
- Sergius (Lyapidevsky) (January 1, 1861 – January 11, 1880)
- Efrem (Ryazanov) (January 11, 1880 – March 19, 1883)
- Mikhail (Luzin) (March 19, 1883 – March 20, 1887)
- Justin (Okhotin) (March 28, 1887 – September 3, 1893)
- Yuvenally (Polovtsev) (September 3, 1893 – March 7, 1898)
- Lavrenty (Nekrasov) (March 22, 1898 – June 17, 1904)
- Pitirim (Oknov) (June 17, 1904 – October 4, 1911)
- Stefan (Arkhangelsky) (October 4, 1911 – June 18, 1914)
- Tikhon (Vasilevsky) (July 11, 1914 – May 15, 1917)
- Feofan (Gavrilov) (1917–1920) emigrated
- Nazariy (Kirillov) (1920–1923)
- Yuvenally (Maslovsky) (October 17, 1923 – January 1925)
- Nazariy (Kirillov) (April 25, 1925 – February 1928)
- Alexy (Gotovtsev) (February – April 25, 1928) v/u, Bishop of Rylsky
- Damian (Voskresensky) (April 25, 1928 – November 22, 1932)
- Pamfil (Lyaskovsky) (November 23, 1932 – August 11, 1933) v/u
- Onufriy (Gagalyuk) (August 11, 1933 – 1935) (manager until November 22, 1933)
- Chrysogon (Ivanovsky) (August – September 1935) refused appointment
- Alexander (Schukin) (September 30 – December 1935) did not go to Kursk
- Artemon (Evstratov) (December 15, 1935 – May 1937)
- Theodosius (Kirika) (May 23 – August 13, 1937)
- Efrem (Efremov) (September 1, 1937 – November 14, 1941)
- Pitirim (Sviridov) (July 14, 1943 – January 13, 1947)
- Alexy (Sergeev) (January 13, 1947 – June 3, 1948)
- Nestor (Sidoruk) (June 3, 1948 – October 1, 1951)
- Innokenty (Zelnitsky) (December 27, 1951 – December 8, 1958)
- Roman (Tang) (December 9, 1958 – May 21, 1959)
- Leonid (Polyakov) (June 11, 1959 – April 9, 1962)
- Seraphim (Nikitin) (July 8, 1962 – June 25, 1971)
- Nikolai (Bychkovsky) (July 28, 1971 – September 3, 1974)
- Chrysostom (Martishkin) (September 3, 1974 – December 26, 1984)
- Yuvenally (Tarasov) (December 26, 1984 – August 17, 2004)
- Herman (Moralin)
