= Illustrated stamped envelope =

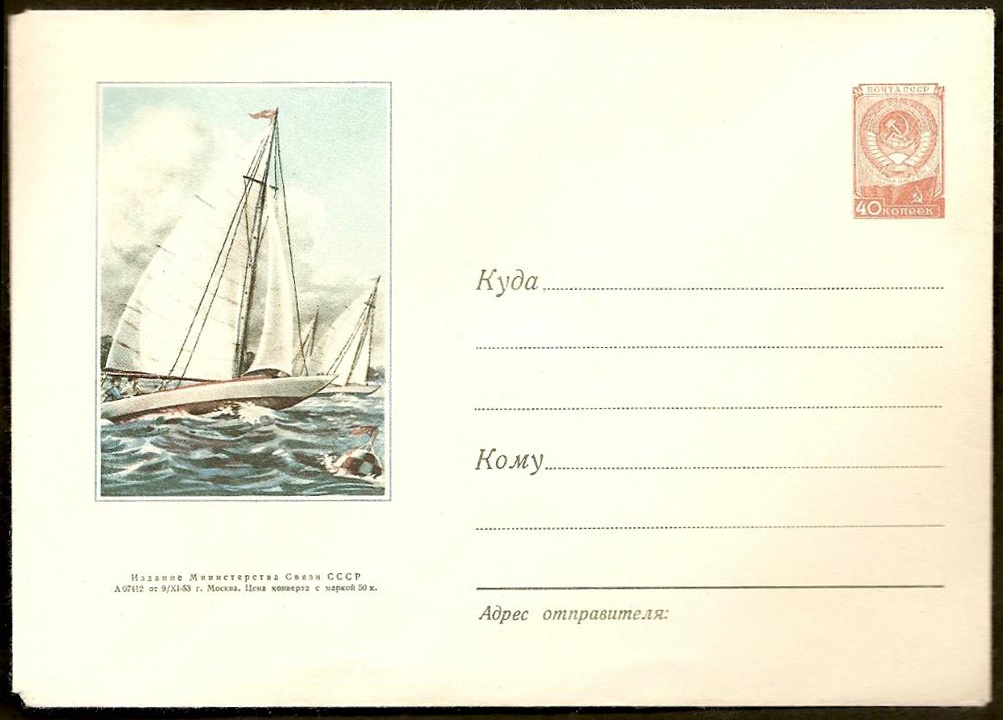
The first Soviet illustrated stamped envelope (1953)

An illustrated stamped envelope (Russian: Художественный маркированный конверт) is a stamped envelope with an additional work of art on the face side of the envelope.
